= Laberge =

Laberge or LaBerge may refer to:

== People ==
- Charles Laberge (1827–1874), Quebec lawyer, journalist and political figure
- David LaBerge (born 1929), neuropsychologist specializing in the attention process and the role of apical dendrites in cognition and consciousness
- Édouard Laberge (1829–1883), physician and political figure in Quebec
- Émile Baillargeon-Laberge (born 1990), Canadian professional wrestler
- Louis Laberge, OQ (1924–2002), French Canadian labour union leader
- Martine LaBerge, Canadian-American bioengineer
- Mia LaBerge (born 1967), American artist who painted the first Steinway Art Case Piano created to honor a university
- Robert de La Berge (1638–1712), born in France, went to Quebec in 1658; most LaBerges & LaBarges in the Americas are his descendants
- Samuel Laberge (born 1997), French Canadian professional ice hockey player
- Stephen LaBerge (born 1947), psychophysiologist and a leader in the scientific study of lucid dreaming
- Walter B. LaBerge (1924–2004), aerospace engineer and defense industry executive, US Under Secretary of the Army 1977–1980

== Places ==
- Lake Laberge, widening of the Yukon River north of Whitehorse, Yukon in Canada
- Lake Laberge (electoral district), Yukon Territory in Canada
- Laberge River, a tributary of Hebert Lake, in Québec, Canada

== See also ==
- Laberg (disambiguation)
