= 2015–16 QMJHL season =

- League: Quebec Major Junior Hockey League
- Sport: Hockey
- Duration: Regular season September 10, 2015 – March 19, 2016; Playoffs; March 25, 2016 – May 12, 2016
- Teams: 18
- TV partner(s): Eastlink TV; TVA Sports; MATV

Draft
- Top draft pick: Joe Veleno
- Picked by: Saint John Sea Dogs

Regular season
- Jean Rougeau Trophy: Rouyn-Noranda Huskies (2)
- Season MVP: Francis Perron (Rouyn-Noranda Huskies)
- Top scorer: Conor Garland (Moncton Wildcats)

Playoffs
- Playoffs MVP: Francis Perron (Huskies)
- Finals champions: Rouyn-Noranda Huskies
- Runners-up: Shawinigan Cataractes

QMJHL seasons
- 2014–15 2016–17

2015–16 CHL season
- League: Canadian Hockey League
- Sport: Ice hockey
- Duration: OHL; September 2015 – March 2016; QMJHL; September 2015 – March 2016; WHL; September 2015 – March 2016
- Teams: 60
- TV partner(s): RDS, Rogers Sportsnet, Rogers TV, Shaw TV
- Season MVP: Mitch Marner (London Knights) (OHL)
- Top scorer: Conor Garland (Moncton Wildcats) (QMJHL)

Memorial Cup
- Finals champions: London Knights (OHL) (2nd title)
- Runners-up: Rouyn-Noranda Huskies (QMJHL)

The 2015–16 QMJHL season is the 47th season of the Quebec Major Junior Hockey League (QMJHL). The regular season began on September 10, 2015, and ended on March 19, 2016.

The playoffs began shortly after the end of the regular season, and ended on May 12, 2016; the winning team, the Rouyn-Noranda Huskies, was awarded the President's Cup and a berth in the 2016 Memorial Cup held at ENMAX Centrium in Red Deer, Alberta. The Red Deer Rebels of the Western Hockey League (WHL) qualified for the tournament as the host team.

== Regular season standings ==
Note: GP = Games played; W = Wins; L = Losses; OTL = Overtime losses; SL = Shootout losses; GF = Goals for; GA = Goals against; PTS = Points; x = clinched playoff berth; y = clinched division title

Maritimes Division	GP	W	L	OTL	SL	PTS	GF	GA	Rank
y-Saint John Sea Dogs	68	42	20	6	0	90	258	222	3
x-Moncton Wildcats	68	36	21	9	2	83	268	250	6
x-Cape Breton Screaming Eagles	68	38	24	5	1	82	286	237	7
x-Charlottetown Islanders	68	35	26	5	2	77	227	232	9
x-Acadie–Bathurst Titan	68	27	35	3	3	60	224	254	14
Halifax Mooseheads	68	21	39	7	1	50	193	277	17

East Division	GP	W	L	OTL	SL	PTS	GF	GA	Rank
y-Shawinigan Cataractes	68	44	19	4	1	93	281	220	2
x-Rimouski Océanic	68	36	25	5	2	79	208	203	8
x-Chicoutimi Saguenéens	68	32	25	5	6	75	223	217	10
x-Victoriaville Tigres	68	33	28	3	4	73	246	249	11
x-Quebec Remparts	68	28	33	6	1	63	205	258	12
Baie-Comeau Drakkar	68	14	49	2	3	33	147	302	18

West Division	GP	W	L	OTL	SL	PTS	GF	GA	Rank
y-Rouyn-Noranda Huskies	68	54	9	3	2	113	302	181	1
x-Val-d'Or Foreurs	68	49	15	3	1	102	293	197	4
x-Gatineau Olympiques	68	46	19	2	1	95	250	173	5
x-Blainville-Boisbriand Armada	68	26	32	8	2	60	171	201	13
x-Sherbrooke Phoenix	68	24	35	7	2	57	207	241	15
x-Drummondville Voltigeurs	68	27	39	2	0	56	189	264	16

== Scoring leaders ==
Note: GP = Games played; G = Goals; A = Assists; Pts = Points; PIM = Penalty minutes

Player	Team	GP	G	A	Pts	PIM
Conor Garland	Moncton Wildcats	62	39	89	128	97
Francis Perron	Rouyn-Noranda Huskies	62	41	66	107	38
Pierre-Luc Dubois	Cape Breton Screaming Eagles	62	42	57	99	112
Alexis D'Aoust	Shawinigan Cataractes	68	44	54	98	22
Vitalii Abramov	Gatineau Olympiques	63	38	55	93	36
Anthony Beauregard	Val-d'Or Foreurs	67	30	63	93	62
Nicolas Roy	Chicoutimi Saguenéens	63	48	42	90	71
Michael Carcone	Drummondville Voltigeurs	66	47	42	89	80
Alex Barré-Boulet	Drummondville Voltigeurs	65	35	54	89	42
Michael Joly	Rimouski/Cape Breton	60	47	41	88	38

== Leading goaltenders ==
Note: GP = Games played; Mins = Minutes played; W = Wins; L = Losses: OTL = Overtime losses; SL = Shootout losses; GA = Goals Allowed; SO = Shutouts; GAA = Goals against average

Player	Team	GP	Mins	W	L	OTL	SOL	GA	SO	Sv%	GAA
Chase Marchand	Rouyn-Noranda Huskies	38	2154	29	6	0	1	87	2	.911	2.42
Mathieu Bellemare	Gatineau Olympiques	43	2497	28	12	1	1	101	4	.901	2.43
Mark Grametbauer	Blainville-Boisbriand/Gatineau	33	1863	18	12	2	0	77	2	.897	2.48
Julio Billia	Chicoutimi Saguenéens	49	2707	22	20	2	3	118	1	.919	2.62
Sam Montembeault	Blainville-Boisbriand Armada	47	2710	17	19	6	2	119	3	.901	2.63

== 2016 President's Cup playoffs ==
Round 1
1	Rouyn-Noranda	4
16	Drummondville	0
4	Val-d'Or	2
13	Blainville-Boisbriand	4
5	Gatineau	4
12	Quebec	0
6	Moncton	4
11	Victoriaville	1
2	Shawinigan	4
15	Sherbrooke	1
8	Rimouski	2
9	Charlottetown	4
3	Saint John
14	Acadie–Bathurst	1
7	Cape Breton	4
10	Chicoutimi	2

Quarter-finals
1	Rouyn-Noranda	4
13	Blainville-Boisbriand	1
5	Gatineau	2
6	Moncton	4
2	Shawinigan	4
9	Charlottetown	2
3	Saint John	4
7	Cape Breton	3

Semi-finals
1	Rouyn-Noranda	4
6	Moncton	2
2	Shawinigan	4
3	Saint John	1

President's Cup Championship
1	Rouyn-Noranda	4
2	Shawinigan	1

== First round ==
=== (1) Rouyn-Noranda Huskies vs. (16) Drummondville Voltigeurs ===
March 25	Rouyn-Noranda Huskies	10 – 0	Drummondville Voltigeurs	Aréna Iamgold	Recap
4:35 - pp - Timo Meier (1); 6:02 - A.J. Greer (1); 8:54 - pp - Timo Meier (2); 13:13 - pp - J.C. Beaudin (1)		First period	No scoring
3:15 - sh - Timo Meier (3); 9:08 - pp - Francis Perron (1); 10:38 - A.J. Greer (2); 14:16 - pp - Allan Caron (1); 19:11 - Gabriel Fontaine (1)		Second period	No scoring
12:14 - Philippe Myers (1)		Third period	No scoring
Chase Marchand (22 saves / 22 shots)		Goalie stats	Frédéric Foulem (10 saves / 14 shots); Tristan Bérubé (10 saves / 16 shots)

March 26	Rouyn-Noranda Huskies	6 – 0	Drummondville Voltigeurs	Aréna Iamgold	Recap
14:13 - pp - Julien Nantel (1)		First period	No scoring
4:06 - Timo Meier (4); 9:50 - A.J. Greer (3); 13:15 - pp - A.J. Greer (4); 16:11 - pp - Francis Perron (2); 17:36 - pp Anthony Wojcik (1)		Second period	No scoring
No scoring		Third period	No scoring
Chase Marchand (18 saves / 18 shots)		Goalie stats	Tristan Bérubé (21 saves / 27 shots)

March 29	Drummondville Voltigeurs	1 – 10	Rouyn-Noranda Huskies	Centre Marcel Dionne	Recap
3:24 - Gabriel Slight (1)		First period	Alexandre Fortin (1) - pp - 8:40; J.C. Beaudin (2) - 11:55
No scoring		Second period	Francis Perron (3) - 9:00; Nikolas Brouillard (1) - pp - 15:13; J.C. Beaudin (3) - sh - 15:35; Antoine Waked (1) - sh - 16:49; Jérémy Lauzon (1) - pp - 19:15
No scoring		Third period	Antoine Waked (2) - sh - 11:26; A.J. Greer (5) - 13:38; Zachary Lauzon (1) - 19:25
Tristan Bérubé (34 saves / 44 shots)		Goalie stats	Chase Marchand (22 saves / 23 shots); Samuel Harvey (7 saves / 7 shots)

March 30	Drummondville Voltigeurs	3 – 7	Rouyn-Noranda Huskies	Centre Marcel Dionne	Recap
No scoring		First period	Mārtiņš Dzierkals (1) - 0:17
7:41 - Frédéric Aubé (1)		Second period	Timo Meier (5) - pp - 6:21; Timo Meier (6) - 8:15; Timo Meier (7) - pp - 11:17; Nikolas Brouillard (2) - pp - 16:13; Timo Meier (8) - 19:39
17:00 - pp - Nicolas Beaudin (1); 19:44 - pp - Alex Barré-Boulet (1)		Third period	Gabriel Fontaine (2) - 12:53
Tristan Bérubé (24 saves / 30 shots); Céderic Godbout-Parent (1 save / 2 shots)		Goalie stats	Samuel Harvey (32 saves / 35 shots)

Rouyn-Noranda wins series 4–0

=== (2) Shawinigan Cataractes vs. (15) Sherbrooke Phoenix ===
March 25	Shawinigan Cataractes	2 – 3	Sherbrooke Phoenix	Centre Bionest de Shawinigan	Recap
No scoring		First period	Daniel Audette (1) - pp - 2:24; Carl Neill (1) - pp - 9:48
3:24 - Brandon Gignac (1); 14:49 - Alexis D'Aoust (1)		Second period	Guillaume Gauthier (1) - pp - 17:12
No scoring		Third period	No scoring
Philippe Cadorette (28 saves / 31 shots)		Goalie stats	Evan Fitzpatrick (30 saves / 32 shots)

March 26	Shawinigan Cataractes	3 – 2	Sherbrooke Phoenix	Centre Bionest de Shawinigan	Recap
No scoring		First period	Guillaume Gauthier (2) - 3:12
11:23 - Dennis Yan (1); 16:37 - Dmytro Timashov (1); 17:40 - Alexis D'Aoust (2)		Second period	Guillaume Gauthier (3) - pp - 4:10
No scoring		Third period	No scoring
Philippe Cadorette (30 saves / 32 shots)		Goalie stats	Evan Fitzpatrick (39 saves / 42 shots)

March 29	Sherbrooke Phoenix	3 – 8	Shawinigan Cataractes	Palais des Sports	Recap
13:15 - pp - Carl Neill (2); 14:41 - pp - Nicolas Poulin (1)		First period	No scoring
3:58 - Guillaume Gauthier (4)		Second period	Dennis Yan (2) - 6:26; Gabriel Gagné (1) - 6:38; Cavan Fitzgerald (1) - 8:55; Anthony Beauvillier (1) - pp - 11:24; Alex Pawelczyk (1) - sh - 15:14; Anthony Beauvillier (2) - pp - 17:21
No scoring		Third period	Danny Moynihan (1) - 1:11; Cavan Fitzgerald (2) - 7:48
Evan Fitzpatrick (26 saves / 33 shots); Charles-Antoine Poirier-Turcot (15 saves / 16 shots)		Goalie stats	Philippe Cadorette (22 saves / 25 shots)

March 30	Sherbrooke Phoenix	2 – 3	2OT	Shawinigan Cataractes	Palais des Sports	Recap
No scoring		First period		Alexis D'Aoust (3) - 10:16
5:56 - pp - Carl Neill (3)		Second period		No scoring
4:45 - pp - Nicolas Poulin (2)		Third period		Alexis D'Aoust (4) - 9:10
No scoring		Second overtime period		Sam Girard (1) - 17:21
Evan Fitzpatrick (73 saves / 76 shots)		Goalie stats		Philippe Cadorette (34 saves / 36 shots)

April 1	Shawinigan Cataractes	4 – 1	Sherbrooke Phoenix	Centre Bionest de Shawinigan	Recap
0:19 - Danny Moynihan (2); 11:33 - pp - Brandon Gignac (2)		First period	No scoring
7:08 - Alexis D'Aoust (5)		Second period	Carl Neill (4) - pp - 3:32
19:49 - pp - en - Dmytro Timashov (2)		Third period	No scoring
Philippe Cadorette (24 saves / 25 shots)		Goalie stats	Evan Fitzpatrick (39 saves / 42 shots)

Shawinigan wins series 4–1

=== (3) Saint John Sea Dogs vs. (14) Acadie–Bathurst Titan ===
March 25	Saint John Sea Dogs	4 – 1	Acadie–Bathurst Titan	Harbour Station	Recap
14:58 - Sam Povorozniouk (1); 15:42 - Mathieu Joseph (1)		First period	No scoring
15:04 - pp - Sam Povorozniouk (2)		Second period	No scoring
19:11 - en - Sam Povorozniouk (3)		Third period	Daniil Miromanov (1) - 3:35
Marc-Antoine Turcotte (25 saves / 26 shots)		Goalie stats	Reilly Pickard (37 saves / 40 shots)

March 26	Saint John Sea Dogs	4 – 2	Acadie–Bathurst Titan	Harbour Station	Recap
12:54 - Thomas Chabot (1)		First period	Christophe Boivin (1) - pp - 19:46
0:33 - Sam Povorozniouk (4)		Second period	Jeffrey Viel (1) - 0:50
17:12 - Matthew Highmore (1); 19:16 - Mathieu Joseph (2)		Third period	No scoring
Marc-Antoine Turcotte (25 saves / 27 shots)		Goalie stats	Reilly Pickard (34 saves / 38 shots); Tanner Somers (0 saves / 0 shots)

March 29	Acadie–Bathurst Titan	1 – 7	Saint John Sea Dogs	K. C. Irving Regional Centre	Recap
18:13 - pp - Christophe Boivin (2)		First period	Mathieu Joseph (3) - 0:41; Mathieu Joseph (4) - sh - 14:57
No scoring		Second period	Daniel Del Paggio (1) - 6:08; Samuel Dove-McFalls (1) - 11:49; Mathieu Joseph (5) - pp - 19:38
No scoring		Third period	Sam Povorozniouk (5) - 9:24; Joe Veleno (1) - 13:20
Reilly Pickard (27 saves / 34 shots)		Goalie stats	Marc-Antoine Turcotte (31 saves / 32 shots)

March 30	Acadie–Bathurst Titan	6 – 3	Saint John Sea Dogs	K. C. Irving Regional Centre	Recap
0:21 - Daniil Miromanov (2); 12:42 - Daniil Miromanov (3)		First period	No scoring
0:21 - Christophe Boivin (3); 2:50 - Jordan Maher (1)		Second period	Matt Murphy (1) - 5:51; Nathan Noel (1) - pp - 14:06
8:44 - Daniil Miromanov (4); 18:13 - en - Daniil Miromanov (5)		Third period	Samuel Dove-McFalls (2) - pp - 17:40
Reilly Pickard (40 saves / 43 shots)		Goalie stats	Marc-Antoine Turcotte (8 saves / 12 shots); Alex Bishop (14 saves / 15 shots)

April 1	Saint John Sea Dogs	4 – 3	OT	Acadie–Bathurst Titan	Harbour Station	Recap
15:10 - pp - Sam Povorozniouk (6)		First period		Jeffrey Viel (2) - pp - 12:02
6:44 - Luke Green (1); 18:54 - Matt Murphy (2)		Second period		Daniil Miromanov (6) - 7:13; Mark Simpson (1) - sh - 12:56
No scoring		Third period		No scoring
2:39 - Thomas Chabot (2)		First overtime period		No scoring
Marc-Antoine Turcotte (21 saves / 24 shots)		Goalie stats		Reilly Pickard (42 saves / 46 shots)

Saint John wins series 4–1

=== (4) Val-d'Or Foreurs vs. (13) Blainville-Boisbriand Armada ===
March 25	Val-d'Or Foreurs	3 – 2	Blainville-Boisbriand Armada	Centre Air Creebec	Recap
7:03 - Nicolas Aubé-Kubel (1); 19:38 - pp - Nicolas Aubé-Kubel (2)		First period	William Gignac (1) - pp - 15:28
18:21 - pp - Alexis Pépin (1)		Second period	No scoring
No scoring		Third period	Jan Dufek (1) - 8:51
Étienne Montpetit (20 saves / 22 shots)		Goalie stats	Sam Montembeault (25 saves / 28 shots)

March 26	Val-d'Or Foreurs	1 – 4	Blainville-Boisbriand Armada	Centre Air Creebec	Recap
No scoring		First period	Jan Dufek (2) - pp - 10:19
No scoring		Second period	Philippe Sanche (1) - 2:27; Guillaume Beaudoin (1) - 13:21
8:27 - Olivier Galipeau (1)		Third period	Philippe Sanche (2) - 11:11
Étienne Montpetit (20 saves / 24 shots)		Goalie stats	Sam Montembeault (32 saves / 33 shots)

March 29	Blainville-Boisbriand Armada	3 – 1	Val-d'Or Foreurs	Centre d'Excellence Sports Rousseau	Recap
No scoring		First period	No scoring
8:09 - Yvan Mongo (1)		Second period	No scoring
7:39 - Miguel Picard (1); 18:49 - en - Philippe Sanche (3)		Third period	Alexis Pépin (2) - 15:46
Sam Montembeault (32 saves / 33 shots)		Goalie stats	Étienne Montpetit (20 saves / 22 shots)

March 30	Blainville-Boisbriand Armada	3 – 2	Val-d'Or Foreurs	Centre d'Excellence Sports Rousseau	Recap
11:24 - Connor Bramwell (1); 19:57 - pp - Jan Dufek (3)		First period	No scoring
No scoring		Second period	Anthony Beauregard (1) - pp - 6:29
8:18 - Kristian Pospisil (1)		Third period	Shawn Ouellette-St-Amant (1) - 10:54
Sam Montembeault (29 saves / 31 shots)		Goalie stats	Étienne Montpetit (25 saves / 28 shots)

April 1	Val-d'Or Foreurs	6 – 5	Blainville-Boisbriand Armada	Centre Air Creebec	Recap
No scoring		First period	Alexander Katerinakis (1) - pp - 10:50; Joël Teasdale (1) - 12:26; William Gignac (2) - 15:19
0:34 - Anthony Richard (1); 1:45 - Julien Gauthier (1); 3:07 - Carl Tremblay (1)		Second period	Philippe Sanche (4) - 9:44
6:07 - pp - Anthony Richard (2); 10:56 - pp - Julien Gauthier (2); 17:53 - Nicolas Aubé-Kubel (3)		Third period	Tyler Hylland (1) - 4:03
Étienne Montpetit (13 saves / 18 shots)		Goalie stats	Sam Montembeault (34 saves / 40 shots)

April 3	Blainville-Boisbriand Armada	3 – 2	3OT	Val-d'Or Foreurs	Centre d'Excellence Sports Rousseau	Recap
No scoring		First period		No scoring
8:01 - pp - Joël Teasdale (2); 13:12 - Joël Teasdale (3)		Second period		Jan Mandate (1) - 5:48
No scoring		Third period		Jan Mandate (2) - 1:19
12:26 - Philippe Sanche (5)		Third overtime period		No scoring
Sam Montembeault (54 saves / 56 shots)		Goalie stats		Étienne Montpetit (48 saves / 51 shots)

Blainville-Boisbriand wins series 4–2

=== (5) Gatineau Olympiques vs. (12) Quebec Remparts ===
March 25	Gatineau Olympiques	1 – 0	Quebec Remparts	Centre Robert Guertin	Recap
No scoring		First period	No scoring
No scoring		Second period	No scoring
15:10 - Vitalii Abramov (1)		Third period	No scoring
Mathieu Bellemare (16 saves / 16 shots)		Goalie stats	Evgeny Kiselev (27 saves / 28 shots)

March 26	Gatineau Olympiques	2 – 1	Quebec Remparts	Centre Robert Guertin	Recap
No scoring		First period	No scoring
No scoring		Second period	Bronson Beaton (1) - 0:28
4:42 - Tristen Elie (1); 12:32 - Alexandre Alain (1)		Third period	No scoring
Mathieu Bellemare (10 saves / 11 shots)		Goalie stats	Evgeny Kiselev (49 saves / 51 shots)

March 29	Quebec Remparts	3 – 9	Gatineau Olympiques	Centre Vidéotron	Recap
7:09 - Louis-Filip Côté (1)		First period	Vitalii Abramov (2) - 1:22; Alex Dostie (1) - 4:10; Gabryel Paquin-Boudreau (1) - 4:59; Vitalii Abramov (3) - 13:45; Gabryel Paquin-Boudreau (2) - 18:11
3:27 - Olivier Garneau (1); 17:14 - Derek Gentile (1)		Second period	Austin Eastman (1) - 4:56; William McSween (1) - 8:19; Yan Pavel Laplante (1) - 14:02
No scoring		Third period	Gabryel Paquin-Boudreau (3) - pp - 5:34
Evgeny Kiselev (22 saves / 28 shots); Samuel Cardinal (4 saves / 7 shots)		Goalie stats	Mathieu Bellemare (13 saves / 16 shots)

March 30	Quebec Remparts	2 – 4	Gatineau Olympiques	Centre Vidéotron	Recap
No scoring		First period	Vitalii Abramov (4) - 3:19; Vitalii Abramov (5) - 13:30
18:23 - Olivier Garneau (2)		Second period	Gabryel Paquin-Boudreau (4) - 14:19
6:20 - Bronson Beaton (2)		Third period	Gabryel Paquin-Boudreau (5) - en - 19:52
Evgeny Kiselev (27 saves / 30 shots)		Goalie stats	Mark Grametbauer (27 saves / 29 shots)

Gatineau wins series 4–0

=== (6) Moncton Wildcats vs. (11) Victoriaville Tigres ===
March 25	Moncton Wildcats	5 – 4	2OT	Victoriaville Tigres	Moncton Coliseum	Recap
7:15 - Stephen Johnson (1)		First period		Alexandre Goulet (1) - 13:08
8:22 - William Bower (1)		Second period		Pascal Laberge (1) - 13:49
7:24 - Conor Garland (1); 8:10 - Conor Garland (2)		Third period		Carl Marois (1) - 1:41; Bradley Lalonde (1) - 1:51
17:58 - Will Smith (1)		Second overtime period		No scoring
Keven Bouchard (43 saves / 47 shots)		Goalie stats		Olivier Tremblay (62 saves / 67 shots)

March 26	Moncton Wildcats	6 – 5	OT	Victoriaville Tigres	Moncton Coliseum	Recap
5:18 - Kelly Klíma (1); 10:34 - sh - Zack MacEwen (1); 18:22 - pp - Václav Karabáček (1)		First period		Marc Beckstead (1) - pp - 3:20; Mario Huber (1) - 14:36; Pascal Laberge (2) - 15:37
13:50 - Manuel Wiederer (1)		Second period		No scoring
16:06 - Zack MacEwen (2)		Third period		Félix Lauzon (1) - pp - 11:20; Mathieu Ayotte (1) - pp - 15:40
18:23 - Václav Karabáček (2)		First overtime period		No scoring
Keven Bouchard (35 saves / 40 shots)		Goalie stats		Olivier Tremblay (43 saves / 49 shots)

March 29	Victoriaville Tigres	2 – 5	Moncton Wildcats	Colisée Desjardins	Recap
15:06 - Bradley Lalonde (2)		First period	Manuel Wiederer (2) - pp - 3:56
No scoring		Second period	Cameron Askew (1) - pp - 4:47; Cody Donaghey (1) - pp - 5:47; Stephen Johnson (2) - 11:12
2:19 - pp - Bradley Lalonde (3)		Third period	Stephen Johnson (3) - pp - 17:41
Olivier Tremblay (11 saves / 15 shots); James Povall (16 saves / 16 shots)		Goalie stats	Keven Bouchard (32 saves / 34 shots)

March 30	Victoriaville Tigres	4 – 2	Moncton Wildcats	Colisée Desjardins	Recap
15:50 - pp - Alexandre Goulet (2); 18:26 - Mathieu Ayotte (2)		First period	Conor Garland (3) - 18:03
9:29 - Alexandre Goulet (3)		Second period	No scoring
19:38 - en - Max Comtois (1)		Third period	Zack MacEwen (3) - 12:38
James Povall (24 saves / 26 shots)		Goalie stats	Keven Bouchard (37 saves / 40 shots)

April 1	Victoriaville Tigres	1 – 5	Moncton Wildcats	Colisée Desjardins	Recap
No scoring		First period	13:38 - Kelly Klíma (2); 17:11 - Campbell Pickard (1)
No scoring		Second period	No scoring
Pascal Laberge (3) - 3:20		Third period	1:58 - Kelly Klíma (3); 12:01 - sh - Manuel Wiederer (3); 16:54 - en - Stephen Johnson (4)
James Povall (30 saves / 34 shots)		Goalie stats	Keven Bouchard (23 saves / 24 shots)

Moncton wins series 4–1

=== (7) Cape Breton Screaming Eagles vs. (10) Chicoutimi Saguenéens ===
March 25	Cape Breton Screaming Eagles	1 – 3	Chicoutimi Saguenéens	Centre 200	Recap
6:05 - Michael Joly (1)		First period	No scoring
No scoring		Second period	Landon Schiller (1) - 2:33; Taylor Cooper (1) - pp - 10:29; Taylor Cooper (2) - 15:08
No scoring		Third period	No scoring
Alexandre Bélanger (40 saves / 43 shots)		Goalie stats	Julio Billia (50 saves / 51 shots)

March 26	Cape Breton Screaming Eagles	5 – 2	Chicoutimi Saguenéens	Centre 200	Recap
4:53 - Duncan MacIntyre (1)		First period	No scoring
4:37 - pp - Evgeny Svechnikov (1); 10:29 - Michael Joly (2)		Second period	Landon Schiller (2) - 9:00; Dmitry Zhukenov (1) - 19:41
13:47 - Massimo Carozza (1); 15:22 - Yannik Bertrand (1)		Third period	No scoring
Alexandre Bélanger (14 saves / 16 shots)		Goalie stats	Julio Billia (40 saves / 45 shots)

March 29	Chicoutimi Saguenéens	3 – 4	OT	Cape Breton Screaming Eagles	Centre Georges-Vézina	Recap
No scoring		First period		No scoring
No scoring		Second period		Maxim Lazarev (1) - pp - 1:06; Phélix Martineau (1) - 5:34; Maxim Lazarev (2) - pp - 19:40
2:17 - pp - Nicolas Roy (1); 6:08 - pp - Nicolas Roy (2); 14:58 - Alexandre Jacob (1)		Third period		No scoring
No scoring		First overtime period		Pierre-Luc Dubois (1) - 18:42
Julio Billia (37 saves / 41 shots)		Goalie stats		Alexandre Bélanger (38 saves / 41 shots)

March 30	Chicoutimi Saguenéens	5 – 4	Cape Breton Screaming Eagles	Centre Georges-Vézina	Recap
11:48 - Taylor Cooper (3); 16:03 - pp - Taylor Cooper (4)		First period	Maxim Lazarev (3) - pp - 18:30
1:47 - pp - Nicolas Roy (3)		Second period	Michael Joly (3) - pp - 11:27; Colin MacSween (1) - 16:40
4:21 - Timothé Simard (1); 17:49 - Antoine Marcoux (1)		Third period	Pierre-Luc Dubois (2) - pp - 18:58
Julio Billia (41 saves / 45 shots)		Goalie stats	Alexandre Bélanger (17 saves / 22 shots)

April 1	Chicoutimi Saguenéens	0 – 4	Cape Breton Screaming Eagles	Centre Georges-Vézina	Recap
No scoring		First period	17:16 - Dillon Boucher (1)
No scoring		Second period	7:59 - Maxim Lazarev (4); 15:09 - Massimo Carozza (2)
No scoring		Third period	6:04 - Giovanni Fiore (1)
Julio Billia (31 saves / 35 shots)		Goalie stats	Alexandre Bélanger (17 saves / 17 shots)

April 4	Cape Breton Screaming Eagles	7 – 4	Chicoutimi Saguenéens	Centre 200	Recap
Evgeny Svechnikov (2) - 1:20; Giovanni Fiore (2) - 7:13; Massimo Carozza (3) - pp - 8:36; Michael Joly (4) - 10:09		First period	11:30 - pp - Jonathan Bourcier (1)
Maxim Lazarev (5) - 15:24		Second period	No scoring
Giovanni Fiore (3) - 14:12; Pierre-Luc Dubois (3) - 16:00		Third period	7:16 - Dmitry Zhukenov (2); 8:39 - Dmitry Zhukenov (3); 10:18 - Frédéric Allard (1)
Alexandre Bélanger (28 saves / 32 shots)		Goalie stats	Julio Billia (24 saves / 31 shots)

Cape Breton wins series 4–2

=== (8) Rimouski Océanic vs. (9) Charlottetown Islanders ===
March 25	Rimouski Océanic	2 – 1	Charlottetown Islanders	Colisée de Rimouski	Recap
10:56 - pp - Samuel Laberge (1)		First period	No scoring
13:04 - sh - Dylan Montcalm (1)		Second period	No scoring
No scoring		Third period	Alexis Vanier (1) - 18:10
Louis-Philip Guindon (25 saves / 26 shots)		Goalie stats	Mason McDonald (31 saves / 33 shots)

March 26	Rimouski Océanic	4 – 5	OT	Charlottetown Islanders	Colisée de Rimouski	Recap
17:38 - pp - Dylan Montcalm (2)		First period		Oliver Cooper (1) - 0:24; Jake Coughler (1) - 5:13; Alexis Vanier (2) - pp - 11:55
6:00 - Carson MacKinnon (1); 16:06 - Jérémie Beaudin (1)		Second period		No scoring
8:23 - Antoine Dufort-Plante (1)		Third period		Jake Coughler (2) - 5:14
No scoring		First overtime period		Alexis Vanier (3) - pp - 12:13
Louis-Philip Guindon (44 saves / 49 shots)		Goalie stats		Mason McDonald (36 saves / 40 shots)

March 29	Charlottetown Islanders	8 – 2	Rimouski Océanic	Eastlink Centre	Recap
12:24 - pp - Oliver Cooper; 19:20 - Filip Chlapík (1)		First period	No scoring
0:19 - pp - Daniel Sprong (1); 15:24 - Filip Rydstrom (1); 18:40 - Will Thompson (1)		Second period	Matous Belohorsky (1) - 0:37
2:31 - pp - Luc Deschênes (1); 14:56 - Mitchell Balmas (1); 16:11 - pp - Luc Deschênes (2)		Third period	Deven St-Hilaire (1) - sh - 3:26
Mason McDonald (26 saves / 28 shots)		Goalie stats	Louis-Philip Guindon (17 saves / 22 shots); Alexandre Lagacé (29 saves / 32 shots)

March 30	Charlottetown Islanders	4 – 3	OT	Rimouski Océanic	Eastlink Centre	Recap
No scoring		First period		No scoring
1:08 - Kameron Kielly (1); 9:11 - Alexis Vanier (4); 15:02 - Filip Rydstrom (2)		Second period		Matous Belohorsky (2) - pp - 12:23
No scoring		Third period		Nicolas Werbik (1) - pp - 1:37; Jérémie Beaudin (2) - 2:37
6:31 - Samuel Blais (1)		First overtime period		No scoring
Mason McDonald (38 saves / 41 shots)		Goalie stats		Alexandre Lagacé (39 saves / 43 shots)

April 1	Rimouski Océanic	5 – 4	OT	Charlottetown Islanders	Colisée de Rimouski	Recap
No scoring		First period		Nicolas Leblond (1) - 4:25
7:16 - pp - Antoine Dufort-Plante (2); 18:48 - Dylan Montcalm (3)		Second period		Bradley Kennedy (1) - 9:09; Alexis Vanier (5) - pp - 18:26
13:44 - Tyler Boland (1); 18:28 - Hunter Moreau (1)		Third period		Samuel Blais (2) - 15:23
19:55 - Tyler Boland (2)		First overtime period		No scoring
Alexandre Lagacé (53 saves / 57 shots)		Goalie stats		Mason McDonald (40 saves / 45 shots)

April 3	Charlottetown Islanders	4 – 2	Rimouski Océanic	Eastlink Centre	Recap
1:50 - Daniel Sprong (2)		First period	No scoring
No scoring		Second period	Dominic Cormier (1) - 16:42; Antoine Dufort-Plante (3) - 17:59
1:33 - Samuel Blais (3); 5:41 - pp - Mitchell Balmas (2); 10:10 - Daniel Sprong (3)		Third period	No scoring
Mason McDonald (41 saves / 43 shots)		Goalie stats	Alexandre Lagacé (32 saves / 36 shots)

Charlottetown wins series 4–2

== Quarter-finals ==
=== (1) Rouyn-Noranda Huskies vs. (13) Blainville-Boisbriand Armada ===
April 8	Rouyn-Noranda Huskies	0 – 1	Blainville-Boisbriand Armada	Aréna Iamgold	Recap
No scoring		First period	No scoring
No scoring		Second period	Miguel Picard (2) - pp - 5:55
No scoring		Third period	No scoring
Chase Marchand (18 saves / 19 shots)		Goalie stats	Sam Montembeault (29 saves / 29 shots)

April 9	Rouyn-Noranda Huskies	5 – 0	Blainville-Boisbriand Armada	Aréna Iamgold	Recap
No scoring		First period	No scoring
3:21 - Gabriel Fontaine (3); 4:10 - Timo Meier (9); 9:45 - Peter Abbandonato (1)		Second period	No scoring
3:01 - pp - J.C. Beaudin (4); 17:26 - Julien Nantel (2)		Third period	No scoring
Chase Marchand (18 saves / 18 shots)		Goalie stats	Sam Montembeault (28 saves / 33 shots)

April 12	Blainville-Boisbriand Armada	0 – 1	OT	Rouyn-Noranda Huskies	Centre d'Excellence Sports Rousseau	Recap
No scoring		First period		No scoring
No scoring		Second period		No scoring
No scoring		Third period		No scoring
No scoring		First overtime period		Antoine Waked (3) - 2:41
Sam Montembeault (30 saves / 31 shots)		Goalie stats		Chase Marchand (17 saves / 17 shots)

April 13	Blainville-Boisbriand Armada	0 – 3	Rouyn-Noranda Huskies	Centre d'Excellence Sports Rousseau	Recap
No scoring		First period	Mārtiņš Dzierkals (2) - 13:47
No scoring		Second period	J.C. Beaudin (5) - pp - 3:27; J.C. Beaudin (6) - pp - 15:04
No scoring		Third period	No scoring
Sam Montembeault (30 saves / 33 shots); Francis Leclerc (12 saves / 12 shots)		Goalie stats	Chase Marchand (20 saves / 20 shots)

April 15	Rouyn-Noranda Huskies	5 – 1	Blainville-Boisbriand Armada	Aréna Iamgold	Recap
3:05 - Alexandre Fortin (2); 14:18 - Julien Nantel (3)		First period	Jan Dufek (4) - 8:15
4:25 - pp - Mārtiņš Dzierkals (3); 11:28 - pp - Nikolas Brouillard (3); 18:10 - Alexandre Fortin (3)		Second period	No scoring
No scoring		Third period	No scoring
Chase Marchand (16 saves / 17 shots); Samuel Harvey (4 saves / 4 shots)		Goalie stats	Sam Montembeault (20 saves / 24 shots); Francis Leclerc (2 saves / 3 shots)

Rouyn-Noranda wins series 4–1

=== (2) Shawinigan Cataractes vs. (9) Charlottetown Islanders ===
April 7	Shawinigan Cataractes	5 – 3	Charlottetown Islanders	Centre Bionest de Shawinigan	Recap
5:48 - Brandon Gignac (3); 10:50 - Alexis D'Aoust (6); 17:46 - sh - Danny Moynihan (3)		First period	No scoring
4:59 - Brandon Gignac (4); 16:48 - Gabriel Gagné (2)		Second period	Mitchell Balmas - 6:13 (3); Bradley Kennedy (2) - 11:41
No scoring		Third period	Keith Getson (1) - 5:06
Philippe Cadorette (29 saves / 32 shots)		Goalie stats	Mason McDonald (21 saves / 26 shots); Matthew Welsh (10 saves / 10 shots)

April 8	Shawinigan Cataractes	2 – 3	Charlottetown Islanders	Centre Bionest de Shawinigan	Recap
No scoring		First period	No scoring
1:46 - Dennis Yan (3)		Second period	Daniel Sprong (4) - 12:49; Oliver Cooper (3) - 13:41
Mathieu Olivier (1) – 14:33		Third period	Samuel Blais (4) - 17:16
Philippe Cadorette (28 saves / 31 shots)		Goalie stats	Mason McDonald (37 saves / 39 shots)

April 11	Charlottetown Islanders	4 – 3	Shawinigan Cataractes	Eastlink Centre	Recap
No scoring		First period	Anthony Beauvillier (3) - 3:53
1:48 - Mitchell Balmas (4); 3:18 - pp - Oliver Cooper (4)		Second period	Dmytro Timashov (3) - 4:16
2:38 - Mitchell Balmas (5); 12:39 - Keith Getson (2)		Third period	Anthony Beauvillier (4) - pp - 3:23
Mason McDonald (48 saves / 51 shots)		Goalie stats	Philippe Cadorette (40 saves / 44 shots)

April 12	Charlottetown Islanders	2 – 6	Shawinigan Cataractes	Eastlink Centre	Recap
No scoring		First period	Anthony Beauvillier (5) - pp - 7:26; Dennis Yan (4) - pp - 9:10
6:10 - Pierre-Olivier Joseph (1); 12:03 - pp - Oliver Cooper (5)		Second period	Gabriel Gagné (3) - 16:27
No scoring		Third period	Dmytro Timashov (4) - 0:38; Cavan Fitzgerald (3) - 6:54; Pascal Aquin (1) - 12:17
Mason McDonald (28 saves / 34 shots)		Goalie stats	Philippe Cadorette (28 saves / 30 shots)

April 14	Charlottetown Islanders	4 – 6	Shawinigan Cataractes	Eastlink Centre	Recap
No scoring		First period	15:32 - ps - Mathieu Olivier (2); 17:48 - Gabriel Gagné (4)
Kameron Kielly (2) - 7:49; Alexis Vanier (6) - 8:49; Oliver Cooper (6) - pp - 14:07; Filip Rydstrom (3) - 17:02		Second period	5:14 - sh - Samuel Blier (1); 7:19 - pp - Alexis D'Aoust (7)
No scoring		Third period	6:40 - Gabriel Gagné (5); 19:56 - en - Dmytro Timashov (5)
Mason McDonald (19 saves / 24 shots)		Goalie stats	Philippe Cadorette (31 saves / 35 shots)

April 17	Shawinigan Cataractes	6 – 1	Charlottetown Islanders	Centre Bionest de Shawinigan	Recap
Alex Pawelczyk (2) - pp - 19:45		First period	No scoring
Anthony Beauvillier (6) - 8:04; Gabriel Gagné (6) - pp - 11:30; Dmytro Timashov (6) - pp - 16:43; Dmytro Timashov (7) - pp - 17:21		Second period	14:07 - Bradley Kennedy (3)
Alex Pawelczyk (3) - 15:14		Third period	No scoring
Philippe Cadorette (29 saves / 30 shots)		Goalie stats	Mason McDonald (39 saves / 45 shots)

Shawinigan wins series 4–2

=== (3) Saint John Sea Dogs vs. (7) Cape Breton Screaming Eagles ===
April 7	Saint John Sea Dogs	1 – 4	Cape Breton Screaming Eagles	Harbour Station	Recap
No scoring		First period	Pierre-Luc Dubois (4) - pp - 19:38
17:14 - Samuel Dove-McFalls (3)		Second period	Michael Joly (5) - 8:15
No scoring		Third period	Michael Joly (6) - pp - 9:16; Michael Joly (7) - pp - 11:26
Marc-Antoine Turcotte (29 saves / 33 shots)		Goalie stats	Alexandre Bélanger (25 saves / 26 shots)

April 9	Saint John Sea Dogs	4 – 3	OT	Cape Breton Screaming Eagles	Harbour Station	Recap
13:10 - pp - Sam Povorozniouk (7); 19:49 - Sam Povorozniouk (8)		First period		No scoring
No scoring		Second period		Michael Joly (8) - sh - 8:13; Yannik Bertrand (2) - 12:43
13:57 - Joe Veleno (2)		Third period		Pierre-Luc Dubois (5) - 1:26
7:35 - Joe Veleno (3)		First overtime period		No scoring
Marc-Antoine Turcotte (26 saves / 29 shots)		Goalie stats		Alexandre Bélanger (38 saves / 42 shots)

April 11	Cape Breton Screaming Eagles	2 – 5	Saint John Sea Dogs	Centre 200	Recap
No scoring		First period	Matthew Highmore (2) - 15:47; Spencer Smallman (1) - pp - 18:30
4:53 - pp - Loik LéveilléLoik Léveillé		Second period	Jordan King (1) - 2:46; Matthew Highmore (3) - pp – 14:10
2:19 - Giovanni Fiore (4)		Third period	Bokondji Imama (1) - 18:30
Alexandre Bélanger (14 saves / 18 shots); Daryl MacCallum (11 saves / 12 shots)		Goalie stats	Marc-Antoine Turcotte (20 saves / 22 shots)

April 12	Cape Breton Screaming Eagles	4 – 1	Saint John Sea Dogs	Centre 200	Recap
2:20 - pp - Giovanni Fiore (5)		First period	No scoring
No scoring		Second period	Jakub Zbořil (1) - pp – 9:09
8:36 - Phélix Martineau (2); 10:06 - pp - Pierre-Luc Dubois (6); 11:49 - Evgeny Svechnikov (3)		Third period	No scoring
Alexandre Bélanger (32 saves / 33 shots)		Goalie stats	Marc-Antoine Turcotte (32 saves / 36 shots)

April 15	Saint John Sea Dogs	3 – 4	OT	Cape Breton Screaming Eagles	Harbour Station	Recap
10:51 - pp - Matthew Highmore (4); 13:45 - pp - Daniel Del Paggio (2)		First period		Michael Joly (9) - pp – 14:45
No scoring		Second period		Jordan-Ty Fournier (1) - 2:20
4:58 - Matthew Highmore (5)		Third period		Michael Joly (10) - 12:54
No scoring		First overtime period		Giovanni Fiore (6) - 7:25
Marc-Antoine Turcotte (22 saves / 26 shots)		Goalie stats		Alexandre Bélanger (38 saves / 41 shots)

April 17	Cape Breton Screaming Eagles	4 – 5	Saint John Sea Dogs	Centre 200	Recap
10:22 - Clark Bishop (1); 12:30 - Giovanni Fiore (7)		First period	Spencer Smallman (2) - 6:42; Matthew Highmore (6) - 17:31; Sam Povorozniouk (9) - ps - 18:03
9:53 - Giovanni Fiore (8); 16:55 - Pierre-Luc Dubois (7)		Second period	Matthew Highmore (7) - pp - 5:17
No scoring		Third period	Sam Povorozniouk (10) - pp - 10:59
Alexandre Bélanger (26 saves / 31 shots)		Goalie stats	Marc-Antoine Turcotte (20 saves / 24 shots)

April 19	Saint John Sea Dogs	6 – 2	Cape Breton Screaming Eagles	Harbour Station	Recap
No scoring		First period	No scoring
7:36 - Nathan Noel (2); 12:11 - Matt Murphy (3); 15:14 - Daniel Del Paggio (3)		Second period	Michael Joly (11) - pp - 7:07
2:38 - Nathan Noel (3); 9:57 - Sam Povorozniouk (11); 19:44 - sh - en - Jakub Zbořil (2)		Third period	Evgeny Svechnikov (4) - 11:00
Marc-Antoine Turcotte (29 saves / 31 shots)		Goalie stats	Alexandre Bélanger (24 saves / 29 shots)

Saint John wins series 4–3

=== (5) Gatineau Olympiques vs. (6) Moncton Wildcats ===
April 8	Gatineau Olympiques	1 – 3	Moncton Wildcats	Centre Robert Guertin	Recap
18:37 - Nicolas Meloche (1)		First period	Manuel Wiederer (4) - 15:26
No scoring		Second period	No scoring
No scoring		Third period	Václav Karabáček (3) - 9:52; Zack MacEwen (4) - en - 19:32
Mathieu Bellemare (30 saves / 32 shots)		Goalie stats	Keven Bouchard (28 saves / 29 shots)

April 9	Gatineau Olympiques	3 – 0	Moncton Wildcats	Centre Robert Guertin	Recap
19:01 - pp - Alex Dostie (2); 19:20 - pp - Alex Dostie (3)		First period	No scoring
9:43 - Gabryel Paquin-Boudreau (6)		Second period	No scoring
No scoring		Third period	No scoring
Mathieu Bellemare (26 saves / 26 shots)		Goalie stats	Keven Bouchard (28 saves / 31 shots)

April 12	Moncton Wildcats	1 – 7	Gatineau Olympiques	Moncton Coliseum	Recap
6:38 - Václav Karabáček (4)		First period	Yan-Pavel Laplante (2) - 12:57
No scoring		Second period	Chiwetin Blacksmith (1) - 1:57; Alex Dostie (4) - 5:35
No scoring		Third period	Alexandre Landreville (1) - 3:04; Alex Dostie (5) - 9:13; Chiwetin Blacksmith (2) - 12:24; Austin Eastman (2) - pp - 17:57
Keven Bouchard (14 saves / 18 shots); Blade Mann-Dixon (2 saves / 5 shots)		Goalie stats	Mathieu Bellemare (37 saves / 38 shots)

April 13	Moncton Wildcats	2 – 1	OT	Gatineau Olympiques	Moncton Coliseum	Recap
No scoring		First period		No scoring
6:07 - Manuel Wiederer (5)		Second period		No scoring
No scoring		Third period		Alexandre Alain (2) - 19:47
9:17 - Cameron Askew (2)		First overtime period		No scoring
Keven Bouchard (31 saves / 32 shots)		Goalie stats		Mathieu Bellemare (26 saves / 28 shots)

April 15	Moncton Wildcats	6 – 4	Gatineau Olympiques	Moncton Coliseum	Recap
No scoring		First period	0:51 - Gabryel Paquin-Boudreau (7)
Zachary Malatesta (1) - 3:20		Second period	11:07 - Austin Eastman (3); 16:12 - Alex Dostie (6)
Manuel Wiederer (6) - 1:24; Austin Kosack (1) - pp - 7:10; Stephen Johnson (5) - 12:21; Manuel Wiederer (7) - 13:45; Manuel Wiederer (8) - en - 19:58		Third period	0:48 - Yan-Pavel Laplante (3)
Keven Bouchard (24 saves / 28 shots)		Goalie stats	Mathieu Bellemare (30 saves / 35 shots)

April 18	Gatineau Olympiques	2 – 7	Moncton Wildcats	Centre Robert Guertin	Recap
No scoring		First period	0:54 - Manuel Wiederer (9); 4:02 - Cameron Askew (3); 4:52 - pp - Manuel Wiederer (10); 10:34 - Cameron Askew (4)
Vitalii Abramov (6) - 8:38; Vitalii Abramov (7) - 16:55		Second period	No scoring
No scoring		Third period	6:30 - pp - Zachary Malatesta (2); 15:13 - en - Manuel Wiederer (11); 18:37 - pp - Kevin Klíma (1)
Mathieu Bellemare (2 saves / 5 shots); Mark Grametbauer (24 saves / 27 shots)		Goalie stats	Keven Bouchard (22 saves / 24 shots)

Moncton wins series 4–2

== Semi-finals ==
=== (1) Rouyn-Noranda Huskies vs. (6) Moncton Wildcats ===
April 22	Rouyn-Noranda Huskies	4 – 1	Moncton Wildcats	Aréna Iamgold	Recap
3:31 - pp - Timo Meier (10); 19:01 - Peter Abbandonato (2)		First period	Conor Garland (4) - pp - 6:32
2:22 - A.J. Greer (6)		Second period	No scoring
6:11 - Francis Perron (4)		Third period	No scoring
Chase Marchand (26 saves / 27 shots)		Goalie stats	Keven Bouchard (23 saves / 27 shots); Blade Mann-Dixon (6 saves / 6 shots)

April 23	Rouyn-Noranda Huskies	4 – 5	Moncton Wildcats	Aréna Iamgold	Recap
4:35 - Zachary Lauzon (2); 6:39 - pp - Nikolas Brouillard (4)		First period	Will Smith (2) - 1:31; Stephen Johnson (6) - 18:25
No scoring		Second period	No scoring
10:22 - Francis Perron (5); 19:31 - Jacob Neveu (1)		Third period	Kevin Klíma (2) - 7:19; Václav Karabáček (5) - 17:07; Stephen Johnson (7) - en - 19:16
Chase Marchand (26 saves / 30 shots)		Goalie stats	Keven Bouchard (17 saves / 21 shots)

April 26	Moncton Wildcats	1 – 5	Rouyn-Noranda Huskies	Moncton Coliseum	Recap
No scoring		First period	Francis Perron (6) - 1:01
No scoring		Second period	Francis Perron (7) - sh - 6:14; A.J. Greer (7) - 7:44
2:52 - Conor Garland (5)		Third period	Francis Perron (8) - 13:30; Julien Nantel (4) - en - 19:59
Keven Bouchard (37 saves / 41 shots)		Goalie stats	Chase Marchand (23 saves / 24 shots)

April 27	Moncton Wildcats	0 – 1	Rouyn-Noranda Huskies	Moncton Coliseum	Recap
No scoring		First period	Mārtiņš Dzierkals (4) - 0:58
No scoring		Second period	No scoring
No scoring		Third period	No scoring
Keven Bouchard (28 saves / 29 shots)		Goalie stats	Chase Marchand (35 saves / 35 shots)

April 29	Rouyn-Noranda Huskies	1 – 2	Moncton Wildcats	Aréna Iamgold	Recap
No scoring		First period	No scoring
3:01 - Peter Abbandonato (3)		Second period	Austin Kosack (2) - pp - 5:21; Václav Karabáček (6) - 17:05
No scoring		Third period	No scoring
Keven Bouchard (34 saves / 35 shots)		Goalie stats	Chase Marchand (27 saves / 29 shots)

May 1	Moncton Wildcats	4 – 5	Rouyn-Noranda Huskies	Moncton Coliseum	Recap
7:46 - sh - Stephen Johnson (8)		First period	No scoring
14:29 - pp - Cameron Askew (5); 15:30 - pp - Manuel Wiederer (12); 18:47 - ps - Cameron Askew (6)		Second period	Francis Perron (9) - 18:18; J.C. Beaudin (7) - 19:26
No scoring		Third period	Mathieu Boucher (1) - 0:52; Mathieu Boucher (2) - 17:24; Francis Perron (10) - 18:26
Keven Bouchard (34 saves / 39 shots)		Goalie stats	Chase Marchand (29 saves / 33 shots)

Rouyn-Noranda wins series 4–2

=== (2) Shawinigan Cataractes vs. (3) Saint John Sea Dogs ===
April 22	Saint John Sea Dogs	6 – 5	OT	Shawinigan Cataractes	Harbour Station	Recap
Sam Povorozniouk (12) - 12:22		First period		5:15 - pp - Alex Pawelczyk (4); 13:12 - Anthony Beauvillier (7)
Daniel Del Paggio (4) - pp - 1:00; Joe Veleno (4) - 12:37; Samuel Dove-McFalls (4) - 19:32		Second period		14:05 - Dmytro Timashov (8)
Spencer Smallman (3) - 15:57		Third period		9:56 - Dennis Yan (5); 12:18 - Gabriel Gagné (7) – 12:18
Matthew Highmore (8) - 0:46		First overtime period		No scoring
Marc-Antoine Turcotte (26 saves / 31 shots)		Goalie stats		Philippe Cadorette (19 saves / 25 shots)

April 23	Saint John Sea Dogs	1 – 7	Shawinigan Cataractes	Harbour Station	Recap
Matthew Highmore (9) - pp - 12:04		First period	8:47 - Alexis D'Aoust (8); 14:54 - pp - Brandon Gignac (5)
No scoring		Second period	15:02 - pp - Anthony Beauvillier (8); 17:44 - Dennis Yan (6)
No scoring		Third period	6:37 - pp - Anthony Beauvillier (9); 13:17 - pp - Dennis Yan (7); 19:54 - pp - Gabriel Sylvestre (1)
Marc-Antoine Turcotte (26 saves / 31 shots); Alex Bishop (8 saves / 10 shots)		Goalie stats	Philippe Cadorette (26 saves / 27 shots)

April 26	Shawinigan Cataractes	7 – 3	Saint John Sea Dogs	Centre Bionest de Shawinigan	Recap
Brandon Gignac (6) - 13:18		First period	16:17 - Kyle Ward (1)
Brandon Gignac (7) - 17:09		Second period	3:57 - Samuel Dove-McFalls (5); 15:36 - Sam Povorozniouk (13)
Dmytro Timashov (9) - 5:31; Mathieu Olivier (3) - 5:52; Gabriel Gagné (8) - 9:14; Gabriel Gagné (9) - 14:23; Dmytro Timashov (10) - en - 18:42		Third period	No scoring
Philippe Cadorette (26 saves / 29 shots)		Goalie stats	Marc-Antoine Turcotte (18 saves / 24 shots)

April 27	Shawinigan Cataractes	4 – 3	OT	Saint John Sea Dogs	Centre Bionest de Shawinigan	Recap
No scoring		First period		18:30 - pp - Sam Povorozniouk (14)
Gabriel Sylvestre (2) - 4:47; Anthony Beauvillier (10) - 9:00		Second period		17:04 - Samuel Dove-McFalls (6)
Dmytro Timashov (11) - 2:13		Third period		5:31 - Joe Veleno (5)
Danny Moynihan (4) - 0:46		First overtime period		No scoring
Philippe Cadorette (36 saves / 39 shots)		Goalie stats		Alex Bishop (20 saves / 24 shots)

April 29	Saint John Sea Dogs	3 – 6	Shawinigan Cataractes	Harbour Station	Recap
No scoring		First period	0:44 - Alex Pawelczyk (5); 5:00 - pp - Anthony Beauvillier (11)
Matt Murphy (4) - pp - 4:27		Second period	5:42 - Anthony Beauvillier (12); 13:28 - Dennis Yan (8)
Joe Veleno (6) - pp - 7:36; Thomas Chabot (3) - 8:10		Third period	13:25 - sh - Alex Pawelczyk (6); 17:31 - en - Dmytro Timashov (12)
Marc-Antoine Turcotte (11 saves / 14 shots); Alex Bishop (11 saves / 13 shots)		Goalie stats	Philippe Cadorette (33 saves / 36 shots)

Shawinigan wins series 4–1

== President's Cup Finals ==
=== (1) Rouyn-Noranda Huskies vs. (2) Shawinigan Cataractes ===
May 4	Rouyn-Noranda Huskies	4 – 2	Shawinigan Cataractes	Aréna Iamgold	Recap
17:42 - A.J. Greer (8)		First period	Sam Girard (2) - pp - 15:42
No scoring		Second period	No scoring
14:39 - pp - Philippe Myers (2); 18:51 - Nikolas Brouillard (5); 19:19 - en - Gabriel Fontaine (4)		Third period	Gabriel Gagné (10) - pp - 4:25
Chase Marchand (28 saves / 30 shots)		Goalie stats	Philippe Cadorette (20 saves / 23 shots)

May 7*	Rouyn-Noranda Huskies	4 – 1	Shawinigan Cataractes	Aréna Iamgold	Recap
7:27 - Peter Abbandonato (4); 13:40 - A.J. Greer (9)		First period	Anthony Beauvillier (13) - 8:23
7:54 - pp - A.J. Greer (10)		Second period	No scoring
4:45 - Francis Perron (11)		Third period	No scoring
Chase Marchand (29 saves / 30 shots)		Goalie stats	Philippe Cadorette (33 saves / 37 shots); Mikhail Denisov (5 saves / 5 shots)

May 8	Shawinigan Cataractes	1 – 2	Rouyn-Noranda Huskies	Centre Bionest de Shawinigan	Recap
5:26 - Anthony Beauvillier (14)		First period	Antoine Waked (4) - 12:19
No scoring		Second period	No scoring
No scoring		Third period	A.J. Greer (11) - pp - 3:46
Philippe Cadorette (39 saves / 41 shots); Mikhail Denisov (0 saves / 0 shots)		Goalie stats	Chase Marchand (22 saves / 23 shots)

May 10**	Shawinigan Cataractes	6 – 4	Rouyn-Noranda Huskies	Centre Bionest de Shawinigan	Recap
4:00 - pp - Alexis D'Aoust (9)		First period	No scoring
4:57 - pp - Alex Pawelczyk (7); 8:54 - Dennis Yan (9)		Second period	Mārtiņš Dzierkals (5) - 9:34; Francis Perron (12) - pp - 18:20
1:30 - Gabriel Gagné (11); 14:04 - pp - Anthony Beauvillier (15); 19:56 - en - Dmytro Timashov (13)		Third period	Philippe Myers (3) - pp - 8:16; Gabriel Fontaine (5) - 8:54
Philippe Cadorette (33 saves / 37 shots)		Goalie stats	Chase Marchand (9 saves / 12 shots); Samuel Harvey (6 saves / 8 shots)

May 12	Rouyn-Noranda Huskies	7 – 2	Shawinigan Cataractes	Aréna Iamgold	Recap
1:44 - pp - A.J. Greer (12); 7:38 - Timo Meier (11); 15:56 - Mārtiņš Dzierkals (6); 19:36 - pp - Philippe Myers (4)		First period	Charles Taillon (1) - 12:15
11:08 - Alexandre Fortin (4); 19:08 - Mathieu Boucher (3)		Second period	No scoring
2:17 - Mārtiņš Dzierkals (7)		Third period	Dennis Yan (10) - pp - 0:43
Chase Marchand (15 saves / 17 shots)		Goalie stats	Philippe Cadorette (32 saves / 39 shots)

Rouyn-Noranda wins series 4–1

*–Due to a sudden technical issue with the ice at Aréna Iamgold during the first intermission, Game 2 was postponed from the evening of May 6 to the late afternoon of May 7. Originally, it was reported that the game would be restarted from the beginning. However it was later clarified by the QMJHL that the game would start at the beginning of the second period with a 2–1 lead for Rouyn-Noranda, as it was when the game was postponed.
**–Due to Game 2 being postponed to May 7, the QMJHL decided to delay Game 4 from May 9 to May 10.

== Playoff scoring leaders ==
Note: GP = Games played; G = Goals; A = Assists; Pts = Points; PIM = Penalty minutes

Player	Team	GP	G	A	Pts	PIM
Francis Perron	Rouyn-Noranda Huskies	18	12	21	33	11
Anthony Beauvillier	Shawinigan Cataractes	21	15	15	30	16
Dmytro Timashov	Shawinigan Cataractes	21	13	15	28	40
Alexis D'Aoust	Shawinigan Cataractes	21	9	17	26	18
Sam Povorozniouk	Saint John Sea Dogs	17	14	11	25	12
Timo Meier	Rouyn-Noranda Huskies	18	11	12	23	30
A.J. Greer	Rouyn-Noranda Huskies	20	12	10	22	28
Gabriel Gagné	Shawinigan Cataractes	21	11	11	22	22
Samuel Girard	Shawinigan Cataractes	21	2	20	22	4
Thomas Chabot	Saint John Sea Dogs	17	3	18	21	13

== Playoff leading goaltenders ==
Note: GP = Games played; Mins = Minutes played; W = Wins; L = Losses: OTL = Overtime losses; SL = Shootout losses; GA = Goals Allowed; SO = Shutouts; GAA = Goals against average

Player	Team	GP	Mins	W	L	GA	SO	Sv%	GAA
Chase Marchand	Rouyn-Noranda Huskies	19	1068	15	3	24	6	.946	1.35
Mathieu Bellemare	Gatineau Olympiques	9	489	5	4	18	2	.913	2.21
Sam Montembeault	Blainville-Boisbriand Armada	11	685	5	6	28	1	.925	2.45
Étienne Montpetit	Val-d'Or Foreurs	6	410	2	4	19	0	.885	2.78
Keven Bouchard	Moncton Wildcats	17	1054	10	7	49	0	.909	2.79

== Trophies and awards ==
- President's Cup – Playoff Champions: Rouyn-Noranda Huskies
- Jean Rougeau Trophy – Regular Season Champions: Rouyn-Noranda Huskies
- Luc Robitaille Trophy – Team that scored the most goals: Rouyn-Noranda Huskies
- Robert Lebel Trophy – Team with best GAA: Gatineau Olympiques

Player

- Michel Brière Memorial Trophy – Most Valuable Player: Francis Perron, Rouyn-Noranda Huskies
- Jean Béliveau Trophy – Top Scorer: Conor Garland, Moncton Wildcats
- Guy Lafleur Trophy – Playoff MVP: Francis Perron, Rouyn-Noranda Huskies
- Jacques Plante Memorial Trophy – Top Goaltender: Chase Marchand, Rouyn-Noranda Huskies
- Guy Carbonneau Trophy – Best Defensive Forward: Shawn Ouellette-St-Amant, Val-d'Or Foreurs
- Emile Bouchard Trophy – Defenceman of the Year: Samuel Girard, Shawinigan Cataractes
- Kevin Lowe Trophy – Best Defensive Defenceman: Allan Carron, Rouyn-Noranda Huskies
- Michael Bossy Trophy – Top Prospect: Pierre-Luc Dubois, Cape Breton Screaming Eagles
- RDS Cup – Rookie of the Year: Vitalii Abramov, Gatineau Olympiques
- Michel Bergeron Trophy – Offensive Rookie of the Year: Vitalii Abramov, Gatineau Olympiques
- Raymond Lagacé Trophy – Defensive Rookie of the Year: Mathieu Bellemare, Gatineau Olympiques
- Frank J. Selke Memorial Trophy – Most sportsmanlike player: Samuel Girard, Shawinigan Cataractes
- QMJHL Humanitarian of the Year – Humanitarian of the Year: Samuel Laberge, Rimouski Océanic
- Marcel Robert Trophy – Best Scholastic Player: Alexis D'Aoust, Shawinigan Cataractes
- Paul Dumont Trophy – Personality of the Year: Pierre-Luc Dubois, Cape Breton Screaming Eagles

Executive

- Ron Lapointe Trophy – Coach of the Year: Gilles Bouchard, Rouyn-Noranda Huskies
- Maurice Filion Trophy – General Manager of the Year: Gilles Bouchard, Rouyn-Noranda Huskies
- John Horman Trophy – Executive of the Year: Louis Painchaud, Quebec Remparts
- Jean Sawyer Trophy – Marketing Director of the Year: Quebec Remparts

=== All-Star teams ===
First All-Star Team:

- Étienne Montpetit, Goaltender, Val-d'Or Foreurs
- Philippe Myers, Defenceman, Rouyn-Noranda Huskies
- Samuel Girard, Defenceman, Shawinigan Cataractes
- Nicolas Roy, Centre, Chicoutimi Saguenéens
- Francis Perron, Left Wing, Rouyn-Noranda Huskies
- Conor Garland, Right Wing, Moncton Wildcats

Second All-Star Team:

- Julio Billia, Goaltender, Chicoutimi Saguenéens
- Thomas Chabot, Defenceman, Saint John Sea Dogs
- Jérémy Lauzon, Defenceman, Rouyn-Noranda Huskies
- Anthony Beauregard, Centre, Val-d'Or Foreurs
- Pierre-Luc Dubois, Left Wing, Cape Breton Screaming Eagles
- Alexis D'Aoust, Right Wing, Shawinigan Cataractes

All-Rookie Team:

- Mathieu Bellemare, Goaltender, Gatineau Olympiques
- Zachary Lauzon, Defenceman, Rouyn-Noranda Huskies
- Pascal Corbeil, Defenceman, Blainville-Boisbriand Armada
- Antoine Morand, Centre, Acadie–Bathurst Titan
- Max Comtois, Left Wing, Victoriaville Tigres
- Vitalii Abramov, Right Wing, Gatineau Olympiques

== See also ==
- List of QMJHL seasons
- 2015 in ice hockey
- 2016 in ice hockey
- 2015–16 OHL season
- 2015–16 WHL season
- 2016 Memorial Cup

Preceded by 2014–15 QMJHL season	QMJHL seasons	Succeeded by 2016–17 QMJHL season
