= Lisa Benson (engineering educator) =

American engineering educator

Lisa Clemence Benson is an American expert in engineering education, a professor emerita in the Department of Engineering and Science Education at Clemson University, and the former editor-in-chief of the Journal of Engineering Education. Her research specialties include student motivation, computational thinking, and active learning.

== Education and career ==
Benson majored in bioengineering at the University of Vermont, graduating in 1982. She came to Clemson University as a graduate student in bioengineering; she received a master's degree in 1986 and completed her Ph.D. in 2002. Her dissertation, Development of clinically relevant loading patterns for force-controlled knee joint simulation, was supervised by Martine LaBerge.

When Clemson founded its Department of Engineering and Science Education in 2006, she became the first faculty member in the department. She has since retired to become a professor emerita.

She was editor-in-chief of the Journal of Engineering Education from 2017 until 2022.

== Recognition ==
In 2018, Clemson University gave Benson their Class of ‘39 Award for Excellence. She was elected as a Fellow of the American Society for Engineering Education in 2019.
