= J.C. Beaudin =

Canadian ice hockey player (born 1997)

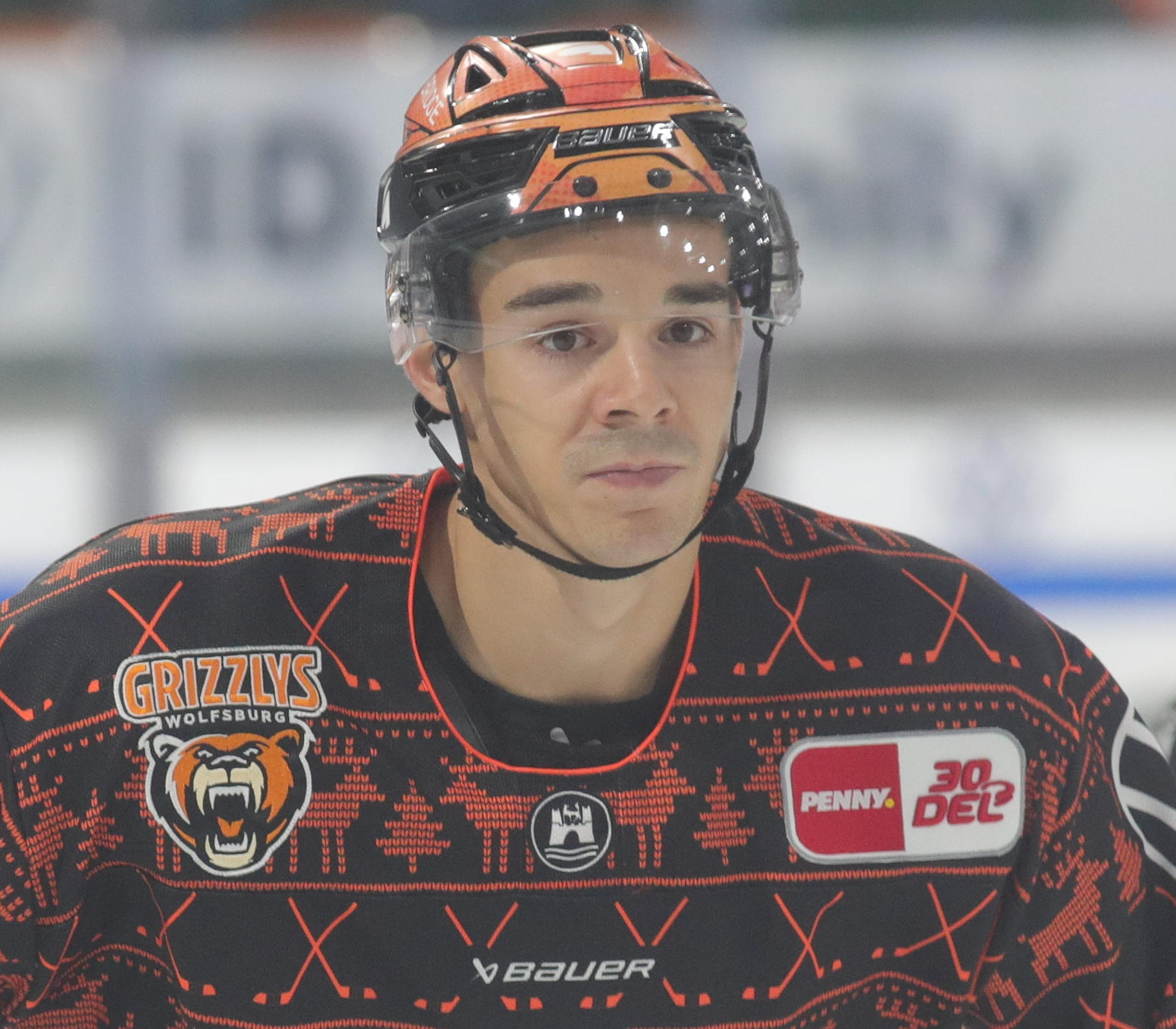
- Beaudin with Grizzlys Wolfsburg in 2023
- Born: March 27, 1997 (age 29) Longueuil, Quebec, Canada
- Height: 6 ft 1 in (185 cm)
- Weight: 196 lb (89 kg; 14 st 0 lb)
- Position: Centre
- Shoots: Right
- DEL team Former teams: Straubing Tigers; Ottawa Senators; Grizzlys Wolfsburg; HC TPS; HC Sochi
- NHL draft: 71st overall, 2015; Colorado Avalanche
- Playing career: 2017–present

Jean-Christophe Beaudin (born March 27, 1997) is a Canadian professional ice hockey forward who currently plays for Straubing Tigers of the Deutsche Eishockey Liga (DEL). He was selected 71st overall by the Colorado Avalanche in the 2015 NHL entry draft.

== Playing career ==
Beaudin began playing hockey at the Bantam and Midget levels in the Quebec area before he was selected 74th overall by the Rouyn-Noranda Huskies at the 2013 QMJHL Entry Draft.

In his first full season with the Huskies in 2014–15, Beaudin played a two-way game and showed offensive potential as a rookie in posting 14 goals and 53 points through 68 games. In his first eligible draft year, he was selected by the Colorado Avalanche in the third round, 71st overall, in the 2015 NHL entry draft. Beaudin continued his development in the QMJHL, assuming top-line duties playing alongside Francis Perron, he placed second in team scoring with 82 points in just 58 games in the 2015–16 season. He contributed with 19 points in 17 post-season games to help claim the President's Cup and earn a berth in the 2016 Memorial Cup, before losing to the London Knights in the title game.

While completing his fourth and final season with the Huskies in the 2016–17 season, Beaudin was signed to a three-year, entry-level contract with the Colorado Avalanche on March 7, 2017.

Beaudin was assigned by the Avalanche to begin the 2017–18 season and start his professional career with a secondary affiliate, the Colorado Eagles of the ECHL. Beaudin made his pro debut on opening night for the Eagles in a 3–2 victory over the Utah Grizzlies on October 14, 2017. He was later recalled to the primary affiliate, the San Antonio Rampage of the AHL, and split the campaign between the clubs. He registered his first AHL goal and multi-point game in a 4–3 victory over the Iowa Wild on December 2, 2017. Beaudin finished with 7 points in 34 games for the Rampage before returning to the ECHL for the post-season, helping the Eagles defend the Kelly Cup in a top-line role, amassing 18 points in 22 games.

With the Eagles' elevation to the AHL as the Avalanche's new primary affiliate, Beaudin remained with the team to begin the 2018–19 season. After contributing with only 13 points in 42 games with the Eagles, Beaudin was traded by the Avalanche to the Ottawa Senators in exchange for Max McCormick on February 6, 2019. He was immediately assigned to Ottawa's AHL affiliate, the Belleville Senators for the remainder of the season, adding 3 points in 20 contests.

In his first training camp with the Senators, Beaudin impressed leading into the 2019–20 season, before he was assigned to Belleville Senators. He played in 2 games with Belleville before receiving his first recall by the Senators to the NHL on October 21, 2019. He made his NHL debut with the Senators playing a fourth-line role in a 5–2 victory over the Detroit Red Wings on October 23, 2019. In his 8th career game Beaudin registered his first point, an assist on a Filip Chlapík goal, in a 4–1 win over the Carolina Hurricanes on November 9, 2019.

Following his third season within the Senators organization, Beaudin as an impending restricted free agent, was not tendered a qualifying offer by Ottawa and was released to free agency. On July 29, 2021, Beaudin was signed to a one-year AHL contract with the Laval Rocket, the primary affiliate of the Montreal Canadiens. In the following 2021–22 season, Beaudin featured in 41 regular season games over the year, contributing with 4 goals and 17 points.

As a free agent, Beaudin opted to sign his first European contract after agreeing to a one-year deal with German club, Grizzlys Wolfsburg of the Deutsche Eishockey Liga (DEL), on July 27, 2022.

After a two-year stint with the Grizzlys, Beaudin left Germany as a free agent and was signed to a one-year contract with Finnish club, HC TPS of the Liiga, for the 2024–25 season on August 7, 2024.

At the conclusion of his contract with TPS, Beaudin left after his lone season in Finland to sign a one-year contract with Russian club, HC Sochi of the Kontinental Hockey League, on June 2, 2025. At the beginning of 2026–27 season, Beaudin returned to the DEL in signing a one-year contract with the Straubing Tigers on August 1, 2026.

== Career statistics ==
			Regular season					Playoffs
Season	Team	League	GP	G	A	Pts	PIM	GP	G	A	Pts	PIM
2012–13	Collège Antoine-Girouard Gaulois	QMAAA	26	3	8	11	8	13	1	1	2	8
2013–14	Collège Antoine-Girouard Gaulois	QMAAA	40	19	28	47	42	3	0	0	0	0
2013–14	Rouyn-Noranda Huskies	QMJHL	4	0	0	0	0	2	0	0	0	0
2014–15	Rouyn-Noranda Huskies	QMJHL	68	14	39	53	29	6	1	4	5	4
2015–16	Rouyn-Noranda Huskies	QMJHL	58	33	49	82	34	17	7	12	19	8
2016–17	Rouyn-Noranda Huskies	QMJHL	65	30	50	80	33	13	8	12	20	2
2017–18	Colorado Eagles	ECHL	30	7	20	27	10	22	10	8	18	6
2017–18	San Antonio Rampage	AHL	34	2	5	7	10	—	—	—	—	—
2018–19	Colorado Eagles	AHL	42	6	7	13	18	—	—	—	—	—
2018–19	Belleville Senators	AHL	20	1	2	3	2	—	—	—	—	—
2019–20	Belleville Senators	AHL	13	4	2	6	2	—	—	—	—	—
2019–20	Ottawa Senators	NHL	22	0	1	1	7	—	—	—	—	—
2020–21	Belleville Senators	AHL	34	6	10	16	11	—	—	—	—	—
2021–22	Laval Rocket	AHL	41	4	13	17	33	3	0	0	0	0
2022–23	Grizzlys Wolfsburg	DEL	43	13	12	25	8	14	4	5	9	4
2023–24	Grizzlys Wolfsburg	DEL	47	9	14	23	24	2	0	0	0	0
2024–25	HC TPS	Liiga	57	15	27	42	26	5	0	2	2	0
2025–26	HC Sochi	KHL	51	5	10	15	23	—	—	—	—	—
NHL totals			22	0	1	1	7	—	—	—	—	—
KHL totals			51	5	10	15	23	—	—	—	—	—

== Awards and honours ==
Award	Year
QMJHL
President's Cup (Rouyn-Noranda Huskies)	2016
ECHL
Kelly Cup (Colorado Eagles)	2018
