= Gabriel Gagné =

Canadian ice hockey player

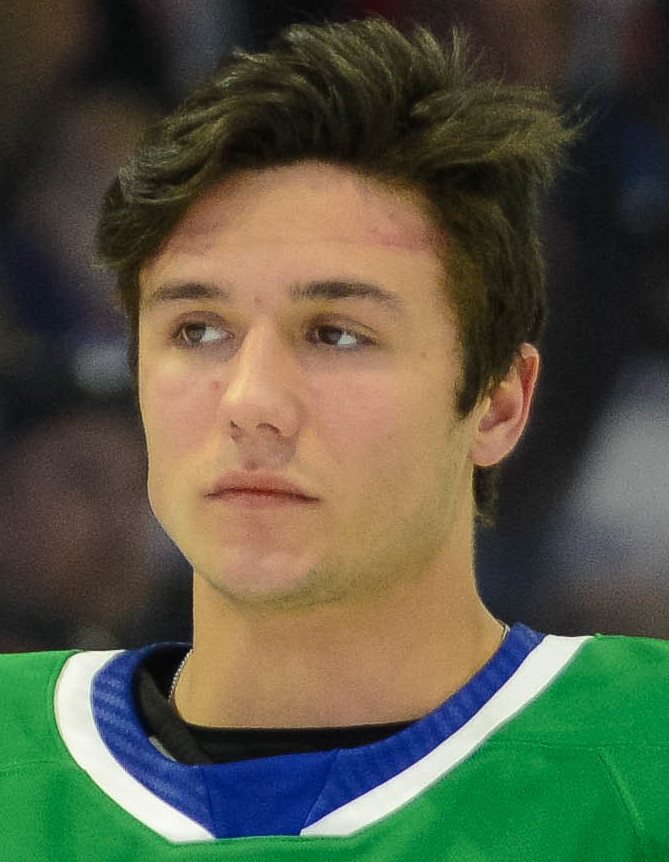
- Gagné at the 2018 AHL All-Star Game
- Born: November 11, 1996 (age 29) Sainte-Adèle, Quebec, Canada
- Height: 6 ft 5 in (196 cm)
- Weight: 186 lb (84 kg; 13 st 4 lb)
- Position: Right wing
- Shot: Right
- Played for: Binghamton Senators; Belleville Senators; Toronto Marlies; Ontario Reign; Rockford IceHogs
- NHL draft: 36th overall, 2015; Ottawa Senators
- Playing career: 2016–2020

Gabriel Gagné (born November 11, 1996) is a Canadian former professional ice hockey winger. Gagné was drafted by the Ottawa Senators in the 2015 NHL entry draft.

== Playing career ==
Gagné was selected in the second round of the 2012 QMJHL Entry Draft by the Moncton Wildcats. In January 2013, Gagné was traded to the Victoriaville Tigres as part of a trade that sent Phillip Danault to Moncton.

After playing two-plus seasons with the Tigres, during which he scored 56 goals, Gagné was traded in December 2015 to the Shawinigan Cataractes in exchange for James Phelan and a draft pick.

Gagné was drafted in the second round, 36th overall, by the Ottawa Senators in the 2015 NHL entry draft. One year later, he made his professional debut for the Senators' ECHL affiliate, the Wichita Thunder.

In the final year of his entry-level contract in the 2018–19 season, Gagné contributed with 9 points in 33 games with AHL affiliate, the Belleville Senators, before he was traded by Ottawa to the Toronto Maple Leafs in exchange for Morgan Klimchuk on January 11, 2019.

At the conclusion of his contract with the Maple Leafs, Gagné left as a free agent. Unable to secure an NHL contract, Gagné agreed to a contract for the 2019–20 season with the Allen Americans of the ECHL on August 21, 2019. As the Americans' offensive leader, Gagné collected 26 points in 25 games before signing a professional tryout with the Ontario Reign of the AHL on December 18, 2019. He returned to the Americans after 3 games, and continued to lead the ECHL with 24 goals before agreeing to his second PTO in the AHL with the Rockford IceHogs, affiliate to the Chicago Blackhawks on January 18, 2020. Finding a role within the IceHogs, contributing with 11 points through 19 games, Gagné was signed to an AHL contract for the remainder of the season on March 7, 2020.

Following his fifth season in the AHL, with his NHL prospects limited, Gagné signed his first contract abroad, agreeing to a one-year contract with Norwegian club, Stjernen, on June 5, 2021. However, this contract would later be terminated following Gagné's sexual assault charges and subsequent arrest.

== Personal ==
Gagné has said he tries to play like Rick Nash, and he has also been compared to Steve Bernier.

=== Sexual assault charges ===
On August 3, 2021, Gagné was arrested in Québec and charged with sexual assault against multiple alleged victims. The charges date back to incidents in 2016 while he played for Shawinigan in the QMJHL, with one victim being under 16 years of age at the time. Gagné's contract with Stjernen in Norway for the upcoming season was terminated upon the news of his arrest.

On November 26, 2024, Gagné was found guilty of sexual assault by Judge Hubert Couture.

== Career statistics ==
| | | | Regular season | | | | | Playoffs |
| Season | Team | League | GP | G | A | Pts | PIM | GP | G | A | Pts | PIM |
|---|---|---|---|---|---|---|---|---|---|---|---|---|
| 2012–13 | Victoriaville Tigres | QMJHL | 1 | 0 | 0 | 0 | 0 | 1 | 0 | 0 | 0 | 0 |
| 2013–14 | Victoriaville Tigres | QMJHL | 67 | 16 | 21 | 37 | 14 | 5 | 0 | 2 | 2 | 4 |
| 2014–15 | Victoriaville Tigres | QMJHL | 67 | 35 | 24 | 59 | 39 | 4 | 2 | 1 | 3 | 4 |
| 2015–16 | Victoriaville Tigres | QMJHL | 8 | 5 | 3 | 8 | 6 | — | — | — | — | — |
| 2015–16 | Shawinigan Cataractes | QMJHL | 34 | 12 | 16 | 28 | 14 | 21 | 11 | 11 | 22 | 22 |
| 2016–17 | Binghamton Senators | AHL | 41 | 2 | 4 | 6 | 9 | — | — | — | — | — |
| 2016–17 | Wichita Thunder | ECHL | 19 | 6 | 5 | 11 | 6 | — | — | — | — | — |
| 2017–18 | Belleville Senators | AHL | 68 | 20 | 5 | 25 | 45 | — | — | — | — | — |
| 2018–19 | Belleville Senators | AHL | 33 | 4 | 5 | 9 | 8 | — | — | — | — | — |
| 2018–19 | Toronto Marlies | AHL | 22 | 2 | 5 | 7 | 6 | — | — | — | — | — |
| 2018–19 | Newfoundland Growlers | ECHL | 5 | 0 | 4 | 4 | 0 | — | — | — | — | — |
| 2019–20 | Allen Americans | ECHL | 36 | 24 | 14 | 38 | 8 | — | — | — | — | — |
| 2019–20 | Ontario Reign | AHL | 3 | 0 | 1 | 1 | 0 | — | — | — | — | — |
| 2019–20 | Rockford IceHogs | AHL | 21 | 6 | 6 | 12 | 7 | — | — | — | — | — |
| 2020–21 | Rockford IceHogs | AHL | 7 | 1 | 0 | 1 | 2 | — | — | — | — | — |
| AHL totals | | | 195 | 35 | 26 | 61 | 77 | — | — | — | — | — |
