= Laberg =

Laberg may refer to the following places in Norway:

- Laberg, Gratangen, a village in Troms
- Laberg, Salangen, Troms

== See also ==
- Laberge (disambiguation)
