= Václav Karabáček =

Czech ice hockey player (born 1996)

- Born: May 2, 1996 (age 30) Prague, Czech Republic
- Height: 6 ft 0 in (183 cm)
- Weight: 199 lb (90 kg; 14 st 3 lb)
- Position: Right wing
- Shoots: Right
- Allsv team Former teams: Västerviks IK; Rochester Americans; HC Kometa Brno; Mountfield HK; HC České Budějovice
- NHL draft: 49th overall, 2014; Buffalo Sabres
- Playing career: 2016–present

Václav Karabáček (born May 2, 1996) is a Czech professional ice hockey right wing who currently plays for Västerviks IK of the HockeyAllsvenskan (Allsv). He was drafted in the second round, 49th overall, by the Buffalo Sabres in the 2014 NHL entry draft.

== Playing career ==
He began his North American career with the Gatineau Olympiques of the QMJHL in 2013–14 season before being traded to Baie-Comeau during the 2014–15 season in exchange for Valentin Zykov. Prior to that trade, the Olympiques had made a deal with the Charlottetown Islanders to send Karabáček there in advance of the 2014 QMJHL Entry Draft; however, complications surrounding that proposal ultimately led to Karabáček staying with Gatineau.

Karabáček was also selected with the 36th pick of the 2013 KHL Junior Draft by KHL Medveščak Zagreb.

Karabáček played the first game of the 2014 NHL preseason with the Sabres before being sent back to the QMJHL. After playing one preseason game for the team in the 2015 NHL preseason as well, he was again sent back to juniors.

Karabáček was expected to represent the Czech Republic at the 2015 World Junior Ice Hockey Championships, but he was cut from the team prior to the tournament for arriving late to a team meeting.

On May 26, 2016, Karabáček marked the end of his junior career after he was signed to a three-year entry-level contract with the Buffalo Sabres. He made his professional debut in November 2016 playing for the Elmira Jackals of the ECHL. He was named a 2017 ECHL All-Star alternate after scoring 11 points in nine games with the team.

Karabáček was recalled by the Rochester Americans on December 14, 2016. He began the 2017–18 season with the Americans, but was sent down to the ECHL's Cincinnati Cyclones in November.

Karabáček scored no goals and had only five assists in 28 games with the Cyclones, and the Sabres bought out his contract on September 20, 2018.

Karabáček signed with HC Kometa Brno of the Czech Extraliga for the 2018–19 season on September 24, 2018. He went scoreless in 4 games with Brno before leaving the club for rivals Mountfield HK on October 27, 2018.

== Career statistics ==
=== Regular season and playoffs ===
			Regular season					Playoffs
Season	Team	League	GP	G	A	Pts	PIM	GP	G	A	Pts	PIM
2013–14	Gatineau Olympiques	QMJHL	65	21	26	47	40	9	6	6	12	10
2014–15	Gatineau Olympiques	QMJHL	31	11	14	25	44	—	—	—	—	—
2014–15	Baie-Comeau Drakkar	QMJHL	28	6	9	15	18	12	4	7	11	14
2015–16	Baie-Comeau Drakkar	QMJHL	23	8	8	16	30	—	—	—	—	—
2015–16	Moncton Wildcats	QMJHL	24	10	4	14	26	17	6	3	9	14
2016–17	Elmira Jackals	ECHL	9	5	6	11	10	—	—	—	—	—
2016–17	Rochester Americans	AHL	23	3	5	8	4	—	—	—	—	—
2017–18	Cincinnati Cyclones	ECHL	28	0	5	5	18	—	—	—	—	—
2017–18	Rochester Americans	AHL	1	0	0	0	0	—	—	—	—	—
2018–19	HC Kometa Brno	ELH	4	0	0	0	4	—	—	—	—	—
2018–19	Mountfield HK	ELH	5	0	0	0	2	—	—	—	—	—
2018–19	HC České Budějovice	Czech.1	27	8	12	20	86	11	5	9	14	14
2019–20	HC České Budějovice	Czech.1	48	12	24	36	34	—	—	—	—	—
2020–21	HC České Budějovice	ELH	45	7	7	14	14	—	—	—	—	—
2021–22	HC České Budějovice	ELH	50	5	8	13	10	8	0	0	0	0
2022–23	HC České Budějovice	ELH	33	0	0	0	12	—	—	—	—	—
2022–23	HC Dukla Jihlava	Czech.1	12	8	8	16	10	5	0	3	3	2
2023–24	Västerviks IK	Allsv	48	10	14	24	48	—	—	—	—	—
ELH totals			137	12	15	27	42	8	0	0	0	0

=== International ===
Year	Team	Event	Result	GP	G	A	Pts	PIM
2013	Czech Republic	IH18	3rd place, bronze medalist(s)	4	0	2	2	2
2014	Czech Republic	WJC18	2nd place, silver medalist(s)	7	3	3	6	4
Junior totals				11	3	5	8	6
