= Dmytro Timashov =

Swedish ice hockey player (born 1996)

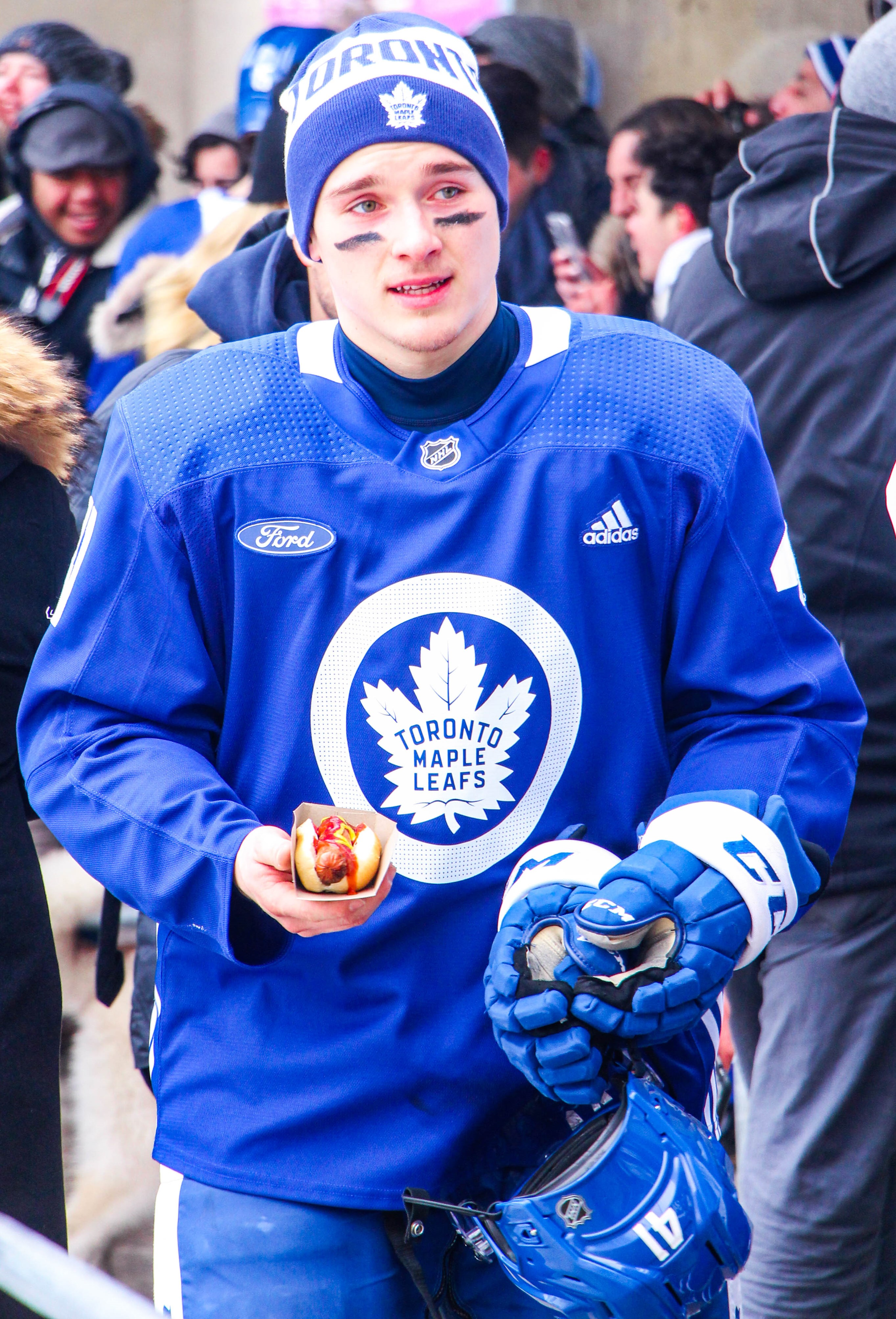
- Timashov with the Toronto Maple Leafs in 2020
- Born: 1 October 1996 (age 29) Kirovohrad, Ukraine
- Height: 5 ft 10 in (178 cm)
- Weight: 187 lb (85 kg; 13 st 5 lb)
- Position: Winger
- Shoots: Left
- Slovak team Former teams: HK Nitra; Modo Hockey; Toronto Maple Leafs; Detroit Red Wings; New York Islanders; Brynäs IF; HC Ajoie; HC Sochi; Genève-Servette HC; Admiral Vladivostok
- NHL draft: 125th overall, 2015; Toronto Maple Leafs
- Playing career: 2013–present

Dmytro "Dima" Timashov (Ukrainian: Дмитро Тимашов; born 1 October 1996) is a Ukrainian-born Swedish professional ice hockey player who is a winger for HK Nitra of the Slovak Extraliga.

== Playing career ==
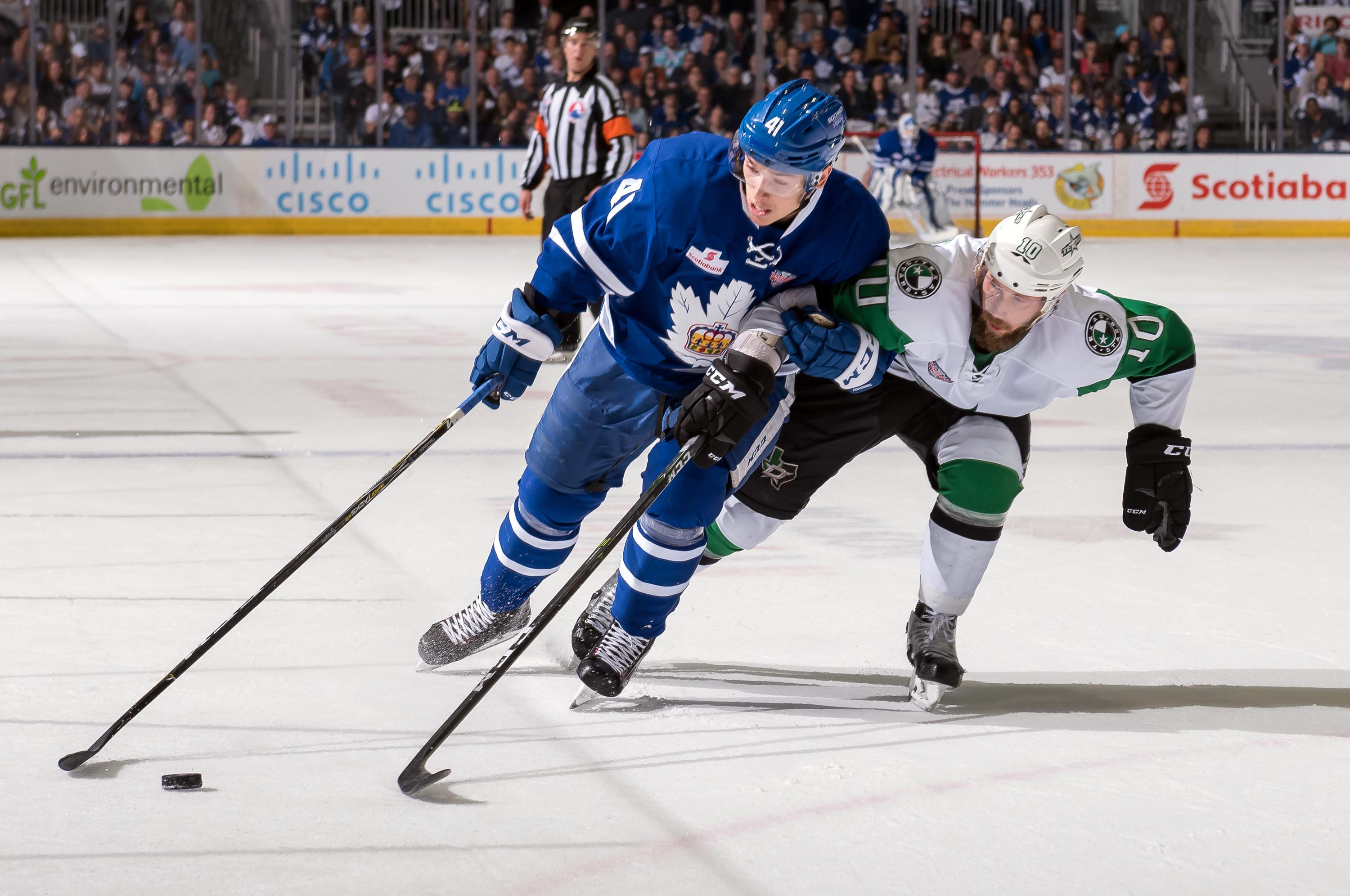
Timashov (left) with the Toronto Marlies during the 2018 Calder Cup Final

Timashov made his Swedish Hockey League (SHL) debut playing with Modo Hockey during the 2013–14 SHL season. Following this season, Timashov left Sweden to join the Quebec Remparts.

On 27 June 2015, during the 2015 NHL entry draft, Timashov was selected in the fifth round, 125th overall, by the Toronto Maple Leafs.

On 6 January 2016, Timashov was traded to the Shawinigan Cataractes. The trade came after weeks of speculation; it was previously reported Timashov would be on the move to the Moncton Wildcats, but he had refused to waive his no-movement clause to be sent to the club. The same day, rumors of a Shawinigan transaction started to appear.

Timashov joined the Toronto Maple Leafs' AHL affiliate the Toronto Marlies for the 2016–17 season and spent three years developing with the team. During the 2019–20 season, Timashov won a spot on the Maple Leafs NHL roster to start the season, and made his debut in the first game of the season against the Ottawa Senators, recording one assist. Used in a bottom-six forward role, Timashov recorded four goals and five assists in 39 games for the Maple Leafs.

On 23 February 2020, Timashov was placed on waivers by the Maple Leafs and was claimed by the Detroit Red Wings the next day. He made five appearances with the Red Wings, going scoreless, before the season was abruptly suspended and ended due to the COVID-19 pandemic.

As an unsigned restricted free agent with the Red Wings, on 11 December 2020, Timashov's rights were traded to the New York Islanders in exchange for future considerations. On 20 September 2021, Timashov was re-signed to a one-year contract by the Islanders. On 20 October, Timashov signed a two-year contract with Brynäs IF of the SHL after mutually terminating his contract with the Islanders the previous day.

On 21 October 2023, Timashov signed a two-month contract with HC Ajoie of the Swiss National League (NL).

On 4 July 2024, Timashov's KHL rights were traded from SKA St. Petersburg to HC Sochi in a multi-player trade. Immediately after, Timashov signed a one-year contract with Sochi.

On 20 December 2024, after recording just four points in 22 games, Timashov was released by Sochi. On 3 January 2025, he returned to Switzerland and played the remainder of the season with Genève-Servette HC.

On 24 July 2025, Timashov returned to the KHL, signing a one-year contract with Admiral Vladivostok.

On 8 September 2026, Timashov joined HK Nitra, the reigning champion of the Slovak Extraliga.

== International play ==
Timashov was selected to represent Sweden junior team at the 2016 World Junior Championships. Timashov excelled at the tournament, recording seven points in seven games played, and helped Sweden to a fourth-place finish.

== Personal life ==
Timashov was born in Ukraine. His parents divorced when he was one year old, and at the age of seven, he moved with his mother to Sollentuna, a suburb of Stockholm, in Sweden. His mother remarried there, and it was Timashov's stepfather who introduced him to hockey, buying him a pair of skates for his eighth birthday. Timashov speaks Swedish, Russian, English, Ukrainian and some French.

== Career statistics ==
=== Regular season and playoffs ===
			Regular season					Playoffs
Season	Team	League	GP	G	A	Pts	PIM	GP	G	A	Pts	PIM
2011–12	SDE HF	J18	17	10	13	23	37	—	—	—	—	—
2011–12	Djurgårdens IF	J18 Allsv	17	2	4	6	4	4	0	0	0	0
2012–13	Djurgårdens IF	J18	11	4	5	9	8	—	—	—	—	—
2012–13	Djurgårdens IF	J20	22	4	6	10	8	—	—	—	—	—
2012–13	Modo Hockey	J18 Allsv	2	2	1	3	0	2	0	1	1	0
2012–13	Modo Hockey	J20	16	5	7	12	4	7	0	1	1	0
2013–14	Modo Hockey	J20	40	12	29	41	18	6	0	1	1	8
2013–14	Mora IK	Allsv	6	0	1	1	2	—	—	—	—	—
2013–14	IF Björklöven	Allsv	4	0	0	0	25	—	—	—	—	—
2013–14	Modo Hockey	SHL	3	0	1	1	0	—	—	—	—	—
2013–14	Modo Hockey	J18 Allsv	—	—	—	—	—	4	2	5	7	2
2014–15	Quebec Remparts	QMJHL	66	19	71	90	54	22	3	15	18	18
2015–16	Quebec Remparts	QMJHL	29	18	35	53	51	—	—	—	—	—
2015–16	Shawinigan Cataractes	QMJHL	28	4	28	32	28	21	13	15	28	40
2016–17	Toronto Marlies	AHL	63	11	13	24	32	6	0	0	0	2
2017–18	Toronto Marlies	AHL	67	13	21	34	33	20	6	6	12	6
2018–19	Toronto Marlies	AHL	72	14	35	49	52	13	4	6	10	14
2019–20	Toronto Maple Leafs	NHL	39	4	5	9	16	—	—	—	—	—
2019–20	Detroit Red Wings	NHL	5	0	0	0	0	—	—	—	—	—
2020–21	Bridgeport Sound Tigers	AHL	22	5	6	11	26	—	—	—	—	—
2020–21	New York Islanders	NHL	1	0	0	0	0	—	—	—	—	—
2021–22	Bridgeport Islanders	AHL	1	0	0	0	0	—	—	—	—	—
2021–22	Brynäs IF	SHL	29	8	10	18	41	3	1	1	2	0
2022–23	Brynäs IF	SHL	52	10	23	33	43	—	—	—	—	—
2023–24	HC Ajoie	NL	35	9	11	20	30	—	—	—	—	—
2024–25	HC Sochi	KHL	22	1	3	4	4	—	—	—	—	—
2024–25	Genève-Servette HC	NL	22	2	7	9	8	—	—	—	—	—
2025–26	Admiral Vladivostok	KHL	42	4	9	13	26	—	—	—	—	—
SHL totals			87	18	34	52	84	3	1	1	2	0
NHL totals			45	4	5	9	16	—	—	—	—	—
KHL totals			64	5	12	17	30	—	—	—	—	—

=== International ===
Year	Team	Event	Result	GP	G	A	Pts	PIM
2013	Sweden	U17	1st place, gold medalist(s)	6	0	3	3	4
2013	Sweden	IH18	7th	4	0	4	4	2
2016	Sweden	WJC	4th	7	2	5	7	2
Junior totals				17	2	12	14	8

== Awards and honours ==
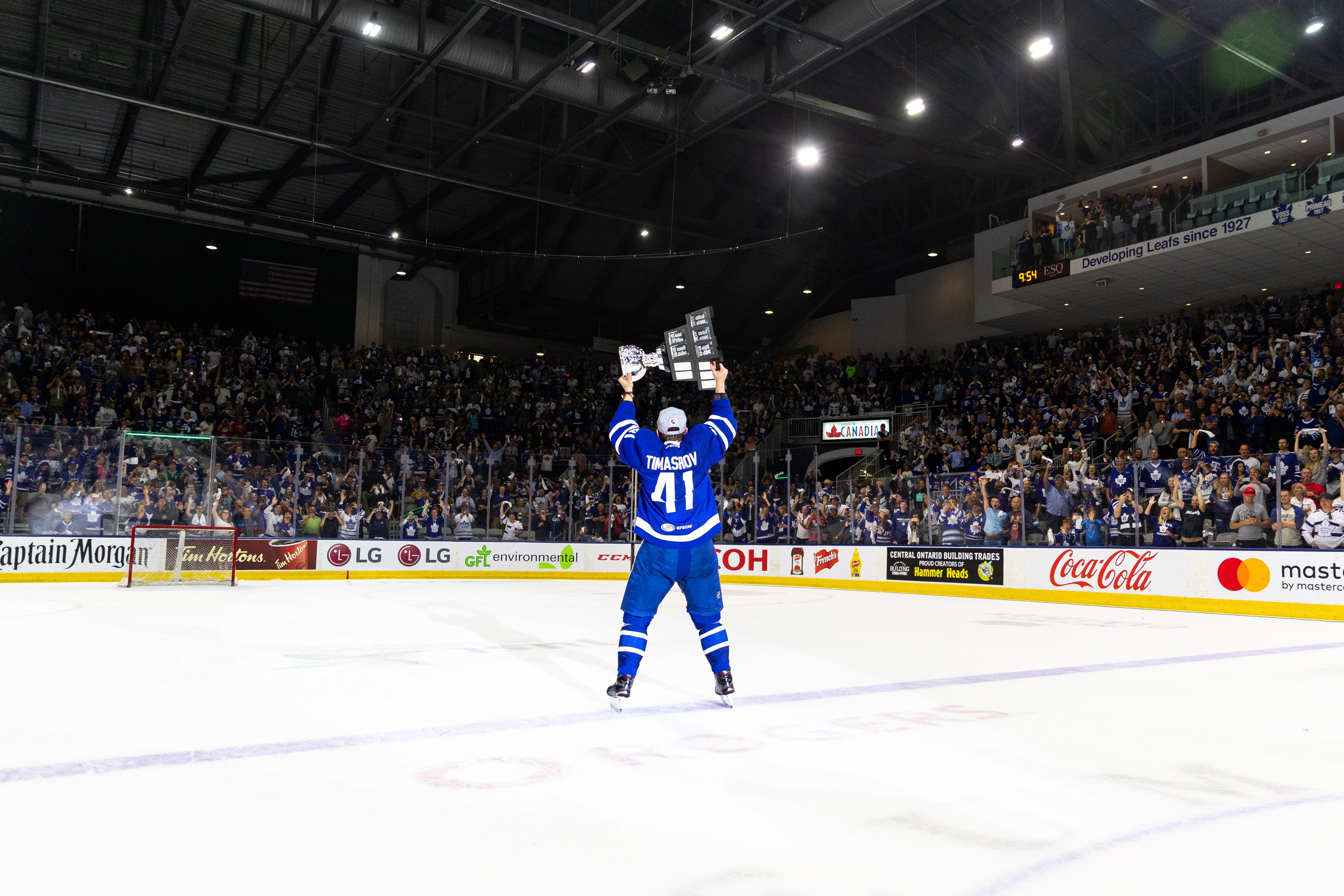
Timashov with the 2018 Calder Cup

Award	Year	Ref
QMJHL
All-Rookie Team	2015	
RDS Cup	2015	
Michel Bergeron Trophy	2015	
AHL
Calder Cup champion	2018	
