= Daniil Miromanov =

Russian ice hockey player (born 1997)

- Born: 11 July 1997 (age 29) Moscow, Russia
- Height: 6 ft 4 in (193 cm)
- Weight: 198 lb (90 kg; 14 st 2 lb)
- Position: Defence
- Shoots: Right
- KHL team Former teams: SKA Saint Petersburg; HC Sochi; HC Dynamo Pardubice; Vegas Golden Knights; Calgary Flames
- NHL draft: Undrafted
- Playing career: 2017–present

Daniil Alexandrovich Miromanov (Russian: Даниил Александрович Мироманов; born 11 July 1997) is a Russian professional ice hockey defenceman who is currently under contract with SKA Saint Petersburg of the Kontinental Hockey League (KHL).

== Playing career ==
Miromanov, as a Russian native, played junior hockey in Canada originally as a forward with the Acadie–Bathurst Titan and Moncton Wildcats of the Quebec Major Junior Hockey League (QMJHL). Moving to defence under guidance of Igor Larionov, Miromanov made his professional debut with for HC Sochi of the Kontinental Hockey League (KHL) during the 2017–18 season before returning to complete his major junior career in the QMHJL with the Wildcats.

He has also played professional with Czech club, HC Dynamo Pardubice of the Czech Extraliga (ELH) and the Manchester Monarchs in the ECHL before returning to Russia and eventually resuming his KHL career with Sochi in the 2019–20 season. Miromanov led all Sochi defenceman in scoring appearing in 58 games, collecting 10 goals and 29 points from the blueline. After completing the season, Miromanov was signed as an undrafted free agent to a one-year, entry-level contract with the Vegas Golden Knights on 16 March 2021. He joined the Golden Knights AHL affiliate, the Henderson Silver Knights, for the remainder of the season, registering two assists through five postseason games in the playoffs.

In his first training camp with the Golden Knights, Miromanov impressed before he was reassigned to the Silver Knights to begin the 2021–22 season. After collecting four points through the opening two games with the Silver Knights, Miromanov was recalled to alleviate injury concerns on the Golden Knights on 21 October 2021. He made his NHL debut with the Golden Knights on 24 October, appearing in a third-pairing role on the blueline in a 2–0 loss to the New York Islanders. He recorded his first career point in his second career game, collecting an assist in a 3–1 victory over the Colorado Avalanche on 26 October 2021.

On 6 March 2024, Miromanov was traded to the Calgary Flames as part of a deal that sent Noah Hanifin to the Golden Knights. He was immediately signed to a two-year, $2.5 million contract extension to remain with the Flames through 2026.

After six seasons in North America, Miromanov having concluded his contract with the Flames opted to return to the KHL, signing a two-year deal with SKA Saint Petersburg on 7 August 2026.

== Career statistics ==
| | | | Regular season | | | | | Playoffs |
| Season | Team | League | GP | G | A | Pts | PIM | GP | G | A | Pts | PIM |
|---|---|---|---|---|---|---|---|---|---|---|---|---|
| 2013–14 | Toronto Jr. Canadiens | GTHL | 31 | 20 | 11 | 31 | 4 | 13 | 11 | 4 | 15 | 2 |
| 2014–15 | Toronto Jr. Canadiens | GTHL | 19 | 14 | 13 | 27 | 8 | — | — | — | — | — |
| 2014–15 | Orangeville Flyers | OJHL | 1 | 0 | 0 | 0 | 0 | 1 | 0 | 0 | 0 | 0 |
| 2015–16 | Acadie-Bathurst Titan | QMJHL | 64 | 22 | 20 | 42 | 18 | 5 | 6 | 0 | 6 | 0 |
| 2016–17 | Acadie-Bathurst Titan | QMJHL | 68 | 22 | 40 | 62 | 20 | 11 | 1 | 3 | 4 | 2 |
| 2017–18 | HC Sochi | KHL | 15 | 0 | 0 | 0 | 2 | — | — | — | — | — |
| 2017–18 | Dizel Penza | VHL | 10 | 1 | 1 | 2 | 6 | — | — | — | — | — |
| 2017–18 | Moncton Wildcats | QMJHL | 38 | 8 | 24 | 32 | 12 | 12 | 1 | 9 | 10 | 6 |
| 2018–19 | HC Dynamo Pardubice | ELH | 16 | 1 | 3 | 4 | 8 | — | — | — | — | — |
| 2018–19 | LHK Jestřábi Prostějov | Czech.1 | 1 | 0 | 1 | 1 | 0 | — | — | — | — | — |
| 2018–19 | Manchester Monarchs | ECHL | 49 | 13 | 27 | 40 | 26 | 11 | 2 | 2 | 4 | 4 |
| 2019–20 | SKA-Neva | VHL | 43 | 9 | 13 | 22 | 20 | 9 | 0 | 3 | 3 | 2 |
| 2020–21 | HC Sochi | KHL | 58 | 10 | 19 | 29 | 16 | — | — | — | — | — |
| 2020–21 | Henderson Silver Knights | AHL | 6 | 0 | 0 | 0 | 2 | 5 | 0 | 2 | 2 | 0 |
| 2021–22 | Henderson Silver Knights | AHL | 53 | 11 | 29 | 40 | 30 | — | — | — | — | — |
| 2021–22 | Vegas Golden Knights | NHL | 11 | 0 | 1 | 1 | 2 | — | — | — | — | — |
| 2022–23 | Henderson Silver Knights | AHL | 31 | 9 | 13 | 22 | 10 | — | — | — | — | — |
| 2022–23 | Vegas Golden Knights | NHL | 14 | 2 | 4 | 6 | 2 | — | — | — | — | — |
| 2023–24 | Henderson Silver Knights | AHL | 5 | 1 | 5 | 6 | 0 | — | — | — | — | — |
| 2023–24 | Vegas Golden Knights | NHL | 4 | 0 | 0 | 0 | 0 | — | — | — | — | — |
| 2023–24 | Calgary Flames | NHL | 20 | 3 | 4 | 7 | 8 | — | — | — | — | — |
| 2024–25 | Calgary Flames | NHL | 44 | 2 | 7 | 9 | 12 | — | — | — | — | — |
| 2025–26 | Calgary Flames | NHL | 1 | 0 | 0 | 0 | 0 | — | — | — | — | — |
| 2025–26 | Calgary Wranglers | AHL | 66 | 11 | 27 | 38 | 26 | — | — | — | — | — |
| KHL totals | | | 73 | 10 | 19 | 29 | 18 | — | — | — | — | — |
| ELH totals | | | 16 | 1 | 3 | 4 | 8 | — | — | — | — | — |
| NHL totals | | | 94 | 7 | 16 | 23 | 24 | — | — | — | — | — |
