= Mason McDonald =

Canadian ice hockey player (born 1996)

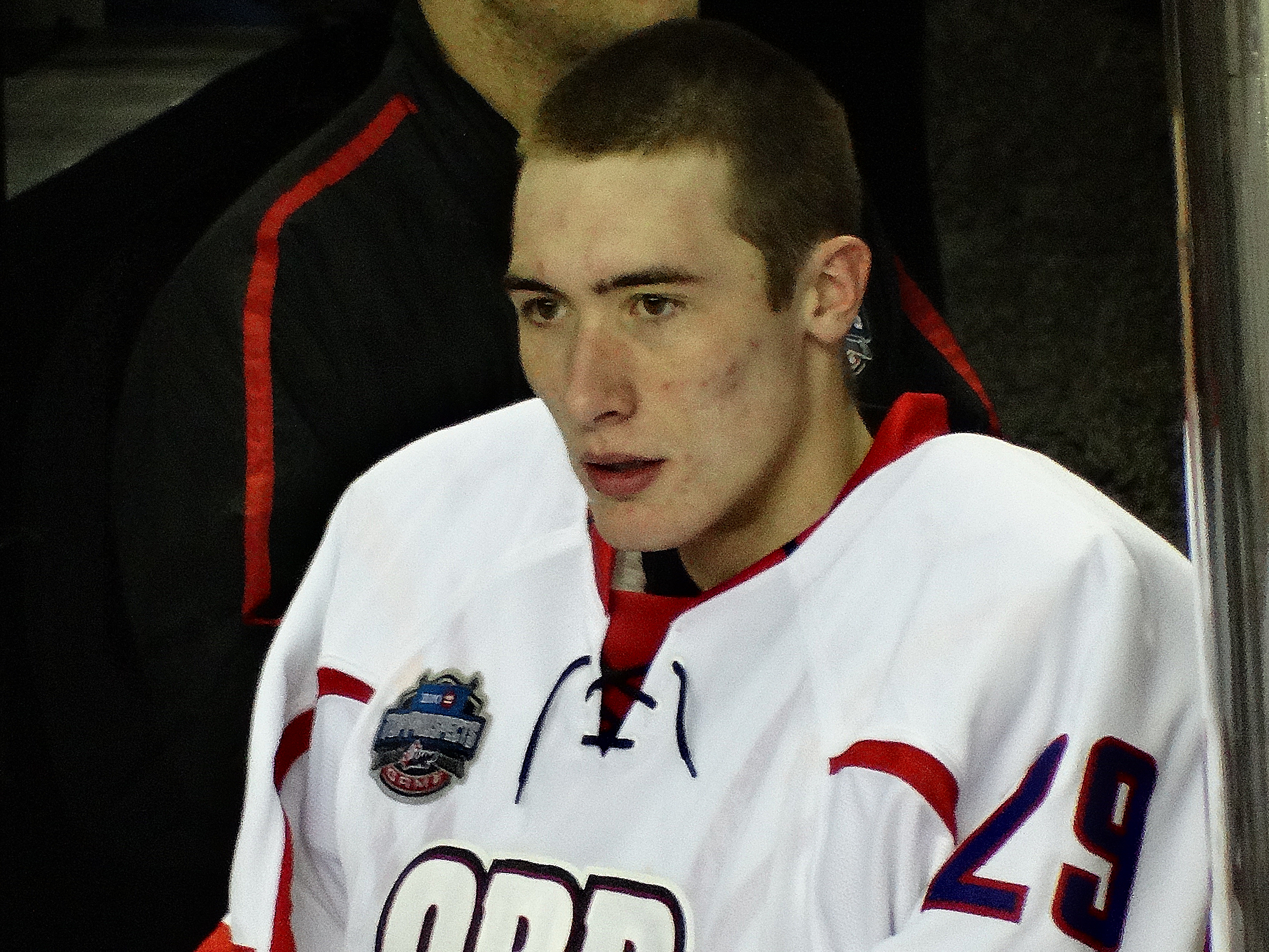
- McDonald in 2014
- Born: April 23, 1996 (age 30) Halifax, Nova Scotia, Canada
- Height: 6 ft 4 in (193 cm)
- Weight: 200 lb (91 kg; 14 st 4 lb)
- Position: Goaltender
- Caught: Right
- Played for: Stockton Heat
- NHL draft: 34th overall, 2014; Calgary Flames
- Playing career: 2016–2022

Mason McDonald (born April 23, 1996) is a former Canadian professional ice hockey player who played as a goaltender. He last played for the Tulsa Oilers of the ECHL in 2021–22. He was selected by the Calgary Flames, 34th overall, in the 2014 NHL entry draft.

== Playing career ==
Previously, he was selected 20th overall in the Quebec Major Junior Hockey League Entry Draft for 2012 to play for Acadie–Bathurst Titan. In the midst of his second season with the Titans in 2013–14, McDonald was traded to the Charlottetown Islanders on December 28, 2013.

After his first two seasons in the QMJHL, McDonald was the first goalie drafted, in the 2014 NHL entry draft, 34th overall by the Calgary Flames. On July 2, 2015, McDonald was signed to a three-year entry-level contract with the Calgary Flames.

At the conclusion of his entry-level contract with the Flames, having been unable to make progression within the organization, McDonald was released as a free agent after he was not tendered a qualifying offer on June 25, 2019. Unable to secure another NHL contract, McDonald agreed to a one-year AHL deal with the Colorado Eagles, affiliate to the Colorado Avalanche on July 25, 2019. He did not feature during his contract with the Eagles, assigned exclusively to play in the ECHL with affiliate, the Utah Grizzlies.

== International play ==
McDonald was one of three goaltenders who represented Canada at the 2016 World Junior Hockey Championships.

== Career statistics ==
=== Regular season and playoffs ===
			Regular season									Playoffs
Season	Team	League	GP	W	L	T/OT	MIN	GA	SO	GAA	SV%	GP	W	L	MIN	GA	SO	GAA	SV%
2012–13	Acadie-Bathurst Titan	QMJHL	26	6	8	3	1004	79	1	4.72	.885	1	0	0	20	3	0	3.00	.917
2013–14	Acadie-Bathurst Titan	QMJHL	13	3	7	1	655	39	0	3.57	.887	—	—	—	—	—	—	—	—
2013–14	Charlottetown Islanders	QMJHL	16	5	8	2	948	53	0	3.35	.907	4	0	4	201	22	0	6.58	.860
2014–15	Charlottetown Islanders	QMJHL	56	28	22	4	3194	163	1	3.06	.906	3	1	1	121	8	0	3.98	.879
2015–16	Charlottetown Islanders	QMJHL	39	21	15	3	2307	128	3	3.33	.902	12	6	5	736	45	0	3.67	.900
2016–17	Adirondack Thunder	ECHL	29	13	9	2	1678	76	1	2.72	.897	—	—	—	—	—	—	—	—
2016–17	Stockton Heat	AHL	1	0	0	1	63	6	0	5.75	.818	—	—	—	—	—	—	—	—
2017–18	Kansas City Mavericks	ECHL	27	11	14	1	1538	81	0	3.16	.894	—	—	—	—	—	—	—	—
2017–18	Stockton Heat	AHL	4	3	1	0	224	13	0	3.48	.875	—	—	—	—	—	—	—	—
2018–19	Kansas City Mavericks	ECHL	36	23	10	3	2174	92	4	2.54	.917	7	3	4	426	25	0	3.52	.901
2019–20	Utah Grizzlies	ECHL	17	7	5	4	1015	47	0	2.78	.890	—	—	—	—	—	—	—	—
2021–22	Tulsa Oilers	ECHL	3	0	2	0	154	11	0	4.29	.851	—	—	—	—	—	—	—	—
AHL totals			5	3	1	1	287	19	0	3.97	.861	—	—	—	—	—	—	—	—

=== International ===
Year	Team	Event	Result	GP	W	L	T	MIN	GA	SO	GAA	SV%
2014	Canada	WJC18	3rd place, bronze medalist(s)	6	4	2	0	371	12	0	1.94	.930
2016	Canada	WJC	6th	2	1	1	0	119	5	0	2.52	.861
Junior totals				8	5	3	0	490	17	0	2.23	.896
