= Brandon Gignac =

Canadian ice hockey player (born 1997)

- Born: November 7, 1997 (age 28) Repentigny, Quebec, Canada
- Height: 5 ft 11 in (180 cm)
- Weight: 195 lb (88 kg; 13 st 13 lb)
- Position: Centre
- Shoots: Left
- NL team Former teams: EHC Kloten; New Jersey Devils; Montreal Canadiens
- NHL draft: 80th overall, 2016; New Jersey Devils
- Playing career: 2017–present

Brandon Gignac (born November 7, 1997) is a Canadian professional ice hockey centre for EHC Kloten of the National League (NL). He was selected in the third round, 80th overall, by the New Jersey Devils in the 2016 NHL entry draft. Gignac has also previously played for the Montreal Canadiens.

== Playing career ==
Gignac played major junior hockey with the Shawinigan Cataractes of the Quebec Major Junior Hockey League (QMJHL) before he was selected by the New Jersey Devils of the National Hockey League (NHL) in the third round, 80th overall in the 2016 NHL entry draft. During his final season with the Cataractes in the 2016–17 season, on November 12, 2016, he signed a three-year, entry-level contract with the Devils. That spring, he joined the Devils' American Hockey League (AHL) affiliate, the Albany Devils, on an amateur tryout (ATO) basis following a first round defeat in the QMJHL playoffs. Gignac made his professional debut in Albany's penultimate regular season game against the Rochester Americans in a 5–4 defeat on April 14, 2017.

In his first professional season, Gignac was assigned by New Jersey to their new AHL affiliate, the Binghamton Devils, for their inaugural season in 2017–18 season. In his first two months, he contributed with just two goals and one assist, while also developing his two-way game before suffering a season-ending knee injury, tearing both his ACL and MCL, on December 13, 2017. Before the 2018–19 season, Gignac participated in the Devils' training camp. On March 9, 2019, Gignac received his first call-up to the NHL by the Devils and made his NHL debut, taking one shot and skating for 9:04 minutes as the Devils lost 4–2 to the New York Rangers.

In his final year with the Devils organization, he played in the ECHL with the Jacksonville Icemen. Gignac was a restricted free agent at the end of the 2020–21 season. He was left unprotected in the Seattle Kraken expansion draft but ultimately went unselected. Gignac was not given a qualifying offer by the Devils and became an unrestricted free agent.

On July 29, 2021, Gignac signed a one-year contract with the Laval Rocket of the AHL. After registering 10 goals and 26 points in 48 games with the Rocket during the 2021–22 season, he signed a two-year extension with Laval on July 9, 2022.

During the 2023–24 season, while leading the Rocket in scoring with 42 points through 43 regular season games, Gignac secured a two-year, two-way contract with the Montreal Canadiens on February 4, 2024. He was recalled by Montreal the same day and made his debut for the Canadiens in a 5–2 win over the Washington Capitals on February 7. On February 13, Gignac scored his first career NHL goal in a 5–0 shutout victory versus the Anaheim Ducks.

After clearing waivers to begin the 2024–25 season, Gignac was named an alternate captain of the Rocket on October 11, 2024.

In June 2025, Gignac signed his first contract overseas, agreeing to a two-year contract with EHC Kloten of the Swiss-based National League (NL).

== International play ==
Internationally, Gignac represented Hockey Canada as part of team Canada Quebec at the 2014 World U-17 Hockey Challenge, where his team ultimately finished in fourth place following a loss to Russia in the bronze medal game.

== Career statistics ==
=== Regular season and playoffs ===
			Regular season					Playoffs
Season	Team	League	GP	G	A	Pts	PIM	GP	G	A	Pts	PIM
2012–13	Collège Esther-Blondin Phénix	QMAAA	42	20	17	37	46	3	0	1	1	4
2013–14	Shawinigan Cataractes	QMJHL	53	5	9	14	18	4	0	1	1	6
2014–15	Shawinigan Cataractes	QMJHL	63	9	31	40	18	7	2	1	3	4
2015–16	Shawinigan Cataractes	QMJHL	67	24	37	61	41	20	7	9	16	8
2016–17	Shawinigan Cataractes	QMJHL	59	23	39	62	30	6	0	4	4	2
2016–17	Albany Devils	AHL	2	0	0	0	2	—	—	—	—	—
2017–18	Binghamton Devils	AHL	21	2	1	3	4	—	—	—	—	—
2018–19	Binghamton Devils	AHL	66	12	24	36	28	—	—	—	—	—
2018–19	New Jersey Devils	NHL	1	0	0	0	0	—	—	—	—	—
2019–20	Binghamton Devils	AHL	36	4	10	14	19	—	—	—	—	—
2020–21	Binghamton Devils	AHL	2	0	0	0	2	—	—	—	—	—
2020–21	Jacksonville Icemen	ECHL	35	10	17	27	6	—	—	—	—	—
2021–22	Laval Rocket	AHL	48	10	16	26	12	13	5	4	9	6
2022–23	Laval Rocket	AHL	49	13	20	33	14	2	0	1	1	0
2023–24	Laval Rocket	AHL	61	19	36	55	46	—	—	—	—	—
2023–24	Montreal Canadiens	NHL	7	1	0	1	0	—	—	—	—	—
2024–25	Laval Rocket	AHL	15	2	4	6	11	12	1	2	3	0
NHL totals			8	1	0	1	0	—	—	—	—	—

=== International ===
Year	Team	Event	Result	GP	G	A	Pts	PIM
2014	Canada Quebec	U17	4th	6	1	0	1	4
Junior totals				6	1	0	1	4

== Awards and honours ==
Award	Year	Ref
CHL
CHL Canada/Russia Series	2016	
