= Samuel Laberge =

Canadian ice hockey player (born 1997)

- Born: April 10, 1997 (age 29) Châteauguay, Quebec, Canada
- Height: 6 ft 2 in (188 cm)
- Weight: 205 lb (93 kg; 14 st 9 lb)
- Position: Forward
- Shoots: Left
- NHL team Former teams: Free agent New Jersey Devils
- NHL draft: Undrafted
- Playing career: 2017–present

Samuel Laberge (born April 10, 1997) is a Canadian professional ice hockey forward who is currently an unrestricted free agent. He most recently played with the San Jose Barracuda of the American Hockey League while under contract to the San Jose Sharks of the National Hockey League (NHL). Undrafted, Laberge had played in the ECHL and Ligue Nord-Américaine de Hockey (LNAH) before making his NHL debut.

== Playing career ==
=== Junior ===
Prior to playing major junior, Laberge played youth hockey for the Chateâuguay Grenadiers. Cut from the under-18 AAA team in his first year of eligibility, he played at the Midget Espoir level and was drafted by the Rimouski Océanic of the Quebec Major Junior Hockey League (QMJHL) at the conclusion of the season. He won the Jimmy Ferrari Cup with Chateâuguay as Quebec AAA champions in 2014.

During a brief stint with the Océanic in the 2013–14 season, Laberge scored his first QMJHL goal against the Baie-Comeau Drakkar on September 14, 2013.

In his rookie season in 2014–15, Laberge and the Océanic won the President's Cup as QMJHL champions. Although he went undrafted at the 2015 NHL entry draft, he received invites to multiple NHL teams' summer development camps, attending that of the Los Angeles Kings.

Laberge was named QMJHL Humanitarian of the Year for the 2015–16 and 2016–17 seasons, serving as Rimouski's alternate captain in the former and captain in the latter.

=== Professional ===
==== Professional debuts ====
Laberge began his professional career by signing with the Texas Stars of the American Hockey League (AHL) on July 12, 2017. He scored his first AHL goal on November 25, 2017, the game-winning tally in a 3–2 victory over the Cleveland Monsters. During the 2018 Calder Cup playoffs, in game three of the first round series against the Ontario Reign, Laberge scored his first AHL playoff goal, a double-overtime game-winner.

On July 12, 2018, Laberge signed a one-year contract to return to the Stars for the 2018–19 season. After the season, during which he missed more than two months due to injury, he went home to recover from a concussion and prepare for the next year.

==== Departure to Quebec ====
While on his way to 2019 training camp for the AHL's Manitoba Moose, where he was signed to a professional tryout (PTO) contract, Laberge learned that his father, Pierre, had been diagnosed with bone cancer. After only three days in Manitoba, he left camp to be home with his father.

Upon his arrival to his hometown of Châteauguay, where he found a job in construction, Laberge received contract offers from more than half of the seven teams in the semi-professional Ligue Nord-Américaine de Hockey (LNAH). He chose to sign with the Sorel-Tracy Éperviers, as they were the closest team to Châteauguay. He later recalled that, although it was a difficult time and he worried that he would not be able to return to high-level professional play, his "passion for hockey came back, 100 percent."

He would finish the season as Sorel-Tracy's top scorer, with 29 points in 33 games. The league's playoffs were not held, due to the coronavirus pandemic.

==== Return to professional hockey ====
Entering the 2020–21 season, Laberge signed a standard player contract with the Adirondack Thunder of the ECHL. When the Thunder and the rest of the ECHL's North Division announced that they would not return to play due to the COVID-19 pandemic, Laberge became a free agent, and signed with the Allen Americans.

Laberge signed a one-year, two-way AHL contract with the Utica Comets on July 21, 2021. Assigned to the Thunder and named their alternate captain, he was recalled to Utica just five games into the season. After being moved up and down between the two teams for much of the season, he was informed in February 2022 that he would be staying with the Comets more permanently.

One June 21, 2022, Utica re-signed Laberge to a one-year contract. Laberge played in his first NHL preseason game on September 26, 2022, against the Montreal Canadiens in his home province of Quebec. His father was in attendance. In the preliminary round of the 2023 Calder Cup playoffs, Laberge scored the series-winning goal in overtime of game 2 against the Laval Rocket, fighting off a defender in front to deflect a shot by Šimon Nemec.

Laberge returned to the Comets for the 2023–24 season, signing a one-year contract on May 23, 2023. On November 18, in his second game after missing three weeks with an injury, he recorded a Gordie Howe hat trick with a goal, assist, and fight in a 6–3 victory over Laval.

Midway through the season, on November 25, Laberge signed a one-year, entry-level contract with the New Jersey Devils, the NHL affiliate of the Comets and Thunder. He made his NHL debut on November 30, in a 4–3 victory over the Philadelphia Flyers, becoming the 743rd former ECHL player to play in the NHL and the third that season. Laberge was returned to the Comets after two games, between which he totaled just over six minutes of time on ice. In 59 AHL games, he recorded six goals, 19 points, and 92 penalty minutes.

On May 16, 2024, the Devils re-signed Laberge to a one-year, two-way contract with a $775,000 cap hit.

As a free agent from the Devils, on July 1, 2025, Laberge signed a one-year, two-way contract with San Jose Sharks for the 2025–26 season.

== Career statistics ==
=== Regular season and playoffs ===
			Regular season					Playoffs
Season	Team	League	GP	G	A	Pts	PIM	GP	G	A	Pts	PIM
2013–14	Rimouski Océanic	QMJHL	2	1	0	1	0	—	—	—	—	—
2014–15	Rimouski Océanic	QMJHL	61	15	11	26	68	15	3	2	5	10
2015–16	Rimouski Océanic	QMJHL	63	21	27	48	103	6	1	1	2	20
2016–17	Rimouski Océanic	QMJHL	40	18	27	45	33	4	1	0	1	7
2017–18	Texas Stars	AHL	66	7	8	15	81	13	1	2	3	4
2017–18	Idaho Steelheads	ECHL	2	0	0	0	2	—	—	—	—	—
2018–19	Texas Stars	AHL	31	1	6	7	70	—	—	—	—	—
2019–20	Sorel-Tracy Éperviers	LNAH	33	16	13	29	22	—	—	—	—	—
2020–21	Allen Americans	ECHL	50	15	22	37	73	5	2	3	5	8
2021–22	Utica Comets	AHL	53	5	8	13	58	5	0	0	0	0
2021–22	Adirondack Thunder	ECHL	12	2	8	10	24	—	—	—	—	—
2022–23	Utica Comets	AHL	43	8	8	16	49	4	1	1	2	0
2023–24	Utica Comets	AHL	59	6	13	19	92	—	—	—	—	—
2023–24	New Jersey Devils	NHL	2	0	0	0	0	—	—	—	—	—
2024–25	Utica Comets	AHL	38	3	1	4	76	—	—	—	—	—
2025–26	San Jose Barracuda	AHL	9	0	1	1	27	—	—	—	—	—
NHL totals			2	0	0	0	0	—	—	—	—	—

=== International ===
Year	Team	Event	Result	GP	G	A	Pts	PIM
2014	Canada Quebec	U17	4th	6	0	1	1	2
Junior totals				6	0	1	1	2

== Awards and honours ==
Award	Year	Ref
QMJHL
Humanitarian of the Year	2016, 2017	
