= Francis Perron =

Canadian ice hockey player

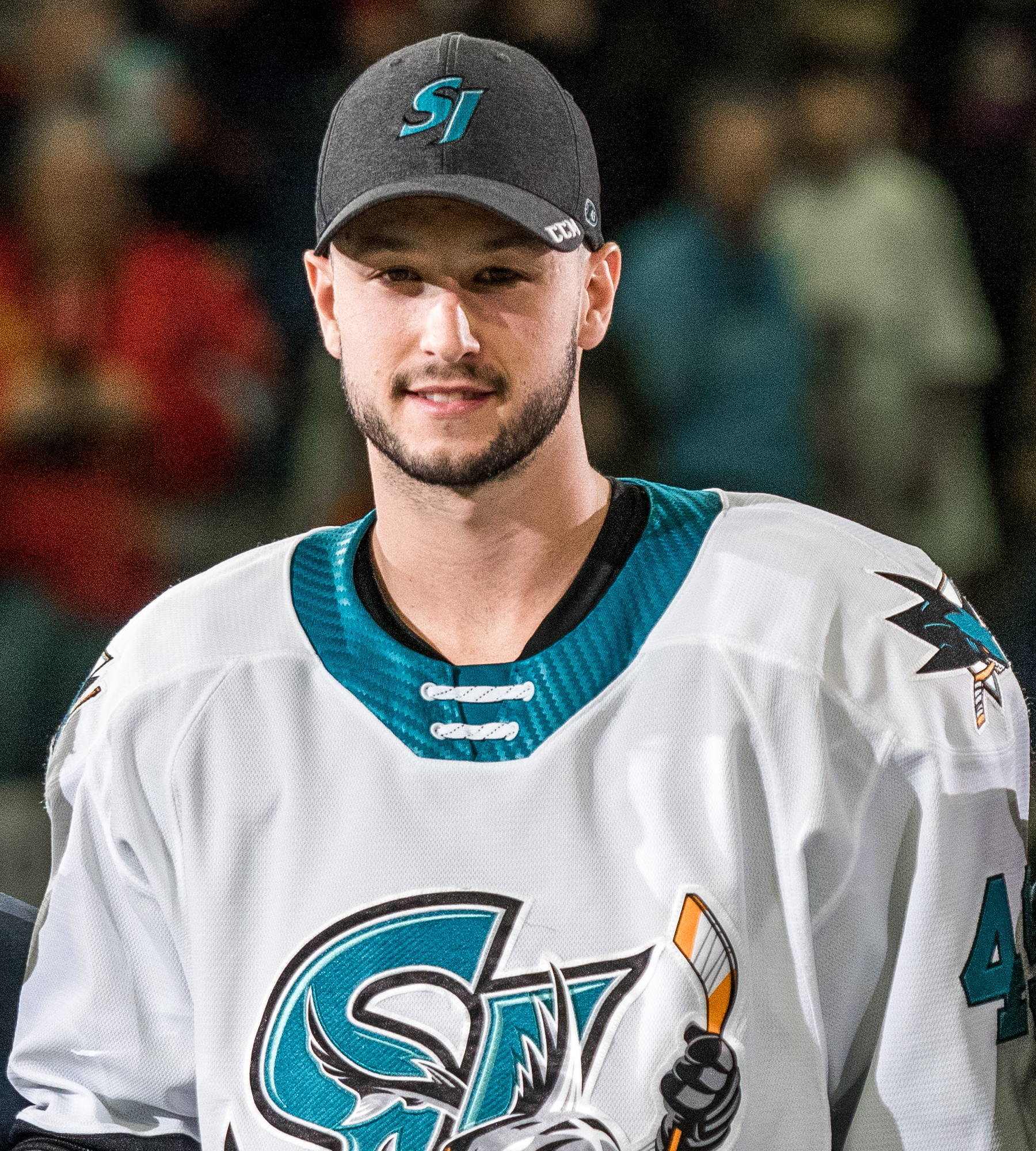
- Perron with the San Jose Barracuda in 2019
- Born: April 18, 1996 (age 30) Laval, Quebec, Canada
- Height: 6 ft 0 in (183 cm)
- Weight: 166 lb (75 kg; 11 st 12 lb)
- Position: Left wing
- Shot: Left
- Played for: Binghamton Senators; Belleville Senators; San Jose Barracuda; Utica Comets; IF Björklöven; HC Sierre; Dragons de Rouen
- NHL draft: 190th overall, 2014; Ottawa Senators
- Playing career: 2016–2025

Francis Perron (born April 18, 1996) is a Canadian former professional ice hockey player. He most recently played for Dragons de Rouen in the Ligue Magnus (FRA). Perron was selected by the Ottawa Senators in the seventh round, 190th overall, in the 2014 NHL entry draft.

== Playing career ==
Perron played major junior hockey with the Rouyn-Noranda Huskies of the Quebec Major Junior Hockey League. In his final junior season in 2015–16, Perron led the Huskies as team captain with 41 goals and 108 points in just 62 regular-season games. He was signed before the playoffs to a three-year entry-level contract with his draft club, the Ottawa Senators, on March 15, 2016.

He continued his scoring dominance in the post-season, helping the Huskies claim the QMJHL championship with 33 points in 18 contests to earn the Guy Lafleur Trophy as playoff MVP and the Michel Brière Memorial Trophy as the league's MVP. In completing his junior career as runners-up in the 2016 Memorial Cup, Perron placed third in all-time scoring for the Rouyn-Noranda Huskies with 257 points, behind Jerome Tremblay and Mike Ribeiro.

On September 13, 2018, Perron was included in the blockbuster trade that saw himself and Erik Karlsson shipped off to the San Jose Sharks. In the 2018–19 season, Perron was assigned by the Sharks to the AHL, joining the San Jose Barracuda. He recorded a career-high in all offensive categories, posting 18 goals, 29 assists for 47 points in 63 games for the Barracuda.

At the 2019 NHL entry draft, on June 22, 2019, Perron was traded along with a seventh-round pick to the Vancouver Canucks in exchange for a sixth-round selection and the rights to Tom Pyatt. On July 8, 2019, Perron signed a one-year, two-way contract with the Canucks for the 2019–20 season.

When the 2020–21 NHL season began on January 13, 2021, Perron was without a contract. One week later, on January 20, 2021, he signed a one-year contract with IF Björklöven of the HockeyAllsvenskan league. On June 3, 2021, Perron signed a one-year extension with IF Björklöven.

After two seasons with IF Björklöven, Perron played one season for HC Sierre in Switzerland and completed his career playing two seasons with Dragons de Rouen.

== Career statistics ==
=== Regular season and playoffs ===
			Regular season					Playoffs
Season	Team	League	GP	G	A	Pts	PIM	GP	G	A	Pts	PIM
2011–12	Saint-Eustache Vikings	QMAAA	14	5	13	18	14	—	—	—	—	—
2012–13	Rouyn-Noranda Huskies	QMJHL	57	7	11	18	28	5	1	1	2	7
2013–14	Rouyn-Noranda Huskies	QMJHL	68	16	39	55	32	9	1	7	8	4
2014–15	Rouyn-Noranda Huskies	QMJHL	64	29	47	76	39	6	3	4	7	14
2015–16	Rouyn-Noranda Huskies	QMJHL	62	41	67	108	38	18	12	21	33	11
2016–17	Binghamton Senators	AHL	68	6	20	26	14	—	—	—	—	—
2017–18	Belleville Senators	AHL	44	4	11	15	26	—	—	—	—	—
2018–19	San Jose Barracuda	AHL	63	18	29	47	26	3	0	1	1	2
2019–20	Utica Comets	AHL	42	6	12	18	24	—	—	—	—	—
2020–21	IF Björklöven	Allsv	16	4	6	10	6	14	4	4	8	4
2021–22	IF Björklöven	Allsv	29	10	6	16	15	18	2	9	11	2
2022–23	HC Sierre	SL	33	16	15	31	14	4	2	1	3	4
2023–24	Dragons de Rouen	FRA	35	13	27	40	8	15	7	13	20	4
AHL totals			217	34	72	106	90	3	0	1	1	2

=== International ===
Year	Team	Event	Result	GP	G	A	Pts	PIM
2013	Canada Quebec	U17	4th	6	1	2	3	2
Junior totals				6	1	2	3	2

== Awards and honors ==
Award	Year
QMJHL
First All-Star Team	2016
Michel Brière Memorial Trophy	2016
Guy Lafleur Trophy	2016
Memorial Cup Most Sportsmanlike Player	2016
AHL
All-Star Game	2019
