= Aréna Glencore =

Arena in Rouyn-Noranda, Quebec, Canada

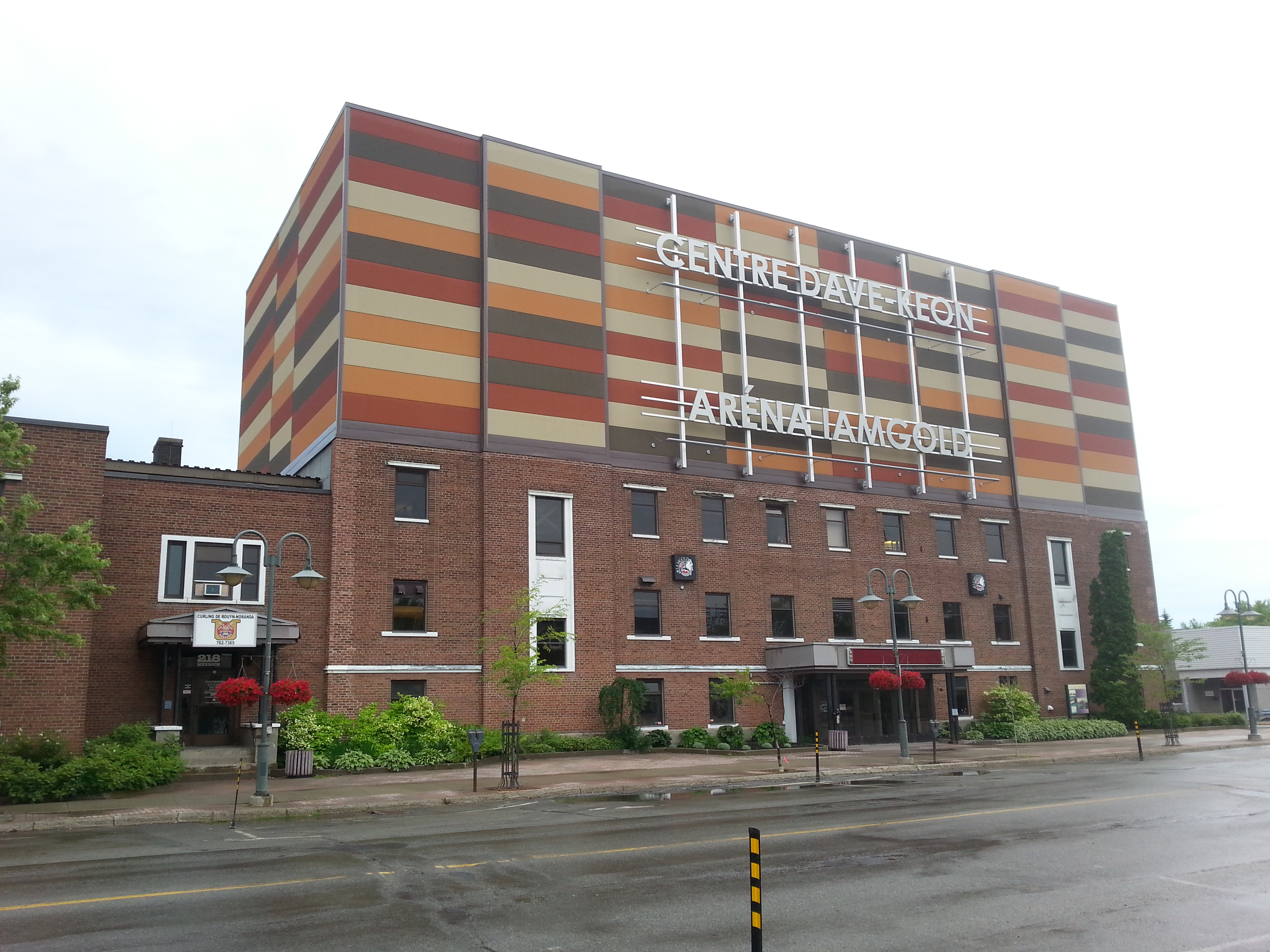
- Aréna Glencore in July 2016

- Location within Quebec Location within Canada
- Location: 218 Murdoch Ave Rouyn-Noranda, Quebec J9X 1E6, Canada
- Coordinates: 48.2467113°N 79.0189075°W
- Capacity: 3,200

Construction
- Built: 1951

Tenant
- Rouyn-Noranda Huskies (QMJHL)

The Aréna Glencore (previously known as the Aréna Iamgold and the Aréna Dave-Keon) is a 2,150-seat (total capacity 3,200) multi-purpose arena in Rouyn-Noranda, Quebec, Canada. It was built in 1951. It is home to the Rouyn-Noranda Huskies ice hockey team. Formerly named in honour of Dave Keon, a member of the Hockey Hall of Fame and a native of the city, Toronto-based international gold producer Iamgold would later buy the naming rights.

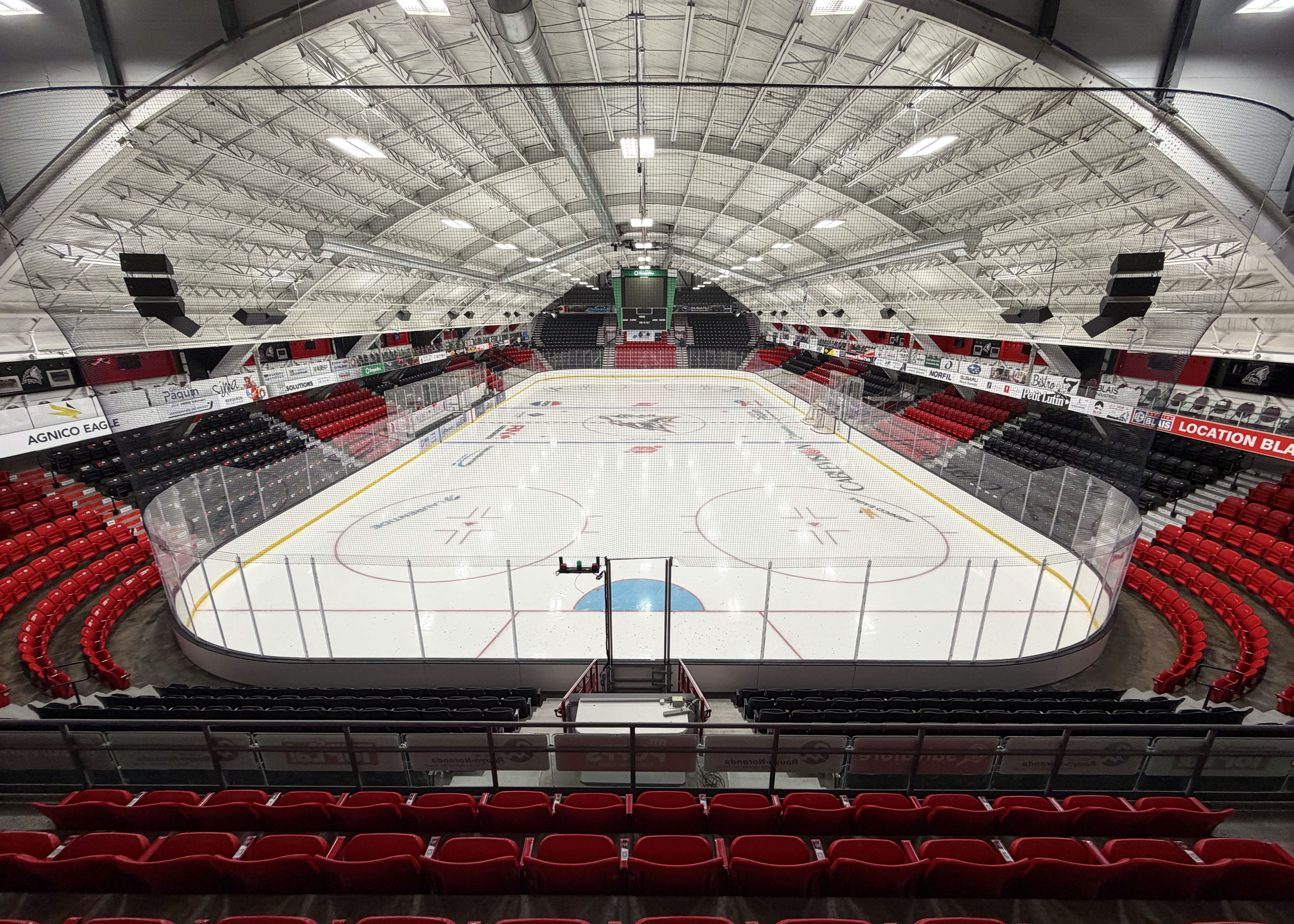
Interior

== Past events ==
In the past, the arena has hosted:

- 2008 - President's Cup (QMJHL) Final Vs Gatineau Olympiques
- 2016 - President's Cup (QMJHL) Final Vs Shawinigan Cataractes
- 2019 - President's Cup (QMJHL) Final Vs Halifax Mooseheads
