= Martine LaBerge =

Canadian-American bioengineer

Martine LaBerge is a Canadian-American bioengineer whose research interests include knee implants, stents, implant materials and tribology, and the behavior of the muscles that line blood vessels. She is a professor in the Department of Bioengineering at Clemson University.

== Education and career ==
LaBerge has a Ph.D. in biomedical engineering from the Université du Québec à Montréal, advised by Gilbert Drouin, and was a postdoctoral researcher at the University of Waterloo.

She moved to the US to become an assistant professor at Clemson University in 1990. She became department chair in 2002, and served as chair for 20 years. In 2013, she was acting dean of engineering. Her work as chair involved the development of new industry collaborations, hiring most of the faculty members in her department, and helping to found the Clemson University Biomedical Engineering Innovation Campus.

She served as the president of the Society for Biomaterials for the 2007–2008 term.

== Recognition ==
LaBerge was elected as a fellow of the American Institute for Medical and Biological Engineering in 2006. She received the South Carolina Governor’s Award for Scientific Awareness in 2009, the inaugural Award For Service of the Society for Biomaterials in 2012, and the Southeastern Medical Device Association Spotlight Award in 2018.

She was elected as a fellow of the Biomedical Engineering Society in 2018, and received the Herbert Voigt Distinguished Service Award of the Biomedical Engineering Society in 2019. She received the InnoVision Dr. Charles Townes Individual Lifetime Achievement Award in 2021, was named to the South Carolina Life Sciences Hall of Fame in 2022, and received the Society for Biomaterials Founders Award in 2026.

In 2021, Clemson University gave her its inaugural Gender Equity Champion Award.
