= Alexandre Carrier =

Canadian ice hockey player (born 1996)

- Born: October 8, 1996 (age 30) Quebec City, Quebec, Canada
- Height: 5 ft 11 in (180 cm)
- Weight: 174 lb (79 kg; 12 st 6 lb)
- Position: Defence
- Shoots: Right
- NHL team Former teams: Montreal Canadiens; Nashville Predators
- NHL draft: 115th overall, 2015; Nashville Predators
- Playing career: 2016–present

Alexandre Carrier (born October 8, 1996) is a Canadian professional ice hockey player who is a defenceman for the Montreal Canadiens of the National Hockey League (NHL). He was selected in the fourth round, 115th overall, by the Nashville Predators in the 2015 NHL entry draft.

== Early life ==
Carrier was born on October 8, 1996 in Quebec City, but raised in Saint-Hyacinthe, as part of a hockey family. His father, Bernard, played briefly for the Drummondville Voltigeurs, while his older brother, Samuel, was a 2010 NHL entry draft selection by the Washington Capitals.

== Playing career ==
=== Junior ===
Carrier first played midget level hockey in his native Quebec with the Collège Antoine-Girouard Gaulois of the Ligue de hockey Midget AAA du Québec (QMAAA). He then embarked on a major junior career with the Gatineau Olympiques of the Quebec Major Junior Hockey League (QMJHL) after being selected fourth overall by the team in the 2012 QMJHL entry draft. A mobile, two-way defenceman, Carrier posted a breakout campaign in the 2014–15 season, leading to his eventual selection by the Nashville Predators in the 2015 NHL entry draft.

During his final QMJHL season with the Olympiques in 2015–16, Carrier was signed to a three-year, entry-level contract by the Predators on November 12, 2015. Appearing in 57 games with Gatineau, he matched his previous best goal output with 12 and contributed 47 total points before being ousted by the Moncton Wildcats in the second-round of that year's QMJHL playoffs.

=== Professional ===
Carrier was assigned to begin the 2016–17 season in the American Hockey League (AHL) with the Predators' top affiliate, the Milwaukee Admirals. Leading the Admirals' defence core in scoring which earned him selection to the 2017 AHL All-Star Game, he received his first NHL recall on January 13. Carrier made his NHL debut in a 1–0 loss to the Vancouver Canucks on January 21. After two scoreless games with Nashville, he was returned to the Admirals for the remainder of the AHL season. He was named as an alternate captain for Milwaukee in advance of the 2019–20 season.

Following the completion of his entry-level contract, Carrier agreed to a three-year extension with the Predators organization in April 2020. His first career NHL goal came amidst the pandemic-shortened season in the third period of a 6-3 loss versus the Tampa Bay Lightning on March 13, 2021. He likewise made his Stanley Cup playoffs debut during the Predators' 2021 first-round series against the Carolina Hurricanes, collecting two assists across six games played.

Securing a full-time roster spot with Nashville ahead of the 2021–22 season, Carrier registered 30 points through 77 games and was named to the annual NHL All-Rookie Team. Injuries plagued his 2022–23 production whereas he would be sidelined following a fight with Winnipeg Jets' forward Logan Stanley in a game on January 24, only to suffer a season-ending collarbone fracture upon his return. Despite these setbacks, the Predators opted to re-sign Carrier to a one-year extension on July 1.

In advance of the 2024–25 season, Carrier signed a new three-year, $11.25 million extension with the Predators on July 1, 2024. Prior to the annual holiday roster freeze, he was traded to the Montreal Canadiens in exchange for fellow defenceman Justin Barron on December 18. Carrier immediately joined the team on the road, making his Canadiens debut at Little Caesars Arena two days later versus the Detroit Red Wings. He registered his first franchise point in a 5–1 win over the Red Wings on December 21.

Over the course of the 2025–26 season, Carrier recorded his 100th career NHL point on January 12, 2026. Scoring twice in the span of 20 seconds, he tied Bert Corbeau for the second-fastest consecutive goals during a game by a Canadiens defenceman in franchise history, trailing only Larry Robinson (19 seconds).

== International play ==
Medal record

Representing Canada

Men's ice hockey

World U18 Championships
Bronze medal – third place	2014 Finland	

Ivan Hlinka Memorial Cup
Gold medal – first place	2013 Slovakia/Czech Republic	

Internationally, Carrier first represented Hockey Canada as part of team Canada Quebec at the 2013 World U-17 Hockey Challenge where his team ultimately finished in fourth place following a loss to Team USA in the bronze medal game. Thereafter, he was named to the Canadian national under-18 team for the 2013 Ivan Hlinka Memorial Cup, capturing a gold medal. The following year, Carrier participated at the IIHF World U18 Championships, earning bronze along with his country.

== Personal life ==
Carrier met his wife, fellow Québécois Alicia Lessard, while playing for the QMJHL's Gatineau Olympiques in 2015. The couple were engaged in July 2022 and married two years later at a vineyard located in Sutton, Quebec. Lessard completed her residence in family medicine at McGill University and is co-owner of a medical practice in Côte Saint-Luc.

== Career statistics ==
=== Regular season and playoffs ===
			Regular season					Playoffs
Season	Team	League	GP	G	A	Pts	PIM	GP	G	A	Pts	PIM
2011–12	Collège Antoine-Girouard Gaulois	QMAAA	40	5	25	30	30	11	1	1	2	2
2012–13	Gatineau Olympiques	QMJHL	50	2	5	7	28	9	1	0	1	6
2013–14	Gatineau Olympiques	QMJHL	67	3	25	28	29	9	1	4	5	4
2014–15	Gatineau Olympiques	QMJHL	68	12	43	55	64	11	2	3	5	18
2015–16	Gatineau Olympiques	QMJHL	57	12	35	47	50	10	0	5	5	4
2016–17	Milwaukee Admirals	AHL	72	6	33	39	45	3	0	2	2	0
2016–17	Nashville Predators	NHL	2	0	0	0	0	—	—	—	—	—
2017–18	Milwaukee Admirals	AHL	73	4	24	28	52	—	—	—	—	—
2018–19	Milwaukee Admirals	AHL	76	5	32	37	47	5	0	0	0	2
2019–20	Milwaukee Admirals	AHL	55	5	32	37	44	—	—	—	—	—
2019–20	Nashville Predators	NHL	3	0	0	0	2	—	—	—	—	—
2020–21	Chicago Wolves	AHL	3	0	1	1	0	—	—	—	—	—
2020–21	Nashville Predators	NHL	19	1	2	3	8	6	0	2	2	4
2021–22	Nashville Predators	NHL	77	3	27	30	50	4	0	3	3	2
2022–23	Nashville Predators	NHL	43	2	7	9	27	—	—	—	—	—
2023–24	Nashville Predators	NHL	73	4	16	20	44	6	1	2	3	0
2024–25	Nashville Predators	NHL	28	1	6	7	12	—	—	—	—	—
2024–25	Montreal Canadiens	NHL	51	2	16	18	28	5	1	1	2	0
2025–26	Montreal Canadiens	NHL	73	7	15	22	34	19	1	6	7	26
NHL totals			369	20	89	109	205	40	3	14	17	32

=== International ===
Year	Team	Event	Result	GP	G	A	Pts	PIM
2013	Canada Quebec	U17	4th	6	0	1	1	10
2013	Canada	IH18	1st place, gold medalist(s)	5	0	0	0	0
2014	Canada	U18	3rd place, bronze medalist(s)	7	0	0	0	0
Junior totals				18	0	1	1	10

== Awards and honours ==
Award	Year	Ref
QMAAA
Second All-Star Team	2012	
QMJHL
CHL Canada/Russia Series	2014	
Second All-Star Team	2015	
AHL
All-Star Game	2017, 2020	
NHL
All-Rookie Team	2022	
