= Anthony Richard =

Canadian ice hockey player (born 1996)

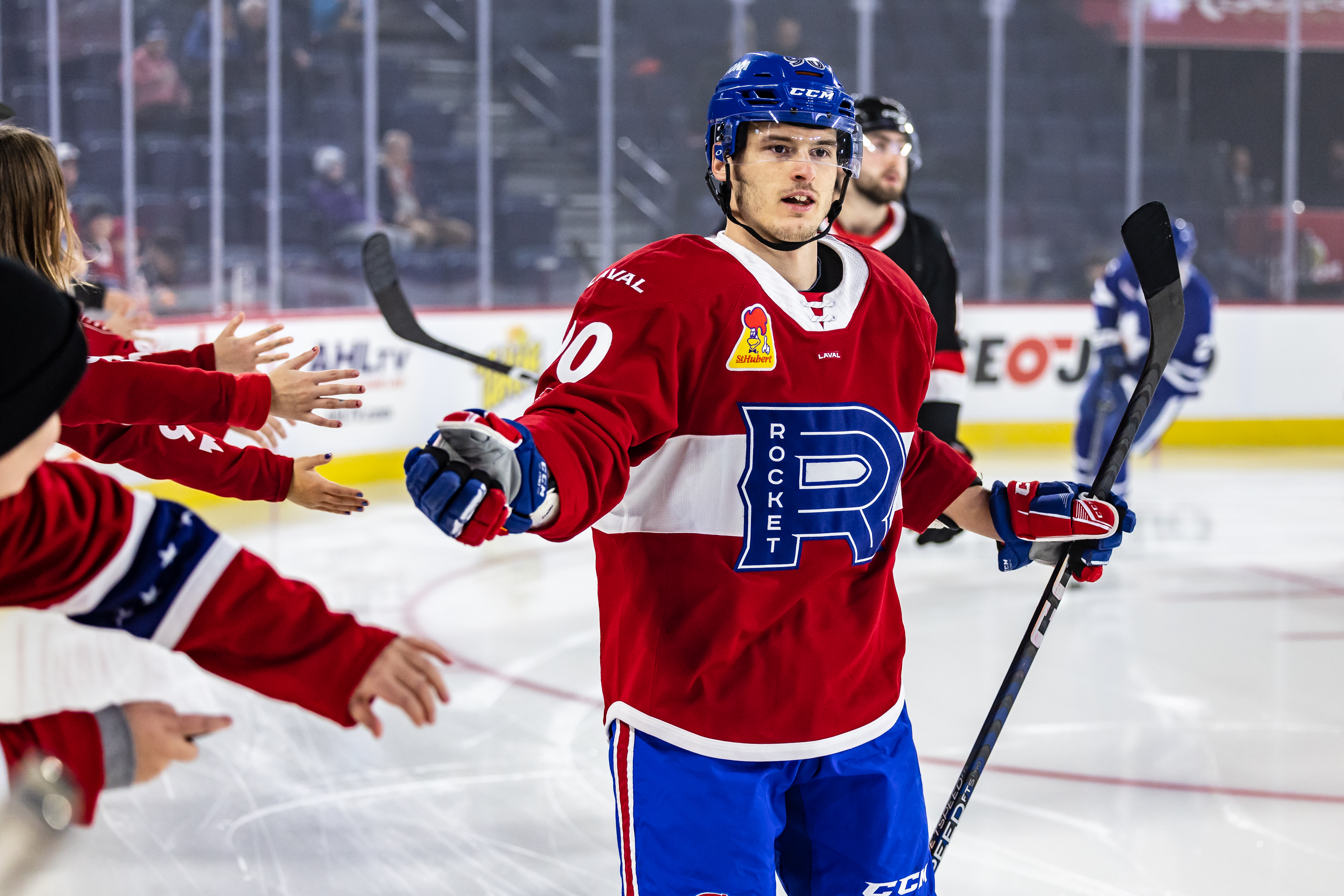
- Richard with the Laval Rocket in 2023
- Born: December 20, 1996 (age 29) Trois-Rivières, Quebec, Canada
- Height: 5 ft 10 in (178 cm)
- Weight: 185 lb (84 kg; 13 st 3 lb)
- Position: Left wing
- Shoots: Left
- NL team Former teams: HC Fribourg-Gotteron; Nashville Predators; Montreal Canadiens; Boston Bruins; Philadelphia Flyers
- NHL draft: 100th overall, 2015; Nashville Predators
- Playing career: 2016–present

Anthony Richard (born December 20, 1996) is a Canadian professional ice hockey forward for HC Fribourg-Gotteron of the National League (NL). He was selected in the fourth round, 100th overall, by the Nashville Predators in the 2015 NHL entry draft. Richard has also previously played in the National Hockey League (NHL) for the Montreal Canadiens, Boston Bruins, and Philadelphia Flyers.

== Playing career ==
Richard played major junior hockey with the Val-d'Or Foreurs of the Quebec Major Junior Hockey League (QMJHL) and was drafted in 2015 by the Nashville Predators of the National Hockey League (NHL) in the fourth round (100th overall).

In his fourth and final season with the Foreurs in 2015–16, Richard was signed to a three-year, entry-level contract with the Nashville Predators on November 14, 2015.

In the 2018–19 season, Richard was recalled from American Hockey League (AHL) affiliate, the Milwaukee Admirals, to the Predators on December 1, 2018, due to an injury to forward Filip Forsberg and made his NHL debut the same day against the Chicago Blackhawks in a 5–2 victory. He was returned to the Admirals following the game.

During the 2021–22 season, having contributed with 7 goals and 12 points through 31 regular season games with the Milwaukee while in the midst of his sixth year within the Predators organization, Richard was traded to the Tampa Bay Lightning in exchange for Jimmy Huntington on February 1, 2022.

On July 13, 2022, Richard signed as a free agent to a one-year, two-way contract with the Montreal Canadiens for the 2022–23 season. With his customary jersey number 20 already in use by Juraj Slafkovský, Richard instead adopted number 90, in reference to iconic Canadiens player Maurice "Rocket" Richard's number 9. He was assigned to play with the Canadiens' AHL affiliate Laval Rocket, and made an immediate impact even as the team struggled. His performance with the team was sufficiently strong to begin debate as to whether or when he might be called up to play in the NHL. On December 18, the Canadiens announced that he had been called up from the Rocket. At the time of the call, Richard had scored a league-leading 18 goals in 27 games, and with 31 points was third in the points standings. He made his debut for the Canadiens in a December 19 game against the Arizona Coyotes. On December 21, 2022, he scored his first NHL goal against the Colorado Avalanche, on a breakaway deke against goaltender Alexandar Georgiev. Richard played seven games with the Canadiens before returning to the Rocket. He completed the season having tallied 3 goals and 5 points in just 13 games with the Canadiens.

As a free agent from the Canadiens, Richard signed a one-year, two-way contract with the Boston Bruins on July 1, 2023. He was recalled by Boston from the Providence Bruins on February 8, 2024. He made his Bruins debut on February 10 against the Washington Capitals in a 0–3 loss.

Leaving the Bruins at the conclusion of his contract, Richard was signed as a free agent a two-year, two-way contract with the Philadelphia Flyers on July 2, 2024.

After his second season in the Flyers organization, Richard signed with HC Fribourg-Gotteron of the Swiss National League on May 18, 2026.

== Career statistics ==
=== Regular season and playoffs ===
			Regular season					Playoffs
Season	Team	League	GP	G	A	Pts	PIM	GP	G	A	Pts	PIM
2011–12	Trois-Rivières Estacades	QMAAA	41	11	17	28	50	8	3	5	8	14
2012–13	Trois-Rivières Estacades	QMAAA	12	9	6	15	8	—	—	—	—	—
2012–13	Val-d'Or Foreurs	QMJHL	42	6	2	8	15	9	0	1	1	5
2013–14	Val-d'Or Foreurs	QMJHL	66	25	27	52	49	24	10	7	17	12
2014–15	Val-d'Or Foreurs	QMJHL	66	43	48	91	78	17	12	10	22	10
2015–16	Val-d'Or Foreurs	QMJHL	58	37	50	87	37	3	2	1	3	2
2015–16	Milwaukee Admirals	AHL	—	—	—	—	—	3	0	0	0	0
2016–17	Milwaukee Admirals	AHL	55	4	12	16	23	3	0	1	1	4
2016–17	Cincinnati Cyclones	ECHL	5	1	1	2	0	—	—	—	—	—
2017–18	Milwaukee Admirals	AHL	75	19	17	36	45	—	—	—	—	—
2018–19	Milwaukee Admirals	AHL	73	24	23	47	24	5	4	1	5	9
2018–19	Nashville Predators	NHL	1	0	0	0	0	—	—	—	—	—
2019–20	Milwaukee Admirals	AHL	60	14	9	23	25	—	—	—	—	—
2019–20	Nashville Predators	NHL	1	0	0	0	0	—	—	—	—	—
2020–21	Chicago Wolves	AHL	28	11	7	18	36	—	—	—	—	—
2021–22	Milwaukee Admirals	AHL	31	7	5	12	14	—	—	—	—	—
2021–22	Syracuse Crunch	AHL	40	10	16	26	10	5	4	2	6	0
2022–23	Laval Rocket	AHL	60	30	37	67	46	2	0	1	1	0
2022–23	Montreal Canadiens	NHL	13	3	2	5	6	—	—	—	—	—
2023–24	Providence Bruins	AHL	59	25	30	55	37	3	0	1	1	2
2023–24	Boston Bruins	NHL	9	1	2	3	2	—	—	—	—	—
2024–25	Lehigh Valley Phantoms	AHL	42	17	19	36	31	7	4	3	7	18
2024–25	Philadelphia Flyers	NHL	15	2	4	6	0	—	—	—	—	—
2025–26	Lehigh Valley Phantoms	AHL	66	18	27	45	37	—	—	—	—	—
2025–26	Philadelphia Flyers	NHL	1	0	0	0	0	—	—	—	—	—
NHL totals			40	6	8	14	8	—	—	—	—	—

=== International ===
Year	Team	Event	Result	GP	G	A	Pts	PIM
2013	Canada Quebec	U17	4th	6	1	0	1	10
Junior totals				6	1	0	1	10

== Awards and honours ==
Award	Year	Ref
QMJHL
President's Cup champion	2014	
AHL
All-Star Game	2023	
