= Clark Bishop =

Canadian ice hockey player (born 1996)

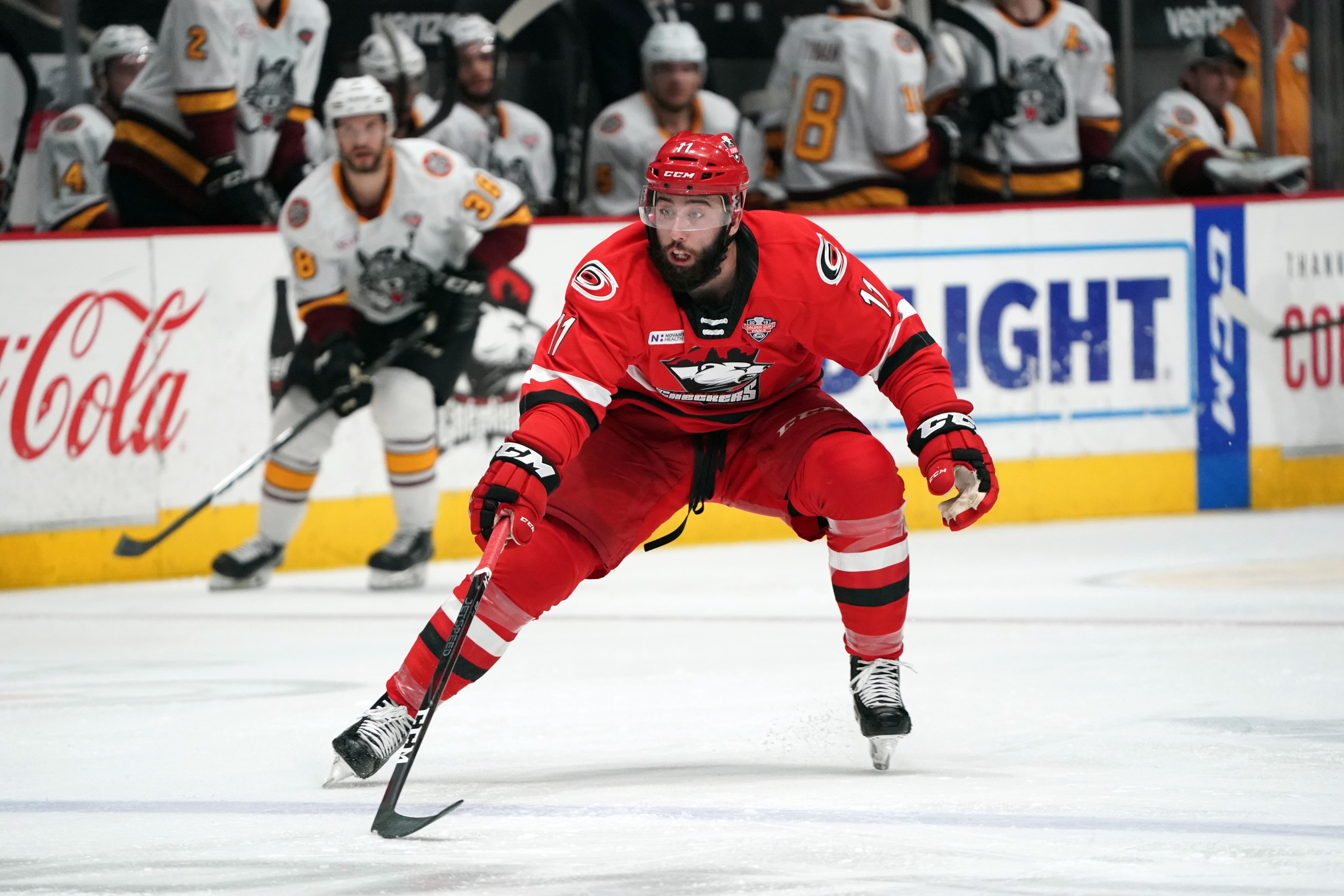
- Bishop with the Charlotte Checkers in 2019
- Born: March 29, 1996 (age 30) St. John's, Newfoundland, Canada
- Height: 6 ft 0 in (183 cm)
- Weight: 197 lb (89 kg; 14 st 1 lb)
- Position: Centre
- Shoots: Left
- AHL team Former teams: Syracuse Crunch; Carolina Hurricanes; Ottawa Senators; Calgary Flames
- NHL draft: 127th overall, 2014; Carolina Hurricanes
- Playing career: 2016–present

Clark Bishop (born March 29, 1996) is a Canadian professional ice hockey center currently playing with the Syracuse Crunch in the American Hockey League (AHL). He was selected by the Carolina Hurricanes in the 2014 NHL Draft (5th round, 127th overall).

== Playing career ==
Born in St. John's, Newfoundland and Labrador, Bishop played for Avalon Minor Hockey and later for the St. John's Pennecon Privateers and Gonzaga Vikings, before joining the Cape Breton Screaming Eagles of the Quebec Major Junior Hockey League in 2012. During his four-year tenure with the Screaming Eagles, he made 214 appearances (including 12 playoff games) for the team, scoring 63 goals and assisting on 75 more. He served as team captain in 2014–15 and 2015–16.

Bishop inked a three-year entry-level contract with the Carolina Hurricanes of the National Hockey League (NHL) on April 4, 2016. On October 17, 2018, Bishop was called up from the Hurricanes American Hockey League (AHL) affiliate, the Charlotte Checkers, and he made his NHL debut on October 20 in a 3–1 loss to the Colorado Avalanche. Bishop was reassigned to the Checkers on October 23. Bishop was recalled again on November 29 after Haydn Fleury was placed on injured reserve. He recorded his first career NHL goal on December 7 in a 4–1 win over the Anaheim Ducks. On December 16, Bishop was reassigned to the Charlotte Checkers.

Bishop bounced between the Hurricanes and Checkers in the 2018–19 season, playing in 20 regular season games and two playoff games for Carolina as a fourth-line center. With the Checkers he won the AHL's Calder Cup. At the opening of the 2019–20 season, Bishop failed to make the Hurricanes out of training camp and was placed on waivers for the purposes of assigning him to Charlotte. He cleared waivers and was assigned to Charlotte where he played the majority of the season. He appeared in five games for the Hurricanes, registering one point.

In October 13, 2020, Bishop signed a one-year extension with the Hurricanes. After attending the Hurricanes training camp for the delayed 2020–21 season, Bishop failed to make the roster and was placed on waivers. On January 12, 2021, he was traded by Carolina to the Ottawa Senators in exchange for Maxime Lajoie. He was directly assigned to join AHL affiliate, the Belleville Senators. Bishop was recalled to Ottawa on March 1. He made his debut for the Senators on March 12, 2021, against the Edmonton Oilers. On April 9, 2021, Bishop was again placed on waivers. He finished the season playing in thirteen games with Ottawa, registering three points.

On May 21, 2021, Bishop was re-signed by the Senators to a one-year, two-way contract extension. During the Senators training camp, Bishop suffered an injury that kept him out of the lineup until November. He split the season between Ottawa and Belleville, playing in nine games with Ottawa, registering one point.

As a free agent from the Senators, Bishop was signed to a one-year, two-way contract with the Calgary Flames on July 13, 2022. He spent the entirety of the season with Calgary's AHL affiliate, the Calgary Wranglers, scoring 11 goals and 23 points in 64 games. On October 24, 2022, Bishop was suspended for four games for an illegal cross-check in a game against the Colorado Eagles. On June 14, 2023 he signed a two-year two-way contract with the Flames. Bishop attended the Flames' 2023 training camp, but failed to make the roster. He was placed on a waivers, and after going unclaimed, assigned to the Wranglers to start the 2023–24 season.

After four seasons within the Flames organization, Bishop left as a free agent and was signed to a one-year contract to continue in the AHL with the Syracuse Crunch, the primary affiliate to the Tampa Bay Lightning, on July 1, 2026.

== International play ==
Bishop was part of Canada's U18 national team that won the 2013 Ivan Hlinka Memorial Tournament in Breclav and Piestany. The same year, he represented Canada Atlantic at the World Under-17 Hockey Challenge in Victoriaville and Drummondville, Québec.

== Career statistics ==
=== Regular season and playoffs ===
			Regular season					Playoffs
Season	Team	League	GP	G	A	Pts	PIM	GP	G	A	Pts	PIM
2011–12	St. John's Privateers	NLMMHL	23	18	20	38	45	8	3	6	9	10
2012–13	Cape Breton Screaming Eagles	QMJHL	58	8	14	22	33	—	—	—	—	—
2013–14	Cape Breton Screaming Eagles	QMJHL	56	14	19	33	54	4	1	0	1	8
2014–15	Cape Breton Screaming Eagles	QMJHL	38	19	16	35	54	7	5	3	8	4
2015–16	Cape Breton Screaming Eagles	QMJHL	50	16	23	39	86	3	1	2	3	0
2016–17	Charlotte Checkers	AHL	42	2	4	6	11	—	—	—	—	—
2016–17	Florida Everblades	ECHL	21	3	8	11	16	—	—	—	—	—
2017–18	Charlotte Checkers	AHL	68	7	21	28	32	8	2	0	2	8
2018–19	Charlotte Checkers	AHL	38	3	3	6	56	16	2	1	3	14
2018–19	Carolina Hurricanes	NHL	20	1	2	3	6	2	0	0	0	0
2019–20	Charlotte Checkers	AHL	53	6	13	19	63	—	—	—	—	—
2019–20	Carolina Hurricanes	NHL	5	0	1	1	4	—	—	—	—	—
2020–21	Belleville Senators	AHL	8	2	3	5	6	—	—	—	—	—
2020–21	Ottawa Senators	NHL	13	0	3	3	4	—	—	—	—	—
2021–22	Belleville Senators	AHL	35	6	6	12	36	2	0	0	0	0
2021–22	Ottawa Senators	NHL	9	0	1	1	6	—	—	—	—	—
2022–23	Calgary Wranglers	AHL	64	11	12	23	58	9	2	1	3	6
2023–24	Calgary Wranglers	AHL	57	10	12	22	72	6	0	0	0	2
2024–25	Calgary Wranglers	AHL	66	19	19	38	31	2	0	0	0	2
2024–25	Calgary Flames	NHL	6	1	0	1	0	—	—	—	—	—
2025–26	Calgary Wranglers	AHL	72	14	13	27	63	—	—	—	—	—
NHL totals			53	2	7	9	20	2	0	0	0	0

=== International ===
Year	Team	Event	Result	GP	G	A	Pts	PIM
2013	Canada Atlantic	U17	8th	5	3	2	5	8
2013	Canada	IH18	1st place, gold medalist(s)	5	1	0	1	4
2014	Canada	U18	3rd place, bronze medalist(s)	7	0	1	1	2
Junior totals				17	4	3	7	14

== Awards and honours ==
Award	Year
AHL
Calder Cup (Charlotte Checkers)	2019
