= 2014–15 QMJHL season =

- League: Quebec Major Junior Hockey League
- Sport: Hockey
- Duration: Regular season September 10, 2014 – March 22, 2015; Playoffs; March 26, 2015 – May 18, 2015
- Teams: 18
- TV partner: Eastlink TV

Draft
- Top draft pick: Luke Green
- Picked by: Saint John Sea Dogs

Regular Season
- Jean Rougeau Trophy: Rimouski Océanic (3)
- Season MVP: Conor Garland (Moncton Wildcats)
- Top scorer: Conor Garland (Moncton Wildcats)

Playoffs
- Playoffs MVP: Adam Erne (Remparts)
- Finals champions: Rimouski Océanic
- Runners-up: Quebec Remparts

QMJHL seasons
- 2013–14 2015–16

2014–15 CHL season
- League: Canadian Hockey League
- Sport: Ice hockey
- Duration: OHL; September 2014 – March 2015; QMJHL; September 2014 – March 2015; WHL; September 2014 – March 2015
- Teams: 60
- TV partner(s): RDS, Rogers Sportsnet, Rogers TV, Shaw TV
- Season MVP: Connor McDavid (Erie Otters) (OHL)
- Top scorer: Dylan Strome (Erie Otters) (OHL) & Conor Garland (Moncton Wildcats) (QMJHL)

Memorial Cup
- Finals champions: Oshawa Generals (OHL) (1st title)
- Runners-up: Kelowna Rockets (WHL)

The 2014–15 QMJHL season is the 46th season of the Quebec Major Junior Hockey League (QMJHL). The regular season consisted of eighteen teams playing 68 games each, beginning on September 10, 2014, and ending on March 22, 2015.

== Regular season standings ==
Note: GP = Games played; W = Wins; L = Losses; OTL = Overtime losses; SL = Shootout losses; GF = Goals for; GA = Goals against; PTS = Points; x = clinched playoff berth; y = clinched division title

Maritimes Division	GP	W	L	OTL	SL	PTS	GF	GA	Rank
y–Moncton Wildcats	68	46	19	0	3	95	287	232	2
x–Charlottetown Islanders	68	35	28	1	4	75	226	243	9
x–Saint John Sea Dogs	68	32	26	4	6	74	237	241	10
x–Halifax Mooseheads	68	32	30	4	2	70	227	242	12
x–Cape Breton Screaming Eagles	68	31	31	3	3	68	258	246	13
Acadie–Bathurst Titan	68	17	43	6	2	42	158	271	18

East Division	GP	W	L	OTL	SL	PTS	GF	GA	Rank
y–Rimouski Océanic	68	47	16	3	2	99	279	198	1
x–Quebec Remparts	68	40	25	1	2	83	267	232	4
x–Shawinigan Cataractes	68	39	26	1	2	81	259	214	5
x–Baie-Comeau Drakkar	68	35	25	5	3	78	227	237	7
x–Chicoutimi Saguenéens	68	29	32	4	3	65	203	238	15
x–Victoriaville Tigres	68	27	34	3	4	61	248	275	16

West Division	GP	W	L	OTL	SL	PTS	GF	GA	Rank
y–Blainville-Boisbriand Armada	68	41	18	2	7	91	244	185	3
x–Val-d'Or Foreurs	68	35	25	3	5	78	283	266	6
x–Sherbrooke Phoenix	68	36	26	2	4	78	228	245	8
x–Rouyn-Noranda Huskies	68	33	30	4	1	71	246	245	11
x–Gatineau Olympiques	68	31	31	0	6	68	234	242	14
Drummondville Voltigeurs	68	26	38	1	3	56	195	254	17

Note: Tiebreaker for 6th, 7th and 8th based on regulation and overtime wins only. Val-d'Or had 31, Baie-Comeau had 30, Sherbrooke had 29.

== Scoring leaders ==
Note: GP = Games played; G = Goals; A = Assists; Pts = Points; PIM = Penalty minutes

Player	Team	GP	G	A	Pts	PIM
Conor Garland	Moncton Wildcats	67	35	94	129	66
Danick Martel	Blainville-Boisbriand Armada	64	48	54	102	85
Nikolaj Ehlers	Halifax Mooseheads	51	37	64	101	67
Nikita Jevpalovs	Blainville-Boisbriand Armada	64	49	51	100	30
Angelo Miceli	Victoriaville Tigres	64	38	58	96	50
Alexis Loiseau	Rimouski Océanic	68	35	61	96	42
Ivan Barbashev	Moncton Wildcats	57	45	50	95	59
Anthony Beauvillier	Shawinigan Cataractes	67	42	52	94	72
Anthony DeLuca	Rimouski Océanic	68	44	47	91	63
Anthony Richard	Val-d'Or Foreurs	66	43	48	91	78

== Leading goaltenders ==
Note: GP = Games played; Mins = Minutes played; W = Wins; L = Losses: OTL = Overtime losses; SL = Shootout losses; GA = Goals Allowed; SO = Shutouts; GAA = Goals against average

Player	Team	GP	Mins	W	L	OTL	SL	GA	SO	Sv%	GAA
Philippe Desrosiers	Rimouski Océanic	44	2469	29	9	1	2	103	5	.901	2.50
Samuel Montembeault	Blainville-Boisbriand Armada	52	3104	33	11	2	5	134	3	.891	2.59
Marvin Cupper	Shawinigan Cataractes	59	3486	36	20	0	2	163	4	.912	2.80
Louis-Philip Guindon	Rimouski Océanic	37	2112	18	15	1	2	103	2	.895	2.92
Alex Dubeau	Moncton Wildcats	58	3255	41	13	0	1	162	4	.900	2.99

== 2015 President's Cup playoffs ==
Round 1
1	Rimouski	4
16	Victoriaville	0
3	Blainville-Boisbriand	2
14	Gatineau	4
6	Val-d'Or	4
11	Rouyn-Noranda	2
7	Baie-Comeau	4
10	Saint John	1
2	Moncton	4
15	Chicoutimi	1
5	Shawinigan	3
12	Halifax	4
4	Quebec	4
13	Cape Breton	3
8	Sherbrooke	2
9	Charlottetown	4

Quarter-finals
1	Rimouski	4
14	Gatineau	1
6	Val-d'Or	4
7	Baie-Comeau	3
2	Moncton	4
12	Halifax	3
4	Quebec	4
9	Charlottetown	0

Semi-finals
1	Rimouski	4
6	Val-d'Or	0
2	Moncton	0
4	Quebec	4

President's Cup Championship
1	Rimouski	4
4	Quebec	3

== First round ==
=== (1) Rimouski Océanic vs. (16) Victoriaville Tigres ===
March 27	Rimouski Océanic	4 – 3	OT	Victoriaville Tigres	Colisée de Rimouski	Recap
5:56 - pp - Justin Samson (1)		First period		No scoring
7:25 - Anthony DeLuca (1)		Second period		Angelo Miceli (1) - pp - 2:45; Gabriel Gagné (1) - 12:02
6:14 - pp - Alexis Loiseau (1)		Third period		Samuel Blais (1) - pp - 13:54
0:39 - Christopher Clapperton (1)		First overtime period		No scoring
Philippe Desrosiers (15 saves / 18 shots)		Goalie stats		Chase Marchand (41 saves / 45 shots)

March 28	Rimouski Océanic	5 – 3	Victoriaville Tigres	Colisée de Rimouski	Recap
11:14 - Simon Bourque (1)		First period	No scoring
16:07 - Michael Joly (1)		Second period	Phil Pietroniro (1) - pp - 16:54
3:50 - Christopher Clapperton (2); 4:43 - Anthony Chapados (1); 19:29 - Deven St-Hilaire (1)		Third period	Samuel Blais (2) - pp - 6:00; Tristan Pomerleau (1) - 6:32
Louis-Philip Guindon (22 saves / 25 shots)		Goalie stats	Chase Marchand (32 saves / 37 shots)

March 31	Victoriaville Tigres	1 – 8	Rimouski Océanic	Colisée Desjardins	Recap
8:47 - Nikita Li (1)		First period	Alexis Loiseau (2) - pp - 1:38; Christopher Clapperton (3) - pp - 5:01; Anthony DeLuca (2) - pp - 18:03
No scoring		Second period	Michael Joly (2) - sh - 11:00; Jan Košťálek (1) - pp - 15:31; Michael Joly (3) - ps - 19:53
No scoring		Third period	Deven St-Hilaire (2) - 9:14; Anthony Chapados (2) - 16:29
Chase Marchand (21 saves / 26 shots); Olivier Tremblay (9 saves / 12 shots)		Goalie stats	Louis-Philip Guindon (19 saves / 20 shots)

April 1	Victoriaville Tigres	2 – 4	Rimouski Océanic	Colisée Desjardins	Recap
4:27 - pp - Gabriel Gagné (2)		First period	Anthony DeLuca (3) - 1:50
7:52 - Martin-Olivier Cardinal (1)		Second period	Christopher Clapperton (4) - 17:45
No scoring		Third period	Jan Košťálek (2) - 18:53; Samuel Morin (1) - en - 19:59
Chase Marchand (33 saves / 36 shots)		Goalie stats	Philippe Desrosiers (26 saves / 28 shots)

Rimouski wins series 4 – 0

=== (2) Moncton Wildcats vs. (15) Chicoutimi Saguenéens ===
March 26	Moncton Wildcats	4 – 2	Chicoutimi Saguenéens	Moncton Coliseum	Recap
10:47 - pp - Ivan Barbashev (1)		First period	No scoring
10:18 - Garrett Johnston (1); 17:17 - Éric Léger (1)		Second period	Laurent Dauphin (1) - 5:00
0:17 - pp - Taylor Burke (1)		Third period	Janne Puhakka (1) - pp - 16:57
Alex Dubeau (31 saves / 33 shots)		Goalie stats	Julio Billia (33 saves / 37 shots)

March 29	Moncton Wildcats	2 – 3	Chicoutimi Saguenéens	Moncton Coliseum	Recap
12:14 - pp - Ivan Barbashev (2)		First period	Nicolas Roy (1) - pp - 5:49
10:04 - pp - Jacob Sweeney (1)		Second period	Laurent Dauphin (2) - pp - 8:46; Nicolas Roy (2) - 10:27
No scoring		Third period	No scoring
Alex Dubeau (33 saves / 36 shots)		Goalie stats	Julio Billia (30 saves / 32 shots)

April 1	Chicoutimi Saguenéens	1 – 3	Moncton Wildcats	Centre Georges-Vézina	Recap
17:05 - Janne Puhakka (2)		First period	No scoring
No scoring		Second period	Zach Malatesta (1) - 10:03
No scoring		Third period	Stephen Johnson (1) - 16:56; Ivan Barbashev (3) - pp - en - 19:52
Julio Billia (33 saves / 35 shots)		Goalie stats	Alex Dubeau (30 saves / 31 shots)

April 2	Chicoutimi Saguenéens	3 – 4	Moncton Wildcats	Centre Georges-Vézina	Recap
No scoring		First period	No scoring
4:49 - Laurent Dauphin (3); 19:16 - Laurent Dauphin (4)		Second period	Zach Malatesta (2) - pp - 1:59
2:36 - pp - Laurent Dauphin (5)		Third period	Stephen Johnson (2) - 11:33; Conor Garland (1) - 12:30; Stephen Johnson (3) - 17:05
Julio Billia (35 saves / 39 shots)		Goalie stats	Alex Dubeau (27 saves / 30 shots)

April 4	Chicoutimi Saguenéens	1 – 4	Moncton Wildcats	Centre Georges-Vézina	Recap
Gabryel Paquin-Boudreau (1) - 7:38		First period	No scoring
No scoring		Second period	3:23 - Kyle Tibbo (1); 5:57 - pp - Jacob Sweeney (2)
No scoring		Third period	18:19 - en - Stephen Johnson (4); 18:36 - en - William Bower (1)
Julio Billia (31 saves / 33 shots)		Goalie stats	Alex Dubeau (35 saves / 36 shots)

Moncton wins series 4 – 1

=== (3) Blainville-Boisbriand Armada vs. (14) Gatineau Olympiques ===
March 27	Blainville-Boisbriand Armada	1 – 4	Gatineau Olympiques	Centre d'Excellence Sports Rousseau	Recap
No scoring		First period	Valentin Zykov (1) - 0:32; Yakov Trenin (1) - 8:15
No scoring		Second period	No scoring
1:32 - pp - Danick Martel (1)		Third period	Joey Richard (1) - 18:11; Alexandre Carrier (1) - en - 19:21
Sam Montembeault (16 saves / 19 shots)		Goalie stats	François Brassard (34 saves / 35 shots)

March 28	Blainville-Boisbriand Armada	4 – 1	Gatineau Olympiques	Centre d'Excellence Sports Rousseau	Recap
9:34 - Nathanael Halbert (1); 13:22 - pp - Daniel Walcott (1)		First period	Alexandre Carrier (2) - 12:10
16:33 - pp - Danick Martel (2)		Second period	No scoring
16:09 - en - Yvan Mongo (1)		Third period	No scoring
Sam Montembeault (13 saves / 14 shots)		Goalie stats	François Brassard (21 saves / 24 shots)

March 31	Gatineau Olympiques	4 – 2	Blainville-Boisbriand Armada	Robert Guertin Centre	Recap
1:18 - Yakov Trenin (2)		First period	No scoring
No scoring		Second period	Philippe Sanche (1) - pp - 0:46; Miguel Picard (1) - sh - 11:18
4:48 - Jake Coughler (1); 5:26 - Louick Marcotte (1); 18:33 - Valentin Zykov (2)		Third period	No scoring
François Brassard (20 saves / 22 shots)		Goalie stats	Sam Montembeault (16 saves / 20 shots)

April 1	Gatineau Olympiques	1 – 4	Blainville-Boisbriand Armada	Robert Guertin Centre	Recap
No scoring		First period	Ņikita Jevpalovs (1) - 8:34
5:30 - pp - Alexandre Alain (1)		Second period	Philippe Sanche (2) - pp - 1:22; Danick Martel (3) - 5:44; Emil Aronsson (1) - 12:07
No scoring		Third period	No scoring
François Brassard (12 saves / 16 shots); Nicolas Lachance (10 saves / 10 shots)		Goalie stats	Sam Montembeault (15 saves / 16 shots)

April 3	Blainville-Boisbriand Armada	0 – 1	Gatineau Olympiques	Centre d'Excellence Sports Rousseau	Recap
No scoring		First period	No scoring
No scoring		Second period	Mickaël Beauregard (1) - 13:16
No scoring		Third period	No scoring
Sam Montembeault (18 saves / 19 shots)		Goalie stats	François Brassard (38 saves / 38 shots)

April 5	Gatineau Olympiques	4 – 1	Blainville-Boisbriand Armada	Robert Guertin Centre	Recap
No scoring		First period	No scoring
3:39 - Alex Breton (1); 11:51 - Élie Bérubé (1)		Second period	No scoring
3:53 - Joey Richard (2); 7:57 - Valentin Zykov (3)		Third period	Danick Martel (4) - 14:22
François Brassard (31 saves / 32 shots)		Goalie stats	Sam Montembeault (23 saves / 27 shots)

Gatineau wins series 4 – 2

=== (4) Quebec Remparts vs. (13) Cape Breton Screaming Eagles ===
March 27	Quebec Remparts	2 – 3	Cape Breton Screaming Eagles	Colisée Pepsi	Recap
No scoring		First period	Matthew Nosella (1) - 8:42
4:30 - Adam Erne (1)		Second period	Dillon Boucher (1) - 4:04
13:38 - Vladimir Tkachev (1)		Third period	Evgeny Svechnikov (1) - pp - 14:05
Callum Booth (20 saves / 23 shots)		Goalie stats	Alexandre Bélanger (25 saves / 27 shots)

March 28	Quebec Remparts	2 – 0	Cape Breton Screaming Eagles	Colisée Pepsi	Recap
18:17 - Marcus Cuomo (1)		First period	No scoring
3:10 - Ryan Graves (1)		Second period	No scoring
No scoring		Third period	No scoring
Callum Booth (31 saves / 31 shots)		Goalie stats	Alexandre Bélanger (36 saves / 38 shots)

March 31	Cape Breton Screaming Eagles	6 – 5	Quebec Remparts	Centre 200	Recap
7:01 - pp - Clark Bishop (1); 17:06 - Loïk Léveillé (1)		First period	No scoring
2:07 - sh - Marcus Hinds (1); 3:35 - pp - Pierre-Luc Dubois (1)		Second period	No scoring
4:43 - Loïk Léveillé (2); 15:39 - Bradley Lalonde (1)		Third period	Jérome Verrier (1) - pp - 3:22; Guillaume Gauthier (1) - pp - 7:24; Ryan Graves (2) - 8:15; Adam Erne (2) - 8:55; Raphaël Maheux (1) - 11:58
Alexandre Bélanger (26 saves / 31 shots); Miguel Sullivan (5 saves / 5 shots)		Goalie stats	Callum Booth (6 saves / 10 shots); Zachary Fucale (17 saves / 19 shots)

April 2	Cape Breton Screaming Eagles	5 – 6	Quebec Remparts	Centre 200	Recap
2:24 - pp - Jacob Smith (1); 7:39 - Jacob Smith (2); 12:39 - Clark Bishop (2)		First period	Anthony Duclair (1) - 4:19; Jérome Verrier (2) - pp - 8:59; Marcus Cuomo (2) - 10:46
9:44 - pp - Stephen Anderson (1)		Second period	Marc-Olivier Roy (1) - 3:56; Matt Murphy (1) - 4:12; Dmytro Timashov (1) - 10:24
13:45 - pp - Loïk Léveillé (3)		Third period	No scoring
Alexandre Bélanger (12 saves / 16 shots); Miguel Sullivan (19 saves / 21 shots)		Goalie stats	Zachary Fucale (15 saves / 20 shots)

April 3	Cape Breton Screaming Eagles	1 – 3	Quebec Remparts	Centre 200	Recap
Clark Bishop (3) - 4:26		First period	14:31 - pp - Kurt Etchegary (1)
No scoring		Second period	15:54 - Dmytro Timashov (2)
No scoring		Third period	3:52 - pp - Nikolas Brouillard (1)
Miguel Sullivan (34 saves / 37 shots)		Goalie stats	Zachary Fucale (24 saves / 25 shots)

April 6	Quebec Remparts	3 – 4	OT	Cape Breton Screaming Eagles	Colisée Pepsi	Recap
No scoring		First period		No scoring
Guillaume Gauthier (2) - 16:24		Second period		13:18 - Clark Bishop (4)
Adam Erne (3) - pp - 7:01; Adam Erne (4) - 19:36		Third period		9:45 - Pierre-Luc Dubois (2); 10:53 - Stephen Anderson (2)
No scoring		First overtime period		9:24 - Dillon Boucher (2)
Zachary Fucale (34 saves / 38 shots)		Goalie stats		Miguel Sullivan (46 saves / 49 shots)

April 7	Quebec Remparts	6 – 3	Cape Breton Screaming Eagles	Colisée Pepsi	Recap
19:52 - Dmytro Timashov (3)		First period	Jacob Smith (3) - 1:53; Clark Bishop (5) - 17:42
2:32 - Jérome Verrier (3); 7:03 - Massimo Carozza (1); 15:54 - pp - Ryan Graves (3)		Second period	No scoring
1:18 - Adam Erne (5); 17:00 - en - Adam Erne (6)		Third period	Kyle Farrell (1) - 19:55
Zachary Fucale (21 saves / 24 shots)		Goalie stats	Alexandre Bélanger (35 saves / 40 shots)

Quebec wins series 4 – 3

=== (5) Shawinigan Cataractes vs. (12) Halifax Mooseheads ===
March 27	Shawinigan Cataractes	2 – 3	Halifax Mooseheads	Centre Bionest de Shawinigan	Recap
No scoring		First period	Maxime Fortier (1) - 16:00
4:20 - pp - Brandon Gignac (1)		Second period	Ryan Falkenham (1) - pp - 12:00
8:03 - Anthony Beauvillier (1)		Third period	Danny Moynihan (1) - pp - 15:46
Marvin Cupper (32 saves / 35 shots)		Goalie stats	Éric Brassard (28 saves / 30 shots)

March 28	Shawinigan Cataractes	4 – 2	Halifax Mooseheads	Centre Bionest de Shawinigan	Recap
9:43 - Gabriel Slight (1); 12:33 - Zachary Taylor (1)		First period	No scoring
4:10 - pp - Brandon Gignac (2); 17:19 - Alexis D'Aoust (1)		Second period	No scoring
No scoring		Third period	Ryan Falkenham (2) - pp - 6:34; Danny Moynihan (2) - pp - 14:56
Marvin Cupper (25 saves / 27 shots)		Goalie stats	Éric Brassard (31 saves / 35 shots)

March 31	Halifax Mooseheads	2 – 3	OT	Shawinigan Cataractes	Halifax Forum	Recap
16:48 - pp - Timo Meier (1)		First period		No scoring
2:26 - pp - Danny Moynihan (3)		Second period		Nicholas Welsh (1) - 10:54; Dennis Yan (1) - 11:44
No scoring		Third period		No scoring
No scoring		First overtime period		Dennis Yan (2) - 10:48
Éric Brassard (35 saves / 38 shots)		Goalie stats		Marvin Cupper (41 saves / 43 shots)

April 1	Halifax Mooseheads	4 – 3	Shawinigan Cataractes	Halifax Forum	Recap
2:03 - Taylor Ford (1); 18:02 - pp - Timo Meier (2)		First period	Gabriel Slight (2) - 19:25
4:20 - pp - Danny Moynihan (4)		Second period	Gabriel Slight (3) - pp - 13:57
7:26 - Timo Meier (3)		Third period	Dennis Yan (3) - 18:56
Éric Brassard (46 saves / 49 shots)		Goalie stats	Marvin Cupper (35 saves / 39 shots)

April 3	Halifax Mooseheads	4 – 3	2OT	Shawinigan Cataractes	Halifax Forum	Recap
No scoring		First period		No scoring
Nikolaj Ehlers (1) - 0:41; Timo Meier (4) - 11:39		Second period		18:32 - Dennis Yan (4)
Danny Moynihan (5) - pp - 16:35		Third period		7:43 - Dennis Yan (5); 13:26 - pp - Dennis Yan (6)
Timo Meier (5) - 12:08		Second overtime period		No scoring
Éric Brassard (60 saves / 63 shots)		Goalie stats		Marvin Cupper (48 saves / 52 shots)

April 5	Shawinigan Cataractes	6 – 1	Halifax Mooseheads	Centre Bionest de Shawinigan	Recap
Giovanni Fiore (1) - 1:23; Anthony Beauvillier (2) - 4:52		First period	No scoring
No scoring		Second period	2:06 - pp - Ryan Falkenham (3)
Gabriel Slight (4) - pp - 4:42; Giovanni Fiore (2) - 7:21; Gabriel Slight (5) - pp - 11:18; Dylan Labbé (1) - pp - 14:10		Third period	No scoring
Marvin Cupper (22 saves / 23 shots); Antoine Samuel (0 saves / 0 shots)		Goalie stats	Éric Brassard (30 saves / 35 shots); Kevin Resop (8 saves / 9 shots)

April 7	Shawinigan Cataractes	2 – 3	OT	Halifax Mooseheads	Centre Bionest de Shawinigan	Recap
1:00 - Dennis Yan (7)		First period		Maxime Fortier (2) - 3:03
No scoring		Second period		No scoring
2:43 - Olivier Caouette (1)		Third period		Philippe Gadoury (1) - 17:57
No scoring		First overtime period		Nikolaj Ehlers (2) - 16:59
Marvin Cupper (44 saves / 47 shots)		Goalie stats		Éric Brassard (36 saves / 38 shots)

Halifax wins series 4 – 3

=== (6) Val-d'Or Foreurs vs. (11) Rouyn-Noranda Huskies ===
March 27	Val-d'Or Foreurs	6 – 2	Rouyn-Noranda Huskies	Centre Air Creebec	Recap
10:22 - pp - Nicolas Aubé-Kubel (1); 18:34 - Olivier Galipeau (1); 18:42 - Anthony Richard (1)		First period	Ryan Penny (1) - 8:57; Justin Guénette (1) - pp - 17:43
5:07 - pp - Pierre-Maxime Poudrier (1); 19:58 - Simon Tremblay (1)		Second period	No scoring
2:48 - Nathan Tremblay (1)		Third period	No scoring
Étienne Montpetit (27 saves / 29 shots)		Goalie stats	Jérémy Bélisle (15 saves / 18 shots); Samuel Harvey (25 saves / 28 shots)

March 28	Val-d'Or Foreurs	3 – 8	Rouyn-Noranda Huskies	Centre Air Creebec	Recap
No scoring		First period	Alexandre Fortin (1) - 19:45
10:38 - Anthony Richard (2); 14:52 - Simon Tremblay (2)		Second period	Francis Perron (1) - sh - 0:44; Redgie Bois (1) - pp - 3:53; Francis Perron (2) - 17:58
7:56 - William Gignac (1)		Third period	J.C. Beaudin (1) - 3:29; Ryan Penny (2) - 5:32; Ryan Penny (3) - sh - 6:27; Julien Nantel (1) - pp - 11:57
Étienne Montpetit (28 saves / 34 shots); Keven Bouchard (13 saves / 15 shots)		Goalie stats	Samuel Harvey (27 saves / 30 shots)

March 31	Rouyn-Noranda Huskies	2 – 6	Val-d'Or Foreurs	Aréna Iamgold	Recap
No scoring		First period	William Gignac (2) - 9:29; Julien Gauthier (1) - 11:33
15:58 - pp - Mathieu Lemay (1)		Second period	Pierre-Maxime Poudrier (2) - 10:25
7:59 - pp - Ryan Penny (4)		Third period	Simon Tremblay (3) - 0:42; Julien Gauthier (2) - pp - 3:24; Julien Gauthier (3) - pp - 19:28
Samuel Harvey (27 saves / 33 shots)		Goalie stats	Étienne Montpetit (27 saves / 29 shots)

April 1	Rouyn-Noranda Huskies	2 – 1	Val-d'Or Foreurs	Aréna Iamgold	Recap
No scoring		First period	No scoring
9:36 - pp - Alexandre Fortin (2)		Second period	Shawn St-Amant (1) - 6:32
6:19 - Julien Nantel (2)		Third period	No scoring
Samuel Harvey (36 saves / 37 shots)		Goalie stats	Keven Bouchard (31 saves / 33 shots)

April 3	Val-d'Or Foreurs	5 – 4	OT	Rouyn-Noranda Huskies	Centre Air Creebec	Recap
No scoring		First period		Mathieu Lemay (2) - pp - 3:18
0:42 - sh - Simon Tremblay (4); 10:39 - Anthony Beauregard (1)		Second period		Alexandre Fortin (3) - 3:22; Alexandre Fortin (4) - 15:17
9:20 - pp - Jérémie Fraser (1); 16:07 - pp - Jérémie Fraser (2)		Third period		Francis Perron (3) - sh - 8:17
2:07 - Anthony Beauregard (2)		First overtime period		No scoring
Étienne Montpetit (12 saves / 16 shots)		Goalie stats		Samuel Harvey (30 saves / 35 shots)

April 5	Rouyn-Noranda Huskies	2 – 9	Val-d'Or Foreurs	Aréna Iamgold	Recap
16:54 - pp - Julien Nantel (3)		First period	Pierre-Maxime Poudrier (3) - 13:07
No scoring		Second period	Nicolas Aubé-Kubel (2) - sh - 1:47; Nicolas Aubé-Kubel (3) - 9:27; Alexis Pépin (1) - 11:06; Anthony Richard (3) - pp - 12:38; Anthony Richard (4) - 15:59
13:40 - Mathieu Lemay (3)		Third period	Shawn St-Amant (2) - 1:40; Nicolas Aubé-Kubel (4) - sh - 5:08; William Gignac (3) - 11:47
Samuel Harvey (29 saves / 35 shots)		Goalie stats	Étienne Montpetit (26 saves / 28 shots)

Val-d'Or wins series 4 – 2

=== (7) Baie-Comeau Drakkar vs. (10) Saint John Sea Dogs ===
March 27	Baie-Comeau Drakkar	3 – 1	Saint John Sea Dogs	Centre Henry-Leonard	Recap
No scoring		First period	No scoring
12:20 - Jasmin Boutet (1); 17:54 - Nicolas Meloche (1)		Second period	Luke Green (1) - pp - 2:49
19:05 - Jasmin Boutet (2)		Third period	No scoring
Philippe Cadorette (26 saves / 27 shots)		Goalie stats	Sébastien Auger (24 saves / 27 shots)

March 28	Baie-Comeau Drakkar	4 – 1	Saint John Sea Dogs	Centre Henry-Leonard	Recap
No scoring		First period	No scoring
8:08 - pp - Nicolas Meloche (2); 15:02 - Simon Desbiens (1)		Second period	No scoring
5:55 - Maxime St-Cyr (1); 19:57 - en - Anthony Beauchamp (1)		Third period	Nathan Noel (1) - pp - 7:33
Philippe Cadorette (24 saves / 25 shots)		Goalie stats	Sébastien Auger (33 saves / 36 shots)

March 31	Saint John Sea Dogs	5 – 6	Baie-Comeau Drakkar	Harbour Station	Recap
No scoring		First period	No scoring
1:54 - Mark Tremaine (1); 18:06 - Adam Bateman (1)		Second period	Nicolas Meloche (3) - pp - 8:10; Václav Karabáček (1) - 13:35
14:15 - Samuel Dove-McFalls (1); 18:18 - Spencer Smallman (1); 19:47 - Mathieu Joseph (1)		Third period	Simon Desbiens (2) - 2:29; Maxime St-Cyr (2) - 11:55; Mathieu Desautels (1) - 13:03; Jérémy Grégoire (1) - 15:35
Sébastien Auger (34 saves / 40 shots)		Goalie stats	Philippe Cadorette (36 saves / 41 shots)

April 2	Saint John Sea Dogs	4 – 2	Baie-Comeau Drakkar	Harbour Station	Recap
11:42 - pp - Daniel Del Paggio (1)		First period	Dzmitry Ambrozheichik (1) - 1:22; Jasmin Boutet (3) - 1:41
2:36 - Nathan Noel (2)		Second period	No scoring
0:26 - pp - Jakub Zbořil (1); 19:52 - pp - en - Mark Tremaine (2)		Third period	No scoring
Sébastien Auger (31 saves / 33 shots)		Goalie stats	Philippe Cadorette (24 saves / 27 shots)

April 4	Saint John Sea Dogs	4 – 7	Baie-Comeau Drakkar	Harbour Station	Recap
Nathan Noel (3) - pp - 17:34		First period	3:18 - Jérémy Grégoire (2); 8:30 - Luca Ciampini (1); 16:06 - Maxime St-Cyr (3)
Mark Tremaine (3) - pp - 9:30; Nathan Noel (4) - 17:37		Second period	1:28 - pp - Jérémy Grégoire (3); 11:41 - pp - Maxime St-Cyr (4); 12:08 - pp - Václav Karabáček (2)
Nathan Noel (5) - 18:28		Third period	2:42 - pp - Maxime St-Cyr (5)
Sébastien Auger (38 saves / 45 shots)		Goalie stats	Philippe Cadorette (18 saves / 22 shots)

Baie-Comeau wins series 4 – 1

=== (8) Sherbrooke Phoenix vs. (9) Charlottetown Islanders ===
March 27	Sherbrooke Phoenix	2 – 8	Charlottetown Islanders	Palais des Sports	Recap
No scoring		First period	No scoring
16:02 - Carl Neill (1)		Second period	Spenser Cobbold (1) - 5:08; Spenser Cobbold (2) - 7:36; Daniel Sprong (1) - pp - 10:02; Mitchell Balmas (1) - 11:32; Daniel Sprong (2) - 12:37; Oliver Cooper (1) - 14:23; Luc Deschênes (1) - 16:47; Filip Rydström (1) - 18:49
13:59 - pp - Tim Wieser (1)		Third period	No scoring
Alex Bureau (12 saves / 17 shots); Evan Fitzpatrick (9 saves / 12 shots)		Goalie stats	Mason McDonald (30 saves / 32 shots)

March 28	Sherbrooke Phoenix	7 – 3	Charlottetown Islanders	Palais des Sports	Recap
5:46 - Cameron Darcy (1); 13:08 - Daniel Audette (1)		First period	No scoring
14:21 - pp - Cameron Darcy (2); 18:15 - pp - Daniel Audette (2)		Second period	Daniel Sprong (3) - pp - 6:23
4:36 - Cameron Darcy (3); 12:17 - pp - Kay Schweri (1); 19:30 - en - David Storto (1)		Third period	Spenser Cobbold (3) - 2:28; Luc Deschênes (2) - pp - 14:02
Evan Fitzpatrick (25 saves / 28 shots)		Goalie stats	Mason McDonald (24 saves / 30 shots)

March 30	Charlottetown Islanders	5 – 2	Sherbrooke Phoenix	Eastlink Centre	Recap
2:09 - Guillaume Rioux-Legault (1); 3:47 - Brad Kennedy (1); 8:49 - Kameron Kielly (1)		First period	No scoring
16:50 - Daniel Sprong (4)		Second period	Cameron Darcy (4) - 6:48; Cameron Darcy (5) - 9:09
11:09 - Spenser Cobbold (4)		Third period	No scoring
Mason McDonald (4 saves / 4 shots); Daryl MacCallum (30 saves / 32 shots)		Goalie stats	Evan Fitzpatrick (30 saves / 35 shots)

April 1	Charlottetown Islanders	1 – 2	Sherbrooke Phoenix	Eastlink Centre	Recap
No scoring		First period	Jeremy Roy (1) - pp - 1:16
16:39 - pp - Luc Deschênes (3)		Second period	Tim Wieser (2) - pp - 15:06
No scoring		Third period	No scoring
Daryl MacCallum (29 saves / 31 shots)		Goalie stats	Alex Bureau (38 saves / 39 shots)

April 3	Charlottetown Islanders	4 – 0	Sherbrooke Phoenix	Eastlink Centre	Recap
Oliver Cooper (2) - 4:16; Spenser Cobbold (5) - 14:50		First period	No scoring
No scoring		Second period	No scoring
Ross Johnston (1) - 1:25; Brad Kennedy (2) - 3:11		Third period	No scoring
Daryl MacCallum (43 saves / 43 shots)		Goalie stats	Alex Bureau (36 saves / 40 shots)

April 6	Sherbrooke Phoenix	3 – 4	OT	Charlottetown Islanders	Palais des Sports	Recap
David Storto (2) - 15:46		First period		No scoring
David Storto (3) - 12:39		Second period		10:18 - Alexandre Goulet (1); 10:58 - Filip Rydström (2)
Nicolas Poulin (1) - 9:25		Third period		11:22 - Guillaume Rioux-Legault (2)
No scoring		First overtime period		13:34 - Spenser Cobbold (6)
Alex Bureau (29 saves / 33 shots)		Goalie stats		Daryl MacCallum (36 saves / 39 shots)

Charlottetown wins series 4 – 2

== Quarter-finals ==
=== (1) Rimouski Océanic vs. (14) Gatineau Olympiques ===
April 10	Rimouski Océanic	1 – 2	Gatineau Olympiques	Colisée de Rimouski	Recap
5:24 - Christopher Clapperton (5)		First period	Élie Bérubé (2) - 1:19
No scoring		Second period	Tommy Veilleux (1) - pp - 15:43
No scoring		Third period	No scoring
Philippe Desrosiers (28 saves / 30 shots)		Goalie stats	François Brassard (26 saves / 27 shots)

April 11	Rimouski Océanic	3 – 1	Gatineau Olympiques	Colisée de Rimouski	Recap
4:07 - pp - Christopher Clapperton (6)		First period	No scoring
No scoring		Second period	Joey Richard (3) - 10:54
12:42 - Frédérik Gauthier (1); 19:43 - en - Deven St-Hilaire (3)		Third period	No scoring
Philippe Desrosiers (28 saves / 29 shots)		Goalie stats	François Brassard (29 saves / 31 shots)

April 14	Gatineau Olympiques	2 – 5	Rimouski Océanic	Robert Guertin Centre	Recap
3:32 - pp - Yakov Trenin (3); 5:45 - Yan Pavel Laplante (1)		First period	Jan Košťálek (3) - pp - 17:04; Christopher Clapperton (7) - pp - 19:58
No scoring		Second period	Michael Joly (4) - 19:24; Christopher Clapperton (8) - 19:39
No scoring		Third period	Anthony DeLuca (4) - pp - 11:12
François Brassard (22 saves / 27 shots)		Goalie stats	Philippe Desrosiers (2 saves / 4 shots); Louis-Philip Guindon (20 saves / 20 shots)

April 15	Gatineau Olympiques	0 – 3	Rimouski Océanic	Robert Guertin Centre	Recap
No scoring		First period	No scoring
No scoring		Second period	Tyler Boland (1) - 2:26; Anthony Chapados (3) - 4:21
No scoring		Third period	Alexis Loiseau (3) - en - 17:21
François Brassard (10 saves / 12 shots); Nicolas Lachance (21 saves / 21 shots)		Goalie stats	Louis-Philip Guindon (26 saves / 26 shots)

April 17	Gatineau Olympiques	1 – 4	Rimouski Océanic	Robert Guertin Centre	Recap
Tommy Veilleux (2) - 5:17		First period	7:52 - pp - Jan Košťálek (4)
No scoring		Second period	2:45 - Christopher Clapperton (9)
No scoring		Third period	1:12 - Michael Joly (5); 5:09 - Michael Joly (6)
François Brassard (14 saves / 18 shots)		Goalie stats	Louis-Philip Guindon (15 saves / 16 shots)

Rimouski won series 4 – 1

=== (2) Moncton Wildcats vs. (12) Halifax Mooseheads ===
April 10	Moncton Wildcats	3 – 7	Halifax Mooseheads	Moncton Coliseum	Recap
2:45 - Ivan Barbashev (4)		First period	Danny Moynihan (6) - pp - 7:09; Nikolaj Ehlers (3) - 14:22
12:02 - Ivan Barbashev (5)		Second period	Nikolaj Ehlers (4) - 4:56; Philippe Gadoury (2) - 7:18; Andrew Shewfelt (1) - 15:01
10:44 - Kyle Tibbo (2)		Third period	Nikolaj Ehlers (5) - 0:32; Nikolaj Ehlers (6) - sh - en - 18:33
Alex Dubeau (16 saves / 22 shots); Jason Rioux (10 saves / 10 shots)		Goalie stats	Éric Brassard (34 saves / 37 shots)

April 11	Moncton Wildcats	3 – 6	Halifax Mooseheads	Moncton Coliseum	Recap
No scoring		First period	Timo Meier (6) - pp - 8:50; Maxime Fortier (3) - 17:42
4:51 - Stephen Johnson (5); 9:39 - Bronson Beaton (1)		Second period	Vincent Watt (1) - 3:14; Timo Meier (7) - 8:35; Maxime Fortier (4) - 10:46
8:36 - Adam Holwell (1)		Third period	Vincent Watt (2) - en - 17:49
Alex Dubeau (24 saves / 29 shots)		Goalie stats	Éric Brassard (40 saves / 43 shots)

April 14	Halifax Mooseheads	3 – 4	Moncton Wildcats	Scotiabank Centre	Recap
10:19 - pp - Danny Moynihan (7)		First period	Jacob Sweeney (3) - 0:25; Ivan Barbashev (6) - pp - 5:49; Ivan Barbashev (7) - pp - 17:21
7:39 - pp - Nikolaj Ehlers (7)		Second period	No scoring
4:04 - Nikolaj Ehlers (8)		Third period	Dominic Talbot-Tassi (1) - pp - 4:59
Éric Brassard (18 saves / 22 shots)		Goalie stats	Alex Dubeau (26 saves / 29 shots)

April 15	Halifax Mooseheads	2 – 3	OT	Moncton Wildcats	Scotiabank Centre	Recap
No scoring		First period		Dominic Talbot-Tassi (2) - 12:45; Jacob Sweeney (4) - 19:49
17:10 - Timo Meier (8); 18:25 - Kelly Bent (1)		Second period		No scoring
No scoring		Third period		No scoring
No scoring		First overtime period		Taylor Burke (2) - 16:20
Éric Brassard (37 saves / 40 shots)		Goalie stats		Alex Dubeau (35 saves / 37 shots)

April 17	Moncton Wildcats	7 – 3	Halifax Mooseheads	Moncton Coliseum	Recap
1:48 - Ivan Barbashev (8); 4:19 - Stephen Johnson (6); 12:38 - Zack MacEwen (1)		First period	No scoring
No scoring		Second period	Timo Meier (9) - pp - 9:19
3:09 - Ivan Barbashev (9); 9:38 - Cameron Askew (1); 12:51 - pp - Ivan Barbashev (10); 16:07 - pp - Ivan Barbashev (11)		Third period	Kelly Bent (2) - 2:23; Ryan Falkenham (4) - 3:30
Alex Dubeau (22 saves / 25 shots)		Goalie stats	Éric Brassard (36 saves / 43 shots)

April 19	Halifax Mooseheads	7 – 5	Moncton Wildcats	Scotiabank Centre	Recap
5:49 - Brandon Vuic (1); 8:07 - Timo Meier (10); 8:52 - Vincent Watt (3); 13:26 - pp - Nikolaj Ehlers (9)		First period	No scoring
10:30 - Brandon Vuic (2)		Second period	Bronson Beaton (2) - 13:52; Lane Cormier (1) - 16:50
0:17 - Nikolaj Ehlers (10)		Third period	Lane Cormier (2) - 3:01; Jacob Sweeney (5) - pp - 14:41; Conor Garland (2) - 18:17
Éric Brassard (43 saves / 48 shots)		Goalie stats	Alex Dubeau (10 saves / 15 shots); Jason Rioux (17 saves / 19 shots)

April 21	Moncton Wildcats	6 – 3	Halifax Mooseheads	Moncton Coliseum	Recap
19:20 - Ivan Barbashev (12)		First period	No scoring
3:52 - Cameron Askew (2); 12:53 - pp - Zack MacEwen (2); 17:05 - Stephen Johnson (7)		Second period	Danny Moynihan (8) - 7:18
7:01 - pp - Dominic Talbot-Tassi (3); 19:07 - Stephen Johnson (8)		Third period	Danny Moynihan (9) - pp - 1:51; Connor Moynihan (1) - 17:19
Alex Dubeau (25 saves / 28 shots)		Goalie stats	Éric Brassard (33 saves / 38 shots)

Moncton won series 4 – 3

=== (4) Quebec Remparts vs. (9) Charlottetown Islanders ===
April 10	Quebec Remparts	7 – 2	Charlottetown Islanders	Colisée Pepsi	Recap
10:53 - Adam Erne (7); 11:14 - Anthony Duclair (2); 16:04 - Ross MacDougall (1)		First period	No scoring
2:13 - Jérome Verrier (4); 4:06 - Adam Erne (8); 5:44 - Vladimir Tkachev (2)		Second period	No scoring
7:26 - Vladimir Tkachev (3)		Third period	Filip Chlapík (1) - 8:31; Alexandre Goulet (2) - pp - 14:24
Zachary Fucale (29 saves / 31 shots)		Goalie stats	Daryl MacCallum (19 saves / 26 shots)

April 12	Quebec Remparts	4 – 3	OT	Charlottetown Islanders	Colisée Pepsi	Recap
5:50 - pp - Adam Erne (9); 19:31 - Marc-Olivier Roy (2)		First period		Ross Johnston (2) - 7:45
No scoring		Second period		Bradley Kennedy (3) - 14:31
12:04 - Marc-Olivier Roy (3)		Third period		Ross Johnston (3) - 18:51
16:19 - Adam Erne (10)		First overtime period		No scoring
Zachary Fucale (32 saves / 35 shots)		Goalie stats		Daryl MacCallum (48 saves / 52 shots)

April 14	Charlottetown Islanders	2 – 5	Quebec Remparts	Eastlink Centre	Recap
5:47 - pp - Daniel Sprong (5)		First period	Jérome Verrier (5) - pp - 10:44; Jérome Verrier (6) - 14:19
19:58 - pp - Daniel Sprong (6)		Second period	Matt Murphy (2) - 2:57; Adam Erne (11) - 15:38
No scoring		Third period	Guillaume Gauthier (3) - 13:32
Daryl MacCallum (34 saves / 39 shots)		Goalie stats	Zachary Fucale (30 saves / 32 shots)

April 16	Charlottetown Islanders	2 – 5	Quebec Remparts	Eastlink Centre	Recap
2:33 - pp - Ross Johnston (4)		First period	Raphaël Maheux (2) - pp - 8:51
18:49 - pp - Daniel Sprong (7)		Second period	Guillaume Gauthier (4) - 4:49; Guillaume Gauthier (5) - 10:04
No scoring		Third period	Guillaume Gauthier (6) - 2:30; Matt Murphy (3) - en - 19:19
Daryl MacCallum (36 saves / 40 shots)		Goalie stats	Zachary Fucale (27 saves / 29 shots)

Quebec won series 4 – 0

=== (6) Val-d'Or Foreurs vs. (7) Baie-Comeau Drakkar ===
April 10	Val-d'Or Foreurs	2 – 3	2OT	Baie-Comeau Drakkar	Centre Air Creebec	Recap
No scoring		First period		Jérémy Grégoire (4) - 6:21
5:43 - sh - Jan Mandát (1)		Second period		Václav Karabáček (3) - 19:20
9:55 - Simon Tremblay (5)		Third period		No scoring
No scoring		Second overtime period		Simon Chevrier (1) - 0:41
Étienne Montpetit (30 saves / 33 shots)		Goalie stats		Philippe Cadorette (61 saves / 63 shots)

April 11	Val-d'Or Foreurs	1 – 9	Baie-Comeau Drakkar	Centre Air Creebec	Recap
8:07 - Anthony Richard (5)		First period	Jérémy Grégoire (5) - 10:08; Jérémy Grégoire (6) - 15:17
No scoring		Second period	Maxime St-Cyr (6) - 5:04; Mathieu Desautels (2) - 10:18; Frédéric Gamelin (1) - 10:56; Jérémy Grégoire (7) - pp - 13:01; Luca Ciampini (2) - pp - 15:36
No scoring		Third period	Luca Ciampini (3) - 3:37; Maxime St-Cyr (7) - sh - 8:32
Keven Bouchard (13 saves / 17 shots); Étienne Montpetit (10 saves / 15 shots)		Goalie stats	Philippe Cadorette (35 saves / 36 shots)

April 14	Baie-Comeau Drakkar	6 – 3	Val-d'Or Foreurs	Centre Henry-Leonard	Recap
3:36 - Jérémy Grégoire (8)		First period	Anthony Beauregard (3) - 3:57
4:56 - Nicolas Meloche (4); 8:01 - pp - Jasmin Boutet (4); 9:37 - pp - Maxime St-Cyr (8); 11:23 - pp - Maxime St-Cyr (9)		Second period	Nicolas Aubé-Kubel (5) - 3:16; Anthony Richard (6) - sh - 7:40
15:49 - sh - Frédéric Gamelin (2)		Third period	No scoring
Philippe Cadorette (23 saves / 26 shots)		Goalie stats	Étienne Montpetit (33 saves / 39 shots)

April 15	Baie-Comeau Drakkar	3 – 4	2OT	Val-d'Or Foreurs	Centre Henry-Leonard	Recap
5:54 - Maxime St-Cyr (10); 10:58 - pp - Maxime St-Cyr (11); 17:45 - Luca Ciampini (4)		First period		No scoring
No scoring		Second period		Alexis Pépin (2) - 14:05; Anthony Richard (7) - 16:46
No scoring		Third period		Simon Tremblay (6) - 2:27
No scoring		Second overtime period		Julien Gauthier (4) - pp - 10:00
Philippe Cadorette (48 saves / 52 shots)		Goalie stats		Étienne Montpetit (38 saves / 41 shots)

April 17	Baie-Comeau Drakkar	2 – 5	Val-d'Or Foreurs	Centre Henry-Leonard	Recap
Frédéric Gamelin (3) - pp - 11:01		First period	16:23 - pp - Anthony Beauregard (4)
No scoring		Second period	1:31 - Anthony Richard (8); 2:23 - Alexis Pépin (3); 16:13 - pp - Anthony Beauregard (5); 19:23 - pp - Julien Gauthier (5)
Maxime St-Cyr (12) - 17:40		Third period	No scoring
Philippe Cadorette (27 saves / 32 shots)		Goalie stats	Étienne Montpetit (26 saves / 28 shots)

April 20	Val-d'Or Foreurs	4 – 2	Baie-Comeau Drakkar	Centre Air Creebec	Recap
Simon Tremblay (7) - 2:13		First period	No scoring
Anthony Richard (9) - 1:50; Shawn St-Amant (3) - 6:46; Jan Mandát (2) - pp - 8:50		Second period	19:30 - pp - Dmitry Ambrozheichik (2)
No scoring		Third period	6:54 - Jérémy Grégoire (9)
Étienne Montpetit (29 saves / 31 shots)		Goalie stats	Philippe Cadorette (34 saves / 38 shots)

April 21	Val-d'Or Foreurs	4 – 3	OT	Baie-Comeau Drakkar	Centre Air Creebec	Recap
7:30 - Pierre-Maxime Poudrier (4)		First period		Frédéric Gamelin (4) - 8:01; Jérémy Grégoire (10) - 16:58; Václav Karabáček (4) - 19:06
No scoring		Second period		No scoring
4:29 - sh - Pierre-Maxime Poudrier (5); 12:31 - Shawn St-Amant (4)		Third period		No scoring
4:18 - Alexis Pépin (4)		First overtime period		No scoring
Étienne Montpetit (23 saves / 26 shots)		Goalie stats		Philippe Cadorette (35 saves / 39 shots)

Val-d'Or won series 4 – 3

== Semi-finals ==
=== (1) Rimouski Océanic vs. (6) Val-d'Or Foreurs ===
April 24	Rimouski Océanic	4 – 3	OT	Val-d'Or Foreurs	Colisée de Rimouski	Recap
7:19 - Andrew Picco (1); 19:31 - Anthony DeLuca (5)		First period		Anthony Richard (10) - 14:31
No scoring		Second period		Shawn Ouellette-St-Amant (5) - 2:48
18:55 - Anthony DeLuca (6)		Third period		Pierre-Maxime Poudrier (6) - 6:21
1:50 - pp - Anthony DeLuca (7)		First overtime period		No scoring
Louis-Philip Guindon (19 saves / 22 shots)		Goalie stats		Étienne Montpetit (29 saves / 33 shots)

April 25	Rimouski Océanic	3 – 0	Val-d'Or Foreurs	Colisée de Rimouski	Recap
No scoring		First period	No scoring
6:25 - Deven St-Hilaire (4); 16:31 - pp - Anthony DeLuca (8); 18:10 - Michael Joly (7)		Second period	No scoring
No scoring		Third period	No scoring
Louis-Philip Guindon (19 saves / 19 shots)		Goalie stats	Étienne Montpetit (41 saves / 44 shots)

April 28	Val-d'Or Foreurs	2 – 4	Rimouski Océanic	Centre Air Creebec	Recap
No scoring		First period	Tyler Boland (2) - pp - 17:50
19:13 - sh - Anthony Richard (11)		Second period	Alexis Loiseau (4) - sh - 15:35; Anthony DeLuca (9) - pp - 19:57
15:17 - Anthony Richard (12)		Third period	Alexis Loiseau (5) - en - 19:26
Étienne Montpetit (32 saves / 35 shots)		Goalie stats	Louis-Philip Guindon (26 saves / 28 shots)

April 29	Val-d'Or Foreurs	0 – 6	Rimouski Océanic	Centre Air Creebec	Recap
No scoring		First period	0:13 - Anthony Chapados (4); 12:34 - Tyler Boland (3)
No scoring		Second period	2:20 - William Couture (1); 9:11 - pp - Anthony DeLuca (10); 9:26 - pp - Anthony Chapados (5); 9:38 - Deven St-Hilaire (5)
No scoring		Third period	No scoring
Étienne Montpetit (15 saves / 20 shots); Keven Bouchard (12 saves / 13 shots)		Goalie stats	Louis-Philip Guindon (30 saves / 30 shots)

Rimouski won series 4 – 0

=== (2) Moncton Wildcats vs. (4) Quebec Remparts ===
April 23	Moncton Wildcats	1 – 4	Quebec Remparts	Moncton Coliseum	Recap
16:17 - Kyle Tibbo (3)		First period	No scoring
No scoring		Second period	Vladimir Tkachev (4) - pp - 11:01
No scoring		Third period	Anthony Duclair (3) - 1:17; Vladimir Tkachev (5) - pp - 8:33; Anthony Duclair (4) - 15:28
Alex Dubeau (40 saves / 44 shots)		Goalie stats	Zachary Fucale (26 saves / 27 shots)

April 25	Moncton Wildcats	3 – 4	Quebec Remparts	Moncton Coliseum	Recap
1:57 - pp - Ivan Barbashev (13); 17:09 - Conor Garland (3)		First period	Ryan Graves (4) - 11:32
No scoring		Second period	Yanick Turcotte (1) - 4:08; Adam Erne (12) - 5:13
2:15 - Taylor Burke (3)		Third period	Guillaume Gauthier (7) - 14:23
Alex Dubeau (28 saves / 32 shots)		Goalie stats	Zachary Fucale (29 saves / 32 shots)

April 27	Quebec Remparts	5 – 1	Moncton Wildcats	Colisée Pepsi	Recap
1:05 - Ryan Graves (5)		First period	No scoring
16:43 - Adam Erne (13)		Second period	No scoring
0:22 - Massimo Carozza (2); 10:41 - Kurt Etchegary (2); 18:36 - en - Zach Moody (1)		Third period	Kyle Tibbo (4) - 11:16
Zachary Fucale (24 saves / 25 shots)		Goalie stats	Alex Dubeau (16 saves / 20 shots)

April 28	Quebec Remparts	7 – 0	Moncton Wildcats	Colisée Pepsi	Recap
1:13 - Adam Erne (14); 3:52 - Anthony Duclair (5); 6:36 - Adam Erne (15); 16:56 - pp - Kurt Etchegary (3); 18:42 - Kurt Etchegary (4)		First period	No scoring
1:00 - Kurt Etchegary (5)		Second period	No scoring
5:01 - Vladimir Tkachev (6)		Third period	No scoring
Zachary Fucale (25 saves / 25 shots)		Goalie stats	Alex Dubeau (23 saves / 30 shots)

Quebec won series 4 – 0

== President's Cup Finals ==
=== (1) Rimouski Océanic vs. (4) Quebec Remparts ===
May 5	Rimouski Océanic	4 – 7	Quebec Remparts	Colisée de Rimouski	Recap
1:01 - Michael Joly (8); 3:52 - Michael Joly (9)		First period	Massimo Carozza (3) - 2:16; Anthony Duclair (6) - 11:16
No scoring		Second period	Adam Erne (16) - 0:24; Matt Murphy (4) - pp - 4:03
1:40 - Anthony DeLuca (11); 14:24 - Michael Joly (10)		Third period	Raphaël Maheux (3) - 6:23; Kurt Etchegary (6) - 18:03; Anthony Duclair (7) - en - 19:57
Louis-Philip Guindon (15 saves / 19 shots); Philippe Desrosiers (16 saves / 18 shots)		Goalie stats	Zachary Fucale (25 saves / 29 shots)

May 8	Rimouski Océanic	1 – 4	Quebec Remparts	Colisée de Rimouski	Recap
No scoring		First period	Adam Erne (17) - 2:07; Kurt Etchegary (7) - sh - 2:37; Matt Murphy (5) - 13:27
4:58 - Christopher Clapperton (10)		Second period	Anthony Duclair (8) - 15:38
No scoring		Third period	No scoring
Philippe Desrosiers (4 saves / 7 shots); Louis-Philip Guindon (22 saves / 23 shots)		Goalie stats	Zachary Fucale (40 saves / 41 shots)

May 10	Quebec Remparts	2 – 4	Rimouski Océanic	Colisée Pepsi	Recap
8:37 - Guillaume Gauthier (8)		First period	Alexis Loiseau (6) - pp - 16:44
No scoring		Second period	Samuel Laberge (1) - 2:32; Michael Joly (11) - 12:46
8:13 - Olivier Garneau (1)		Third period	Samuel Laberge (2) - pp - 10:31
Zachary Fucale (29 saves / 33 shots)		Goalie stats	Louis-Philip Guindon (26 saves / 28 shots)

May 13	Quebec Remparts	2 – 4	Rimouski Océanic	Colisée Pepsi	Recap
4:10 - pp - Kurt Etchegary (8); 7:49 - pp - Nikolas Brouillard (2)		First period	Alexis Loiseau (7) - pp - 10:53; Jan Košťálek (5) - 19:57
No scoring		Second period	Frédérik Gauthier (2) - 5:30; Guillaume McSween (1) - 12:07
No scoring		Third period	No scoring
Zachary Fucale (8 saves / 12 shots); Callum Booth (9 saves / 9 shots)		Goalie stats	Louis-Philip Guindon (21 saves / 23 shots)

May 15	Rimouski Océanic	2 – 3	OT	Quebec Remparts	Colisée de Rimouski	Recap
No scoring		First period		Adam Erne (18) - pp - 5:26
4:06 - pp - Christopher Clapperton (11); 8:04 - Jan Košťálek (6)		Second period		No scoring
No scoring		Third period		Adam Erne (19) - 13:01
No scoring		First overtime period		Massimo Carozza (4) - 0:10
Louis-Philip Guindon (23 saves / 26 shots)		Goalie stats		Zachary Fucale (34 saves / 36 shots)

May 17	Quebec Remparts	4 – 5	OT	Rimouski Océanic	Colisée Pepsi	Recap
18:33 - Massimo Carozza (5); 19:18 - Adam Erne (20)		First period		No scoring
6:54 - Matt Murphy (6); 7:16 - Adam Erne (21)		Second period		Jan Košťálek (7) - 1:23; Alexis Loiseau (8) - 14:14
No scoring		Third period		Samuel Laberge (3) - 9:32; Alexis Loiseau (9) - 18:59
No scoring		First overtime period		Jan Košťálek (8) - 1:03
Zachary Fucale (35 saves / 40 shots)		Goalie stats		Louis-Philip Guindon (8 saves / 11 shots); Philippe Desrosiers (6 saves / 7 shots)

May 18	Rimouski Océanic	2 – 1	2OT	Quebec Remparts	Colisée de Rimouski	Recap
12:00 - pp - Christopher Clapperton (12)		First period		Nikolas Brouillard (3) - pp - 15:40
No scoring		Second period		No scoring
No scoring		Third period		No scoring
2:13 - pp - Michael Joly (12)		Second overtime period		No scoring
Philippe Desrosiers (47 saves / 48 shots)		Goalie stats		Zachary Fucale (32 saves / 34 shots)

Rimouski won series 4 – 3

== Playoff scoring leaders ==
Note: GP = Games played; G = Goals; A = Assists; Pts = Points; PIM = Penalty minutes

Player	Team	GP	G	A	Pts	PIM
Nikolaj Ehlers	Halifax Mooseheads	14	10	21	31	14
Adam Erne	Quebec Remparts	22	21	9	30	17
Alexis Loiseau	Rimouski Océanic	20	9	17	26	8
Anthony Duclair	Quebec Remparts	22	8	18	26	18
Kurt Etchegary	Quebec Remparts	22	8	18	26	12
Christopher Clapperton	Rimouski Océanic	18	12	13	25	20
Conor Garland	Moncton Wildcats	16	3	22	25	17
Ivan Barbashev	Moncton Wildcats	16	13	11	24	14
Anthony Richard	Val-d'Or Foreurs	17	12	10	22	10
Michael Joly	Rimouski Océanic	20	12	9	21	20
Jérémy Grégoire	Baie-Comeau Drakkar	12	10	11	21	18
Timo Meier	Halifax Mooseheads	14	10	11	21	18
Jan Košťálek	Rimouski Océanic	20	8	13	21	10

== Playoff leading goaltenders ==
Note: GP = Games played; Mins = Minutes played; W = Wins; L = Losses: OTL = Overtime losses; SL = Shootout losses; GA = Goals Allowed; SO = Shutouts; GAA = Goals against average

Player	Team	GP	Mins	W	L	GA	SO	Sv%	GAA
Louis-Philip Guindon	Rimouski Océanic	15	813	11	1	25	3	.926	1.84
Samuel Montembeault	Blainville-Boisbriand Armada	6	352	2	4	14	0	.878	2.38
Marvin Cupper	Shawinigan Cataractes	7	475	3	4	19	0	.929	2.40
Philippe Desrosiers	Rimouski Océanic	9	411	5	3	17	0	.910	2.48
Francois Brassard	Gatineau Olympiques	11	599	5	6	25	1	.911	2.50

== Trophies and awards ==
- President's Cup - Playoff Champions: Rimouski Océanic
- Jean Rougeau Trophy - Regular Season Champions: Rimouski Océanic
- Luc Robitaille Trophy - Team with the best goals for average: Moncton Wildcats
- Robert Lebel Trophy - Team with best GAA: Blainville-Boisbriand Armada

Player

- Michel Brière Memorial Trophy - Most Valuable Player: Conor Garland, Moncton Wildcats
- Jean Béliveau Trophy - Top Scorer: Conor Garland, Moncton Wildcats
- Guy Lafleur Trophy - Playoff MVP: Adam Erne, Quebec Remparts
- Jacques Plante Memorial Trophy - Top Goaltender: Philippe Desrosiers, Rimouski Océanic
- Guy Carbonneau Trophy - Best Defensive Forward: Frédérik Gauthier, Rimouski Océanic
- Emile Bouchard Trophy - Defenceman of the Year: Jan Košťálek, Rimouski Océanic
- Kevin Lowe Trophy - Best Defensive Defenceman: Jan Košťálek, Rimouski Oceanic
- Michael Bossy Trophy - Top Prospect: Timo Meier, Halifax Mooseheads
- RDS Cup - Rookie of the Year: Dmytro Timashov, Quebec Remparts
- Michel Bergeron Trophy - Offensive Rookie of the Year: Dmytro Timashov, Quebec Remparts
- Raymond Lagacé Trophy - Defensive Rookie of the Year: Samuel Girard, Shawinigan Cataractes
- Frank J. Selke Memorial Trophy - Most sportsmanlike player: Kyle Farrell, Cape Breton Screaming Eagles
- QMJHL Humanitarian of the Year - Humanitarian of the Year: Danick Martel, Blainville-Boisbriand Armada
- Marcel Robert Trophy - Best Scholastic Player: Jérémy Grégoire, Baie-Comeau Drakkar
- Paul Dumont Trophy - Personality of the Year: Nikolaj Ehlers, Halifax Mooseheads

Executive

- Ron Lapointe Trophy - Coach of the Year: Joël Bouchard, Blainville-Boisbriand Armada
- Maurice Filion Trophy - General Manager of the Year: Martin Moudou, Shawinigan Cataractes
- John Horman Trophy - Executive of the Year: Johnathan Doiron, Charlottetown Islanders
- Jean Sawyer Trophy - Marketing Director of the Year: Saint John Sea Dogs

=== All-Star teams ===
First All-Star Team:

- Marvin Cupper, Goaltender, Shawinigan Cataractes
- Jan Košťálek, Defenceman, Rimouski Océanic
- Daniel Walcott, Defenceman, Blainville-Boisbriand Armada
- Danick Martel, Centre, Blainville-Boisbriand Armada
- Nikolaj Ehlers, Left Wing, Halifax Mooseheads
- Conor Garland, Right Wing, Moncton Wildcats

Second All-Star Team:

- Philippe Cadorette, Goaltender, Baie-Comeau Drakkar
- Nikolas Brouillard, Defenceman, Quebec Remparts
- Alexandre Carrier, Defenceman, Gatineau Olympiques
- Anthony Beauvillier, Centre, Shawinigan Cataractes
- Nikita Jevpalovs, Left Wing, Blainville-Boisbriand Armada
- Timo Meier, Right Wing, Halifax Mooseheads

All-Rookie Team:

- Evan Fitzpatrick, Goaltender, Sherbrooke Phoenix
- Samuel Girard, Defenceman, Shawinigan Cataractes
- Jakub Zbořil, Defenceman, Saint John Sea Dogs
- Filip Chlapík, Centre, Charlottetown Islanders
- Dmytro Timashov, Left Wing, Quebec Remparts
- Evgeny Svechnikov, Right Wing, Cape Breton Screaming Eagles

== See also ==
- List of QMJHL seasons
- 2014 in ice hockey
- 2014–15 OHL season
- 2014–15 WHL season
- 2015 in ice hockey
- 2015 Memorial Cup

Preceded by 2013–14 QMJHL season	QMJHL seasons	Succeeded by 2015–16 QMJHL season
