= Marvin Cupper =

German ice hockey player

Marvin Cüpper
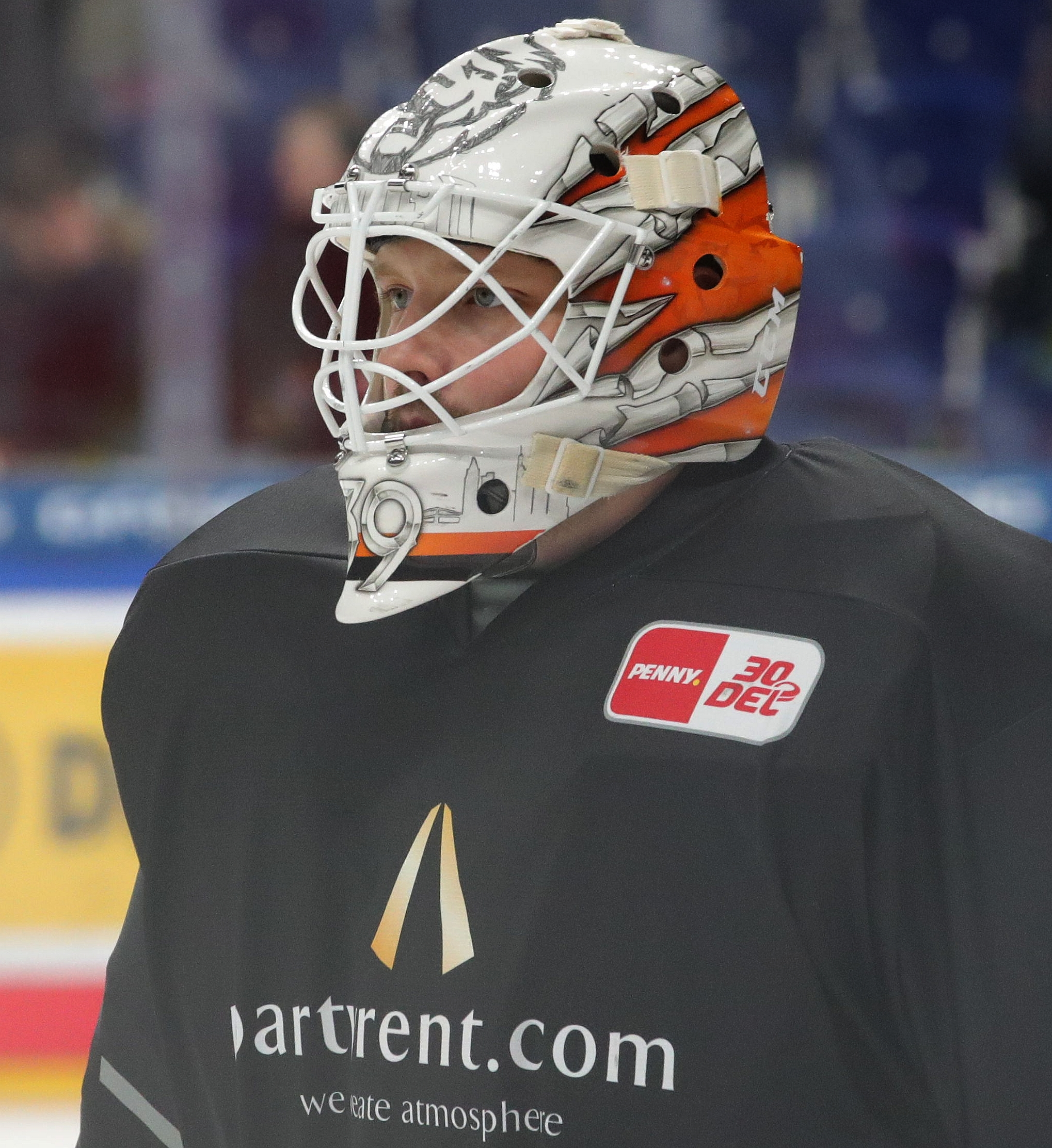
- Cüpper in 2023
- Born: 16 February 1994 (age 32) Cologne, Germany
- Height: 5 ft 10 in (178 cm)
- Weight: 181 lb (82 kg; 12 st 13 lb)
- Position: Goaltender
- Catches: Left
- DEL team Former teams: Löwen Frankfurt; Eisbären Berlin; Krefeld Pinguine; Schwenninger Wild Wings
- NHL draft: Undrafted
- Playing career: 2012–present

Marvin Cüpper (born 16 February 1994) is a German professional ice hockey goaltender. He is currently playing with Löwen Frankfurt of the Deutsche Eishockey Liga (DEL).

== Playing career ==
During the 2014–15 season while playing with the Shawinigan Cataractes of the Quebec Major Junior Hockey League, Cupper was named to the QMJHL First All-Star Team.

Undrafted after three seasons as the starting goaltender of the Cataractes, Cupper returned to his native Germany to launch his professional career in signing a three-year contract with Eisbären Berlin of the DEL on 16 July 2015.

Cupper remained within the Eisbären Berlin organization for five seasons before leaving as a free agent to sign a one-year deal with Krefeld Pinguine on 18 April 2020.

At the conclusion of his contract with Schwenninger Wild Wings, Cupper left as a free agent to sign a one-year contract with Löwen Frankfurt, on 9 June 2023.

== Awards and honours ==
Honours	Year
QMJHL First Team All Star	2014–15
