= Ross Johnston =

Canadian ice hockey player (born 1994)

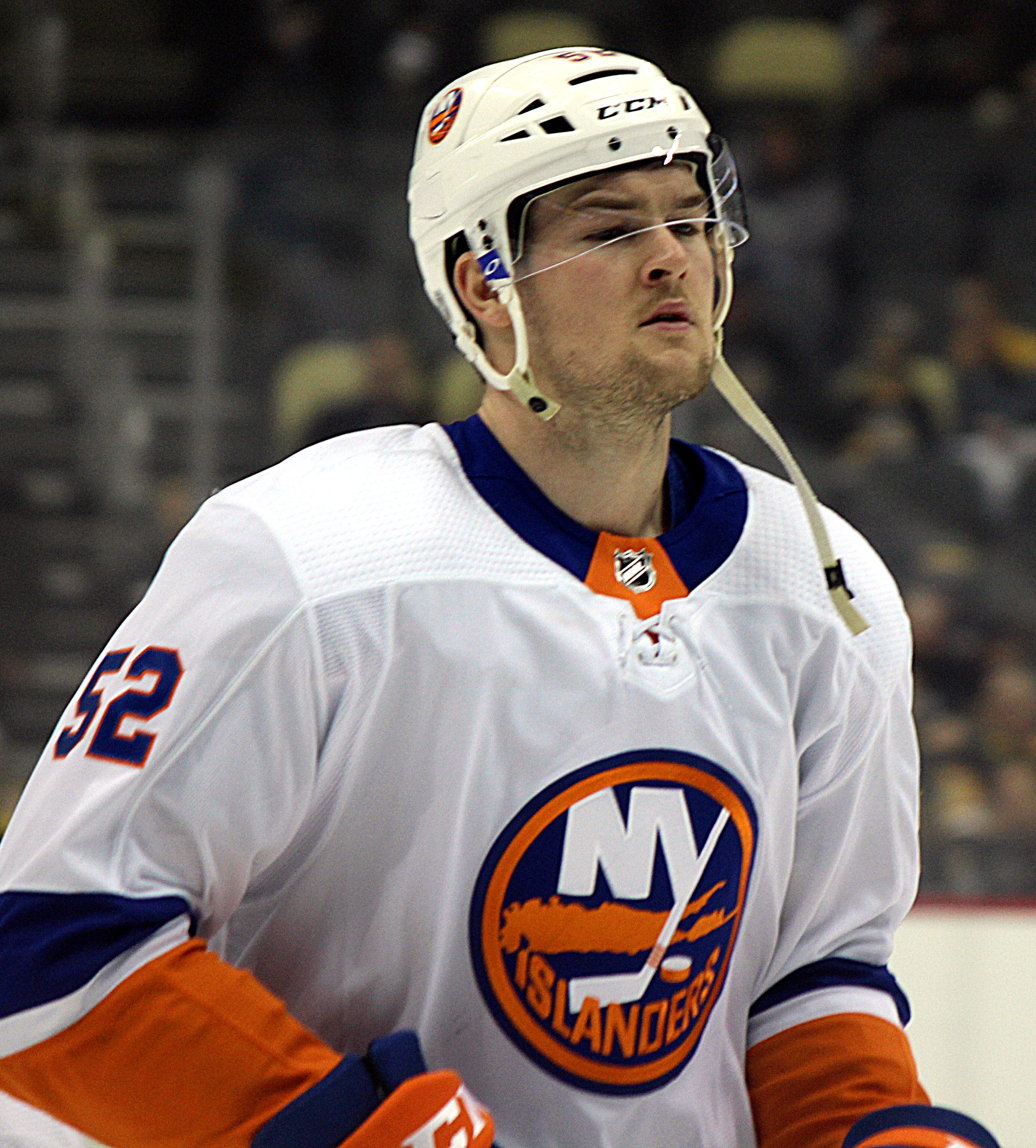
- Johnston with the New York Islanders in 2018
- Born: February 18, 1994 (age 32) Charlottetown, Prince Edward Island, Canada
- Height: 6 ft 5 in (196 cm)
- Weight: 232 lb (105 kg; 16 st 8 lb)
- Position: Forward
- Shoots: Left
- NHL team Former teams: St. Louis Blues; New York Islanders; Anaheim Ducks
- NHL draft: Undrafted
- Playing career: 2015–present

Ross Johnston (born February 18, 1994) is a Canadian professional ice hockey player who is a forward for the St. Louis Blues of the National Hockey League (NHL). He previously played for the New York Islanders and Anaheim Ducks.

== Playing career ==
Johnston played junior ice hockey starting in the MHL with the Summerside Western Capitals before graduating to play three seasons in the Quebec Major Junior Hockey League (QMJHL) with the Moncton Wildcats, Victoriaville Tigres and Charlottetown Islanders. He went undrafted by teams in the National Hockey League (NHL). As a free agent, he attended the NHL's New York Islanders training camp in 2014, but had his jaw broken in a fight. Due to the injury, he missed two months of his final season with Charlottetown.

=== New York Islanders ===
On March 31, 2015, Johnston was signed to a three-year, entry-level contract with the New York Islanders. At the end of the 2015–16 season, his first professional year, Johnston split his time between the Islanders' American Hockey League (AHL) affiliate, the Bridgeport Sound Tigers and the Missouri Mavericks of the ECHL. He was recalled by the Islanders and made his NHL debut on April 10, 2016. He returned to the AHL for the 2016–17 season and started the 2017–18 season with the Sound Tigers. Johnston was recalled on January 19, 2018, to replace the injured Casey Cizikas. He recorded his first NHL point on January 21, assisting on a goal by Brock Nelson in the third period of a 7–3 win against the Chicago Blackhawks. He recorded his first NHL goal on January 25, against the Vegas Golden Knights to help the Islanders win 2–1. Johnston finished the season appearing in 24 games with the Islanders recording three goals and six points.

As a restricted free agent, Johnston agreed to a four-year contract extension with the Islanders on July 9, 2018. On October 26, 2021, Johnston signed a four-year contract extension with the Islanders.

Johnston made the Islanders 2023–24 season opening roster on October 9, 2023, but was placed on waivers on October 10.

=== Anaheim Ducks ===
On October 10, 2023, Joshnton was claimed off waivers by the Anaheim Ducks. He made his Ducks debut on opening night, October 14, against the Vegas Golden Knights.

=== St. Louis Blues ===
As a free agent following his third season with the Ducks, Johnston was signed to a three-year, $6 million contract with the St. Louis Blues on July 1, 2026.

== Personal life ==
Johnston was raised on his family's beef farm in Suffolk, Prince Edward Island. He has one older brother, Will, and a sister, Katherine.

== Career statistics ==
| | | | Regular season | | | | | Playoffs |
| Season | Team | League | GP | G | A | Pts | PIM | GP | G | A | Pts | PIM |
|---|---|---|---|---|---|---|---|---|---|---|---|---|
| 2010–11 | Summerside Western Capitals | MJHL | 2 | 2 | 1 | 3 | 4 | — | — | — | — | — |
| 2011–12 | Summerside Western Capitals | MJHL | 23 | 12 | 17 | 29 | 55 | — | — | — | — | — |
| 2011–12 | Moncton Wildcats | QMJHL | 38 | 2 | 5 | 7 | 55 | 2 | 0 | 0 | 0 | 8 |
| 2012–13 | Moncton Wildcats | QMJHL | 53 | 12 | 15 | 27 | 96 | 3 | 0 | 0 | 0 | 4 |
| 2013–14 | Victoriaville Tigres | QMJHL | 60 | 10 | 15 | 25 | 139 | 5 | 0 | 3 | 3 | 6 |
| 2014–15 | Charlottetown Islanders | QMJHL | 44 | 18 | 14 | 32 | 124 | 10 | 4 | 7 | 11 | 28 |
| 2014–15 | Bridgeport Sound Tigers | AHL | 2 | 0 | 0 | 0 | 0 | — | — | — | — | — |
| 2015–16 | Bridgeport Sound Tigers | AHL | 39 | 1 | 3 | 4 | 79 | — | — | — | — | — |
| 2015–16 | Missouri Mavericks | ECHL | 13 | 4 | 7 | 11 | 23 | 5 | 3 | 1 | 4 | 10 |
| 2015–16 | New York Islanders | NHL | 1 | 0 | 0 | 0 | 4 | — | — | — | — | — |
| 2016–17 | Bridgeport Sound Tigers | AHL | 62 | 8 | 7 | 15 | 135 | — | — | — | — | — |
| 2017–18 | Bridgeport Sound Tigers | AHL | 38 | 3 | 8 | 11 | 113 | — | — | — | — | — |
| 2017–18 | New York Islanders | NHL | 24 | 3 | 3 | 6 | 62 | — | — | — | — | — |
| 2018–19 | New York Islanders | NHL | 17 | 1 | 3 | 4 | 23 | — | — | — | — | — |
| 2019–20 | New York Islanders | NHL | 32 | 3 | 1 | 4 | 78 | 5 | 0 | 0 | 0 | 12 |
| 2020–21 | New York Islanders | NHL | 12 | 0 | 1 | 1 | 35 | — | — | — | — | — |
| 2021–22 | New York Islanders | NHL | 32 | 2 | 5 | 7 | 44 | — | — | — | — | — |
| 2022–23 | New York Islanders | NHL | 16 | 0 | 2 | 2 | 37 | — | — | — | — | — |
| 2023–24 | Anaheim Ducks | NHL | 68 | 1 | 3 | 4 | 117 | — | — | — | — | — |
| 2024–25 | Anaheim Ducks | NHL | 43 | 1 | 3 | 4 | 72 | — | — | — | — | — |
| 2025–26 | Anaheim Ducks | NHL | 62 | 3 | 11 | 14 | 107 | 5 | 0 | 0 | 0 | 4 |
| NHL totals | | | 307 | 14 | 32 | 46 | 579 | 10 | 0 | 0 | 0 | 16 |
