= Danick Martel =

Canadian ice hockey player

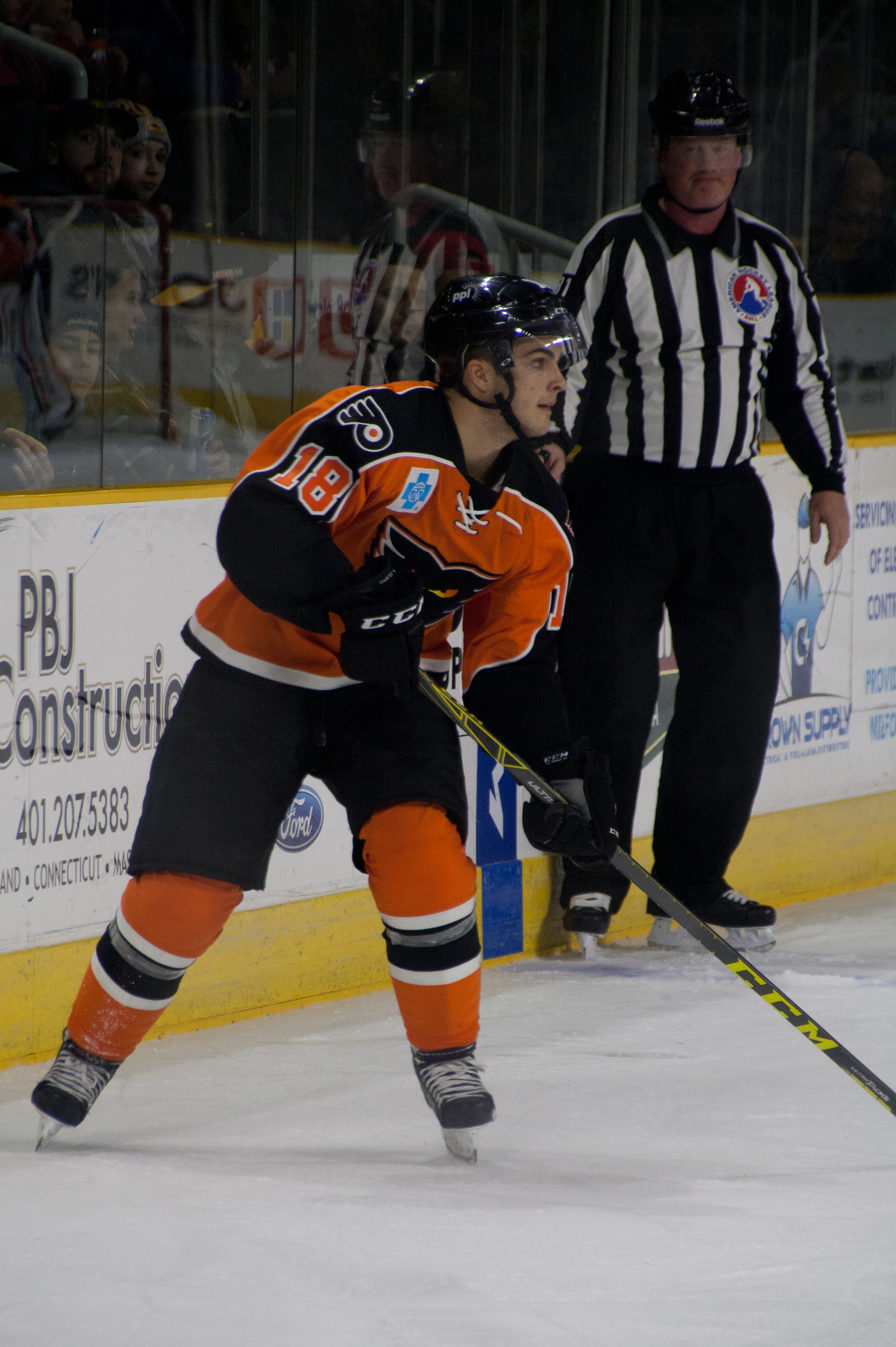
- Martel with the Lehigh Valley Phantoms in 2015
- Born: December 12, 1994 (age 31) Drummondville, Quebec, Canada
- Height: 5 ft 8 in (173 cm)
- Weight: 162 lb (73 kg; 11 st 8 lb)
- Position: Left wing
- Shoots: Left
- Liiga team Former teams: HPK; Philadelphia Flyers; Tampa Bay Lightning
- NHL draft: Undrafted
- Playing career: 2015–present

Danick Martel (born December 12, 1994) is a Canadian professional ice hockey forward who is currently playing under contract with HPK in the Liiga. He has previously played in the NHL for the Philadelphia Flyers and Tampa Bay Lightning.

== Playing career ==
As a youth, Martel played in the 2007 Quebec International Pee-Wee Hockey Tournament with the Drummondville Voltigeurs minor ice hockey team.

During the 2014–15 season, while playing with the Quebec Major Junior Hockey League (QMJHL)'s Blainville-Boisbriand Armada, Martel scored 48 goals and 54 assists, and was named to the QMJHL First All-Star Team. He was further honoured when he was named the 2014–15 CHL Humanitarian of the Year.

Unselected in any NHL entry draft, Martel signed a three-year, entry-level contract with the Philadelphia Flyers on March 10, 2015. He signed an amateur try-out with the Flyers' American Hockey League (AHL) affiliate, the Lehigh Valley Phantoms, on April 11, 2015.

In the 2017–18 season, Martel began his fourth season with the Phantoms and was leading the team and AHL with 14 goals in 17 games before earning his first call-up to the Flyers on November 22, 2017. He made his NHL debut that night against the New York Islanders, and would play three more games after that before being sent back to the AHL. In January 2018, Martel was selected for the 2018 AHL All-Star game; however, due to an injury, he was replaced by Oskar Lindblom. Nearing the end of the 2017–18 season, Martel was named the Phantoms' 2017–18 IOA/American Specialty AHL Man of the Year for his work in the community.

On September 22, 2018, Martel was claimed off waivers by the Tampa Bay Lightning. In the 2018–19 season, on December 18, 2018, in a 5–2 win over the Vancouver Canucks, Martel scored his first NHL career point, assisting on a goal scored by Cédric Paquette. Primarily serving as the Lightning's reserve forward on the roster, Martel served as healthy scratch to appear in just 9 regular season games for 2 goals.

On July 4, 2019, Martel was re-signed to a one-year, two-way contract extension with the Lightning. In the following 2019–20 season, Martel cleared waivers and continued in the AHL with the Syracuse Crunch, collecting 30 points in 52 games. On February 20, 2020, Martel was traded by the Lightning to the Florida Panthers in exchange for Anthony Greco.

As a free agent from the Panthers, Martel was unable to attract an NHL deal before signing a one-year AHL contract with the Binghamton Devils, affiliate to the New Jersey Devils, on January 9, 2021. In the pandemic delayed and shortened 2020–21 season, Martel added 6 goals and 14 points through 24 regular season games for Binghamton.

With Binghamton ceasing operations, Martel as a free agent signed a one-year AHL contract with hometown provincial club, the Laval Rocket, on 3 July 2021.

Martel played with the Rocket for two seasons before leaving North America as a free agent to sign a one-year contract with Finnish club, HPK of the Liiga, on July 31, 2023.

== Career statistics ==
			Regular season					Playoffs
Season	Team	League	GP	G	A	Pts	PIM	GP	G	A	Pts	PIM
2010–11	Magog Cantonniers	QMAAA	41	10	8	18	60	13	7	4	11	8
2011–12	Magog Cantonniers	QMAAA	41	23	29	52	83	7	6	3	9	10
2011–12	Blainville-Boisbriand Armada	QMJHL	1	0	0	0	0	—	—	—	—	—
2012–13	Blainville-Boisbriand Armada	QMJHL	68	19	22	41	50	15	3	4	7	16
2013–14	Blainville-Boisbriand Armada	QMJHL	63	32	28	60	42	11	8	1	9	8
2014–15	Blainville-Boisbriand Armada	QMJHL	64	48	54	102	85	6	4	3	7	8
2014–15	Lehigh Valley Phantoms	AHL	5	1	2	3	4	—	—	—	—	—
2015–16	Lehigh Valley Phantoms	AHL	67	22	15	37	68	—	—	—	—	—
2016–17	Lehigh Valley Phantoms	AHL	68	20	20	40	67	5	1	0	1	4
2017–18	Lehigh Valley Phantoms	AHL	59	25	15	40	50	13	4	4	8	22
2017–18	Philadelphia Flyers	NHL	4	0	0	0	0	—	—	—	—	—
2018–19	Syracuse Crunch	AHL	4	0	1	1	6	—	—	—	—	—
2018–19	Tampa Bay Lightning	NHL	9	0	2	2	8	—	—	—	—	—
2019–20	Syracuse Crunch	AHL	52	16	14	30	42	—	—	—	—	—
2019–20	Springfield Thunderbirds	AHL	8	4	5	9	17	—	—	—	—	—
2020–21	Binghamton Devils	AHL	24	6	8	14	44	—	—	—	—	—
2021–22	Laval Rocket	AHL	70	17	16	33	82	15	9	6	15	44
2022–23	Laval Rocket	AHL	26	4	8	12	15	1	0	0	0	0
NHL totals			13	0	2	2	8	—	—	—	—	—

== Awards and honours ==
Award	Year
QMJHL
First Team All Star	2015
Humanitarian of the Year	2015
CHL Humanitarian of the Year	2015
AHL
IOA/American Specialty AHL Man of the Year	2018
