= Philippe Desrosiers =

Canadian ice hockey player (born 1995)

- Born: August 16, 1995 (age 30) Saint-Hyacinthe, Quebec, Canada
- Height: 6 ft 1 in (185 cm)
- Weight: 190 lb (86 kg; 13 st 8 lb)
- Position: Goaltender
- Catches: Left
- LNAH team Former teams: Sorel-Tracy Éperviers; Texas Stars; Springfield Thunderbirds; Manitoba Moose; Laval Rocket
- NHL draft: 54th overall, 2013; Dallas Stars
- Playing career: 2015–present

Philippe Desrosiers (born August 16, 1995) is a Canadian professional ice hockey goaltender. He is currently playing with Sorel-Tracy Éperviers of the Ligue Nord-Américaine de Hockey (LNAH). Desrosiers was selected by the Dallas Stars in the second round (54th overall) of the 2013 NHL entry draft.

== Playing career ==
Desrosiers played with the Rimouski Océanic of the Quebec Major Junior Hockey League (QMJHL) from 2012 to 2015. Following his first full season with Rimouski Océanic, he was awarded the Raymond Lagacé Trophy as the QMJHL Defensive Rookie of the Year. He was also named to the 2012–13 QMJHL All-Rookie Team. On April 19, 2014, the Dallas Stars of the National Hockey League signed Desrosiers to three-year entry-level contract, but he was returned to the Rimouski Océanic for the 2014–15 QMJHL season where, in his final year of major junior hockey, he was recognized for his outstanding play when he posted the QMJHL Best GAA of 2.50 to win the Jacques Plante Memorial Trophy and was selected as the 2014–15 CHL Goaltender of the Year.

After four seasons within the Stars organization, Desrosiers was not tendered a qualifying offer and was released as a free agent on June 25, 2019. He was signed to a one-year, two-way contract with the Florida Panthers on July 2, 2019. He was assigned to AHL affiliate, the Springfield Thunderbirds for the 2019–20 season, appearing in 29 regular season games and posting a 16-10-2 record, before signing a one-year contract extension with the Panthers on October 15, 2020.

In the following pandemic-delayed 2020–21 season, Desrosiers spent the entirety of the year on the Panthers' extended taxi squad, without featuring in a game.

As a free agent from the Panthers, Desrosiers opted to continue his career in the AHL by agreeing to a one-year contract with the Manitoba Moose, the primary affiliate of the Winnipeg Jets, on August 17, 2021. On March 19, 2022, Desrosiers signed a one year, two-way contract with the Winnipeg Jets.

Having concluded his contract with the Jets, Desrosiers continued his career in the AHL by signing a one-year deal with the Laval Rocket, affiliate to the Montreal Canadiens, on July 17, 2022.

== Career statistics ==
=== Regular season and playoffs ===
			Regular season									Playoffs
Season	Team	League	GP	W	L	OT	MIN	GA	SO	GAA	SV%	GP	W	L	MIN	GA	SO	GAA	SV%
2010–11	Collège Antoine-Girouard Gaulois	QMAAA	20	—	—	—	—	—	—	3.55	.885	3	—	—	—	—	—	3.45	.907
2011–12	Collège Antoine-Girouard Gaulois	QMAAA	23	—	—	—	—	—	—	2.77	.907	11	—	—	—	—	—	2.59	.905
2011–12	Rimouski Océanic	QMJHL	3	1	2	0	155	9	0	3.09	.918	—	—	—	—	—	—	—	—
2012–13	Rimouski Océanic	QMJHL	43	22	8	5	2305	118	1	3.07	.900	4	2	2	239	9	0	2.26	.892
2013–14	Rimouski Océanic	QMJHL	52	31	14	7	2921	129	5	2.65	.907	11	7	3	640	25	2	2.34	.917
2014–15	Rimouski Océanic	QMJHL	44	29	9	3	2469	103	5	2.50	.901	9	5	3	411	17	0	2.48	.910
2015–16	Idaho Steelheads	ECHL	31	15	7	6	1744	68	2	2.34	.913	7	3	4	390	16	0	2.47	.923
2015–16	Texas Stars	AHL	10	5	5	0	596	28	0	2.82	.903	—	—	—	—	—	—	—	—
2016–17	Texas Stars	AHL	8	3	2	0	373	17	1	2.73	.910	—	—	—	—	—	—	—	—
2016–17	Idaho Steelheads	ECHL	13	5	3	2	678	43	0	3.81	.893	—	—	—	—	—	—	—	—
2016–17	Norfolk Admirals	ECHL	20	8	11	0	1156	72	0	3.74	.902	—	—	—	—	—	—	—	—
2017–18	Idaho Steelheads	ECHL	36	23	9	3	2106	88	2	2.51	.913	10	4	5	571	19	0	2.00	.934
2017–18	Texas Stars	AHL	2	1	0	0	70	1	0	0.86	.962	—	—	—	—	—	—	—	—
2018–19	Idaho Steelheads	ECHL	6	2	3	1	370	17	0	2.76	.911	—	—	—	—	—	—	—	—
2018–19	Texas Stars	AHL	23	8	11	1	1298	55	1	2.54	.910	—	—	—	—	—	—	—	—
2019–20	Springfield Thunderbirds	AHL	29	16	10	2	1712	87	0	3.05	.916	—	—	—	—	—	—	—	—
2021–22	Trois-Rivières Lions	ECHL	34	19	13	1	1983	102	3	3.09	.902	7	3	4	411	28	0	4.08	.880
2021–22	Manitoba Moose	AHL	4	2	1	0	189	8	0	2.54	.909	—	—	—	—	—	—	—	—
2022–23	Trois-Rivières Lions	ECHL	28	7	15	3	1543	86	0	3.34	.889	—	—	—	—	—	—	—	—
2022–23	Laval Rocket	AHL	2	0	1	1	115	9	0	4.70	.836	—	—	—	—	—	—	—	—
AHL totals			78	35	30	4	4,353	205	2	2.82	.911	—	—	—	—	—	—	—	—

=== International ===
Year	Team	Event	Result	GP	W	L	OT	MIN	GA	SO	GAA	SV%
2013	Canada	U18	1st place, gold medalist(s)	5	5	0	0	300	4	2	0.80	.970
Junior totals				5	5	0	0	300	4	2	0.80	.970

== Awards and honours ==
Award	Year
QMAAA
Best Goalie Prospect	2012
First All-Star Team	2012
QMJHL
CHL/NHL Top Prospects Game	2013
All-Rookie Team	2012–13
Raymond Lagacé Trophy - QMJHL Defensive Rookie of the Year	2012–13
Jacques Plante Memorial Trophy – QMJHL Best Goals Against Average (2.50)	2014–15
CHL Goaltender of the Year	2014–15
