= Jan Košťálek =

Czech ice hockey player (born 1995)

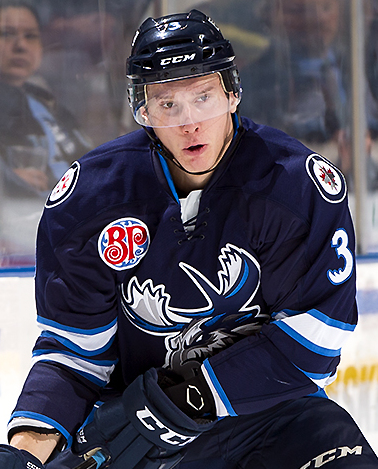
- Košťálek with the Manitoba Moose in 2015
- Born: 17 February 1995 (age 31) Prague, Czech Republic
- Height: 6 ft 0 in (183 cm)
- Weight: 176 lb (80 kg; 12 st 8 lb)
- Position: Defence
- Shoots: Right
- ELH team Former teams: HC Dynamo Pardubice; HC Sparta Praha; Manitoba Moose; HC Vítkovice
- National team: Czech Republic
- NHL draft: 114th overall, 2013; Winnipeg Jets
- Playing career: 2012–present

Jan Košťálek (born 17 February 1995) is a Czech professional ice hockey defenceman. He is currently playing with HC Dynamo Pardubice of the Czech Extraliga (ELH). Košťálek was selected by the Winnipeg Jets in the 4th round (114th overall) of the 2013 NHL entry draft.

== Playing career ==
=== Amateur ===
Košťálek made his Czech Extraliga debut playing with HC Sparta Praha during the 2011–12 Czech Extraliga season. In 2014–15, Košťálek was instrumental in leading Rimouski to the 2015 Memorial Cup, as the team defeated the Quebec Remparts in seven games, to win the QMJHL Championship. Košťálek was awarded the Kevin Lowe Trophy, for being chosen the best defensive defenseman in the QMJHL. Kostalek was also awarded the Emile Bouchard Trophy, being named defenseman of the year.

=== Professional ===
During his third North American junior season with Rimouski in 2014–15, Košťálek was signed to a three-year entry-level contract with the Winnipeg Jets on 19 March 2015. On 9 October, Kostalek made his North American professional ice hockey debut, with the Manitoba Moose.

Unable to make progress within the Winnipeg Jets organization during his entry-level contract, Košťálek as a restricted free agent opted to return to his native Czech Republic, rejoining former club HC Sparta Praha of the Extraliga on July 2, 2018.

== Career statistics ==
=== Regular season and playoffs ===
			Regular season					Playoffs
Season	Team	League	GP	G	A	Pts	PIM	GP	G	A	Pts	PIM
2010–11	HC Sparta Praha	CZE U18	39	2	9	11	34	5	0	0	0	8
2010–11	HC Sparta Praha	CZE U20	1	0	0	0	0	—	—	—	—	—
2011–12	HC Sparta Praha	CZE U18	7	0	13	13	12	3	1	3	4	2
2011–12	HC Sparta Praha	CZE U20	32	3	4	7	30	4	0	0	0	2
2011–12	HC Sparta Praha	ELH	10	0	0	0	4	—	—	—	—	—
2012–13	Rimouski Océanic	QMJHL	48	5	13	18	53	6	0	1	1	2
2013–14	Rimouski Océanic	QMJHL	55	5	22	27	40	6	0	3	3	4
2014–15	Rimouski Océanic	QMJHL	57	7	36	43	35	20	8	13	21	10
2015–16	Manitoba Moose	AHL	52	1	8	9	20	—	—	—	—	—
2016–17	Manitoba Moose	AHL	60	2	5	7	20	—	—	—	—	—
2017–18	Manitoba Moose	AHL	37	6	1	7	16	9	2	0	2	8
2017–18	Jacksonville Icemen	ECHL	8	2	1	3	2	—	—	—	—	—
2018–19	HC Sparta Praha	ELH	40	6	10	16	48	4	0	1	1	4
2019–20	HC Sparta Praha	ELH	47	14	11	25	68	—	—	—	—	—
2020–21	HC Sparta Praha	ELH	48	11	15	26	14	11	4	4	8	6
2021–22	HC Dynamo Pardubice	ELH	53	8	33	41	30	7	0	4	4	0
2022–23	HC Dynamo Pardubice	ELH	42	7	23	30	36	11	1	4	5	4
2023–24	HC Dynamo Pardubice	ELH	44	6	17	23	12	16	1	7	8	10
2024–25	HC Vítkovice	ELH	51	4	15	19	14	5	0	1	1	6
ELH totals			335	56	124	180	226	54	6	21	27	30

=== International ===
Year	Team	Event	Result	GP	G	A	Pts	PIM
2011	Czech Republic	IH18	6th	4	0	0	0	0
2012	Czech Republic	U17	8th	5	0	1	1	6
2012	Czech Republic	U18	8th	6	0	1	1	6
2013	Czech Republic	U18	7th	5	0	2	2	2
2014	Czech Republic	WJC	6th	6	0	1	1	2
2015	Czech Republic	WJC	6th	5	1	2	3	34
2023	Czech Republic	WC	8th	8	1	3	4	2
Junior totals				30	1	7	8	50
Senior totals				8	1	3	4	2

== Awards and honours ==
Award	Year
QMJHL
Kevin Lowe Trophy	2014–15
Emile Bouchard Trophy	2014–15
First All-Star Team	2014–15
