= Nicolas Meloche =

Canadian ice hockey player (born 1997)

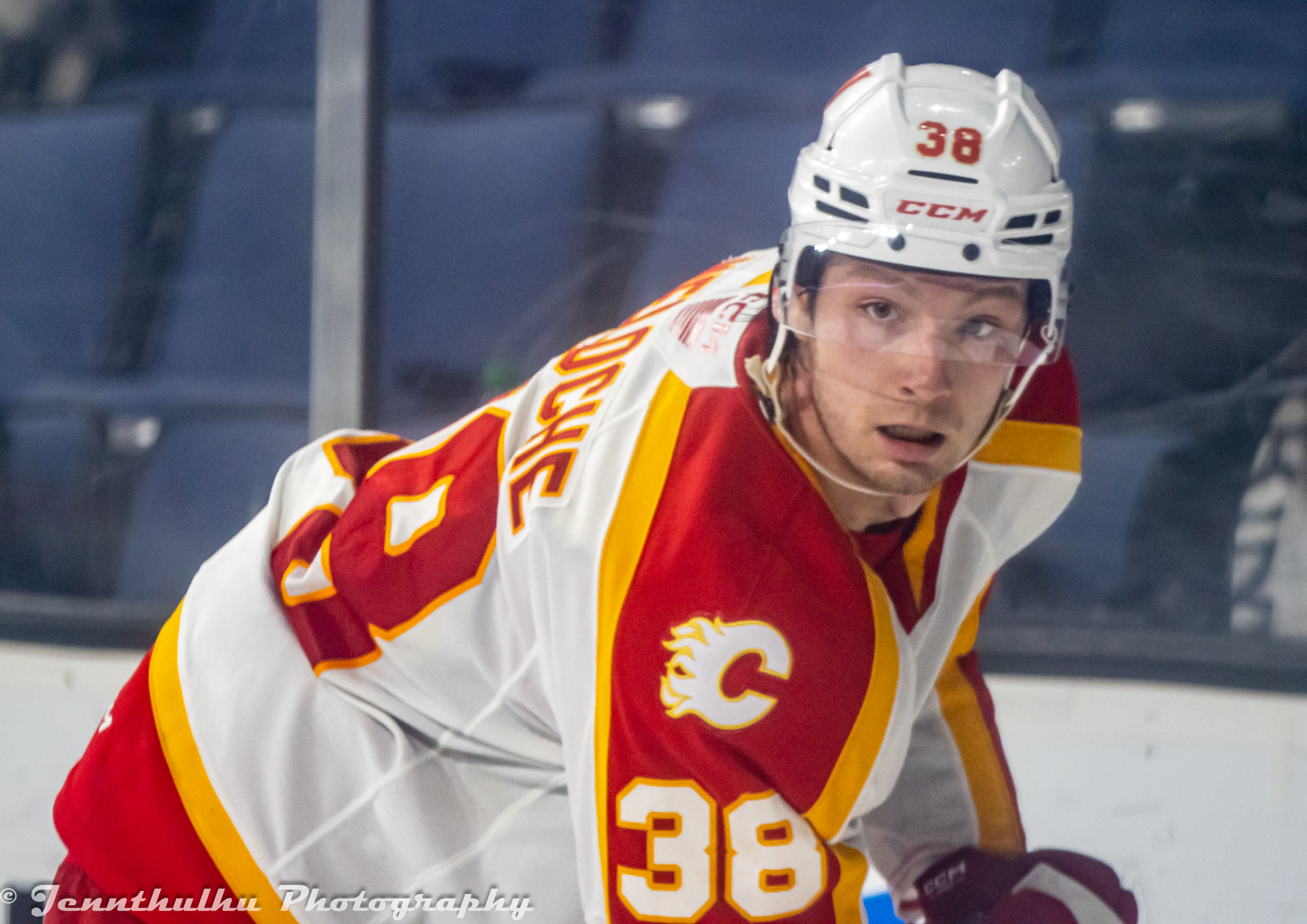
- Meloche with the Calgary Wranglers in 2023
- Born: July 18, 1997 (age 29) LaSalle, Quebec, Canada
- Height: 6 ft 3 in (191 cm)
- Weight: 203 lb (92 kg; 14 st 7 lb)
- Position: Defence
- Shoots: Right
- KHL team Former teams: Dinamo Minsk; San Jose Sharks; Salavat Yulaev Ufa
- NHL draft: 40th overall, 2015; Colorado Avalanche
- Playing career: 2017–present

Nicolas Meloche (born July 18, 1997) is a Canadian professional ice hockey defenceman who is currently playing for HC Dinamo Minsk of the Kontinental Hockey League (KHL). Meloche was selected 40th overall by the Colorado Avalanche in the 2015 NHL entry draft.

== Playing career ==
Meloche was drafted by the Baie-Comeau Drakkar in the 1st round (15th overall) of the 2013 QMJHL Entry Draft. During his first season with Baie-Comeau, Meloche scored 25 points in 54 games to set a franchise record for most points by a rookie defenceman, and his outstanding play was recognized when he was named to the 2013–14 QMJHL All-Rookie Team.

The following season he was chosen to play with the Canada men's national under-18 ice hockey team at the 2014 Ivan Hlinka Memorial Tournament where he helped Canada win the gold medal. Meloche was also named to the play with the QMJHL All-Stars at the 2014 Subway Super Series, and was selected to participate in the 2015 CHL/NHL Top Prospects Game.

Originally rated as a top prospect who was projected to be a possible first round selection in the 2015 NHL entry draft. Meloche was subsequently selected 40th overall by the Colorado Avalanche. After attending the Avalanche's 2015 training camp, Meloche began the 2015–16 season in his third year with a rebuilding Drakkar. Despite languishing in the standings, Meloche was leading the defense in scoring with 16 points in 25 games before he was traded by Baie-Comeau to title contenders, Gatineau Olympiques, in exchange for a prospect and two draft picks on December 16, 2015. In being depended upon in a more defensive orientated role with the Olympiques, Meloche contributed with 5 goals and 17 points to end the regular season. He added three points in 9 post-season games before the Olympiques were eliminated in the second-round.

In his final junior season in 2016–17, Meloche was unable to prevent Gatineau from a slow start in the standings. Despite leading the blueline in scoring with 21 points in 26 games, Meloche was again traded to a title contender, in a seven player deal with the Charlottetown Islanders on December 21, 2016. On March 6, 2017, it was announced that Meloche signed his first NHL contract, agreeing to a three-year entry-level deal with the Colorado Avalanche.

Having completed his junior career, Meloche attended the 2017 Colorado Avalanche training camp and played in the opening pre-season game before he was reassigned to AHL affiliate, the San Antonio Rampage, on September 20, 2017.

Prior to the 2019–20 season, unable to make his breakthrough to the NHL with the Avalanche, Meloche was traded to the San Jose Sharks in exchange for Antoine Bibeau on September 27, 2019. He was re-signed on October 6, 2020, to a one-year contract. His NHL debut came on January 14, 2021 in a 4–3 shootout win over the Arizona Coyotes. On February 18, 2021, he recorded his first point in a 2–3 overtime loss to the St. Louis Blues, getting an assist. He signed a one-year extension with the Sharks on June 14, 2021. He scored his first NHL goal on January 26, 2022, in a 4–1 win against the Washington Capitals.

As a free agent from the Sharks, Meloche was signed to a one-year, $950,000 contract with the Calgary Flames on July 13, 2022. He was assigned to the Flames AHL affiliate, the Calgary Wranglers for the duration of the 2022–23 season, posting 21 points through 64 regular season games.

Meloche left the Flames at the conclusion of his contract and remained un-signed as a free agent before accepting a professional tryout deal with the Columbus Blue Jackets in August 2023. After attending training camp, Meloche was unsuccessful in his bid for a contract and was released by the Blue Jackets during the pre-season. On October 4, 2023, Meloche opted to continue his career abroad, agreeing to a one-year deal with Russian club, Salavat Yulaev Ufa of the KHL. In the 2023–24 season, Meloche established himself on the blueline with Salavat, registering 5 goals and 18 points through 40 regular season games. He registered a further 2 assists through 6 playoffs games.

Having concluded his one year contract with Salavat, on August 1, 2024, Meloche's KHL rights were traded to Belarusian KHL club, HC Dinamo Minsk, in exchange for financial compensation. He was later signed by Dinamo to a one-year contract for the 2024–25 season on August 9, 2024.

== Career statistics ==
=== Regular season and playoffs ===
| | | | Regular season | | | | | Playoffs |
| Season | Team | League | GP | G | A | Pts | PIM | GP | G | A | Pts | PIM |
|---|---|---|---|---|---|---|---|---|---|---|---|---|
| 2013–14 | Baie-Comeau Drakkar | QMJHL | 54 | 6 | 19 | 25 | 47 | 22 | 0 | 8 | 8 | 8 |
| 2014–15 | Baie-Comeau Drakkar | QMJHL | 44 | 10 | 24 | 34 | 99 | 12 | 4 | 6 | 10 | 22 |
| 2015–16 | Baie-Comeau Drakkar | QMJHL | 25 | 8 | 8 | 16 | 54 | — | — | — | — | — |
| 2015–16 | Gatineau Olympiques | QMJHL | 28 | 5 | 12 | 17 | 38 | 9 | 1 | 2 | 3 | 10 |
| 2016–17 | Gatineau Olympiques | QMJHL | 26 | 7 | 14 | 21 | 38 | — | — | — | — | — |
| 2016–17 | Charlottetown Islanders | QMJHL | 35 | 9 | 17 | 26 | 35 | 13 | 3 | 4 | 7 | 30 |
| 2017–18 | San Antonio Rampage | AHL | 58 | 5 | 12 | 17 | 59 | — | — | — | — | — |
| 2017–18 | Colorado Eagles | ECHL | 5 | 1 | 0 | 1 | 0 | 24 | 1 | 5 | 6 | 41 |
| 2018–19 | Colorado Eagles | AHL | 55 | 6 | 15 | 21 | 53 | 4 | 0 | 2 | 2 | 0 |
| 2019–20 | San Jose Barracuda | AHL | 41 | 0 | 7 | 7 | 34 | — | — | — | — | — |
| 2020–21 | San Jose Sharks | NHL | 7 | 0 | 1 | 1 | 0 | — | — | — | — | — |
| 2020–21 | San Jose Barracuda | AHL | 29 | 0 | 9 | 9 | 28 | 4 | 1 | 3 | 4 | 2 |
| 2021–22 | San Jose Barracuda | AHL | 10 | 1 | 0 | 1 | 14 | — | — | — | — | — |
| 2021–22 | San Jose Sharks | NHL | 50 | 2 | 5 | 7 | 39 | — | — | — | — | — |
| 2022–23 | Calgary Wranglers | AHL | 64 | 4 | 17 | 21 | 66 | 5 | 0 | 0 | 0 | 6 |
| 2023–24 | Salavat Yulaev Ufa | KHL | 40 | 5 | 13 | 18 | 32 | 6 | 0 | 2 | 2 | 4 |
| 2024–25 | Dinamo Minsk | KHL | 67 | 4 | 7 | 11 | 42 | 11 | 2 | 3 | 5 | 8 |
| 2025–26 | Dinamo Minsk | KHL | 64 | 3 | 12 | 15 | 46 | 8 | 0 | 0 | 0 | 13 |
| NHL totals | | | 57 | 2 | 6 | 8 | 39 | — | — | — | — | — |
| KHL totals | | | 171 | 12 | 32 | 44 | 120 | 25 | 2 | 5 | 7 | 25 |

=== International ===
| Year | Team | Event | Result | GP | G | A | Pts | PIM |
|---|---|---|---|---|---|---|---|---|
| 2014 | Canada Quebec | U17 | 4th | 6 | 1 | 1 | 2 | 4 |
| 2014 | Canada | IH18 | 1st place, gold medalist(s) | 5 | 0 | 1 | 1 | 6 |
| Junior totals | | | | 11 | 1 | 2 | 3 | 10 |

== Awards and honours ==
| Award | Year |
|---|---|
CHL
| QMJHL All-Rookie Team | 2013–14 |
| Ivan Hlinka Memorial Tournament Gold Medal | 2014 |
| Subway Super Series QMJHL All-Stars | 2014 |
| CHL/NHL Top Prospects Game | 2015 |
ECHL
| Kelly Cup (Colorado Eagles) | 2018 |
