= Charlottetown Islanders =

Junior ice hockey team in Prince Edward Island

Charlottetown Islanders Islanders de Charlottetown
- City: Charlottetown, Prince Edward Island
- League: Quebec Maritimes Junior Hockey League
- Conference: Eastern
- Division: Maritimes
- Founded: 1999
- Home arena: Eastlink Centre
- Colours: Black, harvest gold and white
- General manager: Scott Harris
- Head coach: John Mitchell
- Website: charlottetownislanders.com

Franchise history
- 1999–2003: Montreal Rocket
- 2003–2013: P.E.I. Rocket
- 2013–present: Charlottetown Islanders

Current uniform

The Charlottetown Islanders are a Canadian junior ice hockey team in the Quebec Maritimes Junior Hockey League (QMJHL) based in Charlottetown, Prince Edward Island. They are members of the Maritimes Division, and play their home games at the Eastlink Centre. The franchise was founded as the Montreal Rocket in 1999, then relocated to Charlottetown in 2003.

== History ==
Originally located in Montreal, Quebec and known as the Montreal Rocket, the team relocated to Charlottetown, Prince Edward Island, in 2003. They were named after Maurice "Rocket" Richard of the Montreal Canadiens, and their team crest depicted his number, 9.

In their first season on PEI, the Rocket won 40 regular season games and made it to the second round of the playoffs, where they lost in six games to the Moncton Wildcats led by future NHL star goaltender Corey Crawford.

Beginning in the 2013–14 season, the Rocket rebranded as the Charlottetown Islanders.

President and governor Serge Savard Jr. confirmed that the QMJHL offered to buy the struggling franchise. Savard said he intended to accept the offer, somewhere in the area of $3.5 million, unless he was able to find a local buyer or buyers for the team. Savard said league commissioner Gilles Corteau had given him until April 26 to secure a buyer. One interested group intended to relocate the team to Sorel, Quebec. An ownership group led by Geoff Boyle purchased the team in 2013, keeping it in Charlottetown. The new Islanders logo and colour scheme was unveiled on May 26.

In the 2014–15 season, for the first time since the franchise's inaugural season as the PEI Rocket, the Charlottetown Islanders advanced to the second round of the QMJHL playoffs, after defeating the Sherbrooke Phoenix 4–2 in the first round. However, in the second round, they were eliminated by the Quebec Remparts 4–0.

On June 29, 2015, the Islanders hired Jim Hulton as head coach after Gordie Dwyer was relieved of his duties as head coach.

On March 29, 2016, the Islanders set a new QMJHL record for most shots on goal in one period of a playoff game with 32. The previous record was 30, shared by four teams.

On June 4, 2016, the Charlottetown Islanders hosted the 2016 QMJHL Draft, a first for the franchise since 2006 when they were known as the P.E.I. Rocket.

On April 13, 2017, the Islanders advanced to the third round of the playoffs for the first time in franchise history, eliminating the Cape Breton Screaming Eagles four games to none in the second round.

On March 14, 2021, Kenzie Lalonde became the first woman to provide play-by-play coverage on television for any QMJHL game; the game was between the Islanders and the Halifax Mooseheads, with the Mooseheads hosting.

On May 30, 2022, the Islanders won their third round series to make their first-ever appearance in the President's Cup Final. This also marked the fourth time in the previous five playoffs that the team reached the third round.

== Players ==
=== Retired numbers ===
- 9 Maurice Richard (Montreal Rocket, DNP)
- 22 Pierre-André Bureau (P.E.I. Rocket, 2000–2005)

=== NHL alumni ===
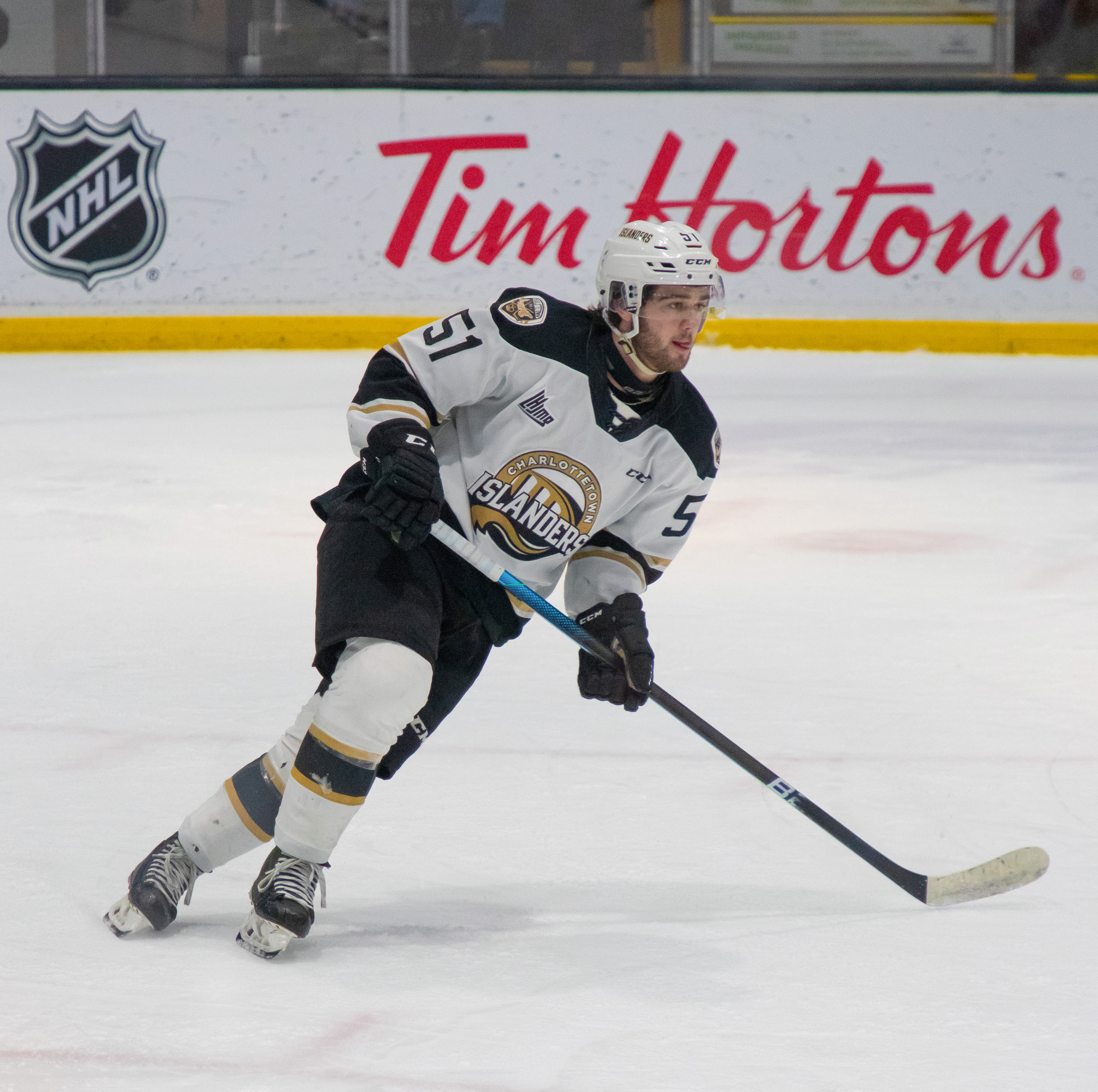
Lukas Cormier with the Islanders in 2022

The following players have played in at least one National Hockey League (NHL) game as of the conclusion of the 2024–25 NHL season:

- Nikita Alexandrov
- Antoine Bibeau
- Samuel Blais
- Guillaume Brisebois
- Filip Chlapik
- Ryane Clowe
- Lukas Cormier
- Josh Currie
- Hunter Drew
- Colten Ellis
- Marc-André Gragnani
- Ryan Graves
- Ross Johnston
- Pierre-Olivier Joseph
- Maxime Lagace
- David Laliberté
- Maxim Lapierre
- Pascal Leclaire
- Nicolas Meloche
- Andrej Nestrasil
- Louis Robitaille
- Daniel Sprong

=== NHL first round draft picks ===
List of first round selections in the NHL entry draft:

Year	#	Player	Nationality	NHL team
2017	23	Pierre-Olivier Joseph (D)	Canada	Arizona Coyotes

== Season-by-season results ==
- Montreal Rocket (1999–2003)
- P.E.I. Rocket (2003–2013)
- Charlottetown Islanders (2013–present)

=== Regular season ===
OTL = Overtime loss
SL = Shootout loss

Season	Games	Won	Lost	Tied	OTL	SL	Points	Pct %	Goals for	Goals against	Standing
1999–2000	72	29	32	6	5	-	69	0.479	276	313	3rd West
2000–01	72	24	35	7	6	-	61	0.424	249	310	4th West
2001–02	72	23	39	8	2	-	56	0.389	198	243	4th West
2002–03	72	32	27	5	8	-	77	0.535	256	261	3rd West
2003–04	70	40	19	5	6	-	91	0.607	251	189	3rd Atlantic
2004–05	70	24	39	7	0	-	55	0.393	198	260	4th Atlantic
2005–06	70	25	38	-	4	3	57	0.373	221	304	7th East
2006–07	70	36	28	-	2	6	80	0.514	278	250	4th East
2007–08	70	30	36	-	2	2	64	0.425	243	287	7th East
2008–09	68	26	32	-	5	5	62	0.382	229	243	6th Atlantic
2009–10	68	35	25	-	2	6	78	0.515	215	224	4th Atlantic
2010–11	68	33	26	-	3	6	75	0.551	217	220	4th Maritimes
2011–12	68	19	43	-	2	4	44	0.324	205	320	6th Maritimes
2012–13	68	41	23	-	3	1	86	0.632	262	229	3rd Telus Maritimes
2013–14	68	21	39	-	3	5	50	0.368	186	256	Tied 4th Telus Maritimes
2014–15	68	35	28	-	1	4	75	0.551	226	243	2nd Maritimes
2015–16	68	35	26	-	5	2	77	0.566	227	232	4th Maritimes
2016–17	68	46	18	-	4	0	96	0.706	303	214	2nd Maritimes
2017–18	68	37	24	-	7	0	81	0.596	209	219	3rd Maritimes
2018–19	68	40	21	-	4	3	87	0.640	233	211	2nd Maritimes
2019–20	64	33	26	-	5	0	71	0.555	197	205	3rd Maritimes
2020–21	40	35	5	-	0	0	70	0.875	197	89	1st Maritimes
2021–22	68	48	13	-	7	0	103	0.757	283	179	1st Maritimes
2022–23	68	26	33	-	6	3	61	0.449	189	267	4th Maritimes
2023–24	68	26	34	-	6	2	60	0.441	208	267	5th Maritimes
2024–25	64	30	29	-	4	1	65	0.508	194	203	4th Maritimes
2025–26	64	33	23	-	2	6	74	0.578	217	240	3rd Maritimes

=== Playoffs ===
Season	1st round	2nd round	3rd round	Finals
1999–2000	L, 1–4, Drummondville	–	–	–
2000–01	Did not qualify			
2001–02	L, 3–4, Hull	–	–	–
2002–03	L, 3–4, Sherbrooke	–	–	–
2003–04	W, 4–1, Quebec	L, 2–4, Moncton	–	–
2004–05	Did not qualify			
2005–06	L, 2–4, Acadie–Bathurst	–	–	–
2006–07	L, 3–4, Acadie–Bathurst	–	–	–
2007–08	L, 0–4, Saint John	–	–	–
2008–09	L, 1–4, Moncton	–	–	–
2009–10	L, 1–4, Saint John	–	–	–
2010–11	L, 1–4, Shawinigan	–	–	–
2011–12	Did not qualify			
2012–13	L, 2–4, Val-d'Or	–	–	–
2013–14	L, 0–4, Halifax	–	–	–
2014–15	W, 4–2, Sherbrooke	L, 0–4, Quebec	–	–
2015–16	W, 4–2, Rimouski	L, 2–4, Shawinigan	–	–
2016–17	W, 4–0, Baie-Comeau	W, 4–0, Cape Breton	L, 1–4, Blainville-Boisbriand	–
2017–18	W, 4–3, Quebec	W, 4–0, Halifax	L, 3–4, Blainville-Boisbriand	–
2018–19	L, 2–4, Cape Breton	–	–	–
2019–20	QMJHL playoffs cancelled due to ongoing COVID-19 pandemic			
2020–21	Bye	W, 3–0, Acadie–Bathurst	L, 2–3, Victoriaville	–
2021–22	W, 3–0, Moncton	W, 3–0, Acadie–Bathurst	W, 3–1, Sherbrooke	L, 1–4, Shawinigan
2022–23	L, 0–4, Quebec	–	–	–
2023–24	L, 0–4, Baie-Comeau	–	–	–
2024–25	L, 0–4, Rimouski	–	–	–
2025–26	L, 3–4, Quebec	–	–	–

== See also ==
- List of ice hockey teams in Prince Edward Island
