= 2011–12 QMJHL season =

- League: Quebec Major Junior Hockey League
- Sport: Hockey
- Duration: Regular season September 2011 – March 2012; Playoffs; March – May 2012
- Teams: 17

Draft
- Top draft pick: Nathan MacKinnon
- Picked by: Baie-Comeau Drakkar

Regular season
- Jean Rougeau Trophy: Saint John Sea Dogs (3)
- Season MVP: Yanni Gourde (Victoriaville Tigres)
- Top scorer: Yanni Gourde (Victoriaville Tigres)

Playoffs
- Playoffs MVP: Charlie Coyle (Sea Dogs)
- Finals champions: Saint John Sea Dogs
- Runners-up: Rimouski Océanic

QMJHL seasons
- 2010–11 2012–13

2011–12 CHL season
- League: Canadian Hockey League
- Sport: Ice hockey
- Duration: OHL; September 2011 – March 2012; QMJHL; September 2011 – March 2012; WHL; September 2011 – March 2012
- Teams: 60
- TV partner(s): RDS, Rogers Sportsnet, Rogers TV, Shaw TV
- Season MVP: Brendan Shinnimin (Tri-City Americans) (WHL)
- Top scorer: Brendan Shinnimin (Tri-City Americans) (WHL)

Memorial Cup
- Finals champions: Shawinigan Cataractes (QMJHL) (1st title)
- Runners-up: London Knights (OHL)

The 2011–12 QMJHL season was the 43rd season of the Quebec Major Junior Hockey League (QMJHL). The regular season, which consisted of 17 teams playing 68 games each, began in September 2011 and ended in March 2012. This season was Blainville-Boisbriand Armada's first season in the league, as the team relocated to Boisbriand from Verdun where they played as the Montreal Junior Hockey Club from 2008 to 2011. The league lost one of his charter teams when the Lewiston Maineiacs folded during after the previous season, the QMJHL later announce an expansion team to Sherbrooke for the 2012–13 season. In the playoffs, the Saint John Sea Dogs became the seventh team in league history to capture consecutive President's Cup championships.

== Regular season ==
=== Division standings ===
Note: GP = Games played; W = Wins; L = Losses; OTL = Overtime losses; SL - Shootout losses; GF = Goals for; GA = Goals against; Pts = Points

Division Maritimes	GP	W	L	OTL	SL	GF	GA	Pts
Saint John Sea Dogs ^{z}	68	50	15	0	3	298	180	103
Halifax Mooseheads ^{x}	68	39	22	2	5	250	238	85
Acadie–Bathurst Titan ^{x}	68	32	31	2	3	250	264	69
Moncton Wildcats ^{x}	68	30	31	3	4	190	228	67
Cape Breton Screaming Eagles ^{x}	68	23	42	1	2	219	306	49
P.E.I. Rocket ^{e}	68	19	43	2	4	205	320	44

Division Telus East	GP	W	L	OTL	SL	GF	GA	Pts
Shawinigan Cataractes ^{z}	68	45	16	3	4	274	179	97
Victoriaville Tigres ^{x}	68	44	18	1	5	311	228	94
Quebec Remparts ^{x}	68	43	18	5	2	275	191	93
Rimouski Océanic ^{x}	68	40	26	2	0	260	235	82
Chicoutimi Saguenéens ^{x}	68	35	24	3	6	235	232	79
Baie-Comeau Drakkar ^{x}	68	29	34	1	4	217	241	63

Division Telus West	GP	W	L	OTL	SL	GF	GA	Pts
Blainville-Boisbriand Armada ^{z}	68	40	22	4	2	258	219	86
Val-d'Or Foreurs ^{x}	68	31	32	0	5	224	261	67
Drummondville Voltigeurs ^{x}	68	28	31	2	7	221	245	65
Gatineau Olympiques ^{x}	68	26	32	5	5	223	274	62
Rouyn-Noranda Huskies ^{x}	68	24	36	4	4	227	296	56

x - team has clinched playoff spot

y - team is division leader

z - team has clinched division

e - team is eliminated from playoff contention

=== Scoring leaders ===
Note: GP = Games played; G = Goals; A = Assists; Pts = Points; PIM = Penalty minutes

Player	Team	GP	G	A	Pts	PIM
Yanni Gourde	Victoriaville Tigres	68	37	87	124	70
Zach O'Brien	Acadie–Bathurst Titan	63	50	51	101	0
Sébastien Trudeau	Acadie–Bathurst Titan	67	31	64	95	14
Frederick Roy	Quebec Remparts	64	27	65	92	88
Alex Belzile	Rimouski Océanic	63	22	70	92	85
Danick Gauthier	Saint John Sea Dogs	66	47	39	86	67
Brandon Hynes	Victoriaville Tigres	61	42	44	86	29
Mikhail Grigorenko	Quebec Remparts	59	40	45	85	12
Jonathan Brunelle	Cape Breton Screaming Eagles	68	30	55	85	45
Matt Bissonnette	Acadie–Bathurst Titan	65	36	47	83	49
Alex Saulnier	Moncton Wildcats	58	31	52	83	31

=== Leading goaltenders ===
Note: GP = Games played; TOI = Total ice time; W = Wins; L = Losses; GA = Goals against; SO = Total shutouts; SV% = Save percentage; GAA = Goals against average

Player	Team	GP	TOI	W	L	GA	SO	SV%	GAA
Mathieu Corbeil-Thériault	Saint John Sea Dogs	48	2778:40	37	11	110	6	.911	2.38
Gabriel Girard	Shawinigan Cataractes	36	1937:12	20	10	79	4	.911	2.45
Alex Dubeau	Shawinigan Cataractes	40	2136:32	25	13	91	3	.904	2.56
Louis Domingue	Quebec Remparts	39	2161:58	23	12	94	4	.914	2.61
Étienne Marcoux	Blainville-Boisbriand Armada	43	2327:35	28	12	105	3	.912	2.71

== 2012 President's Cup playoffs ==
Round 1
1	Saint John	4
16	Cape Breton	0
4	Victoriaville	0
13	Baie-Comeau	4
2	Shawinigan	4
15	Rouyn-Noranda	0
8	Chicoutimi	4
9	Acadie–Bathurst	2
5	Quebec	4
12	Drummondville	0
6	Halifax	4
11	Moncton	0
3	Blainville-Boisbriand	4
14	Gatineau	0
7	Rimouski	4
10	Val-d'Or	0

Quarter-finals
1	Saint John	4
13	Baie-Comeau	0
2	Shawinigan	3
8	Chicoutimi	4
5	Quebec	3
6	Halifax	4
3	Blainville-Boisbriand	3
7	Rimouski	4

Semi-finals
1	Saint John	4
8	Chicoutimi	1
6	Halifax	2
7	Rimouski	4

President's Cup Championship
1	Saint John	4
7	Rimouski	0

== First round ==
=== (1) Saint John Sea Dogs vs. (16) Cape Breton Screaming Eagles ===
March 23	Saint John Sea Dogs	13 – 4	Cape Breton Screaming Eagles	Harbour Station	Recap
4:18 - Danick Gauthier (1); 15:48 - Charles-Olivier Roussel (1)		First period	Kyle Farrell (1) - 8:12; William Carrier (1) - 11:57
1:39 - pp - Charlie Coyle (1); 3:31 - Tomáš Jurčo (1); 3:51 - Charlie Coyle (2); 5:32 - sh - Jonathan Huberdeau (1); 8:57 - Danick Gauthier (2); 10:14 - Jason Seed (1); 13:19 - Charlie Coyle (3); 16:59 - pp - Aidan Kelly (1)		Second period	Bronson Beaton (1) - 9:37; Bronson Beaton (2) - 19:45
1:33 - Zack Phillips (1); 8:20 - Nathan Beaulieu (1); 17:38 - Stanislav Galiev (1)		Third period	No scoring
Mathieu Corbeil-Thériault (15 saves / 19 shots)		Goalie stats	Philippe Trudeau (29 saves / 39 shots); William Racicot (8 saves / 11 shots)

March 24	Saint John Sea Dogs	8 – 1	Cape Breton Screaming Eagles	Harbour Station	Recap
5:58 - Nathan Beaulieu (2); 18:06 - pp - Charlie Coyle (4); 18:51 - Charlie Coyle (5)		First period	No scoring
6:08 - Zack Phillips (2); 10:39 - Stephen MacAulay (1); 13:48 - Charlie Coyle (6); 17:40 - pp - Stephen MacAulay (2)		Second period	No scoring
5:43 - Stanislav Galiev (2)		Third period	William Carrier (2) - pp - 17:17
Mathieu Corbeil-Thériault (15 saves / 16 shots)		Goalie stats	Philippe Trudeau (39 saves / 47 shots)

March 27	Cape Breton Screaming Eagles	2 – 8	Saint John Sea Dogs	Centre 200	Recap
No scoring		First period	Charlie Coyle (7) - 1:35; Danick Gauthier (3) - 2:26; Danick Gauthier (4) - 3:03; Kevin Gagné (1) - 5:01
0:22 - William Carrier (3); 18:51 - Kyle Farrell (2)		Second period	Tomáš Jurčo (2) - 3:51; Charlie Coyle (8) - 14:21; Jonathan Huberdeau (2) - 15:01
No scoring		Third period	Ryan Tesink (1) - pp - 13:06
Philippe Trudeau (3 saves / 6 shots); William Racicot (27 saves / 32 shots)		Goalie stats	Mathieu Corbeil-Thériault (27 saves / 29 shots)

March 28	Cape Breton Screaming Eagles	1 – 5	Saint John Sea Dogs	Centre 200	Recap
11:00 - Danny Potvin (1)		First period	Aidan Kelly (2) - 15:03
No scoring		Second period	Tomáš Jurčo (3) - 8:21
No scoring		Third period	Stanislav Galiev (3) - 3:17; Danick Gauthier (5) - pp - 12:27
Philippe Trudeau (26 saves / 31 shots)		Goalie stats	Mathieu Corbeil-Thériault (33 saves / 34 shots)

Saint John won series 4 – 0

=== (2) Shawinigan Cataractes vs. (15) Rouyn-Noranda Huskies ===
March 23	Shawinigan Cataractes	7 – 1	Rouyn-Noranda Huskies	Centre Bionest	Recap
7:40 - sh - Loïk Poudrier (1); 8:22 - Yannick Veilleux (1); 8:39 - Kirill Kabanov (1); 17:41 - Morgan Ellis (1)		First period	No scoring
12:04 - pp - Yannick Veilleux (2)		Second period	No scoring
5:43 - pp - Morgan Ellis (2); 7:14 - pp - Jonathan Racine (1)		Third period	Alexandre Leclerc (1) - 2:30
Gabriel Girard (16 saves / 17 shots)		Goalie stats	Robin Gusse (48 saves / 55 shots)

March 24	Shawinigan Cataractes	6 – 3	Rouyn-Noranda Huskies	Centre Bionest	Recap
3:40 - sh - Loïk Poudrier (2); 6:12 - Michael Chaput (1); 16:40 - Loïk Poudrier (2)		First period	No scoring
17:24 - Michaël Bournival (1)		Second period	Mathieu Brisebois (1) - pp - 19:04
1:31 - Mitchell Maynard (1); 16:23 - Kirill Kabanov (2)		Third period	Maxime St-Cyr (1) - 11:36; Marcus Power (1) - 15:55
Gabriel Girard (24 saves / 27 shots)		Goalie stats	Robin Gusse (34 saves / 40 shots)

March 27	Rouyn-Noranda Huskies	2 – 3	Shawinigan Cataractes	Aréna Iamgold	Recap
No scoring		First period	Michael Chaput (2) - 11:40; Yannick Veilleux (3) - 12:00
2:37 - Peter Angelopoulos (1); 17:10 - pp - Jean-Sébastien Dea (1)		Second period	Vincent Arseneau (1) - 9:54
No scoring		Third period	No scoring
Robin Gusse (8 saves / 10 shots); Antonio Mastropietro (22 saves / 23 shots)		Goalie stats	Gabriel Girard (26 saves / 28 shots)

March 28	Rouyn-Noranda Huskies	2 – 6	Shawinigan Cataractes	Aréna Iamgold	Recap
6:21 - Mathieu Lemay (1)		First period	Yannick Veilleux (4) - 0:24; Pierre-Olivier Morin (1) - 4:17
No scoring		Second period	Frédérick Gaudreau (1) - 5:33; Yannick Veilleux (5) - pp - 10:20
18:27 - Liam O'Brien (1)		Third period	Michael Chaput (3) - 3:51; Justin Haché (1) - 19:01
Robin Gusse (47 saves / 53 shots)		Goalie stats	Gabriel Girard (19 saves / 21 shots)

Shawinigan won series 4 – 0

=== (3) Blainville-Boisbriand Armada vs. (14) Gatineau Olympiques ===
March 22	Blainville-Boisbriand Armada	7 – 2	Gatineau Olympiques	Centre d'Excellence Sports Rousseau	Recap
15:38 - pp - Alex Micallef (1); 17:11 - Tommy Giroux (1)		First period	No scoring
6:13 - Cédric Paquette (1); 12:15 - Jess Tanguy (1); 17:25 - Raphaël Pouliot (1); 19:29 - Marc-Olivier Roy (1)		Second period	Samuel Courtemanche (1) - 12:33
14:01 - pp - Raphaël Pouliot (2)		Third period	Adam Chapman (1) - 13:07
Étienne Marcoux (19 saves / 21 shots)		Goalie stats	François Lacerte (25 saves / 31 shots); Mathieu Bezeau (6 saves / 7 shots)

March 23	Blainville-Boisbriand Armada	5 – 1	Gatineau Olympiques	Centre d'Excellence Sports Rousseau	Recap
6:10 - pp - Jess Tanguy (2); 14:17 - Cédric Paquette (2)		First period	No scoring
3:11 - Christopher Clapperton (1); 8:32 - Jess Tanguy (3); 12:02 - pp - Marc-Olivier Roy (2)		Second period	No scoring
No scoring		Third period	Robert Pelletier (1) - pp - 17:28
Étienne Marcoux (18 saves / 19 shots)		Goalie stats	François Lacerte (13 saves / 18 shots); Mathieu Bezeau (14 saves / 14 shots)

March 27	Gatineau Olympiques	5 – 8	Blainville-Boisbriand Armada	Robert Guertin Centre	Recap
17:17 - pp - Robert Pelletier (2)		First period	Xavier Ouellet (1) - 0:42; Elie Bérubé (1) - 7:39; Marc-Olivier Roy (3) - 18:42
0:27 - pp - Rock Régimbald (1)		Second period	Jess Tanguy (4) - 4:17; Tommy Giroux (2) - 18:22
4:15 - Raphaël Lafontaine (1); 14:28 - Adam Chapman (2); 19:39 - Samuel Courtemanche (2)		Third period	Cédric Paquette (3) - 3:43; Raphaël Pouliot (3) - pp - 10:26; Tommy Giroux (3) - 18:35
Mathieu Bezeau (6 saves / 8 shots); François Lacerte (20 saves / 26 shots)		Goalie stats	Étienne Marcoux (13 saves / 18 shots)

March 28	Gatineau Olympiques	3 – 4	OT	Blainville-Boisbriand Armada	Robert Guertin Centre	Recap
1:03 - Tomáš Hyka (1); 5:35 - pp - Émile Poirier (1)		First period		Jess Tanguy (5) - pp - 13:26; Christopher Clapperton (2) - pp - 19:19
3:05 - Adam Jánošík (1)		Second period		No scoring
No scoring		Third period		Tommy Giroux (4) - 14:34
No scoring		First overtime period		Christopher Clapperton (3) - 6:51
François Lacerte (40 saves / 44 shots)		Goalie stats		Étienne Marcoux (23 saves / 26 shots)

Blainville-Boisbriand won series 4 – 0

=== (4) Victoriaville Tigres vs. (13) Baie-Comeau Drakkar ===
March 23	Victoriaville Tigres	3 – 4	Baie-Comeau Drakkar	Colisée Desjardins	Recap
No scoring		First period	Jonathan Lessard (1) - 17:01
10:24 - Angelo Miceli (1)		Second period	Carl Gélinas (1) - sh - 18:41
3:47 - sh - Philippe Halley (1); 18:00 - Philippe Maillet (1)		Third period	Raphaël Bussières (1) - 6:38; Gabriel Verpaelst (1) - 11:22
David Honzík (24 saves / 28 shots)		Goalie stats	Philippe Cadorette (33 saves / 36 shots)

March 24	Victoriaville Tigres	3 – 5	Baie-Comeau Drakkar	Colisée Desjardins	Recap
14:09 - Félix Girard (1); 14:15 - Jonathan Lessard (2)		First period	No scoring
11:04 - Raphaël Bussières (2); 12:08 - pp - David Rose (1)		Second period	Carl-Antoine Delisle (1) - 6:42; Brandon Hynes (1) - 17:38
15:24 - David Rose (2)		Third period	Stefan Fournier (1) - pp - 3:07
David Honzík (10 saves / 14 shots); Brandon Whitney (6 saves / 7 shots)		Goalie stats	Philippe Cadorette (25 saves / 28 shots)

March 27	Baie-Comeau Drakkar	8 – 2	Victoriaville Tigres	Centre Henry-Leonard	Recap
6:15 - pp - Samuel Carrier (1); 10:18 - pp - Lukáš Cingel (1); 19:57 - sh - Félix Girard (2)		First period	Brandon Hynes (2) - pp - 12:04
2:13 - Lukáš Cingel (2); 17:49 - pp - Carl Gélinas (2); 18:30 - Jean-Philippe Caron (1)		Second period	Yannick Dubé (1) - pp - 4:19
5:20 - Sacha Guimond (1); 11:31 - pp - Jean-François Leblanc (1)		Third period	No scoring
Philippe Cadorette (24 saves / 26 shots)		Goalie stats	Brandon Whitney (21 saves / 27 shots); David Honzík (7 saves / 9 shots)

March 28	Baie-Comeau Drakkar	5 – 4	OT	Victoriaville Tigres	Centre Henry-Leonard	Recap
6:13 - Jean-Philippe Caron (2)		First period		Yannick Dubé (2) - pp - 13:59
0:36 - pp - Tomáš Filippi (1); 1:59 - David Rose (3)		Second period		No scoring
16:05 - Jonathan Lessard (3)		Third period		Philippe Maillet (2) - 0:58; Philippe Halley (2) - sh - 14:59; Yanni Gourde (1) - 15:41
6:55 - pp - Jonathan Lessard (4)		First overtime period		No scoring
Philippe Cadorette (32 saves / 36 shots)		Goalie stats		Brandon Whitney (32 saves / 37 shots)

Baie-Comeau won series 4 – 0

=== (5) Quebec Remparts vs. (12) Drummondville Voltigeurs ===
March 22	Quebec Remparts	5 – 2	Drummondville Voltigeurs	Colisée Pepsi	Recap
3:43 - Mikhail Grigorenko (1); 5:34 - Martin Lefebvre (1); 7:22 - pp - Logan Shaw (1); 10:33 - Vincent Barnard (1)		First period	No scoring
No scoring		Second period	No scoring
2:35 - sh - Gabriel Desjardins (1)		Third period	15:18 - pp - Raman Hrabarenka (1); 18:17 - Michael Santini (1)
Louis Domingue (23 saves / 25 shots)		Goalie stats	Domenic Graham (3 saves / 7 shots); Alexandre Véronneau (27 saves / 28 shots)

March 26	Quebec Remparts	10 – 2	Drummondville Voltigeurs	Colisée Pepsi	Recap
4:36 - pp - Logan Shaw (2); 10:09 - Adam Erne (1); 11:06 - Gabriel Desjardins (2); 14:03 - pp - Alexandre Comtois (1)		First period	No scoring
0:23 - Jérémie Malouin (1); 3:11 - pp - Anthony Duclair (1); 5:46 - Logan Shaw (3); 17:53 - Mathieu Lavallée (1)		Second period	No scoring
6:58 - sh - Gabriel Desjardins (3); 18:31 - pp - Frederick Roy (1)		Third period	Marc-Olivier Brouillard (1) - 1:43; André Bouvet-Morrissette (1) - pp - 11:11
Louis Domingue (16 saves / 18 shots)		Goalie stats	Domenic Graham (20 saves / 27 shots); Alexandre Véronneau (11 saves / 14 shots)

March 27	Drummondville Voltigeurs	3 – 9	Quebec Remparts	Centre Marcel Dionne	Recap
13:16 - pp - Alex Émond (1)		First period	Jérémie Malouin (2) - 18:05
11:55 - pp - André Bouvet-Morrissette (2)		Second period	Logan Shaw (4) - pp - 4:15; Jérémie Malouin (3) - 8:53
9:14 - pp - Raman Hrabarenka (2)		Third period	Vincent Barnard (2) - 2:55; Mike McNamee (1) - 4:26; Vincent Barnard (3) - pp - 4:54; Vincent Barnard (4) - pp - 6:50; Gabriel Desjardins (4) - pp - 10:57; Martin Lefebvre (2) - pp - 12:40
Domenic Graham (18 saves / 21 shots); Alexandre Véronneau (6 saves / 12 shots)		Goalie stats	Louis Domingue (33 saves / 36 shots)

March 29	Drummondville Voltigeurs	1 – 2	OT	Quebec Remparts	Centre Marcel Dionne	Recap
No scoring		First period		No scoring
19:29 - pp - Olivier Archambault (1)		Second period		Frederick Roy (2) - pp - 17:09
No scoring		Third period		No scoring
No scoring		First overtime period		Alexandre Comtois (2) - 2:30
Alexandre Véronneau (28 saves / 30 shots)		Goalie stats		Louis Domingue (23 saves / 24 shots)

Quebec won series 4 – 0

=== (6) Halifax Mooseheads vs. (11) Moncton Wildcats ===
March 23	Halifax Mooseheads	5 – 1	Moncton Wildcats	Halifax Metro Centre	Recap
18:13 - Nathan MacKinnon (1)		First period	James Melindy (1) - pp - 3:40
2:09 - Jonathan Drouin (1); 3:06 - Nathan MacKinnon (2)		Second period	No scoring
3:38 - Martin Frk (1); 8:03 - pp - Martin Frk (2)		Third period	No scoring
Zachary Fucale (17 saves / 18 shots)		Goalie stats	Roman Will (35 saves / 40 shots)

March 24	Halifax Mooseheads	4 – 1	Moncton Wildcats	Halifax Metro Centre	Recap
0:50 - Martin Frk (3); 0:56 - Alexandre Grenier (1)		First period	No scoring
13:20 - Cameron Critchlow (1)		Second period	No scoring
7:21 - ps - Nathan MacKinnon (3)		Third period	James Melindy (2) - pp - 14:17
Zachary Fucale (28 saves / 29 shots)		Goalie stats	Roman Will (29 saves / 33 shots)

March 26	Moncton Wildcats	2 – 8	Halifax Mooseheads	Moncton Coliseum	Recap
No scoring		First period	Nathan MacKinnon (4) - pp - 4:20; Steve Gillard (1) - 6:24; Jonathan Drouin (2) - 17:55; Brad Cuzner (1) - 19:47
16:58 - Samuel Roussy (1)		Second period	Cameron Critchlow (2) - 1:07; Cameron Critchlow (3) - 7:26; Nathan MacKinnon (5) - 17:18
14:58 - Devon MacAusland (1)		Third period	Jonathan Drouin (3) - 8:11
Roman Will (7 saves / 12 shots); Brandon Thibeau (12 saves / 15 shots)		Goalie stats	Zachary Fucale (23 saves / 25 shots)

March 27	Moncton Wildcats	4 – 5	OT	Halifax Mooseheads	Moncton Coliseum	Recap
6:53 - pp - Marek Hrivík (1); 11:12 - pp - Patrick Delisle-Houde (1); 14:32 - Patrick Delisle-Houde (2)		First period		Konrad Abeltshauser (1) - pp - 19:17
5:26 - Samuel Roussy (2)		Second period		Jonathan Drouin (4) - 2:24
No scoring		Third period		Martin Frk (4) - 3:06; Nathan MacKinnon (6) - 10:22
No scoring		First overtime period		Brent Andrews (1) - 4:06
Roman Will (31 saves / 36 shots)		Goalie stats		Zachary Fucale (22 saves / 26 shots)

Halifax won series 4 – 0

=== (7) Rimouski Océanic vs. (10) Val-d'Or Foreurs ===
March 23	Rimouski Océanic	8 – 5	Val-d'Or Foreurs	Colisée de Rimouski	Recap
1:46 - Scott Oke (1); 17:45 - pp - Alexandre Mallet (1)		First period	No scoring
12:36 - pp - Jérôme Gauthier-Leduc (1)		Second period	Benjamin Casavant (1) - 10:12; Alexandre Durette (1) - 13:25; Guillaume Gélinas (1) - 15:15
8:10 - Jean-François Plante (1); 8:33 - Alex Belzile (1); 15:07 - Jean-François Plante (2); 15:57 - pp - Alexandre Mallet (2); 18:53 - en - Peter Trainor (1)		Third period	Michaël Beaudry (1) - 4:18; Benjamin Casavant (2) - 18:17
Jacob Gervais-Chouinard (34 saves / 39 shots)		Goalie stats	François Tremblay (25 saves / 32 shots)

March 24	Rimouski Océanic	8 – 5	Val-d'Or Foreurs	Colisée de Rimouski	Recap
8:45 - pp - Jean-François Plante (3); 9:26 - pp - Alex Belzile (2); 17:47 - pp - Peter Trainor (2); 18:49 - Jérôme Gauthier-Leduc (2)		First period	Mathieu Guertin (1) - pp - 5:18; Nicolas Larocque-Marcoux (1) - pp - 15:24
0:27 - Alexandre Mallet (3)		Second period	No scoring
10:58 - Petr Straka (1); 18:03 - Francis Beauvillier (1); 19:59 - en - Jakub Culek (1)		Third period	Michaël Beaudry (2) - pp - 11:50; Benjamin Casavant (3) - 12:32; Cédrick Henley (1) - 16:25
Jacob Gervais-Chouinard (24 saves / 29 shots)		Goalie stats	François Tremblay (10 saves / 15 shots); Alexandre St-Arnaud (17 saves / 19 shots)

March 27	Val-d'Or Foreurs	2 – 3	OT	Rimouski Océanic	Centre Air Creebec	Recap
5:40 - pp - Anthony Mantha (1)		First period		No scoring
2:07 - pp - Anthony Mantha (2)		Second period		Jakub Culek (2) -15:50; Jérôme Gauthier-Leduc (3) - 18:26
No scoring		Third period		No scoring
No scoring		First overtime period		Petr Straka (2) - 11:26
François Tremblay (30 saves / 33 shots)		Goalie stats		Jacob Gervais-Chouinard (27 saves / 29 shots)

March 28	Val-d'Or Foreurs	3 – 4	Rimouski Océanic	Centre Air Creebec	Recap
5:13 - sh - Samuel Henley (1)		First period	Peter Trainor (3) - 8:41; Scott Oke (2) - 12:38; Scott Oke (3) - 18:32
16:48 - Matthieu Thériault (1)		Second period	No scoring
13:18 - pp - Vincent Dunn (1)		Third period	Jérôme Gauthier-Leduc (4) - 19:33
François Tremblay (34 saves / 38 shots)		Goalie stats	Jacob Gervais-Chouinard (23 saves / 26 shots)

Rimouski won series 4 – 0

=== (8) Chicoutimi Saguenéens vs. (9) Acadie–Bathurst Titan ===
March 23	Chicoutimi Saguenéens	3 – 1	Acadie–Bathurst Titan	Centre Georges-Vézina	Recap
6:53 - Guillaume Asselin (1)		First period	Matt Bissonnette (1) - pp - 5:15
15:59 - Guillaume Asselin (2)		Second period	No scoring
17:53 - pp - Christian Ouellet (1)		Third period	No scoring
Christopher Gibson (27 saves / 28 shots)		Goalie stats	Robert Steeves (29 saves / 32 shots)

March 24	Chicoutimi Saguenéens	6 – 1	Acadie–Bathurst Titan	Centre Georges-Vézina	Recap
3:00 - Lukáš Sedlák (1); 4:14 - Steve Lebel (1)		First period	No scoring
1:42 - pp - Christian Ouellet (2); 12:36 - Christian Ouellet (3)		Second period	No scoring
1:45 - Charles Hudon (1); 13:27 - sh - Christian Ouellet (4)		Third period	Étienne Salvail (1) - 1:59
Christopher Gibson (25 saves / 26 shots)		Goalie stats	Robert Steeves (12 saves / 16 shots); Jacob Brennan (8 saves / 10 shots)

March 27	Acadie–Bathurst Titan	6 – 5	OT	Chicoutimi Saguenéens	K. C. Irving Regional Centre	Recap
15:16 - pp - Matt Bissonnette		First period		Charles Hudon (2) - 3:36; Lukáš Sedlák (2) - 14:35; Lukáš Sedlák (3) - 18:23
1:49 - pp - Mirko Höfflin (1); 6:39 - Sean Girard (1); 18:58 - François Godin (1)		Second period		Christian Ouellet (5) - 8:52; Étienne Brodeur (1) - pp - 14:32
12:58 - pp - Zach O'Brien (1)		Third period		No scoring
2:54 - Alec Jon Banville (1)		First overtime period		No scoring
Robert Steeves (22 saves / 27 shots)		Goalie stats		Christopher Gibson (30 saves / 36 shots)

March 28	Acadie–Bathurst Titan	2 – 4	Chicoutimi Saguenéens	K. C. Irving Regional Centre	Recap
17:08 - pp - Christophe Losier (1)		First period	No scoring
No scoring		Second period	Charles Hudon (3) - pp - 0:50; Andrew O'Brien (1) - 1:20
13:46 - Sébastien Trudeau (1)		Third period	Guillaume Asselin (3) - pp - 1:38; Alexandre Beauregard (1) - 5:36
Robert Steeves (22 saves / 26 shots)		Goalie stats	Christopher Gibson (19 saves / 21 shots)

March 30	Chicoutimi Saguenéens	2 – 3	OT	Acadie–Bathurst Titan	Centre Georges-Vézina	Recap
2:26 - Steve Lebel (2)		First period		No scoring
No scoring		Second period		No scoring
17:07 - pp - Étienne Brodeur (2)		Third period		Christophe Losier (2) - 8:52; Christophe Lalancette (1) - 14:30
No scoring		First overtime period		Sébastien Trudeau (2) - 15:34
Christopher Gibson (39 saves / 42 shots)		Goalie stats		Robert Steeves (27 saves / 29 shots)

April 1	Acadie–Bathurst Titan	3 – 4	OT	Chicoutimi Saguenéens	K. C. Irving Regional Centre	Recap
No scoring		First period		Christian Ouellet (6) - 9:43
0:13 - Sébastien Trudeau (3); 5:59 - Jordan Murray (1)		Second period		Steve Lebel (3) - 3:55
16:33 - Mirko Höfflin (2)		Third period		Jérémy Grégoire (1) - 12:34
No scoring		First overtime period		Alexandre Roy (1) - 7:09
Robert Steeves (29 saves / 33 shots)		Goalie stats		Christopher Gibson (27 saves / 30 shots)

Chicoutimi won series 4 – 2

== Quarter-finals ==
=== (1) Saint John Sea Dogs vs. (13) Baie-Comeau Drakkar ===
April 6	Saint John Sea Dogs	9 – 3	Baie-Comeau Drakkar	Harbour Station	Recap
17:49 - pp - Charlie Coyle (10)		First period	No scoring
5:34 - Tomáš Jurčo (4); 10:43 - Stephen MacAulay (3); 11:16 - Stephen MacAulay (4); 14:41 - Zack Phillips (3); 18:46 - Stanislav Galiev (4)		Second period	Carl Gélinas (3) - pp - 4:04; Carl Gélinas (4) - pp - 6:31
5:11 - Danick Gauthier (6); 7:35 - pp - Zack Phillips (4); 9:18 - pp - Ryan Tesink (2)		Third period	Lukáš Cingel (3) - 11:25
Mathieu Corbeil-Thériault (20 saves / 23 shots)		Goalie stats	Philippe Cadorette (20 saves / 28 shots); Jimmy Appleby (3 saves / 4 shots)

April 7	Saint John Sea Dogs	10 – 2	Baie-Comeau Drakkar	Harbour Station	Recap
2:48 - Kevin Gagné (2); 9:48 - pp - Charles-Olivier Roussel (2)		First period	No scoring
1:20 - pp - Tomáš Jurčo (5); 5:09 - Tomáš Jurčo (6); 6:20 - pp - Jonathan Huberdeau (3); 9:54 - Stanislav Galiev (5); 12:41 - pp - Zack Phillips (5)		Second period	Jonathan Lessard (5) - 10:40
1:28 - pp - Zack Phillips (6); 13:33 - Stanislav Galiev (6); 19:19 - Danick Gauthier (7)		Third period	David Rose (4) - pp - 5:14
Mathieu Corbeil-Thériault (24 saves / 26 shots)		Goalie stats	Philippe Cadorette (12 saves / 18 shots); Jimmy Appleby (11 saves / 15 shots)

April 10	Baie-Comeau Drakkar	2 – 5	Saint John Sea Dogs	Centre Henry-Leonard	Recap
No scoring		First period	Stanislav Galiev (7) - 4:21
4:11 - Jonathan Lessard (6); 18:11 - David Rose (5)		Second period	Tomáš Jurčo (7) - 18:55
No scoring		Third period	Ryan Tesink (3) - 2:31; Jonathan Huberdeau (4) - 17:14; Stephen MacAulay (5) - en - 18:34
Philippe Cadorette (33 saves / 37 shots)		Goalie stats	Mathieu Corbeil-Thériault (29 saves / 31 shots)

April 11	Baie-Comeau Drakkar	3 – 5	Saint John Sea Dogs	Centre Henry-Leonard	Recap
2:46 - Lukáš Cingel (4)		First period	Charlie Coyle (11) - ps - 12:26
11:10 - Raphaël Bussières (3)		Second period	Ryan Tesink (4) - 5:15; Ryan Tesink (5) - 11:01; Jonathan Huberdeau (5) - pp - 12:40
11:06 - pp - David Rose (6)		Third period	Jonathan Huberdeau (6) - en - 19:55
Philippe Cadorette (40 saves / 44 shots)		Goalie stats	Mathieu Corbeil-Thériault (20 saves / 23 shots)

Saint John won series 4 – 0

=== (2) Shawinigan Cataractes vs. (8) Chicoutimi Saguenéens ===
April 6	Shawinigan Cataractes	6 – 7	OT	Chicoutimi Saguenéens	Centre Bionest	Recap
2:29 - Anton Zlobin (1); 11:51 - Morgan Ellis (3)		First period		Lukáš Sedlák (4) - 7:06
16:53 - Kirill Kabanov (3)		Second period		Christian Ouellet (7) - pp - 11:44
3:50 - sh - Loïk Poudrier (4); 4:44 - Anton Zlobin (2); 5:39 - Brandon Gormley (1)		Third period		Christian Ouellet (8) - 0:18; Jean-Gabriel Pageau (1) - sh - 10:51; Yoan Pinette (1) - 12:40; Guillaume Asselin (4) - 13:36
No scoring		First overtime period		Jean-Gabriel Pageau (2) - 10:05
Alex Dubeau (24 saves / 30 shots); Gabriel Girard (7 saves / 8 shots)		Goalie stats		Christopher Gibson (33 saves / 39 shots)

April 7	Shawinigan Cataractes	7 – 2	Chicoutimi Saguenéens	Centre Bionest	Recap
5:40 - Vincent Arseneau (2); 11:22 - Brandon Gormley (2)		First period	Yoan Pinette (2) - 18:36
9:06 - pp - Morgan Ellis (4); 14:12 - Mitchell Maynard (2); 16:55 - Loïk Poudrier (5)		Second period	No scoring
3:33 - Brandon Gormley (3); 9:24 - Jonathan Narbonne (1)		Third period	Guillaume Asselin (5) - pp - 3:10
Alex Dubeau (22 saves / 24 shots)		Goalie stats	Christopher Gibson (22 saves / 27 shots); Francis Desrosiers (11 saves / 13 shots)

April 10	Chicoutimi Saguenéens	1 – 2	Shawinigan Cataractes	Centre Georges-Vézina	Recap
10:38 - Charles Hudon (4)		First period	Michael Chaput (4) - 9:21; Pierre-Olivier Morin (2) - 14:04
No scoring		Second period	No scoring
No scoring		Third period	No scoring
Christopher Gibson (26 saves / 28 shots)		Goalie stats	Alex Dubeau (29 saves / 30 shots)

April 11	Chicoutimi Saguenéens	2 – 1	Shawinigan Cataractes	Centre Georges-Vézina	Recap
4:46 - sh - Christian Ouellet (9); 8:22 - Lukáš Sedlák (5)		First period	Vincent Arseneau (3) - 0:53
No scoring		Second period	No scoring
No scoring		Third period	No scoring
Christopher Gibson (30 saves / 31 shots)		Goalie stats	Alex Dubeau (26 saves / 28 shots)

April 13	Shawinigan Cataractes	7 – 3	Chicoutimi Saguenéens	Centre Bionest	Recap
3:18 - Vincent Arseneau (4); 14:25 - Alexandre Grand-Maison (1); 17:00 - Kirill Kabanov (4)		First period	Christian Ouellet (10) - pp - 2:49; Étienne Brodeur (3) - 15:18; Gabriel Vermette (1) - 19:11
No scoring		Second period	No scoring
12:33 - Pierre-Olivier Morin (3); 14:11 - Loïk Poudrier (6); 17:13 - en - Pierre-Olivier Morin (4); 18:35 - pp - Brandon Gormley (4)		Third period	No scoring
Alex Dubeau (24 saves / 27 shots)		Goalie stats	Christopher Gibson (34 saves / 40 shots)

April 15	Chicoutimi Saguenéens	2 – 0	Shawinigan Cataractes	Centre Georges-Vézina	Recap
17:00 - pp - Étienne Brodeur (4)		First period	No scoring
No scoring		Second period	No scoring
19:20 - en - Alexandre Beauregard (2)		Third period	No scoring
Christopher Gibson (33 saves / 33 shots)		Goalie stats	Alex Dubeau (26 saves / 27 shots)

April 17	Shawinigan Cataractes	2 – 3	Chicoutimi Saguenéens	Centre Bionest	Recap
8:06 - pp - Brandon Gormley (5)		First period	Christian Ouellet (11) - 1:49; Guillaume Asselin (6) - pp - 3:52
No scoring		Second period	No scoring
18:51 - Anton Zlobin (3)		Third period	Christian Ouellet (12) - 0:45
Alex Dubeau (14 saves / 17 shots)		Goalie stats	Christopher Gibson (28 saves / 30 shots)

Chicoutimi won series 4 – 3

=== (3) Blainville-Boisbriand Armada vs. (7) Rimouski Océanic ===
April 6	Blainville-Boisbriand Armada	3 – 5	Rimouski Océanic	Centre d'Excellence Sports Rousseau	Recap
2:16 - pp - Cédric Paquette (4)		First period	Pier-Luc Pelletier (1) - pp - 4:33
13:22 - pp - Marc-Olivier Roy (4); 14:29 - Olivier Hinse (1)		Second period	Francis Beauvillier (2) - sh - 6:51
No scoring		Third period	Francis Beauvillier (3) - 4:52; Peter Trainor (4) - 16:09; Petr Straka (3) - en - 18:47
Étienne Marcoux (35 saves / 39 shots)		Goalie stats	Jacob Gervais-Chouinard (14 saves / 17 shots)

April 7	Blainville-Boisbriand Armada	2 – 0	Rimouski Océanic	Centre d'Excellence Sports Rousseau	Recap
No scoring		First period	No scoring
Jess Tanguy (6) - pp - 4:03; Raphaël Pouliot (4) - pp - 13:20		Second period	No scoring
No scoring		Third period	No scoring
Étienne Marcoux (29 saves / 29 shots)		Goalie stats	Jacob Gervais-Chouinard (27 saves / 29 shots)

April 10	Rimouski Océanic	3 – 5	Blainville-Boisbriand Armada	Colisée de Rimouski	Recap
7:08 - Alex Belzile (3); 8:03 - pp - Jérôme Gauthier-Leduc (5); 16:19 - Alex Belzile (4)		First period	No scoring
No scoring		Second period	No scoring
No scoring		Third period	Jess Tanguy (7) - pp - 3:36; Cédric Paquette (5) - 4:05; Raphaël Pouliot (5) - 10:25; Cédric Paquette (6) - 16:16; Cédric Paquette (7) - 18:11
Jacob Gervais-Chouinard (32 saves / 37 shots)		Goalie stats	Étienne Marcoux (23 saves / 26 shots)

April 11	Rimouski Océanic	4 – 3	OT	Blainville-Boisbriand Armada	Colisée de Rimouski	Recap
15:37 - pp - Alex Belzile (5)		First period		No scoring
2:48 - Alexandre Mallet (4)		Second period		Xavier Ouellet (2) - pp - 4:04; Marc-Olivier Roy (5) - 10:47
7:23 - Peter Trainor (5)		Third period		Raphaël Pouliot (6) - 5:55
11:34 - Scott Oke (4)		First overtime period		No scoring
Jacob Gervais-Chouinard (17 saves / 20 shots); Carl Hozjan (14 saves / 14 shots)		Goalie stats		Étienne Marcoux (40 saves / 44 shots)

April 13	Blainville-Boisbriand Armada	3 – 2	Rimouski Océanic	Centre d'Excellence Sports Rousseau	Recap
No scoring		First period	Peter Trainor (6) - 7:26
15:06 - pp - Xavier Ouellet (3)		Second period	Alexandre Mallet (5) - 7:45
9:41 - Jean-Christophe Laflamme (1); 18:06 - Tommy Giroux (5)		Third period	No scoring
Étienne Marcoux (30 saves / 32 shots)		Goalie stats	Carl Hozjan (25 saves / 28 shots)

April 15	Rimouski Océanic	3 – 2	Blainville-Boisbriand Armada	Colisée de Rimouski	Recap
No scoring		First period	Jess Tanguy (8) - 11:25
5:31 - Petr Straka (4); 8:29 - Robbie De Fulviis (1); 11:50 - pp - Peter Trainor (7)		Second period	No scoring
No scoring		Third period	Marc-Olivier Roy (6) - 19:25
Jacob Gervais-Chouinard (19 saves / 21 shots)		Goalie stats	Étienne Marcoux (23 saves / 26 shots)

April 17	Blainville-Boisbriand Armada	4 – 5	Rimouski Océanic	Centre d'Excellence Sports Rousseau	Recap
No scoring		First period	Alexandre Mallet (6) - 4:51; Alexandre Tanguay (1) - 17:36
4:43 - Vincent Richer (1); 10:53 - Tommy Giroux (6); 15:14 - Vincent Richer (2)		Second period	Jakub Culek (3) - 1:58; Alexandre Mallet (7) - 4:01
12:23 - Raphaël Pouliot (7)		Third period	Peter Trainor (8) - 12:46
Étienne Marcoux (26 saves / 31 shots)		Goalie stats	Jacob Gervais-Chouinard (21 saves / 25 shots); Carl Hozjan (3 saves / 3 shots)

Rimouski won series 4 – 3

=== (5) Quebec Remparts vs. (6) Halifax Mooseheads ===
April 6	Quebec Remparts	4 – 2	Halifax Mooseheads	Colisée Pepsi	Recap
No scoring		First period	No scoring
No scoring		Second period	Nathan MacKinnon (7) - 5:29
1:14 - Gabriel Desjardins (5); 2:38 - Martin Lefebvre (3); 2:49 - Jérémie Malouin (4); 19:56 - en - Anthony Duclair (2)		Third period	Darcy Ashley (1) - pp - 18:51
Louis Domingue (15 saves / 17 shots)		Goalie stats	Zachary Fucale (19 saves / 22 shots)

April 7	Quebec Remparts	4 – 3	OT	Halifax Mooseheads	Colisée Pepsi	Recap
No scoring		First period		Matthew Boudreau (1) - pp - 10:54
7:26 - pp - Mikhail Grigorenko (2)		Second period		Nathan MacKinnon (8) - pp - 11:58
4:56 - pp - Gabriel Desjardins (6); 19:40 - pp - Logan Shaw (5)		Third period		Nathan MacKinnon (9) - 14:58
6:02 - Jérémie Malouin (5)		First overtime period		No scoring
Louis Domingue (16 saves / 19 shots)		Goalie stats		Zachary Fucale (32 saves / 36 shots)

April 10	Halifax Mooseheads	3 – 5	Quebec Remparts	Halifax Metro Centre	Recap
8:18 - pp - Konrad Abeltshauser (2)		First period	Michael McNamee (2) - 10:08
6:35 - pp - Matthew Boudreau (2); 9:10 - Alexandre Grenier (2)		Second period	Kurt Etchegary (1) - 9:51; Michael McNamee (3) - 10:44
No scoring		Third period	Michael McNamee (4) - 7:42; Jérémie Malouin (6) - en - 19:30
Zachary Fucale (32 saves / 36 shots)		Goalie stats	Louis Domingue (19 saves / 22 shots)

April 11	Halifax Mooseheads	2 – 1	Quebec Remparts	Halifax Metro Centre	Recap
11:21 - Jonathan Drouin (5); 17:04 - Cameron Critchlow (4)		First period	No scoring
No scoring		Second period	Mikhail Grigorenko (3) - 2:46
No scoring		Third period	No scoring
Zachary Fucale (26 saves / 27 shots)		Goalie stats	Louis Domingue (31 saves / 33 shots)

April 13	Halifax Mooseheads	3 – 2	Quebec Remparts	Halifax Metro Centre	Recap
Cameron Critchlow (5) - 17:27		First period	No scoring
Trey Lewis (1) - 11:43		Second period	3:13 - pp - Martin Lefebvre (4)
Nathan MacKinnon (10) - 8:01		Third period	1:21 - Gabriel Desjardins (7)
Zachary Fucale (24 saves / 26 shots)		Goalie stats	Louis Domingue (36 saves / 39 shots)

April 16	Quebec Remparts	2 – 5	Halifax Mooseheads	Colisée Pepsi	Recap
Vincent Barnard (5) - pp - 4:35		First period	1:14 - Travis Randell (1); 18:22 - Konrad Abeltshauser (3)
No scoring		Second period	16:08 - Jonathan Drouin (6); 19:38 - pp - Nathan MacKinnon (11)
Alexandre Comtois (3) - 18:23		Third period	16:34 - pp - Jonathan Drouin (7)
Louis Domingue (24 saves / 28 shots)		Goalie stats	Zachary Fucale (33 saves / 34 shots); Marc-Olivier Daigle (0 saves / 1 shot)

April 17	Quebec Remparts	4 – 5	OT	Halifax Mooseheads	Colisée Pepsi	Recap
13:32 - Mikaël Tam (1)		First period		No scoring
1:28 - Anthony Duclair (3); 13:13 - pp - Logan Shaw (6)		Second period		Cameron Critchlow (6) - 3:53; Cameron Critchlow (7) - 16:45; Cameron Critchlow (8) - 19:16
6:19 - Adam Erne (2)		Third period		Cameron Critchlow (9) - pp - 12:35
No scoring		First overtime period		Jonathan Drouin (8) - 14:58
Louis Domingue (24 saves / 29 shots)		Goalie stats		Zachary Fucale (41 saves / 45 shots)

Halifax won series 4 – 3

== Semi-finals ==
=== (1) Saint John Sea Dogs vs. (8) Chicoutimi Saguenéens ===
April 20	Saint John Sea Dogs	4 – 1	Chicoutimi Saguenéens	Harbour Station	Recap
No scoring		First period	No scoring
17:02 - Pierre Durepos (1)		Second period	Mathieu Gagnon (1) - 6:16
2:18 - Stanislav Galiev (8); 3:39 - Jonathan Huberdeau (7); 10:12 - pp - Danick Gauthier (8)		Third period	No scoring
Mathieu Corbeil-Thériault (24 saves / 25 shots)		Goalie stats	Christopher Gibson (29 saves / 33 shots)

April 22	Saint John Sea Dogs	5 – 2	Chicoutimi Saguenéens	Harbour Station	Recap
2:33 - Aidan Kelly (3); 4:46 - pp - Stanislav Galiev (9)		First period	No scoring
0:41 - Ryan Tesink (6); 14:29 - sh - Jonathan Huberdeau (8)		Second period	Mathieu Gagnon (2) - 9:33
15:16 - Stanislav Galiev (10)		Third period	Christian Ouellet (13) - pp - 5;31
Mathieu Corbeil-Thériault (27 saves / 29 shots)		Goalie stats	Christopher Gibson (27 saves / 32 shots)

April 24	Chicoutimi Saguenéens	5 – 4	OT	Saint John Sea Dogs	Centre Georges-Vézina	Recap
14:09 - Charles Hudon (5); 19:45 - Jean-Gabriel Pageau (3)		First period		No scoring
No scoring		Second period		Nathan Beaulieu (3) - pp - 13:48; Tomáš Jurčo (8) - sh - 15:38
2:42 - Jean-Gabriel Pageau (4); 17:27 - Gabriel Bourret (1)		Third period		Ryan Tesink (7) - 2:27; Danick Gauthier (9) - 16:43
7:26 - Étienne Brodeur (5)		First overtime period		No scoring
Christopher Gibson (42 saves / 46 shots)		Goalie stats		Mathieu Corbeil-Thériault (28 saves / 33 shots)

April 26	Chicoutimi Saguenéens	2 – 3	OT	Saint John Sea Dogs	Centre Georges-Vézina	Recap
No scoring		First period		Charlie Coyle (12) - 18:04
6:38 - Jérémy Grégoire (2); 7:41 - Charles Hudon (6)		Second period		Jonathan Huberdeau (9) - 7:21
No scoring		Third period		No scoring
No scoring		First overtime period		Charlie Coyle (13) - 6:13
Christopher Gibson (28 saves / 31 shots)		Goalie stats		Mathieu Corbeil-Thériault (28 saves / 30 shots)

April 28	Saint John Sea Dogs	4 – 3	OT	Chicoutimi Saguenéens	Harbour Station	Recap
7:40 - pp - Charlie Coyle (14); 7:50 - Zack Phillips (7)		First period		Steve Lebel (4) - 18:57
No scoring		Second period		Dominic Poulin (1) - 12:35
9:21 - Stanislav Galiev (11)		Third period		Yoan Pinette (3) - 14:58
11:19 - Stanislav Galiev (12)		First overtime period		No scoring
Mathieu Corbeil-Thériault (38 saves / 41 shots)		Goalie stats		Christopher Gibson (39 saves / 43 shots)

Saint John won series 4 – 1

=== (6) Halifax Mooseheads vs. (7) Rimouski Océanic ===
April 20	Halifax Mooseheads	1 – 4	Rimouski Océanic	Halifax Metro Centre	Recap
No scoring		First period	Casey Babineau (1) - 11:11
18:00 - Cameron Critchlow (10)		Second period	Scott Oke (5) - 2:04; Alexandre Mallet (8) - 14:53
No scoring		Third period	Petr Straka (5) - 3:01
Zachary Fucale (10 saves / 14 shots)		Goalie stats	Jacob Gervais-Chouinard (29 saves / 30 shots)

April 21	Halifax Mooseheads	4 – 5	Rimouski Océanic	Halifax Metro Centre	Recap
0:58 - Konrad Abeltshauser (4); 13:23 - Andrew Ryan (1)		First period	Peter Trainor (9) - 11:21; Jean-Philippe Mathieu (1) - 14:44
No scoring		Second period	No scoring
0:39 - Nathan MacKinnon (12); 5:00 - Nathan MacKinnon (13)		Third period	Jean-François Plante (4) - 1:54; Jakub Culek (4) - 5:32; Jérôme Gauthier-Leduc (6) - pp - 19:04
Zachary Fucale (34 saves / 39 shots)		Goalie stats	Jacob Gervais-Chouinard (23 saves / 27 shots)

April 24	Rimouski Océanic	3 – 4	Halifax Mooseheads	Colisée de Rimouski	Recap
3:23 - Robbie De Fulviis (2); 13:36 - Petr Straka (6)		First period	Brendan Duke (1) - 2:44; Jonathan Drouin (9) - 6:02; Brent Andrews (2) - 11:09
9:30 - Jérôme Gauthier-Leduc (7)		Second period	Martin Frk (5) - pp - 18:38
No scoring		Third period	No scoring
Jacob Gervais-Chouinard (6 saves / 9 shots); Carl Hozjan (11 saves / 12 shots)		Goalie stats	Zachary Fucale (24 saves / 27 shots)

April 25	Rimouski Océanic	1 – 3	Halifax Mooseheads	Colisée de Rimouski	Recap
8:18 - Alex Belzile (6)		First period	Cameron Critchlow (11) - pp - 11:39
No scoring		Second period	Alexandre Grenier (3) - pp - 13:07
No scoring		Third period	Cameron Critchlow (12) - pp - 11:04
Jacob Gervais-Chouinard (26 saves / 29 shots)		Goalie stats	Zachary Fucale (34 saves / 35 shots)

April 27	Rimouski Océanic	9 – 0	Halifax Mooseheads	Colisée de Rimouski	Recap
Peter Trainor (10) - 1:50; Jean-François Plante (5) - 6:50; Scott Oke (6) - 13:43		First period	No scoring
Jean-Philippe Mathieu (2) - pp - 11:04; Francis Beauvillier (4) - sh - 13:17; Petr Straka (7) - 14:26; Jérôme Gauthier-Leduc (8) - pp - 16:07		Second period	No scoring
Alexandre Mallet (9) - 11:41; Jonathan Lavoie (1) - sh - 18:44		Third period	No scoring
Jacob Gervais-Chouinard (30 saves / 30 shots)		Goalie stats	Zachary Fucale (18 saves / 24 shots); Marc-Olivier Daigle (12 saves / 15 shots)

April 29	Halifax Mooseheads	2 – 3	OT	Rimouski Océanic	Halifax Metro Centre	Recap
No scoring		First period		16:04 - Peter Trainor (11)
Alexandre Grenier (4) - 7:27; Konrad Abeltshauser (5) - pp - 9:45		Second period		No scoring
No scoring		Third period		15:47 - Scott Oke (7)
No scoring		First overtime period		8:02 - Robbie De Fulviis (3)
Zachary Fucale (42 saves / 45 shots)		Goalie stats		Jacob Gervais-Chouinard (19 saves / 21 shots)

Rimouski wins series 4 – 2

== QMJHL Championship ==
=== (1) Saint John Sea Dogs vs. (7) Rimouski Océanic ===
May 4	Saint John Sea Dogs	3 – 2	2OT	Rimouski Océanic	Harbour Station	Recap
0:45 - Nathan Beaulieu (4); 1:12 - Tomáš Jurčo (9)		First period		No scoring
No scoring		Second period		Peter Trainor (12) - pp - 5:52; Alex Belzile (7) - pp - 13:20
No scoring		Third period		No scoring
10:18 - Zack Phillips (8)		Second overtime period		No scoring
Mathieu Corbeil-Thériault (40 saves / 42 shots)		Goalie stats		Jacob Gervais-Chouinard (41 saves / 44 shots)

May 5	Saint John Sea Dogs	3 – 2	Rimouski Océanic	Harbour Station	Recap
No scoring		First period	No scoring
6:12 - Danick Gauthier (10); 7:02 - pp - Tomáš Jurčo (10); 11:36 - ps - Charlie Coyle (15)		Second period	Petr Straka (8) - 15:50
No scoring		Third period	Petr Straka (9) - 18:56
Mathieu Corbeil-Thériault (14 saves / 16 shots)		Goalie stats	Jacob Gervais-Chouinard (29 saves / 32 shots)

May 9	Rimouski Océanic	4 – 6	Saint John Sea Dogs	Colisée de Rimouski	Recap
11:00 - pp - Jérôme Gauthier-Leduc (9)		First period	Charles-Olivier Roussel (3) - 8:53
No scoring		Second period	Stephen MacAulay (6) - 17:30; Danick Gauthier (11) - 18:03
0:18 - Alexandre Mallet (10); 11:03 - Petr Straka (10); 16:05 - Francis Beauvillier (5)		Third period	Stanislav Galiev (13) - 0:35; Danick Gauthier (12) - 1:31; Tomáš Jurčo (11) - 18:01
Jacob Gervais-Chouinard (15 saves / 20 shots); Carl Hozjan (3 saves / 4 shots)		Goalie stats	Mathieu Corbeil-Thériault (23 saves / 27 shots)

May 10	Rimouski Océanic	0 – 8	Saint John Sea Dogs	Colisée de Rimouski	Recap
No scoring		First period	Tomáš Jurčo (12) - 4:14; Zack Phillips (9) - 11:39; Danick Gauthier (13) - 12:29; Tomáš Jurčo (13) - 18:55; Stanislav Galiev (14) - 19:14
No scoring		Second period	Stanislav Galiev (15) - 3:49
No scoring		Third period	Stanislav Galiev (16) - 4:44; Jonathan Huberdeau (10) - 7:47
Jacob Gervais-Chouinard (21 saves / 26 shots); Carl Hozjan (6 saves / 9 shots)		Goalie stats	Mathieu Corbeil-Thériault (24 saves / 24 shots)

Saint John wins series 4 – 0

== Playoff scoring leaders ==
Note: GP = Games played; G = Goals; A = Assists; Pts = Points; PIM = Penalty minutes

Player	Team	GP	G	A	Pts	PIM
Stanislav Galiev	Saint John Sea Dogs	17	16	18	34	6
Charlie Coyle	Saint John Sea Dogs	17	15	19	34	8
Zack Phillips	Saint John Sea Dogs	17	9	23	32	4
Tomáš Jurčo	Saint John Sea Dogs	16	13	16	29	12
Nathan MacKinnon	Halifax Mooseheads	17	13	15	28	12
Jonathan Drouin	Halifax Mooseheads	17	9	17	26	4
Alexandre Mallet	Rimouski Océanic	21	10	15	25	22
Alex Belzile	Rimouski Océanic	21	7	18	25	28
Petr Straka	Rimouski Océanic	21	10	12	22	6
Danick Gauthier	Saint John Sea Dogs	17	13	8	21	28
Jonathan Huberdeau	Saint John Sea Dogs	15	10	11	21	18

== Playoff leading goaltenders ==
Note: GP = Games played; Mins = Minutes played; W = Wins; L = Losses; GA = Goals Allowed; SO = Shutouts; SV& = Save percentage; GAA = Goals against average

Player	Team	GP	Mins	W	L	GA	SO	Sv%	GAA
Alex Dubeau	Shawinigan Cataractes	7	374	3	4	13	0	0.919	2.08
Mathieu Corbeil-Thériault	Saint John Sea Dogs	17	1075	16	1	39	1	0.917	2.18
Louis Domingue	Quebec Remparts	11	679	7	4	30	0	0.897	2.65
Étienne Marcoux	Blainville-Boisbriand Armada	11	673	7	4	32	1	0.897	2.85
Gabriel Girard	Shawinigan Cataractes	5	293	4	0	14	0	0.886	2.86

== Trophies and awards ==
Team

- President's Cup: Saint John Sea Dogs
- Jean Rougeau Trophy - Regular Season Champions: Saint John Sea Dogs
- Luc Robitaille Trophy - Team that scored the most goals: Victoriaville Tigres
- Robert Lebel Trophy - Team with best GAA: Shawinigan Cataractes

Player

- Michel Brière Memorial Trophy - Most Valuable Player: Yanni Gourde, Victoriaville Tigres
- Jean Béliveau Trophy - Top Scorer: Yanni Gourde, Victoriaville Tigres
- Guy Lafleur Trophy - Playoff MVP: Charlie Coyle, Saint John Sea Dogs
- Jacques Plante Memorial Trophy - Top Goaltender: Mathieu Corbeil-Thériault, Saint John Sea Dogs
- Guy Carbonneau Trophy - Best Defensive Forward: Frederick Roy, Quebec Remparts
- Emile Bouchard Trophy - Defenceman of the Year: Jérôme Gauthier-Leduc, Rimouski Océanic
- Kevin Lowe Trophy - Best Defensive Defenceman: Morgan Ellis, Shawinigan Cataractes
- Mike Bossy Trophy - Top Prospect: Mikhail Grigorenko, Quebec Remparts
- RDS Cup - Rookie of the Year: Mikhail Grigorenko, Quebec Remparts
- Michel Bergeron Trophy - Offensive Rookie of the Year: Mikhail Grigorenko, Quebec Remparts
- Raymond Lagacé Trophy - Defensive Rookie of the Year: Zachary Fucale, Halifax Mooseheads
- Frank J. Selke Memorial Trophy - Most sportsmanlike player: Zach O'Brien, Acadie–Bathurst Titan
- QMJHL Humanitarian of the Year - Humanitarian of the Year:
- Marcel Robert Trophy - Best Scholastic Player: Jonathan Brunelle, Cape Breton Screaming Eagles
- Paul Dumont Trophy - Personality of the Year: Jonathan Huberdeau, Saint John Sea Dogs

Executive

- Ron Lapointe Trophy - Coach of the Year: Jean-François Houle, Blainville-Boisbriand Armada
- Maurice Filion Trophy - General Manager of the Year: Joël Bouchard, Blainville-Boisbriand Armada
- John Horman Trophy - Executive of the Year: Paul MacDonald, Cape Breton Screaming Eagles
- Jean Sawyer Trophy - Marketing Director of the Year: Travis Kennedy & Brian Urquhart, Halifax Mooseheads

All-Star Teams

First All-Star Team:

- Roman Will, Goaltender, Moncton Wildcats
- Jérôme Gauthier-Leduc, Defenceman, Rimouski Océanic
- Xavier Ouellet, Defenceman, Blainville-Boisbriand Armada
- Mikhail Grigorenko, Centre, Quebec Remparts
- Yanni Gourde, Left Wing, Victoriaville Tigres
- Frederick Roy, Right Wing, Quebec Remparts

Second All-Star Team:

- Mathieu Corbeil-Thériault, Goaltender, Saint John Sea Dogs
- Morgan Ellis, Defenceman, Cape Breton Screaming Eagles/Shawinigan Cataractes
- Nathan Beaulieu, Defenceman, Saint John Sea Dogs
- Zach O'Brien, Centre, Acadie–Bathurst Titan
- Jonathan Huberdeau, Left Wing, Saint John Sea Dogs
- Sébastien Trudeau, Right Wing, Acadie–Bathurst Titan

All-Rookie Team:

- Zachary Fucale, Goaltender, Halifax Mooseheads
- Nikolas Brouillard, Defenceman, Drummondville Voltigeurs
- Samuel Morin, Defenceman, Rimouski Océanic
- Mikhail Grigorenko, Centre, Quebec Remparts
- Anthony Duclair, Left Wing, Quebec Remparts
- Sven Andrighetto, Right Wing, Rouyn-Noranda Huskies

== See also ==
- 2012 Memorial Cup
- List of QMJHL seasons
- 2011–12 OHL season
- 2011–12 WHL season
- 2011 in ice hockey
- 2012 in ice hockey

Preceded by 2010–11 QMJHL season	QMJHL seasons	Succeeded by 2012–13 QMJHL season
