= Jérôme Gauthier-Leduc =

Canadian ice hockey player

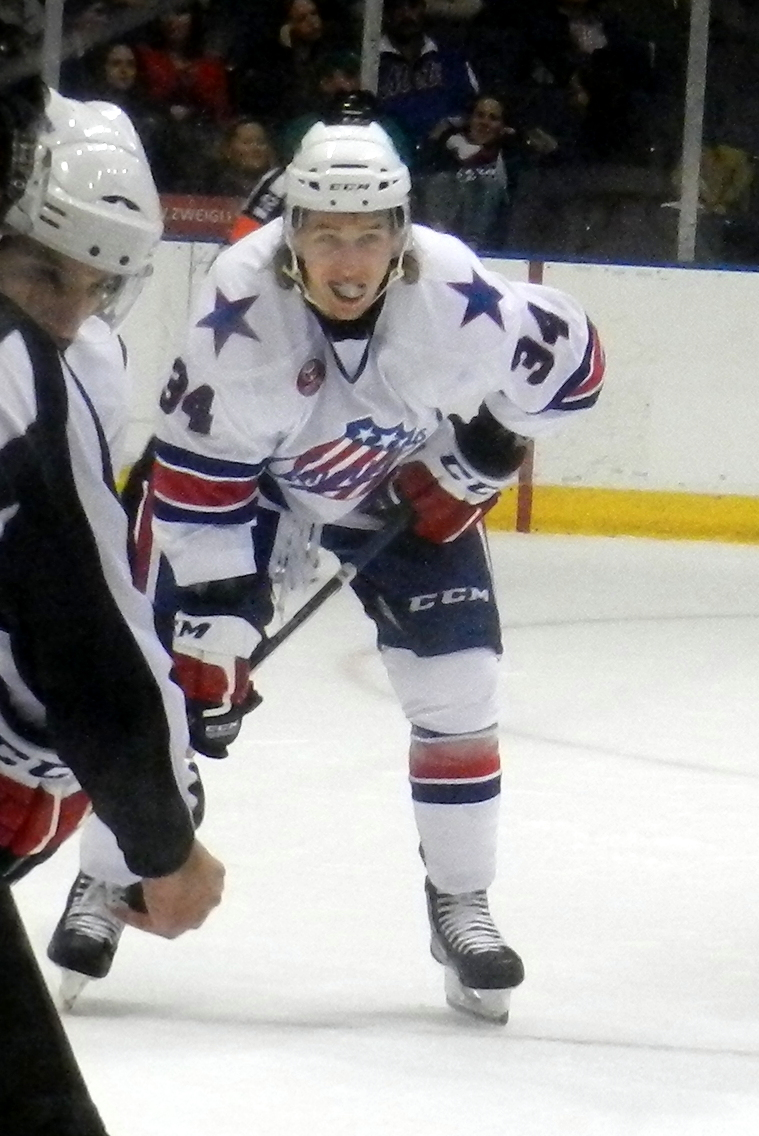
- Gauthier-Leduc with the Rochester Americans in 2013
- Born: July 30, 1992 (age 34) Quebec City, Quebec, Canada
- Height: 6 ft 1 in (185 cm)
- Weight: 194 lb (88 kg; 13 st 12 lb)
- Position: Defence
- Shoots: Right
- Ligue Nord-Américaine de Hockey team Former teams: Thetford Assurancia; Rochester Americans; Binghamton Senators; HC Dynamo Pardubice; Belfast Giants; Dornbirn Bulldogs; Västerås IK; Vienna Capitals; HC Ajoie
- NHL draft: 68th overall, 2010; Buffalo Sabres
- Playing career: 2012–present

Jérôme Gauthier-Leduc (born July 30, 1992) is a Canadian professional ice hockey defenceman currently playing for the Thetford Assurancia of the Ligue Nord-Américaine de Hockey (LNAH).

== Playing career ==
Gauthier-Leduc was selected by the Buffalo Sabres in the third round (68th overall) of the 2010 NHL entry draft.

In the 2015–16 season, after 57 games with the Sabres AHL affiliate, the Rochester Americans he was traded to the Ottawa Senators as part of a seven-player deal on February 27, 2016. He was directly assigned to AHL affiliate, the Binghamton Senators for the remainder of the year.

As a free agent in the off-season, Leduc was unable to attract an NHL contract, and on August 27, 2016, he opted to sign a one-year contract abroad with Czech club, HC Dynamo Pardubice of the ELH. In February 2017, Leduc agreed a move to the Belfast Giants of the UK's Elite Ice Hockey League, penning a deal until the end of the season.

Leduc left Belfast in June 2017 to sign for Austrian club, Dornbirn Bulldogs of the EBEL. He played two seasons with the Bulldogs before continuing his European career in Sweden, agreeing as a free agent to a one-year Allsvenskan contract with Västerås IK on July 17, 2019.

In 2020, Leduc returned to Austria to sign for the Vienna Capitals.

On June 11, 2021, Leduc joined newly promoted HC Ajoie of the National League (NL) on a two-year deal.

== Career statistics ==
=== Regular season and playoffs ===
			Regular season					Playoffs
Season	Team	League	GP	G	A	Pts	PIM	GP	G	A	Pts	PIM
2007–08	Séminaire St-François Blizzard	QMAAA	43	10	12	22	10	17	2	6	8	26
2008–09	Rouyn-Noranda Huskies	QMJHL	52	1	16	17	8	6	0	2	2	5
2009–10	Rouyn-Noranda Huskies	QMJHL	68	20	26	46	16	11	2	4	6	2
2010–11	Rimouski Océanic	QMJHL	61	18	38	56	26	5	1	2	3	6
2011–12	Rimouski Océanic	QMJHL	62	28	46	74	41	21	9	10	19	12
2012–13	Rochester Americans	AHL	47	3	3	6	8	3	0	0	0	0
2013–14	Rochester Americans	AHL	51	3	7	10	22	4	0	1	1	0
2013–14	Gwinnett Gladiators	ECHL	8	1	3	4	2	—	—	—	—	—
2014–15	Rochester Americans	AHL	76	6	19	25	59	—	—	—	—	—
2015–16	Rochester Americans	AHL	54	7	9	16	28	—	—	—	—	—
2015–16	Binghamton Senators	AHL	22	4	6	10	6	—	—	—	—	—
2016–17	HC Dynamo Pardubice	ELH	41	4	5	9	63	—	—	—	—	—
2016–17	Belfast Giants	EIHL	11	5	7	12	4	3	1	1	2	2
2017–18	Dornbirn Bulldogs	EBEL	43	6	19	25	20	6	1	4	5	2
2018–19	Dornbirn Bulldogs	EBEL	52	5	27	32	32	—	—	—	—	—
2019–20	Västerås IK	Allsv	50	6	34	40	34	1	0	0	0	0
2020–21	Vienna Capitals	ICEHL	48	6	27	33	44	8	1	2	3	12
2021–22	HC Ajoie	NL	31	7	14	21	24	—	—	—	—	—
2022–23	HC Ajoie	NL	29	4	10	14	18	—	—	—	—	—
AHL totals			253	23	44	67	123	7	0	1	1	0

=== International ===
Year	Team	Event	Result	GP	G	A	Pts	PIM
2009	Canada Quebec	U17	5th	5	0	2	2	0
Junior totals				5	0	2	2	0

== Awards and honours ==
Award	Year
CHL Top Prospects Game - Team Bobby Orr	2010
