= Alexandre Mallet =

Canadian ice hockey player

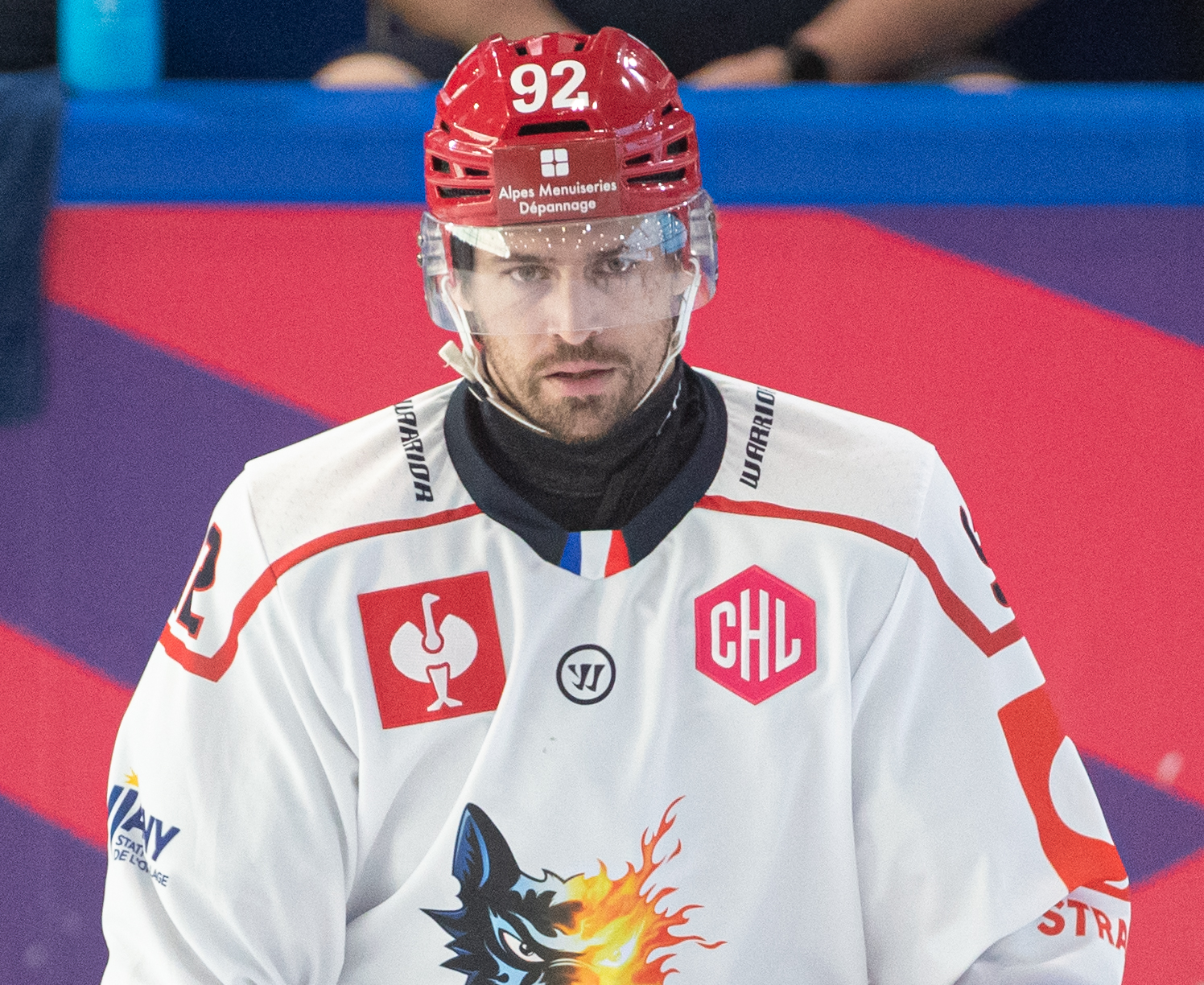
- Mallet in 2025
- Born: May 22, 1992 (age 34) Amqui, Quebec, Canada
- Height: 6 ft 1 in (185 cm)
- Weight: 205 lb (93 kg; 14 st 9 lb)
- Position: Centre
- Shoots: Right
- Ligue Magnus team Former teams: Brûleurs de Loups; HC Dynamo Pardubice; HC Kometa Brno; HC Vítkovice; Grizzlys Wolfsburg; Dragons de Rouen
- NHL draft: 57th overall, 2012; Vancouver Canucks
- Playing career: 2013–present

Alexandre Mallet (born May 22, 1992) is a Canadian professional ice hockey forward currently playing for the Brûleurs de Loups of the Ligue Magnus.

== Playing career ==
Mallet began his major junior career in 2009 with the Rouyn-Noranda Huskies of the Quebec Major Junior Hockey League (QMJHL). He was traded to the Rimouski Océanic in 2010. After an impressive 2011–12 with the Océanic in which he scored 81 points in 68 games, Mallet was drafted by the Vancouver Canucks in the 2nd round (57th overall) in the 2012 NHL entry draft.

Mallet started his professional career with the then Canucks' American Hockey League (AHL) affiliate Chicago Wolves in the 2012–13 season. Unable to find his place on the roster, Mallet was sent down to the Kalamazoo Wings of the ECHL. On November 25, 2014 Mallet was traded along with a 2016 3rd Round Pick to the New York Islanders in exchange for defenceman Andrey Pedan.

Mallet played the remainder of the 2014–15 season with the Stockton Thunder, the Islanders ECHL affiliate. The Islanders did not tender a qualifying offer and at the end of the season, Mallet became a free agent. On August 3, 2015, Mallet was signed by his former team, the Kalamazoo Wings of the ECHL.

After four seasons in North America, Mallet opted to pursue a career abroad, agreeing to a one-year contract with Czech Liga outfit, HC Dynamo Pardubice on July 16, 2016. He moved to HC Kometa Brno, winning the Czech ELH Trophy in 2016–17, and winning it again in 2017–18.

After three seasons with Brno, Mallet left as a free agent to sign a one-year contract with fellow Czech club, HC Vítkovice Ridera, on August 20, 2019.

== Career statistics ==
			Regular season					Playoffs
Season	Team	League	GP	G	A	Pts	PIM	GP	G	A	Pts	PIM
2007–08	Collège Notre-Dame Albatros	QMAAA	33	11	10	21	50	3	0	0	0	4
2008–09	Collège Notre-Dame Albatros	QMAAA	39	15	13	28	50	4	2	4	6	0
2008–09	Rouyn-Noranda Huskies	QMJHL	10	1	0	1	0	1	0	1	1	0
2009–10	Rouyn-Noranda Huskies	QMJHL	39	4	5	9	31	—	—	—	—	—
2009–10	Rimouski Océanic	QMJHL	26	5	5	10	54	12	2	0	2	6
2010–11	Rimouski Océanic	QMJHL	60	10	9	19	86	5	0	2	2	7
2011–12	Rimouski Océanic	QMJHL	68	34	47	81	132	21	10	15	25	22
2012–13	Chicago Wolves	AHL	18	0	1	1	7	—	—	—	—	—
2012–13	Kalamazoo Wings	ECHL	44	10	19	29	48	—	—	—	—	—
2013–14	Utica Comets	AHL	59	1	4	5	46	—	—	—	—	—
2014–15	Kalamazoo Wings	ECHL	14	4	7	11	20	—	—	—	—	—
2014–15	Stockton Thunder	ECHL	40	9	13	22	49	—	—	—	—	—
2015–16	Kalamazoo Wings	ECHL	72	23	34	57	86	5	1	2	3	2
2016–17	HC Dynamo Pardubice	ELH	36	1	6	7	66	—	—	—	—	—
2016–17	HC Kometa Brno	ELH	8	1	3	4	43	14	4	3	7	4
2017–18	HC Kometa Brno	ELH	51	15	13	28	59	14	4	3	7	2
2018–19	HC Kometa Brno	ELH	49	6	6	12	106	10	0	0	0	8
2019–20	HC Vítkovice Ridera	ELH	52	14	10	24	44	—	—	—	—	—
AHL totals			77	1	5	6	53	—	—	—	—	—
ELH totals			144	23	28	52	274	38	8	6	14	14
