= Christopher Gibson =

Finnish ice hockey player

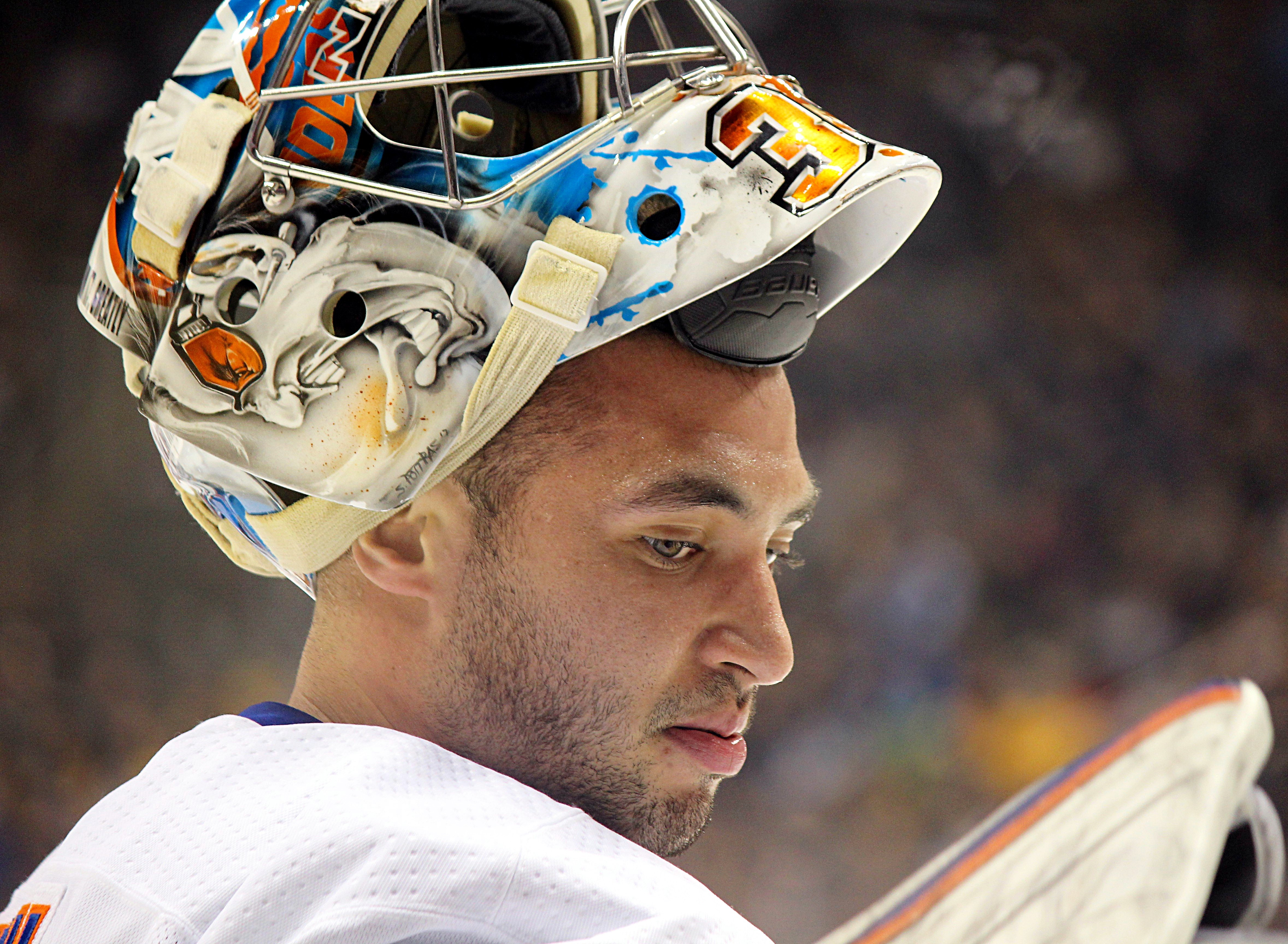
- Gibson with the New York Islanders in 2018
- Born: 27 December 1992 (age 33) Karkkila, Finland
- Height: 6 ft 1 in (185 cm)
- Weight: 188 lb (85 kg; 13 st 6 lb)
- Position: Goaltender
- Catches: Left
- DEL team Former teams: Schwenninger Wild Wings; Toronto Maple Leafs; New York Islanders; Tampa Bay Lightning; Florida Panthers; Seattle Kraken; Lukko; HC Nové Zámky; HC Bozen-Bolzano
- NHL draft: 49th overall, 2011; Los Angeles Kings
- Playing career: 2013–present

Christopher Gibson (born 27 December 1992) is a Finnish professional ice hockey goaltender for the Schwenninger Wild Wings in the Deutsche Eishockey Liga. Gibson was selected by the Los Angeles Kings in the second round (49th overall) of the 2011 NHL entry draft, although he never played for them, instead signing with the Toronto Maple Leafs, playing in their minor league system before a trade sent Gibson to the New York Islanders.

== Early life ==
Gibson was born in Karkkila, Finland to Peter, an artist and kick boxer from Saint Lucia, and a Finnish mother, Ulla Nurse. He was raised in Espoo, Finland before moving to Saskatchewan at age 15 to attend Notre Dame College.

== Playing career ==
In Gibson's first year at Notre Dame College, the Notre Dame Hounds (Midget AAA) won the Telus Cup national championship (2009).

Following that year at Notre Dame, Gibson was drafted by the Chicoutimi Saguenéens of the Quebec Major Junior Hockey League (QMJHL) in the first round (16th overall) of the 2009 CHL Import Draft.

Gibson was ranked as the number one goaltender from the QMJHL heading into the 2011 NHL entry draft. Selected at 49th overall by the Los Angeles Kings, Gibson was the first goaltender selected from the Canadian Hockey League in the 2011 draft. Unsigned by the Kings, he would re-enter the draft, but was signed by the Toronto Maple Leafs instead.

On 17 September 2015, Gibson was traded by the Maple Leafs, along with four other prospects, to the New York Islanders in exchange for Michael Grabner.

On 2 January 2016, Gibson got his first taste of NHL action coming in relief for Thomas Greiss. Gibson allowed one goal from Patric Hornqvist, but made 16 saves. On 6 April 2016, Gibson got his first NHL start and his first NHL win with the Islanders against the Washington Capitals. Gibson made 29 saves as the Islanders came back from a 3–1 deficit to win 4–3 in overtime. The win clinched the Islanders a spot in the 2016 playoffs.

On 15 August 2016, the Islanders re-signed Gibson to a one-year, two-way contract worth $660,000. On 11 March 2018, Gibson had a 50-save game against the Calgary Flames, becoming the first Islanders' rookie goaltender to do so since Billy Smith made 55 in 1972.

After five seasons within the Islanders organization, Gibson left as a free agent and was signed to a one-year, two-way contract with the Tampa Bay Lightning on 9 October 2020. In the pandemic delayed 2020–21 season, Gibson was initially rostered in the Lightning's taxi squad. He appeared in two games with the Lightning, recording a 1–1–0 record, a .875 save percentage and 2.66 goals against average and also played in two AHL games with the Syracuse Crunch, collecting 2 wins, .925 save percentage and 2.51 goals against average.

On July 28, 2021, Gibson signed as a free agent to a one-year, two-way contract worth $750,000 with the Florida Panthers. Gibson played exclusively with the Panthers affiliate, the Charlotte Checkers in the 2021-22 season, collecting 7 wins through 14 games.

As a free agent from the Panthers, Gibson went un-signed over the summer before accepting a professional tryout with the Arizona Coyotes. After attending the Coyotes training camp, Gibson was released without a contract during the pre-season on 30 September 2022. On October 14, 2022, Gibson was named to the Coachella Valley Firebirds opening roster for their inaugural season in 2022–23, by agreeing to join the AHL affiliate of the Seattle Kraken on a professional tryout contract. After appearing in one game with the Firebirds, Gibson was signed to an NHL contract by the Kraken, in agreeing to a one-year, two-way contract on October 27, 2022.

== International play ==
Medal record

Representing Finland

Ice hockey

IIHF World U18 Championship
| Bronze medal – third place | 2010 Belarus | |

At age 17, Gibson represented Finland at the 2010 IIHF World U18 Championships in Belarus, winning the bronze medal. Gibson was selected to the Finnish national junior team for the 2012 World Junior Championships in Canada. Gibson turned 19 years old during the tournament.

== Career statistics ==
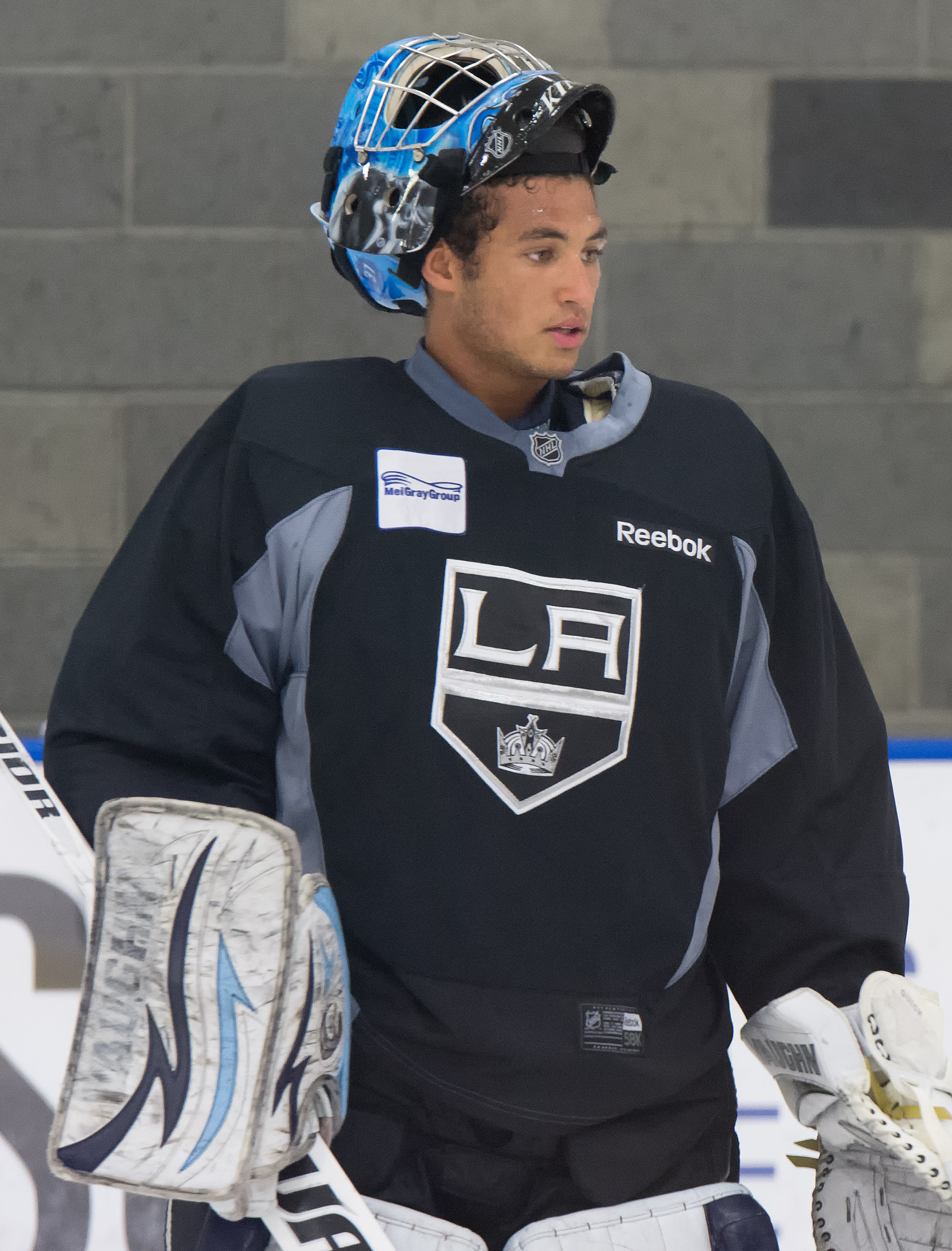
Gibson in 2012

| | | | Regular season | | | | | | | | | Playoffs |
| Season | Team | League | GP | W | L | T/OT | MIN | GA | SO | GAA | SV% | GP | W | L | MIN | GA | SO | GAA | SV% |
|---|---|---|---|---|---|---|---|---|---|---|---|---|---|---|---|---|---|---|---|
| 2008–09 | Notre Dame Hounds | SMHL | 18 | 16 | 1 | 0 | 1049 | 46 | 1 | 2.63 | .894 | 6 | 6 | 0 | 360 | 11 | 1 | 1.83 | .926 |
| 2009–10 | Chicoutimi Saguenéens | QMJHL | 29 | 8 | 19 | 0 | 1592 | 93 | 2 | 3.50 | .884 | 4 | 2 | 1 | 230 | 13 | 0 | 3.39 | .871 |
| 2010–11 | Chicoutimi Saguenéens | QMJHL | 37 | 14 | 15 | 8 | 2235 | 90 | 4 | 2.42 | .920 | 4 | 0 | 4 | 219 | 19 | 0 | 5.20 | .865 |
| 2011–12 | Chicoutimi Saguenéens | QMJHL | 48 | 27 | 17 | 4 | 2809 | 139 | 3 | 2.97 | .893 | 18 | 9 | 9 | 1116 | 58 | 1 | 3.12 | .903 |
| 2012–13 | Chicoutimi Saguenéens | QMJHL | 41 | 17 | 18 | 4 | 2279 | 117 | 4 | 3.08 | .902 | 6 | 2 | 4 | 356 | 23 | 0 | 3.87 | .898 |
| 2013–14 | Orlando Solar Bears | ECHL | 20 | 8 | 9 | 2 | 1178 | 62 | 0 | 3.16 | .892 | 2 | 1 | 1 | 123 | 4 | 0 | 1.94 | .951 |
| 2013–14 | Toronto Marlies | AHL | 12 | 5 | 6 | 0 | 640 | 26 | 0 | 2.44 | .916 | — | — | — | — | — | — | — | — |
| 2014–15 | Toronto Marlies | AHL | 45 | 24 | 17 | 3 | 2605 | 105 | 2 | 2.42 | .921 | 4 | 2 | 2 | 231 | 15 | 0 | 3.90 | .866 |
| 2015–16 | Bridgeport Sound Tigers | AHL | 42 | 19 | 11 | 6 | 2351 | 106 | 2 | 2.70 | .909 | 1 | 0 | 1 | 59 | 6 | 0 | 6.15 | .860 |
| 2015–16 | New York Islanders | NHL | 4 | 1 | 1 | 1 | 195 | 11 | 0 | 3.40 | .882 | — | — | — | — | — | — | — | — |
| 2016–17 | Bridgeport Sound Tigers | AHL | 7 | 6 | 0 | 0 | 380 | 16 | 0 | 2.52 | .912 | — | — | — | — | — | — | — | — |
| 2017–18 | Bridgeport Sound Tigers | AHL | 37 | 19 | 14 | 3 | 2131 | 86 | 4 | 2.42 | .906 | — | — | — | — | — | — | — | — |
| 2017–18 | New York Islanders | NHL | 8 | 2 | 3 | 2 | 427 | 26 | 0 | 3.65 | .908 | — | — | — | — | — | — | — | — |
| 2018–19 | Bridgeport Sound Tigers | AHL | 40 | 22 | 11 | 5 | 2201 | 104 | 1 | 2.84 | .902 | 4 | 2 | 2 | 283 | 9 | 0 | 1.91 | .927 |
| 2018–19 | New York Islanders | NHL | 2 | 0 | 0 | 0 | 40 | 1 | 0 | 1.50 | .941 | — | — | — | — | — | — | — | — |
| 2019–20 | Bridgeport Sound Tigers | AHL | 25 | 10 | 8 | 5 | 1380 | 64 | 2 | 2.78 | .914 | — | — | — | — | — | — | — | — |
| 2020–21 | Tampa Bay Lightning | NHL | 2 | 1 | 1 | 0 | 113 | 5 | 0 | 2.66 | .875 | — | — | — | — | — | — | — | — |
| 2020–21 | Syracuse Crunch | AHL | 2 | 2 | 0 | 0 | 120 | 5 | 0 | 2.51 | .925 | — | — | — | — | — | — | — | — |
| 2021–22 | Charlotte Checkers | AHL | 14 | 7 | 5 | 2 | 815 | 38 | 1 | 2.80 | .907 | 1 | 0 | 0 | 17 | 2 | 0 | 7.10 | .600 |
| 2022–23 | Coachella Valley Firebirds | AHL | 20 | 10 | 5 | 4 | 1105 | 55 | 2 | 2.99 | .894 | — | — | — | — | — | — | — | — |
| 2023–24 | Lukko | Liiga | 15 | 4 | 7 | 4 | 903 | 38 | 1 | 2.52 | .877 | 3 | 1 | 2 | 179 | 8 | 0 | 2.68 | .896 |
| 2024–25 | HC Nové Zámky | Slovak | 15 | 1 | 14 | 0 | 683 | 64 | 0 | 5.62 | .880 | — | — | — | — | — | — | — | — |
| 2024–25 | EC Kassel Huskies | DEL2 | 3 | 3 | 0 | 0 | 180 | 3 | 1 | 1.00 | .958 | 5 | 2 | 3 | 316 | 11 | 0 | 2.09 | .923 |
| 2025–26 | HC Bozen-Bolzano | ICEHL | 4 | 1 | 3 | 0 | 241 | 15 | 1 | 3.74 | .879 | — | — | — | — | — | — | — | — |
| NHL totals | | | 16 | 4 | 5 | 3 | 774 | 43 | 0 | 3.33 | .901 | — | — | — | — | — | — | — | — |
| Liiga totals | | | 15 | 4 | 7 | 4 | 903 | 38 | 1 | 2.52 | .877 | 3 | 1 | 2 | 179 | 8 | 0 | 2.68 | .896 |
| Slovakia totals | | | 15 | 1 | 14 | 0 | 683 | 64 | 0 | 5.62 | .880 | — | — | — | — | — | — | — | — |
| ICEHL totals | | | 4 | 1 | 3 | 0 | 241 | 15 | 1 | 3.74 | .879 | — | — | — | — | — | — | — | — |

== Awards and honours ==
| Award | Year |
QMJHL
| First All-Star Team | 2011 |
