= Andrey Pedan =

Lithuanian-Russian ice hockey player (born 1993)

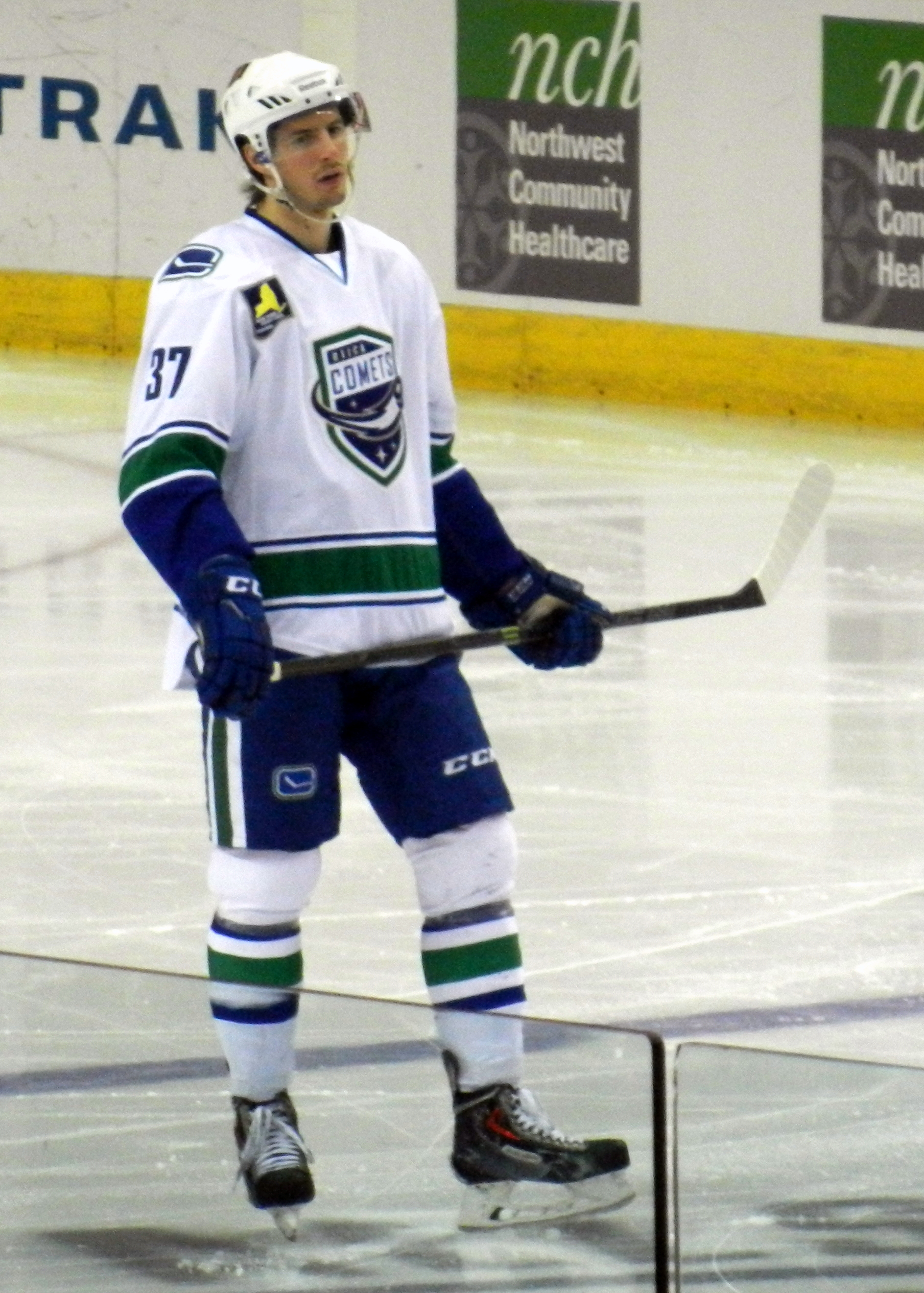
- Pedan playing for the Utica Comets in 2015
- Born: 3 July 1993 (age 33) Kaunas, Lithuania
- Height: 6 ft 5 in (196 cm)
- Weight: 215 lb (98 kg; 15 st 5 lb)
- Position: Defence
- Shoots: Left
- KHL team Former teams: SKA Saint Petersburg; Vancouver Canucks; Ak Bars Kazan; Dynamo Moscow
- NHL draft: 63rd overall, 2011; New York Islanders
- Playing career: 2012–present

Andrey Pedan (born 3 July 1993) is a Lithuanian-born Russian professional ice hockey defenceman for SKA Saint Petersburg of the Kontinental Hockey League (KHL).

== Playing career ==
After his first major junior season in the North American Ontario Hockey League, with the Guelph Storm in 2010–11, Pedan was drafted 63rd overall by the New York Islanders in the 2011 NHL entry draft.

On 3 April 2013, Pedan was signed to a three-year entry-level contract with the Islanders. Unable to establish himself amongst the Islanders' prospects within the affiliates, the Bridgeport Sound Tigers of the AHL and the Stockton Thunder of the ECHL, Pedan was traded in the 2014–15 season by the Islanders to the Vancouver Canucks in exchange for Alexandre Mallet and a third-round pick on 26 November 2014.

On 1 December 2015, Pedan made his NHL debut for the Canucks against the Los Angeles Kings. On 15 March 2016, Pedan was recalled by the Canucks along with Brendan Gaunce.

On 3 October 2017, on the eve of the 2017–18 season, Pedan was traded by the Canucks along with a fourth-round pick in 2018 to the Pittsburgh Penguins in exchange for Derrick Pouliot. He was assigned to AHL affiliate, the Wilkes-Barre/Scranton Penguins for the duration of the campaign. He notched AHL personal highs of 9 goals and 26 points in 52 games.

On 4 July 2018, Pedan, as a restricted free agent from the Penguins, opted to sign a two-year contract to return to Russia with reigning champions, Ak Bars Kazan of the Kontinental Hockey League (KHL). On 29 April 2020, Pedan was re-signed to a one-year contract.

On 4 May 2021, Pedan signed a two-year contract with HC Dynamo Moscow of the KHL.

Following the conclusion of the 2021–22 season, Pedan was traded with a year remaining on his contract to SKA Saint Petersburg in exchange for Alexander Skorenov on 25 May 2022.

== Personal life ==
Pedan was born in Kaunas, Lithuania, but grew up in Moscow, Russia. Pedan is fluent in both Russian and English.

== Career statistics ==
=== Regular season and playoffs ===
			Regular season					Playoffs
Season	Team	League	GP	G	A	Pts	PIM	GP	G	A	Pts	PIM
2010–11	Guelph Storm	OHL	51	2	10	12	89	6	0	8	8	8
2011–12	Guelph Storm	OHL	63	10	30	40	152	6	1	3	4	14
2012–13	Guelph Storm	OHL	60	14	30	44	145	5	3	1	4	16
2012–13	Bridgeport Sound Tigers	AHL	8	0	2	2	7	—	—	—	—	—
2013–14	Bridgeport Sound Tigers	AHL	28	5	5	10	43	—	—	—	—	—
2013–14	Stockton Thunder	ECHL	5	0	0	0	6	2	0	0	0	0
2014–15	Bridgeport Sound Tigers	AHL	6	0	3	3	51	—	—	—	—	—
2014–15	Stockton Thunder	ECHL	2	0	1	1	2	—	—	—	—	—
2014–15	Utica Comets	AHL	42	3	11	14	70	—	—	—	—	—
2015–16	Utica Comets	AHL	45	7	14	21	87	4	0	0	0	10
2015–16	Vancouver Canucks	NHL	13	0	0	0	18	—	—	—	—	—
2016–17	Utica Comets	AHL	52	5	5	10	100	—	—	—	—	—
2017–18	Wilkes-Barre/Scranton Penguins	AHL	52	9	17	26	87	3	1	1	2	4
2018–19	Ak Bars Kazan	KHL	37	2	10	12	44	3	0	0	0	10
2019–20	Ak Bars Kazan	KHL	37	6	10	16	32	4	0	1	1	2
2020–21	Ak Bars Kazan	KHL	52	6	11	17	87	14	1	2	3	4
2021–22	Dynamo Moscow	KHL	32	3	7	10	18	7	0	1	1	10
2022–23	SKA Saint Petersburg	KHL	64	5	15	20	43	16	2	3	5	27
2023–24	SKA Saint Petersburg	KHL	13	1	2	3	11	1	0	0	0	0
2024–25	SKA Saint Petersburg	KHL	43	1	12	13	20	5	0	3	3	11
2025–26	SKA Saint Petersburg	KHL	49	5	10	15	42	5	2	0	2	10
NHL totals			13	0	0	0	18	—	—	—	—	—
KHL totals			327	29	77	106	297	55	5	10	15	74

=== International ===
Year	Team	Event	Result	GP	G	A	Pts	PIM
2011	Russia	U18	3rd place, bronze medalist(s)	6	0	2	2	25
Junior totals				6	0	2	2	25
