= Petr Straka =

Czech ice hockey player

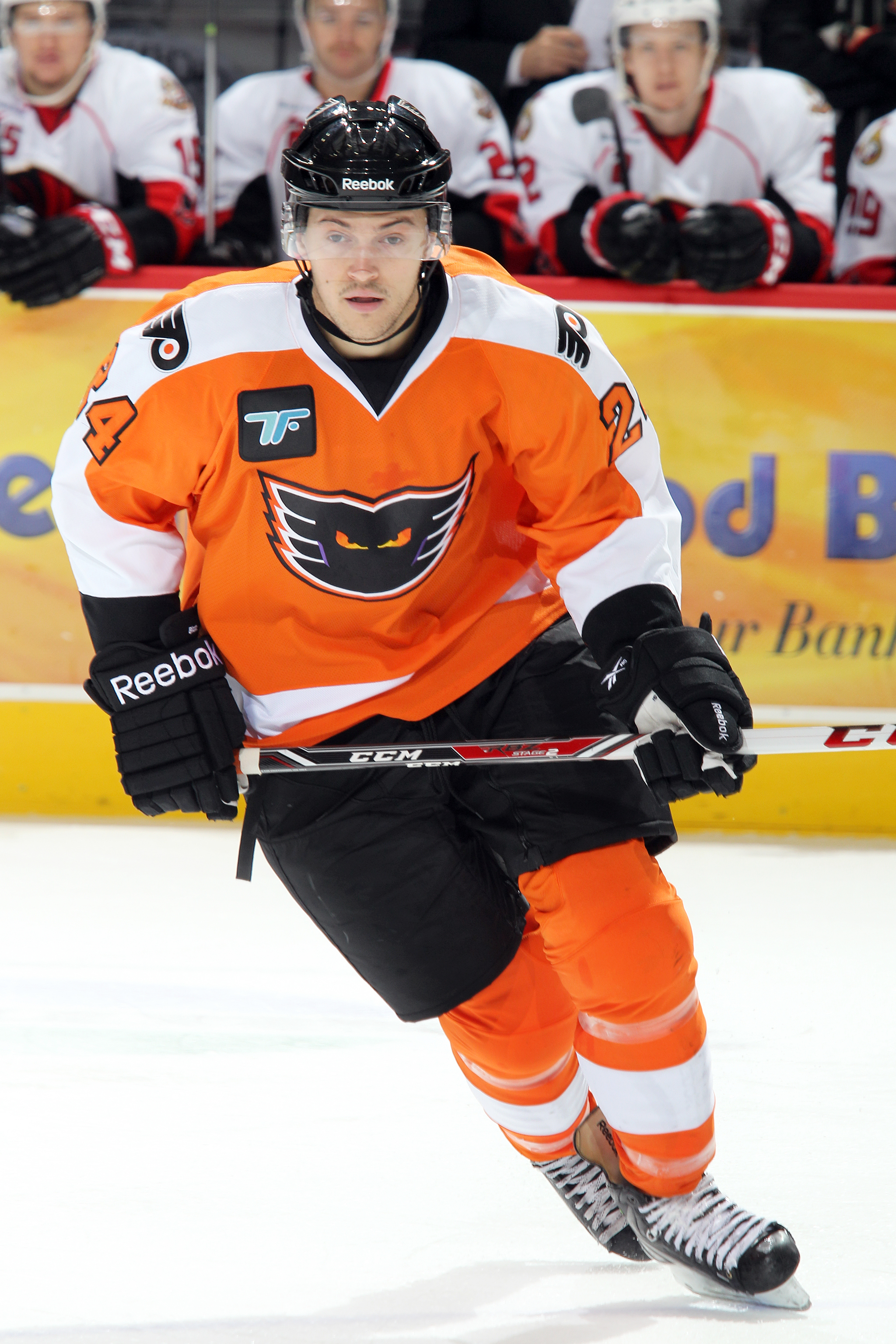
- Straka with the Adirondack Phantoms in 2013
- Born: June 15, 1992 (age 34) Plzeň, Czechoslovakia
- Height: 6 ft 1 in (185 cm)
- Weight: 198 lb (90 kg; 14 st 2 lb)
- Position: Right wing
- Shoots: Left
- Czech team Former teams: HC Verva Litvínov; HC Plzeň; Rimouski Océanic; Baie-Comeau Drakkar; Adirondack Phantoms; Philadelphia Flyers; Lehigh Valley Phantoms; Albany Devils; HC Dukla Jihlava
- NHL draft: 55th overall, 2010; Columbus Blue Jackets
- Playing career: 2013–present

Petr Straka (born June 15, 1992) is a Czech professional ice hockey player currently playing under contract for HC Verva Litvínov in the Czech Extraliga (ELH).

== Playing career ==
Straka was selected by the Columbus Blue Jackets in the 2nd round (55th overall) of the 2010 NHL entry draft. However, the Blue Jackets did not sign Straka to an entry-level contract and he was not selected in the 2012 NHL entry draft. Straka became a free agent and on April 11, 2013, was signed to a three-year entry-level contract by the Philadelphia Flyers. In the 2014–15 season, Straka was recalled from AHL affiliate, the Lehigh Valley Phantoms and made his NHL debut on January 27, 2015. He appeared in 3 games with the Flyers, recording two assists.

On November 12, 2016, Straka was traded by the Flyers to the New Jersey Devils in exchange for a conditional seventh-round pick. He was reassigned to AHL affiliate, the Albany Devils, for the duration of the 2016–17 season, contributing with 4 goals and 13 points in 38 games.

As an impending free agent and with limited NHL opportunity, Straka opted to return to hometown club, in signing a one-year deal with HC Plzeň of the Czech Extraliga on June 20, 2017.

== Career statistics ==
=== Regular season and playoffs ===
			Regular season					Playoffs
Season	Team	League	GP	G	A	Pts	PIM	GP	G	A	Pts	PIM
2009–10	Rimouski Océanic	QMJHL	62	28	36	64	54	12	5	9	14	10
2010–11	Rimouski Océanic	QMJHL	41	10	15	25	33	5	2	2	4	0
2011–12	Rimouski Océanic	QMJHL	54	18	19	37	41	21	10	12	22	6
2012–13	Baie-Comeau Drakkar	QMJHL	55	41	41	82	34	19	11	14	25	12
2013–14	Adirondack Phantoms	AHL	60	9	18	27	22	—	—	—	—	—
2014–15	Lehigh Valley Phantoms	AHL	68	14	10	24	26	—	—	—	—	—
2014–15	Philadelphia Flyers	NHL	3	0	2	2	0	—	—	—	—	—
2015–16	Lehigh Valley Phantoms	AHL	64	19	18	37	25	—	—	—	—	—
2016–17	Albany Devils	AHL	38	4	9	13	14	—	—	—	—	—
2017–18	HC Plzeň	ELH	43	8	4	12	36	—	—	—	—	—
2017–18	HC Dukla Jihlava	ELH	9	4	2	6	2	—	—	—	—	—
2018–19	HC Plzeň	ELH	48	10	19	29	34	14	1	4	5	26
2019–20	HC Plzeň	ELH	46	8	7	15	44	—	—	—	—	—
NHL totals			3	0	2	2	0	—	—	—	—	—

=== International ===
Year	Team	Event	Result	GP	G	A	Pts	PIM
2009	Czech Republic	WJC18	6th	6	0	0	0	2
2011	Czech Republic	WJC	7th	6	1	2	3	4
2012	Czech Republic	WJC	5th	6	0	1	1	27
Junior totals				18	1	3	4	33

== Notable awards and honours ==
Quebec Major Junior Hockey League

- RDS Cup (Rookie of the Year) — 2009–10
- Michel Bergeron Trophy (Offensive Rookie of the Year) — 2009–10
- QMJHL All-Rookie Team — 2009–10

Canadian Hockey League

- Canadian Major Junior All-Rookie Team (2010)
