= Raman Hrabarenka =

Belarus ice hockey player

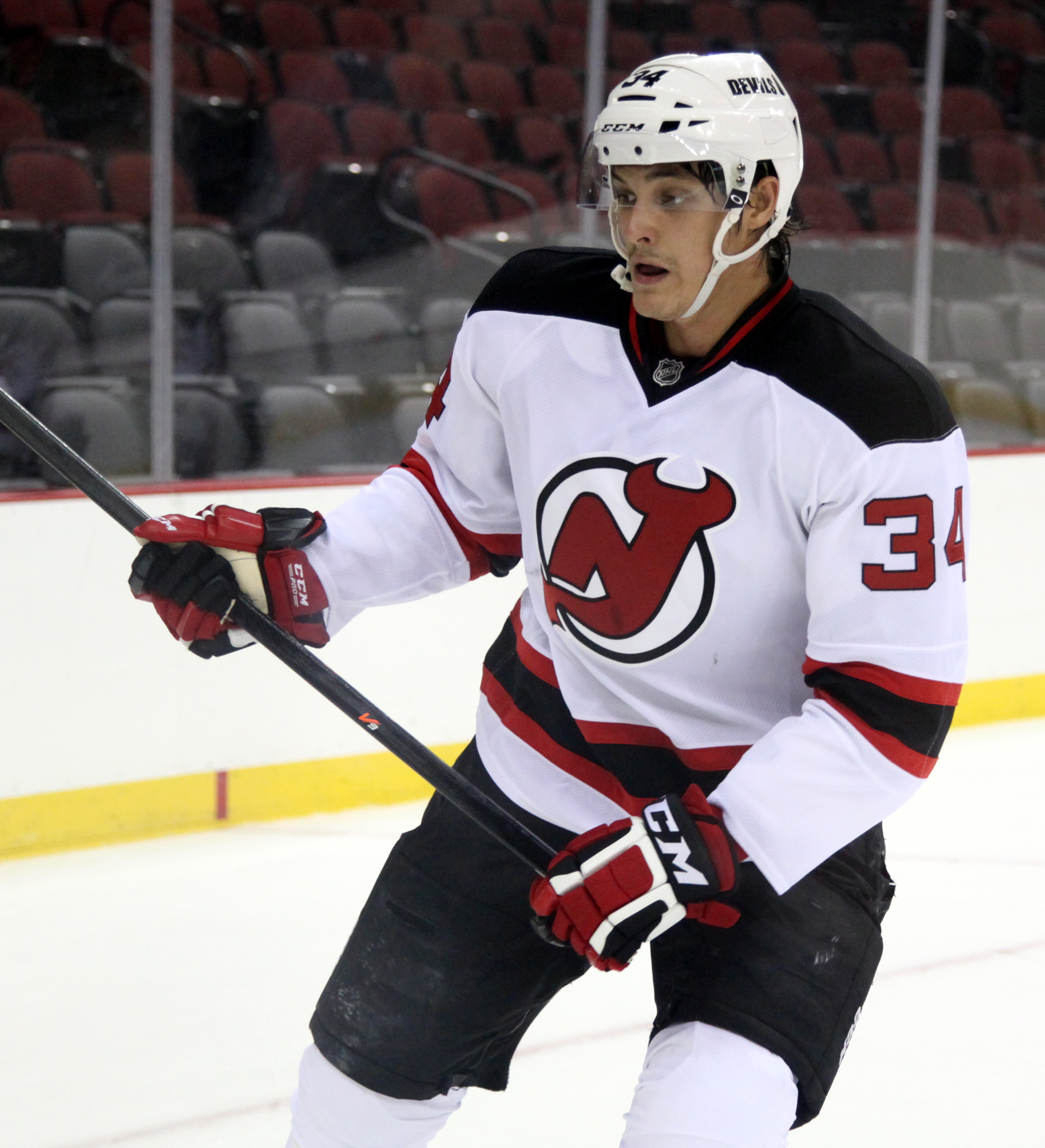
- Hrabarenka with the New Jersey Devils in 2015
- Born: 24 August 1992 (age 33) Mogilev, Belarus
- Height: 6 ft 4 in (193 cm)
- Weight: 230 lb (104 kg; 16 st 6 lb)
- Position: Defence
- Shoots: Right
- PHL team Former teams: Cracovia Krakow; New Jersey Devils; HC Dinamo Minsk; Neftekhimik Nizhnekamsk; Kunlun Red Star; HC Litvínov; HC Bílí Tygři Liberec
- National team: Belarus
- NHL draft: Undrafted
- Playing career: 2012–present

Raman Andreevich Hrabarenka (Belarusian: Раман Андрэевіч Грабарэнка; born 24 August 1992), also known as Roman Andreyevich Graborenko (Russian: Роман Андреевич Гpaбoрэнкo, is a Belarusian professional ice hockey defenceman who is currently playing for Cracovia Kraków in the Polska Hokej Liga, the top league in Poland. He most recently played for HC Neftekhimik Nizhnekamsk of the Kontinental Hockey League (KHL). He previously played within the New Jersey Devils organization of the National Hockey League (NHL), and appeared in one game for them in 2015. Hrabarenka played major junior hockey with the Cape Breton Screaming Eagles and Drummondville Voltigeurs of the Quebec Major Junior Hockey League (QMJHL), before signing as a professional with the Albany Devils of the American Hockey League (AHL) and the top minor-league affiliate for New Jersey, in 2012. He signed with New Jersey in 2013 and continued to play for Albany. Once his contract ended in 2016 he signed with HC Dinamo Minsk for one season before joining Nefekhimik and Kunlun. Internationally Hrabarenka has represented Belarus, and has played in several World Championships.

== Playing career ==
Born in Belarus, Hrabarenka first started to skate when he was 6, and moved to Russia with his parents at age 11. In order to further his hockey career he moved to the United States when he was 16, playing for the Philadelphia Revolution of the Eastern Hockey League.

Hrabarenka played major junior hockey with the Cape Breton Screaming Eagles and Drummondville Voltigeurs of the Quebec Major Junior Hockey League.

Undrafted, Hrabarenka made his professional debut with the Albany Devils of the American Hockey League in the 2012–13 season. He was later signed by Albany's parent affiliate, the New Jersey Devils, to a three-year entry-level contract on 12 July 2013.

Hrabarenka made his NHL debut during the 2014–15 season. He played against the Tampa Bay Lightning on April 9, 2015.

Not tended a qualifying offer by New Jersey, Hranbarenka became a free agent. Going unsigned throughout the summer, Hranbarenka agreed to a professional try-out with the Toronto Maple Leafs on August 22, 2016. The try-out was unsuccessful, and in December 2016 Hrabarenka returned to Belarus, signing a contract with HC Dinamo Minsk of the Kontinental Hockey League (KHL). He played 17 games for Dinamo during the 2016–17 season, recording 6 points. He then signed with HC Neftekhimik Nizhnekamsk for the 2017–18 season.

After two season stint in the Czech Extraliga with HC Litvínov and HC Bílí Tygři Liberec, Hrabarenka returned to former KHL club, Neftekhimik Nizhnekamsk as a free agent, agreeing to a one-year contract on 15 May 2020.

== International play ==
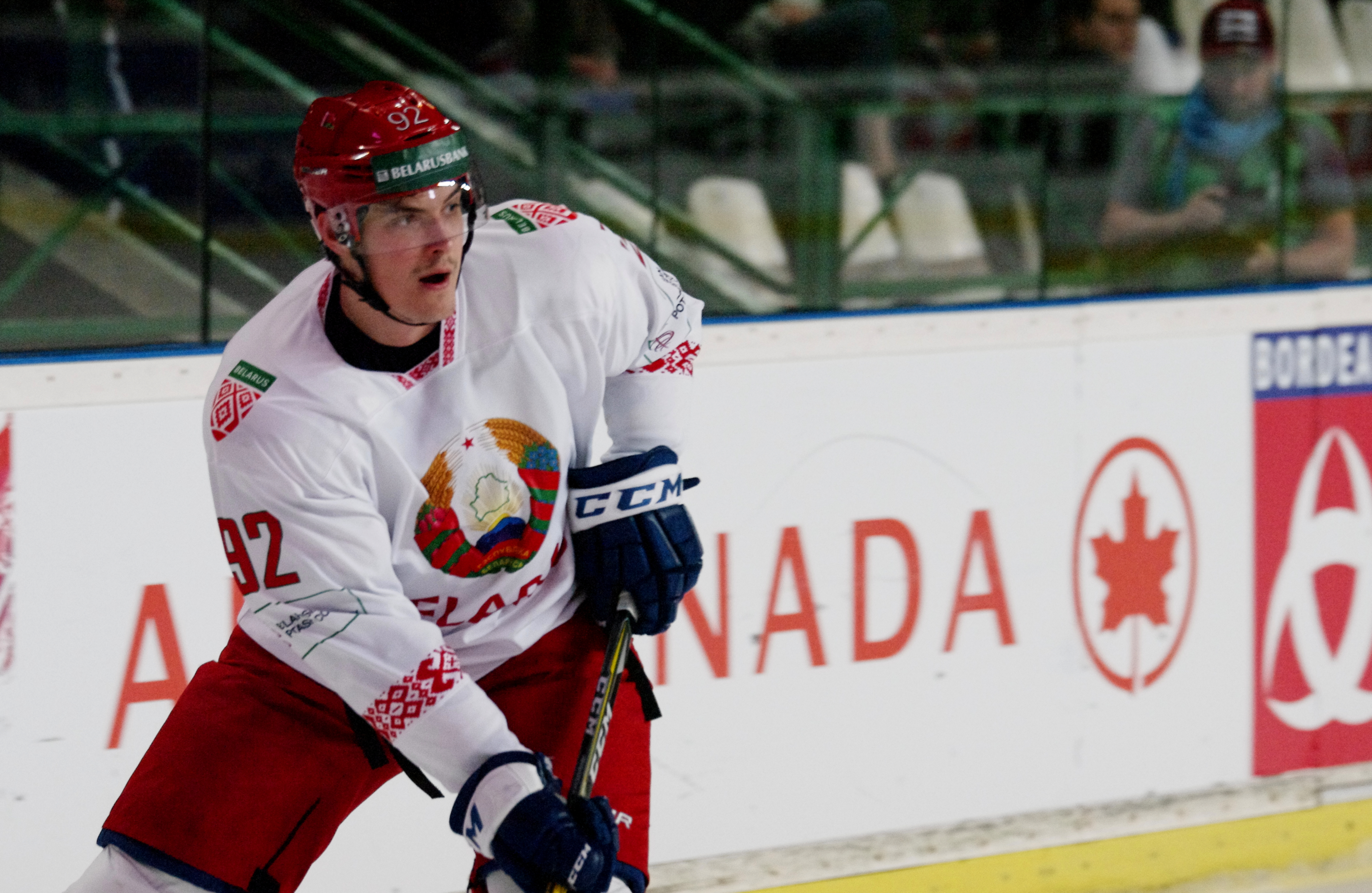
Hrabarenka with the Belarusian national team in 2017

Hrabarenka's first International Ice Hockey Federation (IIHF) tournament was the 2008 World U18 Championship, where he represented the Belarusian national under-18 team. Belarus finished ninth and was relegated to Division I for the next year. His next appearance was at the 2009 World U18 Championship Division I. At the 2009 tournament he helped Belarus win their group and earn a promotion to the top division for the following year. He also played at the 2012 World Junior Championship Division I.

Hrabarenka made his debut for the senior national team at the 2012. He would play for them again at the 2013, 2014, and 2017 World Championships.

== Career statistics ==
=== Regular season and playoffs ===
			Regular season					Playoffs
Season	Team	League	GP	G	A	Pts	PIM	GP	G	A	Pts	PIM
2009–10	Philadelphia Revolution	EJHL	32	4	5	9	59	—	—	—	—	—
2010–11	Cape Breton Screaming Eagles	QMJHL	50	2	7	9	68	4	0	0	0	8
2011–12	Cape Breton Screaming Eagles	QMJHL	30	1	5	6	26	—	—	—	—	—
2011–12	Drummondville Voltigeurs	QMJHL	27	3	11	14	29	4	2	1	3	6
2012–13	Albany Devils	AHL	34	1	4	5	18	—	—	—	—	—
2013–14	Elmira Jackals	ECHL	5	0	2	2	4	—	—	—	—	—
2013–14	Albany Devils	AHL	48	6	15	21	26	—	—	—	—	—
2014–15	Albany Devils	AHL	47	9	18	27	26	—	—	—	—	—
2014–15	New Jersey Devils	NHL	1	0	0	0	0	—	—	—	—	—
2015–16	Albany Devils	AHL	47	5	4	9	42	—	—	—	—	—
2016–17	HC Dinamo Minsk	KHL	16	2	6	8	21	1	0	0	0	2
2017–18	Neftekhimik Nizhnekamsk	KHL	17	1	1	2	16	—	—	—	—	—
2017–18	Kunlun Red Star	KHL	31	1	2	3	12	—	—	—	—	—
2018–19	HC Litvínov	ELH	22	1	4	5	16	—	—	—	—	—
2019–20	HC Bílí Tygři Liberec	ELH	49	0	10	10	85	—	—	—	—	—
2020–21	Neftekhimik Nizhnekamsk	KHL	9	1	1	2	24	—	—	—	—	—
NHL totals			1	0	0	0	0	—	—	—	—	—
KHL totals			73	5	10	15	73	1	0	0	0	2

=== International ===
Year	Team	Event	GP	G	A	Pts	PIM
2008	Belarus	U18	6	0	0	0	2
2009	Belarus	U18 (Div I)	5	0	0	0	4
2012	Belarus	WJC (Div I)	5	2	2	4	2
2012	Belarus	WC	7	0	1	1	0
2013	Belarus	WC	7	1	0	1	2
2014	Belarus	WC	8	0	2	2	2
2017	Belarus	WC	4	0	1	1	6
Junior totals			16	2	2	4	8
Senior totals			26	1	4	5	10

== See also ==
- List of players who played only one game in the NHL
