= Alex Belzile =

Canadian ice hockey player (born 1991)

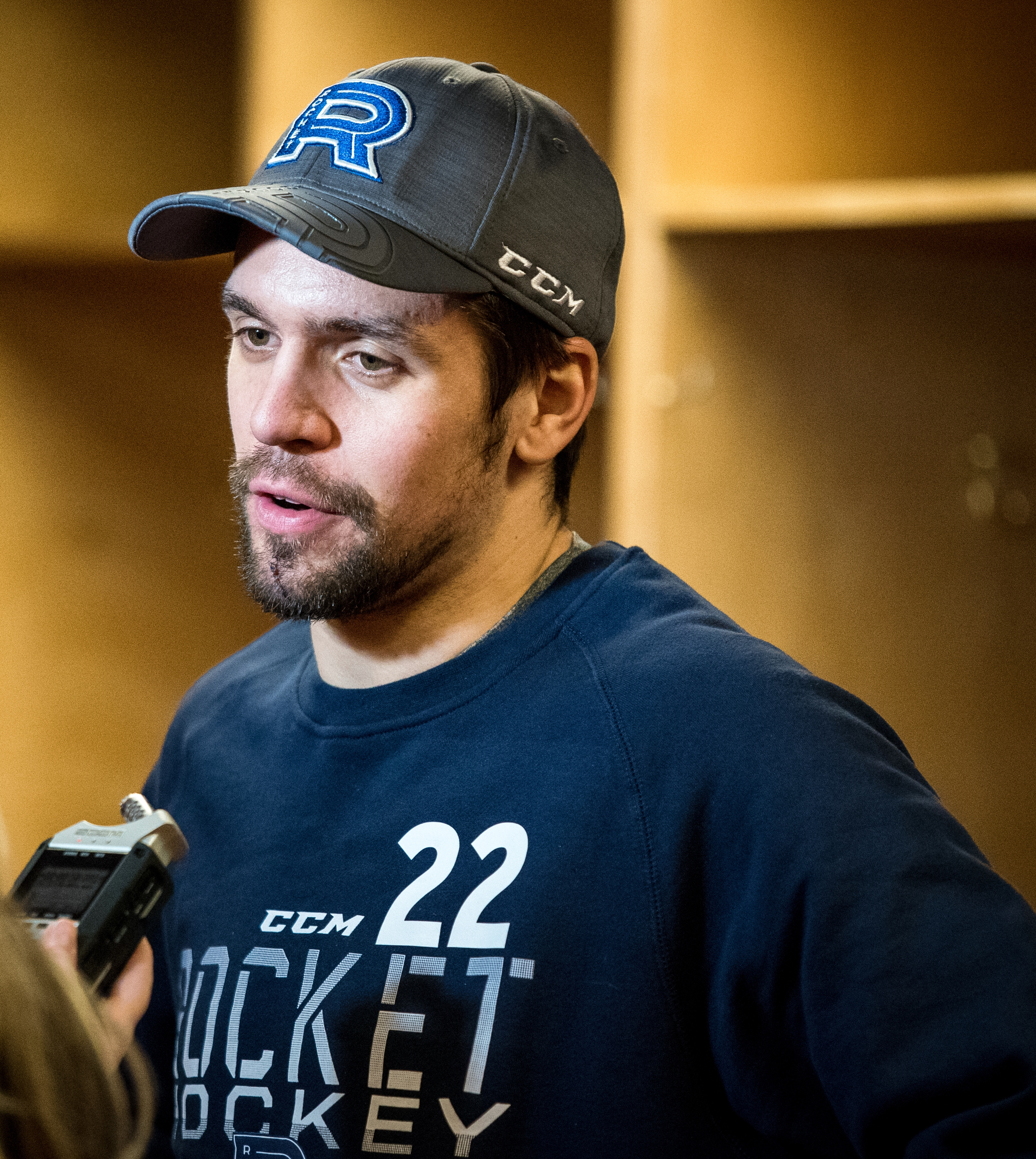
- Belzile with the Laval Rocket in 2019
- Born: August 31, 1991 (age 35) Saint-Éloi, Quebec, Canada
- Height: 6 ft 0 in (183 cm)
- Weight: 192 lb (87 kg; 13 st 10 lb)
- Position: Right wing
- Shoots: Right
- NHL team (P) Cur. team: Montreal Canadiens; Laval Rocket (AHL)
- NHL draft: Undrafted
- Playing career: 2012–present

Alex Belzile (born 31 August 1991) is a Canadian professional ice hockey winger and alternate captain for the Laval Rocket of the American Hockey League (AHL) while under contract to the Montreal Canadiens of the National Hockey League (NHL).

== Playing career ==
=== Junior ===
Belzile played as a junior in the QMAA within the Rivière-du-Loup Midget AA program before he was selected in the 11th round, 192nd overall, at the 2009 Quebec Major Junior Hockey League (QMJHL) draft by Rimouski Océanic. In his rookie season in 2009–10, Belzile appeared in 31 games recording 10 goals and 14 assists for 24 points. He showed offensive potential in posting 11 points in 12 playoff games.

In his first full season in the QMJHL in the 2010–11 season, Belzile led Rimouski in setting a personal best of 27 goals in 64 games. Establishing himself as a skilled, attacking forward, Belzile notched a new career high to lead the club in scoring by posting 70 assists and 92 points in the 2011–12 season. Despite placing second in the QMJHL in assists and fourth in points, he was passed over in each draft-eligible season.

=== Professional ===
Opting to turn professional, Belzile signed a one-year contract with the Gwinnett Gladiators of the ECHL for the 2012–13 season. He recorded ten goals and 20 assists in 40 games with the Gladiators. Belzile also signed a professional try-out with the American Hockey League's (AHL) Hamilton Bulldogs. In his first game with the club on 22 March, he scored the game-winning goal in a 1–0 win over the Syracuse Crunch. He finished his tenure with the team with eight points in 14 games.

Belzile remained with the Gladiators for the following 2013–14 season, but played a mere three games due to injury. On February 28, 2014, he was traded to the Alaska Aces. Belzile finished the season with 12 points in 19 games before scoring 10 points in 18 postseason games. The Aces defeated the Cincinnati Cyclones in six games to win the Kelly Cup.

On October 16, 2014, Belzile was traded to the Idaho Steelheads. He recorded a career-high 28 goals and 41 assists for 69 points during the 2014–15 season.

On September 1, 2015, Belzile was traded to the Fort Wayne Komets. On September 22, he signed a contract with the Komets' AHL affiliate, the San Antonio Rampage. He split the 2015–16 season between both clubs, finishing with 31 points in 29 games for the Komets and ten points in 25 games for the Rampage.

On July 15, 2016, the Rampage re-signed Belzile to a one-year contract extension. He split the 2016–17 season between the Rampage and their new ECHL affiliate, the Colorado Eagles. Belzile recorded a team and ECHL-best 26 points in 18 games to help the Eagles claim their first Kelly Cup.

Belzile returned to the Rampage for the 2017–18 season, signing a one-year contract extension on August 8, 2017. In his first full AHL season, he recorded 34 points in 61 games.

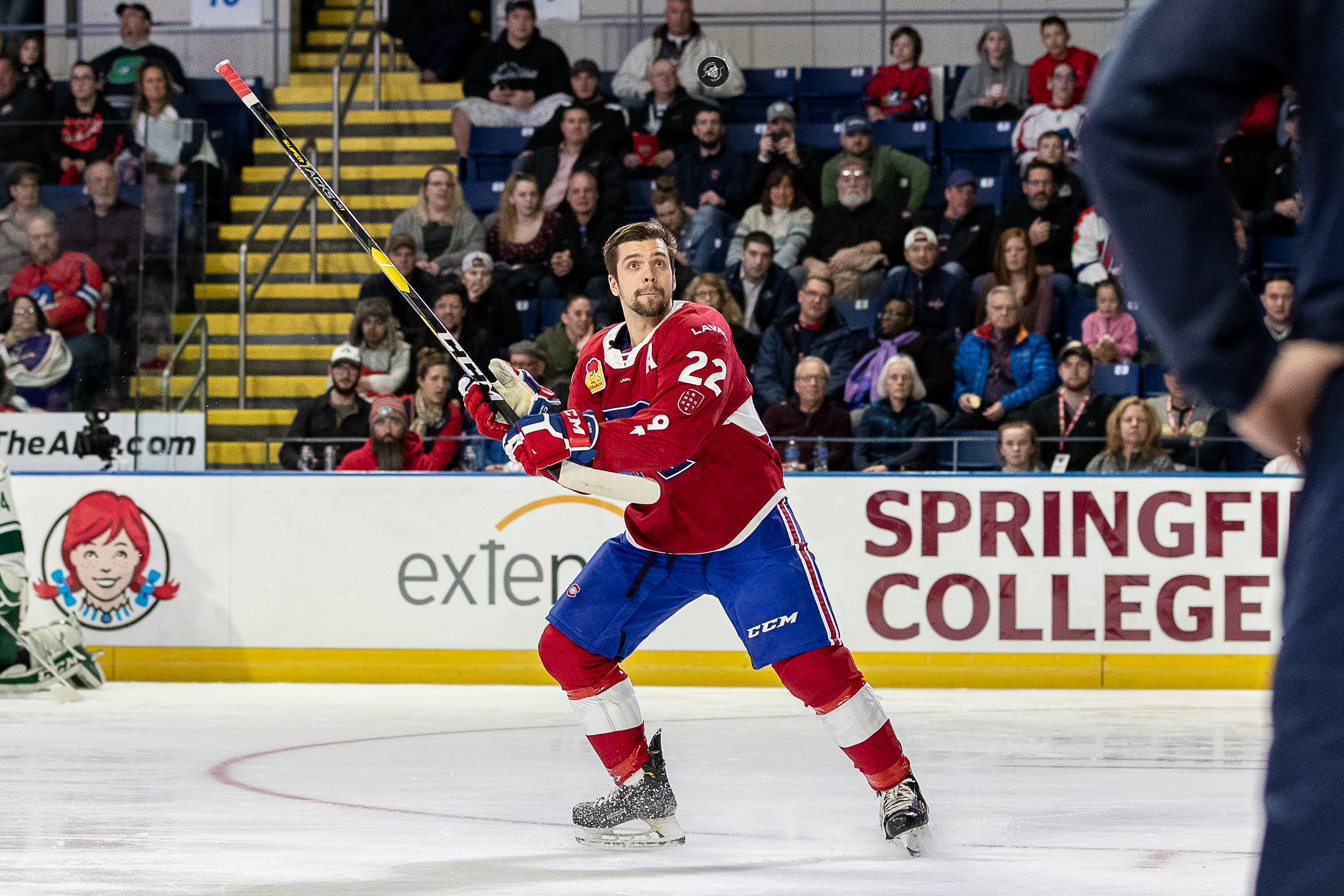
Belzile with a trick shootout attempt at the 2019 All-Star Classic.

On July 1, 2018, Belzile signed a one-year contract with the Laval Rocket. He represented the club at the 2019 All-Star Classic on January 3, 2019. He finished the season with 54 points in 74 games.

On May 25, 2019, Belzile signed his first National Hockey League (NHL) contract, agreeing to a one-year, two-way contract with the Rocket's affiliate, the Montreal Canadiens. On March 19, 2020, the Canadiens signed Belzile to a one-year, two-way contract extension. He totalled 14 points in 20 games for the Rocket during the 2019–20 season before the season was cancelled due to the COVID-19 pandemic.

Continuing with the Rocket with periodic call-ups to play for the Canadiens, Belzile scored his first NHL goal on February 12, 2023, in a 6–2 victory over the Edmonton Oilers. At age 31, he was the oldest player to score their first career goal for the Canadiens since 35-year-old Herb Gardiner in 1926. He played 31 games with the Canadiens during the 2022–23 season, ultimately registering six goals and eight assists, before being injured in an April 1, 2023 game against the Carolina Hurricanes. He was the Canadiens' nominee for the Bill Masterton Memorial Trophy for the year, awarded to "the NHL player who best exemplifies the qualities of perseverance, sportsmanship, and dedication to hockey."

After five seasons within the Canadiens organization, Belzile left as an unrestricted free agent to sign a two-year, $1.55 million contract with the New York Rangers on July 1, 2023. Two years later, he would return to Montreal, agreeing to a one-year deal with the team. After being placed on waivers for the purpose of AHL reassignment, Belzile was named as an alternate captain of Laval ahead of the 2025–26 season, having previously served as team captain in 2022–23.

== Career statistics ==
| | | | Regular season | | | | | Playoffs |
| Season | Team | League | GP | G | A | Pts | PIM | GP | G | A | Pts | PIM |
|---|---|---|---|---|---|---|---|---|---|---|---|---|
| 2009–10 | Collège Champlain Cougars | QJAAAHL | 33 | 14 | 26 | 40 | 62 | — | — | — | — | — |
| 2009–10 | Rimouski Océanic | QMJHL | 31 | 10 | 24 | 34 | 20 | 12 | 7 | 4 | 11 | 14 |
| 2010–11 | Rimouski Océanic | QMJHL | 64 | 27 | 40 | 67 | 78 | 5 | 2 | 5 | 7 | 6 |
| 2011–12 | Rimouski Océanic | QMJHL | 63 | 22 | 70 | 92 | 85 | 21 | 6 | 18 | 24 | 28 |
| 2012–13 | Gwinnett Gladiators | ECHL | 40 | 10 | 20 | 30 | 36 | 4 | 0 | 2 | 2 | 2 |
| 2012–13 | Hamilton Bulldogs | AHL | 14 | 3 | 5 | 8 | 11 | — | — | — | — | — |
| 2013–14 | Gwinnett Gladiators | ECHL | 3 | 0 | 0 | 0 | 8 | — | — | — | — | — |
| 2013–14 | Alaska Aces | ECHL | 16 | 4 | 8 | 12 | 0 | 18 | 3 | 7 | 10 | 18 |
| 2014–15 | Idaho Steelheads | ECHL | 63 | 28 | 41 | 69 | 113 | 6 | 1 | 1 | 2 | 4 |
| 2015–16 | Fort Wayne Komets | ECHL | 29 | 10 | 21 | 31 | 34 | 16 | 6 | 10 | 16 | 20 |
| 2015–16 | San Antonio Rampage | AHL | 25 | 6 | 4 | 10 | 10 | — | — | — | — | — |
| 2016–17 | Colorado Eagles | ECHL | 17 | 10 | 17 | 27 | 18 | 18 | 14 | 12 | 26 | 38 |
| 2016–17 | San Antonio Rampage | AHL | 45 | 5 | 7 | 12 | 39 | — | — | — | — | — |
| 2017–18 | San Antonio Rampage | AHL | 61 | 14 | 20 | 34 | 63 | — | — | — | — | — |
| 2018–19 | Laval Rocket | AHL | 74 | 19 | 35 | 54 | 80 | — | — | — | — | — |
| 2019–20 | Laval Rocket | AHL | 20 | 7 | 7 | 14 | 30 | — | — | — | — | — |
| 2019–20 | Montreal Canadiens | NHL | — | — | — | — | — | 6 | 0 | 1 | 1 | 0 |
| 2020–21 | Laval Rocket | AHL | 17 | 4 | 10 | 14 | 39 | — | — | — | — | — |
| 2020–21 | Montreal Canadiens | NHL | 2 | 0 | 1 | 1 | 0 | — | — | — | — |
| 2021–22 | Laval Rocket | AHL | 32 | 10 | 12 | 22 | 23 | 15 | 5 | 4 | 9 | 44 |
| 2021–22 | Montreal Canadiens | NHL | 11 | 0 | 0 | 0 | 4 | — | — | — | — | — |
| 2022–23 | Laval Rocket | AHL | 31 | 14 | 12 | 26 | 29 | — | — | — | — | — |
| 2022–23 | Montreal Canadiens | NHL | 31 | 6 | 8 | 14 | 13 | — | — | — | — | — |
| 2023–24 | Hartford Wolf Pack | AHL | 61 | 19 | 31 | 50 | 70 | 10 | 1 | 2 | 3 | 16 |
| 2024–25 | Hartford Wolf Pack | AHL | 66 | 19 | 37 | 56 | 119 | — | — | — | — | — |
| 2025–26 | Laval Rocket | AHL | 66 | 29 | 33 | 62 | 76 | 5 | 2 | 0 | 2 | 2 |
| NHL totals | | | 44 | 6 | 9 | 15 | 17 | 6 | 0 | 1 | 1 | 0 |

== Awards and honours ==
| Award | Year | Ref |
|---|---|---|
ECHL
| Kelly Cup champion | 2014, 2017 | |
AHL
| All-Star Game | 2019, 2025 | |
