= Mathieu Corbeil-Thériault =

Canadian ice hockey player (born 1991)

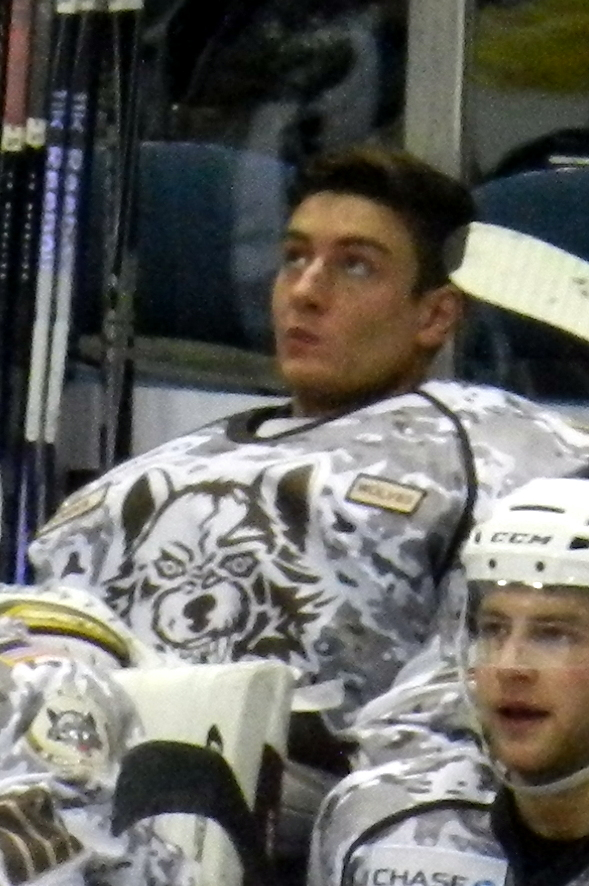
- Corbeil-Thériault with the Chicago Wolves in 2013
- Born: September 27, 1991 (age 34) Montreal, Quebec, Canada
- Height: 6 ft 6 in (198 cm)
- Weight: 225 lb (102 kg; 16 st 1 lb)
- Position: Goaltender
- Caught: Left
- Played for: CHL; Missouri Mavericks; St. Charles Chill; Slovak Extraliga; HK Poprad; HC '05 Banská Bystrica; HK Martin
- NHL draft: 102nd overall, 2010; Columbus Blue Jackets
- Playing career: 2011–2019

Mathieu Corbeil-Thériault (born September 27, 1991), also known as Mathieu Corbeil, is a Canadian former professional ice hockey goaltender. He was selected by the Columbus Blue Jackets of the National Hockey League in the 4th round (102nd overall) of the 2010 NHL entry draft.

== Major Junior Career ==
Corbeil-Thériault began his Major Junior career with the Halifax Mooseheads of the QMJHL for the 2008–09 season. On January 6, 2011, he was traded by the Mooseheads to the Saint John Sea Dogs, also of the QMJHL. He concluded his Major Junior Career after the 2011–12 season.

== Professional career ==
On October 18, 2011, the Columbus Blue Jackets, who held his National Hockey League rights, added Corbeil-Thériault to their roster on emergency recall from the Quebec Major Junior Hockey League to dress behind starting goaltender Steve Mason for a home game loss against the visiting Dallas Stars, though he did not play in the game. On October 19, 2011, the Blue Jackets reassigned him to the Sea Dogs.

After the Blue Jackets decided not to re-sign him, Corbeil-Thériault signed with the Chicago Wolves of the American Hockey League on August 8, 2012. On October 8, 2012, he was assigned by the Wolves to the Missouri Mavericks of the Central Hockey League. On January 14, 2013, he was recalled by the Wolves from the Mavericks. After dressing for, but not playing in, the Wolves's game against the Texas Stars on January 16, 2013, he was reassigned to the Missouri Mavericks on January 17, 2013. After starting for the Mavericks in his first game after being reassigned, he was once again recalled by the Chicago Wolves on January 19, 2013. On January 26, 2013, he was reassigned to the Missouri Mavericks of the Central Hockey League once again. On January 29, 2013, he was recalled by the Wolves, before once again being reassigned to the Mavericks on February 6, 2013. On February 22, 2013, he was once again recalled by the Wolves. On March 7, 2013, the Wolves reassigned him to the Mavericks.

On July 18, 2013, Corbeil-Thériault signed with the Utica Comets of the American Hockey League. On October 3 of that year, the Comets assigned him to the St. Charles Chill of the Central Hockey League. On November 22, he was assigned to the Wheeling Nailers of the ECHL and on November 30, he recorded a shutout in his ECHL debut.

He also played for HC ’05 Banská Bystrica, HK Poprad and HK Martin in Slovak Extraliga, before returning to Quebec in 2019.

== Career statistics ==
=== Regular season ===
Season	Team	League	GP	Min	GA	SO	GAA	W	L	T	OTL	SV	SV%
2007–08	Montréal Prédateurs	QMAAA	27	1296	109	1	5.04	3	21	0	–	–	0.869
2008–09	Halifax Mooseheads	QMJHL	24	1094	81	0	4.44	3	14	–	–	–	0.873
2009–10	Halifax Mooseheads	QMJHL	50	2692	172	0	3.83	8	39	–	–	–	0.883
2010–11	Halifax Mooseheads	QMJHL	25	1294	81	0	3.76	7	15	–	1	–	0.867
2010–11	Saint John Sea Dogs	QMJHL	15	914	33	0	2.17	13	1	–	1	–	0.908
2011–12	Saint John Sea Dogs	QMJHL	48	2779	110	6	2.38	37	10	–	1	–	0.911
2012–13	Missouri Mavericks	CHL	21	1229	55	2	2.69	10	9	–	1	590	0.915
			210	11298	641	9	3.40	81	109	–	–	–	0.889

=== Postseason ===
Season	Team	League	GP	Min	GA	SO	GAA	W	L	T	OTL	SV	SV%
2006–07	Montréal Prédateurs	QMAAA	1	–	–	–	6.00	–	–	–	–	–	0.854
2007–08	Montréal Prédateurs	QMAAA	2	95	9	0	5.70	0	1	–	–	–	0.901
2010–11	Saint John Sea Dogs	QMJHL	6	195	19	1	1.54	4	0	0	–	–	0.936
2011–12	Saint John Sea Dogs	QMJHL	17	1075	39	1	2.18	16	1	0	–	–	0.917
2012–13	Missouri Mavericks	CHL	5	267	10	0	2.24	3	1	0	–	122	0.924
			26	–	–	–	3.53	–	–	–	–	–	0.906

=== Memorial Cup ===
Season	Team	League	GP	Min	GA	SO	GAA	W	L	T	OTL	SV	SV%
2011	Saint John Sea Dogs	MEM	1	–	–	–	4.81	–	–	–	–	–	0.889
2012	Saint John Sea Dogs	MEM	4	–	–	–	3.51	–	–	–	–	–	0.881
			5	–	–	–	4.16	–	–	–	–	–	0.885

== Awards and honours ==
Award	Year
Slovak Extraliga
Playoffs MVP	2017
