= Behrens v. Pelletier =

- Supreme Court of the United States

Argued November 7, 1995 Decided February 21, 1996
- Full case name: Behrens v. Pelletier
- Citations: 516 U.S. 299 (more) 116 S. Ct. 834; 133 L. Ed. 2d 773

Case history
- Prior: Pelletier v. Federal Home Loan Bank, 968 F.2d 865 (9th Cir. 1992)
- Subsequent: Pelletier v. Behrens, 130 F.3d 429 (9th Cir. 1997)

Holding
- A defendant's immediate appeal of an unfavorable qualified-immunity ruling on a motion to dismiss does not deprive the court of appeals of jurisdiction over a second appeal, also based on qualified immunity, immediately following denial of summary judgment.

Court membership
- Chief Justice William Rehnquist Associate Justices John P. Stevens · Sandra Day O'Connor; Antonin Scalia · Anthony Kennedy; David Souter · Clarence Thomas; Ruth Bader Ginsburg · Stephen Breyer

Case opinions
- Majority: Scalia, joined by Rehnquist, O'Connor, Kennedy, Souter, Thomas, Ginsburg
- Dissent: Breyer, joined by Stevens

Behrens v. Pelletier, 516 U.S. 299 (1996), was a United States Supreme Court case in which the Court held a defendant's immediate appeal of an unfavorable qualified immunity ruling on a motion to dismiss does not deprive the court of appeals of jurisdiction over a second appeal, also based on qualified immunity, immediately following denial of summary judgment.

== Background ==
The Federal Home Loan Bank Board fired Robert Pelletier (Plaintiff) as the provisional managing officer of Pioneer Savings and Loans Associations after the agent responsible for monitoring Pioneer's operations, John Behrens (Defendant), recommended such action. The basis of Behrens recommendation was an investigation involving the collapse of another financial institution, and possible misconduct by Pelletier. Pelletier filled suite arguing wrongfully termination, and John Behrens claimed he was acting on behalf of the government and therefore was he was entitled to qualified immunity.

== Issue ==
At issue is if a defendant's initial appeal for qualified immunity is unfavorable, does this ruling deprive the court of appeals jurisdiction of over a subsequent appeal based on the same claim, i.e., qualified immunity.

== See also ==
- List of United States Supreme Court cases, volume 516
- List of United States Supreme Court cases
- Lists of United States Supreme Court cases by volume
- List of United States Supreme Court cases by the Rehnquist Court
