= Frédérick Gaudreau =

Canadian ice hockey player (born 1993)

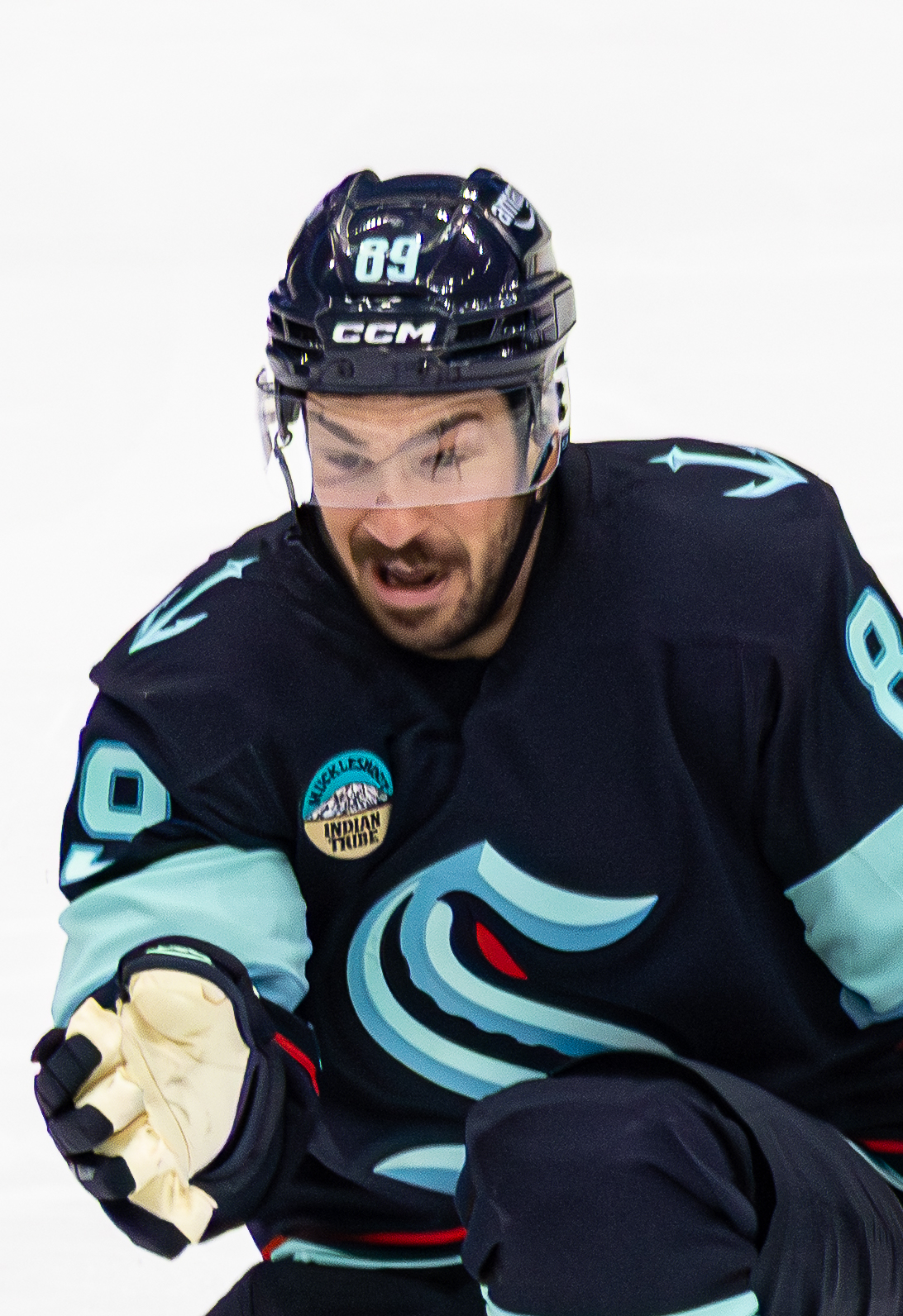
- Gaudreau with the Seattle Kraken in 2026
- Born: May 1, 1993 (age 33) Bromont, Quebec, Canada
- Height: 6 ft 0 in (183 cm)
- Weight: 184 lb (83 kg; 13 st 2 lb)
- Position: Centre
- Shoots: Right
- NHL team Former teams: Seattle Kraken; Nashville Predators; Pittsburgh Penguins; Minnesota Wild
- NHL draft: Undrafted
- Playing career: 2014–present

Frédérick Gaudreau (born May 1, 1993) is a Canadian professional ice hockey player who is a centre for the Seattle Kraken of the National Hockey League (NHL).

== Early life ==
Gaudreau was born on May 1, 1993, in Bromont, Quebec, Canada as the youngest child of parents Jean-Pierre Gaudreau and France Desrosiers. He attended Cégep de Shawinigan while playing in the Quebec Major Junior Hockey League and drove two hours from Drummondville to Shawinigan in order to graduate.

== Playing career ==
=== Junior ===
As a youth, Gaudreau played in the 2006 Quebec International Pee-Wee Hockey Tournament with a minor ice hockey team from Missisquoi, Quebec. While playing midget hockey in the QMAAA with the Magog Cantonniers, Gaudreau suffered a severe wrist injury, turning him off the radar for junior scouts. However, due to a rule change allowing 17 year olds to continue playing midget ice hockey, Gaudreau was chosen by the Shawinigan Cataractes in the Quebec Major Junior Hockey League (QMJHL) as a walk-on in 2011.

In his rookie season with the Cataractes, he played in 64 games as the team won the 2012 Memorial Cup. Two years later, he was named the team's 57th captain in franchise history. His time as captain was shortlived, however, as he was traded to the Drummondville Voltigeurs in exchange for a first round pick in 2015, a second round pick in 2014, and Antoine Kilanowski. His only season with the Voltigeurs proved to be successful as he earned the Frank J. Selke Memorial Trophy as the QMJHL's most sportsmanlike player and was courted by at least four professional teams.

=== Professional ===
Undrafted, Gaudreau signed his first professional contract with the Milwaukee Admirals of the AHL, on June 12, 2014. In the 2014–15 season, he added to the depth of the Milwaukee attack, contributing with 11 points in 43 games. He was also loaned for 14 games to ECHL partner, the Cincinnati Cyclones, producing 5 goals. On May 21, 2015, Gaudreau was extended by the Admirals for a further season.

In the midst of a break-out 2015–16 season, having established himself in a scoring role with the Admirals, Gaudreau was signed to a two-year, entry-level contract with the NHL affiliate, the Nashville Predators on January 6, 2016. He completed the season in the AHL, placing third on the Admirals in scoring with new professional highs with 15 goals and 42 points in 75 games.

After attending the Predators' training camp, he was reassigned to Milwaukee to begin the 2016–17 season. On October 22, 2016, Gaudreau received his first NHL recall to the Predators, after the team suffered a bout of food poisoning. He immediately made his NHL debut with the Predators in a 5–1 victory over the Pittsburgh Penguins. He was returned to the Admirals following the game.

In Game 5 of the 2017 Western Conference Finals against the Anaheim Ducks, Gaudreau made his playoff debut after injuries to Ryan Johansen and Mike Fisher necessitated his presence in the line-up. Gaudreau scored the winning goal in the Predators' 5–1 victory over the Pittsburgh Penguins in Game 3 of the 2017 Stanley Cup Finals. In Game 4, Gaudreau again scored the game winner as the Predators defeated the Penguins 4–1 to even the series at two games apiece. In doing so, Gaudreau became the first player since Johnny Harms of the 1943–44 Chicago Black Hawks to score his first three career NHL goals in the Stanley Cup Finals.

After six seasons within the Predators organization, Gaudreau left as a free agent to sign a one-year, two-way contract with the Pittsburgh Penguins on October 10, 2020. Beginning the pandemic delayed 2020–21 season with AHL affiliate, the Wilkes-Barre/Scranton Penguins, Gaudreau was recalled and after he was inserted into the lineup he established career-highs with 8 assists and 10 points in just 19 games. Remaining a fixture in the playoffs, Gaudreau led the club in plus-minus (+3) and recorded 1 goal and 3 points through 6 games.

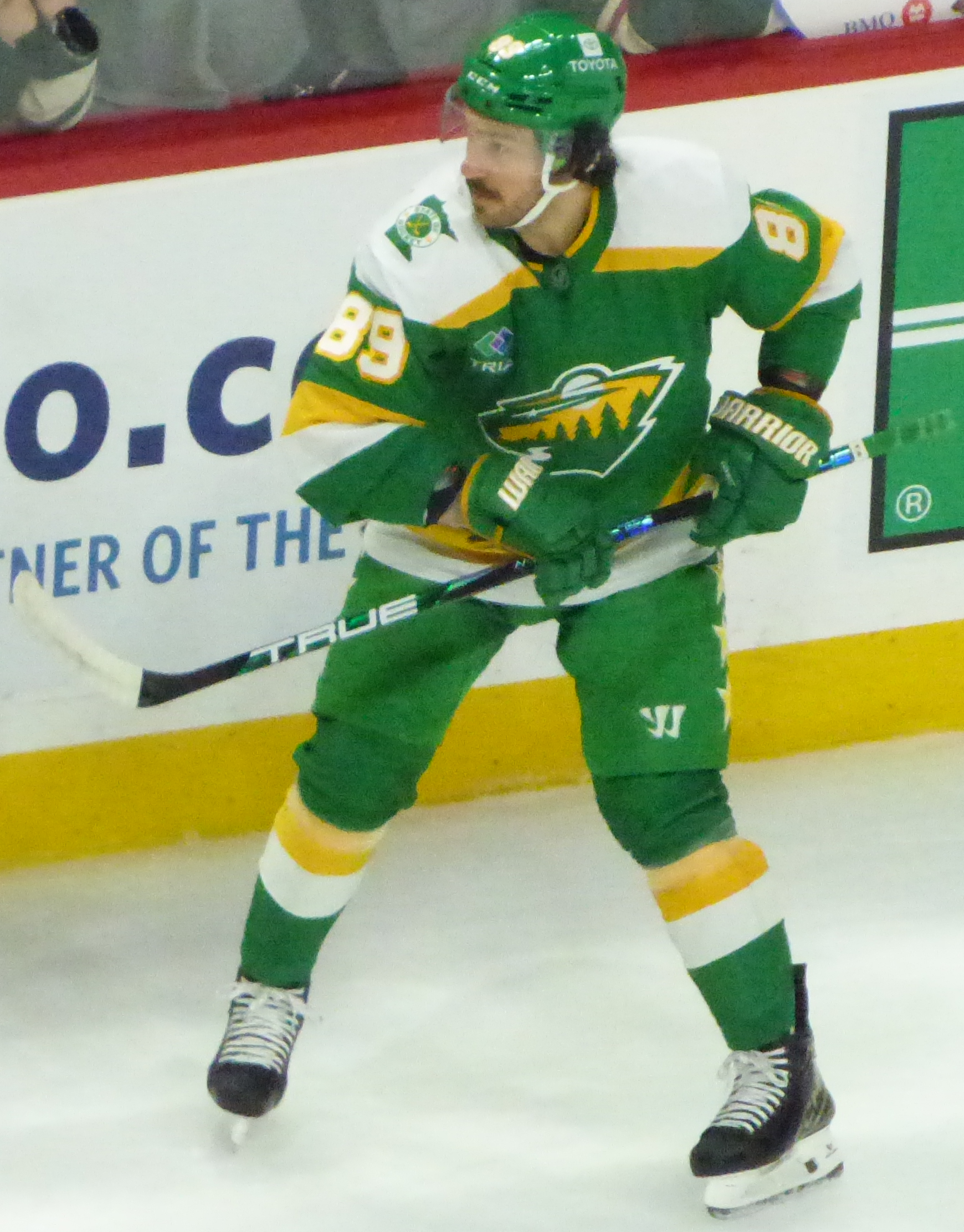
Gaudreau with the Wild in 2025

A free agent at the conclusion of his contract with the Penguins, Gaudreau was rewarded for a successful season, signing a two-year, $2.4 million contract with the Minnesota Wild on July 28, 2021. Gaudreau was featured in a "Becoming Wild" video about off-season training on the Wild on Nov 9, 2021.

In 2023, Gaudreau signed a five-year, $10.5 million contract ($2.1 million average annual value, 15-team modified no-trade clause). He scored a career-high 19 goals during the 22-23 season. He played most of the 23-24 season with injuries to his rib cage after an open-ice hit on October 14 and ended the season with a team-worst plus minus (-23), recording 5 goals and 10 assists in 67 games as the Wild missed the playoffs for only the second time since 2012.

Following the 2024–25 season, his fourth with the Wild, Gaudreau was traded to the Seattle Kraken in exchange for a 2025 fourth-round pick on June 26, 2025.

== Career statistics ==
			Regular season					Playoffs
Season	Team	League	GP	G	A	Pts	PIM	GP	G	A	Pts	PIM
2009–10	Magog Cantonniers	QMAAA	41	14	11	25	6	4	0	3	3	0
2010–11	Magog Cantonniers	QMAAA	42	14	25	39	2	13	7	5	12	2
2011–12	Shawinigan Cataractes	QMJHL	64	5	15	20	2	8	1	0	1	0
2012–13	Shawinigan Cataractes	QMJHL	68	13	30	43	22	—	—	—	—	—
2013–14	Shawinigan Cataractes	QMJHL	27	13	18	31	0	—	—	—	—	—
2013–14	Drummondville Voltigeurs	QMJHL	36	19	21	40	2	11	10	4	14	0
2014–15	Milwaukee Admirals	AHL	43	4	7	11	12	—	—	—	—	—
2014–15	Cincinnati Cyclones	ECHL	14	5	2	7	4	—	—	—	—	—
2015–16	Milwaukee Admirals	AHL	75	15	27	42	31	3	0	1	1	0
2016–17	Milwaukee Admirals	AHL	66	25	23	48	14	3	3	1	4	0
2016–17	Nashville Predators	NHL	9	0	1	1	0	8	3	0	3	0
2017–18	Milwaukee Admirals	AHL	54	22	21	43	2	—	—	—	—	—
2017–18	Nashville Predators	NHL	20	0	3	3	2	—	—	—	—	—
2018–19	Nashville Predators	NHL	55	3	1	4	2	—	—	—	—	—
2019–20	Milwaukee Admirals	AHL	42	11	17	28	6	—	—	—	—	—
2020–21	Wilkes-Barre/Scranton Penguins	AHL	6	1	3	4	2	—	—	—	—	—
2020–21	Pittsburgh Penguins	NHL	19	2	8	10	2	6	1	2	3	2
2021–22	Minnesota Wild	NHL	76	14	30	44	8	6	1	0	1	0
2022–23	Minnesota Wild	NHL	82	19	19	38	10	6	3	0	3	4
2023–24	Minnesota Wild	NHL	67	5	10	15	12	—	—	—	—	—
2024–25	Minnesota Wild	NHL	82	18	19	37	8	6	0	0	0	0
2025–26	Seattle Kraken	NHL	68	7	17	24	11	—	—	—	—	—
NHL totals			478	68	108	176	55	32	8	2	10	6

== Awards and honours ==
Award	Year
QMJHL
Memorial Cup	2012
Frank J. Selke Memorial Trophy	2014
AHL
AHL All-Star Game	2016
