= Samuel Morin =

Canadian ice hockey player (born 1995)

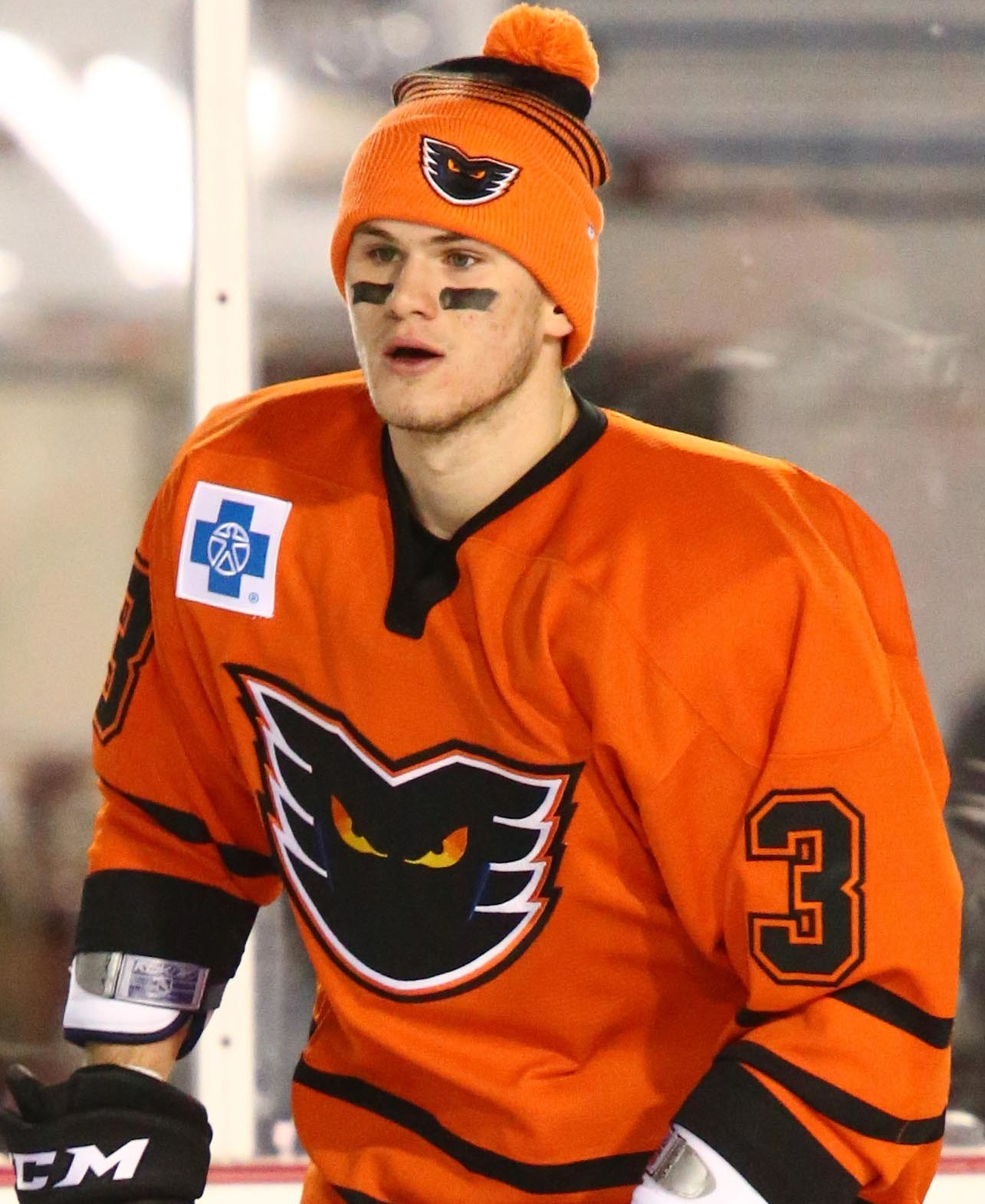
- Morin with the Lehigh Valley Phantoms in 2018
- Born: July 12, 1995 (age 31) Lac-Beauport, Quebec, Canada
- Height: 6 ft 6 in (198 cm)
- Weight: 202 lb (92 kg; 14 st 6 lb)
- Position: Defence
- Shot: Left
- Played for: Philadelphia Flyers
- NHL draft: 11th overall, 2013; Philadelphia Flyers
- Playing career: 2015–2021

Samuel Morin (born July 12, 1995) is a Canadian former professional ice hockey defenceman who played for the Philadelphia Flyers of the National Hockey League (NHL). He was selected by the Flyers in the first round, 11th overall, of the 2013 NHL entry draft. Prior to his professional career, Morin spent four seasons with Rimouski Océanic in the Quebec Major Junior Hockey League (QMJHL), where he helped lead the team to a President's Trophy win in 2015.

Morin made his professional debut with the Flyers' American Hockey League (AHL) affiliate, the Lehigh Valley Phantoms, in the following season. Over the course of his six-season professional career, the final four were plagued by knee injuries, limiting him to 28 NHL games and 55 total professional games in that span. In 2022, after missing the entirety of the 2021–22 hockey season due to injury, Morin retired at the age of 26.

== Early life ==
Morin was born on July 12, 1995, in Lac-Beauport, Quebec. His parents, Pascal and Sylvie, were farmers from the Francophone area of Saint-Isidore. Morin began playing minor ice hockey at the age of five, and his parents started a catering business while their son began playing in tournaments. In 2007 and 2008, Morin played in the Quebec International Pee-Wee Hockey Tournament with the Rive-Sud Est minor hockey team. In the 2010–11 season, Morin played for the Lévis Commandeurs of the Quebec Junior AAA Hockey League. In 36 midget "AAA" hockey games there, he recorded 12 assists and 40 penalty minutes.

== Playing career ==
=== Junior ===
In 2011, the Rimouski Océanic of the Quebec Major Junior Hockey League (QMJHL) selected Morin in the first round, seventh overall, of the QMJHL draft. He played left wing for the 2011–12 season, scoring eight points in 62 games with the Océanic, but quickly made the switch to defenceman. He was rewarded for his outstanding first year play by being selected to the 2011–12 QMJHL All-Rookie Team.

On September 17, 2013, Morin signed a three-year, entry-level contract with the Flyers, but was returned to the Océanic to play the 2013–14 season in the QMJHL.

Morin was a member of Canada's gold medal-winning squad at the 2015 World Juniors held in Toronto. That year, he also won the President's Cup with the Océanic as QMJHL champions, but could not advance in the ensuing 2015 Memorial Cup tournament among Canadian Hockey League (CHL) champions.

=== Professional ===
In the closing stages of the 2016–17 NHL season, Morin was recalled by the Flyers from the American Hockey League (AHL)'s Lehigh Valley Phantoms and made his NHL debut against the New Jersey Devils on April 4, 2017.

During the 2018 Calder Cup playoffs in the AHL, Morin suffered a season-ending knee injury. When Morin returned to play in 2019, he re-injured the same knee, tearing his ACL for the second time in 19 months. Due to his back-to-back injuries, he played very few games between 2018 and 2020.

On December 31, 2020, the Flyers announced Morin would be trying out for a left wing position for the 2020–21 season, instead of defense. Morin made his debut at forward on January 30, 2021, against the New York Islanders. He had previously stated he was trying to model his game after Islanders' enforcer Matt Martin.

Morin returned to the Phantoms to play defense in February and March 2021. He was recalled to the Flyers for the March 25 game against the New York Rangers, in which he fought Brendan Lemieux and received a $3,017.24 fine for unsportsmanlike conduct. In the following game, on March 27, Morin scored his first and only NHL goal on Rangers' goaltender Igor Shesterkin. His goal was the game-winner to break a four-game losing streak.

On May 3, 2022, Flyers general manager Chuck Fletcher announced that Morin’s playing career was over due to damage to his knee which could not be repaired to a point which allowed him to play again. Fletcher also said Morin would be offered a job within the organization. Following his retirement, Morin remained with the Flyers in a Player Development role.

== Career statistics ==
=== Regular season and playoffs ===
			Regular season					Playoffs
Season	Team	League	GP	G	A	Pts	PIM	GP	G	A	Pts	PIM
2011–12	Rimouski Océanic	QMJHL	62	0	8	8	57	10	0	1	1	8
2012–13	Rimouski Océanic	QMJHL	46	4	12	16	117	6	1	6	7	16
2013–14	Rimouski Océanic	QMJHL	54	7	24	31	121	11	4	4	8	30
2014–15	Rimouski Océanic	QMJHL	38	5	27	32	68	19	1	10	11	28
2015–16	Lehigh Valley Phantoms	AHL	76	4	15	19	118	—	—	—	—	—
2016–17	Lehigh Valley Phantoms	AHL	74	3	13	16	129	5	0	2	2	2
2016–17	Philadelphia Flyers	NHL	1	0	0	0	0	—	—	—	—	—
2017–18	Lehigh Valley Phantoms	AHL	15	1	6	7	26	3	0	0	0	2
2017–18	Philadelphia Flyers	NHL	2	0	0	0	4	—	—	—	—	—
2018–19	Lehigh Valley Phantoms	AHL	2	0	0	0	5	—	—	—	—	—
2018–19	Philadelphia Flyers	NHL	5	0	0	0	4	—	—	—	—	—
2019–20	Philadelphia Flyers	NHL	1	0	0	0	0	—	—	—	—	—
2019–20	Lehigh Valley Phantoms	AHL	3	0	0	0	2	—	—	—	—	—
2020–21	Philadelphia Flyers	NHL	20	1	0	1	37	—	—	—	—	—
2020–21	Lehigh Valley Phantoms	AHL	7	0	2	2	9	—	—	—	—	—
NHL totals			29	1	0	1	45	—	—	—	—	—

Medal record

Representing Canada

Ice hockey

IIHF World U18 Championship
Gold medal – first place	2013 Sochi	

IIHF World U20 Championship
Gold medal – first place	2015 Canada	

=== International ===
Year	Team	Event	Result	GP	G	A	Pts	PIM
2012	Canada Quebec	U17	6th	5	0	1	1	6
2013	Canada	WJC18	1st place, gold medalist(s)	7	0	2	2	6
2015	Canada	WJC	1st place, gold medalist(s)	7	0	0	0	6
Junior totals				19	0	3	3	18

== Awards and honours ==
Award	Year
QMJHL All-Rookie Team	2011–12
IIHF World U18 Championship Gold Medal	2013
IIHF World U20 Championships Gold Medal	2015
President's Cup champion	2015

Awards and achievements
Preceded by Scott Laughton	Philadelphia Flyers' first-round draft pick 2013	Succeeded by Travis Sanheim
