= Philippe Cadorette =

Canadian ice hockey player

- Born: April 7, 1995 (age 29); Saint-Hyacinthe, Quebec, Canada
- Height: 5 ft 11 in (180 cm)
- Weight: 185 lb (84 kg; 13 st 3 lb)
- Position: Goaltender
- Catches: Left
- ECHL team: Norfolk Admirals
- Playing career: 2015–present

Philippe Cadorette (born April 7, 1995) is a Canadian ice hockey goaltender. He is currently playing for the Norfolk Admirals of the ECHL.

Cadorette played major junior hockey with the Baie-Comeau Drakkar of the Quebec Major Junior Hockey League (QMJHL). Cadorette, who has played in the QMJHL since the 2011–12 season, was rewarded for his outstanding play when he was named to the 2013–14 QMJHL First All-Star Team.

After his junior career in the QMJHL in the 2014–15 season, Cadorette initially signed an amateur try-out contract with the Wheeling Nailers of the ECHL on April 25, 2015, however only trained with the club.

On August 6, 2015, Cadorette signed his first professional contract in agreeing to a one-year contract with the Norfolk Admirals of the ECHL, a secondary affiliate of the Edmonton Oilers.

== Awards and honours ==
| Award | Year |
|---|---|
| QMJHL First Team All-Star | 2013–14 |
