= Félix Girard =

Canadian ice hockey player

Felix Girard
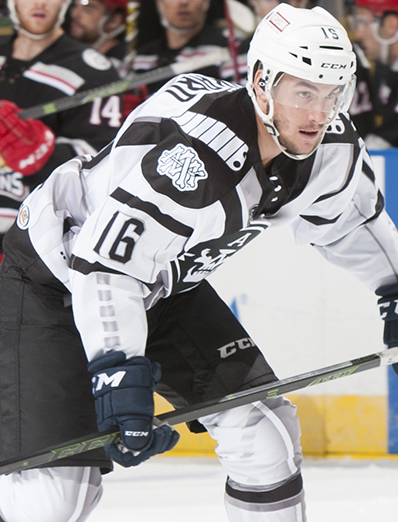
- Girard with the Milwaukee Admirals in 2015
- Born: May 9, 1994 (age 32) Lévis, Quebec, Canada
- Height: 5 ft 11 in (180 cm)
- Weight: 190 lb (86 kg; 13 st 8 lb)
- Position: Centre
- Shoots: Right
- Norway team Former teams: Frisk Asker; Milwaukee Admirals; San Antonio Rampage; Manitoba Moose; Fehérvár AV19; HC TWK Innsbruck; IF Björklöven
- NHL draft: 95th overall, 2013; Nashville Predators
- Playing career: 2014–present

Felix Girard (born May 9, 1994) is a Canadian professional ice hockey forward. He is currently playing with Frisk Asker of the Fjordkraftligaen (Norway). Girard was selected by the Nashville Predators in the 4th round (95th overall) of the 2013 NHL entry draft.

== Playing career ==
Serving as the captain of the Baie-Comeau Drakkar since the 2012–13 season, Girard was selected as the QMJHL's best defensive forward for both the 2012–13 and 2013–14 seasons, becoming the only player to have won the Guy Carbonneau Trophy twice.

In the final year of his entry-level contract in the 2016–17 season, on January 13, 2017, Girard was traded to the Colorado Avalanche in exchange for longtime Avalanche Cody McLeod and was immediately assigned to AHL affiliate, the San Antonio Rampage. He immediately rediscovered his scoring touch with the Rampage, surpassing his totals with the Admirals in contributing with 7 goals and 20 points in 38 games.

Girard remained with the Rampage through the 2017–18 season, appearing in every game he was unable to eclipse his previous year in totalling just 18 points. On June 25, 2018, as an impending restricted free agent, Girard was not tendered a qualifying offer by the Avalanche.

As a free agent, Girard was unable to attain another NHL contract, opting to sign a one-year AHL contract with the Manitoba Moose, affiliate to the Winnipeg Jets, on July 4, 2018.

After two seasons in the ICE Hockey League, Girard continued his career abroad in agreeing to a one-year contract with Swedish second division club, IF Björklöven of the Allsvenskan, on July 6, 2021.

== International play ==
Girard has competed internationally with Team Canada, winning a gold medal at the 2011 Ivan Hlinka Memorial Tournament and a bronze at the 2012 IIHF World U18 Championships. He was the final forward cut from Canada's roster for the 2014 World Junior Ice Hockey Championships.

== Career statistics ==
=== Regular season and playoffs ===
| | | | Regular season | | | | | Playoffs |
| Season | Team | League | GP | G | A | Pts | PIM | GP | G | A | Pts | PIM |
|---|---|---|---|---|---|---|---|---|---|---|---|---|
| 2009–10 | Seminaire St-Francois Blizzard | QMAAA | 41 | 7 | 11 | 18 | 68 | 3 | 1 | 1 | 2 | 15 |
| 2010–11 | Baie-Comeau Drakkar | QMJHL | 64 | 5 | 12 | 17 | 37 | — | — | — | — | — |
| 2011–12 | Baie-Comeau Drakkar | QMJHL | 60 | 6 | 15 | 21 | 63 | 8 | 2 | 1 | 3 | 14 |
| 2012–13 | Baie-Comeau Drakkar | QMJHL | 58 | 23 | 38 | 61 | 58 | 19 | 4 | 11 | 15 | 42 |
| 2013–14 | Baie-Comeau Drakkar | QMJHL | 58 | 11 | 32 | 43 | 130 | 21 | 4 | 8 | 12 | 43 |
| 2014–15 | Milwaukee Admirals | AHL | 61 | 4 | 5 | 9 | 54 | — | — | — | — | — |
| 2015–16 | Milwaukee Admirals | AHL | 76 | 5 | 16 | 21 | 62 | 3 | 0 | 0 | 0 | 2 |
| 2016–17 | Milwaukee Admirals | AHL | 35 | 3 | 5 | 8 | 29 | — | — | — | — | — |
| 2016–17 | San Antonio Rampage | AHL | 38 | 7 | 13 | 20 | 76 | — | — | — | — | — |
| 2017–18 | San Antonio Rampage | AHL | 76 | 12 | 6 | 18 | 74 | — | — | — | — | — |
| 2018–19 | Manitoba Moose | AHL | 70 | 5 | 13 | 18 | 85 | — | — | — | — | — |
| 2019–20 | Adirondack Thunder | ECHL | 3 | 3 | 1 | 4 | 0 | — | — | — | — | — |
| 2019–20 | Fehérvár AV19 | EBEL | 36 | 9 | 21 | 30 | 41 | — | — | — | — | — |
| 2020–21 | HC TWK Innsbruck | ICEHL | 46 | 9 | 32 | 41 | 90 | — | — | — | — | — |
| 2021–22 | IF Björklöven | Allsv | 45 | 4 | 17 | 21 | 69 | 18 | 0 | 4 | 4 | 35 |
| 2022–23 | Frisk Asker | NOR | 32 | 6 | 21 | 27 | 34 | 4 | 1 | 5 | 6 | 41 |
| AHL totals | | | 356 | 36 | 58 | 94 | 380 | 3 | 0 | 0 | 0 | 2 |

=== International ===
| Year | Team | Event | Result | GP | G | A | Pts | PIM |
|---|---|---|---|---|---|---|---|---|
| 2011 | Canada Quebec | U17 | 4th | 6 | 2 | 2 | 4 | 6 |
| 2011 | Canada | IH18 | 1st place, gold medalist(s) | 5 | 0 | 0 | 0 | 4 |
| 2012 | Canada | WJC18 | 3rd place, bronze medalist(s) | 5 | 1 | 0 | 1 | 6 |
| Junior totals | | | | 16 | 3 | 2 | 5 | 16 |

== Awards and honours ==
| Award | Year |
|---|---|
QMJHL
| Guy Carbonneau Trophy – Best Defensive Forward | 2013, 2014 |
International
| Ivan Hlinka Memorial Tournament – Gold with Team Canada | 2011 |
| IIHF World U18 Championship – Bronze with Team Canada | 2012 |
