= 2013–14 QMJHL season =

- League: Quebec Major Junior Hockey League
- Sport: Hockey
- Duration: Regular season September 12, 2013 – March 15, 2014; Playoffs; March 21, 2014 – May 13, 2014
- Teams: 18
- TV partner: Eastlink TV

Draft
- Top draft pick: Nicolas Roy
- Picked by: Cape Breton Screaming Eagles

Regular Season
- Jean Rougeau Trophy: Baie-Comeau Drakkar (2)
- Season MVP: Anthony Mantha (Val-d'Or Foreurs)
- Top scorer: Anthony Mantha (Val-d'Or Foreurs)

Playoffs
- Playoffs MVP: Antoine Bibeau (Foreurs)
- Finals champions: Val-d'Or Foreurs
- Runners-up: Baie-Comeau Drakkar

QMJHL seasons
- 2012–13 2014–15

2013–14 CHL season
- League: Canadian Hockey League
- Sport: Hockey
- Duration: OHL; September 2013 – March 2014; QMJHL; September 2012 – March 2013; WHL; September 2013 – March 2014
- Teams: 60
- TV partner(s): RDS; Rogers Sportsnet; Rogers TV; Shaw TV
- Season MVP: Anthony Mantha (Val-d'Or Foreurs) (QMHL)
- Top scorer: Connor Brown (Erie Otters) (OHL)

Memorial Cup
- Finals champions: Edmonton Oil Kings (WHL)
- Runners-up: Guelph Storm (OHL)

The 2013–14 QMJHL season is the 45th season of the Quebec Major Junior Hockey League (QMJHL). The regular season consisted of 18 teams playing 68 games each, beginning on September 12, 2013, and ending on March 15, 2014.

== Team changes ==
- The P.E.I. Rocket were renamed to the Charlottetown Islanders during the off-season.

== Regular season standings ==
Note: GP = Games played; W = Wins; L = Losses; OTL = Overtime losses; SL = Shootout losses; GF = Goals for; GA = Goals against; PTS = Points; x = clinched playoff berth; y = clinched division title

TELUS Maritimes Division	GP	W	L	OTL	SL	PTS	GF	GA	Rank
y-Halifax Mooseheads	68	47	18	0	3	97	292	182	2
x-Cape Breton Screaming Eagles	68	37	27	1	3	78	260	260	9
x-Moncton Wildcats	68	33	32	0	3	69	214	226	12
x-Acadie–Bathurst Titan	68	22	40	4	2	50	144	249	14
x-Charlottetown Islanders	68	21	39	3	5	50	186	256	15
Saint John Sea Dogs	68	19	44	2	3	43	165	255	17

TELUS East Division	GP	W	L	OTL	SL	PTS	GF	GA	Rank
y-Baie-Comeau Drakkar	68	47	16	2	3	99	255	170	1
x-Rimouski Océanic	68	45	16	3	4	97	258	194	4
x-Quebec Remparts	68	39	17	5	7	90	255	209	6
x-Victoriaville Tigres	68	33	27	5	3	74	229	219	11
x-Chicoutimi Saguenéens	68	27	40	1	0	55	183	254	13
x-Shawinigan Cataractes	68	20	39	4	5	49	163	251	16

TELUS West Division	GP	W	L	OTL	SL	PTS	GF	GA	Rank
y-Val-d'Or Foreurs	68	46	20	1	1	94	306	213	3
x-Blainville-Boisbriand Armada	68	41	17	5	5	92	243	196	5
x-Drummondville Voltigeurs	68	43	21	1	3	90	233	179	7
x-Gatineau Olympiques	68	41	23	1	3	86	254	218	8
x-Rouyn-Noranda Huskies	68	35	28	3	2	75	254	243	10
Sherbrooke Phoenix	68	16	43	4	5	41	180	300	18

== Scoring leaders ==
Note: GP = Games played; G = Goals; A = Assists; Pts = Points; PIM = Penalty minutes

Player	Team	GP	G	A	Pts	PIM
Anthony Mantha	Val-d'Or Foreurs	57	57	63	120	75
Marcus Power	Rouyn-Noranda Huskies	67	30	79	109	43
Jonathan Drouin	Halifax Mooseheads	46	29	79	108	43
Nikolaj Ehlers	Halifax Mooseheads	63	49	55	104	51
Louick Marcotte	Val-d'Or Foreurs	67	42	58	100	47
Anthony Duclair	Quebec Remparts	59	50	49	99	56
Guillaume Gélinas	Val-d'Or Foreurs	67	23	69	92	81
Émile Poirier	Gatineau Olympiques	63	43	44	87	129
Cameron Darcy	Cape Breton Screaming Eagles	65	35	47	82	51
Darcy Ashley	Halifax Mooseheads	48	30	50	80	72

== Leading goaltenders ==
Note: GP = Games played; Mins = Minutes played; W = Wins; L = Losses: OTL = Overtime losses; SL = Shootout losses; GA = Goals Allowed; SO = Shutouts; GAA = Goals against average

Player	Team	GP	Mins	W	L	OTL	SL	GA	SO	Sv%	GAA
Zachary Fucale	Halifax Mooseheads	50	2916	36	9	0	3	110	6	0.907	2.26
Philippe Cadorette	Baie-Comeau Drakkar	52	3031	36	13	2	1	119	7	0.916	2.35
Louis-Philip Guindon	Drummondville Voltigeurs	56	3198	32	20	1	2	130	6	0.905	2.44
Philippe Desrosiers	Rimouski Océanic	52	2920	31	14	3	4	129	5	0.907	2.65
Étienne Marcoux	Blainville-Boisbriand Armada	50	2855	26	15	4	3	135	3	0.894	2.84

== 2014 President's Cup playoffs ==
Round 1
1	Baie-Comeau	4
16	Shawinigan	0
2	Halifax	4
15	Charlottetown	0
3	Val-d'Or	4
14	Acadie–Bathurst	0
4	Rimouski	4
13	Chicoutimi	0
Note: Pairings are re-seeded after the first and second rounds.
5	Blainville-Boisbriand	4
12	Moncton	2
6	Drummondville	4
11	Victoriaville	1
7	Quebec	1
10	Rouyn-Noranda	4
8	Gatineau	4
9	Cape Breton	0

Quarter-finals
1	Baie-Comeau	4
10	Rouyn-Noranda	0
2	Halifax	4
8	Gatineau	1
3	Val-d'Or	4
6	Drummondville	2
4	Rimouski	3
5	Blainville-Boisbriand	4

Semi-finals
1	Baie-Comeau	4
5	Blainville-Boisbriand	3
2	Halifax	3
3	Val-d'Or	4

President's Cup Championship
1	Baie-Comeau	3
3	Val-d'Or	4

== First round ==
=== (1) Baie-Comeau Drakkar vs. (16) Shawinigan Cataractes ===
March 21	Baie-Comeau Drakkar	5 – 1	Shawinigan Cataractes	Centre Henry-Leonard	Recap
3:15 - Robbie Graham (1); 6:57 - Jérémy Grégoire (1)		First period	No scoring
2:58 - pp - Denis Gorbunov (1); 12:00 - pp - Charles Hudon (1)		Second period	No scoring
13:54 - Robbie Graham (2)		Third period	Alexis D'Aoust (1) - 15:10
Philippe Cadorette (27 saves / 28 shots)		Goalie stats	Marvin Cupper (33 saves / 38 shots)

March 22	Baie-Comeau Drakkar	3 – 1	Shawinigan Cataractes	Centre Henry-Leonard	Recap
No scoring		First period	No scoring
10:38 - Alexandre Ranger (1)		Second period	No scoring
11:23 - Gabriel Verpaelst (1); 19:39 - pp - en - Charles Hudon (2)		Third period	Alex Filiatrault (1) - 17:45
Philippe Cadorette (28 saves / 29 shots)		Goalie stats	Marvin Cupper (61 saves / 63 shots)

March 25	Shawinigan Cataractes	0 – 3	Baie-Comeau Drakkar	Centre Bionest de Shawinigan	Recap
No scoring		First period	Jérémy Grégoire (2) - 4:31
No scoring		Second period	Robbie Graham (3) - 2:22
No scoring		Third period	Francis Turbide (1) - 17:51
Marvin Cupper (50 saves / 53 shots)		Goalie stats	Philippe Cadorette (26 saves / 26 shots)

March 26	Shawinigan Cataractes	2 – 6	Baie-Comeau Drakkar	Centre Bionest de Shawinigan	Recap
No scoring		First period	No scoring
13:24 - pp - Alexandre Delisle-Houde (1)		Second period	Jérémy Grégoire (3) - pp - 6:53; Félix Girard (1) - pp - 7:23; Jérémy Grégoire (4) - sh - 11:56
17:03 - Jérémy Auger (1)		Third period	Gabryel Paquin-Boudreau (1) - 7:22; Charles Hudon (3) - pp - 12:43; Maxime St-Cyr (1) - pp - 16:28
Marvin Cupper (42 saves / 48 shots)		Goalie stats	Philippe Cadorette (25 saves / 27 shots)

Baie-Comeau wins series 4 – 0

=== (2) Halifax Mooseheads vs. (15) Charlottetown Islanders ===
March 21	Halifax Mooseheads	6 – 3	Charlottetown Islanders	Halifax Metro Centre	Recap
18:17 - pp - Nikolaj Ehlers (1)		First period	No scoring
1:18 - pp - Luca Ciampini (1); 14:15 - Danny Moynihan (1); 15:52 - Jonathan Drouin (1)		Second period	Daniel Sprong (1) - 2:04; Alexandre Goulet (1) - pp - 11:53
7:20 - pp - Andrew Shewfelt (1); 15:32 - Danny Moynihan (2)		Third period	Anthony Cortese (1) - pp - 15:15
Zachary Fucale (15 saves / 18 shots)		Goalie stats	Mason McDonald (45 saves / 51 shots)

March 22	Halifax Mooseheads	7 – 1	Charlottetown Islanders	Halifax Metro Centre	Recap
9:20 - pp - Philippe Gadoury (1)		First period	Daniel Sprong (2) - 5:23
16:03 - Philippe Gadoury (2); 17:45 - Jonathan Drouin (2)		Second period	No scoring
5:01 - Darcy Ashley (1); 11:30 - pp - Nikolaj Ehlers (2); 14:41 - pp - Jonathan Drouin (3); 16:17 - pp - Andrew Shewfelt (2)		Third period	No scoring
Zachary Fucale (19 saves / 20 shots)		Goalie stats	Mason McDonald (42 saves / 49 shots)

March 25	Charlottetown Islanders	1 – 4	Halifax Mooseheads	Eastlink Centre	Recap
4:08 - Daniel Sprong (3)		First period	No scoring
No scoring		Second period	Philippe Gadoury (3) - pp - 4:42
No scoring		Third period	Philippe Gadoury (4) - pp - 6:59; Jonathan Drouin (4) - 11:17; Philippe Gadoury (5) - 17:39
Mason McDonald (38 saves / 42 shots)		Goalie stats	Zachary Fucale (16 saves / 17 shots)

March 27	Charlottetown Islanders	3 – 11	Halifax Mooseheads	Eastlink Centre	Recap
No scoring		First period	Nikolaj Ehlers (3) - pp - 14:28; MacKenzie Weegar (1) - 17:58; Timo Meier (1) - 18:50
No scoring		Second period	Jonathan Drouin (5) - 1:27; Danny Moynihan (3) - 2:32; MacKenzie Weegar (2) - pp - 10:17; Nikolaj Ehlers (4) - 12:07; Jonathan Drouin (6) - 12:34
15:51 - Daniel Sprong (4); 16:12 - Kameron Kielly (1); 19:30 - pp - Troy Vance (1)		Third period	Luca Ciampini (2) - sh - 6:19; Connor Moynihan (1) - 8:46; Samuel Leblanc (1) - 18:20
Mason McDonald (10 saves / 15 shots); Éric Brassard (23 saves / 29 shots)		Goalie stats	Zachary Fucale (16 saves / 16 shots); Kevin Darveau (5 saves / 8 shots)

Halifax wins series 4 – 0

=== (3) Val-d'Or Foreurs vs. (14) Acadie-Bathurst Titan ===
March 21	Val-d'Or Foreurs	4 – 1	Acadie-Bathurst Titan	Centre Air Creebec	Recap
2:55 - Guillaume Gélinas (1); 19:01 - Anthony Richard (1)		First period	No scoring
16:07 - Samuel Henley (1)		Second period	No scoring
8:43 - Anthony Richard (2)		Third period	Aaron Kerr (1) - 14:55
Antoine Bibeau (15 saves / 16 shots)		Goalie stats	Jacob Brennan (38 saves / 42 shots)

March 22	Val-d'Or Foreurs	3 – 0	Acadie-Bathurst Titan	Centre Air Creebec	Recap
No scoring		First period	No scoring
0:58 - Samuel Henley (2)		Second period	No scoring
1:19 - Samuel Henley (3); 18:02 - sh - en - Pierre-Maxime Poudrier (1)		Third period	No scoring
Antoine Bibeau (19 saves / 19 shots)		Goalie stats	Jacob Brennan (34 saves / 36 shots)

March 25	Acadie-Bathurst Titan	2 – 3	OT	Val-d'Or Foreurs	K. C. Irving Regional Centre	Recap
No scoring		First period		No scoring
No scoring		Second period		Louick Marcotte (1) - sh - 9:53
15:31 - Nicholas Blanchard (1); 17:04 - pp - Scott Oke (1)		Third period		Louick Marcotte (2) - 11:12
No scoring		First overtime period		Anthony Mantha (1) - 2:48
Jacob Brennan (39 saves / 42 shots)		Goalie stats		Antoine Bibeau (17 saves / 19 shots)

March 27	Acadie-Bathurst Titan	2 – 8	Val-d'Or Foreurs	K. C. Irving Regional Centre	Recap
14:16 - pp - Guillaume Brisebois (1)		First period	Louick Marcotte (3) - pp - 16:10; Guillaume Gélinas (2) - pp - 16:37; Nicolas Aubé-Kubel (1) - pp - 17:39
No scoring		Second period	Phil Pietroniro (1) - 2:32; Nicolas Aubé-Kubel (2) - 15:52
17:24 - pp - Alexandros Soumakis (1)		Third period	Anthony Mantha (2) - 5:56; Anthony Mantha (3) - 6:18; Anthony Richard (3) - 18:17
Jacob Brennan (22 saves / 29 shots); Miguel Sullivan (6 saves / 7 shots)		Goalie stats	Antoine Bibeau (13 saves / 14 shots); Keven Bouchard (5 saves / 6 shots)

Val-d'Or wins series 4 – 0

=== (4) Rimouski Océanic vs. (13) Chicoutimi Saguenéens ===
March 21	Rimouski Océanic	5 – 3	Chicoutimi Saguenéens	Colisée de Rimouski	Recap
3:40 - sh - William Couture (1); 9:51 - pp - Samuel Morin (1)		First period	Dominic Beauchemin (1) - pp - 7:00; William Gignac (1) - pp - 14:54
11:16 - Sébastien Sylvestre (1)		Second period	No scoring
16:27 - Jimmy Oligny (1); 19:59 - en - Sébastien Sylvestre (2)		Third period	Janne Puhakka (1) - pp - 14:56
Philippe Desrosiers (13 saves / 16 shots)		Goalie stats	Julio Billia (36 saves / 40 shots)

March 22	Rimouski Océanic	6 – 1	Chicoutimi Saguenéens	Colisée de Rimouski	Recap
9:08 - François Beauchemin (1)		First period	No scoring
0:32 - pp - Jimmy Oligny (2); 16:58 - Samuel Morin (2)		Second period	Dominic Beauchemin (2) - pp - 10:55
3:28 - Frédérik Gauthier (1); 4:57 - Samuel Morin (3); 13:12 - Beau Rusk (1)		Third period	No scoring
Philippe Desrosiers (17 saves / 18 shots)		Goalie stats	Julio Billia (22 saves / 27 shots); Domenic Graham (3 saves / 4 shots)

March 25	Chicoutimi Saguenéens	0 – 4	Rimouski Océanic	Centre Georges-Vézina	Recap
No scoring		First period	Michael Joly (1) - pp - 12:22
No scoring		Second period	Peter Trainor (1) - 7:34; Michael Joly (2) - sh - 16:32
No scoring		Third period	Michael Joly (3) - pp - 8:53
Domenic Graham (30 saves / 34 shots)		Goalie stats	Philippe Desrosiers (19 saves / 19 shots)

March 26	Chicoutimi Saguenéens	0 – 5	Rimouski Océanic	Centre Georges-Vézina	Recap
No scoring		First period	Michael Joly (4) - 1:04; Samuel Morin (4) - pp - 5:15; Andrew Picco (1) - 5:49
No scoring		Second period	François Beauchemin (2) - 2:09; Alexis Loiseau (1) - pp - 15:53
No scoring		Third period	No scoring
Julio Billia (27 saves / 32 shots)		Goalie stats	Philippe Desrosiers (19 saves / 19 shots); Olivier Tremblay (7 saves / 7 shots)

Rimouski wins series 4 – 0

=== (5) Blainville-Boisbriand Armada vs. (12) Moncton Wildcats ===
March 20	Blainville-Boisbriand Armada	3 – 2	Moncton Wildcats	Centre d'Excellence Sports Rousseau	Recap
12:13 - pp - Ryan Tesink (1); 12:22 - Danick Martel (1)		First period	No scoring
12:09 - Danick Martel (2)		Second period	No scoring
No scoring		Third period	Ivan Barbashev (1) - 2:34; Will Smith (1) - 16:02
Étienne Marcoux (23 saves / 25 shots)		Goalie stats	Alex Dubeau (21 saves / 24 shots)

March 21	Blainville-Boisbriand Armada	5 – 6	OT	Moncton Wildcats	Centre d'Excellence Sports Rousseau	Recap
6:58 - pp - Ņikita Jevpalovs (1)		First period		Vladimir Tkachev (1) - 11:07; Ivan Barbashev (2) - pp - 17:38
8:28 - Marcus Hinds (1)		Second period		Christophe Lalonde (1) - pp - 5:11; Conor Garland (1) - pp - 13:29
4:54 - pp - Ņikita Jevpalovs (2); 16:24 - Ryan Tesink (2); 19:25 - Ņikita Jevpalovs (3)		Third period		Christopher Caissy (1) - 13:04
No scoring		First overtime period		Vladimir Tkachev (2) - 16:58
Étienne Marcoux (20 saves / 26 shots)		Goalie stats		Alex Dubeau (41 saves / 46 shots)

March 24	Moncton Wildcats	1 – 4	Blainville-Boisbriand Armada	Moncton Coliseum	Recap
No scoring		First period	No scoring
No scoring		Second period	Philippe Sanche (1) - pp - 7:16
12:53 - Vladimir Tkachev (3)		Third period	Danick Martel (3) - 18:31; Ņikita Jevpalovs (4) - en - 19:15; Ryan Tesink (3) - 19:45
Alex Dubeau (31 saves / 34 shots)		Goalie stats	Étienne Marcoux (17 saves / 18 shots)

March 25	Moncton Wildcats	3 – 4	Blainville-Boisbriand Armada	Moncton Coliseum	Recap
No scoring		First period	Danick Martel (4) - 2:52; Daniel Walcott (1) - pp - 12:41
No scoring		Second period	Danick Martel (5) - 5:16; Ryan Tesink (4) - 19:41
4:01 - pp - Vladimir Tkachev (4); 7:19 - pp - Vladimir Tkachev (5); 13:15 - Vladimir Tkachev (6)		Third period	No scoring
Alex Dubeau (26 saves / 30 shots); Jason Rioux (2 saves / 2 shots)		Goalie stats	Étienne Marcoux (20 saves / 23 shots)

March 27	Moncton Wildcats	3 – 2	Blainville-Boisbriand Armada	Moncton Coliseum	Recap
Conor Garland (2) - pp - 8:20; Ivan Barbashev (3) - 9:57		First period	13:30 - Samuel Tremblay (1)
No scoring		Second period	16:49 - Frédéric Bergeron (1)
Ivan Barbashev (4) - 3:00		Third period	No scoring
Alex Dubeau (33 saves / 35 shots)		Goalie stats	Étienne Marcoux (25 saves / 28 shots)

March 30	Blainville-Boisbriand Armada	4 – 2	Moncton Wildcats	Centre d'Excellence Sports Rousseau	Recap
Samuel Tremblay (2) - 4:47; Olivier Picard (1) - 10:54		First period	No scoring
Daniel Walcott (2) - pp - 18:21		Second period	19:29 - Matthew Klebanskyj (1); 19:49 - Vladimir Tkachev (7)
Ņikita Jevpalovs (5) - 12:41		Third period	No scoring
Étienne Marcoux (28 saves / 30 shots)		Goalie stats	Alex Dubeau (30 saves / 34 shots)

Blainville-Boisbriand wins series 4 – 2

=== (6) Drummondville Voltigeurs vs. (11) Victoriaville Tigres ===
March 21	Drummondville Voltigeurs	3 – 4	Victoriaville Tigres	Centre Marcel Dionne	Recap
2:27 - Matthew Boudens (1)		First period	No scoring
15:04 - Olivier Caouette (1)		Second period	Cameron Yarwood (1) - pp - 3:01; Yan-Pavel Laplante (1) - sh - 4:06; Jonathan-Ismaël Diaby (1) - 19:28
8:57 - William Carrier (1)		Third period	Julien Leduc (1) - 0:27
Louis-Philip Guindon (14 saves / 18 shots)		Goalie stats	François Tremblay (33 saves / 36 shots)

March 22	Drummondville Voltigeurs	6 – 5	Victoriaville Tigres	Centre Marcel Dionne	Recap
1:26 - pp - Jérome Verrier (1); 15:46 - Charles-David Beaudoin (1)		First period	Antoine Marcoux (1) - 9:17
3:23 - pp - Georgs Golovkovs (1); 9:15 - Matthew Boudens (2)		Second period	Jean-François Plante (1) - 16:37; Philippe Hudon (1) - 18:00
1:41 - Charles-David Beaudoin (2); 15:17 - Christophe Lalancette (1)		Third period	Angelo Miceli (1) - 0:28; Philippe Hudon (2) - 6:26
Louis-Philip Guindon (28 saves / 33 shots)		Goalie stats	François Tremblay (26 saves / 32 shots)

March 25	Victoriaville Tigres	3 – 6	Drummondville Voltigeurs	Colisée Desjardins	Recap
5:26 - Yan Pavel Laplante (2); 18:59 - Angelo Miceli (2)		First period	Alexandre Grand-Maison (1) - 6:47; Matthew Boudens (3) - pp - 12:06
11:20 - pp - Philippe Hudon (3)		Second period	Alexandre Grand-Maison (2) - 18:32
No scoring		Third period	Joey Ratelle (1) - 4:45; Olivier Caouette (2) - pp - 14:15; Frédérick Gaudreau (1) - en - 18:28
François Tremblay (24 saves / 29 shots)		Goalie stats	Louis-Philip Guindon (19 saves / 22 shots)

March 26	Victoriaville Tigres	2 – 3	Drummondville Voltigeurs	Colisée Desjardins	Recap
No scoring		First period	No scoring
No scoring		Second period	Jérome Verrier (2) - pp - 12:23
1:21 - Yan Pavel Laplante (3); 16:21 - Lukas Pozgay (1)		Third period	Alexandre Grand-Maison (3) - 3:07; Frédérick Gaudreau (2) - 19:52
François Tremblay (24 saves / 27 shots)		Goalie stats	Louis-Philip Guindon (29 saves / 31 shots)

March 28	Drummondville Voltigeurs	5 – 4	Victoriaville Tigres	Centre Marcel Dionne	Recap
1:01 - Frédérick Gaudreau (3); 13:08 - Frédérick Gaudreau (4)		First period	Cameron Yarwood (2) - pp - 11:58
5:46 - pp - Frédérick Gaudreau (5); 13:00 - Frédérick Gaudreau (6); 18:11 - Frédérick Gaudreau (7)		Second period	Julien Leduc (2) - sh - 7:15; Carl-Antoine Delisle (1) - 14:11
No scoring		Third period	Julien Leduc (3) - 14:38
Louis-Philip Guindon (26 saves / 30 shots)		Goalie stats	François Tremblay (18 saves / 22 shots); Brandon Whitney (12 saves / 13 shots)

Drummondville wins series 4 – 1

=== (7) Quebec Remparts vs. (10) Rouyn-Noranda Huskies ===
March 21	Quebec Remparts	4 – 5	OT	Rouyn-Noranda Huskies	Colisée Pepsi	Recap
6:03 - pp - Cody Donaghey (1); 14:52 - Adam Chapman (1)		First period		No scoring
18:48 - pp - Adam Chapman (2)		Second period		Jason Fuchs (1) - 2:14; Jérémy Lauzon (1) - 16:33
16:42 - Nick Sörensen (1)		Third period		Jérémy Lauzon (2) - 7:59; Mathieu Lemay (1) - 10:04
No scoring		First overtime period		Ryan Penny (1) - 4:11
François Brassard (30 saves / 35 shots)		Goalie stats		Alexandre Bélanger (29 saves / 33 shots)

March 22	Quebec Remparts	7 – 3	Rouyn-Noranda Huskies	Colisée Pepsi	Recap
16:17 - pp - Adam Chapman (3)		First period	Jack Nevins (1) - 9:32
3:43 - pp - Nick Sörensen (2); 13:49 - pp - Nick Sörensen (3); 18:39 - pp - Kurt Etchegary (1); 18:45 - Fabrice Herzog (1)		Second period	Jean-Sébastien Dea (1) - pp - 15:08
1:47 - pp - Nick Sörensen (4); 9:56 - Fabrice Herzog (2)		Third period	Jean-Sébastien Dea (2) - sh - 1:11
François Brassard (34 saves / 37 shots)		Goalie stats	Alexandre Bélanger (10 saves / 17 shots); Guillaume Decelles (5 saves / 5 shots)

March 25	Rouyn-Noranda Huskies	5 – 2	Quebec Remparts	Aréna Iamgold	Recap
No scoring		First period	Nick Sörensen (5) - pp - 10:23
5:30 - Mathieu Lemay (2); 17:00 - Francis Perron (1); 19:05 - Francis Beauvillier (1)		Second period	No scoring
11:56 - Jean-Sébastien Dea (3); 19:58 - Mathieu Lemay (3)		Third period	Nick Sörensen (6) - 0:10
Alexandre Bélanger (19 saves / 21 shots)		Goalie stats	François Brassard (49 saves / 54 shots)

March 26	Rouyn-Noranda Huskies	4 – 1	Quebec Remparts	Aréna Iamgold	Recap
14:24 - Francis Beauvillier (2)		First period	No scoring
14:53 - Ryan Penny (2)		Second period	Mikhail Grigorenko (1) - 6:48
6:42 - Jack Nevins (2); 18:38 - en - Ryan Penny (3)		Third period	No scoring
Alexandre Bélanger (22 saves / 23 shots)		Goalie stats	François Brassard (26 saves / 29 shots)

March 28	Rouyn-Noranda Huskies	6 – 2	Quebec Remparts	Aréna Iamgold	Recap
Liam O'Brien (1) - pp - 15:55		First period	4:50 - pp - Fabrice Herzog (3)
Ryan Penny (4) - 5:20; Quinn O'Brien (1) - 18:50		Second period	No scoring
Jean-Sébastien Dea (4) - 4:05; Jack Nevins (3) - pp - 15:25; Marcus Power (1) - en - 18:32		Third period	8:13 - pp - Adam Erne (1)
Alexandre Bélanger (28 saves / 30 shots)		Goalie stats	François Brassard (21 saves / 26 shots)

Rouyn-Noranda wins series 4 – 1

=== (8) Gatineau Olympiques vs. (9) Cape Breton Screaming Eagles ===
March 21	Gatineau Olympiques	7 – 2	Cape Breton Screaming Eagles	Robert Guertin Centre	Recap
7:53 - sh - Simon Tardif-Richard (1)		First period	Timothé Simard (1) - ps - 18:30
7:18 - Martin Réway (1); 17:06 - Simon Tardif-Richard (2)		Second period	No scoring
2:52 - Martin Réway (2); 6:06 - Simon Tardif-Richard (3); 7:50 - Émile Poirier (1); 13:59 - Václav Karabáček (1)		Third period	Clark Bishop (1) - 10:46
Robert Steeves (18 saves / 20 shots)		Goalie stats	Alex Bureau (17 saves / 22 shots); Zachary Fortin (5 saves / 7 shots)

March 22	Gatineau Olympiques	8 – 2	Cape Breton Screaming Eagles	Robert Guertin Centre	Recap
1:05 - Václav Karabáček (2); 17:56 - Émile Poirier (2)		First period	Cameron Darcy (1) - 0:34
9:22 - Émile Poirier (3); 18:50 - Simon Tardif-Richard (4)		Second period	Raphaël Corriveau (1) - pp - 13:25
4:59 - pp - Vincent Dunn (1); 8:56 - Adam Stevens (1); 16:03 - pp - Émile Poirier (4); 19:10 - sh - Jonathan Bourcier (1)		Third period	No scoring
Robert Steeves (22 saves / 24 shots)		Goalie stats	Alex Bureau (21 saves / 27 shots); Zachary Fortin (3 saves / 5 shots)

March 25	Cape Breton Screaming Eagles	2 – 7	Gatineau Olympiques	Centre 200	Recap
6:04 - Julien Pelletier (1); 12:16 - Kyle Farrell (1)		First period	Simon Tardif-Richard (5) - 0:32; Jonathan Bourcier (2) - 4:28; Émile Poirier (5) - 18:27
No scoring		Second period	Václav Karabáček (3) - 0:25; Václav Karabáček (4) - 8:54; Adam Stevens (2) - 11:47; Alexis Pépin (1) - 13:56
No scoring		Third period	No scoring
Zachary Fortin (22 saves / 26 shots); Alex Bureau (11 saves / 14 shots)		Goalie stats	Robert Steeves (18 saves / 20 shots)

March 27	Cape Breton Screaming Eagles	1 – 7	Gatineau Olympiques	Centre 200	Recap
No scoring		First period	Martin Réway (3) - 6:30
No scoring		Second period	Taylor Burke (1) - 0:46; Émile Poirier (6) - 5:10; Alexis Pépin (2) - 13:11; Alexis Pépin (3) - 13:46
14:13 - pp - Maxim Lazarev (1)		Third period	Martin Réway (4) - 5:53; Simon Tardif-Richard (6) - 11:48
Zachary Fortin (24 saves / 31 shots)		Goalie stats	Robert Steeves (17 saves / 18 shots)

Gatineau wins series 4 – 0

== Quarter-finals ==
=== (1) Baie-Comeau Drakkar Vs. (10) Rouyn-Noranda Huskies ===
April 4	Baie-Comeau Drakkar	4 – 1	Rouyn-Noranda Huskies	Centre Henry-Leonard	Recap
No scoring		First period	Jack Nevins (4) - 8:03
1:01 - Maxime St-Cyr (2); 15:09 - Gabriel Verpaelst (2)		Second period	No scoring
10:43 - Alexandre Ranger (2); 12:43 - Charles Hudon (4)		Third period	No scoring
Philippe Cadorette (25 saves / 26 shots)		Goalie stats	Alexandre Bélanger (30 saves / 34 shots)

April 5	Baie-Comeau Drakkar	5 – 2	Rouyn-Noranda Huskies	Centre Henry-Leonard	Recap
11:32 - Maxime St-Cyr (3)		First period	No scoring
11:07 - Maxime St-Cyr (4); 15:43 - Frédéric Gamelin (1)		Second period	Marcus Power (2) - sh - 8:39
5:38 - Valentin Zykov (1); 18:56 - en - Alec Jon Banville (1)		Third period	Jack Nevins (5) - 11:56
Philippe Cadorette (20 saves / 22 shots)		Goalie stats	Alexandre Bélanger (42 saves / 46 shots)

April 8	Rouyn-Noranda Huskies	2 – 4	Baie-Comeau Drakkar	Aréna Iamgold	Recap
No scoring		First period	Alexandre Ranger (3) - 3:15
No scoring		Second period	Frédéric Gamelin (2) - 8:56
3:44 - Jean-Sébastien Dea (5); 18:51 - Redgie Bois (1)		Third period	Charles Hudon (5) - 9:42; Gabriel Verpaelst (3) - 17:09
Alexandre Bélanger (31 saves / 35 shots)		Goalie stats	Philippe Cadorette (23 saves / 25 shots)

April 9	Rouyn-Noranda Huskies	2 – 4	Baie-Comeau Drakkar	Aréna Iamgold	Recap
No scoring		First period	Valentin Zykov (2) - pp - 7:58
No scoring		Second period	Charles Hudon (6) - 2:37; Denis Gorbunov (2) - pp - 19:24; Alexandre Ranger (4) - 19:38
1:39 - Mathieu Lemay (4)		Third period	No scoring
Alexandre Bélanger (35 saves / 39 shots)		Goalie stats	Philippe Cadorette (17 saves / 19 shots)

Baie-Comeau wins series 4 – 0

=== (2) Halifax Mooseheads Vs. (8) Gatineau Olympiques ===
April 4	Halifax Mooseheads	4 – 1	Gatineau Olympiques	Halifax Metro Centre	Recap
12:21 - pp - Andrew Ryan (1)		First period	No scoring
No scoring		Second period	No scoring
4:56 - sh - Andrew Ryan (2); 8:09 - pp - Philippe Gadoury (6); 10:35 - pp - Brent Andrews (1)		Third period	Jonathan Bourcier (3) - pp - 5:58
Zachary Fucale (25 saves / 26 shots)		Goalie stats	Robert Steeves (29 saves / 33 shots)

April 5	Halifax Mooseheads	6 – 2	Gatineau Olympiques	Halifax Metro Centre	Recap
3:22 - pp - MacKenzie Weegar (3)		First period	Martin Réway (5) - 9:28
2:17 - Andrew Shewfelt (3); 7:56 - Matt Murphy (1); 11:25 - pp - Nikolaj Ehlers (5)		Second period	No scoring
9:40 - pp - Nikolaj Ehlers (6); 13:32 - pp - Philippe Gadoury (7)		Third period	Vincent Dunn (2) - pp - 16:05
Zachary Fucale (25 saves / 27 shots)		Goalie stats	Robert Steeves (25 saves / 31 shots)

April 8	Gatineau Olympiques	5 – 2	Halifax Mooseheads	Robert Guertin Centre	Recap
5:04 - Taylor Burke (2); 11:45 - pp - Alexis Pépin (4)		First period	Jonathan Drouin (7) - 4:22
5:43 - Vincent Dunn (3)		Second period	Jonathan Drouin (8) - pp - 13:14
1:34 - pp - Václav Karabáček (5); 17:56 - en - Émile Poirier (7)		Third period	No scoring
Robert Steeves (25 saves / 27 shots)		Goalie stats	Zachary Fucale (26 saves / 30 shots)

April 9	Gatineau Olympiques	2 – 4	Halifax Mooseheads	Robert Guertin Centre	Recap
No scoring		First period	No scoring
11:05 - Simon Tardif-Richard (7)		Second period	Luca Ciampini (3) - 2:45; MacKenzie Weegar (4) - pp - 4:24; Nikolaj Ehlers (7) - pp - 5:24
3:18 - Václav Karabáček (6)		Third period	Brent Andrews (2) - en - 19:05
Robert Steeves (19 saves / 22 shots)		Goalie stats	Zachary Fucale (26 saves / 28 shots)

April 11	Gatineau Olympiques	1 – 4	Halifax Mooseheads	Robert Guertin Centre	Recap
Alexandre Carrier (1) - 3:45		First period	5:40 - pp - Nikolaj Ehlers (8)
No scoring		Second period	16:43 - pp - Jonathan Drouin (9); 19:24 - Luca Ciampini (4)
No scoring		Third period	3:03 - Philippe Gadoury (8)
Robert Steeves (25 saves / 29 shots)		Goalie stats	Zachary Fucale (22 saves / 23 shots)

Halifax wins series 4 – 1

=== (3) Val-d'Or Foreurs Vs. (6) Drummondville Voltigeurs ===
April 4	Val-d'Or Foreurs	3 – 4	OT	Drummondville Voltigeurs	Centre Air Creebec	Recap
No scoring		First period		Frédérick Gaudreau (8) - 9:15; Alexandre Grand-Maison (4) - 12:40
14:05 - Guillaume Gélinas (3)		Second period		Frédérick Gaudreau (9) - 15:31
7:19 - Anthony Mantha (4); 19:26 - Anthony Mantha (5)		Third period		No scoring
No scoring		First overtime period		Jérome Verrier (3) - 8:34
Antoine Bibeau (18 saves / 22 shots)		Goalie stats		Louis-Philip Guindon (46 saves / 49 shots)

April 5	Val-d'Or Foreurs	4 – 3	OT	Drummondville Voltigeurs	Centre Air Creebec	Recap
4:42 - pp - Anthony Richard (4); 14:01 - Anthony Beauregard (1)		First period		No scoring
11:38 - Olivier Galipeau (1)		Second period		Joey Ratelle (2) - 6:58; Matthew Boudens (4) - 10:42; Olivier Caouette (3) - 19:19
No scoring		Third period		No scoring
2:04 - Louick Marcotte (4)		First overtime period		No scoring
Antoine Bibeau (34 saves / 37 shots)		Goalie stats		Louis-Philip Guindon (33 saves / 37 shots)

April 8	Drummondville Voltigeurs	2 – 5	Val-d'Or Foreurs	Centre Marcel Dionne	Recap
3:58 - Joey Ratelle (3)		First period	Anthony Mantha (6) - 7:04
12:34 - Joey Ratelle (4)		Second period	Louick Marcotte (5) - 13:30
No scoring		Third period	Samuel Henley (4) - pp - 10:36; Phil Pietroniro (2) - 16:11; Anthony Mantha (7) - pp - 18:57
Louis-Philip Guindon (22 saves / 27 shots)		Goalie stats	Antoine Bibeau (25 saves / 27 shots)

April 9	Drummondville Voltigeurs	3 – 2	Val-d'Or Foreurs	Centre Marcel Dionne	Recap
5:12 - Ryan Culkin (1); 13:11 - pp - Joey Ratelle (5)		First period	No scoring
No scoring		Second period	Shawn Ouellette-St-Amant (1) - 13:59; Phil Pietroniro (3) - 14:23
17:20 - Alexandre Grand-Maison (5)		Third period	No scoring
Louis-Philip Guindon (39 saves / 41 shots)		Goalie stats	Antoine Bibeau (26 saves / 29 shots)

April 11	Val-d'Or Foreurs	5 – 2	Drummondville Voltigeurs	Centre Air Creebec	Recap
1:15 - pp - Anthony Mantha (8); 9:02 - Anthony Mantha (9)		First period	No scoring
8:50 - Nicolas Aubé-Kubel (3); 17:24 - sh - Anthony Mantha (10)		Second period	Frédérick Gaudreau (10) - pp - 4:37
2:59 - Louick Marcotte (6)		Third period	Philippe Pelletier-Leblanc (1) - 2:06
Antoine Bibeau (30 saves / 32 shots)		Goalie stats	Louis-Philip Guindon (22 saves / 27 shots); Joe Fleschler (7 saves / 7 shots)

April 13	Drummondville Voltigeurs	2 – 3	Val-d'Or Foreurs	Centre Marcel Dionne	Recap
No scoring		First period	No scoring
10:00 - Jérome Verrier (4)		Second period	Anthony Beauregard (2) - 1:50; Pierre-Maxime Poudrier (2) - pp - 5:12
15:52 - Ryan Culkin (2)		Third period	Anthony Beauregard (3) - 7:54
Louis-Philip Guindon (29 saves / 32 shots)		Goalie stats	Antoine Bibeau (24 saves / 26 shots)

Val-d'Or wins series 4 – 2

=== (4) Rimouski Océanic Vs. (5) Blainville-Boisbriand Armada ===
April 3	Rimouski Océanic	4 – 2	Blainville-Boisbriand Armada	Colisée de Rimouski	Recap
7:49 - pp - Frédérik Gauthier (2)		First period	No scoring
11:07 - pp - Alexis Loiseau (2); 19:16 - Michael Joly (5)		Second period	No scoring
19:51 - en - Michael Joly (6)		Third period	Philippe Sanche (2) - 2:03; Daniel Walcott (3) - pp - 5:15
Philippe Desrosiers (27 saves / 29 shots)		Goalie stats	Étienne Marcoux (19 saves / 22 shots)

April 4	Rimouski Océanic	3 – 0	Blainville-Boisbriand Armada	Colisée de Rimouski	Recap
5:46 - Anthony DeLuca (1); 6:12 - Patrik Zdráhal (1)		First period	No scoring
No scoring		Second period	No scoring
19:00 - sh - en - Michael Joly (7)		Third period	No scoring
Philippe Desrosiers (40 saves / 40 shots)		Goalie stats	Étienne Marcoux (23 saves / 25 shots)

April 8	Blainville-Boisbriand Armada	2 – 1	2OT	Rimouski Océanic	Centre d'Excellence Sports Rousseau	Recap
2:01 - pp - Christopher Clapperton (1)		First period		Frédérik Gauthier (3) - pp - 13:33
No scoring		Second period		No scoring
No scoring		Third period		No scoring
6:22 - Ņikita Jevpalovs (6)		Second overtime period		No scoring
Étienne Marcoux (38 saves / 39 shots)		Goalie stats		Philippe Desrosiers (43 saves / 45 shots)

April 9	Blainville-Boisbriand Armada	5 – 1	Rimouski Océanic	Centre d'Excellence Sports Rousseau	Recap
No scoring		First period	No scoring
5:32 - pp - Christopher Clapperton (2); 7:02 - Emil Aronsson (1); 11:53 - Marc-Olivier Roy (1)		Second period	No scoring
1:30 - pp - Daniel Walcott (4); 4:27 - Samuel Tremblay (3)		Third period	Jimmy Oligny (3) - pp - 3:29
Étienne Marcoux (30 saves / 31 shots)		Goalie stats	Philippe Desrosiers (20 saves / 25 shots); Olivier Tremblay (9 saves / 9 shots)

April 11	Blainville-Boisbriand Armada	3 – 4	OT	Rimouski Océanic	Centre d'Excellence Sports Rousseau	Recap
Danick Martel (6) - sh - 5:22; Danick Martel (7) - 12:18; Marc-Olivier Roy (2) - 16:18		First period		11:57 - Anthony DeLuca (2)
No scoring		Second period		0:50 - Michael Joly (8)
No scoring		Third period		0:46 - Sébastien Sylvestre (3)
No scoring		First overtime period		2:40 - Peter Trainor (2)
Étienne Marcoux (23 saves / 27 shots)		Goalie stats		Philippe Desrosiers (30 saves / 33 shots)

April 14	Rimouski Océanic	1 – 3	Blainville-Boisbriand Armada	Colisée de Rimouski	Recap
No scoring		First period	No scoring
No scoring		Second period	13:44 - Samuel Hodhod (1)
Peter Trainor (3) - pp - 12:26		Third period	1:38 - Samuel Hodhod (2); 8:21 - Samuel Tremblay (4)
Philippe Desrosiers (29 saves / 32 shots)		Goalie stats	Étienne Marcoux (25 saves / 26 shots)

April 15	Rimouski Océanic	7 – 8	OT	Blainville-Boisbriand Armada	Colisée de Rimouski	Recap
15:27 - William Couture (2); 17:32 - Peter Trainor (4); 18:23 - William Couture (3); 19:30 - Michael Joly (9)		First period		No scoring
3:49 - Peter Trainor (5)		Second period		Marc-Olivier Roy (3) - 1:05; Samuel Hodhod (3) - 2:02; Christopher Clapperton (3) - 4:27; Ryan Tesink (5) - pp - 11:05
12:20 - Tyler Boland (1); 16:14 - Sébastien Sylvestre (4)		Third period		Danick Martel (8) - 1:59; Ryan Tesink (6) - 6:35; Ņikita Jevpalovs (7) - 17:08
No scoring		First overtime period		Ņikita Jevpalovs (8) - 12:59
Philippe Desrosiers (19 saves / 25 shots); Olivier Tremblay (9 saves / 11 shots)		Goalie stats		Étienne Marcoux (7 saves / 11 shots); Sam Montembeault (14 saves / 17 shots)

Blainville-Boisbriand wins series 4 – 3

== Semi-finals ==
=== (1) Baie-Comeau Drakkar Vs. (5) Blainville-Boisbriand Armada ===
April 18	Baie-Comeau Drakkar	2 – 0	Blainville-Boisbriand Armada	Centre Henry-Leonard	Recap
No scoring		First period	No scoring
No scoring		Second period	No scoring
Robbie Graham (4) - 11:02; Francis Turbide (2) - en - 19:48		Third period	No scoring
Philippe Cadorette (21 saves / 21 shots)		Goalie stats	Étienne Marcoux (30 saves / 31 shots)

April 19	Baie-Comeau Drakkar	3 – 1	Blainville-Boisbriand Armada	Centre Henry-Leonard	Recap
2:07 - Charles Hudon (7); 4:10 - Dominic Poulin (1)		First period	Christopher Clapperton (4) - 0:41
No scoring		Second period	No scoring
18:55 - en - Valentin Zykov (3)		Third period	No scoring
Philippe Cadorette (23 saves / 24 shots)		Goalie stats	Étienne Marcoux (29 saves / 31 shots)

April 22	Blainville-Boisbriand Armada	4 – 1	Baie-Comeau Drakkar	Centre d'Excellence Sports Rousseau	Recap
8:49 - Antoine Dufort-Plante (1); 10:48 - Marc-Olivier Roy (4); 14:32 - Guillaume Beaudoin (1)		First period	Alexandre Ranger (5) - 9:21
No scoring		Second period	No scoring
13:50 - pp - Ņikita Jevpalovs (9)		Third period	No scoring
Étienne Marcoux (30 saves / 31 shots)		Goalie stats	Philippe Cadorette (24 saves / 28 shots)

April 23	Blainville-Boisbriand Armada	4 – 2	Baie-Comeau Drakkar	Centre d'Excellence Sports Rousseau	Recap
11:44 - Marcus Hinds (2)		First period	Alexandre Ranger (6) - 4:00
4:40 - Ņikita Jevpalovs (10); 12:03 - Philippe Sanche (3); 13:54 - Samuel Tremblay (5)		Second period	Denis Gorbunov (3) - pp - 5:12
No scoring		Third period	No scoring
Étienne Marcoux (28 saves / 30 shots)		Goalie stats	Philippe Cadorette (18 saves / 22 shots)

April 25	Baie-Comeau Drakkar	2 – 3	OT	Blainville-Boisbriand Armada	Centre Henry-Leonard	Recap
No scoring		First period		Samuel Hodhod (4) - pp - 17:11; Christopher Clapperton (5) - pp - 18:12
No scoring		Second period		Maxime St-Cyr (5) - pp - 11:33
9:48 - Denis Gorbunov (4)		Third period		No scoring
No scoring		First overtime period		Philippe Sanche (4) - 1:29
Philippe Cadorette (29 saves / 31 shots)		Goalie stats		Étienne Marcoux (19 saves / 22 shots)

April 27	Blainville-Boisbriand Armada	2 – 3	OT	Baie-Comeau Drakkar	Centre d'Excellence Sports Rousseau	Recap
No scoring		First period		No scoring
2:51 - Ryan Tesink (7)		Second period		No scoring
5:39 - Samuel Hodhod (5)		Third period		Maxime St-Cyr (6) - 10:13; Maxime St-Cyr (7) - 17:16
No scoring		First overtime period		Valentin Zykov (4) - 8:16
Étienne Marcoux (38 saves / 41 shots)		Goalie stats		Philippe Cadorette (22 saves / 24 shots)

April 29	Baie-Comeau Drakkar	2 – 1	Blainville-Boisbriand Armada	Centre Henry-Leonard	Recap
6:33 - sh - Alexandre Ranger (7); 12:46 - pp - Charles Hudon (8)		First period	No scoring
No scoring		Second period	Frédéric Bergeron (2) - 17:58
No scoring		Third period	No scoring
Philippe Cadorette (24 saves / 25 shots)		Goalie stats	Étienne Marcoux (16 saves / 18 shots)

Baie-Comeau wins series 4 – 3

=== (2) Halifax Mooseheads Vs. (3) Val-d'Or Foreurs ===
April 18	Halifax Mooseheads	2 – 5	Val-d'Or Foreurs	Halifax Metro Centre	Recap
6:02 - Nikolaj Ehlers (9)		First period	Anthony Beauregard (4) - 14:28; Nicolas Aubé-Kubel (4) - 17:38
No scoring		Second period	Samuel Henley (5) - 10:44
16:22 - Philippe Gadoury (9)		Third period	Louick Marcotte (7) - 3:48; Anthony Mantha (11) - en - 19:25
Zachary Fucale (18 saves / 22 shots)		Goalie stats	Antoine Bibeau (29 saves / 31 shots)

April 19	Halifax Mooseheads	2 – 4	Val-d'Or Foreurs	Halifax Metro Centre	Recap
9:31 - pp - Jonathan Drouin (10)		First period	Guillaume Gélinas (4) - 0:36; Louick Marcotte (8) - 6:48; Randy Gazzola (1) - 7:10
14:18 - Brendan Duke (1)		Second period	Samuel Henley (6) - pp - 18:42
No scoring		Third period	No scoring
Zachary Fucale (15 saves / 19 shots); Kevin Darveau (1 save / 1 shot)		Goalie stats	Antoine Bibeau (31 saves / 33 shots)

April 22	Val-d'Or Foreurs	5 – 6	OT	Halifax Mooseheads	Centre Air Creebec	Recap
0:45 - Anthony Mantha (12); 2:21 - Anthony Mantha (13); 3:28 - pp - Louick Marcotte (9)		First period		Andrew Shewfelt (4) - 4:10
9:03 - Phil Pietroniro (4); 5:16 - Anthony Mantha (14)		Second period		Matt Murphy (2) - sh - 15:31; Matt Murphy (3) - 16:29
No scoring		Third period		Jonathan Drouin (11) - 14:41; MacKenzie Weegar (5) - 16:01
No scoring		First overtime period		Jesse Lussier (1) - 8:24
Antoine Bibeau (34 saves / 40 shots)		Goalie stats		Zachary Fucale (1 save / 4 shots); Kevin Darveau (26 saves / 28 shots)

April 23	Val-d'Or Foreurs	4 – 5	Halifax Mooseheads	Centre Air Creebec	Recap
15:12 - Anthony Richard (5); 16:27 - pp - Samuel Henley (7)		First period	Andrew Ryan (3) - pp - 4:36; Philippe Gadoury (10) - 19:07
No scoring		Second period	Jonathan Drouin (12) - 2:57; Nikolaj Ehlers (10) - 5:17
4:35 - Anthony Mantha (15); 18:31 - Jérémie Fraser (1)		Third period	Jonathan Drouin (13) - 13:37
Antoine Bibeau (33 saves / 38 shots)		Goalie stats	Kevin Darveau (31 saves / 35 shots)

April 26	Halifax Mooseheads	4 – 3	OT	Val-d'Or Foreurs	Halifax Metro Centre	Recap
16:12 - Luca Ciampini (5)		First period		No scoring
0:25 - Andrew Ryan (4)		Second period		Anthony Mantha (16) - 3:49; Louick Marcotte (10) - pp - 9:06
12:05 - Austyn Hardie (1)		Third period		Anthony Mantha (17) - 1:52
12:34 - Maxime Fortier (1)		First overtime period		No scoring
Zachary Fucale (22 saves / 25 shots)		Goalie stats		Antoine Bibeau (38 saves / 42 shots)

April 28	Val-d'Or Foreurs	7 – 5	Halifax Mooseheads	Centre Air Creebec	Recap
3:59 - Anthony Richard (6); 6:58 - Anthony Beauregard (5); 8:53 - Anthony Beauregard (6); 11:27 - pp - Guillaume Gélinas (5)		First period	Luca Ciampini (6) - 12:32
15:49 - Anthony Richard (7)		Second period	No scoring
0:35 - pp - Guillaume Gélinas (6); 10:43 - Anthony Mantha (18)		Third period	Luca Ciampini (7) - sh - 0:57; Philippe Gadoury (11) - pp - 8:31; Brent Andrews (3) - 14:11; Andrew Shewfelt (5) - sh - 19:34
Antoine Bibeau (38 saves / 43 shots)		Goalie stats	Zachary Fucale (17 saves / 22 shots); Kevin Darveau (8 saves / 10 shots)

April 29	Halifax Mooseheads	2 – 3	Val-d'Or Foreurs	Halifax Metro Centre	Recap
7:06 - Philippe Gadoury (12); 12:37 - pp - Nikolaj Ehlers (11)		First period	Guillaume Gélinas (7) - 1:05
No scoring		Second period	Pierre-Maxime Poudrier (3) - 5:46; Maxime Presseault (1) - 13:59
No scoring		Third period	No scoring
Zachary Fucale (13 saves / 16 shots)		Goalie stats	Antoine Bibeau (39 saves / 41 shots)

Val-d'Or wins series 4 – 3

== Presidents Cup Finals ==
=== (1) Baie-Comeau Drakkar Vs. (3) Val-d'Or Foreurs ===
May 2	Baie-Comeau Drakkar	3 – 0	Val-d'Or Foreurs	Centre Henry-Leonard	Recap
12:23 - Charles Hudon (9)		First period	No scoring
No scoring		Second period	No scoring
7:27 - pp - Jérémy Grégoire (5); 18:46 - en - Charles Hudon (10)		Third period	No scoring
Philippe Cadorette (19 saves / 19 shots)		Goalie stats	Antoine Bibeau (32 saves / 34 shots)

May 3	Baie-Comeau Drakkar	3 – 4	OT	Val-d'Or Foreurs	Centre Henry-Leonard	Recap
2:25 - pp - Frédéric Gamelin (3)		First period		Louick Marcotte (11) - sh - 17:00
15:17 - pp - Alexandre Ranger (8); 16:08 - Dominic Poulin (2)		Second period		Guillaume Gélinas (8) - 10:54
No scoring		Third period		Pierre-Maxime Poudrier (4) - 18:27
No scoring		First overtime period		Guillaume Gélinas (9) - pp - 7:24
Philippe Cadorette (42 saves / 46 shots)		Goalie stats		Antoine Bibeau (32 saves / 35 shots)

May 6	Val-d'Or Foreurs	5 – 2	Baie-Comeau Drakkar	Centre Air Creebec	Recap
No scoring		First period	No scoring
4:49 - pp - Pierre-Maxime Poudrier (5); 16:42 - Maxime Gravel (1)		Second period	Félix Girard (2) - 14:49; Maxime St-Cyr (8) - 15:31
6:41 - Anthony Mantha (19); 16:57 - Anthony Mantha (20); 17:33 - en - Anthony Richard (8)		Third period	No scoring
Antoine Bibeau (30 saves / 32 shots)		Goalie stats	Philippe Cadorette (24 saves / 28 shots)

May 7	Val-d'Or Foreurs	3 – 4	OT	Baie-Comeau Drakkar	Centre Air Creebec	Recap
No scoring		First period		No scoring
10:28 - pp - Anthony Mantha (21)		Second period		Jérémy Grégoire (6) - 13:24
5:24 - Anthony Richard (9); 15:46 - sh - Anthony Mantha (22)		Third period		Denis Gorbunov (5) - pp - 10:24; Alexandre Ranger (9) - pp - 16:25
No scoring		First overtime period		Félix Girard (3) - 14:41
Antoine Bibeau (46 saves / 50 shots)		Goalie stats		Philippe Cadorette (39 saves / 42 shots)

May 9	Baie-Comeau Drakkar	6 – 5	Val-d'Or Foreurs	Centre Henry-Leonard	Recap
1:00 - Valentin Zykov (5); 11:48 - pp - Jérémy Grégoire (7); 15:59 - Charles Poulin (1)		First period	Shawn Ouellette-St-Amant (2) - 8:56; Phil Pietroniro (5) - 12:17
7:56 - Jérémy Grégoire (8)		Second period	Anthony Mantha (23) - 2:21
5:13 - pp - Maxime St-Cyr (9); 7:05 - Valentin Zykov (6)		Third period	Guillaume Gélinas (10) - 6:41; Randy Gazzola (2) - pp - 12:27
Philippe Cadorette (26 saves / 31 shots)		Goalie stats	Antoine Bibeau (42 saves / 48 shots)

May 11	Val-d'Or Foreurs	6 – 3	Baie-Comeau Drakkar	Centre Air Creebec	Recap
10:41 - Pierre-Maxime Poudrier (6)		First period	No scoring
1:36 - Anthony Richard (10)		Second period	Alec Jon Banville (2) - 5:04; Valentin Zykov (7) - 19:51
8:26 - Guillaume Gélinas (11); 11:21 - Randy Gazzola (3); 15:21 - Ryan Graves (1); 19:04 - en - Pierre-Maxime Poudrier (7)		Third period	Alexandre Ranger (10) - 11:53
Antoine Bibeau (43 saves / 46 shots)		Goalie stats	Philippe Cadorette (31 saves / 36 shots)

May 13	Baie-Comeau Drakkar	3 – 4	Val-d'Or Foreurs	Centre Henry-Leonard	Recap
No scoring		First period	Samuel Henley (8) - 8:57
No scoring		Second period	Louick Marcotte (12) - 1:39; Randy Gazzola (4) - 13:08
9:41 - Gabryel Paquin-Boudreau (2); 16:07 - Félix Girard (4); 18:01 - Jérémy Grégoire (9)		Third period	Anthony Mantha (24) - 19:08
Philippe Cadorette (18 saves / 22 shots)		Goalie stats	Antoine Bibeau (40 saves / 43 shots)

Val-d'or wins series 4–3

== Playoff scoring leaders ==
Note: GP = Games played; G = Goals; A = Assists; Pts = Points; PIM = Penalty minutes

Player	Team	GP	G	A	Pts	PIM
Jonathan Drouin	Halifax Mooseheads	16	13	28	41	18
Anthony Mantha	Val-d'Or Foreurs	24	24	14	38	52
Louick Marcotte	Val-d'Or Foreurs	24	12	25	37	12
Guillaume Gélinas	Val-d'Or Foreurs	24	11	23	34	20
Nikolaj Ehlers	Halifax Mooseheads	16	11	17	28	18
Samuel Henley	Val-d'Or Foreurs	24	8	20	28	25
Philippe Gadoury	Halifax Mooseheads	16	12	13	25	4
Randy Gazzola	Val-d'Or Foreurs	24	4	20	24	2
Jérémy Grégoire	Baie-Comeau Drakkar	22	9	14	23	35
Valentin Zykov	Baie-Comeau Drakkar	22	7	15	22	14
MacKenzie Weegar	Halifax Mooseheads	16	5	17	22	14

== Playoff leading goaltenders ==
Note: GP = Games played; Mins = Minutes played; W = Wins; L = Losses: OTL = Overtime losses; SL = Shootout losses; GA = Goals Allowed; SO = Shutouts; GAA = Goals against average

Player	Team	GP	Mins	W	L	GA	SO	Sv%	GAA
Philippe Cadorette	Baie-Comeau Drakkar	22	1344	15	7	51	3	0.914	2.28
Étienne Marcoux	Blainville-Boisbriand Armada	20	1207	10	9	46	0	0.915	2.29
Philippe Desrosiers	Rimouski Océanic	11	640	7	3	25	2	0.917	2.34
Zachary Fucale	Halifax Mooseheads	15	796	9	4	37	0	0.882	2.79
Antoine Bibeau	Val-d'Or Foreurs	24	1476	16	8	69	1	0.913	2.80

== Trophies and awards ==
Team

- President's Cup – Playoff Champions: Val-d'Or Foreurs
- Jean Rougeau Trophy – Regular Season Champions: Baie-Comeau Drakkar
- Luc Robitaille Trophy – Team that scored the most goals: Val-d'Or Foreurs
- Robert Lebel Trophy – Team with best GAA: Baie-Comeau Drakkar

Player

- Michel Brière Memorial Trophy – Most Valuable Player: Anthony Mantha, Val-d'Or Foreurs
- Jean Béliveau Trophy – Top Scorer: Anthony Mantha, Val-d'Or Foreurs
- Guy Lafleur Trophy – Playoff MVP: Antoine Bibeau, Val-d'Or Foreurs
- Jacques Plante Memorial Trophy – Top Goaltender: Zachary Fucale, Halifax Mooseheads
- Guy Carbonneau Trophy – Best Defensive Forward: Félix Girard, Baie-Comeau Drakkar
- Emile Bouchard Trophy – Defenceman of the Year: Guillaume Gélinas, Val-d'Or Foreurs
- Kevin Lowe Trophy – Best Defensive Defenceman: Justin Hache, Cape Breton Screaming Eagles
- Mike Bossy Trophy – Top Prospect: Nikolaj Ehlers, Halifax Mooseheads
- RDS Cup – Rookie of the Year: Nikolaj Ehlers, Halifax Mooseheads
- Michel Bergeron Trophy – Offensive Rookie of the Year: Nikolaj Ehlers, Halifax Mooseheads
- Raymond Lagacé Trophy – Defensive Rookie of the Year: Jérémy Roy, Sherbrooke Phoenix
- Frank J. Selke Memorial Trophy – Most sportsmanlike player: Frédérick Gaudreau, Drummondville Voltigeurs/Shawinigan Cataractes
- QMJHL Humanitarian of the Year – Humanitarian of the Year: Charles-David Beaudoin, Drummondville Voltigeurs
- Marcel Robert Trophy – Best Scholastic Player: Jérémy Grégoire, Baie-Comeau Drakkar
- Paul Dumont Trophy – Personality of the Year: Zachary Fucale, Halifax Mooseheads

Executive

- Ron Lapointe Trophy – Coach of the Year: Éric Veilleux, Baie-Comeau Drakkar
- Maurice Filion Trophy – General Manager of the Year: Steve Ahern, Baie-Comeau Drakkar
- John Horman Trophy – Executive of the Year: Serge Proulx, Baie-Comeau Drakkar
- Jean Sawyer Trophy – Marketing Director of the Year: Sherbrooke Phoenix

=== All-Star teams ===
First All-Star Team:

- Philippe Cadorette, Goaltender, Baie-Comeau Drakkar
- Guillaume Gélinas, Defenceman, Val-d'Or Foreurs
- Randy Gazzola, Defenceman, Val-d'Or Foreurs
- Jonathan Drouin, Centre, Halifax Mooseheads
- Anthony Duclair, Left Wing, Quebec Remparts
- Anthony Mantha, Right Wing, Val-d'Or Foreurs

Second All-Star Team:

- Zachary Fucale, Goaltender, Halifax Mooseheads
- Justin Hache, Defenceman, Cape Breton Screaming Eagles
- MacKenzie Weegar, Defenceman, Halifax Mooseheads
- Cameron Darcy, Centre, Cape Breton Screaming Eagles
- Nikolaj Ehlers, Left Wing, Halifax Mooseheads
- Marcus Power, Right Wing, Rouyn-Noranda Huskies

All-Rookie Team:

- Callum Booth, Goaltender, Quebec Remparts
- Jérémy Roy, Defenceman, Sherbrooke Phoenix
- Nicolas Meloche, Defenceman, Baie-Comeau Drakkar
- Alexandre Goulet, Centre, Charlottetown Islanders
- Nikolaj Ehlers, Left Wing, Halifax Mooseheads
- Daniel Sprong, Right Wing, Charlottetown Islanders

== See also ==
- List of QMJHL seasons
- 2013 in ice hockey
- 2013–14 OHL season
- 2013–14 WHL season
- 2014 in ice hockey
- 2014 Memorial Cup

Preceded by 2012–13 QMJHL season	QMJHL seasons	Succeeded by 2014–15 QMJHL season
