= Jimmy Oligny =

Canadian ice hockey player

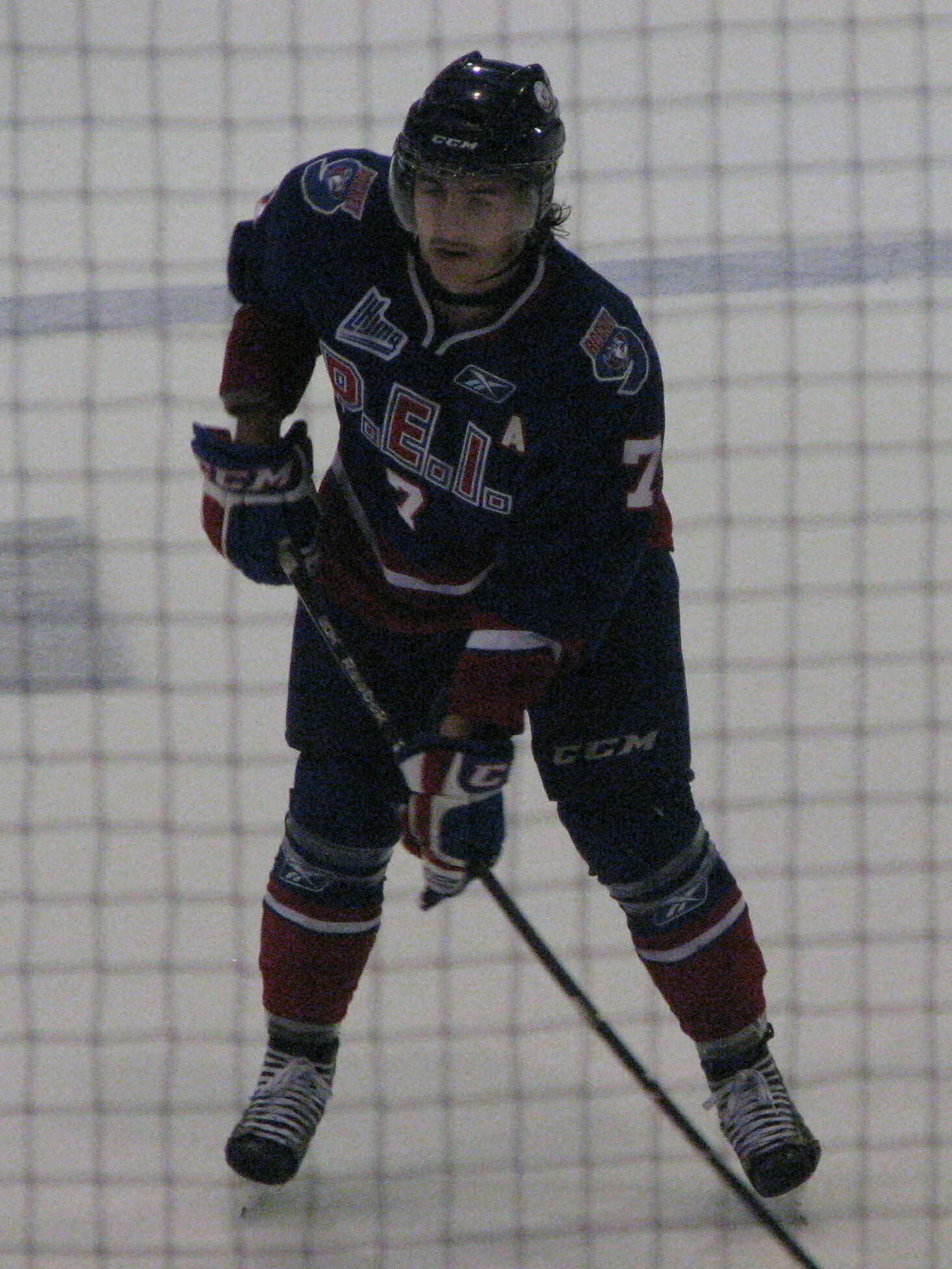
- Oligny with the P.E.I. Rocket in 2012
- Born: April 30, 1993 (age 33) Saint-Michel, Quebec
- Height: 5 ft 10 in (178 cm)
- Weight: 196 lb (89 kg; 14 st 0 lb)
- Position: Defence
- Shoots: Left
- EIHL team Former teams: Cardiff Devils; Milwaukee Admirals; Chicago Wolves; Manitoba Moose; HKM Zvolen; Graz 99ers
- NHL draft: Undrafted
- Playing career: 2014–present

Jimmy Oligny (born April 30, 1993) is a Canadian professional ice hockey defenceman who is currently under contract with Cardiff Devils in the UK's Elite Ice Hockey League (EIHL). Oligny was most recently with Graz 99ers and before that with HKM Zvolen in the Slovak Extraliga (Slovak). He previously served as the captain of the Manitoba Moose of the American Hockey League (AHL).

== Playing career ==
Oligny was drafted seventh overall by the Prince Edward Island Rocket in the 2009 QMJHL Draft.

After his third season with the Prince Edward Island Rocket, Oligny was traded to the Rimouski Océanic in exchange for a first-round pick and a fourth-round pick in the 2014 QMJHL Draft. While playing for the Océanic, Oligny was nominated for the Kevin-Lowe Trophy as the league's best defensive defenseman.

After playing one season with the Rimouski Océanic for the 2013–14 season, Oligny turned professional by signing with the Milwaukee Admirals of the American Hockey League (AHL).

Oligny was named the Admirals Man Of The Year at the conclusion of the 2015–16 season. The following season, Oligny re-signed a two-year American Hockey League contract with the Milwaukee Admirals.

As a free agent in 2018, Oligny signed his first NHL contract, agreeing to terms with the Vegas Golden Knights on a one-year, entry-level deal and joined their AHL affiliate team, the Chicago Wolves, to begin the 2018–19 season. Oligny was placed on the third defensive pairing for the Wolves, posting 1 assist in 16 games before he was dealt by the Golden Knights to the Winnipeg Jets in exchange for future considerations on January 3, 2019. He was immediately reassigned to AHL affiliate, the Manitoba Moose.

On June 25, 2019, Oligny was not tendered a qualifying offer from the Jets, releasing him as a free agent. After exploring his options, Oligny opted to remain within the Jets organization, signing a one-year AHL contract extension with the Moose on July 3, 2019.

Following his sixth season with the Manitoba Moose, Oligny left the AHL as free agent and secured his first contract abroad in agreeing to a one-year deal with Slovakian club, HKM Zvolen of the Slovak Extraliga, on September 13, 2024.

Oligny ended the 2024-25 campaign in Austria with ICE Hockey League side Graz 99ers. Ahead of the 2025-26 season, Oligny agreed terms to join the Cardiff Devils in the UK's Elite Ice Hockey League (EIHL).

On April 19 2026, Jimmy Oligny won the EIHL playoffs with a 5-2 win over the Sheffield Steelers and was named as a Second Team All-star. Then on May 6, it was announced he would remain with the Cardiff Devils until the end of the 2027/28 season.

== Career statistics ==
=== Regular season and playoffs ===
			Regular season					Playoffs
Season	Team	League	GP	G	A	Pts	PIM	GP	G	A	Pts	PIM
2008–09	Coll. Charles-Lemoy. Riverains	QMAAA	45	3	7	10	46	16	1	5	6	34
2009–10	P.E.I. Rocket	QMJHL	52	1	5	6	28	5	1	0	1	2
2010–11	P.E.I. Rocket	QMJHL	66	2	13	15	77	5	0	0	0	10
2011–12	P.E.I. Rocket	QMJHL	58	6	18	24	165	—	—	—	—	—
2012–13	P.E.I. Rocket	QMJHL	65	13	29	42	142	6	1	1	2	4
2013–14	Rimouski Océanic	QMJHL	61	7	29	36	119	10	3	5	8	25
2014–15	Milwaukee Admirals	AHL	53	1	4	5	46	—	—	—	—	—
2015–16	Milwaukee Admirals	AHL	74	3	11	14	120	3	0	0	0	2
2015–16	Cincinnati Cyclones	ECHL	1	0	0	0	6	—	—	—	—	—
2016–17	Milwaukee Admirals	AHL	66	1	11	12	118	—	—	—	—	—
2017–18	Milwaukee Admirals	AHL	66	2	10	12	135	—	—	—	—	—
2018–19	Chicago Wolves	AHL	16	0	1	1	28	—	—	—	—	—
2018–19	Manitoba Moose	AHL	32	2	8	10	35	—	—	—	—	—
2019–20	Manitoba Moose	AHL	53	4	12	16	83	—	—	—	—	—
2020–21	Manitoba Moose	AHL	21	0	3	3	27	—	—	—	—	—
2021–22	Manitoba Moose	AHL	67	4	13	17	91	5	0	3	3	2
2022–23	Manitoba Moose	AHL	17	0	3	3	30	4	0	0	0	2
2023–24	Manitoba Moose	AHL	8	0	1	1	11	—	—	—	—	—
2024–25	HKM Zvolen	Slovakia	14	0	4	4	4	—	—	—	—	—
2024–25	Graz99ers	ICEHL	23	2	6	8	13	7	0	1	1	7
2025–26	Cardiff Devils	EIHL	64	7	25	32	112	4	0	0	0	4
2026–27	Cardiff Devils	EIHL	—	—	—	—	—	—	—	—	—	—
2027–28	Cardiff Devils	EIHL	—	—	—	—	—	—	—	—	—	—
AHL totals			473	17	77	94	724	12	0	3	3	6

=== International ===
Year	Team	Event	Result	GP	G	A	Pts	PIM
2010	Canada Quebec	U17	6th	4	0	0	0	6
Junior totals				4	0	0	0	6
