= Émile Poirier =

Canadian ice hockey player (born 1994)

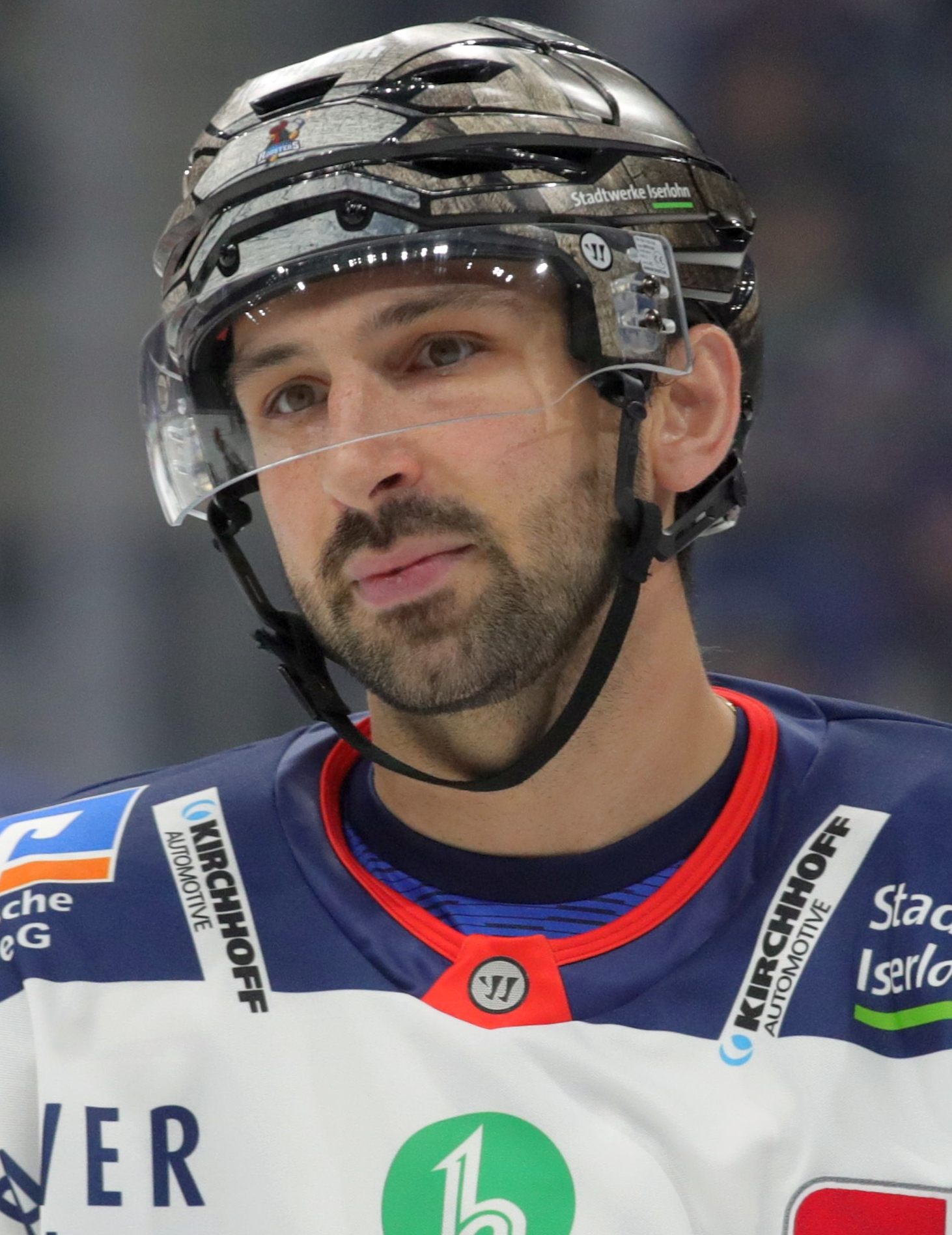
- Poirier with the Iserlohn Roosters in 2022
- Born: December 14, 1994 (age 31) Montreal, Quebec, Canada
- Height: 6 ft 2 in (188 cm)
- Weight: 200 lb (91 kg; 14 st 4 lb)
- Position: Right wing
- Shoots: Left
- team Former teams: Free agent Stockton Heat; Calgary Flames; Manitoba Moose; HC Košice; Dinamo Riga; Djurgårdens IF; Iserlohn Roosters; HC Slovan Bratislava
- NHL draft: 22nd overall, 2013; Calgary Flames
- Playing career: 2014–present

Émile Poirier (born December 14, 1994) is a Canadian professional ice hockey forward. He is currently a free agent. He was selected by the Calgary Flames in the first round, 22nd overall, at the 2013 NHL entry draft.

== Playing career ==
A native of Montreal, Poirier began his junior hockey career with the Gatineau Olympiques of the Quebec Major Junior Hockey League (QMJHL) in 2011–12. He appeared in 67 games, scoring 15 goals and 40 points. Previously unheralded, Poirier improved to 70 points in 65 games in 2012–13; he was the team's scoring leader, 16 points ahead of his nearest teammate. He established himself as a top-40 prospect for the 2013 NHL entry draft. The NHL Central Scouting Bureau placed him 39th in their final pre-draft list, and Poirier moved higher in the projections with a standout performance in the playoffs; he had ten points in ten playoff games, including six "highlight reel" goals.

Capable of playing at either the wing or at centre, Poirier is a fast skater, though he says his style is "not pretty". Describing his playing style, Poirier stated: "I love to play hard. I compete, got to the net hard and fight a little bit, too. I want to bring energy." He was invited to attend summer camp for the Canadian national junior team ahead of the 2014 World Junior Ice Hockey Championships. At the draft, Poirier was selected in the first round by the Calgary Flames, 22nd overall.

Returning to Gatineau, Poirier had his best season as a junior in 2013–14. He set career highs and led his team with 43 goals, 44 assists and 87 points to go along with a plus-minus rating of +30. He also signed an entry-level contract with the Flames, and joined Calgary's American Hockey League (AHL) affiliate, the Abbotsford Heat on an amateur try-out agreement after Gatineau was eliminated from the QMJHL playoffs. Poirier scored a goal in his first professional game, then added another to go with two assists in his second as the Heat prepared for the AHL playoffs. Following the season, the Flames announced that Poirier had played the year with a bad shoulder that required surgery.

Poirier missed the first month of the 2014–15 season while recovering. He was assigned to the AHL's Adirondack Flames when healthy and scored twice in his first game. The 20-year-old forward scored 30 points in his first 42 games with Adirondack and was the youngest player in the AHL All-Star Game. He was recalled to Calgary on February 23, 2015, and made his NHL debut the following night in a 1–0 loss to the New York Rangers. Poirier recorded his first NHL point with an assist on a goal by Mikael Backlund on March 3, 2015, against the Philadelphia Flyers.

After his fourth full season within the Flames organization, Poirier was released as a free agent when he was not tendered a qualifying offer as a restricted free agent. Un-signed over the summer, Poirier without an NHL deal, accepted a professional try-out contract to begin the 2018–19 season, with the Manitoba Moose, affiliate to the Winnipeg Jets, on October 4, 2018. Poirier was limited to just 24 games through injury, registering 8 points.

As a free agent following a full season with the Moose, Poirier was unable to secure a contract over the summer. Returning to attend the Manitoba Moose training camp, Poirier was signed to a professional tryout contract to begin the 2019–20 season on October 4th, 2019.

After spending his first season abroad with the Slovakian club, HC Košice of the Slovak Extraliga, Poirier continued his career by moving to Latvian-based club, Dinamo Riga of the Kontinental Hockey League (KHL), on a one-year deal on June 3, 2021. In the following 2021–22 season, Poirier made 39 regular season appearances with Dinamo, registering 9 goals and 18 points before leaving the club to close out the season with Swedish club, Djurgårdens IF of the Swedish Hockey League (SHL), on February 16, 2022. He added 3 goals and 5 points through 11 games, however, was unable to prevent Djurgårdens IF from relegation to the Allsvenska.

On July 19, 2022, Poirier returned to North America after signing as a free agent to a one-year AHL contract with his hometown club, the Laval Rocket. After attending training camp, Poirier was unable to make the Rocket season-opening roster and was reassigned to ECHL affiliate, the Trois-Rivières Lions, before later opting to terminate his contract before the commencement of the 2022–23 season on October 20, 2022.

On October 27, 2022, Poirier resumed his European career by signing a one-year contract with the German club, Iserlohn Roosters of the Deutsche Eishockey Liga (DEL). In 2022–23 season, Poirier recorded 14 goals and 26 points in 40 regular season games. With Iserlohn missing the playoffs for the second consecutive season, Poirier left the club after his contract on March 10, 2023.

== Career statistics ==
			Regular season					Playoffs
Season	Team	League	GP	G	A	Pts	PIM	GP	G	A	Pts	PIM
2011–12	Gatineau Olympiques	QMJHL	67	15	25	40	53	4	1	0	1	8
2012–13	Gatineau Olympiques	QMJHL	65	32	38	70	101	10	6	4	10	14
2013–14	Gatineau Olympiques	QMJHL	63	43	44	87	129	9	7	3	10	26
2013–14	Abbotsford Heat	AHL	2	2	2	4	0	3	1	0	1	2
2014–15	Adirondack Flames	AHL	55	19	23	42	50	—	—	—	—	—
2014–15	Calgary Flames	NHL	6	0	1	1	0	—	—	—	—	—
2015–16	Stockton Heat	AHL	60	12	17	29	51	—	—	—	—	—
2015–16	Calgary Flames	NHL	2	0	0	0	2	—	—	—	—	—
2016–17	Stockton Heat	AHL	43	6	11	17	64	—	—	—	—	—
2017–18	Stockton Heat	AHL	65	7	24	31	35	—	—	—	—	—
2018–19	Manitoba Moose	AHL	24	3	5	8	17	—	—	—	—	—
2019–20	Manitoba Moose	AHL	50	6	8	14	48	—	—	—	—	—
2020–21	HC Košice	Slovak	18	9	8	17	14	4	1	2	3	4
2021–22	Dinamo Riga	KHL	39	9	9	18	46	—	—	—	—	—
2021–22	Djurgårdens IF	SHL	11	3	2	5	13	—	—	—	—	—
2022–23	Iserlohn Roosters	DEL	40	14	12	26	48	—	—	—	—	—
NHL totals			8	0	1	1	2	—	—	—	—	—
KHL totals			39	9	9	18	46	—	—	—	—	—

Awards and achievements
Preceded by Sean Monahan	Calgary Flames' first-round draft pick 2013	Succeeded by Morgan Klimchuk
