= Daniel Walcott =

Canadian ice hockey player (born 1994)

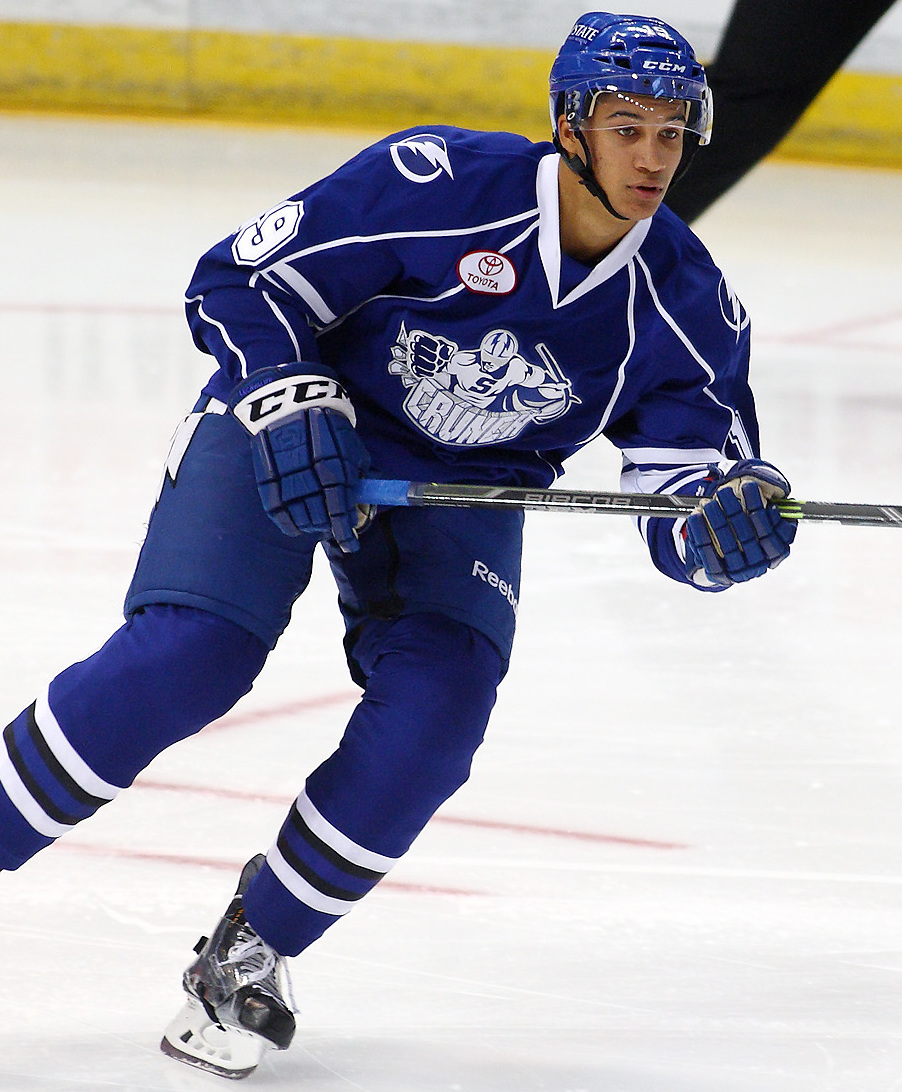
- Walcott with the Syracuse Crunch in 2015
- Born: February 19, 1994 (age 32) L'Île-Perrot, Quebec, Canada
- Height: 5 ft 11 in (180 cm)
- Weight: 175 lb (79 kg; 12 st 7 lb)
- Position: Defence
- Shot: Left
- Played for: Tampa Bay Lightning
- NHL draft: 140th overall, 2014; New York Rangers
- Playing career: 2015–2026

Daniel Walcott (born February 19, 1994) is a Canadian former professional ice hockey player. Walcott was selected by the New York Rangers in the fifth round (140th overall) of the 2014 NHL entry draft, and played in one NHL game with the Tampa Bay Lightning in 2021.

== Playing career ==
After graduating from New Trier High School in Northfield, Illinois, Walcott committed to playing Division I club hockey, a level far below NCAA Division I, in the American Collegiate Hockey Association at Lindenwood University in the 2012–13 season. Walcott would return to Quebec to play major junior hockey a season later in the Quebec Major Junior Hockey League during the 2014–15 QMJHL season, while playing with the Blainville-Boisbriand Armada, Walcott was rewarded for his outstanding play when he was named to the QMJHL First All-Star Team.

On June 1, 2015, Walcott was traded from the New York Rangers to the Tampa Bay Lightning in exchange for a seventh-round draft pick in the 2015 NHL entry draft, which was initially sent to Tampa Bay in the Martin St. Louis trade the previous season. Walcott had just finished his second season in Quebec Major Junior Hockey League with the Blainville-Boisbriand Armada. Walcott had seven goals and 41 points in 54 regular season games. He additionally appeared in one American Hockey League game with the Hartford Wolf Pack after signing an amateur tryout agreement.

On September 17, 2015, Walcott signed a three-year entry-level contract with the Lightning.

During the 2017–18 season while playing with the Syracuse Crunch, the Lightning's AHL affiliate, he was the team's nominee for the IOA/American Specialty AHL Man of the Year.

On June 7, 2018, Walcott renewed his contract with the Lightning, signing a one-year, two-way deal. Before the 2018–19 season, Walcott was injured with the Lightning in the pre-season forcing him to miss the majority of the year. He missed 71 games with an injured shoulder before returning to play 5 games with the Crunch in the AHL.

On June 19, 2019, Walcott was re-signed to a one-year, two-way extension to remain within the Lightning organization. On December 20, 2019, while playing for the Crunch, he was given a two-game suspension for abusive language towards an opponent.

For the 2019–20 season, Walcott was the Crunch's nominee for the IOA/American Specialty AHL Man of the Year for the third time in his career.

On April 17, 2020, Walcott was re-signed to a one-year, two-way extension with the Lightning.

On March 9, 2021, Walcott was re-signed to a two-year, two-way extension with the Lightning. On April 6, Walcott earned his first NHL recall with the Lightning, being assigned to the Lightning's taxi squad. On May 10, Walcott made his NHL debut with the Lightning in a game against the Florida Panthers.

On December 16, 2022, Walcott set the record for most games played with the Syracuse Crunch, with 335 career games played with the Crunch, surpassing Brad Moran.Walcott would play a total of 494 regular season games with the Crunch, from 2015 to 2025, before signing a professional try-out with the Hartford Wolf Pack during the 2025–26 season.

== Career statistics ==
| | | | Regular season | | | | | Playoffs |
| Season | Team | League | GP | G | A | Pts | PIM | GP | G | A | Pts | PIM |
|---|---|---|---|---|---|---|---|---|---|---|---|---|
| 2012–13 | Lindenwood University | ACHA | 33 | 4 | 9 | 13 | 30 | — | — | — | — | — |
| 2013–14 | Blainville-Boisbriand Armada | QMJHL | 67 | 10 | 29 | 39 | 71 | 19 | 4 | 6 | 10 | 18 |
| 2014–15 | Blainville-Boisbriand Armada | QMJHL | 54 | 7 | 34 | 41 | 40 | 6 | 1 | 3 | 4 | 4 |
| 2014–15 | Hartford Wolf Pack | AHL | 1 | 0 | 0 | 0 | 0 | — | — | — | — | — |
| 2015–16 | Greenville Swamp Rabbits | ECHL | 3 | 0 | 0 | 0 | 10 | — | — | — | — | — |
| 2015–16 | Syracuse Crunch | AHL | 62 | 2 | 11 | 13 | 54 | — | — | — | — | — |
| 2016–17 | Syracuse Crunch | AHL | 55 | 4 | 11 | 15 | 68 | 13 | 0 | 4 | 4 | 12 |
| 2017–18 | Syracuse Crunch | AHL | 62 | 5 | 11 | 16 | 70 | 7 | 0 | 1 | 1 | 10 |
| 2018–19 | Syracuse Crunch | AHL | 5 | 0 | 0 | 0 | 10 | — | — | — | — | — |
| 2019–20 | Syracuse Crunch | AHL | 55 | 7 | 12 | 19 | 86 | — | — | — | — | — |
| 2020–21 | Syracuse Crunch | AHL | 9 | 1 | 2 | 3 | 12 | — | — | — | — | — |
| 2020–21 | Tampa Bay Lightning | NHL | 1 | 0 | 0 | 0 | 5 | — | — | — | — | — |
| 2021–22 | Syracuse Crunch | AHL | 63 | 6 | 7 | 13 | 79 | 5 | 1 | 0 | 1 | 4 |
| 2022–23 | Syracuse Crunch | AHL | 67 | 13 | 19 | 32 | 103 | 5 | 0 | 0 | 0 | 8 |
| 2023–24 | Syracuse Crunch | AHL | 55 | 14 | 10 | 24 | 66 | 8 | 1 | 2 | 3 | 10 |
| 2024–25 | Syracuse Crunch | AHL | 61 | 4 | 8 | 12 | 20 | 3 | 0 | 0 | 0 | 0 |
| 2025–26 | Hartford Wolf Pack | AHL | 39 | 4 | 4 | 8 | 51 | — | — | — | — | — |
| NHL totals | | | 1 | 0 | 0 | 0 | 5 | — | — | — | — | — |

== Awards and honours ==
| Award | Year | Ref |
QMJHL
| First Team All-Star | 2014–15 | |
AHL
| Yanick Dupre Memorial Award | 2023–24 | |
