= Randy Gazzola =

Canadian ice hockey player (born 1993)

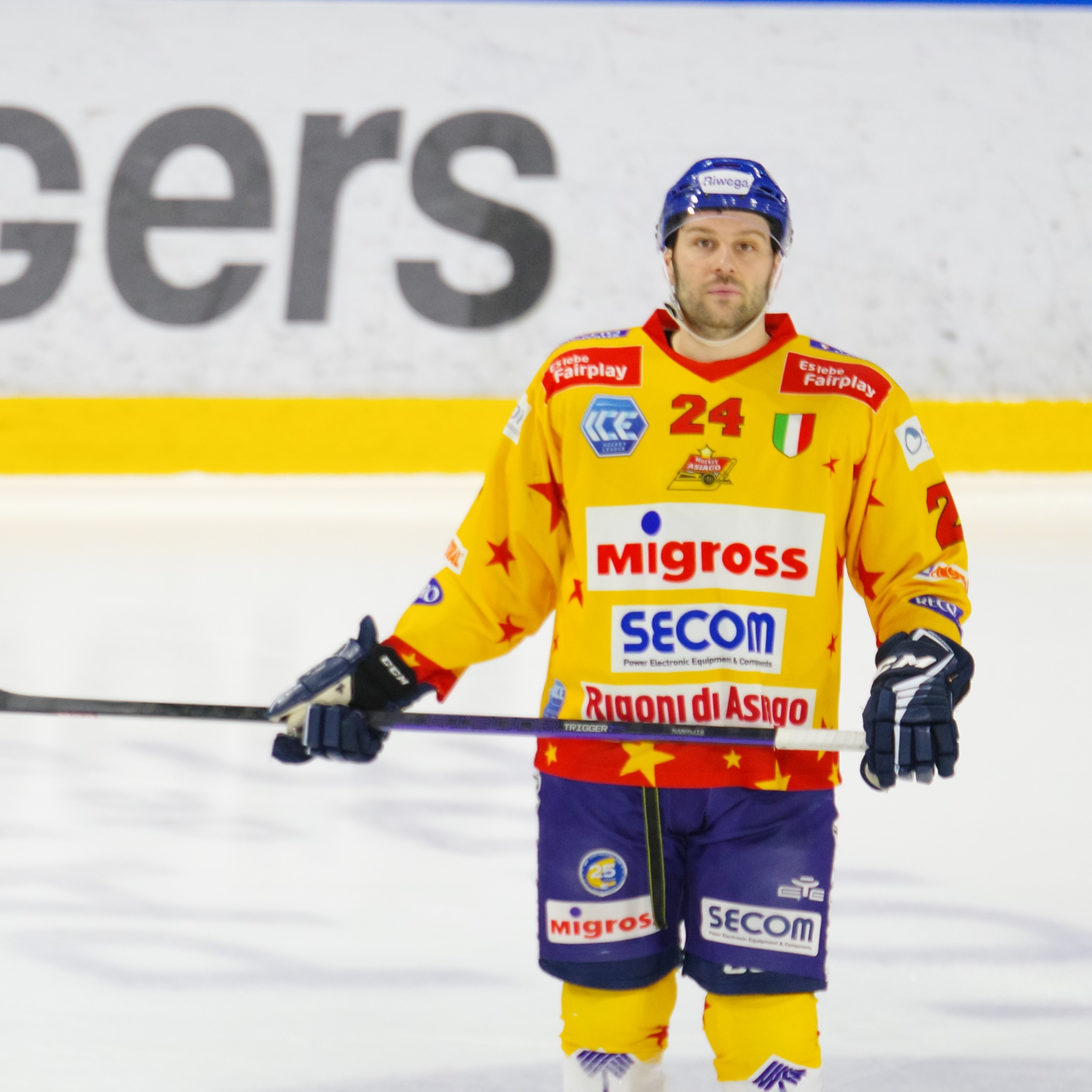
- Gazzola with Asiago Hockey 1935 in 2023
- Born: September 13, 1993 (age 32) Thorold, Ontario, Canada
- Height: 6 ft 3 in (191 cm)
- Weight: 201 lb (91 kg; 14 st 5 lb)
- Position: Defence
- Shoots: Right
- ICEHL team Former teams: HC Asiago; Ritten-Renon; Grand Rapids Griffins
- National team: Italy
- NHL draft: Undrafted
- Playing career: 2019–present

Medal record

Ice hockey

Representing Canada East

World Junior A Challenge
Silver medal – second place	2011 Langley	

Randal John Gazzola (born September 13, 1993) is an Italian-Canadian professional ice hockey defenceman. He is currently playing for the HC Asiago in the ICE Hockey League. He previously played amateur for the UNB Varsity Reds of the AUS and at the junior level with the Val-d'Or Foreurs of the Quebec Major Junior Hockey League (QMJHL).

== Playing career ==
Gazzola played in the QMJHL for 3 seasons 2012–13 to 2013–14, was rewarded for his outstanding play when he was named to the 2013–14 QMJHL First All-Star Team.

After his junior career, Randy went on to play CIS university hockey at the University of New Brunswick Varsity Reds. Randy made an immediate impact at UNB, being selected as the conference Rookie of the Year as well as being selected to the CIS All-Rookie team. He helped UNB to the 2015 University Cup final before losing to defending champion Alberta Golden Bears 6-3. Randy won a CIS national title (University Cup) with UNB the next season, March 2016, when they defeated their AUS rivals St. Francis Xavier X-Men 3-1 in the Championship final.

On January 13, 2021, Gazzola joined his second ECHL club, agreeing to a contract for the 2020–21 season with the Fort Wayne Komets.

== Awards and honours ==
Award	Year
QMJHL
First Team All-Star	2013–14
College
AUS Rookie of the Year	2014–15
AUS All-Rookie Team	2014–15
CIS All-Rookie Team	2014–15
ECHL
Kelly Cup (Fort Wayne Komets)	2021
