= Guillaume Gélinas =

Canadian ice hockey player

Guillaume Gelinas
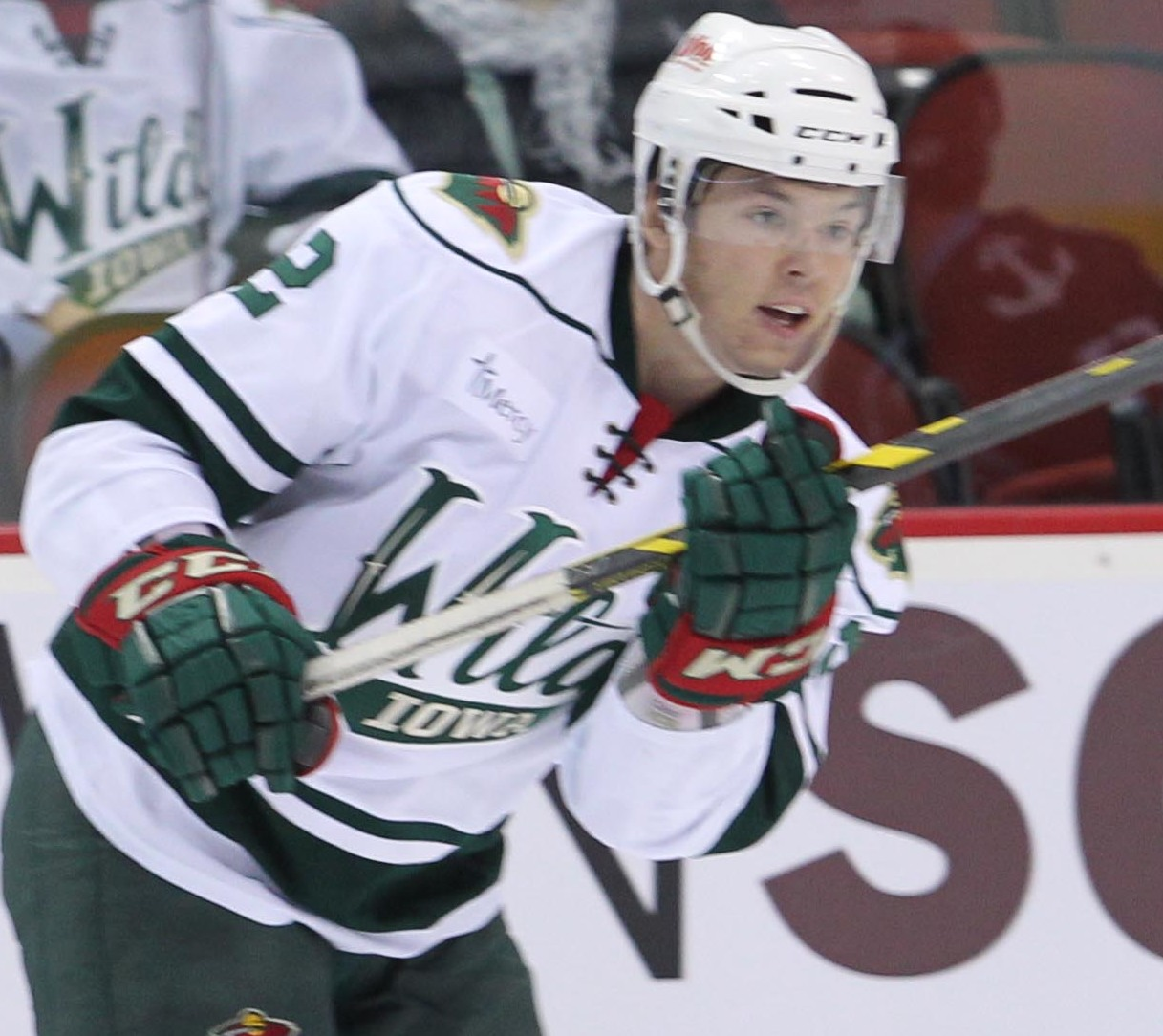
- Gélinas with the Iowa Wild in 2014
- Born: June 14, 1993 (age 33) Quebec City, Quebec, Canada
- Height: 5 ft 10 in (178 cm)
- Weight: 203 lb (92 kg; 14 st 7 lb)
- Position: Defence
- Shot: Left
- Played for: Iowa Wild; HC ’05 Banská Bystrica; Belfast Giants
- NHL draft: Undrafted
- Playing career: 2014–2019

Guillaume Gélinas (born June 14, 1993) is a retired Canadian professional ice hockey defenceman. He last played for UK Elite Ice Hockey League (EIHL) side Belfast Giants in Northern Ireland.

== Playing career ==
Gelinas played junior hockey for the Val-d'Or Foreurs of the Quebec Major Junior Hockey League from the 2009–10 season. He received the Emile Bouchard Trophy as the league's best defenceman during the 2013–14 QMJHL season but was not selected in the NHL draft.

On July 1, 2014, Gelinas signed a three-year entry-level contract with the Minnesota Wild.

At the conclusion of his entry-level deal with the Wild, after primarily spending the final 2016–17 season with secondary ECHL affiliate, the Quad City Mallards, Gelinas was not to be tendered a new contract with the Wild. As a free agent, Gelinas signed a one-year deal with the Slovak club HC' 05 Banská Bystrica on May 18, 2017.

== Awards and honours ==
Award	Year
Emile Bouchard Trophy - QMJHL Defenceman of the Year	2013–14
