= Cameron Darcy =

American ice hockey player

- Born: March 2, 1994 (age 32) South Boston, Massachusetts, U.S.
- Height: 6 ft 0 in (183 cm)
- Weight: 185 lb (84 kg; 13 st 3 lb)
- Position: Center
- Shot: Right
- Played for: Syracuse Crunch; Utica Comets; San Antonio Rampage; Binghamton Devils
- NHL draft: 185th overall, 2014; Tampa Bay Lightning
- Playing career: 2015–2024

Cameron Darcy (born March 2, 1994) is an American former professional ice hockey forward. He last played for the Florida Everblades in the ECHL. He was selected in the seventh round, 185th overall, by the Tampa Bay Lightning in the 2014 NHL entry draft.

== Playing career ==
=== Amateur ===
As a Massachusetts native, Darcy first played high school hockey with Dexter School in Brookline, Massachusetts, from 2007 to 2010. Amongst the School's leading scorers he was recruited to join the USA Hockey National Team Development Program, playing two seasons within the USNTDP system and the United States Hockey League (USHL).

Darcy committed to play collegiate hockey with Northeastern University, joining the Huskies as a freshman in the 2012–13 season. He made just 9 appearances with Northeastern before withdrawing from the Northeastern program and returning to the USHL with the Muskegon Lumberjacks on November 14, 2012. In 43 games with the Lumberjacks, Darcy contributed with 12 goals and 31 points.

=== Junior ===
Having previously been drafted in the 2011 QMJHL Entry Draft by the Cape Breton Screaming Eagles, Darcy opted to pursue a major junior career signing a contract with the QMJHL club on August 6, 2013. As an alternate captain in his debut season with Cape Breton in 2013–14, Darcy led the team in scoring with 35 goals and 82 points in 65 games, earning a selection to the QMJHL Second All-Star Team.

He was selected by the Tampa Bay Lightning with their last selection in the seventh-round, 185th overall, of the 2014 NHL entry draft. He returned to the Screaming Eagles for the 2014–15 season, notching 14 points through 19 games before he was traded to the Sherbrooke Phoenix on December 11, 2014. In his final season in the QMJHL, Darcy posted 45 points in 37 regular season games, before adding 9 points in 6 playoff games in a first-round exit with the Phoenix.

=== Professional ===
On April 9, 2015, Darcy was signed by the Lightning to a three-year, entry-level contract. In his first professional year, Darcy was assigned to the Lightning's AHL affiliate, the Syracuse Crunch, to begin the 2015–16 season. In 56 appearances with the Crunch, Darcy was unable to translate his offensive game from junior, posting just 4 goals and 12 points in a depth role.

In the following 2016–17 season, Darcy was limited to just 34 games with the Crunch before he was reassigned to split the season with secondary affiliate, the Kalamazoo Wings of the ECHL. He contributed with over a point-per-game pace with the Wings, collecting 25 points through 20 regular season games.

Before commencing the final season of his entry-level deal with the Tampa Bay Lightning, having been unable to make an impression within the organization, Darcy was placed on unconditional waivers and had his contract terminated on September 19, 2017. As a free agent he agreed to a professional tryout contract with the Utica Comets of the AHL, affiliate to the Vancouver Canucks, leading into the 2017–18 season. Establishing a role within the Comets, Darcy was signed to an AHL contract for the remainder of the season on November 29, 2017. He recorded career highs with 18 assists and 24 points in 46 games with the Comets leading to a one-year contract extension on June 19, 2018.

In the following 2018–19 season, Darcy solidified his place in the AHL, appearing 68 games with the Comets with a career best 10 goals.

As a free agent from the Comets, Darcy continued his career in the AHL in agreeing to a one-year contract with the San Antonio Rampage, the primary affiliate of the St. Louis Blues on July 1, 2019. In the 2019–20 season, Darcy contributed with 18 points through 45 games before the remainder of the season was cancelled due to the COVID-19 pandemic.

With the Rampage ceasing operations, Darcy as a free agent signed a one-year contract with his fourth AHL club, the Binghamton Devils, on January 12, 2021.

After a years hiatus, Darcy returned to the professional circuit for the 2022–23 season, signing a contract with the Florida Everblades of the ECHL on August 19, 2022.

== International play ==
Medal record

Representing United States

Ice hockey

U18 World Championships
Gold medal – first place	2012 Finland	

Darcy was first selected at an international tournament for the United States at the 2011 World U-17 Hockey Challenge, scoring 2 assists in five contests in a silver medal finish. He then competed for the United States in his first full IIHF competition at the 2012 IIHF World U18 Championships, going scoreless in 6 games while claiming the gold medal.

== Career statistics ==
=== Regular season and playoffs ===
			Regular season					Playoffs
Season	Team	League	GP	G	A	Pts	PIM	GP	G	A	Pts	PIM
2007–08	Dexter School	USHS	16	3	6	9	4	—	—	—	—	—
2008–09	Dexter School	USHS	26	16	16	32	8	—	—	—	—	—
2009–10	Dexter School	USHS	27	21	25	46	13	—	—	—	—	—
2010–11	U.S. National Development Team	USHL	37	9	4	13	20	2	0	0	0	2
2011–12	U.S. National Development Team	USHL	24	4	2	6	8	—	—	—	—	—
2012–13	Northeastern University	HE	9	0	2	2	8	—	—	—	—	—
2012–13	Muskegon Lumberjacks	USHL	45	12	19	31	40	3	1	0	1	4
2013–14	Cape Breton Screaming Eagles	QMJHL	65	35	47	82	51	4	1	2	3	2
2014–15	Cape Breton Screaming Eagles	QMJHL	19	1	13	14	14	—	—	—	—	—
2014–15	Sherbrooke Phoenix	QMJHL	37	20	25	45	34	6	5	4	9	8
2015–16	Syracuse Crunch	AHL	56	4	8	12	44	—	—	—	—	—
2016–17	Syracuse Crunch	AHL	34	3	4	7	14	—	—	—	—	—
2016–17	Kalamazoo Wings	ECHL	20	5	20	25	10	7	3	7	10	2
2017–18	Utica Comets	AHL	46	6	18	24	54	5	1	2	3	10
2018–19	Utica Comets	AHL	68	10	13	23	49	—	—	—	—	—
2019–20	San Antonio Rampage	AHL	45	4	14	18	22	—	—	—	—	—
2020–21	Binghamton Devils	AHL	14	0	2	2	4	—	—	—	—	—
2022–23	Florida Everblades	ECHL	60	11	23	34	22	22	1	4	5	20
2023–24	Florida Everblades	ECHL	31	1	10	11	30	11	2	2	4	8
AHL totals			263	27	59	86	187	5	1	2	3	10

=== International ===
Year	Team	Event	Result	GP	G	A	Pts	PIM
2011	United States	U17	2nd place, silver medalist(s)	5	0	2	2	2
2012	United States	U18	1st place, gold medalist(s)	6	0	0	0	0
Junior totals				11	0	2	2	2

== Awards and honors ==
Award	Year
USHL
USHL/NHL Top Prospects Game	2013
QMJHL
Second All-Star Team	2014
