= Samuel Henley (ice hockey) =

Canadian ice hockey player

- Born: 25 July 1993 (age 33) Val-d'Or, Quebec, Canada
- Height: 6 ft 4 in (193 cm)
- Weight: 209 lb (95 kg; 14 st 13 lb)
- Position: Left wing
- Shot: Left
- Played for: Colorado Avalanche
- NHL draft: Undrafted
- Playing career: 2014–2017

Samuel Henley (born 25 July 1993) is a Canadian former professional ice hockey forward. He played as a prospect for the Colorado Avalanche of the National Hockey League (NHL).

== Playing career ==
As a youth, Henley played in the 2006 Quebec International Pee-Wee Hockey Tournament with the Val d'Or Foreurs minor ice hockey team.

=== Junior ===
Henley first played midget hockey within Quebec QMAAA with the Amos Forestiers, appearing in 13 games with 5 points before he was selected by the Lewiston MAINEiacs in the third-round, 39th overall, in the QMJHL Entry Draft. He played his first junior ice hockey campaign in the 2009–10 season, collected 4 goals in 63 games as a depth forward. After two seasons with Lewiston, Henley was selected in the dispersal draft of the Maineiacs to play with his hometown team, the Val d'Or Foreurs, joining brother and Buffalo Sabres 2010 draft pick, Cedrick Henley.

In his first season in Val d'Or in 2011–12, Henley matched his previous seasons' total of 13 goals for 27 points in 63 games. Added to the leadership group in his second year with the Foreurs, Henley adjusted his role from a depth player to a two-way force with 45 points in 58 games. Prior to his final junior season, Henley attended the Washington Capitals training camp before returning to be selected as the Captain of the Foreurs for the 2013–14 season. He broke out offensively with 30 goals and 69 points in just 51 games, leading the Val d'Or Foreurs to claim their third President's Cup in franchise history and earning a place at the 2014 Memorial Cup.

=== Professional ===
Henley was promptly signed as an undrafted free agent to a three-year entry-level contract with the Colorado Avalanche on 29 May 2014. After attending his first training camp with the Avalanche, Henley was reassigned to begin his professional career in the 2014–15 season, with the Lake Erie Monsters of the AHL. As the Monsters' primarily fourth-line center and penalty-killer, he contributed with 6 goals and 10 points in 54 games. Henley solidified his reputation for his defensive and shutdown capabilities in the following season, improving his points totals with 8 goals and 15 points in 74 games for the Avalanche's new AHL affiliate, the San Antonio Rampage.

In the final year of his entry-level contract, Henley began the 2016–17 season, with the Rampage. On 1 December 2016, with the Avalanche depleted through injury, Henley received his first recall to the NHL. He made his debut with the Avalanche that night from the Avalanche's fourth-line and became the first player since Stefan Elliott in 2011 to score in his Avalanche debut, contributing a tying goal against Sergei Bobrovsky in an eventual 3–2 defeat to the Columbus Blue Jackets. He was later returned to the Rampage without adding to his solitary game. Having returned to the Rampage, Henley played out the season as an Alternate captain but was unable to match his previous season totals in contributing with just 3 goals and 9 points in 55 games.

On 26 June 2017, Henley as a restricted free agent, was not tendered a qualifying contract by the Colorado Avalanche, thus releasing him to free agency. Despite multiple contract offers over the summer, Henley opted to take a one-year sabbatical from professional hockey.

== Career statistics ==
=== Regular season and playoffs ===
			Regular season					Playoffs
Season	Team	League	GP	G	A	Pts	PIM	GP	G	A	Pts	PIM
2008–09	Amos Forestiers	QMAAA	13	1	4	5	2	6	1	2	3	0
2009–10	Lewiston MAINEiacs	QMJHL	63	4	9	13	22	4	0	1	1	2
2010–11	Lewiston MAINEiacs	QMJHL	64	13	18	31	37	15	0	2	2	4
2011–12	Val-d'Or Foreurs	QMJHL	63	13	14	27	71	4	1	2	3	9
2012–13	Val-d'Or Foreurs	QMJHL	58	22	23	45	59	10	1	2	3	6
2013–14	Val-d'Or Foreurs	QMJHL	51	30	39	69	42	24	8	20	28	25
2014–15	Lake Erie Monsters	AHL	56	6	4	10	47	—	—	—	—	—
2015–16	San Antonio Rampage	AHL	74	8	7	15	51	—	—	—	—	—
2016–17	San Antonio Rampage	AHL	55	3	6	9	39	—	—	—	—	—
2016–17	Colorado Avalanche	NHL	1	1	0	1	2	—	—	—	—	—
NHL totals			1	1	0	1	2	—	—	—	—	—

=== International ===
Year	Team	Event	Result	GP	G	A	Pts	PIM
2010	Canada Quebec	U17	6th	5	1	0	1	14
Junior totals				5	1	0	1	14
