= Cégep de Shawinigan =

Public college in Shawinigan, Quebec

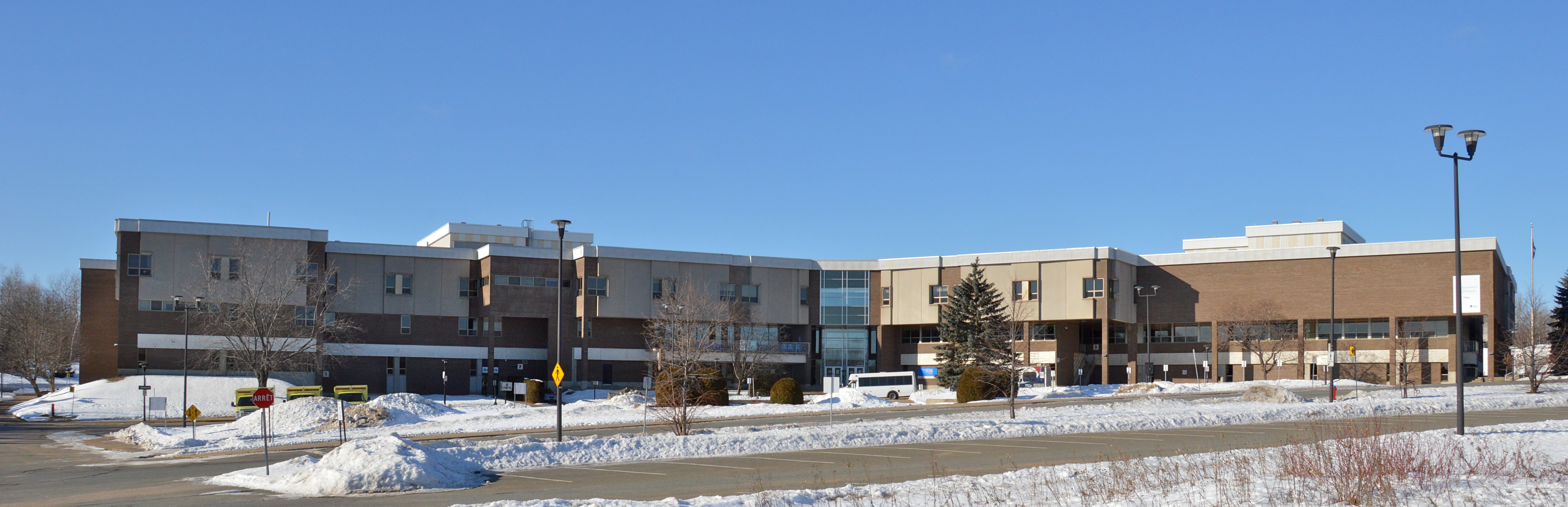
- Former names: Collège Shawinigan
- Motto: Du savoir et des gens
- Type: Public CEGEP
- Established: 1968
- Students: 1200
- Location: Shawinigan, Quebec, Canada; 46°34′N 72°45′W
- Website: cegepshawinigan.ca

Cégep de Shawinigan is a public college located in Shawinigan, Quebec, Canada.

Originally known as the Cégep de Shawinigan at its founding in 1968, it was renamed to Collège Shawinigan in 1994 before returning to its original name in 2019. In addition to the main campus in Shawinigan, there is a campus in La Tuque (CEC La Tuque).

== Student life ==
The college has competitive teams in sports (Les Électriks), Esports and improvisation (Les Fourches, Le Trident).

== See also ==
- Education in Quebec

== Elevators ==
La Cie F.-X. Drolet (Ascenseurs Drolet Inc.)

Concord Elevator Inc.
