= Pierre-Olivier Joseph =

Canadian ice hockey player (born 1999)

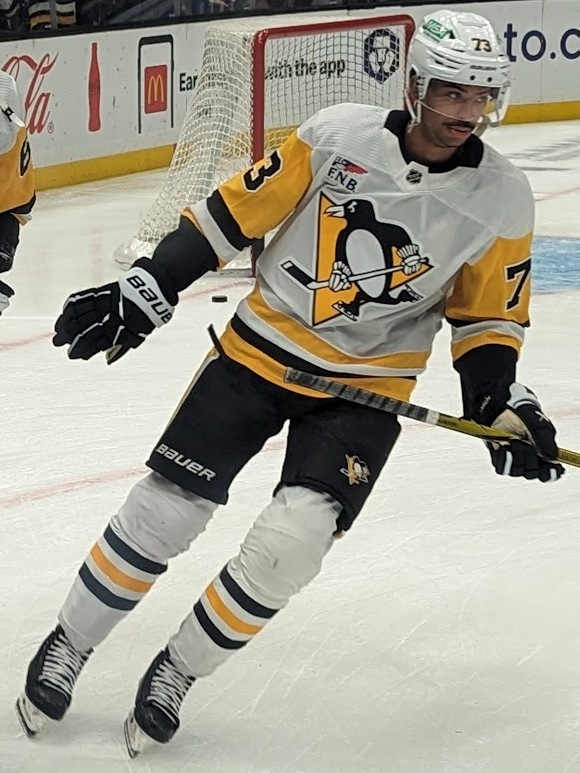
- Joseph with the Pittsburgh Penguins in 2023
- Born: July 1, 1999 (age 27) Laval, Quebec, Canada
- Height: 6 ft 2 in (188 cm)
- Weight: 185 lb (84 kg; 13 st 3 lb)
- Position: Defence
- Shoots: Left
- NHL team (P) Cur. team Former teams: Carolina Hurricanes; Chicago Wolves (AHL); Pittsburgh Penguins; St. Louis Blues; Vancouver Canucks
- National team: Canada
- NHL draft: 23rd overall, 2017; Arizona Coyotes
- Playing career: 2019–present

Pierre-Olivier Joseph (born July 1, 1999) is a Haitian-Canadian professional ice hockey player who is a defenceman currently playing for the Chicago Wolves in the American Hockey League (AHL) while under contract to the Carolina Hurricanes of the National Hockey League (NHL). He was drafted 23rd overall by the Arizona Coyotes in the 2017 NHL entry draft.

== Early life ==
Joseph was born on July 1, 1999, in Laval, Quebec, Canada to parents Frantzi Joseph and France Taillon. His father played and coached hockey for many years and France was a competitive athlete in her youth. His father is of Haitian descent and his mother is white. Growing up, he was called racial slurs on the ice and told to go back to his "own country." His older brother Mathieu currently plays for the Edmonton Oilers, they were previously teammates in St. Louis.

== Playing career ==
=== Amateur ===
Joseph was drafted 78th overall in the 2015 Quebec Major Junior Hockey League (QMJHL) entry draft by the Charlottetown Islanders. After attending their training camp, he was re-assigned to Collège Antoine-Girouard Gaulois in the Ligue de Hockey Midget AAA du Québec but was recalled full time by early November. Joseph concluded his rookie season with eight points in 48 games and received a ‘B’ ranking from the NHL Central Scouting Bureau's October ‘Players to Watch’ list prior to the 2016–17 season.

Joseph returned to the Islanders for his sophomore season as an assistant captain and set new career highs in goals, assists, and points. He began the season with three goals and seven assists and improved offensively from there, ending with 39 points in 33 games. At the end of the season, he was named the Islanders' finalist for the Marcel Robert Trophy and was a finalist for the Michael Bossy Trophy. Joseph helped the Islanders qualify for the 2017 QMJHL playoffs and recorded six points in 13 games before they were eliminated. As a result of his major junior play, Joseph was drafted 23rd overall at the 2017 NHL entry draft by the Arizona Coyotes and signed a three-year NHL entry-level contract. After being drafted by the Coyotes, Joseph spent the 2017–18 season bulking up to add weight and muscle to his 160-plus-pound frame. He lived with the teams' nutritionist for the year and weighed in at Coyotes 2018 development camp at 168 pounds.

After being returned to the QMJHL, Joseph was traded to the Drummondville Voltigeurs in December. At the time of the trade, he had recorded 18 assists for 25 points in 27 games and was named captain of Team QMJHL at the 2018 CIBC Canada-Russia Series.

=== Professional ===
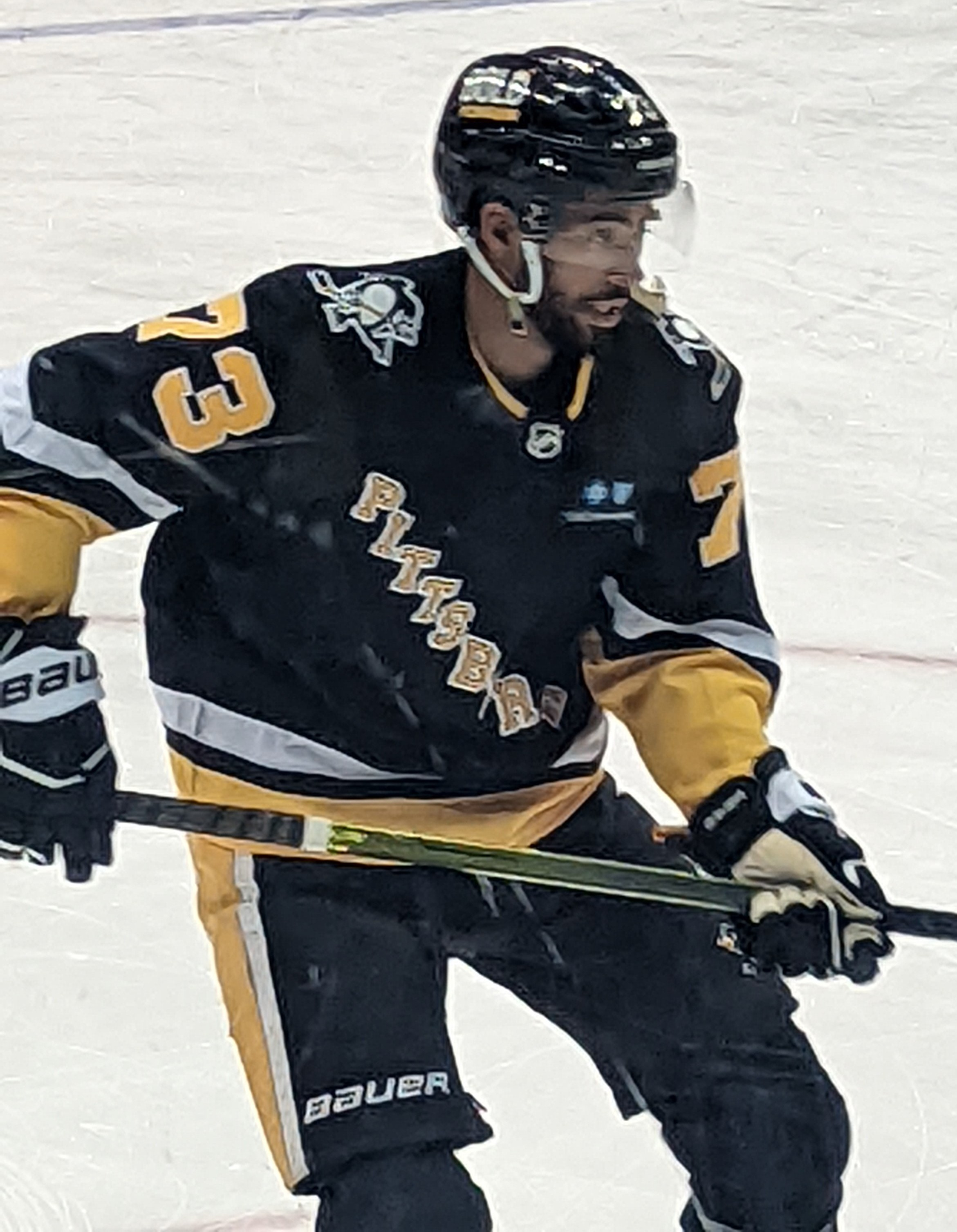
Joseph playing with the Pittsburgh Penguins in 2023.

On June 29, 2019, Joseph was traded by the Coyotes, along with Alex Galchenyuk, to the Pittsburgh Penguins in exchange for Phil Kessel, Dane Birks, and a fourth-round pick in the 2021 NHL entry draft. He continued to work on his weight during the 2019 off-season and gained 10 pounds before entering his first professional season with the Wilkes-Barre/Scranton Penguins in the American Hockey League (AHL). As a result of his training, which included working with his brother and trainer in Tampa Bay, Joseph went from 165 pounds to 175 pounds before training camp. However, six games into his rookie season, he suffered a bout of mononucleosis and missed over a month to recover. Upon returning to the Penguins' lineup, he recorded two points in 11 games despite losing the 10 pounds he gained over the offseason. In response to his weight, coach Mike Vellucci said: "the organization has ways of measuring a player's actual strength in different areas."

As the 2019–20 season continued, Joseph was given numerous responsibilities as his teammates were called up to the NHL level. In his final 32 games, he had 14 points and a plus-8 rating. Prior to the pause of the season due to COVID-19, Joseph played on the Penguins' top defensive pairing with Jon Lizotte and averaged well over 20 minutes a game.

Joseph made his NHL debut on January 22, 2021, against the New York Rangers due to injuries across the Penguins lineup. Prior to his debut, Penguins coach Mike Sullivan spoke highly of him as a player, saying: "P-O's a good player....He's stronger. He's faster. He's a good two-way defenseman. He has good offensive instincts. He has the ability to join the rush, can make an outlet pass and sees the ice well. And because of his mobility and his reach, I think he has the ability to be a good defender. ... We know he can play at this level, and he deserves a lot of credit for how far his game has come." Within his first seven games with the Penguins, he recorded five points including his first career NHL goal against Semyon Varlamov of the New York Islanders.

Following five seasons within the Penguins organization, Joseph was not tendered a qualifying offer by the club and was released as a free agent. On July 2, 2024, Joseph was signed to a one-year, $950,000 contract with the St. Louis Blues, joining his brother Mathieu, who was also newly acquired by the Blues. However, he was traded back to Pittsburgh on December 18, 2024, for future considerations.

As a free agent for a second consecutive season, Joseph signed a one-year, $775,000 contract with the Vancouver Canucks on July 2, 2025.

== International play ==
Medal record

Representing Canada

Ice hockey

World Championships
Gold medal – first place	2023 Finland/Latvia	

On May 5, 2023, he was named to Canada men's national ice hockey team at the 2023 IIHF World Championship where he recorded one goal in ten games and won a gold medal.

== Career statistics ==
=== Regular season and playoffs ===
			Regular season					Playoffs
Season	Team	League	GP	G	A	Pts	PIM	GP	G	A	Pts	PIM
2014–15	Collège Antoine-Girouard Gaulois	QMAAA	42	3	8	11	18	—	—	—	—	—
2015–16	Collège Antoine-Girouard Gaulois	QMAAA	19	1	9	10	12	—	—	—	—	—
2015–16	Charlottetown Islanders	QMJHL	48	1	7	8	30	12	1	2	3	6
2016–17	Charlottetown Islanders	QMJHL	62	6	33	39	54	13	1	5	6	12
2017–18	Charlottetown Islanders	QMJHL	63	13	33	46	59	18	1	11	12	24
2018–19	Charlottetown Islanders	QMJHL	27	7	18	25	36	—	—	—	—	—
2018–19	Drummondville Voltigeurs	QMJHL	35	2	20	22	26	16	2	7	9	8
2019–20	Wilkes-Barre/Scranton Penguins	AHL	52	3	14	17	32	—	—	—	—	—
2020–21	Pittsburgh Penguins	NHL	16	1	4	5	6	—	—	—	—	—
2020–21	Wilkes-Barre/Scranton Penguins	AHL	23	1	12	13	28	—	—	—	—	—
2021–22	Wilkes-Barre/Scranton Penguins	AHL	61	10	23	33	44	6	1	4	5	6
2021–22	Pittsburgh Penguins	NHL	4	0	0	0	2	—	—	—	—	—
2022–23	Pittsburgh Penguins	NHL	75	5	16	21	44	—	—	—	—	—
2023–24	Pittsburgh Penguins	NHL	52	2	9	11	14	—	—	—	—	—
2023–24	Wilkes-Barre/Scranton Penguins	AHL	2	0	1	1	0	—	—	—	—	—
2024–25	St. Louis Blues	NHL	23	0	2	2	23	—	—	—	—	—
2024–25	Pittsburgh Penguins	NHL	24	0	1	1	22	—	—	—	—	—
2025–26	Vancouver Canucks	NHL	31	1	5	6	8	—	—	—	—	—
NHL totals			225	9	37	46	119	—	—	—	—	—

=== International ===
Year	Team	Event	Result	GP	G	A	Pts	PIM
2023	Canada	WC	1st place, gold medalist(s)	10	1	0	1	2
Senior totals				10	1	0	1	2

Awards and achievements
Preceded by Jakob Chychrun	Arizona Coyotes first-round draft pick 2017	Succeeded by Barrett Hayton
