= Raphaël Lavoie =

Canadian ice hockey player (born 2000)

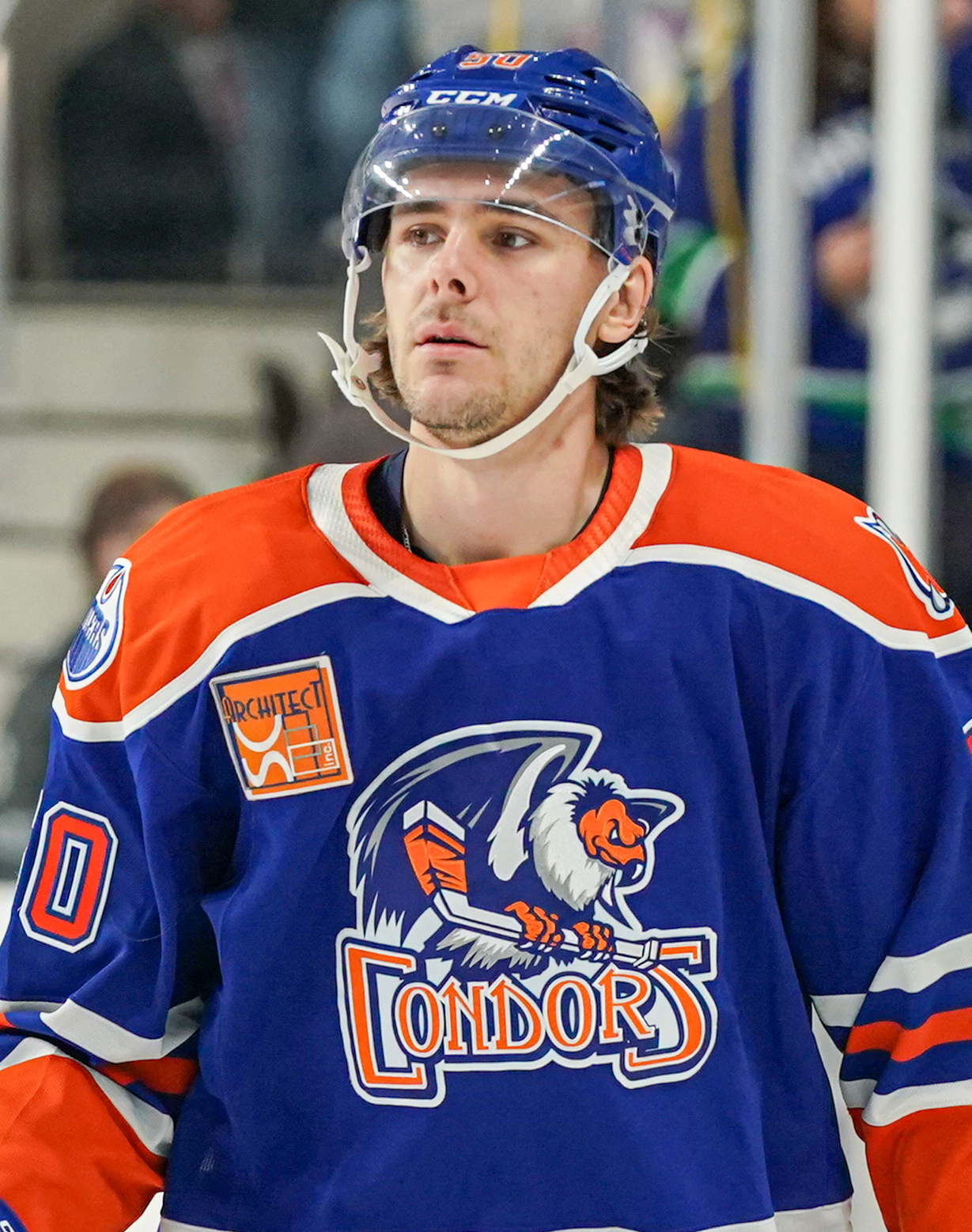
- Lavoie with the Bakersfield Condors in 2024
- Born: September 25, 2000 (age 26) Chambly, Quebec, Canada
- Height: 6 ft 4 in (193 cm)
- Weight: 217 lb (98 kg; 15 st 7 lb)
- Position: Centre
- Shoots: Right
- NHL team Former teams: Vegas Golden Knights; Edmonton Oilers
- NHL draft: 38th overall, 2019; Edmonton Oilers
- Playing career: 2020–present

Raphaël Lavoie (/ˈlævˈwɑː/ la-VWAH; born September 25, 2000) is a Canadian professional ice hockey player for the Vegas Golden Knights of the National Hockey League (NHL). He was drafted 38th overall in the second round of the 2019 NHL entry draft by the Edmonton Oilers, for whom he made his NHL debut in 2023.

== Playing career ==
=== Amateur ===
Lavoie played junior hockey with the Halifax Mooseheads and Chicoutimi Saguenéens of the Quebec Major Junior Hockey League (QMJHL) between 2016 and 2020. He was a second-round draft pick of the Edmonton Oilers in the 2019 NHL entry draft.

=== Professional ===
On March 20, 2020, the Oilers announced they had signed Lavoie to a three-year entry-level contract. Lavoie would take part of the Oilers preseason training camp the following September and on September 22, he was assigned to Väsby IK of the HockeyAllsvenskan. On March 27, 2021, following the conclusion of Väsby's season, Lavoie and fellow Oilers prospect, Philip Kemp, were both assigned to the Bakersfield Condors of the American Hockey League (AHL).

After playing three seasons with the Bakersfield Condors of the American Hockey League (AHL), Lavoie played his first National Hockey League (NHL) game on November 4, 2023, in a 5–2 loss to the Nashville Predators.

Ahead of the 2024–25 season, Lavoie was claimed off waivers by the Vegas Golden Knights on October 7, 2024. The following day, Lavoie was placed on waivers by Vegas, and was subsequently re-claimed by Edmonton on October 9. However, Edmonton waived Lavoie again a day later; Vegas then re-claimed him on October 11, assigning him to the AHL Henderson Silver Knights shortly afterwards. Lavoie debuted for Vegas on January 28, 2025, playing eight and a half minutes in a 4–3 overtime loss to the Dallas Stars.

As a restricted free agent, Lavoie signed a one-year extension with Vegas on July 6, 2025. Entering unrestricted free agency the following offseason, Lavoie signed a further one-year extension with Vegas on July 1, 2026. Lavoie recorded his first career point on October 12, 2026, contributing the secondary assist on a second-period Rasmus Andersson goal in Vegas' 4–2 loss to the Minnesota Wild. Two weeks later, on October 27, Lavoie scored his first NHL goal against Jonas Johansson of the Ottawa Senators, putting Vegas ahead 2–1 in what would ultimately be a 4–1 victory.

== Career statistics ==
=== Regular season and playoffs ===
			Regular season					Playoffs
Season	Team	League	GP	G	A	Pts	PIM	GP	G	A	Pts	PIM
2015–16	Collège Antoine-Girouard Gaulois	QMAAA	42	12	14	26	16	8	2	3	5	19
2016–17	Collège Antoine-Girouard Gaulois	QMAAA	15	7	11	18	28	—	—	—	—	—
2016–17	Halifax Mooseheads	QMJHL	32	6	3	9	26	6	1	1	2	6
2017–18	Halifax Mooseheads	QMJHL	68	30	33	63	43	9	3	2	5	5
2018–19	Halifax Mooseheads	QMJHL	62	32	41	73	31	23	20	12	32	22
2019–20	Halifax Mooseheads	QMJHL	30	18	26	44	36	—	—	—	—	—
2019–20	Chicoutimi Saguenéens	QMJHL	25	20	18	38	12	—	—	—	—	—
2020–21	Väsby IK	Allsv	51	23	22	45	80	—	—	—	—	—
2020–21	Bakersfield Condors	AHL	19	5	5	10	16	6	1	3	4	2
2021–22	Bakersfield Condors	AHL	56	13	13	26	14	—	—	—	—	—
2022–23	Bakersfield Condors	AHL	61	25	20	45	47	2	1	0	1	0
2023–24	Bakersfield Condors	AHL	66	28	22	50	64	2	0	1	1	4
2023–24	Edmonton Oilers	NHL	7	0	0	0	2	—	—	—	—	—
2024–25	Henderson Silver Knights	AHL	42	17	10	27	39	—	—	—	—	—
2024–25	Vegas Golden Knights	NHL	9	0	0	0	2	—	—	—	—	—
2025–26	Henderson Silver Knights	AHL	45	30	26	56	12	6	3	0	3	2
2025–26	Vegas Golden Knights	NHL	1	0	0	0	0	—	—	—	—	—
NHL totals			17	0	0	0	4	—	—	—	—	—

Medal record

Representing Canada

Ice hockey

World Junior Championships
Gold medal – first place	2020 Czech Republic	

=== International ===
Year	Team	Event	Result	GP	G	A	Pts	PIM
2016	Canada White	U17	4th	6	1	2	3	2
2018	Canada	U18	5th	5	5	0	5	2
2020	Canada	WJC	1st place, gold medalist(s)	7	0	2	2	0
Junior totals				18	6	4	10	4
