= Rafaël Harvey-Pinard =

Canadian ice hockey player (born 1999)

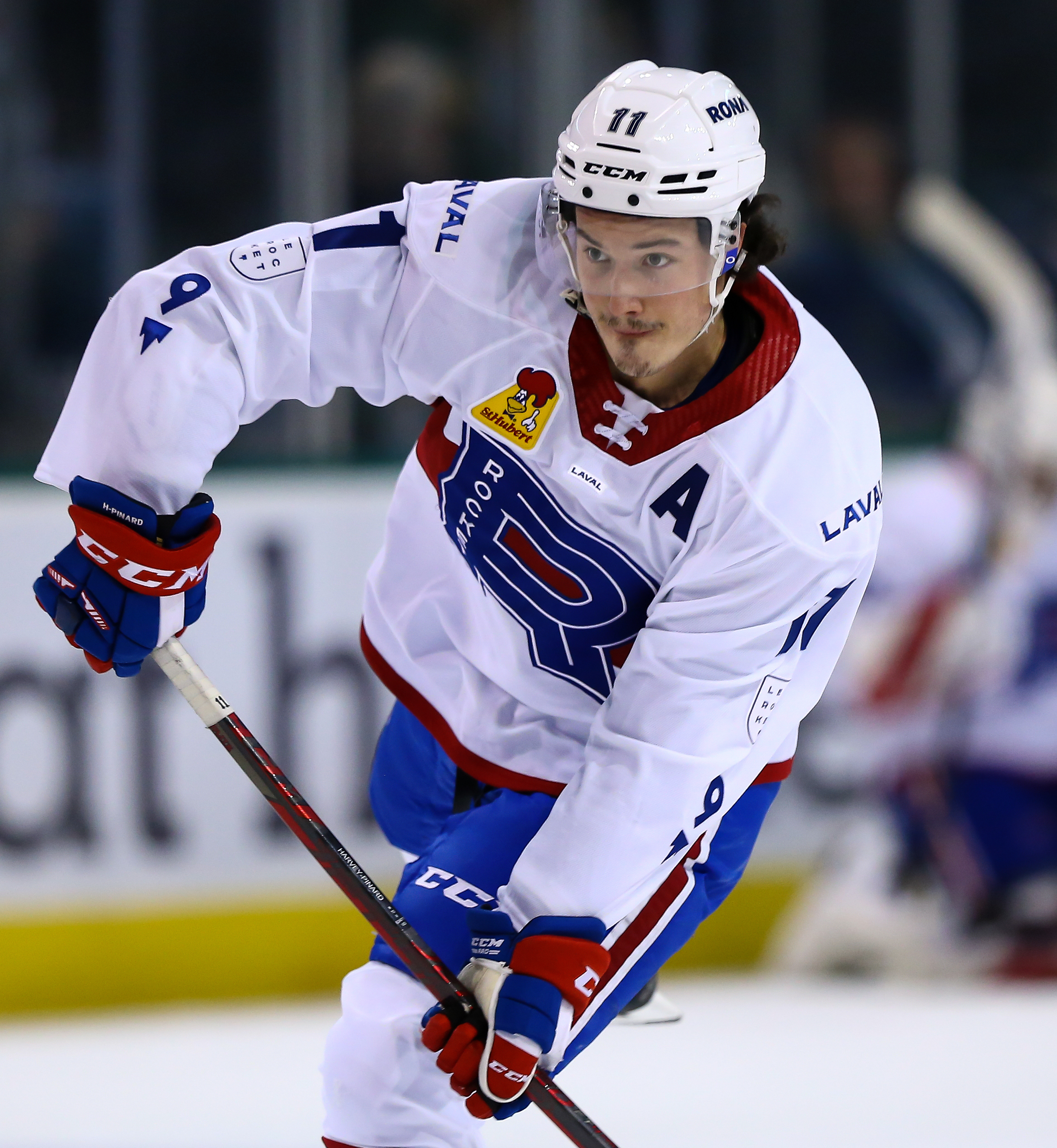
- Harvey-Pinard with the Laval Rocket in January 2022
- Born: January 6, 1999 (age 27) Jonquière, Quebec, Canada
- Height: 5 ft 9 in (175 cm)
- Weight: 173 lb (78 kg; 12 st 5 lb)
- Position: Left wing
- Shoots: Left
- AHL team Former teams: WBS Penguins; Montreal Canadiens; Pittsburgh Penguins
- NHL draft: 201st overall, 2019; Montreal Canadiens
- Playing career: 2021–present

Rafaël Harvey-Pinard (born January 6, 1999) is a Canadian professional ice hockey winger for the Wilkes-Barre/Scranton Penguins of the American Hockey League (AHL). He was selected in the seventh round, 201st overall, by the Montreal Canadiens in the 2019 NHL entry draft.

== Playing career ==
=== Junior ===
Harvey-Pinard first played midget hockey in his native Quebec, with the Jonquière Élites of the Quebec Junior AAA Hockey League (QMAAA) from 2014 to 2016. Showing early promise with the Élites, he was taken in the eighth round of the 2015 Quebec Major Junior Hockey League (QMJHL) draft by the Rouyn-Noranda Huskies. Despite his late selection, he had impressed the scouting staff of Rouyn-Noranda, who described him as "something like a first-round or second-round pick" in value.

Going overlooked in both the 2017 and 2018 iterations of the NHL entry draft, he was invited by the Vegas Golden Knights to attend their 2018 fall training camp, where he drew encouragement from Vegas star Jonathan Marchessault, an undrafted player of similarly short stature. In his third and fourth seasons in the QMJHL, Harvey-Pinard served as team captain of the Huskies. In the 2018–19 season, he led them in a historic year that included a 25-game winning streak and saw them win both the President's Cup as league champions and Memorial Cup as national champions of the Canadian Hockey League (CHL). Collectively, Harvey-Pinard registered 40 goals and 45 assists during the regular season, and 20 points in 27 playoff games, almost half of those coming in the final round against the Halifax Mooseheads, including a hat-trick and two multi-goal games. Despite his successes that year, he was not optimistic about being picked in the 2019 NHL entry draft and did not travel to Vancouver to attend in person. He was ultimately selected by the Montreal Canadiens in the seventh round, 201st overall.

After being deemed to have excelled at his first Canadiens rookie camp, he was sent back to the QMJHL. Rouyn-Noranda traded Harvey-Pinard to the Chicoutimi Saguenéens in advance of the 2019–20 season, and he was immediately named team captain. Chicoutimi proved to be one of the best teams in the league, with Harvey-Pinard recording 34 goals and 44 assists in 62 games. However, the onset of the COVID-19 pandemic led to the remainder of the season being cancelled, and both the President's Cup playoffs and the Memorial Cup tournament were not held as a result. At the time of the cancellation, the Saguenéens were third across QMJHL league standings.

=== Professional ===
Following the completion of his major junior career, Harvey-Pinard was signed to a one-year contract with the Laval Rocket of the American Hockey League (AHL), the primary affiliate of the Canadiens, on May 29, 2020. In the pandemic-delayed 2020–21 season, he embarked on his professional career and registered 9nine goals and 20 points in 36 regular season games. Towards the final stages of his rookie season, Harvey-Pinard was signed by the Canadiens to a two-year, entry-level contract, on May 13, 2021. He became known among many fans as "Lavallagher", a portmanteau of the city name and the surname of Canadiens forward Brendan Gallagher, to whom he was frequently compared in terms of stature, work ethic, and style of play.

Harvey-Pinard was recalled by the Canadiens following an outbreak of COVID-19 among the team's regulars in December 2021. He made his NHL debut on December 28 against the Tampa Bay Lightning, registering his first career NHL goal while skating on a line with Ryan Poehling and Cole Caufield. He played in two more games before being sent back to Laval. On April 20, 2022, he was recalled again from Laval. He scored his first career hat-trick on March 25, 2023, in an 8–2 victory over the Columbus Blue Jackets. During this stretch of the 2022–23 season, with many of the team's players sidelined by injury, Harvey-Pinard earned the opportunity to play on the Canadiens' first line with team captain Nick Suzuki.

On July 3, Harvey-Pinard signed a two-year contract extension with the Canadiens with an annual value of $1.1 million.

Entering the 2024–25 season, it was announced that Harvey-Pinard required surgery after suffering a broken leg. Because of this, he missed significant playing time. On November 19, 2024, Harvey-Pinard was assigned to Laval for the purpose of a long-term injury conditioning loan. Shortly thereafter, he was placed on waivers by the Canadiens and went unclaimed to remain with the Rocket. After posting 11 points through 24 AHL games with Laval, he was recalled by Montreal on January 25, 2025, and made his season debut with the team on January 30 versus the Minnesota Wild. He was reassigned to the AHL ranks the following day.

Entering the offseason as a restricted free agent, Harvey-Pinard was not extended a qualifying offer by the Canadiens on June 30, 2025. Two days later, he would agree to a one-year contract with the Pittsburgh Penguins.

At the completion of his contract with Pittsburgh, Harvey-Pinard opted to remain within the organization by signing a one-year AHL contract to continue with the Wilkes-Barre/Scranton Penguins for the 2026–27 season on July 7, 2026.

== Personal life ==
Harvey-Pinard's family owns and operates a local pizzeria in Arvida, Quebec. He has three siblings, including his sister, Katherine, who works as a sports journalist with the Montreal-based newspaper La Presse.

== Career statistics ==
			Regular season					Playoffs
Season	Team	League	GP	G	A	Pts	PIM	GP	G	A	Pts	PIM
2014–15	Jonquière Élites	QMAAA	4	0	0	0	0	2	0	0	0	0
2015–16	Jonquière Élites	QMAAA	45	18	34	52	4	7	4	2	6	2
2015–16	Rouyn-Noranda Huskies	QMJHL	3	0	0	0	0	—	—	—	—	—
2016–17	Rouyn-Noranda Huskies	QMJHL	50	10	13	23	6	7	1	0	1	2
2017–18	Rouyn-Noranda Huskies	QMJHL	67	26	50	76	38	7	5	3	8	2
2018–19	Rouyn-Noranda Huskies	QMJHL	66	40	45	85	24	20	13	14	27	10
2019–20	Chicoutimi Saguenéens	QMJHL	62	34	44	78	16	—	—	—	—	—
2020–21	Laval Rocket	AHL	36	9	11	20	2	—	—	—	—	—
2021–22	Laval Rocket	AHL	69	21	35	56	20	15	5	5	10	6
2021–22	Montreal Canadiens	NHL	4	1	0	1	0	—	—	—	—	—
2022–23	Laval Rocket	AHL	40	16	15	31	20	2	0	0	0	0
2022–23	Montreal Canadiens	NHL	34	14	6	20	10	—	—	—	—	—
2023–24	Montreal Canadiens	NHL	45	2	8	10	6	—	—	—	—	—
2024–25	Laval Rocket	AHL	40	5	14	19	14	13	0	3	3	26
2024–25	Montreal Canadiens	NHL	1	0	0	0	0	—	—	—	—	—
2025–26	Wilkes-Barre/Scranton Penguins	AHL	66	21	18	39	31	10	2	2	4	16
2025–26	Pittsburgh Penguins	NHL	1	0	0	0	0	—	—	—	—	—
NHL totals			85	17	14	31	16	—	—	—	—	—

== Awards and honours ==
Award	Year	Ref
CHL
CHL Canada/Russia Series	2017, 2018	
Memorial Cup champion	2019	
QMJHL
President's Cup champion	2019	
Marcel Robert Trophy	2020	
