= Pavel Koltygin =

Russian ice hockey centre

- Born: February 17, 1999 (age 27) Moscow, Russia
- Height: 6 ft 0 in (183 cm)
- Weight: 195 lb (88 kg; 13 st 13 lb)
- Position: Centre
- Shoots: Left
- VHL team Former teams: HC Tambov; HC Vityaz; SKA Saint Petersburg; Lada Togliatti
- NHL draft: 176th overall, 2017; Nashville Predators
- Playing career: 2019–present

Pavel Gennadevich Koltygin (Russian: Павел Геннадьевич Колтыгин; born February 17, 1999) is a Russian professional ice hockey centre currently playing for HC Tambov of the Supreme Hockey League (VHL).

== Playing career ==
Koltygin played as a youth in his native Russian within the Dynamo Moscow junior program. With NHL aspirations he was selected 9th overall in the 2016 CHL Import Draft by the Drummondville Voltigeurs of the Quebec Major Junior Hockey League (QMJHL).

He spent three seasons in the QMJHL for the Drummondville Voltigeurs and was drafted in the sixth round, 176th overall, in the 2017 NHL entry draft by the Nashville Predators

On 2 June 2019, Koltygin returned to Russia to begin his professional career in the Kontinental Hockey League, agreeing to a two-year contract with HC Vityaz. In his first full professional campaign in 2019–20, Koltygin made his debut in the KHL, going pointless through 28 regular season games. On 8 May 2020, Koltygin was traded by Vityaz to powerhouse club, SKA Saint Petersburg, in exchange for Nail Yakupov.

After three seasons within SKA, Koltygin was traded to Lada Togliatti in exchange for financial compensation on 6 July 2023.

== Career statistics ==
=== Regular season and playoffs ===
			Regular season					Playoffs
Season	Team	League	GP	G	A	Pts	PIM	GP	G	A	Pts	PIM
2015–16	Team Russia U18	MHL	17	1	4	5	8	3	0	0	0	2
2016–17	Drummondville Voltigeurs	QMJHL	65	22	25	47	44	4	1	0	1	6
2017–18	Drummondville Voltigeurs	QMJHL	64	17	25	42	44	10	5	2	7	0
2018–19	Drummondville Voltigeurs	QMJHL	63	25	17	42	49	16	7	7	14	8
2019–20	HC Vityaz	KHL	28	0	0	0	8	2	0	0	0	0
2020–21	SKA-Neva	VHL	16	2	0	2	10	—	—	—	—	—
2021–22	SKA-Neva	VHL	43	12	15	27	20	16	1	3	4	8
2022–23	SKA-Neva	VHL	16	2	4	6	22	1	0	0	0	0
2022–23	SKA Saint Petersburg	KHL	11	0	1	1	6	—	—	—	—	—
2023–24	Lada Togliatti	KHL	14	1	5	6	16	—	—	—	—	—
2024–25	Lada Togliatti	KHL	2	0	0	0	0	—	—	—	—	—
KHL totals			55	1	6	7	30	2	0	0	0	0

=== International ===
Year	Team	Event	Result	GP	G	A	Pts	PIM
2017	Russia	U18	3rd place, bronze medalist(s)	7	1	3	4	4
Junior totals				7	1	3	4	4
