= Arnaud Durandeau =

Canadian ice hockey player (born 1999)

- Born: January 14, 1999 (age 27) Montreal, Quebec, Canada
- Height: 6 ft 0 in (183 cm)
- Weight: 194 lb (88 kg; 13 st 12 lb)
- Position: Left wing
- Shoots: Left
- Slovak Extraliga team Former teams: HKM Zvolen; New York Islanders; Amur Khabarovsk
- NHL draft: 165th overall, 2017; New York Islanders
- Playing career: 2019–present

Arnaud Durandeau (born January 14, 1999) is a Canadian professional ice hockey winger who is currently playing with HKM Zvolen in the Slovak Extraliga. He was selected in the sixth round, 165th overall, by the New York Islanders of the National Hockey League (NHL) in the 2017 NHL Entry Draft.

== Early life ==
Durandeau was born on January 14, 1999, in Montreal to parents Fabienne and Marc. He grew up alongside three siblings: Eva, Alix, and Adrien, the former who plays college ice hockey for Brown University of the National Collegiate Athletic Association (NCAA).

== Playing career ==
=== Minor ===
Growing up in Quebec, Durandeau played pewee hockey for the Lakeshore Panthers M15 AA team from 2011 to 2013. During the 2011–12 season, Durandeau helped the Panthers maintain a perfect 21–0 record to begin the season. At the end of the season, Durandeau played on the Lac St. Louis Lions under-13 team at the Équipe Québec annual Hockey Tournament, where they finished 13th overall. Durandeau was tied for second on the team with two goals. Durandeau returned to the Panthers for the 2012–13 season, where he scored 19 goals and 17 assists for 36 points over 28 games. This would be his last season with the Panthers as he was promoted to the Lac St-Louis Lions Bantam AAA team the following year.

Durandeau began the 2014–15 season with the Lac St-Louis Lions in the Quebec AAA Midget Hockey League (QMAAA). He started his rookie season strong, tallying nine goals and 4 assists over his first eight games. As a result, Durandeau was named the league's September Rookie of the Month. Durandeau finished the season with 25 goals and 26 assists for 51 points while playing on a line with Joe Veleno. He also helped the Lions qualify for the QMAAA playoffs where he tallied 19 points en route to the Finals. His effort with the Panthers was recognized by Quebec Major Junior Hockey League (QMJHL) scouts and he was ranked 8th among eligible skaters for the 2015 QMJHL Draft. He was eventually drafted seventh overall by the Halifax Mooseheads, making him the highest draft pick for the Mooseheads since Jonathan Drouin in 2011.

=== Junior ===
Following the QMJHL draft, Durandeau was one of eight rookies who joined the Mooseheads for the 2015–16 season. While playing for the Mooseheads, Durandeau and his high-school aged teammates were enrolled at Prince Andrew High School (now called Woodlawn High School). Durandeau scored his first career QMJHL goal on September 19 against the Saint John Sea Dogs to help lead the Mooseheads to an eventual 5–1 win. He continued to pick up points throughout September and October and accumulated three goals and two assists for five points through his first 18 games. In November, Durandeau was a last-minute selection for team Canada Black to compete at the 2015 World U-17 Hockey Challenge. In January 2016, Durandeau was the only Moosehead recognized as a QMJHL Scholastic Player of the Month. Durandeau finished his rookie season with 12 goals and 17 assists for 29 points over 63 games.

Durandeau returned to the Moosehead for the 2016–17 season. In October 2016, Durandeau was the only Moosehead recognized as a QMJHL Scholastic Player of the Month. By mid-February Durandeau had tallied 12 goals and 21 assists for 33 points and was honoured by the QMJHL for being a player who "exemplifies the importance of academic achievement." During the season, Durandeau was considered a 'C' list prospect and was expected to be drafted in the later rounds of the 2017 NHL Entry Draft. He ended his sophomore season with a career-high 41 points through 64 games and was ranked 177th amongst all eligible skaters. Durandeau was eventually selected by the New York Islanders in the sixth round, 165th overall, of the 2017 NHL Entry Draft.

Durandeau participated in the Islanders training camp ahead of the 2017–18 season but was returned to the Mooseheads to complete his third major junior season. He had been the youngest player on the Islander's 57-man training camp roster. Upon rejoining the Mooseheads, Durandeau maintained a four-game point streak to start the season. By the end of the month, Durandeau ranked third on the team with five goals and nine assists for 14 points through 15 games. As a result of his play, he was selected to represent the QMJHL in the 2017 CHL Canada/Russia Series.

Durandeau returned to the Moosehead for the 2018–19 season, his final season with the Mooseheads. On February 11, Durandeau recorded two goals and two assists for four points in a 6–1 win over the Acadie–Bathurst Titan. This moved him into 14th place on the Moosehead's all-time scoring list and sixth place for the franchise's longest ironman streak. In March, Durandeau was named a nominee for the Marcel Robert Trophy as the QMJHL's Scholastic Player of the Year. Durandeau played a significant role in the Mooseheads' 2019 President's Cup playoffs run. Durandeau tallied an assist in Game 6 to force a Game 7 against the Quebec Remparts in the first round. He would finish that series tied for second on the team with six points. During the third round, Durandeau scored the game-winning goal in the second overtime period to lift the Mooseheads to their first win of the Semi-Finals against the Drummondville Voltigeurs. He later scored his seventh postseason goal in Game 6 to help the Mooseheads win the series and qualify for the President's Cup Finals.

=== Professional ===
Following his four-year major junior career in the QMJHL, Durandeau was signed by the Islanders to a three-year, entry-level contract on May 31, 2019. In his first professional season, Durandeau split the 2019–20 season with the Islanders affiliates, the Bridgeport Sound Tigers of the American Hockey League (AHL) and the Worcester Railers of the ECHL.

Before the 2022–23 season, Durandeau was signed to a two-year, two-way contract extension by the Islanders. He was recalled from the AHL and made his National Hockey League (NHL) debut with the Islanders on February 20, 2023, against the Pittsburgh Penguins.

Durandeau was traded to the New Jersey Devils on November 26, 2023, in exchange for Tyce Thompson. On March 11, 2024, he was traded for a second time during the 2023–24 season to the Montreal Canadiens in exchange for Nathan Légaré.

As an unrestricted free agent entering the NHL free agency period, Durandeau signed overseas with Russian club, Amur Khabarovsk of the Kontinental Hockey League (KHL) on July 3, 2024.

Having concluded his contract with Khabarovsk, Durandeau returned to North America and remained an un-signed free agent leading into the 2025–26 season. On October 23, 2025, Durandeau agreed to a PTO in joining reigning champions, the Abbotsford Canucks, the primary affiliate to the Vancouver Canucks.

== Career statistics ==
=== Regular season and playoffs ===
			Regular season					Playoffs
Season	Team	League	GP	G	A	Pts	PIM	GP	G	A	Pts	PIM
2014–15	Lac St-Louis Lions	QMAAA	42	25	26	51	28	16	8	11	19	12
2015–16	Halifax Mooseheads	QMJHL	63	12	17	29	20	—	—	—	—	—
2016–17	Halifax Mooseheads	QMJHL	64	15	26	41	70	6	2	3	5	6
2017–18	Halifax Mooseheads	QMJHL	67	20	33	53	56	9	5	7	12	10
2018–19	Halifax Mooseheads	QMJHL	68	38	35	73	46	23	10	10	20	26
2019–20	Bridgeport Sound Tigers	AHL	21	5	3	8	12	—	—	—	—	—
2019–20	Worcester Railers	ECHL	15	5	3	8	4	—	—	—	—	—
2020–21	Bridgeport Sound Tigers	AHL	14	4	4	8	4	—	—	—	—	—
2021–22	Bridgeport Islanders	AHL	64	15	22	37	30	6	1	1	2	4
2022–23	Bridgeport Islanders	AHL	68	24	31	55	35	—	—	—	—	—
2022–23	New York Islanders	NHL	4	0	0	0	2	—	—	—	—	—
2023–24	Bridgeport Islanders	AHL	12	1	3	4	23	—	—	—	—	—
2023–24	Utica Comets	AHL	26	3	11	14	8	—	—	—	—	—
2023–24	Laval Rocket	AHL	10	2	4	6	0	—	—	—	—	—
2024–25	Amur Khabarovsk	KHL	37	3	5	8	16	—	—	—	—	—
2025–26	Abbotsford Canucks	AHL	19	0	3	3	8	—	—	—	—	—
NHL totals			4	0	0	0	2	—	—	—	—	—

=== International ===
Year	Team	Event	Result	GP	G	A	Pts	PIM
2015	Canada Black	U17	8th	5	2	2	4	2
Junior totals				5	2	2	4	2
