= Joël Teasdale =

Canadian ice hockey player (born 1999)

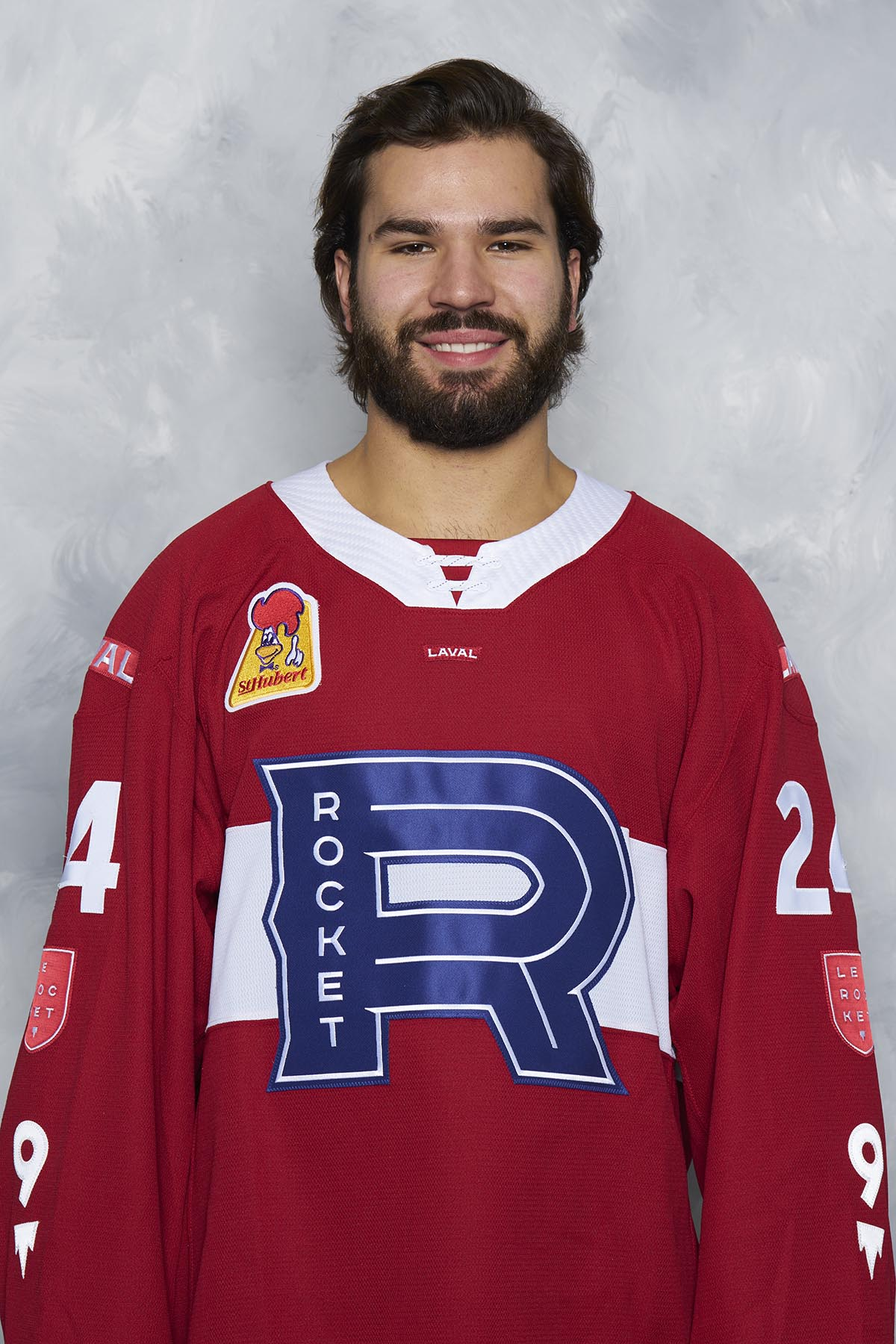
- Teasdale with the Laval Rocket in 2022
- Born: March 11, 1999 (age 27) Repentigny, Quebec, Canada
- Height: 6 ft 0 in (183 cm)
- Weight: 212 lb (96 kg; 15 st 2 lb)
- Position: Left wing
- Shoots: Left
- Slovak team Former teams: HK Spišská Nová Ves; Montreal Canadiens
- NHL draft: Undrafted
- Playing career: 2020–present

Joël Teasdale (born March 11, 1999) is a Canadian professional ice hockey left winger for HK Spišská Nová Ves of the Slovak Extraliga.

== Early life ==
He was born in Repentigny, Quebec.

== Playing career ==
Teasdale signed a three-year, entry-level contract with the Montreal Canadiens on September 21, 2018.

Prior to what would have been his first professional season in 2019–20, Teasdale suffered torn ligaments in his right knee during off-season training. He was initially projected to miss a minimum of seven months. However, he ended up missing the entire season.

On July 13, 2022, Teasdale signed a one-year contract extension with Montreal. Near the end of his third season playing for the Laval Rocket, Teasdale was recalled by Montreal and made his NHL debut against the New York Islanders on April 12, 2023.

Following the season, Montreal did not tender him a qualifying offer, making Teasdale an unrestricted free agent. He signed a one-year contract with the Iowa Wild on August 7, 2023.

On September 6, 2024, Teasdale signed a professional tryout contract with the Syracuse Crunch. He signed an AHL contract with Syracuse on December 9.

== Career statistics ==
			Regular season					Playoffs
Season	Team	League	GP	G	A	Pts	PIM	GP	G	A	Pts	PIM
2015–16	Blainville-Boisbriand Armada	QMJHL	53	11	16	27	10	11	3	0	3	2
2016–17	Blainville-Boisbriand Armada	QMJHL	60	18	29	47	25	18	5	10	15	15
2017–18	Blainville-Boisbriand Armada	QMJHL	65	32	33	65	14	22	8	13	21	14
2018–19	Blainville-Boisbriand Armada	QMJHL	37	19	19	38	29	—	—	—	—	—
2018–19	Rouyn-Noranda Huskies	QMJHL	29	24	18	42	19	20	14	20	34	12
2020–21	Laval Rocket	AHL	26	8	10	18	4	—	—	—	—	—
2021–22	Laval Rocket	AHL	44	15	13	28	17	15	1	1	2	18
2022–23	Laval Rocket	AHL	58	23	15	38	27	2	0	0	0	2
2022–23	Montreal Canadiens	NHL	2	0	1	1	0	—	—	—	—	—
2023–24	Iowa Wild	AHL	65	7	6	13	23	—	—	—	—	—
2024–25	Syracuse Crunch	AHL	62	8	11	19	48	3	0	0	0	2
NHL totals			2	0	1	1	0	—	—	—	—	—
