= Kevin Mandolese =

Canadian ice hockey player (born 2000)

- Born: August 22, 2000 (age 26) Ottawa, Ontario, Canada
- Height: 6 ft 4 in (193 cm)
- Weight: 180 lb (82 kg; 12 st 12 lb)
- Position: Goaltender
- Catches: Left
- AHL team Former teams: Laval Rocket; Ottawa Senators; HKM Zvolen
- NHL draft: 157th overall, 2018; Ottawa Senators
- Playing career: 2021–present

Kevin Mandolese (born August 22, 2000) is a Canadian professional ice hockey player who is a goaltender for the Laval Rocket of the American Hockey League (AHL). He was selected in the sixth round, 157th overall, by the Ottawa Senators in the 2018 NHL entry draft.

== Playing career ==
=== Junior ===
Growing up in Blainville, Quebec, Mandolese played minor hockey for the Collège Esther-Blondin Phénix in the Québec Midget AAA League (QMAAA) before being selected by the Cape Breton Screaming Eagles in the Quebec Major Junior Hockey League (QMJHL) entry draft. He recorded his first career QMJHL win on October 9, 2016, in a 5–3 victory over the Charlottetown Islanders.

During his sophomore QMJHL season in 2017–18, Mandolese posted a goals against average (GAA) of 3.46 and a .884 save percentage (SV%). As a result of his play, Mandolese was ranked second amongst all North American goaltenders eligible for the annual National Hockey League (NHL) entry draft. After being selected by the Ottawa Senators in 2018 (157th overall), he attended the team's rookie camp before returning to the Screaming Eagles.

Over the course of his final year of major junior in 2019–20, Mandolese experienced a breakout season during the shortened campaign and became the third Eagles goaltender to play in his 150th regular-season game, behind Marc-André Fleury and Olivier Roy. Collectively, he led all goaltenders league-wide in SV% and ranked third in GAA. For his efforts, he was named as finalist for the CHL Goaltender of the Year Award. He, along with teammate Egor Sokolov, also became the first two franchise players to be simultaneous league First Team All-Stars. On April 13, 2020, Mandolese signed a three-year, entry-level contract with the Senators organization.

=== Professional ===
Initially assigned to the Senators' American Hockey League (AHL) affiliate the Belleville Senators to begin the 2020–21 season, Mandolese earned his first professional win in a 3–2 victory over the Toronto Marlies at Canadian Tire Centre on May 21, 2021. That September, he was invited to the Senators' 2021 training camp, but was ultimately sent to Belleville for the 2021–22 season. Mandolese also briefly played with the Atlanta Gladiators of the ECHL.

After splitting time between Belleville and the ECHL's Allen Americans to begin the 2022–23 season, Mandolese was recalled by the Senators on January 26, 2023, following injuries to goaltenders Cam Talbot and Mads Søgaard. However, after interim starter Anton Forsberg was himself injured, he was called upon to man the crease and subsequently made his NHL debut on February 14, 2023, against the New York Islanders. Stopping 46 of 48 shots on goal, Mandolese secured the 3–2 victory in a shootout. Thereafter, he made his second start in a 3–1 loss to the Boston Bruins on February 20, prior to returning to the AHL ranks. Being recalled again the following month, Mandolese appeared in his third game for the Senators in a 5–1 loss to the Calgary Flames on March 12.

Despite attending Ottawa's 2023 training camp, Mandolese was assigned to Belleville for much of the 2023–24 season. He was recalled by Ottawa and remained on their active roster from January 31 to February 13, but did not see any game action.

In the following offseason, Mandolese, now a pending restricted free agent, was traded by the Senators along with a 2026 seventh-round pick to the Colorado Avalanche on July 15, 2024. The following day, he agreed to a one-year, two-way contract extension for the 2024–25 season. Mandolese was subsequently placed on waivers during training camp and joined the Avalanche's AHL affiliate, the Colorado Eagles, for the 2024–25 season.

As an unrestricted free agent from the Avalanche at the conclusion of his contract, Mandolese went unsigned over the summer free agency period. On September 28, 2025, he was signed to a professional tryout (PTO) with the Laval Rocket. After being released by the Rocket, Mandolese then joined the Charlotte Checkers, top affiliate of the Florida Panthers, on a PTO basis in mid-October. Making a lone appearance for the Checkers on November 8, 2025, he was later released and was signed under similar circumstances by the Syracuse Crunch in early December. By month's end, Mandolese agreed to terms overseas with HKM Zvolen of the Slovak Extraliga for the remainder of the 2025–26 season.

After just a single season abroad, Mandolese ultimately returned to North America, signing a one-year AHL contract with the Laval Rocket on July 1, 2026.

== International play ==
Internationally, Mandolese first represented Hockey Canada as part of team Canada Red at the 2016 World U-17 Hockey Challenge where his team ultimately finished in sixth place.

In April 2018, he was named to the national under-18 team for the annual IIHF World U18 Championships, but did not appear in tournament play.

== Personal life ==
Born in Ottawa, Mandolese and his family moved to Blainville located on Montreal's North Shore when he was six years old. While playing in the QMJHL, he attended Cape Breton University and majored in business.

== Career statistics ==
			Regular season									Playoffs
Season	Team	League	GP	W	L	OTL	MIN	GA	SO	GAA	SV%	GP	W	L	MIN	GA	SO	GAA	SV%
2015–16	Collège Esther-Blondin Phénix	QMAAA	28	21	3	3	1,541	60	3	2.34	.910	10	6	4	582	32	1	3.30	.899
2016–17	Cape Breton Screaming Eagles	QMJHL	27	16	8	0	1,469	85	0	3.47	.890	3	0	2	149	12	0	4.84	.876
2017–18	Cape Breton Screaming Eagles	QMJHL	37	15	13	2	1,769	63	1	3.46	.884	5	1	4	307	20	0	3.91	.875
2018–19	Cape Breton Screaming Eagles	QMJHL	50	29	12	5	2,846	136	3	2.87	.895	11	5	6	688	29	1	2.53	.916
2019–20	Cape Breton Eagles	QMJHL	37	26	8	1	2,115	82	2	2.33	.925	—	—	—	—	—	—	—	—
2020–21	Belleville Senators	AHL	9	3	6	0	506	34	0	4.03	.888	—	—	—	—	—	—	—	—
2021–22	Belleville Senators	AHL	17	9	5	0	885	46	0	3.12	.901	—	—	—	—	—	—	—	—
2021–22	Atlanta Gladiators	ECHL	6	1	4	1	359	16	0	2.68	.916	—	—	—	—	—	—	—	—
2022–23	Belleville Senators	AHL	17	6	8	3	1,007	56	0	3.33	.890	—	—	—	—	—	—	—	—
2022–23	Ottawa Senators	NHL	3	1	2	0	182	10	0	3.29	.916	—	—	—	—	—	—	—	—
2022–23	Allen Americans	ECHL	7	5	1	0	410	18	0	2.64	.927	9	4	5	498	26	1	3.13	.914
2023–24	Belleville Senators	AHL	23	10	9	3	1133	58	1	3.07	.901	—	—	—	—	—	—	—	—
2023–24	Allen Americans	ECHL	2	0	2	0	119	7	0	3.53	.918	—	—	—	—	—	—	—	—
2024–25	Colorado Eagles	AHL	19	11	6	0	1045	50	1	2.87	.903	—	—	—	—	—	—	—	—
2025–26	Charlotte Checkers	AHL	1	1	0	0	60	2	0	2.00	.933	—	—	—	—	—	—	—	—
2025–26	Syracuse Crunch	AHL	1	1	0	0	60	1	0	1.00	.933	—	—	—	—	—	—	—	—
2025–26	HKM Zvolen	Slovak	11	7	4	0	663	35	0	3.17	.914	2	0	2	120	5	0	2.51	.688
NHL totals			3	1	2	0	182	10	0	3.29	.916	—	—	—	—	—	—	—	—

=== International ===
Year	Team	Event	Result	GP	W	L	T	MIN	GA	SO	GAA	SV%
2016	Canada Red	U17	6th	3	1	2	0	176	6	1	2.04	.931
2018	Canada	U18	5th	DNP
Junior totals				3	1	2	0	176	6	1	2.04	.931

== Awards and honours ==
Award	Year	Ref
CHL
CHL/NHL Top Prospects Game	2018	
QMJHL
First All-Star Team	2020	
Goaltender of the Year	2020	
