= 2018–19 QMJHL season =

- League: Quebec Major Junior Hockey League
- Sport: Hockey
- Duration: Regular season September 20, 2018 – March 16, 2019
- Teams: 18
- TV partner(s): Eastlink TV; TVA Sports; MATV

Draft
- Top draft pick: Hendrix Lapierre
- Picked by: Chicoutimi Saguenéens

Regular season
- Jean Rougeau Trophy: Rouyn-Noranda Huskies (3)
- Season MVP: Alexis Lafrenière (Rimouski Océanic)
- Top scorer: Peter Abbandonato (Rouyn-Noranda Huskies)

Playoffs
- Playoffs MVP: Noah Dobson (Huskies)
- Finals champions: Rouyn-Noranda Huskies
- Runners-up: Halifax Mooseheads

QMJHL seasons
- 2017–18 2019–20

2018–19 CHL seasons
- League: Canadian Hockey League
- Sport: Hockey
- Duration: OHL; September 2018 – March 2019; QMJHL; September 2018 – March 2019; WHL; September 2018 – March 2019
- Teams: 60
- TV partner(s): TVA Sports; Rogers Sportsnet; Rogers TV; Shaw TV
- Season MVP: Alexis Lafrenière (Rimouski Océanic) (QMJHL)
- Top scorer: Jason Robertson (Kingston/Niagara) (OHL)

Memorial Cup
- Finals champions: Rouyn-Noranda Huskies (QMJHL) (1st title)
- Runners-up: Halifax Mooseheads (QMJHL)

The 2018–19 QMJHL season was the 50th season of the Quebec Major Junior Hockey League (QMJHL). The regular season began on September 20, 2018, and ended on March 16, 2019.

The playoffs started March 22, 2019 and ended on May 11. The winning team, the Rouyn-Noranda Huskies, were awarded the President's Cup as the QMJHL champion and earned a berth in the 2019 Memorial Cup, being hosted by the Halifax Mooseheads of the QMJHL at the Scotiabank Centre in Halifax, Nova Scotia from May 17–26, 2019.

== Regular season standings ==
Note: GP = Games played; W = Wins; L = Losses; OTL = Overtime losses; SL = Shootout losses; GF = Goals for; GA = Goals against; PTS = Points; x = clinched playoff berth; y = clinched division title; z = clinched Jean Rougeau Trophy

=== Eastern Conference ===
Maritimes Division	GP	W	L	OTL	SL	PTS	GF	GA	Rank
xy-Halifax Mooseheads	68	49	15	2	2	102	300	164	1
x-Charlottetown Islanders	68	40	21	4	3	87	233	211	4
x-Cape Breton Screaming Eagles	68	40	22	1	5	86	267	214	5
x-Moncton Wildcats	68	38	21	4	5	85	274	222	7
Saint John Sea Dogs	68	13	49	2	4	32	169	364	9
Acadie–Bathurst Titan	68	8	54	5	1	22	141	336	10

East Division	GP	W	L	OTL	SL	PTS	GF	GA	Rank
xy-Baie-Comeau Drakkar	68	49	15	2	2	102	306	189	2
x-Rimouski Océanic	68	44	20	4	0	92	272	173	3
x-Chicoutimi Saguenéens	68	39	22	3	4	85	218	205	6
x-Quebec Remparts	68	27	28	7	6	67	197	236	8

=== Western Conference ===
West Division	GP	W	L	OTL	SL	PTS	GF	GA	Rank
xyz-Rouyn-Noranda Huskies	68	59	8	0	1	119	320	138	1
x-Val-d'Or Foreurs	68	25	36	4	3	57	186	283	5
x-Blainville-Boisbriand Armada	68	26	40	2	0	54	196	270	6
x-Gatineau Olympiques	68	23	39	4	2	52	194	248	7

Central Division	GP	W	L	OTL	SL	PTS	GF	GA	Rank
xy-Drummondville Voltigeurs	68	52	13	2	1	107	338	173	2
x-Sherbrooke Phoenix	68	36	27	2	3	77	249	247	3
x-Victoriaville Tigres	68	30	33	4	1	65	188	219	4
x-Shawinigan Cataractes	68	14	49	2	3	33	188	347	8

== Scoring leaders ==
Note: GP = Games played; G = Goals; A = Assists; Pts = Points; PIM = Penalty minutes

Player	Team	GP	G	A	Pts	PIM
Peter Abbandonato	Rouyn-Noranda Huskies	68	29	82	111	14
Ivan Chekhovich	Baie-Comeau Drakkar	66	43	62	105	38
Alexis Lafrenière	Rimouski Océanic	61	37	68	105	72
Joe Veleno	Drummondville Voltigeurs	59	42	62	104	19
Jeremy McKenna	Moncton Wildcats	68	45	52	97	35
Jimmy Huntington	Rimouski Océanic	66	40	52	92	52
Jakob Pelletier	Moncton Wildcats	65	39	50	89	24
Nathan Légaré	Baie-Comeau Drakkar	68	45	42	87	52
Nicolas Guay	Drummondville Voltigeurs	64	40	47	87	35
Samuel Asselin	Acadie–Bathurst/Halifax	69	48	38	86	62

== Leading goaltenders ==
Note: GP = Games played; Mins = Minutes played; W = Wins; L = Losses: OTL = Overtime losses; SL = Shootout losses; GA = Goals Allowed; SO = Shutouts; GAA = Goals against average

Player	Team	GP	Mins	W	L	OTL	SOL	GA	SO	Sv%	GAA
Samuel Harvey	Rouyn-Noranda Huskies	43	2505:29	35	8	0	0	87	4	.926	2.08
Olivier Rodrigue	Drummondville Voltigeurs	48	2795:50	35	9	2	1	113	3	.902	2.43
Colten Ellis	Rimouski Océanic	46	2649:18	27	15	2	0	109	3	.910	2.47
Tristan Côté-Cazenave	Victoriaville Tigres	42	2324:31	20	15	2	1	96	5	.920	2.48
Alexis Gravel	Halifax Mooseheads	49	2869:39	33	13	1	2	119	5	.913	2.49

== 2019 President's Cup playoffs ==
In the first two rounds seeding is determined by conference standings, and in the two final rounds seeding is determined by overall standings.

Conference quarter-finals
W1	Rouyn-Noranda	4
W8	Shawinigan	2
W4	Victoriaville	4
W5	Val-d'Or	3
E3	Rimouski	4
E6	Chicoutimi	0
E4	Charlottetown	2
E5	Cape Breton	4
W2	Drummondville	4
W7	Gatineau	1
W3	Sherbrooke	4
W6	Blainville-Boisbriand	1
E1	Halifax	4
E8	Quebec	3
E2	Baie-Comeau	3
E7	Moncton	4

Conference semi-finals
W1	Rouyn-Noranda	4
W4	Victoriaville	0
E3	Rimouski	4
E5	Cape Breton	1
W2	Drummondville	4
W3	Sherbrooke	1
E1	Halifax	4
E7	Moncton	0

Semi-finals
1	Rouyn-Noranda	4
5	Rimouski	0
2	Drummondville	2
3	Halifax	4

President's Cup Championship
1	Rouyn-Noranda	4
3	Halifax	2

== Conference quarter-finals ==
=== Western Conference quarter-finals ===
==== (1) Rouyn-Noranda Huskies vs. (8) Shawinigan Cataractes ====
March 22	Shawinigan Cataractes	1 – 4	Rouyn-Noranda Huskies	Aréna Iamgold	Recap
No scoring		First period	No scoring
No scoring		Second period	15:37 - Alex Beaucage (1)
Valentin Nussbaumer (1) - 2:19		Third period	2:06 - Justin Bergeron (1); 3:04 - Samuel Naud (1); 3:27 - Jakub Lauko (1)
Justin Blanchette (47 saves / 51 shots)		Goalie stats	Samuel Harvey (24 saves / 25 shots)

March 23	Shawinigan Cataractes	4 – 3	Rouyn-Noranda Huskies	Aréna Iamgold	Recap
Vincent Senez-Allaire (2) - 0:53; Mavrik Bourque (1) - pp - 9:45; Leon Denny (1) - pp - 10:48		First period	13:45 - Justin Bergeron (2)
No scoring		Second period	2:16 - pp - William Cyr (1)
Mikael Robidoux (1) - 18:23		Third period	8:46 - Peter Abbandonato (1)
Justin Blanchette (57 saves / 60 shots)		Goalie stats	Zachary Émond (1 save / 4 shots); Samuel Harvey (16 saves / 17 shots)

March 26	Rouyn-Noranda Huskies	5 – 0	Shawinigan Cataractes	Centre Gervais Auto	Recap
Félix Bibeau (1) - pp - 3:28		First period	No scoring
Noah Dobson (1) - 8:32; Joël Teasdale (1) - 10:15		Second period	No scoring
Vincent Marleau (1) - 13:47; Ryan MacLellan (1) - pp - 19:55		Third period	No scoring
Samuel Harvey (22 saves / 22 shots)		Goalie stats	Justin Blanchette (29 saves / 34 shots)

March 27	Rouyn-Noranda Huskies	3 – 4	Shawinigan Cataractes	Centre Gervais Auto	Recap
Jakub Lauko (2) - 5:04; Joël Teasdale (2) - 17:03		First period	3:00 - pp - Jan Drozg (1)
No scoring		Second period	13:14 - Mavrik Bourque (2); 15:30 - pp - Charles Beaudoin (1)
Noah Dobson (2) - 6:54		Third period	18:43 - pp - Gabriel Denis (1)
Samuel Harvey (18 saves / 22 shots)		Goalie stats	Justin Blanchette (40 saves / 43 shots)

March 29	Rouyn-Noranda Huskies	7 – 3	Shawinigan Cataractes	Centre Gervais Auto	Recap
10:11 - Félix Bibeau (2); 15:46 - Louis-Filip Côté (1)		First period	Jan Drozg (2) - 1:10; Jan Drozg (3) - pp - 11:19
4:37 - pp - Rafaël Harvey-Pinard (1); 4:55 - Joël Teasdale (3); 8:05 - Patrik Hrehorčák (1)		Second period	Jan Drozg (4) - 7:12
5:30 - pp - Rafaël Harvey-Pinard (2); 11:05 - pp - Rafaël Harvey-Pinard (3)		Third period	No scoring
Samuel Harvey (18 saves / 21 shots)		Goalie stats	Justin Blanchette (30 saves / 36 shots); Antoine Coulombe (7 saves / 8 shots)

April 1	Shawinigan Cataractes	2 – 8	Rouyn-Noranda Huskies	Aréna Iamgold	Recap
13:34 - Jérémy Martin (1)		First period	Peter Abbandonato (2) - pp - 4:03; Justin Bergeron (3) - 6:09; Patrik Hrehorčák (2) - 12:34
12:40 - Pierre-Olivier Bourgeois (1)		Second period	Joël Teasdale (4) - pp - 14:28
No scoring		Third period	Félix Bibeau (3) - pp - 3:17; Rafaël Harvey-Pinard (4) - pp - 6:53; Patrik Hrehorčák (3) - 10:18; Mathieu Gagnon (1) - 17:03
Justin Blanchette (9 saves / 12 shots); Antoine Coulombe (31 saves / 36 shots)		Goalie stats	Samuel Harvey (16 saves / 18 shots)

Rouyn-Noranda wins series 4–2

==== (2) Drummondville Voltigeurs vs. (7) Gatineau Olympiques ====
March 22	Gatineau Olympiques	0 – 4	Drummondville Voltigeurs	Centre Marcel Dionne	Recap
No scoring		First period	1:39 - pp - Joe Veleno (1); 8:56 - Félix Lauzon (1); 10:58 - Joe Veleno (2)
No scoring		Second period	13:53 - pp - Joe Veleno (3)
No scoring		Third period	No scoring
Rémi Poirier (40 saves / 44 shots)		Goalie stats	Anthony Morrone (17 saves / 17 shots)

March 23	Gatineau Olympiques	1 – 4	Drummondville Voltigeurs	Centre Marcel Dionne	Recap
Mathieu Bizier (1) - 17:32		First period	6:25 - Gregor MacLeod (1); 8:00 - Max Comtois (1)
No scoring		Second period	No scoring
No scoring		Third period	3:26 - pp - Max Comtois (2); 12:29 - Max Comtois (3)
Rémi Poirier (35 saves / 39 shots)		Goalie stats	Anthony Morrone (13 saves / 14 shots)

March 26	Drummondville Voltigeurs	7 – 4	Gatineau Olympiques	Robert Guertin Centre	Recap
Xavier Simoneau (1) - 0:08; Dawson Mercer (1) - 4:47		First period	11:04 - pp - Pier-Olivier Roy (1); 14:41 - Giordano Finoro (1)
Jarrett Baker (1) - 6:47; Dawson Mercer (2) - 8:24; Joe Veleno (4) - 9:35		Second period	No scoring
Nicolas Beaudin (1) - sh - 0:59; Brandon Skubel (1) - 19:46		Third period	6:49 - pp - Pier-Olivier Roy (2); 10:52 - pp - Charles-Antoine Roy (1)
Anthony Morrone (16 saves / 20 shots)		Goalie stats	Rémi Poirier (38 saves / 44 shots)

March 27	Drummondville Voltigeurs	2 – 4	Gatineau Olympiques	Robert Guertin Centre	Recap
Nicolas Beaudin (2) - 7:02; Brandon Skubel (2) - 19:50		First period	15:36 - pp - Mathieu Bizier (2)
No scoring		Second period	16:01 - pp - Charles-Antoine Roy (2)
No scoring		Third period	0:14 - Charles-Antoine Roy (3); 18:36 - en - Giordano Finoro (2)
Anthony Morrone (16 saves / 19 shots)		Goalie stats	Rémi Poirier (47 saves / 49 shots)

March 29	Gatineau Olympiques	1 – 6	Drummondville Voltigeurs	Centre Marcel Dionne	Recap
No scoring		First period	No scoring
No scoring		Second period	3:45 - Rémy Anglehart (1); 17:38 - Gregor MacLeod (2)
Giordano Finoro (3) - 3:28		Third period	3:03 - Max Comtois (4); 4:15 - Joe Veleno (5); 5:21 - Nicolas Guay (1); 8:21 - Gregor MacLeod (3)
Rémi Poirier (42 saves / 48 shots)		Goalie stats	Anthony Morrone (11 saves / 12 shots)

Drummondville wins series 4–1

==== (3) Sherbrooke Phoenix vs. (6) Blainville-Boisbriand Armada ====
March 22	Blainville-Boisbriand Armada	5 – 1	Sherbrooke Phoenix	Palais des Sports Léopold-Drolet	Recap
Alexander Katerinakis (1) - 12:44; Cole Fraser (1) - 13:43		First period	No scoring
Simon Pinard (1) - 12:50		Second period	19:00 - Sam Poulin (1)
Blake Richardson (1) - 8:33; Simon Pinard (2) - en - 16:37		Third period	No scoring
Brendan Cregan (33 saves / 34 shots)		Goalie stats	Dakota Lund-Cornish (26 saves / 30 shots)

March 23	Blainville-Boisbriand Armada	0 – 6	Sherbrooke Phoenix	Palais des Sports Léopold-Drolet	Recap
No scoring		First period	14:09 - Sam Poulin (2)
No scoring		Second period	2:46 - Alexandre Joncas (1); 8:10 - Sam Poulin (3); 17:19 - Bobby Dow (1); 19:12 - pp - Nathaël Roy (1)
No scoring		Third period	13:21 - pp - Sam Poulin (4)
Brendan Cregan (38 saves / 44 shots)		Goalie stats	Dakota Lund-Cornish (17 saves / 17 shots)

March 26	Sherbrooke Phoenix	6 – 3	Blainville-Boisbriand Armada	Centre d'Excellence Sports Rousseau	Recap
No scoring		First period	9:25 - sh - Tyler Hylland (1)
Benjamin Tardif (1) - pp - 19:56		Second period	No scoring
Félix Robert (1) - 1:48; Félix Robert (2) - 10:39; Yann-Félix Lapointe (1) - 13:08; Sam Poulin (5) - 18:10; Patrick Guay (1) - pp - en - 19:14		Third period	2:12 - pp - Samuel Bolduc (1); 12:33 - Tyler Hylland (2)
Dakota Lund-Cornish (34 saves / 37 shots)		Goalie stats	Brendan Cregan (35 saves / 40 shots)

March 27	Sherbrooke Phoenix	6 – 2	Blainville-Boisbriand Armada	Centre d'Excellence Sports Rousseau	Recap
Ryan Da Silva (1) - 4:54; Félix Robert (3) - 8:00		First period	No scoring
Alex-Olivier Voyer (1) - 1:25; Benjamin Tardif (2) - 5:48; Patrick Guay (2) - 12:56		Second period	7:29 - Jasper Rannisto (1)
No scoring		Third period	9:39 - Zachary Roy (1)
Dakota Lund-Cornish (23 saves / 25 shots)		Goalie stats	Brendan Cregan (37 saves / 42 shots)

March 29	Blainville-Boisbriand Armada	1 – 4	Sherbrooke Phoenix	Palais des Sports Léopold-Drolet	Recap
Simon Pinard (3) - 1:00		First period	No scoring
No scoring		Second period	6:48 - Oliver Okuliar (1)
No scoring		Third period	11:21 - Michaël Kemp (1); 16:42 - Benjamin Tardif (3); 19:00 - en - Bobby Dow (2)
Brendan Cregan (30 saves / 33 shots)		Goalie stats	Dakota Lund-Cornish (24 saves / 25 shots)

Sherbrooke wins series 4–1

==== (4) Victoriaville Tigres vs. (5) Val d'Or Foreurs ====
March 22	Val d'Or Foreurs	2 – 4	Victoriaville Tigres	Colisée Desjardins	Recap
No scoring		First period	9:58 - pp - Egor Serdyuk (1); 11:54 - pp - Egor Serdyuk (2)
No scoring		Second period	No scoring
Félix Boivin (1) - 14:21; Yan Dion (1) - pp - 17:51		Third period	9:52 - Jordan Brière (1); 16:20 - Egor Serdyuk (3)
Jonathan Lemieux (29 saves / 33 shots)		Goalie stats	Tristan Côté-Cazenave (23 saves / 25 shots)

March 24	Val d'Or Foreurs	2 – 4	Victoriaville Tigres	Colisée Desjardins	Recap
Marshall Lessard (1) - 10:59		First period	9:14 - Feliks Morozov (1); 14:12 - Simon Lafrance (1)
No scoring		Second period	6:16 - Dominic Cormier (1)
Ivan Kozlov (1) - 17:57		Third period	18:53 - en - Anthony Poulin (1)
Jonathan Lemieux (40 saves / 43 shots)		Goalie stats	Tristan Côté-Cazenave (25 saves / 27 shots)

March 26	Victoriaville Tigres	3 – 4	OT	Val d'Or Foreurs	Centre Air Creebec	Recap
Sean Larochelle (1) - pp - 18:56		First period		7:42 - Félix Boivin (2)
No scoring		Second period		No scoring
Anthony Poulin (2) - 14:25; Isaiah Gallo-Demetris (1) - 14:48		Third period		3:36 - Jérémy Michel (1); 19:02 - pp - Yan Dion (2)
No scoring		First overtime period		13:59 - Marshall Lessard (2)
Tristan Côté-Cazenave (29 saves / 33 shots)		Goalie stats		Jonathan Lemieux (33 saves / 36 shots)

March 27	Victoriaville Tigres	3 – 5	Val d'Or Foreurs	Centre Air Creebec	Recap
Conor Frenette (1) - 16:35		First period	0:21 - Nicolas Ouellet (1); 12:34 - pp - Julien Tessier (1); 19:23 - Maxence Guénette (1)
Simon Lafrance (2) - 11:11		Second period	18:11 - Julien Tessier (2)
Anthony Poulin (3) - 2:30		Third period	19:56 - en - Peyton Hoyt (1)
Tristan Côté-Cazenave (27 saves / 31 shots)		Goalie stats	Jonathan Lemieux (35 saves / 38 shots)

March 29	Victoriaville Tigres	1 – 2	Val d'Or Foreurs	Centre Air Creebec	Recap
No scoring		First period	Félix Boivin (3) - pp - 6:47
No scoring		Second period	Nicolas Ouellet (2) - 16:03
19:33 - pp - Sean Larochelle (2)		Third period	No scoring
Tristan Côté-Cazenave (27 saves / 29 shots)		Goalie stats	Jonathan Lemieux (35 saves / 36 shots)

April 1	Val d'Or Foreurs	2 – 6	Victoriaville Tigres	Colisée Desjardins	Recap
11:44 - Daniil Berestnev (1); 14:47 - pp - David Noël (1)		First period	Olivier Mathieu (1) - 7:20; Jérôme Gravel (1) - 13:11
No scoring		Second period	Dominic Cormier (2) - pp - 7:54
No scoring		Third period	Anthony Poulin (4) - 3:39; Simon Lafrance (3) - 8:20; Anthony Poulin (5) - en - 14:22
Jonathan Lemieux (45 saves / 50 shots)		Goalie stats	Tristan Côté-Cazenave (18 saves / 20 shots)

April 2	Val d'Or Foreurs	3 – 4	OT	Victoriaville Tigres	Colisée Desjardins	Recap
Karl Boudrias (1) - 16:07		First period		14:41 - Simon Lafrance (4)
Julien Tessier (3) - 14:41		Second period		8:29 - Édouard Ouellet (1); 12:23 - Feliks Morozov (2)
Nicolas Ouellet (3) - pp - 4:47		Third period		No scoring
No scoring		First overtime period		0:35 - Olivier Mathieu (2)
Jonathan Lemieux (28 saves / 32 shots)		Goalie stats		Tristan Côté-Cazenave (24 saves / 27 shots)

Victoriaville wins series 4–3

=== Eastern Conference quarter-finals ===
==== (1) Halifax Mooseheads vs. (8) Quebec Remparts ====
March 22	Quebec Remparts	3 – 2	Halifax Mooseheads	Scotiabank Centre	Recap
Matthew Grouchy (1) - pp - 11:50		First period	No scoring
Luke Kutkevicius (1) - pp - 7:25		Second period	9:22 - sh - Justin Barron (1)
Pierrick Dubé (1) - 6:01		Third period	8:00 - pp - Jared McIsaac (1)
Carmine-Anthony Pagliarulo (19 saves / 21 shots)		Goalie stats	Alexis Gravel (19 saves / 22 shots)

March 23	Quebec Remparts	5 – 4	OT	Halifax Mooseheads	Scotiabank Centre	Recap
Andrew Coxhead (1) - 3:44; Jérémy Laframboise (1) - 15:01		First period		8:43 - pp - Arnaud Durandeau (1)
Sam Dunn (1) - pp - 14:41; Andrew Coxhead (2) - pp - 19:34		Second period		5:22 - Arnaud Durandeau (2); 12:04 - Maxim Trépanier (1)
No scoring		Third period		16:21 - Raphaël Lavoie (1)
Philipp Kurashev (1) - pp - 11:40		First overtime period		No scoring
Carmine-Anthony Pagliarulo (41 saves / 45 shots)		Goalie stats		Alexis Gravel (25 saves / 29 shots); Cole McLaren (7 saves / 8 shots)

March 26	Halifax Mooseheads	3 – 1	Quebec Remparts	Centre Vidéotron	Recap
Arnaud Durandeau (3) - pp - 15:11		First period	No scoring
Raphaël Lavoie (2) - 3:48		Second period	No scoring
Raphaël Lavoie (3) - en - 19:18		Third period	9:05 - Luke Kutkevicius (2)
Alexis Gravel (25 saves / 26 shots)		Goalie stats	Carmine-Anthony Pagliarulo (24 saves / 26 shots)

March 28	Halifax Mooseheads	5 – 4	Quebec Remparts	Centre Vidéotron	Recap
Maxim Trépanier (2) - pp - 13:49		First period	9:18 - Étienne Verrette (1)
Antoine Morand (1) - 8:18; Samuel Asselin (1) - 10:22		Second period	No scoring
Antoine Morand (2) - 9:52; Raphaël Lavoie (4) - en - 18:30		Third period	4:29 - Félix-Olivier Chouinard (1); 17:09 - Andrew Coxhead (3); 18:45 - pp - Gabriel Montreuil (1)
Alexis Gravel (29 saves / 33 shots)		Goalie stats	Carmine-Anthony Pagliarulo (41 saves / 45 shots)

March 30	Halifax Mooseheads	2 – 4	Quebec Remparts	Centre Vidéotron	Recap
No scoring		First period	No scoring
18:25 - Raphaël Lavoie (5)		Second period	Matthew Grouchy (2) - pp - 0:30; Pier-Olivier Lacombe (1) - pp - 7:32; Pierrick Dubé (2) - 8:34
19:17 - Arnaud Durandeau (4)		Third period	Édouard St-Laurent (1) - ps - 11:34
Alexis Gravel (30 saves / 34 shots)		Goalie stats	Carmine-Anthony Pagliarulo (22 saves / 24 shots)

April 1	Quebec Remparts	1 – 6	Halifax Mooseheads	Scotiabank Centre	Recap
10:27 - Samuel Dickner (1)		First period	Raphaël Lavoie (6) - 4:58
No scoring		Second period	Antoine Morand (3) - 18:05; Keith Getson (1) - 19:08
No scoring		Third period	Samuel Asselin (2) - 0:26; Raphaël Lavoie (7) - en - 13:40; Keith Getson (2) - pp - 17:13
Carmine-Anthony Pagliarulo (26 saves / 30 shots); Kyle Jessiman (9 saves / 10 shots)		Goalie stats	Alexis Gravel (23 saves / 24 shots)

April 2	Quebec Remparts	1 – 3	Halifax Mooseheads	Scotiabank Centre	Recap
Sam Dunn (2) - 8:22		First period	14:09 - pp - Maxim Trépanier (3)
No scoring		Second period	4:41 - Jocktan Chainey (1)
No scoring		Third period	0:52 - Keith Getson (3)
Carmine-Anthony Pagliarulo (28 saves / 31 shots)		Goalie stats	Alexis Gravel (26 saves / 27 shots)

Halifax wins series 4–3

==== (2) Baie-Comeau Drakkar vs. (7) Moncton Wildcats ====
March 22	Moncton Wildcats	1 – 2	OT	Baie-Comeau Drakkar	Centre Henry-Leonard	Recap
No scoring		First period		No scoring
Nathan Légaré (1) - 1:38		Second period		15:55 - Charles-Antoine Giguère (1)
No scoring		Third period		No scoring
No scoring		First overtime period		10:41 - Christopher Benoit (1)
Francis Leclerc (47 saves / 49 shots)		Goalie stats		Alex D'Orio (18 saves / 19 shots)

March 23	Moncton Wildcats	5 – 2	Baie-Comeau Drakkar	Centre Henry-Leonard	Recap
Elliot Desnoyers (1) - 16:14		First period	No scoring
Alexander Khovanov (1) - pp - 13:21		Second period	11:22 - Ethan Crossman (1)
Elliot Desnoyers (2) - pp - 2:32; Jacob Hudson (1) - 12:47; Mika Cyr (1) - en - 18:52		Third period	6:52 - Samuel L'Italien (1)
Francis Leclerc (39 saves / 41 shots)		Goalie stats	Alex D'Orio (17 saves / 21 shots)

March 26	Baie-Comeau Drakkar	4 – 3	OT	Moncton Wildcats	Avenir Centre	Recap
Christopher Benoit (2) - 10:33		First period		17:50 - Adam Capannelli (1)
Ivan Chekhovich (1) - 18:25		Second period		No scoring
Yaroslav Alexeyev (1) - pp - 3:46		Third period		16:56 - pp - Jeremy McKenna (1); 18:50 - Jeremy McKenna (2)
Shawn Element (1) - 11:02		First overtime period		No scoring
Alex D'Orio (34 saves / 37 shots)		Goalie stats		Francis Leclerc (34 saves / 38 shots)

March 27	Baie-Comeau Drakkar	2 – 3	Moncton Wildcats	Avenir Centre	Recap
Keenan MacIsaac (1) - 17:31		First period	11:00 - Jonathan Aspirot (1)
No scoring		Second period	11:53 - Mika Cyr (2)
Nathan Légaré (2) - 7:42		Third period	11:31 - pp - Mika Cyr (3)
Alex D'Orio (28 saves / 31 shots)		Goalie stats	Francis Leclerc (35 saves / 37 shots)

March 29	Baie-Comeau Drakkar	5 – 2	Moncton Wildcats	Avenir Centre	Recap
4:55 - Shawn Element (2); 9:05 - Yaroslav Alexeyev (2); 15:01 - Ivan Chekhovich (2)		First period	No scoring
0:23 - Ivan Chekhovich (3)		Second period	No scoring
17:55 - en - Ethan Crossman (2)		Third period	Alexander Khovanov (2) - sh - 3:40; Adam Capannelli (2) - 6:20
Alex D'Orio (39 saves / 41 shots)		Goalie stats	Francis Leclerc (8 saves / 12 shots); Charles-Antoine Lavallée (21 saves / 21 shots)

April 1	Moncton Wildcats	3 – 1	Baie-Comeau Drakkar	Centre Henry-Leonard	Recap
8:18 - pp - Alexander Khovanov (3)		First period	No scoring
13:58 - Jakob Pelletier (1)		Second period	Samuel L'Italien (2) - pp - 19:23
18:41 - en - Jeremy McKenna (3)		Third period	No scoring
Francis Leclerc (33 saves / 34 shots)		Goalie stats	Alex D'Orio (30 saves / 32 shots)

April 2	Moncton Wildcats	3 – 2	Baie-Comeau Drakkar	Centre Henry-Leonard	Recap
Jeremy McKenna (4) - 3:51		First period	No scoring
Jacob Stewart (1) - 11:23; Mika Cyr (4) - 16:13		Second period	12:09 - Nathan Légaré (3)
No scoring		Third period	19:24 - Gabriel Fortier (1)
Francis Leclerc (36 saves / 38 shots)		Goalie stats	Alex D'Orio (16 saves / 19 shots)

Moncton wins series 4–3

==== (3) Rimouski Océanic vs. (6) Chicoutimi Saguenéens ====
March 22	Chicoutimi Saguenéens	3 – 4	OT	Rimouski Océanic	Colisée Financière Sun Life	Recap
No scoring		First period		No scoring
No scoring		Second period		14:29 - pp - Charle-Edouard D'Astous (1); 15:19 - pp - Jeffrey Durocher (1); 15:59 - pp - Jimmy Huntington (1)
Théo Rochette (1) - pp - 6:01; Hendrix Lapierre (1) - 15:05; Théo Rochette (2) - pp - 19:57		Third period		No scoring
No scoring		First overtime period		15:53 - Jimmy Huntington (2)
Alexis Shank (31 saves / 35 shots)		Goalie stats		Colten Ellis (32 saves / 35 shots)

March 23	Chicoutimi Saguenéens	2 – 3	4OT	Rimouski Océanic	Colisée Financière Sun Life	Recap
No scoring		First period		2:15 - pp - Dmitry Zavgorodniy (1)
Théo Rochette (3) - pp - 2:51		Second period		No scoring
Théo Rochette (4) - pp - 16:52		Third period		18:56 - pp - Cédric Paré (1)
No scoring		Fourth overtime period		9:15 - D'Artagnan Joly (1)
Alexis Shank (80 saves / 83 shots)		Goalie stats		Colten Ellis (53 saves / 55 shots)

March 26	Rimouski Océanic	4 – 3	Chicoutimi Saguenéens	Centre Georges-Vézina	Recap
Jimmy Huntington (3) - 13:49		First period	17:00 - Zachary Lavigne (1)
Alexis Lafrenière (1) - 16:04; Alexis Lafrenière (2) - pp - 19:10; Jeffrey Durocher (2) - 19:48		Second period	11:46 - Hendrix Lapierre (2); 13:01 - Gabriel Villeneuve (1)
No scoring		Third period	No scoring
Colten Ellis (24 saves / 27 shots)		Goalie stats	Alexis Shank (30 saves / 34 shots)

March 27	Rimouski Océanic	6 – 3	Chicoutimi Saguenéens	Centre Georges-Vézina	Recap
Jimmy Huntington (4) - 6:41; Dmitry Zavgorodniy (2) - pp - 11:25; Dmitry Zavgorodniy (3) - 17:40		First period	14:10 - pp - Vladislav Kotkov (1)
Alexis Lafrenière (3) - 2:55; Dmitry Zavgorodniy (4) - 4:38; Anthony Gagnon (1) - pp - 10:01		Second period	14:19 - William Dufour (1); 15:21 - Hendrix Lapierre (3)
No scoring		Third period	No scoring
Colten Ellis (28 saves / 31 shots)		Goalie stats	Alexis Shank (24 saves / 30 shots)

Rimouski wins series 4–0

==== (4) Charlottetown Islanders vs. (5) Cape Breton Screaming Eagles ====
March 22	Cape Breton Screaming Eagles	2 – 3	2OT	Charlottetown Islanders	Eastlink Centre	Recap
Derek Gentile (1) - 13:22		First period		No scoring
No scoring		Second period		18:56 - Kevin Gursoy (1)
Mitchell Balmas (1) - 15:45		Third period		5:55 - pp - Daniel Hardie (1)
No scoring		Second overtime period		5:43 - Brett Budgell (1)
Kevin Mandolese (39 saves / 42 shots)		Goalie stats		Matthew Welsh (41 saves / 43 shots)

March 23	Cape Breton Screaming Eagles	4 – 6	Charlottetown Islanders	Eastlink Centre	Recap
No scoring		First period	9:40 - Kevin Gursoy (2); 18:16 - Daniel Hardie (2)
Mathias Laferrière (1) - 1:06; Mitchell Balmas (2) - pp - 9:22		Second period	10:59 - Daniel Hardie (3); 17:26 - Nikita Alexandrov (1)
Leon Gawanke (1) - pp - 2:06; Kyle Havlena (1) - 6:30		Third period	14:01 - Lukas Cormier (1); 19:14 - en - Zachary Beauregard (1)
Kevin Mandolese (28 saves / 33 shots)		Goalie stats	Matthew Welsh (30 saves / 34 shots)

March 26	Charlottetown Islanders	0 – 1	Cape Breton Screaming Eagles	Centre 200	Recap
No scoring		First period	No scoring
No scoring		Second period	16:26 - Egor Sokolov (1)
No scoring		Third period	No scoring
Matthew Welsh (22 saves / 23 shots)		Goalie stats	Kevin Mandolese (26 saves / 26 shots)

March 27	Charlottetown Islanders	2 – 6	Cape Breton Screaming Eagles	Centre 200	Recap
Jordan Maher (1) - 10:42		First period	4:01 - Leon Gawanke (2); 9:40 - Mitchell Balmas (3)
Nikita Alexandrov (2) - pp - 10:33		Second period	13:05 - Egor Sokolov (2); 14:38 - Derek Gentile (2)
No scoring		Third period	7:34 - pp - Mathias Laferrière (2); 13:21 - pp - Brooklyn Kalmikov (1)
Matthew Welsh (30 saves / 36 shots)		Goalie stats	Kevin Mandolese (23 saves / 25 shots)

March 29	Cape Breton Screaming Eagles	4 – 3	Charlottetown Islanders	Eastlink Centre	Recap
No scoring		First period	12:43 - pp - Nikita Alexandrov (3)
Shawn Boudrias (1) - 4:23; Shaun Miller (1) - 5:21; Derek Gentile (3) - 13:06; Mitchell Balmas (4) - 16:27		Second period	No scoring
No scoring		Third period	5:07 - Kevin Gursoy (3); 5:32 - Nikita Alexandrov (4)
Kevin Mandolese (33 saves / 36 shots)		Goalie stats	Matthew Welsh (21 saves / 25 shots)

March 31	Charlottetown Islanders	3 – 4	OT	Cape Breton Screaming Eagles	Centre 200	Recap
Zachary Beauregard (2) - 5:21		First period		10:13 - Gabriel Proulx (1); 10:50 - Egor Sokolov (3)
Xavier Fortin (1) - 9:19		Second period		No scoring
Thomas Casey (1) - 1:16		Third period		18:05 - Mitchell Balmas (5)
No scoring		First overtime period		11:00 - pp - Egor Sokolov (4)
Matthew Welsh (25 saves / 29 shots)		Goalie stats		Kevin Mandolese (33 saves / 36 shots)

Cape Breton wins series 4–2

== Conference semi-finals ==
=== Western Conference semi-finals ===
==== (1) Rouyn-Noranda Huskies vs. (4) Victoriaville Tigres ====
April 5	Victoriaville Tigres	0 – 4	Rouyn-Noranda Huskies	Aréna Iamgold	Recap
No scoring		First period	2:27 - Tyler Hinam (1)
No scoring		Second period	9:10 - Alexis Arsenault (1); 10:23 - pp - Rafaël Harvey-Pinard (5); 19:09 - Félix Bibeau (4)
No scoring		Third period	No scoring
Tristan Côté-Cazenave (45 saves / 49 shots)		Goalie stats	Samuel Harvey (23 saves / 23 shots)

April 6	Victoriaville Tigres	1 – 3	Rouyn-Noranda Huskies	Aréna Iamgold	Recap
No scoring		First period	14:49 - Jakub Lauko (3)
Simon Lafrance (5) - 6:45		Second period	No scoring
No scoring		Third period	13:53 - Joël Teasdale (5); 19:41 - en - Noah Dobson (3)
Tristan Côté-Cazenave (43 saves / 45 shots)		Goalie stats	Samuel Harvey (20 saves / 21 shots)

April 9	Rouyn-Noranda Huskies	8 – 0	Victoriaville Tigres	Colisée Desjardins	Recap
Peter Abbandonato (3) - pp - 0:53; Justin Bergeron (4) - pp - 10:39		First period	No scoring
Louis-Filip Côté (2) - 4:16; Tyler Hinam (2) - 5:06; Jakub Lauko (4) - 6:56; Alex Beaucage (2) - pp - 8:39		Second period	No scoring
Alex Beaucage (3) - 6:35; Vincent Marleau (2) - pp - 14:42		Third period	No scoring
Samuel Harvey (20 saves / 20 shots)		Goalie stats	Tristan Côté-Cazenave (13 saves / 17 shots); Fabio Iacobo (12 saves / 16 shots)

April 11	Rouyn-Noranda Huskies	6 – 2	Victoriaville Tigres	Colisée Desjardins	Recap
Peter Abbandonato (4) - 9:29; Alex Beaucage (4) - 13:28		First period	5:34 - Isaiah Gallo-Demetris (2); 7:39 - Mikhail Abramov (1)
Félix Bibeau (5) - pp - 1:21; Joël Teasdale (6) - pp - 4:53; Joël Teasdale (7) - pp - 6:41; Joël Teasdale (8) - pp - 11:51		Second period	No scoring
No scoring		Third period	No scoring
Samuel Harvey (21 saves / 23 shots)		Goalie stats	Tristan Côté-Cazenave (8 saves / 12 shots); Fabio Iacobo (21 saves / 23 shots)

Rouyn-Noranda wins series 4–0

==== (2) Drummondville Voltigeurs vs. (3) Sherbrooke Phoenix ====
April 5	Sherbrooke Phoenix	4 – 9	Drummondville Voltigeurs	Centre Marcel Dionne	Recap
Taro Jentzsch (2) - 3:08; Sam Poulin (6) - 14:49		First period	1:31 - Dawson Mercer (3); 1:47 - Max Comtois (5)
Sam Poulin (7) - 14:19		Second period	4:20 - Max Comtois (6); 5:31 - Félix Sabourin-Lauzon (2); 15:10 - Nicolas Guay (2)
Sam Poulin (8) - 16:20		Third period	8:51 - Gregor MacLeod (4); 11:52 - Rémy Anglehart (2); 16:55 - Marc-Olivier Duquette (1); 19:08 - Rémy Anglehart (3)
Dakota Lund-Cornish (34 saves / 43 shots)		Goalie stats	Anthony Morrone (24 saves / 28 shots)

April 6	Sherbrooke Phoenix	1 – 7	Drummondville Voltigeurs	Centre Marcel Dionne	Recap
No scoring		First period	9:35 - Nicolas Guay (3); 10:59 - Félix Sabourin-Lauzon (3); 11:04 - Gregor MacLeod (5); 12:45 - pp - Max Comtois (7); 18:17 - Gregor MacLeod (6)
Bobby Dow (3) - 1:36		Second period	0:23 - pp - Pavel Koltygin (1); 4:26 - Pavel Koltygin (2)
No scoring		Third period	No scoring
Dakota Lund-Cornish (25 saves / 32 shots); William Desmarais (18 saves / 18 shots)		Goalie stats	Anthony Morrone (21 saves / 22 shots)

April 8	Drummondville Voltigeurs	2 – 5	Sherbrooke Phoenix	Palais des Sports Léopold-Drolet	Recap
No scoring		First period	18:00 - pp - Patrick Guay (3)
Félix Sabourin-Lauzon (4) - 15:05		Second period	8:39 - Alex-Olivier Voyer (2); 16:27 - sh - Félix Robert (4); 19:59 - pp - Benjamin Tardif (4)
Xavier Simoneau (2) - 16:49		Third period	18:24 - en - Bobby Dow (4)
Anthony Morrone (23 saves / 27 shots)		Goalie stats	Dakota Lund-Cornish (26 saves / 28 shots)

April 10	Drummondville Voltigeurs	4 – 2	Sherbrooke Phoenix	Palais des Sports Léopold-Drolet	Recap
No scoring		First period	No scoring
Pavel Koltygin (3) - pp - 3:51; Xavier Simoneau (3) - 4:16; Félix Sabourin-Lauzon (5) - 18:43		Second period	15:00 - Julien Anctil (1)
Félix Sabourin-Lauzon (6) - sh - en - 19:10		Third period	14:07 - Patrick Guay (4)
Anthony Morrone (31 saves / 33 shots)		Goalie stats	Dakota Lund-Cornish (24 saves / 27 shots)

April 12	Sherbrooke Phoenix	2 – 3	2OT	Drummondville Voltigeurs	Centre Marcel Dionne	Recap
No scoring		First period		6:54 - Pavel Koltygin (4)
Julien Anctil (2) - 1:55		Second period		17:58 - Joe Veleno (6)
Olivier Crête-Belzile (1) - 17:30		Third period		No scoring
No scoring		Second overtime period		8:09 - Max Comtois (8)
Dakota Lund-Cornish (69 saves / 72 shots)		Goalie stats		Anthony Morrone (21 saves / 23 shots)

Drummondville wins series 4–1

=== Eastern Conference semi-finals ===
==== (1) Halifax Mooseheads vs. (7) Moncton Wildcats ====
April 5	Moncton Wildcats	3 – 5	Halifax Mooseheads	Scotiabank Centre	Recap
No scoring		First period	19:35 - pp - Raphaël Lavoie (8)
Alexander Khovanov (4) - 5:19; Brady Pataki (1) - 18:00		Second period	6:34 - Xavier Parent (1); 18:20 - Samuel Asselin (3)
Adam Capannelli (3) - 15:43		Third period	15:11 - Jared McIsaac (2); 19:55 - en - Raphaël Lavoie (9)
Francis Leclerc (49 saves / 53 shots)		Goalie stats	Alexis Gravel (20 saves / 23 shots)

April 6	Moncton Wildcats	2 – 3	Halifax Mooseheads	Scotiabank Centre	Recap
No scoring		First period	6:44 - Raphaël Lavoie (10); 13:26 - Raphaël Lavoie (11)
Mika Cyr (5) - 7:20		Second period	2:10 - Jocktan Chainey (2)
Aleksi Anttalainen (1) - 9:58		Third period	No scoring
Francis Leclerc (26 saves / 29 shots)		Goalie stats	Alexis Gravel (28 saves / 30 shots)

April 9	Halifax Mooseheads	4 – 2	Moncton Wildcats	Avenir Centre	Recap
Xavier Parent (2) - pp - 4:46; Raphaël Lavoie (12) - 11:28		First period	19:57 - Jordan Spence (1)
No scoring		Second period	No scoring
Brock McLeod (1) - 11:11; Raphaël Lavoie (13) - en - 19:05		Third period	7:56 - Christian Huntley (1)
Alexis Gravel (35 saves / 37 shots)		Goalie stats	Francis Leclerc (33 saves / 36 shots)

April 10	Halifax Mooseheads	4 – 2	Moncton Wildcats	Avenir Centre	Recap
No scoring		First period	14:17 - pp - Jakob Pelletier (2)
Patrick Kyte (1) - 15:10		Second period	13:47 - pp - Jeremy McKenna (5)
Keith Getson (4) - pp - 14:00; Antoine Morand (4) - 15:44; Joel Bishop (1) - en - 18:47		Third period	No scoring
Alexis Gravel (32 saves / 34 shots)		Goalie stats	Francis Leclerc (42 saves / 45 shots)

Halifax wins series 4–0

==== (3) Rimouski Océanic vs. (5) Cape Breton Screaming Eagles ====
April 5	Cape Breton Screaming Eagles	1 – 3	Rimouski Océanic	Colisée Financière Sun Life	Recap
Shawn Boudrias (2) - 3:34		First period	No scoring
No scoring		Second period	No scoring
No scoring		Third period	0:43 - Alexis Lafrenière (4); 17:07 - Olivier Garneau (1); 18:17 - en - Jimmy Huntington (5)
Kevin Mandolese (31 saves / 33 shots)		Goalie stats	Colten Ellis (30 saves / 31 shots)

April 7	Cape Breton Screaming Eagles	2 – 1	Rimouski Océanic	Colisée Financière Sun Life	Recap
No scoring		First period	No scoring
Mathias Laferrière (3) - 3:20		Second period	No scoring
Mitchell Balmas (6) - pp - 13:03		Third period	17:44 - Alexis Lafrenière (5)
Kevin Mandolese (28 saves / 29 shots)		Goalie stats	Colten Ellis (26 saves / 28 shots)

April 9	Rimouski Océanic	3 – 0	Cape Breton Screaming Eagles	Centre 200	Recap
Alexis Lafrenière (6) - 8:12		First period	No scoring
No scoring		Second period	No scoring
Carson MacKinnon (1) - 2:11; Alexis Lafrenière (7) - en - 17:30		Third period	No scoring
Colten Ellis (18 saves / 18 shots)		Goalie stats	Kevin Mandolese (18 saves / 20 shots)

April 11	Rimouski Océanic	5 – 2	Cape Breton Screaming Eagles	Centre 200	Recap
Olivier Garneau (2) - 2:07		First period	No scoring
Olivier Garneau (3) - 5:20		Second period	5:07 - pp - Shawn Boudrias (3)
D'Artagnan Joly (2) - 13:35; Jeffrey Durocher (3) - 14:28; Cédric Paré (2) - en - 18:34		Third period	19:09 - Kyle Havlena (2)
Colten Ellis (22 saves / 24 shots)		Goalie stats	Kevin Mandolese (27 saves / 31 shots)

April 12	Rimouski Océanic	5 – 3	Cape Breton Screaming Eagles	Centre 200	Recap
2:26 - Jimmy Huntington (6); 16:59 - Olivier Garneau (4)		First period	Mitchell Balmas (7) - pp - 6:19; Félix Lafrance (1) - 10:16
15:16 - Anthony Gagnon (2)		Second period	No scoring
4:41 - Radim Šalda (1); 19:29 - en - Olivier Garneau (5)		Third period	Derek Gentile (4) - 1:07
Colten Ellis (21 saves / 24 shots)		Goalie stats	Kevin Mandolese (30 saves / 34 shots)

Rimouski wins series 4–1

== Semi-finals ==
=== (1) Rouyn-Noranda Huskies vs. (5) Rimouski Océanic ===
April 19	Rimouski Océanic	1 – 5	Rouyn-Noranda Huskies	Aréna Iamgold	Recap
No scoring		First period	2:17 - Joël Teasdale (9); 4:21 - pp - Félix Bibeau (6)
No scoring		Second period	4:07 - Jakub Lauko (5); 16:05 - Jacob Neveu (1)
Jimmy Huntington (7) - 10:46		Third period	2:40 - pp - Joël Teasdale (10)
Colten Ellis (16 saves / 19 shots); Tristan Bérubé (22 saves / 24 shots)		Goalie stats	Samuel Harvey (31 saves / 32 shots)

April 20	Rimouski Océanic	3 – 4	Rouyn-Noranda Huskies	Aréna Iamgold	Recap
No scoring		First period	9:17 - Patrik Hrehorčák (4)
Alexis Lafrenière (8) - 8:55; Carson MacKinnon (2) - 9:06; Anthony Gagnon (3) - pp - 13:49		Second period	0:27 - Noah Dobson (4); 17:48 - Félix Bibeau (7)
No scoring		Third period	19:20 - Félix Bibeau (8)
Colten Ellis (40 saves / 44 shots)		Goalie stats	Samuel Harvey (28 saves / 31 shots)

April 23	Rouyn-Noranda Huskies	5 – 2	Rimouski Océanic	Colisée Financière Sun Life	Recap
Noah Dobson (5) - pp - 19:50		First period	5:21 - Olivier Garneau (6)
Justin Bergeron (5) - 7:16; Félix Bibeau (9) - 10:59		Second period	No scoring
Noah Dobson (6) - pp - 1:21; Vincent Marleau (3) - 2:23		Third period	10:30 - Radim Šalda (2)
Samuel Harvey (20 saves / 22 shots)		Goalie stats	Colten Ellis (17 saves / 20 shots); Tristan Bérubé (14 saves / 16 shots)

April 24	Rouyn-Noranda Huskies	6 – 3	Rimouski Océanic	Colisée Financière Sun Life	Recap
Jacob Neveu (2) - 8:08; Patrik Hrehorčák (5) - 16:13		First period	10:51 - Carson MacKinnon (3); 11:35 - Alexis Lafrenière (9)
Félix Bibeau (10) - 7:59		Second period	5:42 - Jeffrey Durocher (4)
Joël Teasdale (11) - 0:20; Félix Bibeau (11) - pp - 1:53; Justin Bergeron (6) - pp - 14:51		Third period	No scoring
Samuel Harvey (18 saves / 21 shots)		Goalie stats	Tristan Bérubé (28 saves / 34 shots)

Rouyn-Noranda wins series 4–0

=== (2) Drummondville Voltigeurs vs. (3) Halifax Mooseheads ===
April 19	Halifax Mooseheads	1 – 3	Drummondville Voltigeurs	Centre Marcel Dionne	Recap
Keith Getson (5) - pp - 17:28		First period	9:55 - Pavel Koltygin (5)
No scoring		Second period	14:59 - Pierre-Olivier Joseph (1)
No scoring		Third period	19:57 - Félix Lauzon (7)
Alexis Gravel (38 saves / 41 shots)		Goalie stats	Anthony Morrone (23 saves / 24 shots)

April 20	Halifax Mooseheads	5 – 4	2OT	Drummondville Voltigeurs	Centre Marcel Dionne	Recap
No scoring		First period		17:05 - Dawson Mercer (4)
Raphaël Lavoie (14) - pp - 6:54; Raphaël Lavoie (15) - pp - 8:01; Raphaël Lavoie (16) - 19:04		Second period		3:43 - Cédric Desruisseaux (1); 13:30 - Max Comtois (9)
Samuel Asselin (4) - pp - 18:41		Third period		11:25 - Pavel Koltygin (6)
Arnaud Durandeau (5) - 5:45		Second overtime period		No scoring
Alexis Gravel (38 saves / 42 shots)		Goalie stats		Anthony Morrone (50 saves / 55 shots)

April 23	Drummondville Voltigeurs	1 – 2	Halifax Mooseheads	Scotiabank Centre	Recap
No scoring		First period	8:24 - Samuel Asselin (5); 11:44 - Keith Getson (6)
No scoring		Second period	No scoring
Max Comtois (10) - 17:39		Third period	No scoring
Anthony Morrone (6 saves / 8 shots); Olivier Rodrigue (20 saves / 20 shots)		Goalie stats	Alexis Gravel (34 saves / 35 shots)

April 24	Drummondville Voltigeurs	2 – 5	Halifax Mooseheads	Scotiabank Centre	Recap
No scoring		First period	No scoring
Dawson Mercer (5) - pp - 10:01		Second period	11:03 - pp - Raphaël Lavoie (17); 14:21 - pp - Maxim Trépanier (4); 15:33 - Xavier Parent (3); 19:07 - pp - Antoine Morand (5)
Joe Veleno (7) - pp - 18:48		Third period	16:29 - en - Samuel Asselin (6)
Olivier Rodrigue (18 saves / 22 shots)		Goalie stats	Alexis Gravel (33 saves / 35 shots)

April 26	Halifax Mooseheads	2 – 6	Drummondville Voltigeurs	Centre Marcel Dionne	Recap
No scoring		First period	13:11 - Pavel Koltygin (7); 19:15 - pp - Cédric Desruisseaux (2)
Arnaud Durandeau (6) - 13:07; Maxim Trépanier (5) - 15:39		Second period	No scoring
No scoring		Third period	10:56 - Joe Veleno (8); 13:31 - pp - Pierre-Olivier Joseph (2); 18:32 - en - Max Comtois (11); 19:29 - pp - Rémy Anglehart (4)
Alexis Gravel (36 saves / 41 shots)		Goalie stats	Anthony Morrone (23 saves / 25 shots); Olivier Rodrigue (0 saves / 0 shots)

April 28	Drummondville Voltigeurs	1 – 2	OT	Halifax Mooseheads	Scotiabank Centre	Recap
No scoring		First period		8:28 - Arnaud Durandeau (7)
Gregor MacLeod (7) - 12:50		Second period		No scoring
No scoring		Third period		No scoring
No scoring		First overtime period		2:22 - Xavier Parent (4)
Anthony Morrone (27 saves / 29 shots)		Goalie stats		Alexis Gravel (33 saves / 34 shots)

Halifax wins series 4–2

== President's Cup Finals ==
=== (1) Rouyn-Noranda Huskies vs. (3) Halifax Mooseheads ===
May 2	Halifax Mooseheads	2 – 5	Rouyn-Noranda Huskies	Aréna Iamgold	Recap
Justin Barron (2) - 14:50		First period	4:01 - Rafaël Harvey-Pinard (6); 9:34 - Félix Bibeau (12)
Raphaël Lavoie (18) - sh - 13:47		Second period	7:38 - pp - Noah Dobson (7)
No scoring		Third period	0:49 - Rafaël Harvey-Pinard (7); 16:05 - pp - Félix Bibeau (13)
Alexis Gravel (32 saves / 37 shots)		Goalie stats	Samuel Harvey (34 saves / 36 shots)

May 3	Halifax Mooseheads	5 – 4	2OT	Rouyn-Noranda Huskies	Aréna Iamgold	Recap
Keith Getson (7) - 4:25; Benoit-Olivier Groulx (1) - 7:47		First period		5:35 - Rafaël Harvey-Pinard (8); 6:12 - Joël Teasdale (12)
Arnaud Durandeau (8) - 6:52		Second period		12:58 - pp - Noah Dobson (8); 18:10 - Félix Bibeau (14)
Raphaël Lavoie (19) - 1:42		Third period		No scoring
Benoit-Olivier Groulx (2) - 9:53		Second overtime period		No scoring
Alexis Gravel (41 saves / 45 shots)		Goalie stats		Samuel Harvey (49 saves / 54 shots)

May 6	Rouyn-Noranda Huskies	5 – 2	Halifax Mooseheads	Scotiabank Centre	Recap
Joël Teasdale (13) - 2:55; Justin Bergeron (7) - sh - 10:35; Justin Bergeron (8) - 14:12		First period	7:47 - Benoit-Olivier Groulx (3)
Tyler Hinam (3) - 16:03		Second period	7:37 - Samuel Asselin (7)
Joël Teasdale (14) - en - 19:17		Third period	No scoring
Samuel Harvey (31 saves / 33 shots)		Goalie stats	Alexis Gravel (30 saves / 34 shots)

May 7	Rouyn-Noranda Huskies	1 – 5	Halifax Mooseheads	Scotiabank Centre	Recap
Peter Abbandonato (5) - pp - 14:57		First period	3:43 - Benoit-Olivier Groulx (4)
No scoring		Second period	7:54 - Samuel Asselin (8); 16:43 - Jocktan Chainey (3)
No scoring		Third period	17:12 - Arnaud Durandeau (9); 18:30 - pp - Maxim Trépanier (6)
Samuel Harvey (32 saves / 37 shots)		Goalie stats	Alexis Gravel (29 saves / 30 shots)

May 9	Halifax Mooseheads	3 – 6	Rouyn-Noranda Huskies	Aréna Iamgold	Recap
Arnaud Durandeau (10) - 16:29; Raphaël Lavoie (20) - 19:58		First period	5:45 - Peter Abbandonato (6); 10:08 - pp - Rafaël Harvey-Pinard (9); 11:48 - Jakub Lauko (6); 14:23 - William Cyr (2)
No scoring		Second period	No scoring
Samuel Asselin (9) - pp - 3:57		Third period	19:24 - en - Rafaël Harvey-Pinard (10); 19:30 - en - Rafaël Harvey-Pinard (11)
Alexis Gravel (39 saves / 43 shots)		Goalie stats	Samuel Harvey (18 saves / 21 shots)

May 11	Rouyn-Noranda Huskies	4 – 0	Halifax Mooseheads	Scotiabank Centre	Recap
Tyler Hinam (4) - 13:32		First period	No scoring
Rafaël Harvey-Pinard (12) - 10:20		Second period	No scoring
Alex Beaucage (5) - 13:21; Rafaël Harvey-Pinard (13) - en - 18:49		Third period	No scoring
Samuel Harvey (28 saves / 28 shots)		Goalie stats	Alexis Gravel (31 saves / 34 shots)

Rouyn-Noranda wins series 4–2

== Playoff leading scorers ==
Note: GP = Games played; G = Goals; A = Assists; Pts = Points; PIM = Penalties minutes

Player	Team	GP	G	A	Pts	PIM
Joël Teasdale	Rouyn-Noranda Huskies	20	14	20	34	12
Raphaël Lavoie	Halifax Mooseheads	23	20	12	32	22
Félix Bibeau	Rouyn-Noranda Huskies	20	14	15	29	24
Noah Dobson	Rouyn-Noranda Huskies	20	8	21	29	20
Rafaël Harvey-Pinard	Rouyn-Noranda Huskies	20	13	14	27	10
Peter Abbandonato	Rouyn-Noranda Huskies	15	6	21	27	4
Alexis Lafrenière	Rimouski Océanic	13	9	14	23	14
Arnaud Durandeau	Halifax Mooseheads	23	10	10	20	26
Justin Bergeron	Rouyn-Noranda Huskies	19	8	12	20	8
Maxim Trépanier	Halifax Mooseheads	22	6	14	20	12

== Playoff leading goaltenders ==
Note: GP = Games played; Mins = Minutes played; W = Wins; L = Losses: OTL = Overtime losses; SL = Shootout losses; GA = Goals Allowed; SO = Shutouts; GAA = Goals against average

Player	Team	GP	Mins	W	L	GA	SO	Sv%	GAA
Samuel Harvey	Rouyn-Noranda Huskies	20	1216:48	16	4	40	4	.924	1.97
Anthony Morrone	Drummondville Voltigeurs	15	900:11	10	5	34	1	.904	2.27
Colten Ellis	Rimouski Océanic	12	737:06	8	4	29	1	.919	2.36
Alex D'Orio	Baie-Comeau Drakkar	7	436:38	3	4	18	0	.910	2.47
Kevin Mandolese	Cape Breton Screaming Eagles	11	687:45	5	6	29	1	.916	2.53

== Trophies and awards ==
- President's Cup – Playoff Champions: Rouyn-Noranda Huskies
- Jean Rougeau Trophy – Regular Season Champions: Rouyn-Noranda Huskies
- Luc Robitaille Trophy – Team with the best goals for average: Drummondville Voltigeurs
- Robert Lebel Trophy – Team with best GAA: Rouyn-Noranda Huskies

Player

- Michel Brière Memorial Trophy – Most Valuable Player: Alexis Lafrenière, Rimouski Océanic
- Jean Béliveau Trophy – Top Scorer: Peter Abbandonato, Rouyn-Noranda Huskies
- Guy Lafleur Trophy – Playoff MVP: Noah Dobson, Rouyn-Noranda Huskies
- Jacques Plante Memorial Trophy – Top Goaltender: Samuel Harvey, Rouyn-Noranda Huskies
- Guy Carbonneau Trophy – Best Defensive Forward: Félix Lauzon, Drummondville Voltigeurs
- Emile Bouchard Trophy – Defenceman of the Year: Charles-Édouard D'Astous, Rimouski Océanic
- Kevin Lowe Trophy – Best Defensive Defenceman: Jacob Neveu, Rouyn-Noranda Huskies
- Michael Bossy Trophy – Top Prospect: Raphaël Lavoie, Halifax Mooseheads
- RDS Cup – Rookie of the Year: Jordan Spence, Moncton Wildcats
- Michel Bergeron Trophy – Offensive Rookie of the Year: Hendrix Lapierre, Chicoutimi Saguenéens
- Raymond Lagacé Trophy – Defensive Rookie of the Year: Jordan Spence, Moncton Wildcats
- Frank J. Selke Memorial Trophy – Most sportsmanlike player: Peter Abbandonato, Rouyn-Noranda Huskies
- QMJHL Humanitarian of the Year – Humanitarian of the Year: Charle-Édouard D'Astous, Rimouski Océanic
- Marcel Robert Trophy – Best Scholastic Player: Matthew Welsh, Charlottetown Islanders
- Paul Dumont Trophy – Personality of the Year: Alexis Lafrenière, Rimouski Océanic

Executive

- Ron Lapointe Trophy – Coach of the Year: Mario Pouliot, Rouyn-Noranda Huskies
- Maurice Filion Trophy – General Manager of the Year: Mario Pouliot, Rouyn-Noranda Huskies

=== All-Star teams ===
First All-Star Team:

- Samuel Harvey, Goaltender, Rouyn-Noranda Huskies
- Charles-Édouard D'Astous, Defenceman, Rimouski Océanic
- Noah Dobson, Defenceman, Rouyn-Noranda Huskies
- Alexis Lafrenière, Forward, Rimouski Océanic
- Joe Veleno, Forward, Drummondville Voltigeurs
- Peter Abbandonato, Forward, Rouyn-Noranda Huskies

Second All-Star Team:

- Tristan Côté-Cazenave, Goaltender, Victoriaville Tigres
- Nicolas Beaudin, Defenceman, Drummondville Voltigeurs
- Jared McIsaac, Defenceman, Halifax Mooseheads
- Ivan Chekhovich, Forward, Baie-Comeau Drakkar
- Samuel Asselin, Forward, Halifax Mooseheads
- Jimmy Huntington, Forward, Rimouski Océanic

All-Rookie Team:

- Fabio Iacobo, Goaltender, Victoriaville Tigres
- Jordan Spence, Defenceman, Moncton Wildcats
- Lukas Cormier, Defenceman, Charlottetown Islanders
- Hendrix Lapierre, Forward, Chicoutimi Saguenéens
- Egor Serdyuk, Forward, Victoriaville Tigres
- Mikhail Abramov, Forward, Victoriaville Tigres

== See also ==
- List of QMJHL seasons
- 2018 in ice hockey
- 2019 in ice hockey
- 2018–19 OHL season
- 2018–19 WHL season
- 2019 Memorial Cup

Preceded by 2017–18 QMJHL season	QMJHL seasons	Succeeded by 2019–20 QMJHL season
