= Dmitry Zavgorodniy =

Russian ice hockey player

- Born: 11 August 2000 (age 25) Omsk, Russia
- Height: 5 ft 9 in (175 cm)
- Weight: 174 lb (79 kg; 12 st 6 lb)
- Position: Centre
- Shoots: Right
- KHL team Former teams: Admiral Vladivostok; SKA Saint Petersburg; HC Sochi
- NHL draft: 198th overall, 2018; Calgary Flames
- Playing career: 2020–present

Dmitry Zavgorodniy (also spelt Dmitri; born 11 August 2000) is a Russian professional ice hockey centre who is currently playing with Admiral Vladivostok in the Kontinental Hockey League (KHL).

== Playing career ==
Zavgorodniy was born on 11 August 2000 in Omsk, Russia. Following his single season with Omskie Yastreby in the MHL, Zavgorodny joined the Rimouski Océanic of the Quebec Major Junior Hockey League (QMJHL). During his draft season, Zavgorodniy was ranked 69th overall amongst all North American skaters by the NHL Central Scouting Bureau. He was eventually drafted 198th overall by the Calgary Flames in the 2018 NHL entry draft and signed a three-year entry-level contract after recording 28 goals and 36 assists for 64 points in 67 games during the 2018–19 regular season. In his final major junior season, Zavgorodniy was named a finalist for the Frank J. Selke Memorial Trophy as the league's most sportsmanlike player.

During the COVID-19 pandemic, Zavgorodniy was loaned to SKA Saint Petersburg in the Kontinental Hockey League. Upon returning to North America, Zavgorodniy joined the Flames' American Hockey League (AHL) affiliate, the Stockton Heat.

In the following 2021–22 season, Zavgorodniy continued with the Heat, going scoreless in 6 games before he was loaned by the Flames back to the KHL in joining HC Sochi, on 6 December 2021. He made 10 appearances with Sochi in the remainder of the regular season, collecting 3 assists, before he returned to North America to re-join the Stockton Heat on 25 February 2022. While not featuring during the playoffs with the Heat, Zavgorodniy was placed on unconditional waivers by the Flames and subsequently mutually terminated the remaining year on his contract with the Flames on 28 May 2022.

On 12 June 2022, Zavgorodniy returned to Russia and rejoined KHL club, HC Sochi, in agreeing to a two-year contract.

During the 2023–24 season, his final season under contract with Sochi, Zavgorodniy posted 3 goals and 7 points in 24 games before he was traded to Admiral Vladivostok, alongside Kirill Petkov in exchange for Nikolai Chebykin on 4 December 2023.

== Career statistics ==
=== Regular season and playoffs ===
			Regular season					Playoffs
Season	Team	League	GP	G	A	Pts	PIM	GP	G	A	Pts	PIM
2016–17	Omskie Yastreby	MHL	15	5	7	12	4	—	—	—	—	—
2017–18	Rimouski Océanic	QMJHL	62	26	21	47	8	7	1	2	3	0
2018–19	Rimouski Océanic	QMJHL	67	28	36	64	14	12	4	4	8	2
2019–20	Rimouski Océanic	QMJHL	40	29	38	67	6	—	—	—	—	—
2020–21	SKA Saint Petersburg	KHL	6	0	3	3	0	—	—	—	—	—
2020–21	Stockton Heat	AHL	29	1	3	4	2	—	—	—	—	—
2021–22	Stockton Heat	AHL	12	0	1	1	4	—	—	—	—	—
2021–22	HC Sochi	KHL	10	0	3	3	0	—	—	—	—	—
2022–23	HC Sochi	KHL	58	11	8	19	16	—	—	—	—	—
2023–24	HC Sochi	KHL	24	3	4	7	0	—	—	—	—	—
2023–24	Admiral Vladivostok	KHL	31	5	10	15	6	—	—	—	—	—
2024–25	Admiral Vladivostok	KHL	66	9	19	28	4	6	0	3	3	4
2025–26	Admiral Vladivostok	KHL	67	16	16	32	14	—	—	—	—	—
KHL totals			262	44	63	107	40	6	0	3	3	4

=== International ===
Year	Team	Event	Result	GP	G	A	Pts	PIM
2017	Russia	IH18	4th	5	5	5	10	0
2018	Russia	U18	6th	5	1	0	1	2
Junior totals				10	6	5	11	2
