= Rémi Poirier =

Canadian ice hockey player (born 2001)

- Born: October 6, 2001 (age 25) Farnham, Quebec, Canada
- Height: 6 ft 3 in (191 cm)
- Weight: 211 lb (96 kg; 15 st 1 lb)
- Position: Goaltender
- Catches: Left
- NHL team: Dallas Stars
- NHL draft: 185th overall, 2020; Dallas Stars
- Playing career: 2022–present

Rémi Poirier (born October 6, 2001) is a Canadian professional ice hockey player who is a goaltender for the Dallas Stars of the National Hockey League (NHL).

== Playing career ==
Poirier was drafted with the 185th overall pick by the Dallas Stars in the 2020 NHL entry draft. He was signed to a three-year, entry-level contract by Dallas in March 2022 in 2022–23. Poirier spent the majority of next three seasons in the American Hockey League (AHL) with the Texas Stars, the AHL affiliate of Dallas, before being re-signed to a two-year, two-way contract on June 16, 2025.

Poirier spent the 2025–26 season with Texas in the AHL and was projected to keep the starting goaltender role, but was put and then claimed off waivers by the New Jersey Devils on September 27, 2026. He did not appear in a game for New Jersey and on November 1, he was traded to the Washington Capitals in exchange for a 2027 seventh-round pick. However, on November 8, the Capitals placed Poirier on waivers again; he was subsequently re-claimed by Dallas the following day.

== Career statistics ==
			Regular season									Playoffs
Season	Team	League	GP	W	L	OTL	MIN	GA	SO	GAA	SV%	GP	W	L	MIN	GA	SO	GAA	SV%
2016–17	Magog Cantonniers	QMAAA	19	9	9	1	—	—	0	3.17	.901	3	0	3	—	—	0	4.01	.830
2017–18	Magog Cantonniers	QMAAA	19	13	4	2	—	—	1	2.75	.903	18	14	4	—	—	1	2.11	.917
2018–19	Gatineau Olympiques	QMJHL	19	7	9	0	1079	68	0	3.78	.890	5	1	4	299	22	0	4.42	.902
2019–20	Gatineau Olympiques	QMJHL	45	19	22	3	2,527	147	4	3.49	.900	—	—	—	—	—	—	—	—
2020–21	Gatineau Olympiques	QMJHL	24	14	8	2	1,458	64	2	2.63	.908	4	1	3	218	16	0	4.40	.873
2021–22	Gatineau Olympiques	QMJHL	37	22	7	6	2,157	89	1	2.48	.907	7	3	4	443	19	0	2.58	.898
2022–23	Idaho Steelheads	ECHL	23	19	2	2	1,390	48	3	2.07	.928	2	0	2	117	5	0	2.56	.919
2022–23	Texas Stars	AHL	16	9	5	2	920	42	0	2.74	.907	1	0	0	37	0	0	0.00	1.000
2023–24	Texas Stars	AHL	38	17	16	4	2,217	118	1	3.19	.904	7	4	3	369	16	1	2.60	.907
2024–25	Texas Stars	AHL	31	17	11	2	1,801	75	3	2.50	.908	10	5	3	576	21	1	2.19	.919
2025–26	Texas Stars	AHL	52	27	19	6	3,017	131	2	2.61	.912	5	2	3	308	15	1	2.92	.883
AHL totals			137	70	51	14	7,955	366	6	2.76	.908	23	11	9	1,290	52	3	2.42	.909
