= Tyce Thompson =

American ice hockey player (born 1999)

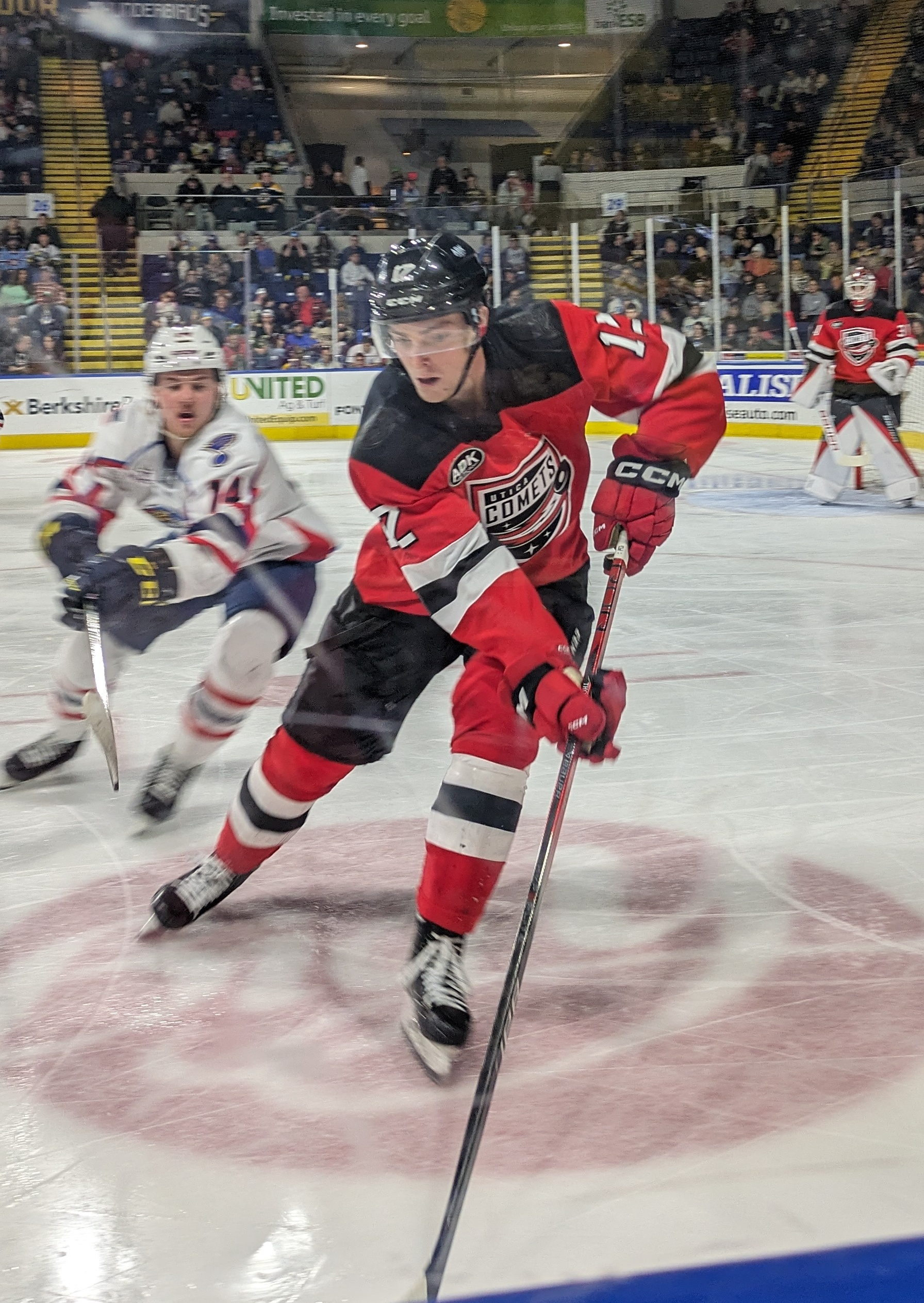
- Thompson (right) with the Utica Comets in 2023
- Born: July 12, 1999 (age 27) Oyster Bay, New York, U.S. (Note: Although many sources mistakenly list Calgary, Alberta as his birthplace)
- Height: 6 ft 1 in (185 cm)
- Weight: 194 lb (88 kg; 13 st 12 lb)
- Position: Center
- Shoots: Right
- KHL team Former teams: Barys Astana; New Jersey Devils
- NHL draft: 96th overall, 2019; New Jersey Devils
- Playing career: 2021–present

Tyce Thompson (born July 12, 1999) is an American professional ice hockey center for Barys Astana of the Kontinental Hockey League (KHL). He was selected 96th overall, in the fourth round of the 2019 NHL entry draft by the New Jersey Devils, and his rights were traded to the NHL's New York Islanders in November 2023.

== Playing career ==
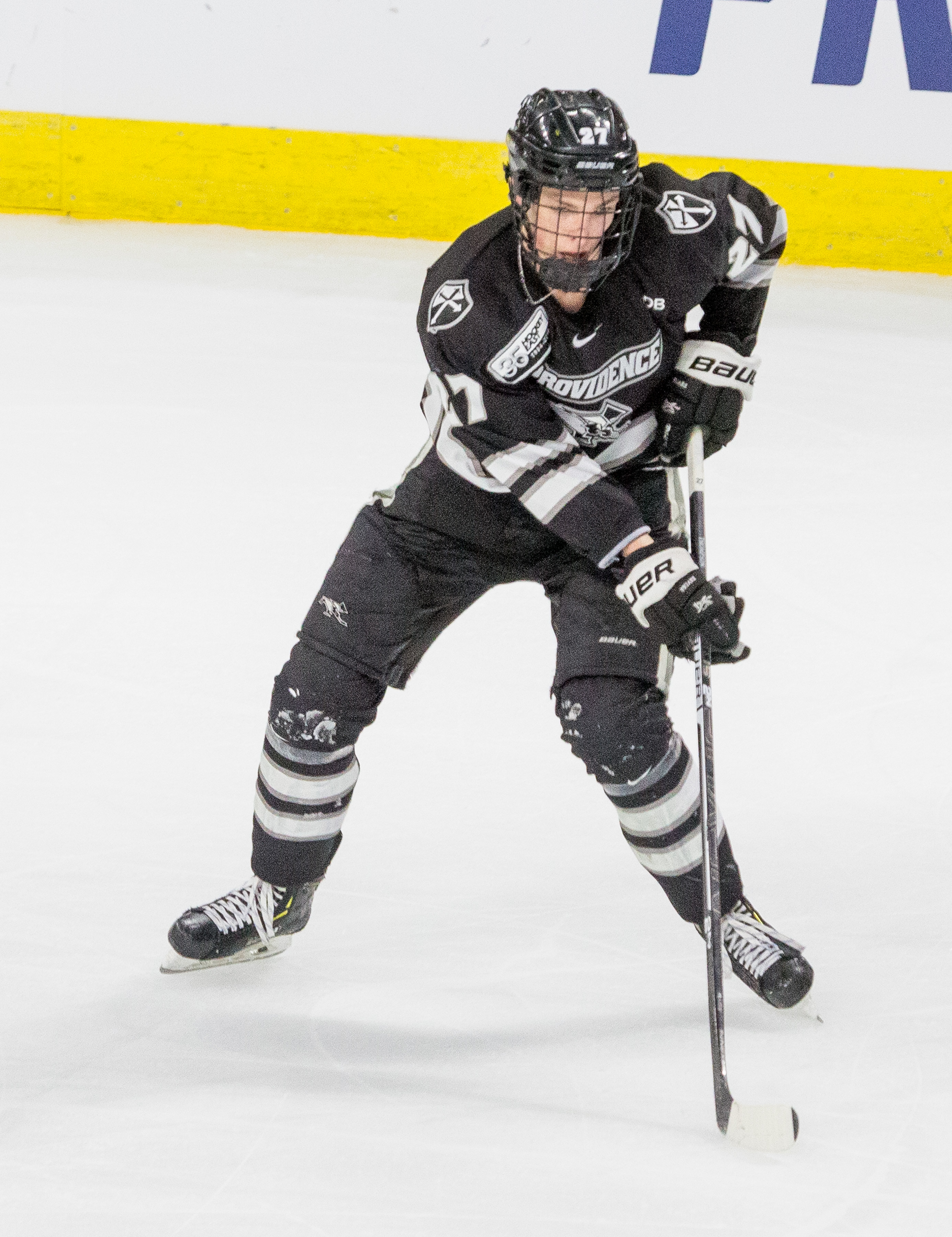
With Providence College in 2019

Tyce Thompson attended the Salisbury School and won two New England Championships. He then played hockey at Providence College. Thompson was drafted by the New Jersey Devils in the 4th round (96th overall) in the 2019 NHL entry draft.

On March 24, 2021, Thompson concluded his collegiate career after his junior season and signed his first professional deal, and was immediately added to the Devils roster on a two-year, entry-level contract. On April 6, Thompson made his professional and NHL debut, playing against his brother Tage, to register his first career assist and point in a 5–3 loss to the Buffalo Sabres. He played seven games in the NHL, spending most of his first short post-college 2020–21 season with the Devils' farm team, the Binghamton Devils in the American Hockey League (AHL).

For the majority of the 2021–22 and 2022–23 seasons, Thompson remained in the AHL, playing for the relocated Utica Comets; he appeared in two games, each season, with the Devils. He did not play any NHL games in the 2023–24 season, during which he was traded to the New York Islanders on November 26, 2023, in exchange for Arnaud Durandeau. The Islanders immediately assigned him to their AHL farm team, the Bridgeport Islanders, where he played out the 2024–25 AHL season.

Leaving the Islanders organization following two seasons, Thompson opted to sign his first contract abroad in agreeing to a one-year contract with Kazakhstani-based club, Barys Astana of the KHL, on August 20, 2025.

== Personal life ==
His father is Canadian former NHL player Brent Thompson, who serves as an assistant coach for the Anaheim Ducks. His brother Tage Thompson plays in the NHL with the Buffalo Sabres.

== Career statistics ==
			Regular season					Playoffs
Season	Team	League	GP	G	A	Pts	PIM	GP	G	A	Pts	PIM
2015–16	Salisbury School	USHS	26	5	11	16	—	—	—	—	—	—
2016–17	Salisbury School	USHS	20	7	18	25	—	—	—	—	—	—
2016–17	Dubuque Fighting Saints	USHL	3	0	0	0	2	2	0	0	0	2
2017–18	Dubuque Fighting Saints	USHL	60	12	20	32	48	5	1	0	1	2
2018–19	Providence College	HE	42	8	17	25	20	—	—	—	—	—
2019–20	Providence College	HE	34	19	25	44	29	—	—	—	—	—
2020–21	Providence College	HE	25	11	14	25	16	—	—	—	—	—
2020–21	New Jersey Devils	NHL	7	0	1	1	0	—	—	—	—	—
2020–21	Binghamton Devils	AHL	11	2	2	4	18	—	—	—	—	—
2021–22	Utica Comets	AHL	16	6	9	15	16	5	1	1	2	4
2021–22	New Jersey Devils	NHL	2	0	0	0	0	—	—	—	—	—
2022–23	Utica Comets	AHL	56	7	19	26	32	6	0	2	2	4
2022–23	New Jersey Devils	NHL	2	0	0	0	0	—	—	—	—	—
2023–24	Utica Comets	AHL	15	0	5	5	12	—	—	—	—	—
2023–24	Bridgeport Islanders	AHL	51	3	11	14	54	—	—	—	—	—
2024–25	Bridgeport Islanders	AHL	65	8	13	21	102	—	—	—	—	—
2025–26	Barys Astana	KHL	57	15	10	25	41	—	—	—	—	—
NHL totals			11	0	1	1	0	—	—	—	—	—
KHL totals			57	15	10	25	41	—	—	—	—	—

== Awards and honors ==
Award	Year	Ref
USHS
West Second Team All-New England	2017	
College
HE Second All-Star Team	2020, 2021	
All-USCHO Second Team	2020	
