= Alexis Gravel =

Canadian ice hockey player (born 2000)

- Born: March 21, 2000 (age 26) Berlin, Germany
- Height: 6 ft 3 in (191 cm)
- Weight: 219 lb (99 kg; 15 st 9 lb)
- Position: Goaltender
- Catches: Right
- Magnus team Former teams: Gothiques d'Amiens; Allen Americans; Orlando Solar Bears; Adler Mannheim; Belfast Giants; South Carolina Stingrays
- NHL draft: 162nd overall, 2018; Chicago Blackhawks
- Playing career: 2021–present

Alexis Gravel (born March 21, 2000) is a German-born French-Canadian professional ice hockey goaltender for Gothiques d'Amiens in the Ligue Magnus (France). Gravel previously played for Adler Mannheim in the Deutsche Eishockey Liga (DEL). He was selected in the sixth round, 162nd overall, by the Chicago Blackhawks in the 2018 NHL entry draft.

== Playing career ==
=== Junior ===
Before being drafted into major junior hockey, Gravel played two seasons for the Missasauga Senators of the Greater Toronto Hockey League (GTHL) and was selected 20th overall in the second round of the 2016 Quebec Major Junior Hockey League (QMJHL) Entry Draft by the Halifax Mooseheads.

Gravel began playing for the Mooseheads the following season, the 2016–17 season. In his first season with the team, he appeared in 50 games, posting 17 wins, 24 losses, and 3 overtime losses. Gravel would register one shutout along with a (.894) save percentage, and played six games in the playoffs for Halifax, whom were eliminated in the first round by the Rouyn-Noranda Huskies. Gravel was a nominee for the Raymond Lagacé Trophy, awarded to the QMJHL's best defensive rookie of the year.

In his second season with the Mooseheads, Gravel found himself starting in fewer games with a declining save percentage. He later admitted he was no longer enjoying the game, saying, "Mentally, I just wasn’t there. I think that screwed me a little bit." Despite this, he was selected 162nd overall by the Chicago Blackhawks in the 2018 NHL entry draft.

A summer of enhanced workouts, together with hands-on training with Blackhawks developmental goalie coach Peter Aubrey, helped to refocus Gravel's attention for the 2018–19 season. Starting in 49 games for the Mooseheads, he finished the regular season with 33 wins and a .913 save percentage, leading the team to first place in the league's Eastern Conference. In the QMJHL President Cup playoffs, Gravel backstopped the Mooseheads to its best finish in seven seasons, winning 14 of 23 games en route to a 4–2 series loss to Rouyn-Noranda in the league final.

The two teams would meet again in the final of the 2019 Memorial Cup, the national championship of the Canadian Hockey League (CHL), by virtue of Halifax's status as tournament host. While the Mooseheads would drop a 4–2 decision to the Huskies in the championship game, Gravel was awarded the Hap Emms Memorial Trophy as the tournament's best goalie, with a save percentage of .918 and a goals-against average of 2.78. Gravel was also named to the tournament all-star team.

=== Professional ===
Going unsigned by the Blackhawks, Gravel embarked on his professional career as a unrestricted free agent before agreeing to join the Allen Americans of the ECHL for the 2021–22 season on October 13, 2021.

=== University ===
Gravel attended the Université du Québec à Trois-Rivières (UQTR), and played for the UQTR Patriotes from 2021 to 2023. The Patriotes won the 2022 U Sports University Cup national championship, with Gravel winning the Major W.J. "Danny" McLeod Award as Most Valuable Player of the tournament – including his 66 save performance in the double overtime victory over the University of Alberta Golden Bears in the final.

=== Return to professional ===
Following three seasons with the Patriotes, Gravel resumed his professional career in returning to the ECHL with the Orlando Solar Bears for the 2024–25 season on July 29, 2024.

After a spell with the German side Adler Mannheim, Gravel agreed terms to join Elite Ice Hockey League side Belfast Giants in July 2025.

== International play ==
Medal record

Representing Canada

Ice hockey
Gold medal – first place	2017 Ivan Hlinka Memorial Tournament	

Gravel was born in Germany, but represents Canada in international competition. He was a goalie for Canada at the 2016 Winter Youth Olympics where he played in 4 games for Canada, earning a (.902) save percentage.

Gravel also competed for Canada men's national under-18 ice hockey team and was named to the 2017 Ivan Hlinka Memorial Tournament, a tournament not sanctioned by the International Ice Hockey Federation (IIHF), winning gold with Canada, defeating the Czech Republic 4–1. In his sole appearance for Canada at the tournament, Gravel posted a (.857) save percentage along with a (3.69) goals against average.

== Personal life ==
Gravel was born in Berlin, Germany but grew up in Asbestos, Quebec. He is the son of François, a former professional ice hockey goaltender who was selected in the third round, 87th overall, by the Montreal Canadiens in the 1987 NHL entry draft and represented France in the 1998 Winter Olympics.

Gravel began playing goaltender when he was around five years old in Italy, where his father played professionally for 12 years.

== Career statistics ==
=== Regular season and playoffs ===
			Regular season									Playoffs
Season	Team	League	GP	W	L	OT	MIN	GA	SO	GAA	SV%	GP	W	L	MIN	GA	SO	GAA	SV%
2016–17	Halifax Mooseheads	QMJHL	50	17	29	3	2628	147	1	3.36	.894	6	2	4	410	20	0	3.61	.924
2017–18	Halifax Mooseheads	QMJHL	39	20	16	2	2093	118	0	3.38	.890	8	4	4	467	21	1	2.70	.917
2018–19	Halifax Mooseheads	QMJHL	49	33	13	2	2870	119	5	2.49	.913	23	14	8	1408	64	0	2.73	.917
2019–20	Halifax Mooseheads	QMJHL	40	12	23	3	2198	145	1	3.96	.893	—	—	—	—	—	—	—	—
2020–21	Halifax Mooseheads	QMJHL	20	7	8	4	1123	73	0	3.90	.887	—	—	—	—	—	—	—	—
2021–22	Allen Americans	ECHL	2	1	1	0	120	10	0	5.00	.863	—	—	—	—	—	—	—	—
2021–22	UQTR Patriotes	OUA	11	8	3	0	670	23	1	2.06	.924	7	7	0	—	—	1	1.55	—
2022–23	UQTR Patriotes	OUA	19	15	2	1	1067	36	4	2.02	.932	6	5	1	—	—	1	2.52	9.29
2023–24	UQTR Patriotes	OUA	23	15	6	0	1250	39	3	1.87	.935	7	5	2	—	—	2	1.60	9.42
2024–25	Orlando Solar Bears	ECHL	23	10	7	5	1357	55	2	2.43	.927	—	—	—	—	—	—	—	—
2024–25	Adler Mannheim	DEL	2	1	0	0	82	4	0	2.94	.857	—	—	—	—	—	—	—	—
2025–26	Belfast Giants	EIHL	11	6	5	0	637	26	1	2.45	.906	—	—	—	—	—	—	—	—
2025–26	South Carolina Stingrays	ECHL	8	3	3	2	449	29	0	3.87	.879	—	—	—	—	—	—	—	—
QMJHL totals			198	89	89	14	10,913	602	7	3.31	.897	37	20	16	2,285	105	1	2.76	.918
