= Julien Gauthier =

Canadian ice hockey player (born 1997)

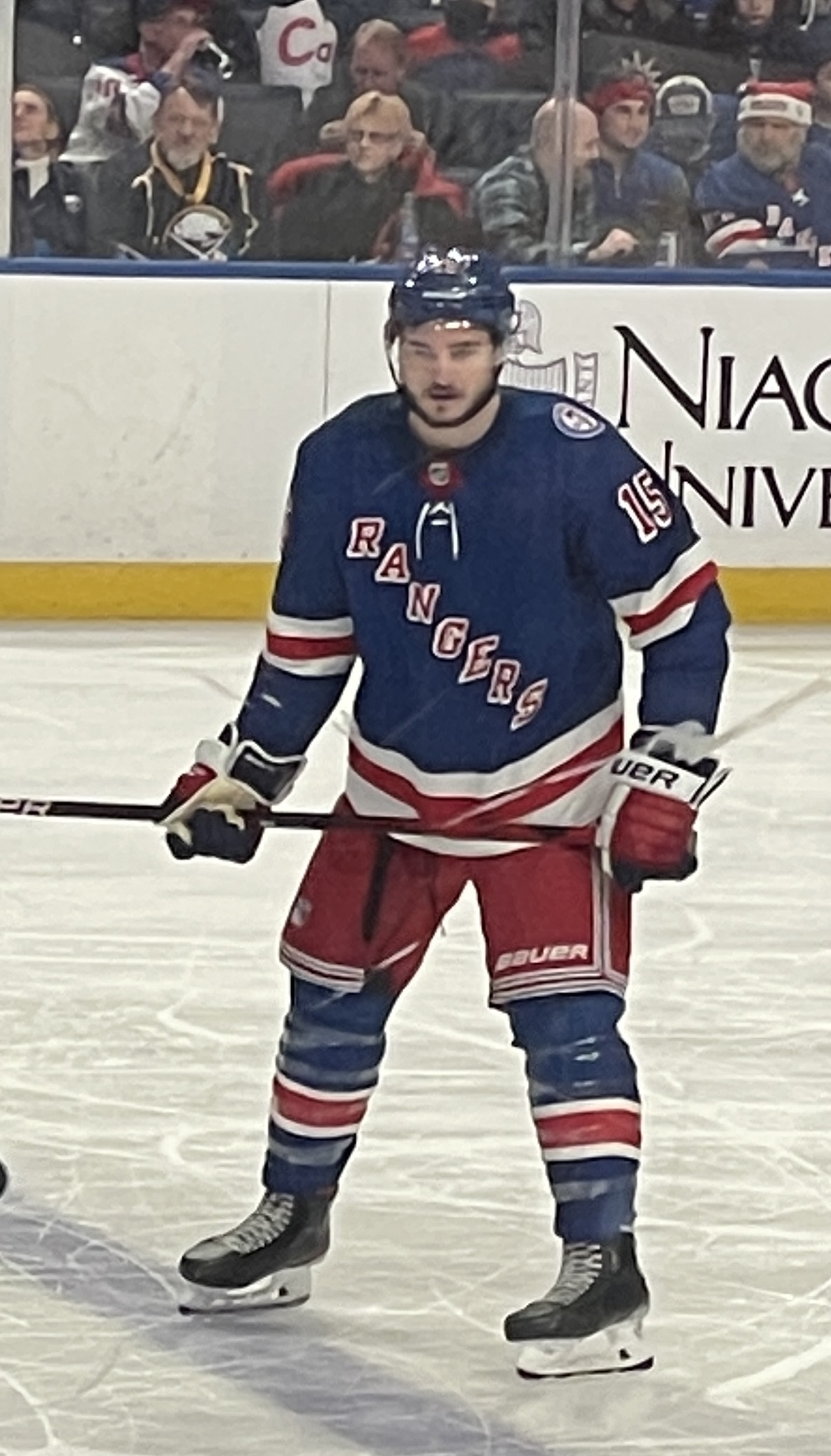
- Gauthier with the New York Rangers in 2021
- Born: October 15, 1997 (age 28) Pointe-aux-Trembles, Quebec, Canada
- Height: 6 ft 4 in (193 cm)
- Weight: 230 lb (104 kg; 16 st 6 lb)
- Position: Winger
- Shoots: Right
- SHL team Former teams: Brynäs IF; Carolina Hurricanes; New York Rangers; Ottawa Senators; New York Islanders
- NHL draft: 21st overall, 2016; Carolina Hurricanes
- Playing career: 2017–present

Julien Gauthier (born October 15, 1997) is a Canadian professional ice hockey winger for Brynäs IF of the Swedish Hockey League (SHL). Gauthier was selected 21st overall by the National Hockey League (NHL)'s Carolina Hurricanes in the 2016 NHL entry draft. He has previously played in the NHL for the Hurricanes, New York Rangers, Ottawa Senators, and New York Islanders.

== Playing career ==
=== Amateur ===
Gauthier was selected by Val-d'Or Foreurs of the Quebec Major Junior Hockey League (QMJHL) in the first round, sixth overall, of the 2013 QMJHL entry draft. He played with Val-d'Or from the 2013–14 season to the 2016–17 season. In his first season with Val-d'Or in 2013–14, Gauthier recorded nine goals and 21 assists for 30 points in 62 games. The Foreurs advanced to the league championship, beating the Baie Comeau Drakkar to take the President's Cup. In 24 playoff games, Gauthier recorded seven assists. As league champions the Foreurs advanced to the 2014 Memorial Cup where they faced the host team and the two other league champions from across the Canadian Hockey League, namely the Edmonton Oil Kings of the Western Hockey League (WHL), the Guelph Storm of the Ontario Hockey League (OHL) and the host London Knights. The Foreurs advanced to the round-robin tournament's semifinal against the Oil Kings, taking part in the longest Memorial Cup game to date, going to triple overtime before. Ultimately, the Foreurs lost after Curtis Lazar of the Oil Kings scored in the third overtime.

He returned to Val-d'Or for the 2014–15 season, Gauthier reached new scoring highs, recording 38 goals and 73 points in 68 games. In the playoffs the Foreurs made it to the third round before running into the Rimouski Océanic, who swept them in four games in their best-of-seven series. In 17 playoffs games, Gauthier added five goals and ten points. For the 2015–16 season, he played in 54 games, notching 41 goals and 57 points. In the playoffs, the Foreurs drew the Blainville-Boisbriand Armada in the first round and were eliminated based on the play of Armada goaltender Sam Montembeault, who limited Val d-Or's offence. In six playoff games, he tallied two goals and five points.

In the 2016–17 season, his fourth season with the Foreurs, Gauthier registered 27 points in 23 games before he was traded to contending team, the Saint John Sea Dogs, in exchange for future draft picks and Nathan Cyr-Trottier on January 6, 2017. He played with future NHL teammates Thomas Chabot and Mathieu Joseph with the Sea Dogs. In 20 games with the Sea Dogs, he recorded ten goals and 24 points. The Sea Dogs advanced to the league championship where they beat the Armada to claim the President's Cup. They qualified for the 2017 Memorial Cup as league champions. They advanced to the semifinal after eliminating the WHL's Seattle Thunderbirds, but were knocked out by the OHL's Erie Otters.

=== Professional ===
==== Carolina Hurricanes ====
Gauthier was selected by the Carolina Hurricanes of the National Hockey League (NHL) in the first round, 21st overall, of the 2016 NHL entry draft. On July 9, 2016, Gauthier was signed to his first NHL deal, agreeing to a three-year, entry-level contract with the Hurricanes. He attended Carolina's training camp prior to the 2017–18 season and was assigned to the Charlotte Checkers, the American Hockey League (AHL) affiliate of the Hurricanes. In 65 games with Charlotte, he recorded 16 goals and 25 points. The Checkers finished third in the Atlantic Division and qualified for the playoffs. They made it to the second round where they knocked out of contention by the Lehigh Valley Phantoms. In eight playoff games, Gauthier scored one goal and two points. He returned to Charlotte for the 2018–19 season and put up 27 goals in 41 points in 75 games. The Checkers qualified for the 2019 playoffs and advanced to the final where they faced the Chicago Wolves to win the Calder Cup.

He began the 2019–20 season with Charlotte, but he was recalled on October 9, 2019 by Carolina. He made his NHL debut on October 11 in a 5–2 victory over the New York Islanders. After appearing in two games, he was returned to Charlotte. He was recalled again in December He recorded his first NHL point assisting on Brock McGinn's goal in a 4–0 victory over the Calgary Flames in his fifth game. He was returned to Charlotte where he 26 tallied goals and 37 points in 44 games.

==== New York Rangers ====
During the 2019–20 season, on February 18, 2020, Gauthier was traded by the Hurricanes to the New York Rangers in exchange for defenceman Joey Keane. He made his Rangers debut on February 19 in a 6–3 win over the Chicago Blackhawks. He marked his first point with New York on February 27 when he assisted on Mika Zibanejad's second period goal in a 5–2 victory over the Montreal Canadiens. He made twelve appearances for the Rangers, marking two assists, before the season was suspended on March 12 due to the COVID-19 pandemic. When play resumed for the 2020 Stanley Cup playoffs in August, the Rangers faced the Hurricanes in the qualifying round. Gauthier made his NHL playoff debut on August 1 in Game 1 of the best-of-five-game series. The Hurricanes swept the Rangers in three games. Gauthier went scoreless in the series.

Going into his first full season with the Rangers in the pandemic-shortened 2020–21 season, head coach David Quinn placed him on the third line before he was dropped to the fourth line alongside Kevin Rooney and Brendan Lemieux. On February 10, 2021, Gauthier scored his first career NHL goal against the Boston Bruins. He finished the season with two goals and eight points in 30 appearances. A restricted free agent in the offseason, he signed a one-year contract with the Rangers in July.

He began the 2021–22 season with the Rangers. However, after the March trade deadline, he made only three appearances and did not play in any of the Rangers' playoff games. In 49 games with New York, he scored three goals and seven points. In the offseason he demanded a trade after becoming upset with his playing time, but none was forthcoming. Gauthier cleared waivers and was assigned to New York's AHL affiliate, the Hartford Wolf Pack, prior to the start of the 2022–23 season. On October 26, 2022, Gauthier was recalled by the Rangers after making four appearances with Hartford, tallying two goals. The Rangers carried Gauthier as the team's extra forward, but he eventually usurped Ryan Reaves on the fourth line, playing alongside Sammy Blais and Ryan Carpenter. He made 40 appearances with New York, scoring six goals and nine points.

==== Ottawa Senators ====
On February 19, 2023, Gauthier was traded, along with a conditional draft pick in the 2023 NHL entry draft, to the Ottawa Senators for forward Tyler Motte. In his debut with the Senators he played on a line with Parker Kelly and Ridly Greig against the Boston Bruins on February 20. He scored his first goal with the Senators against Sam Montembeault on February 25 in a 5–2 win over the Montreal Canadiens. In 17 games with Ottawa, he marked three goals and five points.

==== New York Islanders ====
A restricted free agent the end of the season, Ottawa declined to give Gauthier a qualifying offer, making him an unrestricted free agent. Gauthier then signed a two-year, $1.575 million contract with the New York Islanders on July 5, 2023. He made his Islanders debut in the 2023–24 season against the Buffalo Sabres on October 21. He scored his first goal with the Islanders against Anthony Stolarz on December 2, in a 4–3 win over the Florida Panthers. After 27 games with the Islanders, having scored four goals and 11 points, Gauthier was placed on waivers on February 2, 2024. He went unclaimed and was assigned to the Islanders' AHL affiliate, the Bridgeport Islanders. He finished the season with Bridgeport, making 17 appearances, scoring seven goals and ten points.

He began the 2024–25 season with New York as the team's extra forward, replacing the injured Anthony Duclair on the roster. He made one appearance, going scoreless, on the fourth line before being placed on waivers in October. After going unclaimed, he was assigned to Bridgeport. He played in nine games, scoring three goals and eight points, before suffering an injury on November 24, 2024, that kept him out for the remainder of the season. He re-signed with the Islanders to a one-year, two-way contract on June 29, 2025. Gauthier cleared waivers and was assigned to Bridgeport to begin the 2025–26 season. In 14 games with Bridgeport, he put up five goals and seven points.

==== St. Louis Blues ====
On February 24, 2026, Gauthier was traded to the St. Louis Blues in exchange for forward Matt Luff. He was immediately assigned to St. Louis' AHL affiliate, the Springfield Thunderbirds. In eleven games with the Thunderbirds, he scored two goals and five points. The Thunderbirds qualified for the 2026 Calder Cup playoffs and on On April 25, Gauthier scored the game winning goal in overtime to eliminate the Charlotte Checkers in Game 3 of the Atlantic Division Quarterfinals. The team advanced to the Atlantic Division final, where they were eliminated by the Wilkes-Barre/Scranton Penguins. Gauthier finished the playoffs with two goals in seven games.

==== Brynäs IF ====
As a free agent from the Blues, Gauthier agreed to a one-year contract with Brynäs IF of the Swedish Hockey League, on July 21, 2026.

== International play ==
Medal record

Representing Canada

Ice hockey

World Junior Championships
Silver medal – second place	2017 Canada	

On December 1, 2015, Gauthier was invited to the Team Canada selection camp for the 2016 World Junior Hockey Championships. He was the only draft-eligible player to end up participating in the tournament for Canada. However, the team finished sixth in the tournament.

Gauthier was again invited to Team Canada's selection camp for the 2017 World Junior Hockey Championships. He was one of five players from the 2016 team to be named to the 2017 team. He scored two goals, including the game winner, in a 5–3 win over the Czech Republic in the quarterfinals. In the semifinals, Gauthier scored twice more, including the game winner, in a 5–2 win over Sweden. However, Canada was defeated by Team USA in the final to take the silver medal.

== Personal life ==
He is the nephew of former NHL player Denis Gauthier. His father and grandfather were bodybuilders who each at one point won the title of "Mr. Canada," while his grandmother was a member of the famous Rougeau Family of professional wrestlers.

== Career statistics ==
=== Regular season and playoffs ===
			Regular season					Playoffs
Season	Team	League	GP	G	A	Pts	PIM	GP	G	A	Pts	PIM
2013–14	Val-d'Or Foreurs	QMJHL	62	8	21	29	19	24	0	7	7	2
2014–15	Val-d'Or Foreurs	QMJHL	68	38	35	73	46	17	5	5	10	6
2015–16	Val-d'Or Foreurs	QMJHL	54	41	16	57	24	6	2	3	5	8
2016–17	Val-d'Or Foreurs	QMJHL	23	7	20	27	22	—	—	—	—	—
2016–17	Saint John Sea Dogs	QMJHL	20	10	14	24	18	16	11	6	17	13
2017–18	Charlotte Checkers	AHL	65	16	9	25	24	8	1	1	2	2
2018–19	Charlotte Checkers	AHL	75	27	14	41	57	17	5	3	8	10
2019–20	Charlotte Checkers	AHL	44	26	11	37	34	—	—	—	—	—
2019–20	Carolina Hurricanes	NHL	5	0	1	1	6	—	—	—	—	—
2019–20	New York Rangers	NHL	12	0	2	2	2	3	0	0	0	0
2020–21	New York Rangers	NHL	30	2	6	8	14	—	—	—	—	—
2021–22	New York Rangers	NHL	49	3	4	7	8	—	—	—	—	—
2022–23	New York Rangers	NHL	40	6	3	9	4	—	—	—	—	—
2022–23	Hartford Wolf Pack	AHL	4	2	0	2	2	—	—	—	—	—
2022–23	Ottawa Senators	NHL	17	3	2	5	2	—	—	—	—	—
2023–24	New York Islanders	NHL	27	5	4	9	8	—	—	—	—	—
2023–24	Bridgeport Islanders	AHL	17	7	3	10	2	—	—	—	—	—
2024–25	New York Islanders	NHL	1	0	0	0	0	—	—	—	—	—
2024–25	Bridgeport Islanders	AHL	9	3	5	8	6	—	—	—	—	—
2025–26	Bridgeport Islanders	AHL	14	5	2	7	6	—	—	—	—	—
2025–26	Springfield Thunderbirds	AHL	11	2	3	5	4	7	2	0	2	10
NHL totals			181	19	22	41	44	3	0	0	0	0

=== International ===
Year	Team	Event	Result	GP	G	A	Pts	PIM
2014	Canada Québec	U17	4th	6	0	0	0	4
2016	Canada	WJC	6th	5	0	2	2	0
2017	Canada	WJC	2nd place, silver medalist(s)	7	5	2	7	2
Junior totals				18	5	4	9	6

== Awards and honours ==
Award	Year
QMJHL
President's Cup	2014, 2017
AHL
Calder Cup	2019

== Bibliography ==
- Chaimovitch, Jason, ed. (2025). 2025–2026 American Hockey League Official Guide & Record Book. Springfield, Massachusetts: American Hockey League. OCLC 22147888.

Awards and achievements
Preceded by Jake Bean	Carolina Hurricanes first-round draft pick 2016	Succeeded by Martin Nečas
