= Bokondji Imama =

Canadian ice hockey player (born 1996)

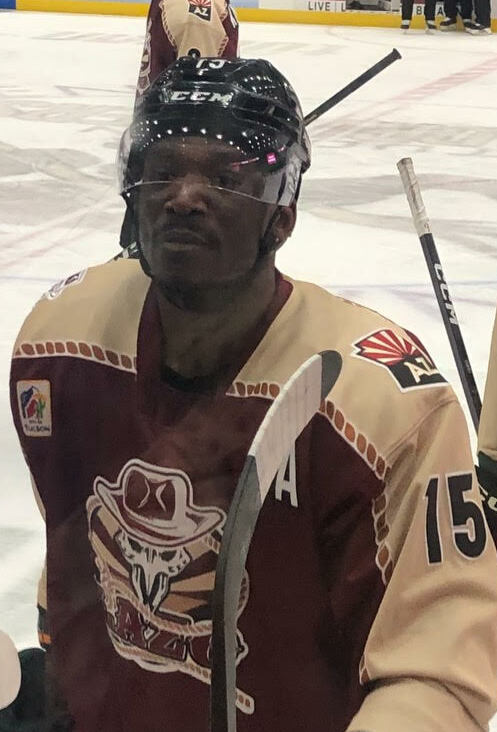
- Imama with the Tucson Roadrunners in 2023
- Born: August 3, 1996 (age 30) Montreal, Quebec, Canada
- Height: 6 ft 1 in (185 cm)
- Weight: 222 lb (101 kg; 15 st 12 lb)
- Position: Left wing
- Shoots: Left
- NHL team Former teams: Florida Panthers; Arizona Coyotes; Ottawa Senators; Pittsburgh Penguins
- NHL draft: 180th overall, 2015; Tampa Bay Lightning
- Playing career: 2017–present

Bokondji "Boko" Imama (born August 3, 1996) is a Canadian professional ice hockey left winger for the Florida Panthers of the National Hockey League (NHL). He has previously played for the Arizona Coyotes, Ottawa Senators, and the Pittsburgh Penguins.

== Playing career ==
=== Junior ===
The Baie-Comeau Drakkar of the Quebec Major Junior Hockey League selected Imama in the fourth round of the 2012 QMJHL entry draft. Imama joined the Drakkar for the 2012–13 QMJHL season. Noted for his physicality, Imama spent parts of three seasons with the Drakkar before being traded to the Saint John Sea Dogs in 2014–15.

In December 2015, the QMJHL suspended Imama for 15 games after he came off the Sea Dogs' bench to defend 15-year-old teammate Joe Veleno during a brawl against the Halifax Mooseheads. Imama finished the 2015–16 season with 19 points in 48 games. The following year, Imama led the Sea Dogs and finished seventh in the QMJHL with 41 goals in 66 games. He added 15 points in 18 games during the 2017 QMJHL playoffs as the Sea Dogs won the President's Cup; and advanced to the Memorial Cup. In four games with Saint John at the 2017 Memorial Cup, Imama scored one goal and added two assists. The Sea Dogs made the Cup semi-final but were eliminated by the Erie Otters.

=== Professional ===
The Tampa Bay Lightning of the National Hockey League (NHL) selected Imama in the sixth round of the 2015 NHL entry draft. On May 31, 2017, after failing to agree on a contract with Imama, the Lightning traded him to the Los Angeles Kings in exchange for a conditional seventh-round pick in the 2017 NHL entry draft. Imama signed a three-year entry-level contract with the Kings the following day. Save for a brief stint with the ECHL's Manchester Monarchs in 2018–19, Imama spent the first four seasons of his professional career with the Kings' American Hockey League (AHL) affiliate, the Ontario Reign. During the 2019–20 season, Imama was the target of a racist taunt by Bakersfield Condors defenceman Brandon Manning, resulting in a five-game suspension for Manning. On February 7, 2020, Imama and Manning faced each other in a game for the first time since the incident and fought early in the first period; Imama later added a goal and an assist to complete a Gordie Howe hat trick (and was named the game's third star) in what was ultimately a 10–3 Reign win.

On July 24, 2021, the Kings traded Imama and defenceman Cole Hults to the Arizona Coyotes in exchange for forwards Tyler Steenbergen and Brayden Burke. During his first season with the Coyotes' AHL affiliate, the Tucson Roadrunners, Imama was the target of a racist gesture by San Jose Barracuda forward Krystof Hrabik in a game on January 12, 2022. Later that month, the AHL suspended Hrabik for 30 games.

The Coyotes recalled Imama from the Roadrunners on April 22, 2022. He made his NHL debut that night against the Washington Capitals; the following day, Imama scored his first NHL goal against St. Louis Blues goaltender Jordan Binnington in a 5–4 Coyotes overtime loss. He played in four games with Arizona. Imama was assigned to Tucson to start the 2022–23 season. Imama played five games with Arizona in 2022–23.

As an unrestricted free agent from the Coyotes, Imama was signed to a one-year, two-way contract with the Ottawa Senators on the opening day of free agency on July 1, 2023. Imama attended Ottawa's 2023 training camp, but failed to make the team. He was placed on waivers and after going unclaimed, assigned to Ottawa's AHL affiliate, the Belleville Senators to start the 2023–24 season. He registered ten points in 53 games with Belleville. Imama was suspended by the AHL on January 13, 2024 for three games due to events in a game versus the Toronto Marlies on January 12. Imama was recalled by Ottawa on April 6. He made his debut for Ottawa that night in a 4–3 loss to the New Jersey Devils, fighting Kurtis MacDermid in the first period. He appeared in six games with Ottawa, going scoreless.

Bokondji Imama with the Florida Panthers in November 2026

After a lone season within the Senators organization, Imama left as an unrestricted free agent and was signed to a one-year, two-way contract with the Pittsburgh Penguins on July 1, 2024. He went unclaimed on waivers, and was assigned to Pittsburgh's AHL affiliate, the Wilkes-Barre/Scranton Penguins, to start the 2024–25 season. He was recalled by Pittsburgh on January 25, 2025 after Bryan Rust suffered an injury. He made his Pittsburgh debut the following day on January 26, replacing Blake Lizotte in the lineup against the Seattle Kraken. In a game against the Philadelphia Flyers on February 28, he laid a controversial hit on Flyers' forward Garnet Hathaway that forced Hathaway from the game, but resulted in no serious injury. Flyers' coach John Totorella was irate after the match, questioning the referees' decision to award only a two-minute minor penalty. Imama had not intended to injure Hathaway, but had spotted the Flyer charging at his Penguins' teammate, Noel Acciari, and attempted to prevent him from hitting his target. He scored his first goal with the Penguins on March 22 against the Columbus Blue Jackets, after getting into a fight with Mathieu Olivier earlier in the match. In March, he underwent surgery on his biceps, ending his season. He made 24 appearances for Wilkes-Barre/Scranton, recording two goals and five points. In 16 games with Pittsburgh, he recorded the one goal.

He signed a one-year contract extension with Pittsburgh on June 13. He was placed on waivers and after going unclaimed, was assigned to Wilkes-Barre/Scranton to start the 2025–26 season. He was recalled on December 1 and made his Pittsburgh season debut that night against the Philadelphia Flyers. He made one more appearance before he was returned to the AHL on December 7.

As a free agent after two seasons with the Penguins, Imama was signed to a one-year, two-way contract with the Florida Panthers on July 1, 2026.

== Personal life ==
Imama was born in Montreal and has four sisters. His mother, Kumbia, and father, Bokondji, immigrated to Canada from the Democratic Republic of the Congo.

== Career statistics ==
			Regular season					Playoffs
Season	Team	League	GP	G	A	Pts	PIM	GP	G	A	Pts	PIM
2012–13	Baie-Comeau Drakkar	QMJHL	44	3	3	6	34	5	0	0	0	9
2013–14	Baie-Comeau Drakkar	QMJHL	59	7	8	15	101	14	0	4	4	14
2014–15	Baie-Comeau Drakkar	QMJHL	36	10	9	19	89	—	—	—	—	—
2014–15	Saint John Sea Dogs	QMJHL	23	3	6	9	48	5	0	1	1	6
2015–16	Saint John Sea Dogs	QMJHL	48	7	12	19	86	10	1	3	4	15
2016–17	Saint John Sea Dogs	QMJHL	66	41	14	55	105	18	8	7	15	22
2017–18	Ontario Reign	AHL	38	0	1	1	59	—	—	—	—	—
2018–19	Ontario Reign	AHL	34	3	3	6	71	—	—	—	—	—
2018–19	Manchester Monarchs	ECHL	13	1	5	6	37	10	3	2	5	6
2019–20	Ontario Reign	AHL	50	4	10	14	134	—	—	—	—	—
2020–21	Ontario Reign	AHL	31	9	5	14	56	1	0	0	0	10
2021–22	Tucson Roadrunners	AHL	54	5	7	12	178	—	—	—	—	—
2021–22	Arizona Coyotes	NHL	4	1	0	1	5	—	—	—	—	—
2022–23	Tucson Roadrunners	AHL	50	5	10	15	109	3	0	0	0	6
2022–23	Arizona Coyotes	NHL	5	0	0	0	5	—	—	—	—	—
2023–24	Belleville Senators	AHL	53	3	7	10	115	7	1	2	3	16
2023–24	Ottawa Senators	NHL	6	0	0	0	7	—	—	—	—	—
2024–25	Wilkes-Barre/Scranton Penguins	AHL	24	3	2	5	47	—	—	—	—	—
2024–25	Pittsburgh Penguins	NHL	16	1	0	1	30	—	—	—	—	—
2025–26	Wilkes-Barre/Scranton Penguins	AHL	66	6	5	11	137	6	0	1	1	18
2025–26	Pittsburgh Penguins	NHL	2	0	0	0	5	—	—	—	—	—
NHL totals			33	2	0	2	52	—	—	—	—	—
