= Dillon Boucher (ice hockey) =

Canadian ice hockey player (born 1997)

- Born: April 16, 1997 (age 29) Head of Chezzetcook, Nova Scotia, Canada
- Height: 6 ft 0 in (183 cm)
- Weight: 220 lb (100 kg; 15 st 10 lb)
- Position: Left wing
- Shoots: Left
- NHL team (P) Cur. team: Chicago Blackhawks; Rockford IceHogs (AHL)
- NHL draft: Undrafted
- Playing career: 2025–present

Dillon Boucher (born April 16, 1997) is a Canadian professional ice hockey player who is a left winger for the Rockford IceHogs of the American Hockey League (AHL) while under contract to the Chicago Blackhawks of the National Hockey League (NHL).

== Playing career ==
Before turning pro, Boucher played four seasons at Dalhousie University where he recorded 16 goals and 27 assists in 99 games. On March 6, 2023, he signed with the Wichita Thunder of the ECHL. He played two full seasons with the Thunder of the ECHL, and was named captain for the 2024–25 season. He recorded 14 goals, 21 assists, and 242 penalty minutes in 151 ECHL games.

On June 18, 2025, he signed a one-year contract with the Rockford IceHogs of the American Hockey League (AHL). He made his AHL debut for the IceHogs during the 2025–26 season and recorded three goals and five assist in 53 regular season games. He ranked third on the team with 114 penalty minutes. He scored his first career AHL goal on October 12, 2025, against the Iowa Wild. On January 12, 2026, he signed a one-year contract extension with the IceHogs through the 2026–27 season.

On July 2, 2026, he signed a one-year, two-way contract with the Chicago Blackhawks. On November 3, 2026, he was recalled by the Blackhawks. He made his NHL debut the next day against the Florida Panthers at 29 years old.

== Career statistics ==
=== Regular season and playoffs ===
			Regular season					Playoffs
Season	Team	League	GP	G	A	Pts	PIM	GP	G	A	Pts	PIM
2014–15	Cape Breton Screaming Eagles	QMJHL	40	3	7	10	59	7	2	0	2	13
2015–16	Cape Breton Screaming Eagles	QMJHL	64	10	5	15	79	13	1	0	1	10
2016–17	Cape Breton Screaming Eagles	QMJHL	31	3	5	8	46	—	—	—	—	—
2016–17	Charlottetown Islanders	QMJHL	25	1	3	4	21	11	4	0	4	12
2017–18	Miramichi Timberwolves	MHL	42	24	23	47	96	4	1	2	3	4
2018–19	Dalhousie University	AUS	30	4	7	11	22	—	—	—	—	—
2019–20	Dalhousie University	AUS	29	2	10	12	83	—	—	—	—	—
2020–21	Dalhousie University	AUS	0	0	0	0	0	—	—	—	—	—
2021–22	Dalhousie University	AUS	20	4	5	9	50	1	0	0	0	0
2022–23	Dalhousie University	AUS	20	6	5	11	57	—	—	—	—	—
2022–23	Wichita Thunder	ECHL	11	0	0	0	18	—	—	—	—	—
2023–24	Wichita Thunder	ECHL	70	8	14	22	96	—	—	—	—	—
2024–25	Wichita Thunder	ECHL	70	6	7	13	128	4	1	0	1	12
2025–26	Rockford IceHogs	AHL	53	3	5	8	114	—	—	—	—	—
AHL totals			53	3	5	8	114	—	—	—	—	—
