= Jérémy Lauzon =

Canadian ice hockey player (born 1997)

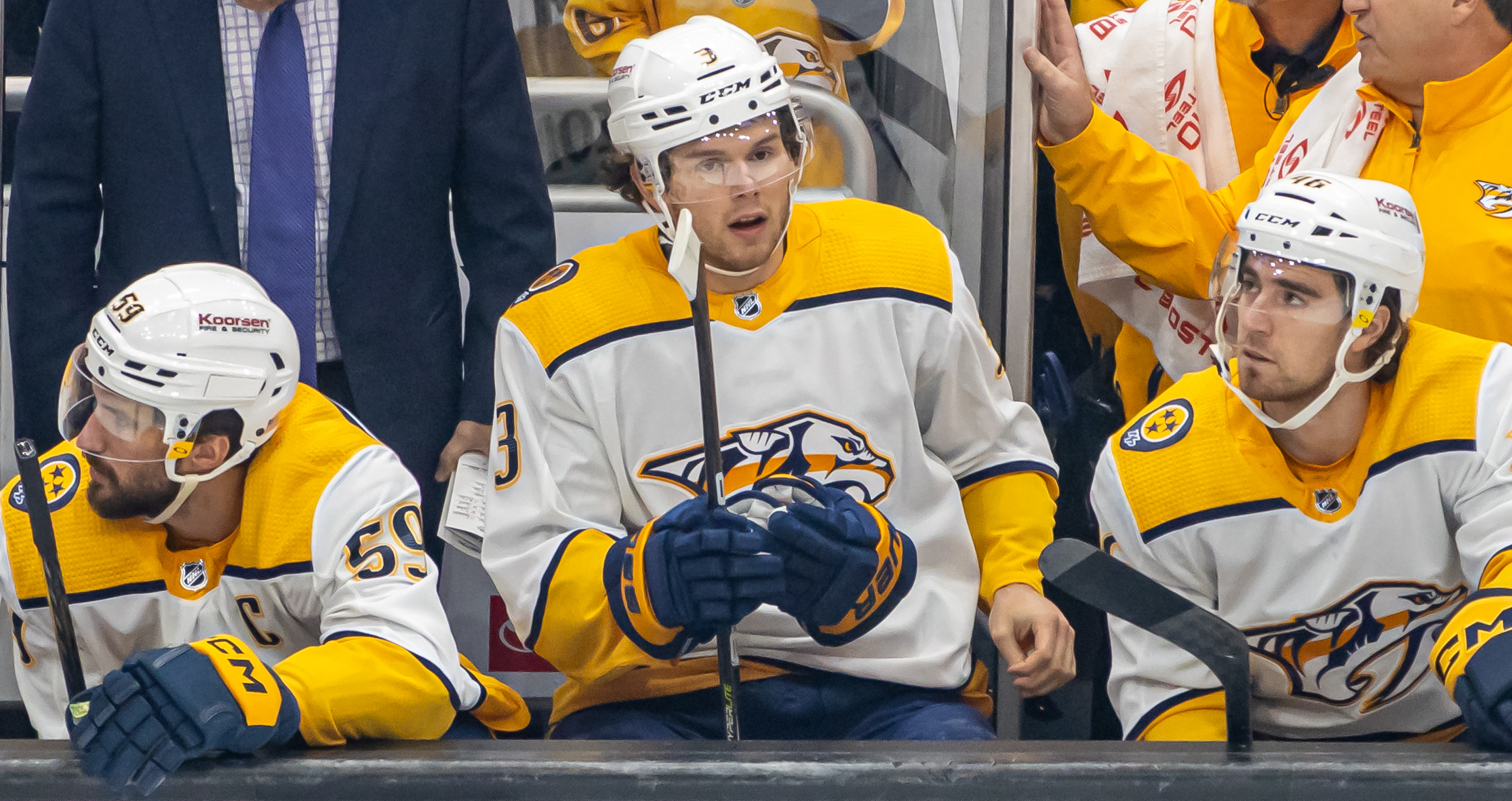
- Lauzon with the Nashville Predators in 2022
- Born: April 28, 1997 (age 29) Val-d'Or, Quebec, Canada
- Height: 6 ft 2 in (188 cm)
- Weight: 225 lb (102 kg; 16 st 1 lb)
- Position: Defence
- Shoots: Left
- NHL team Former teams: Vegas Golden Knights; Boston Bruins; Seattle Kraken; Nashville Predators
- NHL draft: 52nd overall, 2015; Boston Bruins
- Playing career: 2017–present

Jérémy Lauzon (French pronunciation: [ʒeʁemi lozɔ̃], born April 28, 1997) is a Canadian professional ice hockey player who is a defenceman for the Vegas Golden Knights of the National Hockey League (NHL). Lauzon was drafted by the Boston Bruins in the second round, 52nd overall, in the 2015 NHL entry draft.

Lauzon began playing ice hockey in his native Quebec, playing for the Amos Forestiers of the Quebec Junior Triple-A Hockey League starting in 2012. Lauzon then leveled up to the Quebec Major Junior Hockey League in 2013, joining the Rouyn-Noranda Huskies, where he would spend four seasons. In 2017, Lauzon joined the Providence Bruins, the American Hockey League (AHL) affiliate of the Boston Bruins. He made his NHL debut in 2018, and he scored his first NHL goal that same year. After four years with the Bruins organization, Lauzon was selected by the Seattle Kraken in the 2021 NHL expansion draft. Not too long into his tenure with the team, he was traded to the Nashville Predators. In 2024, Lauzon broke the NHL record for the most hits in a season, totaling 383, a record which has since been broken by Kiefer Sherwood. In 2025, after four seasons with Nashville, Lauzon was traded to the Vegas Golden Knights.

Internationally, Lauzon has competed in one competition, the 2017 World Junior Championships, where he won the silver medal representing Canada.

== Playing career ==
=== Junior ===
Lauzon started his ice hockey journey during the 2012–13 season, playing with the Amos Forestiers of the Quebec Junior Triple-A Hockey League. After the season, he was selected in the second round, 20th overall, by the Rouyn-Noranda Huskies in the 2013 Quebec Major Junior Hockey League (QMJHL) draft. During the 2013–14 season with the Huskies, Lauzon played in 55 games, scoring 5 goals and totaling 16 points. During that season's playoffs, Lauzon recorded two goals and two assists through nine games. Lauzon tripled his goal count during the 2014–15 season, notching 15 goals and 36 points through 60 games, while collecting 88 penalty minutes. Following the season, Lauzon was selected in the second round, 52nd overall, by the Boston Bruins in the 2015 NHL entry draft.

After Lauzon participated in the Bruins' 2015 development camp, he continued with the Huskies for the 2015–16 season. Through his first 15 games, Lauzon collected 24 points, going on a 13-game point streak. Due to his performance, on November 12, the Bruins signed Lauzon to a three-year, entry-level contract. Lauzon ended the season with 10 goals and 40 assists for 50 points through only 46 games. At the end of the regular season, he was named to the QMJHL 2nd All-Star Team. During the playoffs, on April 15, Lauzon's neck was cut by a skate blade, causing him to be rushed to the hospital and undergo surgery. Lauzon had had a goal and seven assists through eight games. A month after the injury, he returned, after the Huskies had won the QMJHL Presidents' Cup, but in time for the first game of the Memorial Cup. Lauzon participated in the Bruins' 2016 training camp before rejoining the Huskies for the 2016–17 season. Over the course of the season, Lauzon tallied five goals and 23 assists over 39 games. In the playoffs that season, Lauzon totaled five goals and nine assists for 14 points.

=== Professional ===
==== Boston Bruins ====
Lauzon made the opening night roster of the Boston Bruins' American Hockey League (AHL) affiliate, the Providence Bruins, for the 2017–18 season. Fifteen games into the season, after collecting two assists, Lauzon received a concussion, causing him to miss 22 games. He finished the season with one goal and six assists for seven points through 52 games. Lauzon made his NHL debut during the 2018–19 season on October 25, 2018, in a 3–0 win against the Philadelphia Flyers. On November 11, he scored his first career NHL goal against Malcolm Subban in a 4–1 win over the Vegas Golden Knights. In total, Lauzon skated 16 games that season in Boston. In Providence, he ended his season with one goal and six assists, managing a +7 rating.

During the 2019–20 season, on February 9, 2020, Lauzon was given a two-game suspension for an illegal check to the head of Arizona Coyotes' forward Derek Stepan the previous night. On February 14, the Bruins signed Lauzon to a two-year, US$1,700,000 contract extension. Lauzon ended the season with Boston with one goal and one assist in 19 games. In Providence, Lauzon had one goal and 12 assists in 45 games, with a +22 rating. With Boston during the playoffs, Lauzon played in six games.

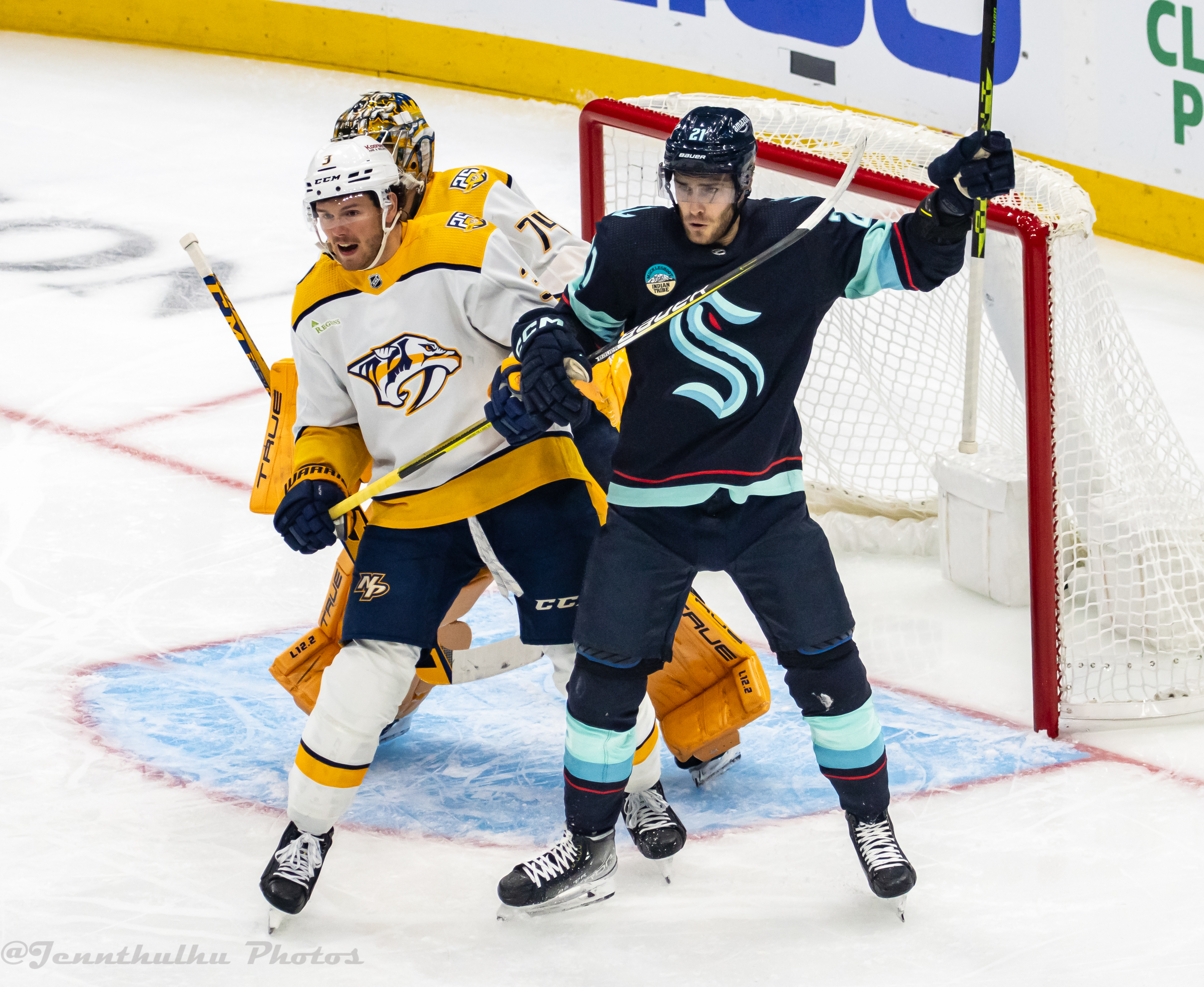
Lauzon (left) with the Predators next to Alexander Wennberg of the Kraken in 2023

On February 24, 2021, during the NHL Outdoors at Lake Tahoe against the Philadelphia Flyers, Lauzon suffered a broken hand, which would require surgery to repair. He had appeared in all 16 games for Boston that season before the injury. Lauzon would end the 2020–21 season with Boston collecting one goal and seven assists in 41 games. During Game 1 of the first round of the playoffs against the Washington Capitals, Lauzon injured his hand. He missed four games, returning in Game 1 of the second round against the New York Islanders. On May 31, in overtime of Game 2, Lauzon attempted to pass the puck to Charlie Coyle. However, the puck deflected off Coyle's skate and was picked up by Casey Cizikas on a breakaway, who would score the game-winning goal. Lauzon ended the playoffs with the Bruins playing seven games.

==== Seattle Kraken, Nashville Predators, and Vegas Golden Knights ====
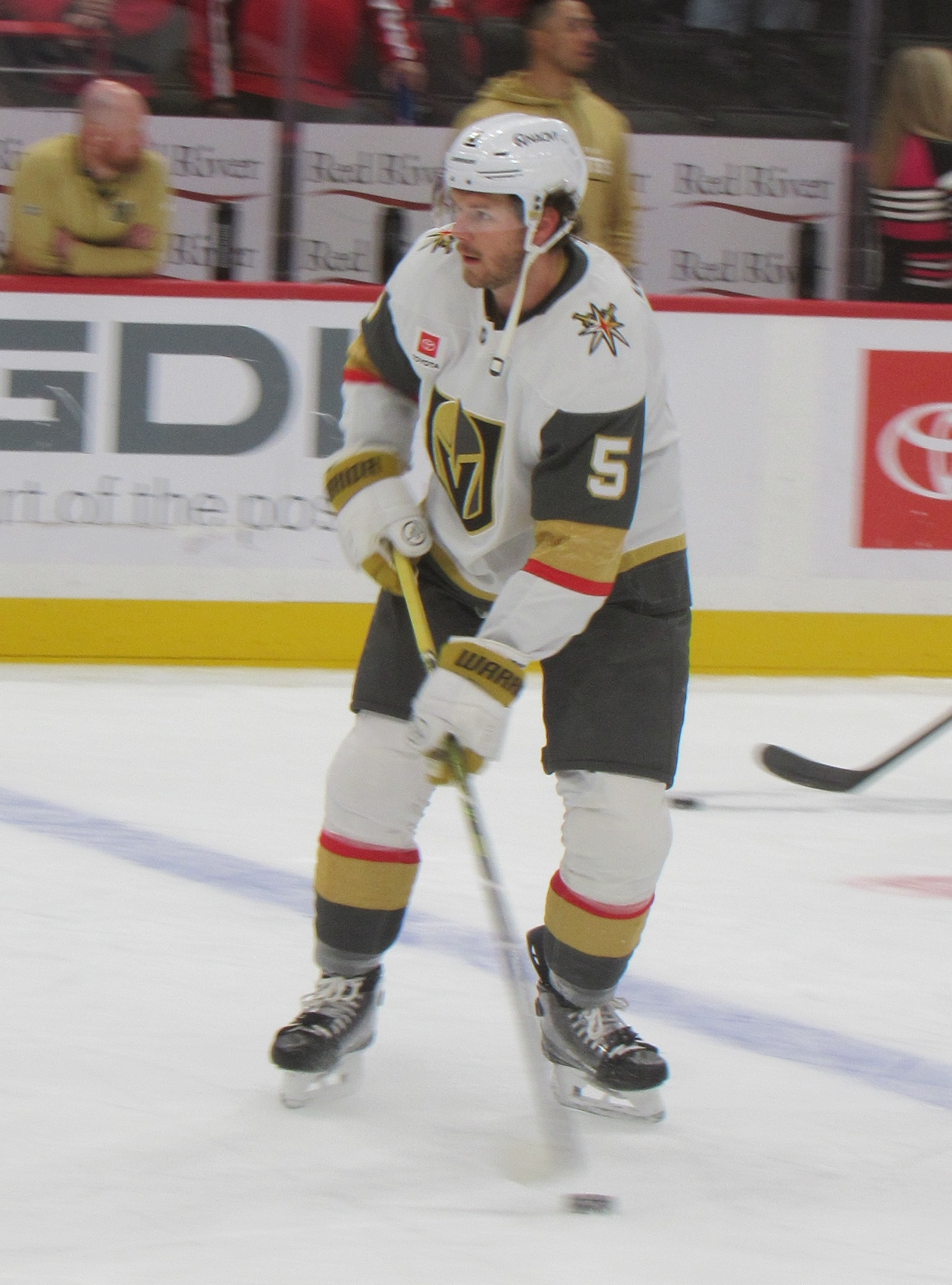
Lauzon with the Golden Knights in 2026

On July 21, 2021, Lauzon was selected from the Bruins at the 2021 NHL expansion draft by the Seattle Kraken. Lauzon was named to the Kraken's inaugural opening night roster. On March 20, 2022, just days before the trade deadline, Lauzon was traded by Seattle to the Nashville Predators in exchange for a 2022 second-round draft pick. In 53 games with the Kraken before the trade, Lauzon had collected one goal and five assists, while leading the Kraken with 176 hits. With Nashville, Lauzon scored only one goal through 13 games. With both teams that season, Lauzon notched a career-high 224 hits. On June 13, 2022, the Predators signed Lauzon to a 4-year, US$8,000,000 contract.

During the 2022–23 season, Lauzon scored three goals and nine assists, for 12 points through 67 games, all of which were career highs for him at the time. On April 15, 2024, during the 2023–24 season, Lauzon set the NHL record for most hits in a season, with 383 hits, in a game against the Pittsburgh Penguins, passing Matt Martin's previously record-holding 382, set during the 2014–15 season. Lauzon ended the season having more 10-hit games (3) than no-hit games (2), while setting even higher career highs, playing 79 games and scoring six goals and 14 points.

On February 18, 2025, the Predators announced that Lauzon would be out 4–6 weeks, missing the latter part of the 2024–25 season. In 28 games that season before the injury, Lauzon had collected one assist. On March 22, Kiefer Sherwood, Lauzon's former teammate, now on the Vancouver Canucks, collected his 384th hit of the season, breaking Lauzon's record. Following the season, on June 30, 2025, Lauzon, on the last year of his contract, was traded to the Vegas Golden Knights alongside Colton Sissons in exchange for Nicolas Hague and a conditional third-round pick in 2027.

On June 30, 2026, Lauzon signed a six-year, $24 million extension with the Golden Knights.

== International play ==
Medal record

Representing Canada

Ice hockey

World Junior Championships
Silver medal – second place	2017 Canada	

On December 15, 2016, Lauzon was nominated to Team Canada's roster for the 2017 World Junior Ice Hockey Championships. On December 27, in a game against Slovakia, Lauzon scored the first goal—which was also the game-winning goal—in Canada's eventual 5–0 victory over Slovakia. In the final game of the tournament, against the United States, Lauzon scored the second goal of the game. Canada would go on to lose the game 5–4 in a shootout, earning them the silver medal at the tournament.

== Personal life ==
Lauzon was born in Val-d'Or, Quebec, in 1997. He has two younger brothers, Zachary and Émile. Zachary was selected in the second round, 51st overall, by the Pittsburgh Penguins in the 2017 NHL entry draft. The two were teammates on the Rouyn-Noranda Huskies. However, Zachary retired in September 2019 due to concussion symptoms. Émile, the youngest, played for the Val-d'Or Foreurs of the QMJHL until he retired in 2022, due to problems stemming from his own head-related injury.

== Career statistics ==
=== Regular season and playoffs ===
			Regular season					Playoffs
Season	Team	League	GP	G	A	Pts	PIM	GP	G	A	Pts	PIM
2012–13	Amos Forestiers	QMAAA	41	4	11	15	52	—	—	—	—	—
2013–14	Rouyn-Noranda Huskies	QMJHL	55	5	11	16	64	9	2	2	4	4
2014–15	Rouyn-Noranda Huskies	QMJHL	60	15	21	36	88	—	—	—	—	—
2015–16	Rouyn-Noranda Huskies	QMJHL	46	10	40	50	80	9	1	7	8	8
2016–17	Rouyn-Noranda Huskies	QMJHL	39	5	23	28	50	13	5	9	14	22
2017–18	Providence Bruins	AHL	52	1	6	7	38	4	0	0	0	2
2018–19	Providence Bruins	AHL	29	1	6	7	42	4	1	0	1	4
2018–19	Boston Bruins	NHL	16	1	0	1	2	—	—	—	—	—
2019–20	Providence Bruins	AHL	45	1	12	13	65	—	—	—	—	—
2019–20	Boston Bruins	NHL	19	1	1	2	29	6	0	0	0	18
2020–21	Boston Bruins	NHL	41	1	7	8	40	7	0	0	0	2
2021–22	Seattle Kraken	NHL	53	1	5	6	67	—	—	—	—	—
2021–22	Nashville Predators	NHL	13	1	0	1	14	3	0	0	0	2
2022–23	Nashville Predators	NHL	67	3	9	12	66	—	—	—	—	—
2023–24	Nashville Predators	NHL	79	6	8	14	98	6	0	1	1	4
2024–25	Nashville Predators	NHL	28	0	1	1	37	—	—	—	—	—
2025–26	Vegas Golden Knights	NHL	68	1	12	13	89	12	0	0	0	6
NHL totals			384	15	43	58	442	34	0	1	1	32

=== International ===
Year	Team	Event	Result	GP	G	A	Pts	PIM
2017	Canada	WJC	2nd place, silver medalist(s)	7	2	1	3	2
Junior totals				7	2	1	3	2

== Awards and honours ==
Award	Year
QMJHL
QMJHL President's Cup champion	2016
Second All-Star Team	2016
