= Alexandre Fortin =

Canadian ice hockey player

- Born: February 25, 1997 (age 29) Blainville, Quebec, Canada
- Height: 6 ft 0 in (183 cm)
- Weight: 184 lb (83 kg; 13 st 2 lb)
- Position: Left wing
- Shoots: Left
- ECHL team Former teams: Orlando Solar Bears; Chicago Blackhawks
- NHL draft: Undrafted
- Playing career: 2017–present

Alexandre Fortin (born February 25, 1997) is a Canadian professional ice hockey left winger who is currently under contract with the Orlando Solar Bears in the ECHL. He has formerly played with the Chicago Blackhawks of the National Hockey League (NHL).

== Playing career ==
Fortin was drafted in the second round of the 2013 QMJHL draft by the Rouyn-Noranda Huskies. He helped the Huskies win their first Presidents Trophy Cup during the 2015–16 season.

On September 25, 2016, Fortin signed a three-year contract with the Blackhawks as an undrafted free agent. He was assigned to their American Hockey League affiliate, the Rockford IceHogs, to start the 2017–18 season with.

In the following 2018–19 season, on October 9, 2018, after Andreas Martinsen suffered a back injury, he was recalled from the IceHogs by Chicago. He recorded his first career NHL goal on October 21, in a 6-3 loss to the Tampa Bay Lightning.

Following the conclusion of his entry-level contract with the Blackhawks, Fortin as an impending restricted free agent was not tendered a qualifying offer and was released to free agency. Approaching the delayed 2020–21 season, Fortin was signed to a one-year contract to continue in the AHL with the Colorado Eagles, the primary affiliate to the Colorado Avalanche on January 6, 2021. In the pandemic delayed 2020–21 season, Fortin struggled to find his role within the Eagles, registering just 3 assists in 23 regular season games. He made one post-season divisional playoff game appearance before leaving the club at the conclusion of his contract.

As a free agent, Fortin continued within the AHL, securing a one-year contract with hometown provincial club, the Laval Rocket, on July 6, 2021. On August 22, 2022, the Hershey Bears signed Fortin.

On September 19, 2023, Fortin continued his career in the minor league by agreeing to a one-year contract with the Orlando Solar Bears of the ECHL.

== Personal life ==
Fortin's uncle is goaltender Jean-Sébastien Giguère who played in the NHL for 16 years with the Anaheim Ducks, Toronto Maple Leafs, and Colorado Avalanche.

== Career statistics ==
			Regular season					Playoffs
Season	Team	League	GP	G	A	Pts	PIM	GP	G	A	Pts	PIM
2014–15	Rouyn-Noranda Huskies	QMJHL	67	11	29	40	10	6	4	1	5	0
2015–16	Rouyn-Noranda Huskies	QMJHL	54	19	24	43	17	20	4	3	7	2
2016–17	Rouyn-Noranda Huskies	QMJHL	52	22	30	52	14	13	6	10	16	4
2017–18	Rockford IceHogs	AHL	53	4	17	21	22	1	0	0	0	0
2018–19	Rockford IceHogs	AHL	47	6	6	12	8	—	—	—	—	—
2018–19	Chicago Blackhawks	NHL	24	3	3	6	2	—	—	—	—	—
2019–20	Rockford IceHogs	AHL	44	8	9	17	12	—	—	—	—	—
2020–21	Colorado Eagles	AHL	23	0	3	3	6	1	0	0	0	0
2021–22	Laval Rocket	AHL	34	4	5	9	8	—	—	—	—	—
2021–22	Trois-Rivières Lions	ECHL	12	7	6	13	2	6	0	4	4	2
2022–23	South Carolina Stingrays	ECHL	37	14	19	33	20	—	—	—	—	—
2022–23	Hershey Bears	AHL	1	0	0	0	0	—	—	—	—	—
NHL totals			24	3	3	6	2	—	—	—	—	—
