= Mathieu Olivier =

American ice hockey player (born 1997)

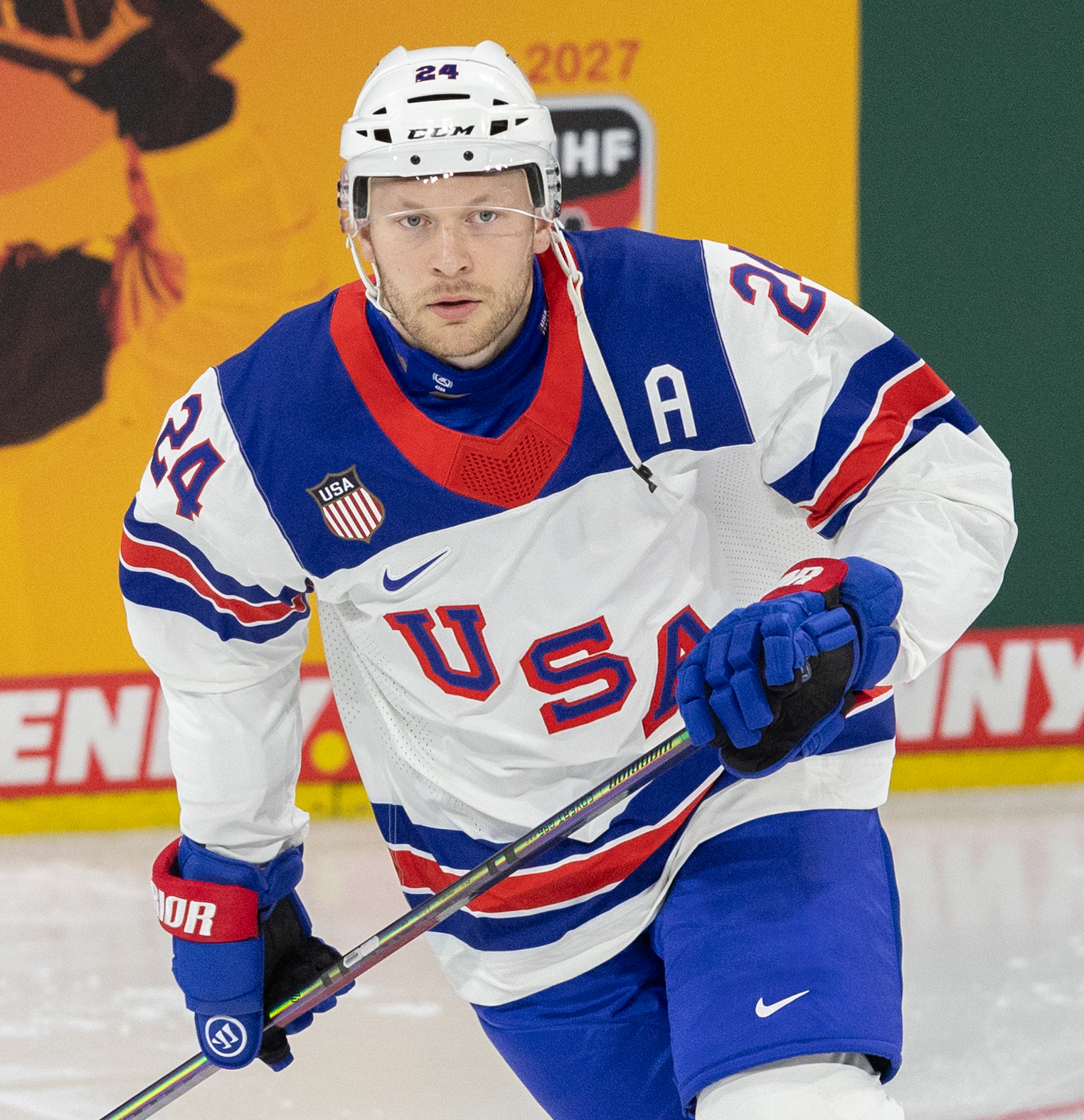
- Olivier with Team USA during the 2026 IIHF World Championship
- Born: February 11, 1997 (age 29) Biloxi, Mississippi, U.S.
- Height: 6 ft 1 in (185 cm)
- Weight: 232 lb (105 kg; 16 st 8 lb)
- Position: Right wing
- Shoots: Right
- NHL team Former teams: Columbus Blue Jackets; Nashville Predators
- National team: United States
- NHL draft: Undrafted
- Playing career: 2018–present

Mathieu Olivier (born February 11, 1997) is a Canadian-American professional ice hockey player who is a right winger and alternate captain for the Columbus Blue Jackets of the National Hockey League (NHL).

Olivier is the first Mississippi-born player in NHL history, as well as the first player born in the Gulf Coast region to play for the Predators.

== Early life ==
Olivier was born on February 11, 1997, in Biloxi, Mississippi while his father Simon was playing for the ECHL's Mississippi Sea Wolves. He lived in Mississippi for three months before moving to various cities and countries including Canada, Germany, Oklahoma City, and Houston while his father played hockey. He attended kindergarten in Germany and picked up the language before moving back to his family's native Canada.

== Playing career ==
=== Major Junior ===
Growing up in Quebec, Olivier as a youth played with the Lévis Commandeurs in the Quebec Junior AAA Hockey League (QMAAA) before he was selected by the Moncton Wildcats in the 2013 Quebec Major Junior Hockey League (QMJHL) Entry Draft. His tenure with the Wildcats only lasted one and a half seasons, however, as he was traded to the Shawinigan Cataractes for a 3rd round pick in December 2014. At the time of the trade, Olivier had accumulated 21 points through 86 games. Upon joining the Cataractes, Olivier played in the QMJHL's first Winter Classic and scored a goal in the 4–2 win over the Victoriaville Tigres.

Prior to the start of the 2015–16 season, Olivier was named an assistant captain alongside Alex Pawelczyk, Zachary Taylor, Alexis D'Aoust, and Giovanni Fiore. In this role, he helped lead the team to the President's Cup Finals before they were eliminated by the Rouyn-Noranda Huskies.

On the opening night of 2017–18 QMJHL training camps, Olivier was traded to the Sherbrooke Phoenix in exchange for two picks in the 2020 draft. By February 2018, Olivier had tallied 42 points with the Phoenix while also serving as an alternate captain. As a result of his play over his five seasons in the QMJHL, Olivier signed his first professional contract with the Milwaukee Admirals of the American Hockey League (AHL) on February 19, 2018. Following the signing, he remained with the Phoenix and helped them reach the second round of the post-season by recording six points through 10 games. As a result of his play during the regular and post-season, Olivier received the teams' MVP and Fan Favourite Award.

=== Professional ===
Upon concluding his major junior career, Olivier attended the Nashville Predators Development Camp and Prospects Showcase ahead of the 2018–19 season. In his first professional season, Olivier tallied four goals and 12 points through 54 games while also leading the AHL with 9 fights. As such, he was re-signed by the Predators to a two-year, entry-level contract for the 2019–20 and 2020–21 seasons.

Reassigned to continue his tenure with the Admirals to start the 2019–20 season, Olivier had 7 points in 17 games before earning his first recall to the Predators on November 18, 2019. He made his NHL debut, appearing on the fourth-line with the Predators in a 2–1 defeat to the Winnipeg Jets on November 19, 2019.

Following his fourth season within the Predators organization, Olivier was traded to the Columbus Blue Jackets in exchange for a fourth-round pick in 2022 on July 1, 2022.

On March 5, 2025, Olivier signed a six year, $18 million contract extension with the Blue Jackets.

== International play ==
Olivier was selected as an alternate captain for Team USA in the 2026 IIHF World Championship.

== Career statistics ==
=== Regular season and playoffs ===
			Regular season					Playoffs
Season	Team	League	GP	G	A	Pts	PIM	GP	G	A	Pts	PIM
2012–13	Lévis Commandeurs	QMAAA	42	9	5	14	12	4	1	0	1	0
2013–14	Moncton Wildcats	QMJHL	53	6	8	14	43	6	0	1	1	7
2014–15	Moncton Wildcats	QMJHL	33	3	4	7	39	—	—	—	—	—
2014–15	Shawinigan Cataractes	QMJHL	30	3	3	6	36	7	0	0	0	2
2015–16	Shawinigan Cataractes	QMJHL	59	11	19	30	80	21	3	4	7	13
2016–17	Shawinigan Cataractes	QMJHL	58	9	15	24	102	6	2	0	2	8
2017–18	Sherbrooke Phoenix	QMJHL	67	27	22	49	90	10	2	4	6	14
2018–19	Milwaukee Admirals	AHL	54	4	8	12	91	5	1	0	1	16
2019–20	Milwaukee Admirals	AHL	56	10	9	19	95	—	—	—	—	—
2019–20	Nashville Predators	NHL	8	0	1	1	4	—	—	—	—	—
2020–21	Nashville Predators	NHL	30	3	2	5	70	2	0	0	0	2
2021–22	Milwaukee Admirals	AHL	46	5	6	11	76	7	0	0	0	6
2021–22	Nashville Predators	NHL	10	0	1	1	14	3	0	0	0	12
2022–23	Columbus Blue Jackets	NHL	66	5	10	15	81	—	—	—	—	—
2023–24	Columbus Blue Jackets	NHL	54	5	7	12	70	—	—	—	—	—
2024–25	Columbus Blue Jackets	NHL	82	18	14	32	139	—	—	—	—	—
2025–26	Columbus Blue Jackets	NHL	61	15	11	26	101	—	—	—	—	—
NHL totals			311	46	46	92	479	5	0	0	0	14

=== International ===
Year	Team	Event	Result	GP	G	A	Pts	PIM
2026	United States	WC	8th	8	2	3	5	8
Senior totals				8	1	2	3	0
