= 2016–17 QMJHL season =

- League: Quebec Major Junior Hockey League
- Sport: Hockey
- Duration: Regular season September 22, 2016 – March 18, 2017; Playoffs; March 23, 2017 – May 10, 2017
- Teams: 18
- TV partner(s): Eastlink TV; TVA Sports; MATV

Draft
- Top draft pick: Benoit-Olivier Groulx
- Picked by: Halifax Mooseheads

Regular season
- Jean Rougeau Trophy: Saint John Sea Dogs (4)
- Season MVP: Vitalii Abramov (Gatineau Olympiques)
- Top scorer: Vitalii Abramov (Gatineau Olympiques)

Playoffs
- Playoffs MVP: Thomas Chabot (Sea Dogs)
- Finals champions: Saint John Sea Dogs
- Runners-up: Blainville-Boisbriand Armada

QMJHL seasons
- 2015–16 2017–18

2016–17 CHL seasons
- League: Canadian Hockey League
- Sport: Hockey
- Duration: OHL; September 2016 – March 2017; QMJHL; September 2016 – March 2017; WHL; September 2016 – March 2017
- Teams: 60
- TV partner(s): TVA Sports, Rogers Sportsnet, Rogers TV, Shaw TV
- Season MVP: Alex DeBrincat (Erie Otters) (OHL)
- Top scorer: Sam Steel (Regina Pats) (WHL)

Memorial Cup
- Finals champions: Windsor Spitfires (OHL) (3rd title)
- Runners-up: Erie Otters (OHL)

The 2016–17 QMJHL season is the 48th season of the Quebec Major Junior Hockey League (QMJHL). The regular season began on September 22, 2016, and ended on March 18, 2017.

The playoffs began on March 23, 2017, and ended on May 10. The winning team, the Saint John Sea Dogs, were awarded the President's Cup and a berth in the 2017 Memorial Cup tournament, which was held at the WFCU Centre in Windsor, Ontario, from May 19–28, 2017.

== Regular season standings ==
Note: GP = Games played; W = Wins; L = Losses; OTL = Overtime losses; SL = Shootout losses; GF = Goals for; GA = Goals against; PTS = Points; x = clinched playoff berth; y = clinched division title

Maritimes Division	GP	W	L	OTL	SL	PTS	GF	GA	Rank
xyz-Saint John Sea Dogs	68	48	14	5	1	102	287	180	1
x-Charlottetown Islanders	68	46	18	4	0	96	303	214	4
x-Acadie–Bathurst Titan	68	39	23	4	2	84	284	242	6
x-Cape Breton Screaming Eagles	68	39	25	2	2	82	270	230	7
x-Halifax Mooseheads	68	27	35	3	3	60	229	259	15
Moncton Wildcats	68	14	51	2	1	31	170	356	18

East Division	GP	W	L	OTL	SL	PTS	GF	GA	Rank
xy-Shawinigan Cataractes	68	42	20	4	2	90	258	184	3
x-Chicoutimi Saguenéens	68	38	25	3	2	81	206	205	8
x-Victoriaville Tigres	68	35	25	6	2	78	230	231	9
x-Quebec Remparts	68	31	30	4	3	69	187	237	11
x-Baie-Comeau Drakkar	68	26	32	6	4	62	203	230	13
x-Rimouski Océanic	68	26	35	6	1	59	229	255	16

West Division	GP	W	L	OTL	SL	PTS	GF	GA	Rank
xy-Rouyn-Noranda Huskies	68	43	18	2	5	93	272	181	2
x-Blainville-Boisbriand Armada	68	43	19	4	2	92	224	171	5
x-Gatineau Olympiques	68	33	31	4	0	70	234	253	10
x-Drummondville Voltigeurs	68	28	34	1	5	62	214	263	12
x-Val-d'Or Foreurs	68	28	35	3	2	61	210	265	14
Sherbrooke Phoenix	68	26	38	1	3	56	214	268	17

== Scoring leaders ==
Note: GP = Games played; G = Goals; A = Assists; Pts = Points; PIM = Penalty minutes

Player	Team	GP	G	A	Pts	PIM
Vitalii Abramov	Gatineau Olympiques	66	46	58	104	76
Tyler Boland	Rimouski Océanic	68	48	55	103	24
François Beauchemin	Val-d'Or/Charlottetown	69	45	52	97	76
Filip Chlapík	Charlottetown Islanders	57	34	57	91	98
Giovanni Fiore	Cape Breton Screaming Eagles	61	52	38	90	42
Christophe Boivin	Acadie–Bathurst Titan	68	43	47	90	44
Alexandre Goulet	Victoriaville Tigres	68	39	50	89	58
Matthew Highmore	Saint John Sea Dogs	64	34	55	89	46
Maxime Fortier	Halifax Mooseheads	68	32	55	87	20
Nico Hischier	Halifax Mooseheads	57	38	48	86	24

== Leading goaltenders ==
Note: GP = Games played; Mins = Minutes played; W = Wins; L = Losses: OTL = Overtime losses; SL = Shootout losses; GA = Goals Allowed; SO = Shutouts; GAA = Goals against average

Player	Team	GP	Mins	W	L	OTL	SOL	GA	SO	Sv%	GAA
Francis Leclerc	Blainville-Boisbriand Armada	30	1664	15	8	2	2	64	4	.908	2.31
Sam Montembeault	Blainville-Boisbriand Armada	41	2226	28	9	1	0	89	6	.907	2.40
Mikhail Denisov	Shawinigan Cataractes	52	3009	31	18	1	1	123	4	.909	2.45
Callum Booth	Saint John Sea Dogs	47	2668	31	12	2	1	115	4	.911	2.59
Samuel Harvey	Rouyn-Noranda Huskies	43	2499	26	10	1	3	109	3	.900	2.62

== 2017 President's Cup playoffs ==
Round 1
1	Saint John	4
16	Rimouski	0
3	Shawinigan	2
14	Val-d'Or	4
2	Rouyn-Noranda	4
15	Halifax	2
8	Chicoutimi	4
9	Victoriaville	0
4	Charlottetown	4
13	Baie-Comeau	0
7	Cape Breton	4
10	Gatineau	3
5	Blainville-Boisbriand	4
12	Drummondville	0
6	Acadie–Bathurst	4
11	Quebec	0

Quarter-finals
1	Saint John	4
14	Val-d'Or	0
2	Rouyn-Noranda	3
8	Chicoutimi	4
4	Charlottetown	4
7	Cape Breton	0
5	Blainville-Boisbriand	4
6	Acadie–Bathurst	3

Semi-finals
1	Saint John	4
8	Chicoutimi	2
4	Charlottetown	1
5	Blainville-Boisbriand	4

President's Cup Championship
1	Saint John	4
5	Blainville-Boisbriand	0

== First round ==
=== (1) Saint John Sea Dogs vs. (16) Rimouski Océanic ===
March 24	Saint John Sea Dogs	9 – 2	Rimouski Océanic	Harbour Station	Recap
6:38 - Mathieu Joseph (1); 7:46 - Cole Reginato (1); 10:45 - Joe Veleno (1); 15:25 - Spencer Smallman (1)		First period	Denis Mikhnin (1) - 14:00
3:30 - Kyle Ward (1); 4:20 - Spencer Smallman (2)		Second period	Alexandre Grisé (1) - 6:40
11:51 - sh - Mathieu Joseph (2); 14:12 - Julien Gauthier (1); 17:22 - Spencer Smallman (3)		Third period	No scoring
Callum Booth (22 saves / 24 shots)		Goalie stats	Alexandre Lagacé (9 saves / 13 shots); Jimmy Lemay (22 saves / 27 shots)

March 25	Saint John Sea Dogs	4 – 1	Rimouski Océanic	Harbour Station	Recap
5:09 - Bokondji Imama (1)		First period	Tyler Boland (1) - 16:21
5:47 - sh - Thomas Chabot (1)		Second period	No scoring
13:33 - Mathieu Joseph (3); 19:44 - en - Thomas Chabot (2)		Third period	No scoring
Callum Booth (17 saves / 18 shots)		Goalie stats	Alexandre Lagacé (32 saves / 35 shots)

March 28	Rimouski Océanic	2 – 5	Saint John Sea Dogs	Colisée de Rimouski	Recap
11:58 - Denis Mikhnin (2)		First period	Jakub Zbořil (1) - pp - 10:34
No scoring		Second period	Bokondji Imama (2) - 5:49; Matthew Highmore (1) - 8:35
2:01 - Nicholas Blachman (1)		Third period	Joe Veleno (2) - 8:24; Bokondji Imama (3) - 8:49
Alexandre Lagacé (33 saves / 38 shots)		Goalie stats	Callum Booth (10 saves / 12 shots)

March 29	Rimouski Océanic	3 – 4	Saint John Sea Dogs	Colisée de Rimouski	Recap
5:46 - sh - Carson MacKinnon (1)		First period	Thomas Chabot (3) - pp - 15:26
13:23 - Samuel Laberge (1); 16:33 - Alex-Olivier Voyer (1)		Second period	Kyle Ward (2) - 15:10
		Third period	Matthew Highmore (2) - 11:41; Simon Bourque (1) - 16:42
Charles-Olivier Lévesque (42 saves / 46 shots)		Goalie stats	Callum Booth (13 saves / 16 shots)

Saint John wins series 4 – 0

=== (2) Rouyn-Noranda Huskies vs. (15) Halifax Mooseheads ===
March 24	Rouyn-Noranda Huskies	4 – 5	Halifax Mooseheads	Aréna Iamgold	Recap
3:51 - Peter Abbandonato (1)		First period	Nico Hischier (1) - 3:34
1:25 - Jérémy Lauzon (1)		Second period	Arnaud Durandeau (1) - 4:01; Keigan Goetz (1) - sh - 5:34; Maxime Fortier (1) - pp - 18:36
14:07 - pp - Philippe Myers (1); 14:33 - pp - Mathieu Boucher (1)		Third period	Raphaël Lavoie (1) - 7:03
Samuel Harvey (18 saves / 23 shots)		Goalie stats	Alexis Gravel (41 saves / 45 shots)

March 25	Rouyn-Noranda Huskies	3 – 2	OT	Halifax Mooseheads	Aréna Iamgold	Recap
10:28 - Jérémy Lauzon (2)		First period		Benoit-Olivier Groulx (1) - 4:22
No scoring		Second period		No scoring
3:06 - Hugo Després (1)		Third period		Arnaud Durandeau (2) - 6:52
10:38 - Gabriel Fontaine (1)		First overtime period		No scoring
Olivier Tremblay (20 saves / 23 shots); Samuel Harvey (0 saves / 0 shots)		Goalie stats		Alexis Gravel (44 saves / 47 shots)

March 28	Halifax Mooseheads	0 – 2	Rouyn-Noranda Huskies	Scotiabank Centre	Recap
No scoring		First period	Zachary Lauzon (1) - 17:08
No scoring		Second period	No scoring
No scoring		Third period	Manuel Wiederer (1) - en - 19:51
Alexis Gravel (43 saves / 44 shots)		Goalie stats	Olivier Tremblay (29 saves / 29 shots)

March 29	Halifax Mooseheads	3 – 1	Rouyn-Noranda Huskies	Scotiabank Centre	Recap
1:15 - Jake Coughler (1); 17:41 - pp - Nico Hischier (2)		First period	No scoring
5:47 - Frédéric Aubé (1)		Second period	Alexandre Fortin (1) - 7:59
No scoring		Third period	No scoring
Alexis Gravel (32 saves / 33 shots)		Goalie stats	Olivier Tremblay (11 saves / 14 shots); Samuel Harvey (9 saves / 9 shots)

March 31	Halifax Mooseheads	5 – 6	3OT	Rouyn-Noranda Huskies	Scotiabank Centre	Recap
Maxime Fortier (2) - sh - 7:52; Maxime Fortier (3) - 19:55		First period		19:20 - Alexandre Fortin (2)
Nico Hischier (3) - 17:18		Second period		1:36 - J.C. Beaudin (1); 11:05 - Alexandre Fortin (3)
Joel Bishop (1) - pp - 15:01; Maxime Fortier (4) - 17:13		Third period		17:53 - pp - Jérémy Lauzon (3); 19:40 - Mathieu Boucher (2)
No scoring		Third overtime period		0:26 - Gabriel Fontaine (2)
Alexis Gravel (49 saves / 55 shots)		Goalie stats		Samuel Harvey (38 saves / 43 shots)

April 3	Rouyn-Noranda Huskies	5 – 2	Halifax Mooseheads	Aréna Iamgold	Recap
Philippe Myers (2) - pp - 4:36		First period	No scoring
Gabriel Fontaine (3) - 5:52; Tyler Hinam (1) - 6:59		Second period	11:45 - Frédéric Aubé (2)
Mathieu Boucher (3) - 3:11; J.C. Beaudin (2) - 10:17		Third period	0:32 - sh - Jordan Lepage (1)
Olivier Tremblay (22 saves / 24 shots)		Goalie stats	Alexis Gravel (34 saves / 39 shots)

Rouyn-Noranda wins series 4 – 2

=== (3) Shawinigan Cataractes vs. (14) Val-d'Or Foreurs ===
March 24	Shawinigan Cataractes	2 – 5	Val-d'Or Foreurs	Centre Gervais Auto	Recap
16:28 - pp - Sam Girard (1)		First period	Simon Lafrance (1) - 8:32
15:30 - Justin Bernier (1)		Second period	No scoring
No scoring		Third period	Jake Smith (1) - 4:21; Alexis Pépin (1) - pp - 5:42; Charley Graaskamp (1) - 6:34; Charley Graaskamp (2) - en - 19:28
Mikhail Denisov (17 saves / 21 shots)		Goalie stats	Étienne Montpetit (20 saves / 22 shots)

March 25	Shawinigan Cataractes	3 – 0	Val-d'Or Foreurs	Centre Gervais Auto	Recap
15:58 - Mathieu Olivier (1)		First period	No scoring
No scoring		Second period	No scoring
7:26 - Samuel Guilbault (1); 11:49 - pp - Xavier Pouliot (1)		Third period	No scoring
Mikhail Denisov (26 saves / 26 shots)		Goalie stats	Étienne Montpetit (42 saves / 45 shots)

March 28	Val-d'Or Foreurs	3 – 6	Shawinigan Cataractes	Centre Air Creebec	Recap
8:39 - pp - Jake Smith (2); 17:19 - pp - Alexis Pépin (2)		First period	Dennis Yan (1) - pp - 2:40
1:53 - pp - Maxim Mizyurin (1)		Second period	Dennis Yan (2) - 7:31; Dennis Yan (3) - pp - 14:24; Alexis D'Aoust (1) - 17:09
No scoring		Third period	Alexis D'Aoust (2) - 3:38; Mathieu Olivier (2) - en - 19:03
Étienne Montpetit (33 saves / 38 shots)		Goalie stats	Mikhail Denisov (25 saves / 28 shots)

March 29	Val-d'Or Foreurs	3 – 2	Shawinigan Cataractes	Centre Air Creebec	Recap
No scoring		First period	No scoring
18:17 - Alexis Pépin (3)		Second period	No scoring
6:30 - Mathieu Nadeau (1); 12:38 - sh - Maxim Mizyurin (2)		Third period	Nicholas Welsh (1) - pp - 2:09; Alexis D'Aoust (3) - 17:22
Étienne Montpetit (41 saves / 43 shots)		Goalie stats	Mikhail Denisov (23 saves / 26 shots)

March 31	Shawinigan Cataractes	1 – 3	Val-d'Or Foreurs	Centre Gervais Auto	Recap
No scoring		First period	Mathieu Nadeau (2) - 4:22; Mathieu Nadeau (3) - 8:38; David Noël (1) - pp - 10:30
14:40 - Alexis D'Aoust (4)		Second period	No scoring
No scoring		Third period	No scoring
Mikhail Denisov (3 saves / 6 shots); Zachary Bouthillier (16 saves / 16 shots)		Goalie stats	Étienne Montpetit (35 saves / 36 shots)

April 2	Val-d'Or Foreurs	5 – 1	Shawinigan Cataractes	Centre Air Creebec	Recap
19:37 - pp - Charley Graaskamp (3)		First period	Alexis D'Aoust (5) - 14:23
6:09 - pp - Maxim Mizyurin (3); 10:45 - Mathieu Nadeau (4)		Second period	No scoring
2:04 - pp - Alexis Pépin (4); 4:55 - Charley Graaskamp (4)		Third period	No scoring
Étienne Montpetit (38 saves / 39 shots)		Goalie stats	Mikhail Denisov (19 saves / 24 shots)

Val-d'Or wins series 4 – 2

=== (4) Charlottetown Islanders vs. (13) Baie-Comeau Drakkar ===
March 24	Charlottetown Islanders	4 – 2	Baie-Comeau Drakkar	Eastlink Centre	Recap
6:23 - pp - Kameron Kielly (1); 13:53 - pp - Adam Harsh (1); 19:46 - pp - Daniel Sprong (1)		First period	Vincent Deslauriers (1) - 16:19
No scoring		Second period	Shawn Element (1) - 17:20
9:01 - Alex Dostie (1)		Third period	No scoring
Mark Grametbauer (27 saves / 29 shots)		Goalie stats	Antoine Samuel (49 saves / 53 shots)

March 25	Charlottetown Islanders	9 – 2	Baie-Comeau Drakkar	Eastlink Centre	Recap
6:26 - Matthew Grouchy (1); 8:05 - Alex Dostie (2); 11:11 - Alex Dostie (3)		First period	No scoring
0:58 - François Beauchemin (1); 4:37 - Kameron Kielly (2); 12:38 - sh - Dillon Boucher (1)		Second period	D'Artagnan Joly (1) - 18:26
2:24 - Keith Getson (1); 10:33 - pp - Alex Dostie (4); 18:49 - pp - Nicolas Meloche (1)		Third period	Ivan Chekhovich (1) - 15:17
Mark Grametbauer (20 saves / 22 shots)		Goalie stats	Antoine Samuel (32 saves / 39 shots); Justin Blanchette (18 saves / 20 shots)

March 28	Baie-Comeau Drakkar	1 – 3	Charlottetown Islanders	Centre Henry-Leonard	Recap
16:12 - pp - Jordan Martel (1)		First period	No scoring
No scoring		Second period	Alex Dostie (5) - 6:00
No scoring		Third period	Keith Getson (2) - 7:12; Daniel Sprong (2) - pp - 9:39
Antoine Samuel (29 saves / 32 shots)		Goalie stats	Mark Grametbauer (16 saves / 17 shots)

March 29	Baie-Comeau Drakkar	1 – 4	Charlottetown Islanders	Centre Henry-Leonard	Recap
14:23 - pp - Samuel Thibault (1)		First period	Dillon Boucher (2) - 3:55
No scoring		Second period	No scoring
No scoring		Third period	Keith Getson (3) - 1:51; Pascal Aquin (1) - 10:47; Filip Chlapík (1) - en - 17:45
Antoine Samuel (43 saves / 46 shots)		Goalie stats	Mark Grametbauer (29 saves / 30 shots)

Charlottetown wins series 4 – 0

=== (5) Blainville-Boisbriand Armada vs. (12) Drummondville Voltigeurs ===
March 23	Blainville-Boisbriand Armada	3 – 1	Drummondville Voltigeurs	Centre d'Excellence Sports Rousseau	Recap
1:08 - Alex Barré-Boulet (1); 8:20 - pp - Connor Bramwell (1)		First period	No scoring
No scoring		Second period	Nicolas Guay (1) - 19:16
15:59 - Yvan Mongo (1)		Third period	No scoring
Sam Montembeault (14 saves / 15 shots)		Goalie stats	Olivier Rodrigue (3 saves / 5 shots); Émilien Boily (18 saves / 19 shots)

March 24	Blainville-Boisbriand Armada	4 – 1	Drummondville Voltigeurs	Centre d'Excellence Sports Rousseau	Recap
19:14 - Alexandre Alain (1)		First period	Pavel Koltygin (1) - 19:37
15:33 - Connor Bramwell (2)		Second period	No scoring
5:30 - Joël Teasdale (1); 11:10 - Pascal Corbeil (1)		Third period	No scoring
Sam Montembeault (10 saves / 11 shots)		Goalie stats	Émilien Boily (32 saves / 36 shots)

March 26	Drummondville Voltigeurs	1 – 4	Blainville-Boisbriand Armada	Centre Marcel Dionne	Recap
No scoring		First period	Morgan Adams-Moisan (1) - 5:35; Alexandre Alain (2) - 19:30
No scoring		Second period	Alex Barré-Boulet (2) - pp - 0:35
9:23 - Mathieu Sévigny (1)		Third period	Alexandre Alain (3) - en - 19:26
Émilien Boily (24 saves / 27 shots)		Goalie stats	Sam Montembeault (18 saves / 19 shots)

March 29	Drummondville Voltigeurs	1 – 4	Blainville-Boisbriand Armada	Centre Marcel Dionne	Recap
8:37 - pp - Mathieu Sévigny (2)		First period	Pierre-Luc Dubois (1) - pp - 18:49
		Second period	Alex Barré-Boulet (3) - 1:00
		Third period	Pascal Corbeil (2) - 5:37; Miguel Picard (1) - en - 19:49
Olivier Rodrigue (25 saves / 28 shots)		Goalie stats	Sam Montembeault (27 saves / 28 shots)

Blainville-Boisbriand wins series 4 – 0

=== (6) Acadie–Bathurst Titan vs. (11) Quebec Remparts ===
March 24	Acadie–Bathurst Titan	4 – 2	Quebec Remparts	K. C. Irving Regional Centre	Recap
3:30 - pp - Daniil Miromanov (1)		First period	Yanick Turcotte (1) - 10:09; Derek Gentile (1) - 12:10
7:15 - pp - Vladimir Kuznetsov (1); 8:24 - Adam Holwell (1)		Second period	No scoring
19:34 - en - Jeffrey Viel (1)		Third period	No scoring
Anthony Dumont-Bouchard (15 saves / 17 shots)		Goalie stats	Evgeny Kiselev (39 saves / 42 shots)

March 25	Acadie–Bathurst Titan	6 – 2	Quebec Remparts	K. C. Irving Regional Centre	Recap
4:24 - Christophe Boivin (1); 7:02 - Vladimir Kuznetsov (2)		First period	Louis-Filip Côté (1) - 9:03
No scoring		Second period	Dmitry Buinitsky (1) - pp - 19:03
8:07 - Dawson Theede (1); 15:39 - Vladimir Kuznetsov (3); 17:44 - en - Rodrigo Ābols (1); 19:23 - Rodrigo Ābols (2)		Third period	No scoring
Anthony Dumont-Bouchard (20 saves / 22 shots)		Goalie stats	Evgeny Kiselev (38 saves / 43 shots)

March 28	Quebec Remparts	3 – 7	Acadie–Bathurst Titan	Centre Vidéotron	Recap
No scoring		First period	Vladimir Kuznetsov (4) - 4:02; Jordan Maher (1) - 19:56
0:40 - Matthew Boucher (1); 5:09 - Derek Gentile (2)		Second period	No scoring
6:43 - Andrew Coxhead (1)		Third period	Jeffrey Viel (2) - pp - 8:51; Christophe Boivin (2) - 10:07; Vladimir Kuznetsov (5) - 16:00; Jeffrey Viel (3) - 16:53; Dawson Theede (2) - sh - en - 19:12
Evgeny Kiselev (5 saves / 7 shots); Déreck Baribeau (27 saves / 31 shots)		Goalie stats	Anthony Dumont-Bouchard (19 saves / 22 shots)

March 29	Quebec Remparts	1 – 4	Acadie–Bathurst Titan	Centre Vidéotron	Recap
10:21 - pp - Philipp Kurashev (1)		First period	Antoine Morand (1) - 12:27
No scoring		Second period	Rodrigo Ābols (3) - 3:20
No scoring		Third period	Jordan Maher (2) - en - 18:24; Christophe Boivin (3) - en - 19:20
Evgeny Kiselev (39 saves / 41 shots)		Goalie stats	Anthony Dumont-Bouchard (19 saves / 20 shots)

Acadie–Bathurst wins series 4 – 0

=== (7) Cape Breton Screaming Eagles vs. (10) Gatineau Olympiques ===
March 24	Cape Breton Screaming Eagles	1 – 0	OT	Gatineau Olympiques	Centre 200	Recap
No scoring		First period		No scoring
No scoring		Second period		No scoring
No scoring		Third period		No scoring
1:08 - sh - Giovanni Fiore (1)		First overtime period		No scoring
Kyle Jessiman (25 saves / 25 shots)		Goalie stats		Mathieu Bellemare (33 saves / 34 shots)

March 25	Cape Breton Screaming Eagles	7 – 6	OT	Gatineau Olympiques	Centre 200	Recap
16:46 - pp - Leon Gawanke (1); 17:01 - Drake Batherson (1)		First period		Zack MacEwen (1) - 9:14; Jake Barter (1) - 9:30
10:42 - Ross MacDougall (1); 11:00 - Phélix Martineau (1); 17:52 - pp - Drake Batherson (2); 19:37 - Massimo Carozza (1)		Second period		Zack MacEwen (2) - 2:37; Mitchell Balmas (1) - 4:44; Alexandre Landreville (1) - 6:04; Shawn Boudrias (1) - 13:55
No scoring		Third period		No scoring
11:31 - Declan Smith (1)		First overtime period		No scoring
Kevin Mandolese (15 saves / 20 shots); Kyle Jessiman (17 saves / 20 shots)		Goalie stats		Mathieu Bellemare (29 saves / 35 shots); Tristan Bérubé (19 saves / 20 shots)

March 28	Gatineau Olympiques	2 – 5	Cape Breton Screaming Eagles	Robert Guertin Centre	Recap
13:29 - Zack MacEwen (3)		First period	Jordan-Ty Fournier (1) - 14:05; Drake Batherson (3) - 15:14; Alexis Sansfaçon (1) - 18:50
No scoring		Second period	No scoring
6:16 - Daniel Del Paggio (1)		Third period	Giovanni Fiore (2) - 2:30; Yannik Bertrand (1) - 3:47
Mathieu Bellemare (14 saves / 17 shots); Tristan Bérubé (21 saves / 23 shots)		Goalie stats	Kyle Jessiman (21 saves / 23 shots)

March 29	Gatineau Olympiques	4 – 3	Cape Breton Screaming Eagles	Robert Guertin Centre	Recap
5:20 - Yakov Trenin (1); 13:49 - pp - Vincent Milot-Ouellet (1)		First period	Jordan-Ty Fournier (2) - 16:50
4:25 - Jacob Lapierre (1); 17:09 - Vitalii Abramov (1)		Second period	Drake Batherson (4) - pp - 11:01; Giovanni Fiore (3) - pp - 14:11
No scoring		Third period	No scoring
Tristan Bérubé (28 saves / 31 shots)		Goalie stats	Kyle Jessiman (27 saves / 31 shots)

March 31	Gatineau Olympiques	5 – 3	Cape Breton Screaming Eagles	Robert Guertin Centre	Recap
Jeffrey Durocher (1) - 10:29		First period	3:32 - Drake Batherson (5); 9:32 - Giovanni Fiore (4)
Yakov Trenin (2) - 17:18		Second period	No scoring
Zack MacEwen (4) - pp - 16:05; Shawn Boudrias (2) - 16:45; Alexandre Landreville (2) - en - 19:59		Third period	1:27 - pp - Drake Batherson (6)
Tristan Bérubé (37 saves / 40 shots)		Goalie stats	Kyle Jessiman (21 saves / 25 shots)

April 3	Cape Breton Screaming Eagles	1 – 5	Gatineau Olympiques	Centre 200	Recap
Yannik Bertrand (2) - 13:05		First period	11:06 - Zack MacEwen (5); 11:32 - Zack MacEwen (6)
No scoring		Second period	14:26 - Mitchell Balmas (2)
No scoring		Third period	2:48 - Mitchell Balmas (3); 12:57 - pp - Mitchell Balmas (4)
Kyle Jessiman (27 saves / 32 shots)		Goalie stats	Tristan Bérubé (28 saves / 29 shots)

April 4	Cape Breton Screaming Eagles	5 – 4	OT	Gatineau Olympiques	Centre 200	Recap
7:14 - Drake Batherson (7); 8:54 - Jordan-Ty Fournier (3); 17:38 - Massimo Carozza (2)		First period		Shawn Boudrias (3) - 12:22
11:56 - Massimo Carozza (3)		Second period		Anthony Gagnon (1) - 10:31; Alexandre Landreville (3) - 10:39
No scoring		Third period		Yakov Trenin (3) - pp - 13:06
2:30 - Jordan-Ty Fournier (4)		First overtime period		No scoring
Kyle Jessiman (26 saves / 30 shots)		Goalie stats		Tristan Bérubé (32 saves / 37 shots)

Cape Breton wins series 4 – 3

=== (8) Chicoutimi Saguenéens vs. (9) Victoriaville Tigres ===
March 24	Chicoutimi Saguenéens	4 – 3	Victoriaville Tigres	Centre Georges-Vézina	Recap
3:22 - Nicolas Roy (1); 5:08 - pp - Kelly Klima (1)		First period	No scoring
3:54 - pp - Dmitry Zhukenov (1); 17:00 - Olivier Galipeau (1)		Second period	Jimmy Huntington (1) - sh - 3:17; Félix Lauzon (1) - pp - 15:15
No scoring		Third period	Ivan Kosorenkov (1) - 0:29
Julio Billia (18 saves / 21 shots)		Goalie stats	James Povall (13 saves / 16 shots); Tristan Côté-Cazenave (17 saves / 18 shots)

March 25	Chicoutimi Saguenéens	2 – 1	Victoriaville Tigres	Centre Georges-Vézina	Recap
7:41 - Nicolas Roy (2)		First period	Pascal Laberge (1) - pp - 17:07
No scoring		Second period	No scoring
18:29 - Nicolas Roy (3)		Third period	No scoring
Julio Billia (21 saves / 22 shots)		Goalie stats	Tristan Côté-Cazenave (24 saves / 26 shots)

March 28	Victoriaville Tigres	2 – 5	Chicoutimi Saguenéens	Colisée Desjardins	Recap
5:45 - Félix Lauzon (2)		First period	Brendan Hamelin (1) - 10:06; Zachary Lavigne (1) - 19:46
4:40 - Max Comtois (1)		Second period	Kelly Klima (2) - 18:01
No scoring		Third period	Antoine Marcoux (1) - 17:58; Joey Ratelle (1) - en - 19:28
Tristan Côté-Cazenave (27 saves / 31 shots)		Goalie stats	Julio Billia (24 saves / 26 shots)

March 29	Victoriaville Tigres	3 – 4	Chicoutimi Saguenéens	Colisée Desjardins	Recap
5:47 - Pascal Laberge (2); 12:47 - pp - Ivan Kosorenkov (2); 13:57 - Antoine Lessard (1)		First period	Joey Ratelle (2) - 13:40
No scoring		Second period	Joey Ratelle (3) - 16:54; Dmitry Zhukenov (2) - 19:58
No scoring		Third period	Nicolas Roy (4) - pp - 19:47
Tristan Côté-Cazenave (28 saves / 32 shots)		Goalie stats	Julio Billia (28 saves / 31 shots)

Chicoutimi wins series 4 – 0

== Quarter-finals ==
=== (1) Saint John Sea Dogs vs. (14) Val-d'Or Foreurs ===
April 7	Saint John Sea Dogs	2 – 1	OT	Val-d'Or Foreurs	Harbour Station	Recap
No scoring		First period		No scoring
No scoring		Second period		Alexis Pépin (5) - 3:25
6:46 - pp - Spencer Smallman (4)		Third period		No scoring
9:58 - Samuel Dove-McFalls (1)		First overtime period		No scoring
Callum Booth (13 saves / 14 shots)		Goalie stats		Étienne Montpetit (66 saves / 68 shots)

April 8	Saint John Sea Dogs	4 – 1	Val-d'Or Foreurs	Harbour Station	Recap
4:55 - Cédric Paré (1)		First period	No scoring
13:31 - pp - Julien Gauthier (2)		Second period	Simon Lafrance (2) - 10:05
11:43 - sh - Spencer Smallman (5); 17:17 - en - Mathieu Joseph (4)		Third period	No scoring
Callum Booth (17 saves / 18 shots)		Goalie stats	Étienne Montpetit (50 saves / 53 shots)

April 11	Val-d'Or Foreurs	3 – 7	Saint John Sea Dogs	Centre Air Creebec	Recap
3:16 - pp - David Henley (1); 5:47 - Ivan Kozlov (1)		First period	Cole Reginato (2) - 6:17; Joe Veleno (3) - pp - 19:10
9:28 - David Noël (2)		Second period	Mathieu Joseph (5) - 7:08
		Third period	Julien Gauthier (3) - 4:18; Mathieu Joseph (6) - 8:26; Mathieu Joseph (7) - en - 18:45; Kyle Ward (3) - 19:37
Étienne Montpetit (52 saves / 58 shots)		Goalie stats	Callum Booth (16 saves / 19 shots)

April 12	Val-d'Or Foreurs	1 – 7	Saint John Sea Dogs	Centre Air Creebec	Recap
19:12 - Charley Graaskamp (5)		First period	Joe Veleno (4) - 1:45; Simon Bourque (2) - 2:52; Spencer Smallman (6) - pp - 12:40
No scoring		Second period	Julien Gauthier (4) - 1:29; Spencer Smallman (7) - 13:02; Joe Veleno (5) - sh - 17:41
No scoring		Third period	Spencer Smallman (8) - 1:11
Étienne Montpetit (38 saves / 45 shots)		Goalie stats	Callum Booth (18 saves / 19 shots)

Saint John wins series 4 – 0

=== (2) Rouyn-Noranda Huskies vs. (8) Chicoutimi Saguenéens ===
April 7	Rouyn-Noranda Huskies	6 – 2	Chicoutimi Saguenéens	Aréna Iamgold	Recap
1:40 - pp - Lane Cormier (1); 2:14 - Manuel Wiederer (2)		First period	No scoring
7:35 - Gabriel Fontaine (4)		Second period	Jérémy Groleau (1) - 3:18
5:40 - J.C. Beaudin (3); 16:50 - sh - Peter Abbandonato (2); 17:23 - pp - J.C. Beaudin (4)		Third period	Dmitry Zhukenov (3) - 3:54
Samuel Harvey (24 saves / 26 shots)		Goalie stats	Julio Billia (31 saves / 37 shots)

April 8	Rouyn-Noranda Huskies	2 – 5	Chicoutimi Saguenéens	Aréna Iamgold	Recap
No scoring		First period	No scoring
2:54 - Peter Abbandonato (3); 15:01 - pp - Gabriel Fontaine (5)		Second period	Mark Bzowey (1) - 12:15
No scoring		Third period	Zachary Lavigne (2) - 4:08; Joey Ratelle (4) - 6:43; Dmitry Zhukenov (4) - pp - 14:08; Zachary Lavigne (3) - sh - en - 18:57
Olivier Tremblay (31 saves / 35 shots)		Goalie stats	Julio Billia (24 saves / 26 shots)

April 11	Chicoutimi Saguenéens	1 – 3	Rouyn-Noranda Huskies	Centre Georges-Vézina	Recap
No scoring		First period	J.C. Beaudin (5) - 14:15
No scoring		Second period	No scoring
12:34 - Nicolas Roy (5)		Third period	J.C. Beaudin (6) - 4:40; Peter Abbandonato (4) - en - 19:17
Julio Billia (22 saves / 24 shots)		Goalie stats	Samuel Harvey (17 saves / 18 shots)

April 12	Chicoutimi Saguenéens	6 – 1	Rouyn-Noranda Huskies	Centre Georges-Vézina	Recap
2:36 - Kelly Klima (3); 3:25 - Julien Carignan-Labbé (1)		First period	No scoring
2:24 - pp - Samuel Houde (1); 2:38 - Vincent Lapalme (1); 8:59 - Nicolas Roy (6)		Second period	No scoring
14:21 - pp - Frédéric Allard (1)		Third period	Rafaël Harvey-Pinard (1) - 10:42
Julio Billia (20 saves / 21 shots)		Goalie stats	Samuel Harvey (0 saves / 2 shots); Olivier Tremblay (20 saves / 24 shots)

April 14	Chicoutimi Saguenéens	3 – 1	Rouyn-Noranda Huskies	Centre Georges-Vézina	Recap
Frédéric Allard (2) - pp - 5:00		First period	No scoring
Olivier Galipeau (2) - pp - 6:17		Second period	No scoring
Dmitry Zhukenov (5) - 13:38		Third period	15:59 - pp - Alexandre Fortin (4)
Julio Billia (29 saves / 30 shots)		Goalie stats	Samuel Harvey (18 saves / 21 shots)

April 17	Rouyn-Noranda Huskies	9 – 2	Chicoutimi Saguenéens	Aréna Iamgold	Recap
Alexandre Fortin (5) - pp - 10:44		First period	15:47 - pp - Joey Ratelle (5)
Jérémy Lauzon (4) - 0:35; Gabriel Fontaine (6) - 3:31; Alexandre Fortin (6) - 4:53; Jérémy Lauzon (5) - 12:02; J.C. Beaudin (7) - 19:09		Second period	No scoring
Manuel Wiederer (3) - pp - 12:41; Philippe Myers (3) - pp - 15:18; Jacob Neveu (1) - pp - 16:38		Third period	2:01 - Brendan Hamelin (2)
Olivier Tremblay (30 saves / 32 shots)		Goalie stats	Julio Billia (16 saves / 21 shots); Xavier Potvin (11 saves / 15 shots)

April 18	Rouyn-Noranda Huskies	3 – 4	OT	Chicoutimi Saguenéens	Aréna Iamgold	Recap
12:25 - J.C. Beaudin (8)		First period		Kelly Klima (4) - 2:21
9:52 - Mathieu Boucher (4)		Second period		No scoring
0:20 - Manuel Wiederer (4)		Third period		Kelly Klima (5) - 10:00; Olivier Galipeau (3) - sh - 18:49
No scoring		First overtime period		Olivier Galipeau (4) - 4:22
Olivier Tremblay (24 saves / 28 shots)		Goalie stats		Julio Billia (29 saves / 32 shots)

Chicoutimi wins series 4 – 3

=== (4) Charlottetown Islanders vs. (7) Cape Breton Screaming Eagles ===
April 6	Charlottetown Islanders	4 – 1	Cape Breton Screaming Eagles	Eastlink Centre	Recap
No scoring		First period	Giovanni Fiore (5) - 7:41
1:24 - Daniel Sprong (3)		Second period	No scoring
3:21 - Kameron Kielly (3); 11:22 - pp - Carl Neill (1); 18:35 - en - Filip Chlapík (2)		Third period	No scoring
Mark Grametbauer (20 saves / 21 shots)		Goalie stats	Kevin Mandolese (38 saves / 41 shots)

April 8	Charlottetown Islanders	5 – 3	Cape Breton Screaming Eagles	Eastlink Centre	Recap
3:31 - pp - Daniel Sprong (4)		First period	No scoring
14:48 - pp - Daniel Sprong (5)		Second period	Jordan-Ty Fournier (5) - 3:20; Declan Smith (2) - 15:28
11:28 - Nicolas Meloche (2); 12:23 - Kameron Kielly (4); 18:56 - en - Adam Marsh (2)		Third period	Giovanni Fiore (6) - 4:15
Mark Grametbauer (37 saves / 40 shots)		Goalie stats	Kyle Jessiman (23 saves / 27 shots)

April 12	Cape Breton Screaming Eagles	3 – 4	OT	Charlottetown Islanders	Centre 200	Recap
		First period		Daniel Sprong (6) - pp - 19:46
12:09 - pp - Giovanni Fiore (7); 16:35 - Declan Smith (3); 18:38 - Giovanni Fiore (8)		Second period		William Bower (1) - 0:44; Dillon Boucher (3) -
No scoring		Third period		No scoring
No scoring		First overtime period		Kameron Kielly (5) - 4:11
Kevin Mandolese (32 saves / 36 shots)		Goalie stats		Mark Grametbauer (32 saves / 35 shots)

April 13	Cape Breton Screaming Eagles	2 – 5	Charlottetown Islanders	Centre 200	Recap
12:23 - sh - Declan Smith (4)		First period	Chris Chaddock (1) - 3:23; Alex Dostie (6) - 8:45
7:50 - Jordan-Ty Fournier (6)		Second period	Filip Chlapík (3) - 12:46
No scoring		Third period	Pascal Aquin (2) - 1:46; Daniel Sprong (7) - 16:25
Kyle Jessiman (22 saves / 27 shots)		Goalie stats	Mark Grametbauer (38 saves / 40 shots)

Charlottetown wins series 4 – 0

=== (5) Blainville-Boisbriand Armada vs. (6) Acadie–Bathurst Titan ===
April 6	Blainville-Boisbriand Armada	6 – 2	Acadie–Bathurst Titan	Centre d'Excellence Sports Rousseau	Recap
2:44 - Miguel Picard (2); 3:32 - Yvan Mongo (2); 7:34 - Alex Barré-Boulet (4); 7:48 - Joël Teasdale (2)		First period	Vladimir Kuznetsov (6) - pp - 2:28
No scoring		Second period	No scoring
0:37 - Yvan Mongo (3); 19:01 - en - Pierre-Luc Dubois (2)		Third period	Jeffrey Viel (4) - 4:27
Sam Montembeault (24 saves / 26 shots)		Goalie stats	Anthony Dumont-Bouchard (1 save / 3 shots); Reilly Pickard (26 saves / 29 shots)

April 8	Blainville-Boisbriand Armada	3 – 4	Acadie–Bathurst Titan	Centre d'Excellence Sports Rousseau	Recap
1:41 - Alex Barré-Boulet (5)		First period	No scoring
No scoring		Second period	Jeffrey Viel (5) - pp - 8:45; Aaron Brisebois (1) - 13:38; Jeffrey Viel (6) - 18:14
1:53 - Connor Bramwell (3); 19:26 - Alex Barré-Boulet (6)		Third period	Jeffrey Viel (7) - 18:11
Sam Montembeault (33 saves / 37 shots)		Goalie stats	Reilly Pickard (28 saves / 31 shots)

April 11	Acadie–Bathurst Titan	4 – 1	Blainville-Boisbriand Armada	K. C. Irving Regional Centre	Recap
1:34 - pp - Jeffrey Viel (8); 17:03 - Vladimir Kuznetsov (7)		First period	No scoring
11:17 - pp - Jordan Maher (3)		Second period	Yvan Mongo (4) - 19:37
18:10 - en - Rodrigo Ābols (4)		Third period	No scoring
Reilly Pickard (34 saves / 35 shots)		Goalie stats	Francis Leclerc (25 saves / 28 shots)

April 12	Acadie–Bathurst Titan	7 – 2	Blainville-Boisbriand Armada	K. C. Irving Regional Centre	Recap
No scoring		First period	No scoring
1:39 - Christophe Boivin (4); 8:35 - Adam Holwell (2); 13:21 - pp - Dawson Theede (3)		Second period	No scoring
5:26 - Antoine Morand (2); 7:03 - Rodrigo Ābols (5); 15:06 - pp - Jeffrey Viel (9); 19:28 - pp - Vladimir Kuznetsov (8)		Third period	Pierre-Luc Dubois (3) - 0:53; Connor Bramwell (4) - pp - 9:05
Reilly Pickard (20 saves / 22 shots)		Goalie stats	Francis Leclerc (25 saves / 32 shots)

April 14	Acadie–Bathurst Titan	1 – 5	Blainville-Boisbriand Armada	K. C. Irving Regional Centre	Recap
No scoring		First period	1:21 - Connor Bramwell (5)
No scoring		Second period	7:31 - pp - Alex Barré-Boulet (7); 8:01 - Connor Bramwell (6); 15:16 - pp - T.J. Melancon (1)
Christophe Boivin (5) - pp - 13:48		Third period	17:15 - en - Charlie Roy (1)
Reilly Pickard (23 saves / 27 shots); Anthony Dumont-Bouchard (13 saves / 13 shots)		Goalie stats	Sam Montembeault (30 saves / 31 shots)

April 17	Blainville-Boisbriand Armada	4 – 1	Acadie–Bathurst Titan	Centre d'Excellence Sports Rousseau	Recap
Pierre-Luc Dubois (4) - 17:17		First period	No scoring
T.J. Melancon (2) - pp - 1:38		Second period	14:53 - Jeffrey Viel (10)
Pierre-Luc Dubois (5) - pp - 17:03; Yvan Mongo (5) - pp - 19:12		Third period	No scoring
Sam Montembeault (20 saves / 21 shots)		Goalie stats	Reilly Pickard (28 saves / 32 shots)

April 18	Blainville-Boisbriand Armada	7 – 1	Acadie–Bathurst Titan	Centre d'Excellence Sports Rousseau	Recap
0:43 - Alex Barré-Boulet (8); 16:04 - Joël Teasdale (3)		First period	No scoring
0:46 - Alex Barré-Boulet (9); 13:37 - pp - Alexandre Alain (4); 15:29 - pp - Alex Barré-Boulet (10); 18:03 - sh - Joël Teasdale (4)		Second period	No scoring
3:35 - Yvan Mongo (6)		Third period	Zach Malatesta (1) - pp - 8:02
Sam Montembeault (24 saves / 25 shots); Francis Leclerc (1 save / 1 shot)		Goalie stats	Anthony Dumont-Bouchard (29 saves / 36 shots)

Blainville-Boisbriand wins series 4 – 3

== Semi-finals ==
=== (1) Saint John Sea Dogs vs. (8) Chicoutimi Saguenéens ===
April 21	Saint John Sea Dogs	4 – 1	Chicoutimi Saguenéens	Harbour Station	Recap
No scoring		First period	No scoring
3:44 - Simon Bourque (3); 6:37 - Cole Reginato (3); 7:54 - Mathieu Joseph (8); 19:43 - Julien Gauthier (5)		Second period	Nicolas Roy (7) - 16:43
No scoring		Third period	No scoring
Callum Booth (21 saves / 22 shots)		Goalie stats	Julio Billia (35 saves / 39 shots)

April 22	Saint John Sea Dogs	2 – 3	2OT	Chicoutimi Saguenéens	Harbour Station	Recap
12:43 - Julien Gauthier (6); 13:16 - Matthew Highmore (3)		First period		No scoring
No scoring		Second period		Joey Ratelle (6) - pp - 6:28
No scoring		Third period		Joey Ratelle (7) - pp - 15:39
No scoring		Second overtime period		Nicolas Roy (8) - pp - 5:12
Callum Booth (51 saves / 54 shots)		Goalie stats		Julio Billia (52 saves / 54 shots)

April 25	Chicoutimi Saguenéens	0 – 5	Saint John Sea Dogs	Centre Georges-Vézina	Recap
No scoring		First period	Bokondji Imama (4) - 3:30
No scoring		Second period	No scoring
No scoring		Third period	Bokondji Imama (5) - 7:25; Joe Veleno (6) - 8:08; Samuel Dove-McFalls (2) - 8:14; Mathieu Joseph (9) - 16:28
Julio Billia (24 saves / 29 shots)		Goalie stats	Callum Booth (25 saves / 25 shots)

April 26	Chicoutimi Saguenéens	4 – 3	Saint John Sea Dogs	Centre Georges-Vézina	Recap
13:17 - Mark Bzowey (2)		First period	No scoring
11:06 - Brendan Hamelin (3)		Second period	Mathieu Joseph (10) - pp - 4:04
2:38 - Brendan Hamelin (4); 19:46 - Joey Ratelle (8)		Third period	Bokondji Imama (6) - 3:15; Mathieu Joseph (11) - sh - 10:34
Julio Billia (30 saves / 33 shots)		Goalie stats	Callum Booth (19 saves / 23 shots)

April 28	Saint John Sea Dogs	4 – 0	Chicoutimi Saguenéens	Harbour Station	Recap
No scoring		First period	No scoring
13:19 - Jakub Zbořil (2); 15:45 - Nathan Noel (1)		Second period	No scoring
5:46 - Thomas Chabot (4); 10:09 - Joe Veleno (7)		Third period	No scoring
Callum Booth (23 saves / 23 shots)		Goalie stats	Julio Billia (48 saves / 52 shots)

April 30	Chicoutimi Saguenéens	5 – 6	Saint John Sea Dogs	Centre Georges-Vézina	Recap
10:32 - pp - Frédéric Allard (3); 13:00 - Joey Ratelle (9)		First period	Joe Veleno (8) - 18:35
No scoring		Second period	Jakub Zbořil (3) - 0:24; Julien Gauthier (7) - pp - 13:38
0:25 - Frédéric Allard (4); 1:37 - Dmitry Zhukenov (6); 4:22 - pp - Joey Ratelle (10)		Third period	Thomas Chabot (5) - 8:18; Samuel Dove-McFalls (3) - 10:07; Bokondji Imama (7) - 14:45
Julio Billia (28 saves / 34 shots)		Goalie stats	Callum Booth (16 saves / 21 shots)

Saint John wins series 4 – 2

=== (4) Charlottetown Islanders vs. (5) Blainville-Boisbriand Armada ===
April 21	Charlottetown Islanders	3 – 0	Blainville-Boisbriand Armada	Eastlink Centre	Recap
No scoring		First period	No scoring
1:13 - pp - Kameron Kielly (6); 6:15 - pp - Alex Dostie (7)		Second period	No scoring
17:58 - en - Dillon Boucher (4)		Third period	No scoring
Mark Grametbauer (37 saves / 37 shots)		Goalie stats	Sam Montembeault (26 saves / 28 shots)

April 22	Charlottetown Islanders	4 – 5	Blainville-Boisbriand Armada	Eastlink Centre	Recap
5:00 - pp - Daniel Sprong (8)		First period	Tobie Paquette-Bisson (1) - 2:09
7:55 - Kameron Kielly (7); 19:34 - Daniel Sprong (9)		Second period	Pierre-Luc Dubois (6) - pp - 10:24
0:54 - Pierre-Olivier Joseph (1)		Third period	Alex Barré-Boulet (11) - 8:34; Alex Barré-Boulet (12) - pp - 15:33; Morgan Adams-Moisan (2) - 19:06
Mark Grametbauer (30 saves / 35 shots)		Goalie stats	Sam Montembeault (15 saves / 19 shots)

April 25	Blainville-Boisbriand Armada	5 – 4	Charlottetown Islanders	Centre d'Excellence Sports Rousseau	Recap
11:54 - Pascal Corbeil (3); 19:30 - T.J. Melancon (3)		First period	Adam Marsh (3) - 14:37
3:02 - pp - Guillaume Beaudoin (1); 16:08 - pp - Alexander Katerinakis (1); 18:26 - pp - Joël Teasdale (5)		Second period	Filip Chlapík (4) - 0:12
No scoring		Third period	Nicolas Meloche (3) - 8:04; Filip Chlapík (5) - 13:39
Sam Montembeault (19 saves / 23 shots)		Goalie stats	Mark Grametbauer (14 saves / 19 shots); Matthew Welsh (7 saves / 7 shots)

April 26	Blainville-Boisbriand Armada	4 – 2	Charlottetown Islanders	Centre d'Excellence Sports Rousseau	Recap
3:16 - pp - Pierre-Luc Dubois (7); 7:10 - Shaun Miller (1)		First period	No scoring
0:24 - sh - Alex Barré-Boulet (13)		Second period	Carl Neill (2) - 12:21
13:38 - pp - Pierre-Luc Dubois (8)		Third period	Alex Dostie (8) - 18:37
Sam Montembeault (34 saves / 36 shots)		Goalie stats	Matthew Welsh (16 saves / 20 shots)

April 29	Charlottetown Islanders	2 – 5	Blainville-Boisbriand Armada	Eastlink Centre	Recap
3:37 - Matthew Grouchy (2)		First period	No scoring
No scoring		Second period	Alexandre Alain (5) - 2:51; Alexander Katerinakis (2) - 18:32
9:25 - pp - Adam Marsh (4)		Third period	Alexandre Alain (6) - pp - 0:38; Anthony Poulin (1) - 17:22; Alex Barré-Boulet (14) - 19:11
Mark Grametbauer (14 saves / 19 shots)		Goalie stats	Sam Montembeault (31 saves / 33 shots)

Blainville-Boisbriand wins series 4 – 1

== President's Cup Finals ==
=== (1) Saint John Sea Dogs vs. (5) Blainville-Boisbriand Armada ===
May 5	Saint John Sea Dogs	6 – 3	Blainville-Boisbriand Armada	Harbour Station	Recap
5:13 - pp - Julien Gauthier (8); 7:25 - sh - Matthew Highmore (4)		First period	T.J. Melancon (4) - 18:00
2:52 - Matthew Highmore (5); 11:13 - Julien Gauthier (9); 19:45 - pp - Mathieu Joseph (12)		Second period	T.J. Melancon (5) - 10:55; Morgan Adams-Moisan (3) - 16:53
17:38 - en - Nathan Noel (2)		Third period	No scoring
Callum Booth (24 saves / 27 shots)		Goalie stats	Sam Montembeault (22 saves / 27 shots)

May 6	Saint John Sea Dogs	4 – 0	Blainville-Boisbriand Armada	Harbour Station	Recap
19:23 - Julien Gauthier (10); 19:40 - Mathieu Joseph (13)		First period	No scoring
No scoring		Second period	No scoring
3:53 - Spencer Smallman (9); 5:26 - Julien Gauthier (11)		Third period	No scoring
Callum Booth (27 saves / 27 shots)		Goalie stats	Sam Montembeault (33 saves / 37 shots)

May 9	Blainville-Boisbriand Armada	0 – 2	Saint John Sea Dogs	Centre d'Excellence Sports Rousseau	Recap
No scoring		First period	No scoring
No scoring		Second period	Samuel Dove-McFalls (4) - 12:28
No scoring		Third period	Samuel Dove-McFalls (5) - en - 19:44
Sam Montembeault (17 saves / 18 shots)		Goalie stats	Callum Booth (22 saves / 22 shots)

May 10	Blainville-Boisbriand Armada	1 – 5	Saint John Sea Dogs	Centre d'Excellence Sports Rousseau	Recap
No scoring		First period	Bokondji Imama (8) - 7:29; Spencer Smallman (10) - pp - 17:38
13:53 - pp - Pierre-Luc Dubois (9)		Second period	Simon Bourque (4) - 15:21
No scoring		Third period	Spencer Smallman (11) - pp - 5:16; Matthew Highmore (6) - 15:07
Sam Montembeault (29 saves / 34 shots)		Goalie stats	Callum Booth (20 saves / 21 shots)

Saint John wins series 4 – 0

== Playoff leading scorers ==
Note: GP = Games played; G = Goals; A = Assists; Pts = Points; PIM = Penalty minutes

Player	Team	GP	G	A	Pts	PIM
Mathieu Joseph	Saint John Sea Dogs	18	13	19	32	14
Alex Barré-Boulet	Blainville-Boisbriand Armada	20	14	17	31	10
Matthew Highmore	Saint John Sea Dogs	18	6	18	24	14
Thomas Chabot	Saint John Sea Dogs	18	5	18	23	12
Spencer Smallman	Saint John Sea Dogs	18	11	11	22	2
Pierre-Luc Dubois	Blainville-Boisbriand Armada	19	9	13	22	26
Nicolas Roy	Chicoutimi Saguenéens	17	8	13	21	14
Dmitry Zhukenov	Chicoutimi Saguenéens	17	6	15	21	14
Daniel Sprong	Charlottetown Islanders	12	9	11	20	17
J.C. Beaudin	Rouyn-Noranda Huskies	13	8	12	20	2

== Playoff leading goaltenders ==
Note: GP = Games played; Mins = Minutes played; W = Wins; L = Losses: OTL = Overtime losses; SL = Shootout losses; GA = Goals Allowed; SO = Shutouts; GAA = Goals against average

Player	Team	GP	Mins	W	L	GA	SO	Sv%	GAA
Callum Booth	Saint John Sea Dogs	18	1115:10	16	2	31	4	.923	1.67
Sam Montembeault	Blainville-Boisbriand Armada	18	1017:07	12	6	42	0	.910	2.35
Mark Grametbauer	Charlottetown Islanders	12	702:14	9	3	30	1	.913	2.56
Olivier Tremblay	Rouyn-Noranda Huskies	8	456:46	4	3	21	1	.900	2.76
Tristan Bérubé	Gatineau Olympiques	6	315:31	3	2	15	0	.917	2.85

== Trophies and awards ==
- President's Cup – Playoff Champions: Saint John Sea Dogs
- Jean Rougeau Trophy – Regular Season Champions: Saint John Sea Dogs
- Luc Robitaille Trophy – Team with the best goals for average: Charlottetown Islanders
- Robert Lebel Trophy – Team with best GAA: Blainville-Boisbriand Armada

Player

- Michel Brière Memorial Trophy – Most Valuable Player: Vitalii Abramov, Gatineau Olympiques
- Jean Béliveau Trophy – Top Scorer: Vitalii Abramov, Gatineau Olympiques
- Guy Lafleur Trophy – Playoff MVP: Thomas Chabot, Saint John Sea Dogs
- Jacques Plante Memorial Trophy – Top Goaltender: Francis Leclerc, Blainville-Boisbriand Armada
- Guy Carbonneau Trophy – Best Defensive Forward: Nicolas Roy, Chicoutimi Saguenéens
- Emile Bouchard Trophy – Defenceman of the Year: Thomas Chabot, Saint John Sea Dogs
- Kevin Lowe Trophy – Best Defensive Defenceman: Zachary Lauzon, Rouyn-Noranda Huskies
- Michael Bossy Trophy – Top Prospect: Nico Hischier, Halifax Mooseheads
- RDS Cup – Rookie of the Year: Nico Hischier, Halifax Mooseheads
- Michel Bergeron Trophy – Offensive Rookie of the Year: Nico Hischier, Halifax Mooseheads
- Raymond Lagacé Trophy – Defensive Rookie of the Year: Jared McIsaac, Halifax Mooseheads
- Frank J. Selke Memorial Trophy – Most sportsmanlike player: Hugo Roy, Sherbrooke Phoenix
- QMJHL Humanitarian of the Year – Humanitarian of the Year: Samuel Labarge, Rimouski Océanic
- Marcel Robert Trophy – Best Scholastic Player: Antoine Samuel, Baie-Comeau Drakkar
- Paul Dumont Trophy – Personality of the Year: Thomas Chabot, Saint John Sea Dogs

Executive

- Ron Lapointe Trophy – Coach of the Year: Danny Flynn, Saint John Sea Dogs
- Maurice Filion Trophy – General Manager of the Year: Joël Bouchard, Blainville-Boisbriand Armada
- John Horman Trophy – Executive of the Year: Serge Proulx, Chicoutimi Saguenéens
- Jean Sawyer Trophy – Marketing Director of the Year: Saint John Sea Dogs

=== All-Star teams ===
First All-Star Team:

- Mikhail Denisov, Goaltender, Shawinigan Cataractes
- Thomas Chabot, Defenceman, Saint John Sea Dogs
- Samuel Girard, Defenceman, Shawinigan Cataractes
- Nicolas Roy, Centre, Chicoutimi Saguenéens
- Giovanni Fiore, Left Wing, Cape Breton Screaming Eagles
- Vitalii Abramov, Right Wing, Gatineau Olympiques

Second All-Star Team:

- Sam Montembeault, Goaltender, Blainville-Boisbriand Armada
- Guillaume Brisebois, Defenceman, Charlottetown Islanders
- Simon Bourque, Defenceman, Saint John Sea Dogs
- Filip Chlapik, Centre, Charlottetown Islanders
- Christophe Boivin, Left Wing, Acadie–Bathurst Titan
- Mathieu Joseph, Right Wing, Saint John Sea Dogs

All-Rookie Team:

- Alexis Gravel, Goaltender, Halifax Mooseheads
- Jared McIsaac, Defenceman, Halifax Mooseheads
- Xavier Bouchard, Defenceman, Baie-Comeau Drakkar
- Nico Hischier, Centre, Halifax Mooseheads
- Anderson Macdonald, Left Wing, Sherbrooke Phoenix
- Ivan Kosorenkov, Right Wing, Victoriaville Tigres

== See also ==
- List of QMJHL seasons
- 2016 in ice hockey
- 2017 in ice hockey
- 2016–17 OHL season
- 2016–17 WHL season
- 2017 Memorial Cup

Preceded by 2016–17 QMJHL season	QMJHL seasons	Succeeded by 2017–18 QMJHL season
