= Mathieu Joseph =

Canadian ice hockey player (born 1997)

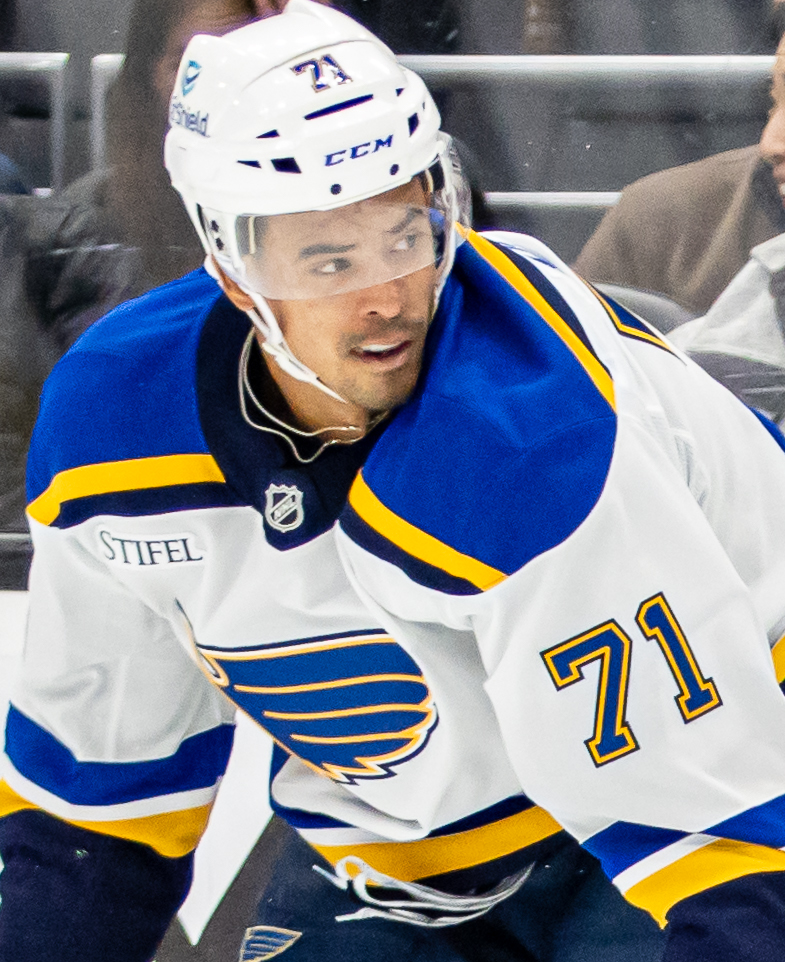
- Joseph with the St. Louis Blues in 2024
- Born: February 9, 1997 (age 29) Laval, Quebec, Canada
- Height: 6 ft 1 in (185 cm)
- Weight: 188 lb (85 kg; 13 st 6 lb)
- Position: Winger
- Shoots: Left
- NHL team Former teams: Edmonton Oilers; Tampa Bay Lightning; Ottawa Senators; St. Louis Blues; Los Angeles Kings
- National team: Canada
- NHL draft: 120th overall, 2015; Tampa Bay Lightning
- Playing career: 2017–present

Mathieu Joseph (born February 9, 1997) is a Canadian professional ice hockey player who is a winger for the Edmonton Oilers of the National Hockey League (NHL). He was selected by the Tampa Bay Lightning in the fourth round, 120th overall, of the 2015 NHL entry draft. Joseph won the Stanley Cup in back-to-back years with the Lightning in 2020 and 2021. He has also played in the NHL for the Ottawa Senators, St. Louis Blues, and Los Angeles Kings.

== Early life ==
Joseph was born on February 9, 1997, in Laval, Quebec, Canada to Frantzi Joseph and France Taillon. His father played and coached ice hockey for many years, while his mother was a competitive athlete in her youth. His father is of Haitian descent. His younger brother Pierre-Olivier is a defenceman for the Carolina Hurricanes.

== Playing career ==
=== Amateur ===
Joseph was selected by the Saint John Sea Dogs in the 2013 Quebec Major Junior Hockey League (QMJHL) entry draft in the third round, 51st overall. He began to play for the Sea Dogs at the midway point of the 2013–14 season. His first goal with the team came in a 2–0 win over the Val-d'Or Foreurs. In his second season with the Sea Dogs, Joseph became the sixth player in team history to score five points in a regular season game. He also finished fourth in team scoring that season with 42 points. On June 27, 2015, the Tampa Bay Lightning of the National Hockey League (NHL) selected Joseph in the fourth round, 120th overall, of the 2015 NHL entry draft.

On December 24, 2016, the Lightning signed Joseph to a three-year, entry-level contract. At the time of his signing, Joseph had played in 176 career games with the Sea Dogs during which he scored 80 goals and 171 points. During the 2016–17 playoffs, Joseph was named Canadian Hockey League Player of the Week after scoring two goals and three assists in two games. Joseph went on to help the Sea Dogs capture the President's Cup as QMJHL champion over the Blainville-Boisbriand Armada in a four-game sweep. The Sea Dogs went on to lose in the semifinals to the Ontario Hockey League's Erie Otters in the 2017 Memorial Cup. He was named to the QMJHL second All-Star team in 2017.

=== Professional ===
==== Tampa Bay Lightning ====
Joseph began his professional career in the 2017–18 season with the Tampa Bay Lightning's American Hockey League (AHL) affiliate, the Syracuse Crunch. He had a strong rookie season with the Crunch, including being named CCM/AHL Rookie of the Month for March 2018, during which he scored four goals and 10 assists for 14 points over 12 games; he also had a seven-game scoring streak within that span. Joseph finished the season with 15 goals and 38 assists for 53 points, leading the Crunch in regular season assists and points. Joseph also had three goals and seven points in seven Calder Cup playoff games.

At the conclusion of the Lightning's training camp ahead of the 2018–19 season, Joseph found out he had made the opening night roster from general manager Julien BriseBois—before boarding the team's charter plane after a 3–2 Lightning win against the Florida Panthers, BriseBois informed Joseph he had made the roster. On October 6, 2018, Joseph made his NHL debut in a 2–1 Lightning win against the Florida Panthers. On October 16, he scored his first career NHL assist and point in a 4–2 Lightning win over the visiting Carolina Hurricanes. On November 4, Joseph scored his first NHL goal in a 4–3 overtime win over the Ottawa Senators.

Joseph was one of the eight players called up to the Lightning for their training camp prior to the 2020 Stanley Cup playoffs. Following the murder of George Floyd and shooting of Jacob Blake, Joseph worked alongside goaltender Curtis McElhinney in creating a mask to represent social justice. The end product featured Black athletes who were trailblazers in the fight for equality, a fist flanked by the words Black Lives Matter and a Martin Luther King Jr. quote. Though Joseph was part of the Tampa Bay team during the regular season, he did not play in the playoffs. The Lightning won the Stanley Cup, defeating the Dallas Stars four games to two and due to his play during the season, got his name engraved on the cup. The following season, Joseph played a larger role with the Lightning and won a second Stanley Cup defeating his hometown Montreal Canadiens in the 2021 Stanley Cup Final series.

==== Ottawa Senators ====
On March 20, 2022, just a day before the trade deadline, Joseph was traded along with a 2024 fourth-round draft pick by Tampa Bay to the Ottawa Senators in exchange for forward Nick Paul. He debuted for the Senators on March 22 in a 3–0 loss to the New York Islanders. On April 1, Joseph registered his first hat-trick in a 5–2 win over the Detroit Red Wings. In 11 games with the Senators, Joseph recorded four goals and 12 points.

As a restricted free agent in the following off-season, Joseph was re-signed by the Senators to a four-year, $11.8 million contract extension on July 29. During the 2022–23 season, Joseph played on the third line. On November 15, Joseph was fined $5,000 by the league for a high-sticking incident against Sebastian Aho of the New York Islanders. On December 8, Joseph suffered an injury against the Dallas Stars that kept him out of the lineup until January 19, 2023. He suffered a second significant injury later in the season during a game versus the Calgary Flames on March 12. He returned to the lineup before the end of the season.

In the 2023–24 season, Joseph played up and down the lineup, and was used in all situations. He had a three-point night on November 8, 2023 in a 6–3 win over the Toronto Maple Leafs. On February 20, 2024, Joseph scored twice against the Lightning in 4–2 win for Ottawa. He finished the season with 11 goals and 35 points in 72 games.

==== St. Louis Blues ====
On July 2, 2024, Joseph was traded to the St. Louis Blues along with a 2025 third-round draft pick for future considerations. He made his Blues debut on opening of the team's 2024–25 season on October 8, against the Seattle Kraken. He was placed on the team's third line alongside Brayden Schenn and Kasperi Kapanen. On October 11, in a game against the Vegas Golden Knights, Joseph and his brother Pierre-Olivier became the seventh set of brothers to dress for the Blues. Four days later on October 15, Joseph recorded his first goal for St. Louis in a 4–1 loss to the Minnesota Wild. He found himself in and out of the lineup throughout most of the season, tallying 14 points in 60 games. The Blues qualified for the playoffs and faced the league-leading Winnipeg Jets in the opening round. Joseph made his Blues' playoff debut in game one, but was a healthy scratch in games two through five. He returned to the lineup in game six. He scored his first goal in game seven, but ultimately, the Blues were eliminated by the Jets.

He began the 2025–26 season with the Blues, making 39 appearances, scoring two goals and 11 points. However, he was placed on waivers to make room on the roster for Dylan Holloway who was returning from injury on February 26, 2026. He cleared waivers and was assigned to St. Louis' AHL affiliate, the Springfield Thunderbirds. He played in two games with Springfield, scoring one goal. On March 5, Joseph was waived again by the Blues with the intent to terminate his contract; he subsequently cleared waivers and became an unrestricted free agent the following day.

==== Los Angeles Kings ====
Upon clearing waivers, Joseph signed a one-year contract for the remainder of the 2025–26 season with the Los Angeles Kings. He made 12 appearances with the Kings, going scoreless. The Kings made the 2026 Stanley Cup playoffs and Joseph made two appearances, going scoreless.

==== Edmonton Oilers ====
As a free agent from the Kings, Joseph joined his fifth NHL club by agreeing to a one-year, $1 million contract with the Edmonton Oilers for the 2026–27 season on July 1, 2026.

== International play ==
Medal record

Men's ice hockey

Representing Canada

World Championships
Silver medal – second place	2019 Slovakia	

World Junior Championships
Silver medal – second place	2017 Canada	

Joseph was selected for Canada's junior team for the 2017 World Junior Championships. He helped Canada win the silver medal, scoring in the final, only to lose to the United States in a shootout, 5–4. On April 29, 2019, Joseph was named to make his senior debut for Canada at the 2019 World Championship. He helped Canada progress through to the playoff rounds before losing the final to Finland to finish with the silver medal on May 26, 2019. Joseph finished the tournament posting one goal and one assist in 10 games.

== Career statistics ==
=== Regular season and playoffs ===
			Regular season					Playoffs
Season	Team	League	GP	G	A	Pts	PIM	GP	G	A	Pts	PIM
2013–14	Saint John Sea Dogs	QMJHL	30	1	10	11	10	—	—	—	—	—
2014–15	Saint John Sea Dogs	QMJHL	59	21	21	42	46	5	1	2	3	4
2015–16	Saint John Sea Dogs	QMJHL	58	33	40	73	57	5	5	2	7	8
2016–17	Saint John Sea Dogs	QMJHL	54	36	44	80	57	18	13	19	32	14
2017–18	Syracuse Crunch	AHL	70	15	38	53	41	7	3	4	7	6
2018–19	Tampa Bay Lightning	NHL	70	13	13	26	26	4	0	0	0	0
2019–20	Tampa Bay Lightning	NHL	37	4	3	7	16	—	—	—	—	—
2019–20	Syracuse Crunch	AHL	29	6	15	21	14	—	—	—	—	—
2020–21	Tampa Bay Lightning	NHL	56	12	7	19	10	6	0	2	2	0
2021–22	Tampa Bay Lightning	NHL	58	8	10	18	23	—	—	—	—	—
2021–22	Ottawa Senators	NHL	11	4	8	12	6	—	—	—	—	—
2022–23	Ottawa Senators	NHL	56	3	15	18	36	—	—	—	—	—
2023–24	Ottawa Senators	NHL	72	11	24	35	51	—	—	—	—	—
2024–25	St. Louis Blues	NHL	60	4	10	14	28	3	1	0	1	10
2025–26	St. Louis Blues	NHL	39	2	9	11	4	—	—	—	—	—
2025–26	Springfield Thunderbirds	AHL	2	1	0	1	0	—	—	—	—	—
2025–26	Los Angeles Kings	NHL	12	0	0	0	5	2	0	0	0	2
NHL totals			471	61	99	160	205	15	1	2	3	12

=== International ===
Year	Team	Event	Result	GP	G	A	Pts	PIM
2017	Canada	WJC	2nd place, silver medalist(s)	7	1	4	5	0
2019	Canada	WC	2nd place, silver medalist(s)	10	1	1	2	2
Junior totals				7	1	4	5	0
Senior totals				10	1	1	2	2

== Awards and honours ==
Award	Year	Ref
QMJHL
Second All-Star Team	2017	
President's Cup champion	2017	
NHL
Stanley Cup champion	2020, 2021	
