= Giovanni Fiore =

Canadian professional ice hockey centre

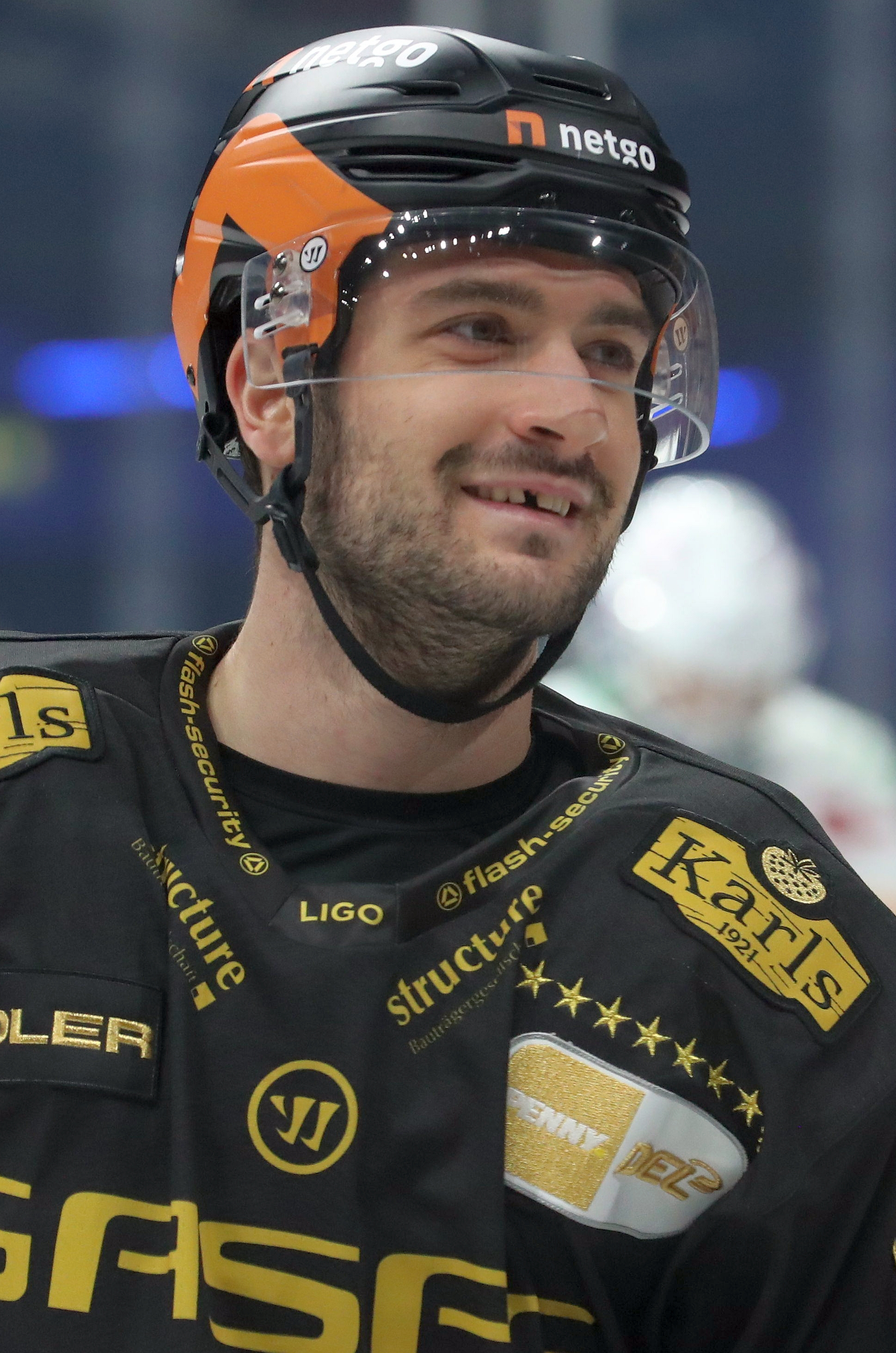
- Fiore with the Eisbären Berlin in 2022
- Born: August 13, 1996 (age 30) Laval, Quebec, Canada
- Height: 6 ft 1 in (185 cm)
- Weight: 194 lb (88 kg; 13 st 12 lb)
- Position: Left wing
- Shoots: Left
- KHL team Former teams: Lokomotiv Yaroslavl; Anaheim Ducks; Eisbären Berlin; Admiral Vladivostok; Avangard Omsk
- NHL draft: Undrafted
- Playing career: 2017–present

Giovanni Fiore (born August 13, 1996) is a Canadian professional ice hockey centre who plays for Lokomotiv Yaroslavl of the Kontinental Hockey League (KHL).

== Playing career ==
Fiore played minor ice hockey with the Laval Patriotes, and participated in the 2009 Quebec International Pee-Wee Hockey Tournament with them. He later played midget hockey in the QMAAA with the Laval-Montréal Rousseau Royal before embarking on major junior hockey in the Quebec Major Junior Hockey League with the Acadie-Bathurst Titan, Drummondville Voltigeurs, Shawinigan Cataractes and the Cape Breton Screaming Eagles.

Undrafted, and after five seasons in the QMJHL, Fiore signed his first professional contract in agreeing to a three-year, entry-level contract with the Anaheim Ducks on April 19, 2017.

Through an impressive first training camp with the Ducks, Fiore was amongst the last cuts re-assigned to AHL affiliate, the San Diego Gulls, to begin the 2017–18 season. On October 5, 2017, he was soon recalled to the Ducks and later made his NHL debut in a 3–2 overtime defeat to the Philadelphia Flyers on October 7, 2017. After making his solitary appearance for the Ducks, he was re-assigned to AHL affiliate, the San Diego Gulls, for the remainder of the season, collecting 18 goals and 30 points in 65 games.

In the following 2018–19 season, Fiore continued in the AHL with the Gulls and contributed with 11 points in 23 games before he was traded by the Ducks to the Arizona Coyotes in exchange for Trevor Murphy on December 28, 2018. He was immediately re-assigned to continue in the AHL with the Tucson Roadrunners.

Approaching the final year of his contract with the Coyotes in the 2019–20 season, Fiore was unable to impress through pre-season and was re-assigned by Arizona to their secondary affiliate, the Rapid City Rush of the ECHL. Fiore recorded 29 points through 24 games in the ECHL without recall to the AHL. On December 13, 2019, Fiore was placed on unconditional waivers and mutually released from his contract with the Arizona Coyotes. On December 20, 2019, he returned to the AHL after he was signed on a professional try-out contract with the Toronto Marlies, affiliate to the Toronto Maple Leafs. Fiore was unable to make an impact with the Marlies, posting 1 goal in just 4 games before leaving the club to sign a PTO with fellow AHL club, the Ontario Reign, on February 3, 2020. Fiore registered 3 goals in 12 contests with the Reign before the remainder of the season was cancelled due to the COVID-19 pandemic.

As a free agent, Fiore opted to pursue a career abroad, signing his first European contract in agreeing to a one-year for the remainder of the 2020–21 season with German club, Eisbären Berlin of the DEL, on December 3, 2020.

Helping capture the DEL Championship in his first two seasons in Berlin, Fiore returned for his third year with club in the 2022–23 season. Despite contributing with his highest offensive DEL totals with 21 goals and 36 points through 55 regular season games, Eisbären failed to qualify for the playoffs for the first time in 22 seasons. He left the club following the conclusion of his contract on 16 March 2023.

As a free agent, he opted to move to Russia for the 2023–24 season after securing a one-year contract with Admiral Vladivostok of the KHL on June 22, 2023.

After two seasons with Avangard Omsk, Fiore as a free agent opted to continue in the KHL, agreeing to a two-year contract with two-time reigning champions Lokomotiv Yaroslavl on July 1, 2026.

== Career statistics ==
			Regular season					Playoffs
Season	Team	League	GP	G	A	Pts	PIM	GP	G	A	Pts	PIM
2011–12	Laval-Montréal Rousseau Royal	QMAAA	12	3	3	6	4	—	—	—	—	—
2012–13	Laval-Montréal Rousseau Royal	QMAAA	30	18	18	36	14	—	—	—	—	—
2012–13	Acadie-Bathurst Titan	QMJHL	3	0	1	1	0	—	—	—	—	—
2012–13	Drummondville Voltigeurs	QMJHL	26	1	1	2	6	3	0	0	0	0
2013–14	Drummondville Voltigeurs	QMJHL	34	4	8	12	19	—	—	—	—	—
2013–14	Shawinigan Cataractes	QMJHL	27	6	7	13	4	4	0	0	0	2
2014–15	Shawinigan Cataractes	QMJHL	65	23	21	44	46	7	2	3	5	4
2015–16	Shawinigan Cataractes	QMJHL	39	13	17	30	28	—	—	—	—	—
2015–16	Cape Breton Screaming Eagles	QMJHL	26	15	17	32	8	13	8	7	15	8
2016–17	Cape Breton Screaming Eagles	QMJHL	61	52	38	90	42	11	8	4	12	10
2017–18	Anaheim Ducks	NHL	1	0	0	0	0	—	—	—	—	—
2017–18	San Diego Gulls	AHL	65	18	12	30	21	—	—	—	—	—
2018–19	San Diego Gulls	AHL	23	6	5	11	8	—	—	—	—	—
2018–19	Tucson Roadrunners	AHL	30	4	3	7	6	—	—	—	—	—
2019–20	Rapid City Rush	ECHL	24	12	17	29	36	—	—	—	—	—
2019–20	Toronto Marlies	AHL	4	1	0	1	2	—	—	—	—	—
2019–20	Ontario Reign	AHL	12	3	0	3	2	—	—	—	—	—
2020–21	Eisbären Berlin	DEL	33	8	12	20	10	9	1	3	4	2
2021–22	Eisbären Berlin	DEL	45	17	13	30	16	12	2	2	4	18
2022–23	Eisbären Berlin	DEL	55	21	15	36	21	—	—	—	—	—
2023–24	Admiral Vladivostok	KHL	63	15	11	26	22	—	—	—	—	—
2024–25	Admiral Vladivostok	KHL	32	2	15	17	2	—	—	—	—	—
2024–25	Avangard Omsk	KHL	30	11	7	18	14	13	0	1	1	0
2025–26	Avangard Omsk	KHL	62	11	15	26	30	17	3	4	7	15
NHL totals			1	0	0	0	0	—	—	—	—	—
KHL totals			187	39	48	87	68	30	3	5	8	15

== Awards and honours ==
Award	Year
QMJHL
First All-Star Team	2017
Most Goals (52)	2017
DEL
Champion (Eisbären Berlin)	2021, 2022
