= 2017–18 QMJHL season =

- League: Quebec Major Junior Hockey League
- Sport: Hockey
- Duration: Regular season September 21, 2017 – March 18, 2018; Playoffs; March 2018 – May 2018
- Teams: 18
- TV partner(s): Eastlink TV; TVA Sports; MATV

Draft
- Top draft pick: Alexis Lafrenière
- Picked by: Rimouski Océanic

Regular season
- Jean Rougeau Trophy: Blainville-Boisbriand Armada (1)
- Season MVP: Alex Barré-Boulet (Blainville-Boisbriand Armada)
- Top scorer: Alex Barré-Boulet (Blainville-Boisbriand Armada)

Playoffs
- Playoffs MVP: Jeffrey Viel (Titan)
- Finals champions: Acadie-Bathurst Titan
- Runners-up: Blainville-Boisbriand Armada

QMJHL seasons
- 2016–17 2018–19

2017–18 CHL seasons
- League: Canadian Hockey League
- Sport: Hockey
- Duration: OHL; September 2017 – March 2018; QMJHL; September 2017 – March 2018; WHL; September 2017 – March 2018
- Teams: 60
- TV partner(s): TVA Sports; Rogers Sportsnet; Rogers TV; Shaw TV
- Season MVP: Alex Barré-Boulet (Blainville-Boisbriand Armada) (QMJHL)
- Top scorer: Jayden Halbgewachs (Swift Current Broncos) (WHL)

Memorial Cup
- Finals champions: Acadie-Bathurst Titan (QMJHL) (1st title)
- Runners-up: Regina Pats (WHL)

The 2017–18 QMJHL season was the 49th season of the Quebec Major Junior Hockey League (QMJHL). The regular season began on September 21, 2017, and ended on March 18, 2018.

The playoffs started March 22, 2018, and ended on May 13. The winning team, the Acadie–Bathurst Titan, were awarded the President's Cup and won the Memorial Cup as the QMJHL champion in the 2018 Memorial Cup, which was hosted by the Regina Pats of the WHL at the Brandt Centre in Regina, Saskatchewan from May 18–27, 2018.

== Regular season standings ==
Note: GP = Games played; W = Wins; L = Losses; OTL = Overtime losses; SL = Shootout losses; GF = Goals for; GA = Goals against; PTS = Points; x = clinched playoff berth; y = clinched division title; z = clinched Jean Rougeau Trophy

Maritimes Division	GP	W	L	OTL	SL	PTS	GF	GA	Rank
xy-Acadie–Bathurst Titan	68	43	15	8	2	96	270	183	2
x-Halifax Mooseheads	68	43	18	6	1	93	270	223	4
x-Charlottetown Islanders	68	37	24	7	0	81	209	219	9
x-Cape Breton Screaming Eagles	68	32	28	6	2	72	235	259	12
x-Moncton Wildcats	68	27	33	5	3	62	233	282	14
Saint John Sea Dogs	68	14	43	9	2	39	181	301	18

East Division	GP	W	L	OTL	SL	PTS	GF	GA	Rank
xy-Rimouski Océanic	68	42	17	6	3	93	231	174	3
x-Victoriaville Tigres	68	42	20	4	2	90	270	195	6
x-Quebec Remparts	68	40	22	3	3	86	227	202	8
x-Baie-Comeau Drakkar	68	30	33	4	1	65	224	257	13
x-Chicoutimi Saguenéens	68	28	35	4	1	61	200	233	15
Shawinigan Cataractes	68	16	45	6	1	39	183	298	17

West Division	GP	W	L	OTL	SL	PTS	GF	GA	Rank
xyz-Blainville-Boisbriand Armada	68	50	11	4	3	107	276	184	1
x-Drummondville Voltigeurs	68	44	20	3	1	92	277	194	5
x-Rouyn-Noranda Huskies	68	39	19	7	3	88	239	179	7
x-Sherbrooke Phoenix	68	34	23	7	4	79	228	234	10
x-Gatineau Olympiques	68	32	27	5	4	73	213	215	11
x-Val-d'Or Foreurs	68	19	42	5	2	45	172	308	16

== Scoring leaders ==
Note: GP = Games played; G = Goals; A = Assists; Pts = Points; PIM = Penalty minutes

Player	Team	GP	G	A	Pts	PIM
Alex Barré-Boulet	Blainville-Boisbriand Armada	65	53	63	116	67
Vitalii Abramov	Gatineau/Victoriaville	56	45	59	104	67
Alexandre Alain	Blainville-Boisbriand Armada	65	44	43	87	52
Kevin Klíma	Chicoutimi Saguenéens	68	39	47	86	54
Max Comtois	Victoriaville Tigres	54	44	41	85	79
Otto Somppi	Halifax Mooseheads	59	28	55	83	28
Filip Zadina	Halifax Mooseheads	57	44	38	82	36
Ivan Kosorenkov	Victoriaville Tigres	63	36	46	82	46
Alexis Lafrenière	Rimouski Océanic	60	42	38	80	54
Joe Veleno	Saint John/Drummondville	64	22	57	79	48

== Leading goaltenders ==
Note: GP = Games played; Mins = Minutes played; W = Wins; L = Losses: OTL = Overtime losses; SL = Shootout losses; GA = Goals Allowed; SO = Shutouts; GAA = Goals against average

Player	Team	GP	Mins	W	L	OTL	SOL	GA	SO	Sv%	GAA
Samuel Harvey	Rouyn-Noranda Huskies	46	2715	30	9	4	2	95	4	.930	2.10
Colten Ellis	Rimouski Océanic	51	2836	33	8	5	1	111	6	.913	2.35
Olivier Rodrigue	Drummondville Voltigeurs	53	3001	31	16	2	1	127	3	.903	2.54
Étienne Montpetit	Val-d'Or/Victoriaville	44	2612	25	16	1	1	112	3	.925	2.57
Antoine Samuel	Baie-Comeau/Quebec	51	2921	27	18	0	2	130	3	.918	2.67

== 2018 President's Cup playoffs ==
Round 1
1	Blainville-Boisbriand	4
16	Val-d'Or	0
3	Rimouski	3
14	Moncton	4
4	Halifax	4
13	Baie-Comeau	1
8	Quebec	3
9	Charlottetown	4
2	Acadie–Bathurst	4
15	Chicoutimi	2
7	Rouyn-Noranda	3
10	Sherbrooke	4
5	Drummondville	4
12	Cape Breton	1
6	Victoriaville	4
11	Gatineau	1

Quarter-finals
1	Blainville-Boisbriand	4
14	Moncton	1
4	Halifax	0
9	Charlottetown	4
2	Acadie–Bathurst	4
10	Sherbrooke	0
5	Drummondville	1
6	Victoriaville	4

Semi-finals
1	Blainville-Boisbriand	4
9	Charlottetown	3
2	Acadie–Bathurst	4
6	Victoriaville	0

President's Cup Championship
1	Blainville-Boisbriand	2
2	Acadie–Bathurst	4

== First round ==
=== (1) Blainville-Boisbriand Armada vs. (16) Val-d'Or Foreurs ===
March 22	Blainville-Boisbriand Armada	3 – 2	OT	Val-d'Or Foreurs	Centre d'Excellence Sports Rousseau	Recap
13:56 - sh - Alexandre Alain (1); 15:12 - sh - Alex Barré-Boulet (1)		First period		Yan Dion (1) - 18:28
No scoring		Second period		No scoring
No scoring		Third period		David Henley (1) - 13:36
4:20 - Alexandre Alain (2)		First overtime period		No scoring
Émile Samson (18 saves / 20 shots)		Goalie stats		Marquis Mathieu (43 saves / 46 shots)

March 23	Blainville-Boisbriand Armada	5 – 1	Val-d'Or Foreurs	Centre d'Excellence Sports Rousseau	Recap
0:10 - Alexandre Alain (3); 18:46 - pp - Alexandre Alain (4)		First period	No scoring
7:25 - Charles-Antoine Giguère (1); 13:57 - Alex Barré-Boulet (2)		Second period	Maxim Mizyurin (1) - 5:36
14:37 - Drake Batherson (1)		Third period	No scoring
Émile Samson (14 saves / 15 shots)		Goalie stats	Marquis Mathieu (33 saves / 38 shots)

March 27	Val-d'Or Foreurs	2 – 4	Blainville-Boisbriand Armada	Centre Air Creebec	Recap
16:52 - pp - Ivan Kozlov (1)		First period	No scoring
7:23 - Nathan Hudgin (1)		Second period	Thomas Ethier (1) - pp - 2:08; Rémy Anglehart (1) - pp - 13:37; Charles-Antoine Giguère (2) - 16:29
No scoring		Third period	Alexandre Alain (5) - 2:37
Marquis Mathieu (14 saves / 18 shots)		Goalie stats	Émile Samson (27 saves / 29 shots)

March 28	Val-d'Or Foreurs	1 – 4	Blainville-Boisbriand Armada	Centre Air Creebec	Recap
No scoring		First period	No scoring
19:00 - pp - David Henley (2)		Second period	Thomas Ethier (2) - 15:15
No scoring		Third period	Drake Batherson (2) - 11:23; Joël Teasdale (1) - en - 18:33; Alexander Katerinakis (1) - en - 19:07
Marquis Mathieu (27 saves / 29 shots)		Goalie stats	Émile Samson (21 saves / 22 shots)

Blainville-Boisbriand wins series 4–0

=== (2) Acadie–Bathurst Titan vs. (15) Chicoutimi Saguenéens ===
March 23	Acadie–Bathurst Titan	3 – 1	Chicoutimi Saguenéens	K. C. Irving Regional Centre	Recap
7:24 - pp - Noah Dobson (1); 9:10 - Ethan Crossman (1); 14:14 - pp - Jeffrey Viel (1)		First period	Kelly Klima (1) - 4:08
No scoring		Second period	No scoring
No scoring		Third period	No scoring
Evan Fitzpatrick (20 saves / 21 shots)		Goalie stats	Zach Bouthillier (34 saves / 37 shots)

March 24	Acadie–Bathurst Titan	0 – 4	Chicoutimi Saguenéens	K. C. Irving Regional Centre	Recap
No scoring		First period	Ryan Smith (1) - 2:28
No scoring		Second period	Zachary Lavigne (1) - 2:36
No scoring		Third period	Simon Monette (1) - 12:36; Vincent Lapalme (1) - en - 17:56
Evan Fitzpatrick (23 saves / 26 shots)		Goalie stats	Zach Bouthillier (43 saves / 43 shots)

March 27	Chicoutimi Saguenéens	2 – 3	Acadie–Bathurst Titan	Centre Georges-Vézina	Recap
8:52 - pp - Kevin Klíma (1)		First period	Samuel Asselin (1) - 5:34
No scoring		Second period	Olivier Galipeau (1) - 16:04
17:05 - Samuel Houde (1)		Third period	Jordan Maher (1) - 3:32
Zach Bouthillier (32 saves / 35 shots)		Goalie stats	Evan Fitzpatrick (21 saves / 23 shots)

March 28	Chicoutimi Saguenéens	6 – 3	Acadie–Bathurst Titan	Centre Georges-Vézina	Recap
6:34 - pp - Morgan Nauss (1); 16:40 - pp - Kevin Klíma (2)		First period	No scoring
18:59 - Kelly Klíma (2)		Second period	Olivier Galipeau (2) - 12:07; Ethan Crossman (2) - 12:50; Antoine Morand (1) - 18:47
12:16 - Kelly Klíma (3); 14:38 - Zachary Lavigne (2); 15:18 - Kevin Klíma (3)		Third period	No scoring
Zach Bouthillier (29 saves / 32 shots)		Goalie stats	Evan Fitzpatrick (20 saves / 26 shots)

March 30	Acadie–Bathurst Titan	4 – 1	Chicoutimi Saguenéens	K. C. Irving Regional Centre	Recap
9:26 - Jeffrey Viel (2)		First period	No scoring
8:35 - pp - Adam Holwell (1)		Second period	No scoring
5:08 - Jordan Maher (2); 18:28 - en - Jeffrey Viel (3)		Third period	Kevin Klíma (4) - 1:50
Evan Fitzpatrick (23 saves / 24 shots)		Goalie stats	Zach Bouthillier (47 saves / 50 shots)

April 1	Chicoutimi Saguenéens	1 – 5	Acadie–Bathurst Titan	Centre Georges-Vézina	Recap
12:57 - Vincent Lapalme (2)		First period	No scoring
No scoring		Second period	Ethan Crossman (3) - 1:19; Jeffrey Viel (3) - 12:13
No scoring		Third period	Adam Holwell (2) - 12:53; Liam Murphy (1) - 13:43; Samuel Asselin (2) - 15:36
Zach Bouthillier (32 saves / 36 shots); Alexis Shank (1 save / 1 shot)		Goalie stats	Evan Fitzpatrick (24 saves / 25 shots)

Acadie–Bathurst wins series 4–2

=== (3) Rimouski Océanic vs. (14) Moncton Wildcats ===
March 23	Rimouski Océanic	1 – 4	Moncton Wildcats	Colisée Financière Sun Life	Recap
No scoring		First period	James Phelan (1) - pp - 16:12; Jakob Pelletier (1) - pp - 17:42
No scoring		Second period	No scoring
7:21 - Denis Mikhnin (1)		Third period	Jakob Pelletier (2) - 7:48; Brady Pataki (1) - 10:32
Colten Ellis (26 saves / 30 shots)		Goalie stats	Mark Grametbauer (30 saves / 31 shots)

March 24	Rimouski Océanic	2 – 1	OT	Moncton Wildcats	Colisée Financière Sun Life	Recap
No scoring		First period		No scoring
12:09 - Charle-Edouard D'Astous (1)		Second period		Alexander Khovanov (1) - 12:23
No scoring		Third period		No scoring
17:06 - Alexis Lafrenière (1)		First overtime period		No scoring
Colten Ellis (33 saves / 34 shots)		Goalie stats		Mark Grametbauer (31 saves / 33 shots)

March 27	Moncton Wildcats	2 – 6	Rimouski Océanic	Moncton Coliseum	Recap
No scoring		First period	Samuel Dove-McFalls (1) - 5:57; Anthony Gagnon (1) - pp - 17:44; Anthony Gagnon (2) - 18:19
No scoring		Second period	Alexis Lafrenière (2) - 11:24
9:16 - Simon Le Coultre (1); 12:38 - pp - Anderson MacDonald (1)		Third period	Mathieu Nadeau (1) - 3:32; Alexis Lafrenière (3) - en - 19:00
Mark Grametbauer (25 saves / 30 shots)		Goalie stats	Colten Ellis (26 saves / 28 shots)

March 28	Moncton Wildcats	6 – 2	Rimouski Océanic	Moncton Coliseum	Recap
5:44 - James Phelan (2); 16:03 - pp - Adam Capannelli (1)		First period	Anthony Gagnon (3) - 7:24
5:31 - James Phelan (3); 15:40 - sh - Brady Pataki (2); 18:19 - pp - Jacob Hudson (1)		Second period	No scoring
12:03 - pp - Jonathan Aspirot (1)		Third period	Dmitry Zavgorodniy (1) - pp - 19:42
Mark Grametbauer (20 saves / 22 shots)		Goalie stats	Colten Ellis (15 saves / 20 shots); Jimmy Lemay (9 saves / 10 shots)

March 30	Rimouski Océanic	5 – 2	Moncton Wildcats	Colisée Financière Sun Life	Recap
No scoring		First period	No scoring
11:13 - pp - Alexis Lafrenière (4); 16:53 - Carson MacKinnon (1)		Second period	No scoring
13:14 - Mathieu Nadeau (2); 16:49 - pp - Samuel Dove-McFalls (2); 18:35 - Denis Mikhnin (2)		Third period	Nicholas Welsh (1) - pp - 12:07; Brady Pataki (3) - 19:52
Colten Ellis (28 saves / 33 shots)		Goalie stats	Mark Grametbauer (22 saves / 24 shots)

April 1	Moncton Wildcats	2 – 1	Rimouski Océanic	Moncton Coliseum	Recap
No scoring		First period	No scoring
12:59 - Jonathan Aspirot (2)		Second period	Denis Mikhnin (3) - 3:26
10:41 - Dylan Seitz (1)		Third period	No scoring
Mark Grametbauer (40 saves / 41 shots)		Goalie stats	Colten Ellis (20 saves / 22 shots)

April 3	Rimouski Océanic	3 – 6	Moncton Wildcats	Colisée Financière Sun Life	Recap
2:22 - Samuel Dove-McFalls (3)		First period	Brady Pataki (4) - pp - 17:19; Daniil Miromanov (1) - 18:12; Jonathan Aspirot (3) - 19:49
8:51 - Denis Mikhnin (4); 10:37 - Denis Mikhnin (5)		Second period	Nicholas Welsh (2) - 7:26
No scoring		Third period	Dylan Seitz (2) - 19:06; James Phelan (4) - en - 19:37
Colten Ellis (19 saves / 24 shots); Jimmy Lemay (3 saves / 3 shots)		Goalie stats	Mark Grametbauer (17 saves / 20 shots)

Moncton wins series 4–3

=== (4) Halifax Mooseheads vs. (13) Baie-Comeau Drakkar ===
March 23	Halifax Mooseheads	5 – 2	Baie-Comeau Drakkar	Scotiabank Centre	Recap
15:41 - Arnaud Durandeau (1)		First period	Xavier Bouchard (1) - 7:58
1:23 - Raphaël Lavoie (1); 13:25 - Maxime Fortier (1)		Second period	No scoring
8:35 - pp - Maxime Fortier (2); 10:02 - Xavier Parent (1)		Third period	Ivan Chekhovich (1) - pp - 7:04
Alexis Gravel (36 saves / 38 shots)		Goalie stats	Francis Leclerc (21 saves / 26 shots)

March 24	Halifax Mooseheads	5 – 3	Baie-Comeau Drakkar	Scotiabank Centre	Recap
6:09 - Filip Zadina (1); 9:54 - Maxime Fortier (3)		First period	Gabriel Fortier (1) - 12:43
13:52 - Joel Bishop (1)		Second period	Antoine Girard (1) - en - 5:11
15:19 - Benoit-Olivier Groulx (1); 16:58 - Xavier Parent (2)		Third period	Ivan Chekhovich (2) - 7:30
Alexis Gravel (26 saves / 28 shots)		Goalie stats	Francis Leclerc (34 saves / 39 shots)

March 27	Baie-Comeau Drakkar	4 – 2	Halifax Mooseheads	Centre Henry-Leonard	Recap
No scoring		First period	Arnaud Durandeau (2) - 13:26; Filip Zadina (2) - 16:32
0:58 - Gabriel Fortier (2); 7:15 - Ivan Chekhovich (3); 12:05 - Jean-Simon Bélanger (1)		Second period	No scoring
18:01 - Gabriel Fortier (3)		Third period	No scoring
Francis Leclerc (25 saves / 27 shots)		Goalie stats	Alexis Gravel (21 saves / 25 shots)

March 28	Baie-Comeau Drakkar	1 – 8	Halifax Mooseheads	Centre Henry-Leonard	Recap
16:48 - Jordan Martel (1)		First period	Maxime Fortier (4) - 10:19; Raphaël Lavoie (2) - pp - 18:58
No scoring		Second period	Joel Bishop (2) - 8:40; Maxime Fortier (5) - sh - 14:34; Jocktan Chainey (1) - 19:30
No scoring		Third period	Ben Higgins (1) - sh - 1:58; Arnaud Durandeau (3) - 4:43; Connor Moynihan (1) - pp - 13:15
Francis Leclerc (19 saves / 24 shots); Justin Blanchette (13 saves / 16 shots)		Goalie stats	Alexis Gravel (27 saves / 28 shots)

March 30	Baie-Comeau Drakkar	0 – 4	Halifax Mooseheads	Centre Henry-Leonard	Recap
No scoring		First period	6:26 - Jocktan Chainey (2)
No scoring		Second period	9:38 - Connor Moynihan (2); 15:09 - Arnaud Durandeau (4)
No scoring		Third period	10:28 - Arnaud Durandeau (5)
Francis Leclerc (28 saves / 32 shots)		Goalie stats	Alexis Gravel (41 saves / 41 shots)

Halifax wins series 4–1

=== (5) Drummondville Voltigeurs vs. (12) Cape Breton Screaming Eagles ===
March 23	Drummondville Voltigeurs	5 – 2	Cape Breton Screaming Eagles	Centre Marcel Dionne	Recap
3:52 - Pavel Koltygin (1); 5:12 - Nicolas Guay (1); 14:16 - Dawson Mercer (1)		First period	Peyton Hoyt (1) - sh - 16:51
18:35 - Daven Castonguay (1)		Second period	Adam McCormick (1) - 2:27
16:59 - pp - Morgan Adams-Moisan (1)		Third period	No scoring
Olivier Rodrigue (15 saves / 17 shots)		Goalie stats	Kevin Mandolese (27 saves / 32 shots)

March 24	Drummondville Voltigeurs	4 – 5	3OT	Cape Breton Screaming Eagles	Centre Marcel Dionne	Recap
0:34 - Joe Veleno (1)		First period		Egor Sokolov (1) - 13:29
10:38 - Joe Veleno (2)		Second period		Shaun Miller (1) - 9:42
11:47 - Yvan Mongo (1); 13:23 - Xavier Simoneau (1)		Third period		Declan Smith (1) - 4:15; Jordan Ty Fournier (1) - sh - 14:14
No scoring		Third overtime period		Olivier Bourret (1) - 14:26
Olivier Rodrigue (48 saves / 53 shots)		Goalie stats		Kevin Mandolese (52 saves / 56 shots)

March 26	Cape Breton Screaming Eagles	3 – 6	Drummondville Voltigeurs	Centre 200	Recap
6:14 - pp - Adam McCormick (2)		First period	Nicolas Guay (2) - pp - 9:27
2:13 - Shaun Miller (2)		Second period	Nicolas Beaudin (1) - 6:10; Cédric Desruisseaux (1) - pp - 12:04; Joe Veleno (3) - 15:23; Connor Bramwell (1) - 15:53
16:50 - Jordan Ty Fournier (2)		Third period	Pavel Koltygin (2) - 3:43
Kevin Mandolese (24 saves / 29 shots); Kyle Jessiman (4 saves / 5 shots)		Goalie stats	Olivier Rodrigue (21 saves / 24 shots)

March 28	Cape Breton Screaming Eagles	1 – 4	Drummondville Voltigeurs	Centre 200	Recap
No scoring		First period	Cédric Desruisseaux (2) - 8:32
No scoring		Second period	Jarrett Baker (1) - 3:02
11:29 - Declan Smith (2)		Third period	Nicolas Beaudin (2) - pp - 7:07; Pavel Koltygin (3) - en - 17:44
Kevin Mandolese (21 saves / 24 shots)		Goalie stats	Olivier Rodrigue (23 saves / 24 shots)

March 29	Cape Breton Screaming Eagles	1 – 5	Drummondville Voltigeurs	Centre 200	Recap
No scoring		First period	11:37 - Nicolas Guay (3)
No scoring		Second period	8:49 - Joe Veleno (4); 13:53 - Yvan Mongo (2)
Leon Gawanke (1) - 4:30		Third period	7:42 - Connor Bramwell (2); 14:20 - Xavier Simoneau (2)
Kevin Mandolese (16 saves / 19 shots); Kyle Jessiman (8 saves / 9 shots)		Goalie stats	Olivier Rodrigue (16 saves / 17 shots)

Drummondville wins series 4–1

=== (6) Victoriaville Tigres vs. (11) Gatineau Olympiques ===
March 23	Victoriaville Tigres	7 – 2	Gatineau Olympiques	Colisée Desjardins	Recap
15:40 - pp - Max Comtois (1); 18:58 - Vitalii Abramov (1)		First period	No scoring
5:38 - Justin Paré (1); 13:10 - Ivan Kosorenkov (1)		Second period	Gabriel Bilodeau (1) - 7:22
4:10 - Max Comtois (2); 7:23 - pp - Vitalii Abramov (2); 8:39 - pp - Dominic Cormier (1)		Third period	Anthony Beauchamp (1) - pp - 15:41
Étienne Montpetit (15 saves / 17 shots)		Goalie stats	Tristan Bérubé (29 saves / 36 shots); Creed Jones (9 saves / 9 shots)

March 24	Victoriaville Tigres	3 – 2	Gatineau Olympiques	Colisée Desjardins	Recap
6:39 - Vitalii Abramov (3); 16:37 - pp - Max Comtois (3)		First period	No scoring
No scoring		Second period	Dawson Theede (1) - pp - 7:07
9:53 - Justin Paré (2)		Third period	Alexandre Landreville (1) - 19:08
Étienne Montpetit (32 saves / 34 shots)		Goalie stats	Tristan Bérubé (29 saves / 32 shots)

March 27	Gatineau Olympiques	2 – 4	Victoriaville Tigres	Robert Guertin Centre	Recap
11:46 - Dawson Theede (2)		First period	Vitalii Abramov (4) - pp - 8:46
8:16 - Anthony Beauchamp (2)		Second period	Dominic Cormier (2) - pp - 6:14; Félix Boivin (1) - 16:54
No scoring		Third period	Simon Lafrance (1) - 12:19
Tristan Bérubé (19 saves / 23 shots)		Goalie stats	Étienne Montpetit (27 saves / 29 shots)

March 28	Gatineau Olympiques	2 – 1	Victoriaville Tigres	Robert Guertin Centre	Recap
No scoring		First period	Mathieu Sévigny (1) - sh - 15:12
No scoring		Second period	No scoring
7:06 - Dawson Theede (3); 12:14 - Anthony Beauchamp		Third period	No scoring
Tristan Bérubé (32 saves / 33 shots)		Goalie stats	Étienne Montpetit (27 saves / 29 shots)

March 30	Victoriaville Tigres	4 – 2	Gatineau Olympiques	Colisée Desjardins	Recap
18:08 - pp - Vitalii Abramov (5)		First period	Dawson Theede (4) - pp - 10:37; Dawson Theede (5) - sh - 12:33
18:38 - Ivan Kosorenkov (2)		Second period	No scoring
7:24 - Vitalii Abramov (6); 15:45 - pp - Jérémie Beaudin (1)		Third period	No scoring
Étienne Montpetit (24 saves / 26 shots)		Goalie stats	Tristan Bérubé (26 saves / 30 shots)

Victoriaville wins series 4–1

=== (7) Rouyn-Noranda Huskies vs. (10) Sherbrooke Phoenix ===
March 23	Rouyn-Noranda Huskies	1 – 2	Sherbrooke Phoenix	Aréna Iamgold	Recap
7:59 - Tommy Beaudoin (1)		First period	No scoring
No scoring		Second period	Nicolas Poulin (1) - 3:49; Sam Poulin (1) - pp - 5:05
No scoring		Third period	No scoring
Samuel Harvey (42 saves / 44 shots)		Goalie stats	Reilly Pickard (25 saves / 26 shots)

March 24	Rouyn-Noranda Huskies	6 – 2	Sherbrooke Phoenix	Aréna Iamgold	Recap
3:12 - pp - William Cyr (1); 8:05 - pp - Rafaël Harvey-Pinard (1); 11:30 - Samuel Naud (1)		First period	Marek Zachar (1) - 4:47
2:16 - Alex Beaucage (1)		Second period	Mathieu Olivier (1) - 7:34
3:23 - Patrik Hrehorčák (1); 14:44 - pp - Félix Bibeau (1)		Third period	No scoring
Samuel Harvey (36 saves / 38 shots)		Goalie stats	Reilly Pickard (30 saves / 36 shots)

March 27	Sherbrooke Phoenix	0 – 3	Rouyn-Noranda Huskies	Palais des Sports Léopold-Drolet	Recap
No scoring		First period	No scoring
No scoring		Second period	Peter Abbandonato (1) - 5:11
No scoring		Third period	Peter Abbandonato (2) - 11:48; Rafaël Harvey-Pinard (2) - en - 19:05
Reilly Pickard (33 saves / 35 shots)		Goalie stats	Samuel Harvey (36 saves / 36 shots)

March 28	Sherbrooke Phoenix	4 – 2	Rouyn-Noranda Huskies	Palais des Sports Léopold-Drolet	Recap
10:56 - pp - Hugo Roy (1)		First period	Peter Abbandonato (3) - pp - 14:31
13:32 - Yaroslav Alexeyev (1)		Second period	Mathieu Boucher (1) - pp - 14:46
17:05 - Sam Poulin (2); 19:22 - en - Nicolas Poulin (2)		Third period	No scoring
Reilly Pickard (36 saves / 38 shots)		Goalie stats	Samuel Harvey (39 saves / 42 shots)

March 30	Rouyn-Noranda Huskies	4 – 1	Sherbrooke Phoenix	Aréna Iamgold	Recap
No scoring		First period	Yaroslav Alexeyev (2) - pp - 19:10
2:18 - Taylor Ford (1)		Second period	No scoring
7:47 - Peter Abbandonato (4); 10:27 - pp - Mathieu Boucher (2); 18:16 - en - Patrik Hrehorčák (2)		Third period	No scoring
Samuel Harvey (34 saves / 35 shots)		Goalie stats	Reilly Pickard (22 saves / 25 shots)

April 1	Sherbrooke Phoenix	4 – 3	OT	Rouyn-Noranda Huskies	Palais des Sports Léopold-Drolet	Recap
6:16 - pp - Mathieu Olivier (2); 10:10 - pp - Nicolas Poulin (3)		First period		Rafaël Harvey-Pinard (3) - pp - 17:50
8:31 - Yaroslav Alexeyev (3)		Second period		Rafaël Harvey-Pinard (4) - pp - 13:19
No scoring		Third period		Rafaël Harvey-Pinard (5) - 19:41
2:33 - Marek Zachar (2)		First overtime period		No scoring
Reilly Pickard (26 saves / 29 shots)		Goalie stats		Samuel Harvey (30 saves / 34 shots)

April 3	Rouyn-Noranda Huskies	1 – 3	Sherbrooke Phoenix	Aréna Iamgold	Recap
3:19 - ps - Tommy Beaudoin (2)		First period	No scoring
No scoring		Second period	Evan MacKinnon (1) - 9:57; Félix Robert (1) - 15:27
No scoring		Third period	Nicolas Poulin (4) - 9:26
Samuel Harvey (41 saves / 44 shots)		Goalie stats	Reilly Pickard (30 saves / 31 shots)

Sherbrooke wins series 4–3

=== (8) Quebec Remparts vs. (9) Charlottetown Islanders ===
March 24	Quebec Remparts	2 – 6	Charlottetown Islanders	Videotron Centre	Recap
16:58 - Gregor MacLeod (1)		First period	Sullivan Sparkes (1) - 5:50
11:35 - pp - Sam Dunn (1)		Second period	Keith Getson (1) - pp - 13:57
No scoring		Third period	Keith Getson (2) - 5:24; Derek Gentile (1) - 8:09; Sam King (1) -14:24; Keith Getson (3) - en - 18:40
Antoine Samuel (14 saves / 19 shots)		Goalie stats	Matthew Welsh (24 saves / 26 shots)

March 25	Quebec Remparts	3 – 0	Charlottetown Islanders	Videotron Centre	Recap
8:16 - Jesse Sutton (1); 10:14 - Olivier Garneau (1)		First period	No scoring
5:18 - Pascal Laberge (1)		Second period	No scoring
No scoring		Third period	No scoring
Antoine Samuel (25 saves / 25 shots)		Goalie stats	Matthew Welsh (27 saves / 30 shots)

March 28	Charlottetown Islanders	2 – 4	Quebec Remparts	Eastlink Centre	Recap
5:20 - Keith Getson (4)		First period	Andrew Picco (1) - 11:36
No scoring		Second period	Matthew Grouchy (1) - 17:18
12:54 - pp - Saku Vesterinen (1)		Third period	Jesse Sutton (2) - 4:00; Matthew Boucher (1) - en - 19:39
Matthew Welsh (15 saves / 18 shots)		Goalie stats	Antoine Samuel (35 saves / 37 shots)

March 30	Charlottetown Islanders	4 – 2	Quebec Remparts	Eastlink Centre	Recap
12:39 - pp - Brett Budgell (1)		First period	Andrew Coxhead (1) - 15:44
14:41 - Pascal Aquin (1)		Second period	Matthew Boucher (2) - 19:25
14:30 - Brett Budgell (2); 19:13 - en - Pascal Aquin (2)		Third period	No scoring
Matthew Welsh (24 saves / 26 shots)		Goalie stats	Antoine Samuel (28 saves / 31 shots)

March 31	Charlottetown Islanders	3 – 1	Quebec Remparts	Eastlink Centre	Recap
No scoring		First period	No scoring
Nikita Alexandrov (1) - pp - 12:53		Second period	No scoring
Brendon Clavelle (1) - 14:23; Keith Getson (5) - en - 19:02		Third period	1:19 - Jesse Sutton (3)
Matthew Welsh (41 saves / 42 shots)		Goalie stats	Antoine Samuel (30 saves / 32 shots)

April 2	Quebec Remparts	5 – 2	Charlottetown Islanders	Videotron Centre	Recap
Benjamin Gagné (1) - 18:13		First period	No scoring
Christian Huntley (1) - pp - 0:35		Second period	11:59 - pp - Derek Gentile (2)
Pascal Laberge (2) - 1:08; Olivier Garneau (2) - en - 18:48; Matthew Boucher (3) - en - 19:45		Third period	4:47 - sh - Sam King (2)
Antoine Samuel (34 saves / 36 shots)		Goalie stats	Matthew Welsh (20 saves / 23 shots)

April 3	Quebec Remparts	3 – 8	Charlottetown Islanders	Videotron Centre	Recap
3:23 - Andrew Coxhead (2)		First period	Pascal Aquin (3) - 2:26
10:02 - pp - Philipp Kurashev (1)		Second period	Daniel Hardie (1) - 4:20
5:58 - pp - Olivier Garneau (3)		Third period	Pascal Aquin (4) - 0:28; Cameron Askew (1) - 3:27; Sullivan Sparkes (2) - 3:46; Pascal Aquin (5) - 4:20; Taylor Egan (1) - pp - 10:35; Pascal Aquin (6) - en - 15:50
Antoine Samuel (19 saves / 25 shots); Déreck Baribeau (1 save / 2 shots)		Goalie stats	Matthew Welsh (36 saves / 39 shots)

Charlottetown wins series 4–3

== Quarter-finals ==
=== (1) Blainville-Boisbriand Armada vs. (14) Moncton Wildcats ===
April 6	Blainville-Boisbriand Armada	6 – 1	Moncton Wildcats	Centre d'Excellence Sports Rousseau	Recap
13:36 - sh - Alexander Katerinakis (2); 19:35 - Alex Barré-Boulet (3)		First period	Adam Capannelli (2) - 12:00
7:05 - Thomas Ethier (3); 11:37 - Luke Henman (1); 16:57 - pp - Alex Barré-Boulet (4)		Second period	No scoring
5:49 - Drake Batherson (3)		Third period	No scoring
Émile Samson (22 saves / 23 shots)		Goalie stats	Mark Grametbauer (16 saves / 21 shots); Matthew Waite (8 saves / 9 shots)

April 8	Blainville-Boisbriand Armada	9 – 3	Moncton Wildcats	Centre d'Excellence Sports Rousseau	Recap
9:15 - Alex Barré-Boulet (5); 15:11 - Alex Barré-Boulet (6)		First period	No scoring
5:49 - Alexandre Alain (6); 8:34 - sh - Joël Teasdale (2); 12:39 - pp - Alex Barré-Boulet (7)		Second period	James Phelan (5) - sh - 17:05
0:13 - Alexandre Alain (7); 14:38 - pp - Aleksi Anttalainen (1); 16:33 - pp - Ryan Da Silva (1); 18:39 - pp - Charles-Antoine Giguère (3)		Third period	James Phelan (6) - pp - 1:36; Nicholas Welsh (3) - pp - 2:30
Émile Samson (25 saves / 28 shots)		Goalie stats	Mark Grametbauer (32 saves / 41 shots)

April 10	Moncton Wildcats	1 – 7	Blainville-Boisbriand Armada	Moncton Coliseum	Recap
No scoring		First period	Alexandre Alain (8) - 3:47
No scoring		Second period	Alexander Katerinakis (3) - 1:36; Drake Batherson (4) - pp - 9:53; Joël Teasdale (3) - 15:25; Anthony Poulin (1) - sh - 19:34
19:56 - Justin Lazure (1)		Third period	Alex Barré-Boulet (8) - 11:43; Mathieu Boissonneault (1) - 16:13
Mark Grametbauer (30 saves / 37 shots)		Goalie stats	Mikhail Denisov (13 saves / 14 shots)

April 11	Moncton Wildcats	5 – 4	Blainville-Boisbriand Armada	Moncton Coliseum	Recap
2:32 - sh - Jeremy McKenna (1); 9:48 - pp - Alexander Khovanov (2)		First period	Luke Henman (2) - pp - 12:08; Luke Henman (3) - pp - 19:22; Joël Teasdale (4) - pp - 19:28
9:20 - Brady Pataki (5); 15:31 - James Phelan (7); 17:18 - pp - James Phelan (8)		Second period	Alexandre Alain (9) - 12:12
No scoring		Third period	No scoring
Mark Grametbauer (38 saves / 42 shots)		Goalie stats	Émile Samson (3 saves / 5 shots); Mikhail Denisov (25 saves / 28 shots)

April 13	Moncton Wildcats	3 – 8	Blainville-Boisbriand Armada	Moncton Coliseum	Recap
No scoring		First period	16:00 - Alexander Katerinakis (4); 16:26 - Drake Batherson (5)
Alexander Khovanov (3) - 0:27; James Phelan (9) - 5:41		Second period	5:14 - Samuel Bolduc (1); 7:56 - Joël Teasdale (5); 11:22 - Drake Batherson (6)
Simon Le Coultre (2) - 9:42		Third period	5:31 - Mathieu Boissonneault (2); 9:15 - en - Alexander Katerinakis (5); 16:33 - en - Thomas Ethier (4)
Mark Grametbauer (13 saves / 18 shots); Matthew Waite (15 saves / 16 shots)		Goalie stats	Émile Samson (31 saves / 34 shots)

Blainville-Boisbriand wins series 4 – 1

=== (2) Acadie–Bathurst Titan vs. (10) Sherbrooke Phoenix ===
April 6	Acadie–Bathurst Titan	5 – 1	Sherbrooke Phoenix	K. C. Irving Regional Centre	Recap
16:34 - Ethan Crossman (4)		First period	Sam Poulin (3) - 5:23
3:56 - German Rubtsov (1); 7:22 - Mitchell Balmas (1); 16:51 - Olivier Galipeau (3); 18:28 - pp - Mitchell Balmas (2)		Second period	No scoring
No scoring		Third period	No scoring
Evan Fitzpatrick (22 saves / 23 shots)		Goalie stats	Reilly Pickard (23 saves / 28 shots); Brendan Cregan (5 saves / 5 shots)

April 7	Acadie–Bathurst Titan	5 – 1	Sherbrooke Phoenix	K. C. Irving Regional Centre	Recap
2:59 - Adam Holwell (3); 7:15 - Ethan Crossman (5)		First period	No scoring
13:07 - Mitchell Balmas (3)		Second period	Yaroslav Alexeyev (4) - 16:50
7:47 - Mitchell Balmas (4)		Third period	No scoring
Evan Fitzpatrick (35 saves / 36 shots)		Goalie stats	Reilly Pickard (16 saves / 20 shots); Brendan Cregan (10 saves / 11 shots)

April 10	Sherbrooke Phoenix	0 – 5	Acadie–Bathurst Titan	Palais des Sports Léopold-Drolet	Recap
No scoring		First period	Jeffrey Viel (5) - 12:40
		Second period	Mitchell Balmas (5) - 4:10; Marc-André LeCouffe (1) - 8:45; German Rubtsov (2) - sh - 18:50
No scoring		Third period	German Rubtsov (3) - 2:54
Reilly Pickard (24 saves / 28 shots); Brendan Cregan (10 saves / 11 shots)		Goalie stats	Evan Fitzpatrick (23 saves / 23 shots)

April 11	Sherbrooke Phoenix	2 − 3	OT	Acadie–Bathurst Titan	Palais des Sports Léopold-Drolet	Recap
No scoring		First period		No scoring
No scoring		Second period		Ethan Crossman (6) - 2:05
11:35 - pp - Sam Poulin (4); 18:05 - Sam Poulin (5)		Third period		Jeffrey Viel (6) - 16:53
No scoring		First overtime period		Liam Murphy (3) - 5:12
Brendan Cregan (34 saves / 37 shots)		Goalie stats		Evan Fitzpatrick (28 saves / 30 shots)

Acadie–Bathurst wins series 4 – 0

=== (4) Halifax Mooseheads vs. (9) Charlottetown Islanders ===
April 6	Halifax Mooseheads	3 – 4	OT	Charlottetown Islanders	Scotiabank Centre	Recap
14:50 - pp - Connor Moynihan (3)		First period		Keith Getson (6) - pp - 17:40
No scoring		Second period		No scoring
3:04 - Xavier Parent (3); 6:19 - Filip Zadina (3)		Third period		Nikita Alexandrov (2) - 0:42; Keith Getson (7) - 11:42
No scoring		First overtime period		Pascal Aquin (7) - 8:58
Alexis Gravel (38 saves / 42 shots)		Goalie stats		Matthew Welsh (41 saves / 44 shots)

April 7	Halifax Mooseheads	4 – 7	Charlottetown Islanders	Scotiabank Centre	Recap
No scoring		First period	Derek Gentile (3) - 7:08; Nikita Alexandrov (3) - 11:58
8:06 - pp - Filip Zadina (4)		Second period	Keith Getson (8) - 10:01; Pascal Aquin (8) - 13:50; Nikita Alexandrov (4) - 15:31
11:02 - Raphaël Lavoie (3); 16:47 - Brett Crossley (1); 17:41 - Benoit-Olivier Groulx (2)		Third period	Hunter Drew (1) - pp - 4:25; Hunter Drew (2) - en - 18:30
Alexis Gravel (12 saves / 17 shots); Blade Mann-Dixon (11 saves / 12 shots)		Goalie stats	Matthew Welsh (47 saves / 51 shots)

April 10	Charlottetown Islanders	5 – 2	Halifax Mooseheads	Eastlink Centre	Recap
19:49 - pp - Nikita Alexandrov (5)		First period	Xavier Parent (4) - pp - 16:15; Connor Moynihan (4) - pp - 18:38
1:08 - Brett Budgell (3); 14:27 - Pierre-Olivier Joseph (1); 19:35 - Cameron Askew (2)		Second period	No scoring
17:57 - Daniel Hardie (2)		Third period	No scoring
Matthew Welsh (27 saves / 29 shots)		Goalie stats	Blade Mann-Dixon (30 saves / 35 shots)

April 11	Charlottetown Islanders	4 – 2	Halifax Mooseheads	Eastlink Centre	Recap
No scoring		First period	No scoring
Daniel Hardie (3) - pp - 17:56		Second period	3:25 - Filip Zadina (5); 6:22 - Joel Bishop (3)
Nikita Alexandrov (6) - 1:18; Keith Getson (9) - 14:34; Derek Gentile (4) - en - 18:45		Third period	No scoring
Matthew Welsh (26 saves / 28 shots)		Goalie stats	Alexis Gravel (31 saves / 34 shots)

Charlottetown wins series 4 – 0

=== (5) Drummondville Voltigeurs vs. (6) Victoriaville Tigres ===
April 6	Drummondville Voltigeurs	4 – 2	Victoriaville Tigres	Centre Marcel Dionne	Recap
10:46 - Nicolas Beaudin (3)		First period	Mathieu Sévigny (2) - 1:27; Chase Harwell (1) - 3:39
1:57 - Pavel Koltygin (4)		Second period	No scoring
0:53 - pp - Xavier Bernard (1); 19:39 - en - Connor Bramwell (3)		Third period	No scoring
Olivier Rodrigue (21 saves / 23 shots)		Goalie stats	Étienne Montpetit (19 saves / 22 shots)

April 7	Drummondville Voltigeurs	1 – 4	Victoriaville Tigres	Centre Marcel Dionne	Recap
No scoring		First period	Félix Lauzon (1) - sh - 19:38
10:11 - Morgan Adams-Moisan (2)		Second period	Vincent Lanoue (1) - 7:36; Chase Harwell (2) - pp - 12:20
No scoring		Third period	Mathieu Sévigny (3) - en - 18:32
Olivier Rodrigue (16 saves / 19 shots)		Goalie stats	Étienne Montpetit (26 saves / 27 shots)

April 9	Victoriaville Tigres	5 – 4	Drummondville Voltigeurs	Colisée Desjardins	Recap
10:50 - Simon Lafrance (2)		First period	No scoring
2:28 - Justin Paré (3); 8:23 - Ivan Kosorenkov (3); 14:38 - Chase Harwell (3); 19:58 - pp - Vincent Lanoue (2)		Second period	Connor Bramwell (4) - pp - 8:11; Joe Veleno (5) - pp - 13:27
No scoring		Third period	Morgan Adams-Moisan (3) - 18:36; Yvan Mongo (3) - 19:27
Étienne Montpetit (27 saves / 31 shots)		Goalie stats	Olivier Rodrigue (14 saves / 19 shots)

April 13	Victoriaville Tigres	3 – 1	Drummondville Voltigeurs	Colisée Desjardins	Recap
0:31 - Chase Harwell (4); 5:20 - Vitalii Abramov (7)		First period	Pavel Koltygin (5) - 4:41
No scoring		Second period	No scoring
8:13 - Jimmy Huntington (1)		Third period	No scoring
Étienne Montpetit (24 saves / 25 shots)		Goalie stats	Olivier Rodrigue (18 saves / 21 shots)

April 15	Drummondville Voltigeurs	0 – 3	Victoriaville Tigres	Centre Marcel Dionne	Recap
No scoring		First period	No scoring
No scoring		Second period	No scoring
No scoring		Third period	Dominic Cormier (3) - 8:37; Félix Lauzon (2) - 15:52; Jimmy Huntington (2) - 17:57
Olivier Rodrigue (29 saves / 31 shots)		Goalie stats	Étienne Montpetit (22 saves / 22 shots)

Victoriaville wins series 4 – 1

== Semi-finals ==
=== (1) Blainville-Boisbriand Armada vs. (9) Charlottetown Islanders ===
April 20	Blainville-Boisbriand Armada	3 – 1	Charlottetown Islanders	Centre d'Excellence Sports Rousseau	Recap
1:35 - Joël Teasdale (6)		First period	No scoring
No scoring		Second period	Derek Gentile (5) - 17:48
10:27 - Alexander Katerinakis (6); 18:45 - pp - Alexandre Alain (10)		Third period	No scoring
Émile Samson (19 saves / 20 shots)		Goalie stats	Matthew Welsh (22 saves / 25 shots)

April 21	Blainville-Boisbriand Armada	1 – 0	Charlottetown Islanders	Centre d'Excellence Sports Rousseau	Recap
No scoring		First period	No scoring
5:02 - pp - Alexandre Alain (11)		Second period	No scoring
No scoring		Third period	No scoring
Émile Samson (28 saves / 28 shots)		Goalie stats	Matthew Welsh (27 saves / 28 shots)

April 24	Charlottetown Islanders	3 – 2	OT	Blainville-Boisbriand Armada	Eastlink Centre	Recap
11:26 - Sullivan Sparkes (3)		First period		No scoring
No scoring		Second period		Rémy Anglehart (2) - 15:30
4:10 - Derek Gentile (6)		Third period		Drake Batherson (7) - 19:05
1:14 - Brett Budgell (4)		First overtime period		No scoring
Matthew Welsh (37 saves / 39 shots)		Goalie stats		Émile Samson (27 saves / 30 shots)

April 25	Charlottetown Islanders	4 – 3	OT	Blainville-Boisbriand Armada	Eastlink Centre	Recap
15:14 - Brett Budgell (5)		First period		Drake Batherson (8) - 5:20
No scoring		Second period		Alexandre Alain (12) - pp - 16:16
9:40 - Derek Gentile (7); 10:27 - Sullivan Sparkes (4)		Third period		Thomas Ethier (5) - 2:04
5:13 - Keith Getson (10)		First overtime period		No scoring
Matthew Welsh (34 saves / 37 shots)		Goalie stats		Émile Samson (22 saves / 26 shots)

April 27	Blainville-Boisbriand Armada	3 – 2	Charlottetown Islanders	Centre d'Excellence Sports Rousseau	Recap
No scoring		First period	No scoring
4:27 - pp - Drake Batherson (9); 10:02 - Luke Henman (4)		Second period	Cameron Askew (3) - pp - 12:16; Derek Gentile (8) - pp - 13:16
11:08 - Alex Barré-Boulet (9)		Third period	No scoring
Émile Samson (23 saves / 25 shots)		Goalie stats	Matthew Welsh (42 saves / 45 shots)

April 29	Charlottetown Islanders	3 – 2	OT	Blainville-Boisbriand Armada	Eastlink Centre	Recap
12:37 - pp - Brett Budgell (6)		First period		No scoring
No scoring		Second period		Alex Barré-Boulet (10) - pp - 4:49; Alexandre Alain (13) - pp - 15:43
17:49 - Nikita Alexandrov (7)		Third period		No scoring
6:08 - pp - Cameron Askew (4)		First overtime period		No scoring
Matthew Welsh (16 saves / 18 shots)		Goalie stats		Émile Samson (36 saves / 39 shots)

May 1	Blainville-Boisbriand Armada	6 – 1	Charlottetown Islanders	Centre d'Excellence Sports Rousseau	Recap
4:25 - Samuel Bolduc (2); 5:04 - sh - Alex Barré-Boulet (11)		First period	No scoring
0:38 - pp - Alexandre Alain (14); 1:41 - Alexandre Alain (15); 10:05 - pp - Alexandre Alain (16); 15:45 - pp - Drake Batherson (10)		Second period	Liam Peyton (1) - 5:40
No scoring		Third period	No scoring
Émile Samson (24 saves / 25 shots)		Goalie stats	Matthew Welsh (34 saves / 40 shots)

Blainville-Boisbriand wins series 4 – 3

=== (2) Acadie–Bathurst Titan vs. (6) Victoriaville Tigres ===
April 20	Acadie–Bathurst Titan	6 – 3	Victoriaville Tigres	K. C. Irving Regional Centre	Recap
7:38 - sh - Justin Ducharme (1); 19:22 - Justin Ducharme (2)		First period	Vitalii Abramov (8) - 4:13
5:44 - pp - Olivier Galipeau (4); 8:28 - sh - Jeffrey Viel (7); 9:49 - Ethan Crossman (7)		Second period	Jimmy Huntington (3) - pp - 16:41
19:05 - en - Jeffrey Viel (8)		Third period	Simon Lafrance (3) - sh - 10:34
Evan Fitzpatrick (24 saves / 27 shots)		Goalie stats	Étienne Montpetit (21 saves / 26 shots); Tristan Côté-Cazenave (8 saves / 8 shots)

April 21	Acadie–Bathurst Titan	7 – 3	Victoriaville Tigres	K. C. Irving Regional Centre	Recap
5:55 - Antoine Morand (2)		First period	Simon Lafrance (4) - 8:53; Vitalii Abramov (9) - 9:27
7:40 - pp - Antoine Morand (3); 14:44 - Samuel L'Italien (1); 16:01 - Jeffrey Viel (9)		Second period	No scoring
9:04 - Antoine Morand (4); 16:39 - pp - Antoine Morand (5); 17:20 - Adam Holwell (4)		Third period	Félix Paré (1) - 13:09
Evan Fitzpatrick (31 saves / 34 shots)		Goalie stats	Étienne Montpetit (41 saves / 48 shots)

April 24	Victoriaville Tigres	1 – 2	Acadie–Bathurst Titan	Colisée Desjardins	Recap
10:42 - Vincent Lanoue (3)		First period	No scoring
No scoring		Second period	Liam Murphy (4) - pp - 9:07
No scoring		Third period	Ethan Crossman (8) - 16:21
Étienne Montpetit (27 saves / 29 shots)		Goalie stats	Evan Fitzpatrick (23 saves / 24 shots)

April 25	Victoriaville Tigres	3 – 4	Acadie–Bathurst Titan	Colisée Desjardins	Recap
10:36 - Max Comtois (4)		First period	Samuel Asselin (3) - 5:01
No scoring		Second period	Jeffrey Viel (10) - 3:19; German Rubtsov (4) - 8:44
2:17 - Félix Lauzon (3); 18:33 - Ivan Kosorenkov (4)		Third period	Jeffrey Viel (11) - 10:51
Étienne Montpetit (26 saves / 30 shots)		Goalie stats	Evan Fitzpatrick (38 saves / 41 shots)

Acadie–Bathurst wins series 4 – 0

== President's Cup Finals ==
=== (1) Blainville-Boisbriand Armada vs. (2) Acadie–Bathurst Titan ===
May 4	Blainville-Boisbriand Armada	4 – 1	Acadie–Bathurst Titan	Centre d'Excellence Sports Rousseau	Recap
1:14 - Charles-Antoine Giguère (4); 4:17 - Luke Henman (5)		First period	No scoring
No scoring		Second period	No scoring
2:15 - Thomas Ethier (6); 7:37 - pp - Alex Barré-Boulet (12)		Third period	Justin Ducharme (3) - sh - 6:23
Émile Samson (29 saves / 30 shots)		Goalie stats	Evan Fitzpatrick (31 saves / 35 shots)

May 5	Blainville-Boisbriand Armada	0 – 4	Acadie–Bathurst Titan	Centre d'Excellence Sports Rousseau	Recap
No scoring		First period	No scoring
No scoring		Second period	Noah Dobson (2) - 3:30
No scoring		Third period	Antoine Morand (6) - 1:48; Antoine Morand (7) - en - 17:12; Ethan Crossman (9) - 19:36
Émile Samson (17 saves / 20 shots)		Goalie stats	Evan Fitzpatrick (27 saves / 27 shots)

May 8	Acadie–Bathurst Titan	5 – 2	Blainville-Boisbriand Armada	K. C. Irving Regional Centre	Recap
10:49 - pp - German Rubtsov (5); 19:23 - pp - Olivier Galipeau (5)		First period	No scoring
19:26 - Antoine Morand (8)		Second period	Joël Teasdale (7) - pp - 12:48; Alex Barré-Boulet (13) - 15:41
12:37 - sh - Samuel L'Italien (2); 15:28 - Jeffrey Viel (12)		Third period	No scoring
Evan Fitzpatrick (26 saves / 28 shots)		Goalie stats	Émile Samson (28 saves / 33 shots)

May 9	Acadie–Bathurst Titan	1 – 5	Blainville-Boisbriand Armada	K. C. Irving Regional Centre	Recap
No scoring		First period	No scoring
No scoring		Second period	Anthony Poulin (2) - 1:21; Alexander Katerinakis (7) - 12:16; Luke Henman (6) - 17:53
8:49 - pp - Adam Holwell (5)		Third period	Drake Batherson (11) - 7:24; Drake Batherson (12) - en - 15:56
Evan Fitzpatrick (20 saves / 24 shots)		Goalie stats	Émile Samson (24 saves / 25 shots)

May 11	Blainville-Boisbriand Armada	3 – 5	Acadie–Bathurst Titan	Centre d'Excellence Sports Rousseau	Recap
3:06 - pp - Joël Teasdale (8)		First period	Samuel L'Italien (3) - 12:35; Michal Ivan (1) - 14:59
7:49 - Alexander Katerinakis (8)		Second period	Ethan Crossman (10) - 3:59
3:47 - Charles-Antoine Giguère (5)		Third period	Noah Dobson (3) - 2:41; Jeffrey Viel (13) - en - 19:53
Émile Samson (28 saves / 32 shots)		Goalie stats	Evan Fitzpatrick (33 saves / 36 shots)

May 13	Acadie–Bathurst Titan	2 – 1	Blainville-Boisbriand Armada	K. C. Irving Regional Centre	Recap
6:37 - Jeffrey Viel (14)		First period	No scoring
17:01 - Samuel L'Italien (4)		Second period	No scoring
No scoring		Third period	17:15 - Drake Batherson (13)
Evan Fitzpatrick (29 saves / 30 shots)		Goalie stats	Émile Samson (24 saves / 26 shots)

Acadie–Bathurst wins series 4 – 2

== Playoff leading scorers ==
Note: GP = Games played; G = Goals; A = Assists; Pts = Points; PIM = Penalty minutes

Player	Team	GP	G	A	Pts	PIM
Drake Batherson	Blainville-Boisbriand Armada	22	13	20	33	19
Alexandre Alain	Blainville-Boisbriand Armada	22	16	14	30	26
Alex Barré-Boulet	Blainville-Boisbriand Armada	18	13	14	27	14
Jeffrey Viel	Acadie–Bathurst Titan	19	14	9	23	34
Joël Teasdale	Blainville-Boisbriand Armada	22	8	13	21	14
Olivier Galipeau	Acadie–Bathurst Titan	20	5	15	20	24
Antoine Morand	Acadie–Bathurst Titan	20	8	11	19	18
Alexander Katerinakis	Blainville-Boisbriand Armada	22	8	9	17	22
Nikita Alexandrov	Charlottetown Islanders	18	7	10	17	8
Ethan Crossman	Acadie–Bathurst Titan	20	10	6	16	12
Vitalii Abramov	Victoriaville Tigres	13	9	7	16	21
Derek Gentile	Charlottetown Islanders	18	8	8	16	4
Ivan Kosorenkov	Victoriaville Tigres	14	4	12	16	16

== Playoff leading goaltenders ==
Note: GP = Games played; Mins = Minutes played; W = Wins; L = Losses: OTL = Overtime losses; SL = Shootout losses; GA = Goals Allowed; SO = Shutouts; GAA = Goals against average

Player	Team	GP	Mins	W	L	GA	SO	Sv%	GAA
Evan Fitzpatrick	Acadie–Bathurst Titan	20	1202:27	16	4	42	2	.925	2.10
Samuel Harvey	Rouyn-Noranda Huskies	7	414:38	3	4	15	1	.945	2.17
Emile Samson	Blainville-Boisbriand Armada	21	1221:31	13	7	45	1	.916	2.21
Olivier Rodrigue	Drummondville Voltigeurs	10	648:06	5	5	27	0	.891	2.50
Matthew Welsh	Charlottetown Islanders	18	1093:13	11	7	48	0	.918	2.63

== Trophies and awards ==
- President's Cup – Playoff Champions: Acadie–Bathurst Titan
- Jean Rougeau Trophy – Regular Season Champions: Blainville-Boisbriand Armada
- Luc Robitaille Trophy – Team with the best goals for average: Drummondville Voltigeurs
- Robert Lebel Trophy – Team with best GAA: Rimouski Océanic

Player

- Michel Brière Memorial Trophy – Most Valuable Player: Alex Barré-Boulet, Blainville-Boisbriand Armada
- Jean Béliveau Trophy – Top Scorer: Alex Barré-Boulet, Blainville-Boisbriand Armada
- Guy Lafleur Trophy – Playoff MVP: Jeffrey Viel, Acadie–Bathurst Titan
- Jacques Plante Memorial Trophy – Top Goaltender: Samuel Harvey, Rouyn-Noranda Huskies
- Guy Carbonneau Trophy – Best Defensive Forward: Samuel Dove-McFalls, Rimouski Océanic
- Emile Bouchard Trophy – Defenceman of the Year: Olivier Galipeau, Acadie–Bathurst Titan
- Kevin Lowe Trophy – Best Defensive Defenceman: Tobbie Paquette-Bisson, Blainville-Boisbriand Armada
- Michael Bossy Trophy – Top Prospect: Filip Zadina, Halifax Mooseheads
- RDS Cup – Rookie of the Year: Alexis Lafrenière, Rimouski Océanic
- Michel Bergeron Trophy – Offensive Rookie of the Year: Alexis Lafrenière, Rimouski Océanic
- Raymond Lagacé Trophy – Defensive Rookie of the Year: Colten Ellis – Rimouski Océanic
- Frank J. Selke Memorial Trophy – Most sportsmanlike player: Joël Teasdale, Blainville-Boisbriand Armada
- QMJHL Humanitarian of the Year – Humanitarian of the Year: Vincent Tremblay-Lapalme, Chicoutimi Saguenéens
- Marcel Robert Trophy – Best Scholastic Player: Alexandre Alain, Blainville-Boisbriand Armada
- Paul Dumont Trophy – Personality of the Year: Dominique Ducharme, Drummondville Voltigeurs

Executive

- Ron Lapointe Trophy – Coach of the Year: Joël Bouchard, Blainville-Boisbriand Armada
- Maurice Filion Trophy – General Manager of the Year: Serge Beausoleil, Rimouski Océanic

=== All-Star teams ===
First All-Star Team:

- Samuel Harvey, Goaltender, Rouyn-Noranda Huskies
- Noah Dobson, Defenceman, Acadie–Bathurst Titan
- Olivier Galipeau, Defenceman, Acadie–Bathurst Titan
- Alexis Lafrenière, Left Wing, Rimouski Océanic
- Alex Barré-Boulet, Centre, Blainville-Boisbriand Armada
- Filip Zadina, Right Wing, Halifax Mooseheads

Second All-Star Team:

- Colten Ellis, Goaltender, Rimouski Océanic
- Nicolas Beaudin, Defenceman, Drummondville Voltigeurs
- Charle-Édouard D'Astous, Defenceman, Rimouski Océanic
- Max Comtois, Left Wing, Victoriaville Tigres
- Vitalii Abramov, Centre, Victoriaville Tigres
- Alexandre Alain, Right Wing, Blainville-Boisbriand Armada

All-Rookie Team:

- Colten Ellis, Goaltender, Rimouski Océanic
- Justin Barron, Defenceman, Halifax Mooseheads
- Radim Salda, Defenceman, Saint John Sea Dogs
- Alexis Lafrenière, Left Wing, Rimouski Océanic
- Jakob Pelletier, Centre, Moncton Wildcats
- Filip Zadina, Right Wing, Halifax Mooseheads

== See also ==
- List of QMJHL seasons
- 2017 in ice hockey
- 2018 in ice hockey
- 2017–18 OHL season
- 2017–18 WHL season
- 2018 Memorial Cup

Preceded by 2017–18 QMJHL season	QMJHL seasons	Succeeded by 2018–19 QMJHL season
