= German Rubtsov =

Russian ice hockey player (born 1998)

- Born: 27 June 1998 (age 28) Chekhov, Russia
- Height: 6 ft 1 in (185 cm)
- Weight: 178 lb (81 kg; 12 st 10 lb)
- Position: Centre
- Shoots: Left
- KHL team Former teams: Spartak Moscow; HC Vityaz; Philadelphia Flyers; HC Sochi
- NHL draft: 22nd overall, 2016; Philadelphia Flyers
- Playing career: 2016–present

German Alexandrovich Rubtsov (Russian: Герман Александрович Рубцов; born 27 June 1998) is a Russian professional ice hockey player. He is currently under contract with HC Spartak Moscow of the Kontinental Hockey League (KHL). He was selected by the Philadelphia Flyers in the first round, 22nd overall, in the 2016 NHL entry draft.

== Playing career ==
He played with Vityaz junior team, Russkie Vityazi, before competing in the 2015–16 season for Team Russia U18 of the Junior Hockey League (MHL).

He signed a three-year entry-level contract with the Flyers on 2 March 2017.

=== Philadelphia Flyers ===
During the 2019–20 season, Rubtsov made his NHL debut with the Flyers on 1 November 2019. He appeared in four games with the Flyers, going scoreless, before returning to the AHL with the Lehigh Valley Phantoms. Rubtsov collected just 2 goals and 13 points in 42 regular-season games with the Phantoms before the season was cancelled due to the COVID-19 pandemic.

Rubtsov was initially named to the Flyers' Return to Play squad to participate in training camp in preparation for the playoffs. He was left off the final roster and on 23 August 2020, he was loaned to Russian club, HC Sochi of the KHL, until the commencement of the delayed 2020–21 North American season. Rubtsov continued with HC Sochi and was later determined to remain with the club for the duration of the campaign, finishing with 3 goals and 11 points through 46 regular season games.

With a year remaining on his entry-level contract with the Flyers, in the off-season, Rubtsov's KHL rights were traded from Sochi to SKA Saint Petersburg on 17 August 2021.

=== Florida Panthers ===
On 19 March 2022, Rubtsov was involved in a trade that sent him along with Claude Giroux, Connor Bunnaman, and a draft pick to the Florida Panthers in exchange for Owen Tippett and some draft picks. Rubtsov only had four NHL games played with the Flyers before the trade.

At the end of the season, Rubstov was not offered a qualifying offer by the Panthers to retain his exclusive playing rights, thereby releasing him to free agency.

=== Return to Russia ===
Un-signed in North America, Rubtsov opted to return to his homeland to continue his career, signing a one-year, two-way contract with KHL outfit, HC Spartak Moscow, on 24 August 2022.

== Career statistics ==
=== Regular season and playoffs ===
			Regular season					Playoffs
Season	Team	League	GP	G	A	Pts	PIM	GP	G	A	Pts	PIM
2014–15	Russkie Vityazi	MHL	11	1	4	5	4	1	0	0	0	0
2015–16	Team Russia U18	MHL	28	12	14	26	10	3	0	1	1	0
2016–17	Vityaz Podolsk	KHL	15	0	0	0	6	—	—	—	—	—
2016–17	Russkie Vityazi	MHL	15	7	8	15	16	—	—	—	—	—
2016–17	Chicoutimi Saguenéens	QMJHL	16	9	13	22	4	—	—	—	—	—
2017–18	Chicoutimi Saguenéens	QMJHL	11	3	8	11	0	—	—	—	—	—
2017–18	Acadie–Bathurst Titan	QMJHL	38	12	20	32	11	19	5	5	10	11
2018–19	Lehigh Valley Phantoms	AHL	14	6	4	10	0	—	—	—	—	—
2019–20	Lehigh Valley Phantoms	AHL	42	2	11	13	20	—	—	—	—	—
2019–20	Philadelphia Flyers	NHL	4	0	0	0	0	—	—	—	—	—
2020–21	HC Sochi	KHL	46	3	8	11	8	—	—	—	—	—
2021–22	Lehigh Valley Phantoms	AHL	37	2	4	6	0	—	—	—	—	—
2021–22	Charlotte Checkers	AHL	5	1	0	1	0	1	0	0	0	0
2022–23	Spartak Moscow	KHL	18	2	1	3	6	—	—	—	—	—
2022–23	Khimik Voskresensk	VHL	23	5	5	10	2	10	3	0	3	4
2023–24	Spartak Moscow	KHL	51	4	6	10	4	11	3	2	5	0
2023–24	Khimik Voskresensk	VHL	1	1	0	1	0	—	—	—	—	—
2024–25	Spartak Moscow	KHL	64	13	12	25	4	12	1	2	3	6
2025–26	Spartak Moscow	KHL	50	14	16	30	8	5	1	1	2	0
KHL totals			244	36	43	79	36	28	5	5	10	6
NHL totals			4	0	0	0	0	—	—	—	—	—

=== International ===
Year	Team	Event	Result	GP	G	A	Pts	PIM
2014	Russia	U17	1st place, gold medalist(s)	6	1	4	5	4
2015	Russia	U18	5th	5	1	1	2	2
2015	Russia	IH18	3rd place, bronze medalist(s)	5	1	3	4	16
2017	Russia	WJC	3rd place, bronze medalist(s)	5	0	0	0	0
Junior totals				21	3	8	11	22

Awards and achievements
Preceded by Travis Konecny	Philadelphia Flyers' first-round draft pick 2016	Succeeded by Nolan Patrick
