= Joe Veleno =

Canadian ice hockey player (born 2000)

- Born: January 13, 2000 (age 26) Kirkland, Quebec, Canada
- Height: 6 ft 1 in (185 cm)
- Weight: 201 lb (91 kg; 14 st 5 lb)
- Position: Centre
- Shoots: Left
- NHL team Former teams: New York Rangers; Malmö Redhawks; Detroit Red Wings; Chicago Blackhawks; Montreal Canadiens
- National team: Canada
- NHL draft: 30th overall, 2018; Detroit Red Wings
- Playing career: 2019–present

Joseph Veleno (born January 13, 2000) is a Canadian professional ice hockey player who is a centre for the New York Rangers of the National Hockey League (NHL). He was selected in the first round, 30th overall, by the Detroit Red Wings in the 2018 NHL entry draft. Veleno has also previously played for the Chicago Blackhawks and Montreal Canadiens.

He was a highly-touted major junior prospect, being one of nine players granted exceptional player status to play major junior one year earlier than most in their age group. He was the first and thus far remains the only such player to play in the Quebec Major Junior Hockey League (QMJHL).

== Playing career ==
=== Junior ===
In June 2015, Veleno became the first minor midget player from Quebec to be granted exceptional player status allowing him to play major junior as a 15-year-old, which led to him being selected first overall in that year's Quebec Major Junior Hockey League (QMJHL) draft by the Saint John Sea Dogs. With this, he would become the fifth player in the history of the Canadian Hockey League (CHL) to be granted exceptional status, following: John Tavares, Aaron Ekblad, Connor McDavid, and Sean Day respectively.

On December 8, 2017, it was announced that Veleno had been traded to the Drummondville Voltigeurs in exchange for three future first-round and two second-round QMJHL draft selections. Collectively, he produced 79 points in 64 games played between Saint John and Drummondville over the course of the 2017–18 QMJHL season.

Veleno was selected with the penultimate pick of the first round (30th overall) by the Detroit Red Wings in the 2018 NHL entry draft. During the ensuing 2018–19 QMJHL season, he registered 42 goals and 62 assists for a total of 104 points, helping the Voltigeurs reach the semi-finals of the QMJHL playoffs adding a further eight goals and nine assists across 16 postseason games.

=== Professional ===
On May 1, 2019, Veleno signed a three-year, entry-level contract with the Red Wings. Initially not making the main roster out of training camp, he began the 2019–20 season with the Grand Rapids Griffins, the team's American Hockey League (AHL) affiliate.

With the 2020–21 NHL season delayed due to the COVID-19 pandemic, and the possibility of an AHL season in doubt, Veleno was loaned to Swedish Hockey League (SHL) club, the Malmö Redhawks, for the 2020–21 season. Due to SHL rules, he was ineligible to return to North America until the Redhawks season concluded. In 46 appearances with the foregoing, Veleno contributed with 11 goals and 20 points, before reassignment by Detroit to Grand Rapids on April 10, 2021. Thereafter, Veleno made his NHL debut for the Red Wings in a game versus the Columbus Blue Jackets on April 27. Ten days later, he scored his first career NHL goal on the power play also against the Blue Jackets.

Skating in all but two games with the Red Wings for the 2023–24 season, Veleno proceeded to set career highs in goals (12), assists (16), and points (28). In July 2024, he agreed to a two-year extension with the team.

On March 7, 2025, Veleno was traded to the Chicago Blackhawks in exchange for goaltender Petr Mrázek and Craig Smith. Prior to the transaction, he appeared in 56 games for the Red Wings during the 2024–25 season and recorded five goals and five assists. Veleno increased his offensive output with the Blackhawks and would finish the regular season with three goals and seven points through 18 total games. Despite this, his tenure with the Blackhawks was short lived as he was traded at the conclusion of the season to the Seattle Kraken in exchange for André Burakovsky on June 21, 2025. Veleno was subsequently placed on unconditional waivers by the Kraken who bought out the remaining year of his tenure on June 30.

Entering the offseason as an unrestricted free agent, Veleno agreed to a one-year contract with the Montreal Canadiens on July 16, 2025. During the 2025–26 season, he was utilized as a depth forward, appearing in 61 games for the Canadiens, posting two goals and three assists. With his team qualifying for the 2026 Stanley Cup playoffs, Veleno did not appear in their first round series against the Tampa Bay Lightning, instead making his postseason debut in the opening game of the Canadiens' second round matchup against the Buffalo Sabres on May 6. Four days later, he registered his first career playoff point, assisting on a goal by teammate Zachary Bolduc.

After not being tendered a qualifying offer by the Canadiens, Veleno was signed to a one-year, $1.2 million deal by the New York Rangers for the 2026–27 season on July 1, 2026.

== International play ==
Medal record

Representing Canada

Ice hockey

World Championships
Gold medal – first place	2023 Finland/Latvia	

World Junior Championships
Gold medal – first place	2020 Czech Republic	

Ivan Hlinka Memorial Tournament
Gold medal – first place	2017 Czech Republic/Slovakia	

Internationally, Veleno first represented Hockey Canada as part of team Canada Black at the 2015 World U-17 Hockey Challenge where his team ultimately finished in last place. Returning again the following year, he would be forced to withdraw from tournament play due to injury.

In 2016 and 2017, Veleno was named to the national under-18 team for the annual Ivan Hlinka Memorial Tournament, capturing a gold medal at the latter iteration. He then served as an alternate captain for the national under-18 team at the IIHF World U18 Championships in April 2018.

After failing to secure a podium finish with the national junior team at the 2019 World Junior Ice Hockey Championships, Veleno would play an integral role in his country's gold medal win in 2020.

In May 2023, he made his national senior team debut at the IIHF World Championship. During a preliminary round match against Switzerland, Veleno stamped on the calf of opposing forward Nino Niederreiter with his skate blade amidst a puck battle. Although not initially assessed a penalty by game officials, he would be subject to a disciplinary hearing resulting in a five-game suspension.

== Personal life ==
Born in Kirkland, Quebec, Veleno is of Italian descent. His favourite team growing up was the Washington Capitals while his favourite player was Alexander Ovechkin. In addition to hockey, Veleno also played soccer and lacrosse as a child. He is fluent in English, French, and Italian.

== Career statistics ==
=== Regular season and playoffs ===
			Regular season					Playoffs
Season	Team	League	GP	G	A	Pts	PIM	GP	G	A	Pts	PIM
2014–15	Lac St-Louis Lions	QMAAA	41	16	36	52	57	12	2	2	4	12
2015–16	Saint John Sea Dogs	QMJHL	62	13	30	43	21	17	6	1	7	8
2016–17	Saint John Sea Dogs	QMJHL	45	13	27	40	18	18	8	3	11	4
2017–18	Saint John Sea Dogs	QMJHL	31	6	25	31	26	—	—	—	—	—
2017–18	Drummondville Voltigeurs	QMJHL	33	16	32	48	22	10	5	6	11	10
2018–19	Drummondville Voltigeurs	QMJHL	59	42	62	104	19	16	8	9	17	12
2019–20	Grand Rapids Griffins	AHL	54	11	12	23	18	—	—	—	—	—
2020–21	Malmö Redhawks	SHL	46	11	9	20	20	—	—	—	—	—
2020–21	Grand Rapids Griffins	AHL	4	1	2	3	4	—	—	—	—	—
2020–21	Detroit Red Wings	NHL	5	1	0	1	4	—	—	—	—	—
2021–22	Grand Rapids Griffins	AHL	11	6	4	10	4	—	—	—	—	—
2021–22	Detroit Red Wings	NHL	66	8	7	15	22	—	—	—	—	—
2022–23	Detroit Red Wings	NHL	81	9	11	20	30	—	—	—	—	—
2023–24	Detroit Red Wings	NHL	80	12	16	28	25	—	—	—	—	—
2024–25	Detroit Red Wings	NHL	56	5	5	10	13	—	—	—	—	—
2024–25	Chicago Blackhawks	NHL	18	3	4	7	4	—	—	—	—	—
2025–26	Montreal Canadiens	NHL	61	2	3	5	19	9	0	1	1	0
SHL totals			46	11	9	20	20	—	—	—	—	—
NHL totals			367	40	46	86	117	9	0	1	1	0

=== International ===
Year	Team	Event	Result	GP	G	A	Pts	PIM
2015	Canada Black	U17	8th	5	1	3	4	6
2016	Canada	IH18	5th	4	0	4	4	2
2017	Canada	IH18	1st place, gold medalist(s)	5	2	5	7	8
2018	Canada	U18	5th	4	0	3	3	0
2019	Canada	WJC	6th	5	0	2	2	0
2020	Canada	WJC	1st place, gold medalist(s)	6	1	5	6	8
2023	Canada	WC	1st place, gold medalist(s)	5	2	3	5	2
Junior totals				29	4	22	26	24
Senior totals				5	2	3	5	2

== Awards and honours ==
Award	Year	Ref
QMJHL
President's Cup champion	2017	
First All-Star Team	2019	
CHL
CHL Canada/Russia Series	2017, 2018	
CHL/NHL Top Prospects Game	2018	

Awards and achievements
Preceded by Filip Zadina	Detroit Red Wings first-round draft pick 2018	Succeeded by Moritz Seider
