= Luke Henman =

Canadian ice hockey player (born 2000)

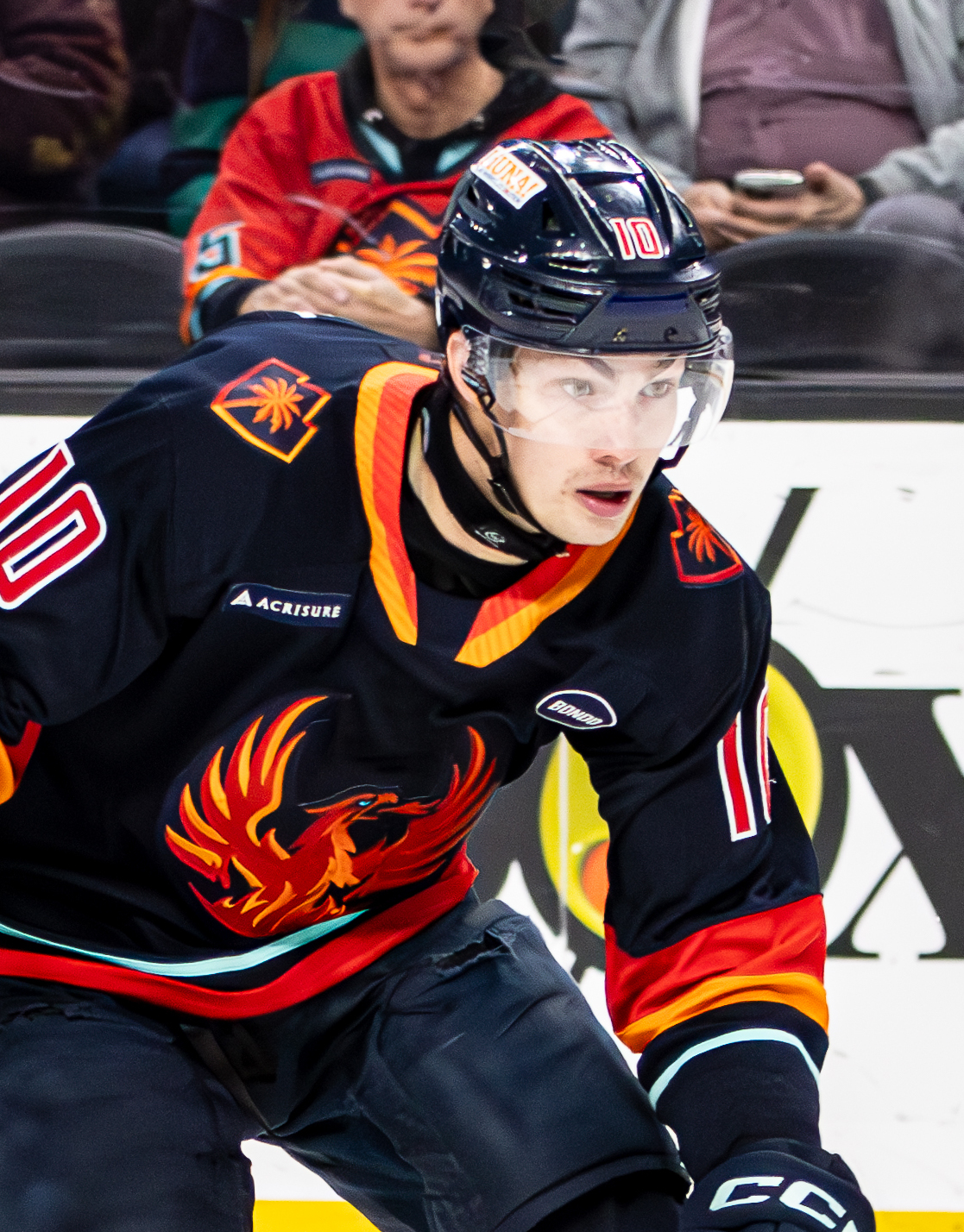
- Henman with the Coachella Valley Firebirds in 2025
- Born: April 29, 2000 (age 26) Dartmouth, Nova Scotia, Canada
- Height: 6 ft 0 in (183 cm)
- Weight: 152 lb (69 kg; 10 st 12 lb)
- Position: Centre
- Shoots: Left
- Liiga team: Ilves
- NHL draft: 96th overall, 2018; Carolina Hurricanes
- Playing career: 2021–present

Luke Henman (born April 29, 2000) is a Canadian professional ice hockey centre who is currently playing for Ilves of the Finnish Liiga. He was selected in the fourth round, 96th overall, in the 2018 NHL entry draft by the Carolina Hurricanes.

A native of Dartmouth, Nova Scotia, Henman played junior hockey in the area with the Dartmouth Whalers and Dartmouth Steele. He was then was selected by the Cape Breton Screaming Eagles in the 2016 Quebec Major Junior Hockey League draft, but he was traded to the Blainville-Boisbriand Armada before playing a game with the team. After playing six games with the Armada and then returning to the Steele during the 2016–17 season, Henman played four full seasons with the Armada. In 2021, Henman signed a contract with the Seattle Kraken, becoming the first player in Kraken history to sign with the team. Debuting professionally that year, Henman only played for the Kraken's minor league affiliates—the Charlotte Checkers, Allen Americans, and the Coachella Valley Firebirds. In 2025, he signed with Ilves, his first European team.

== Playing career ==
=== Major junior ===
Henman was born on April 29, 2000, in Dartmouth, Nova Scotia. Growing up, he played junior hockey locally with the Dartmouth Whalers of the Nova Scotia Major Bantam Hockey League, starting in 2012 and playing for three seasons. For the 2015–16 season, he joined the Dartmouth Steele, of the Nova Scotia U18 Major Hockey League, putting up 15 goals and 21 assists for 36 points through 38 games, also participating in the Telus Cup.

On June 6, 2016, Henman was picked in the second round, 21st overall, by the Cape Breton Screaming Eagles in the 2016 Quebec Major Junior Hockey League (QMJHL) draft. On August 29, he was traded to the Blainville-Boisbriand Armada for forward Tyler Hylland and a fourth-round pick in the 2018 QMJHL draft. Henman made his QMJHL debut on October 28, in a 3–1 loss to the Gatineau Olympiques. Two days later, he recorded his first QMJHL point, an assist, on a goal by Guillaume Beaudoin in a 4–2 victory over the Olympiques. On December 9, Henman recorded two assists in a 3–0 win against the Halifax Mooseheads. On November 11, he tallied his first QMJHL goal in a 7–0 defeat of the Victoriaville Tigres. He finished the 2016–17 season with only that one goal and those three assists through six games. Henman then returned to the Dartmouth Steele, notching 24 goals and 36 assists for 60 points in 35 games. He then played only one game with the Armada during the 2017 QMJHL playoffs, recording no points.

Midway through the 2017–18 season, Henman was an honorable mention for Rookie of the Month for December, with 12 assists through 11 games that month. Near the end of January 2018, he was one of 36 QMJHL players listed in the NHL Central Scouting Bureau's Midterm Draft Rankings. In April, he was one of 143 Canadian Hockey League (CHL) players in the Bureau's Final Rankings. Between the Midterm and Final Rankings, Henman had climbed 64 spots, finishing 83rd among North American skaters. He finished the regular season with nine goals and 38 assists for 47 points. During the 2018 QMJHL playoffs, he recorded six goals and eight assists in 20 games, as the Armada reached the President's Cup final, losing to the Acadie-Bathurst Titan in six games. On June 23, Henman was selected by the Carolina Hurricanes in the fourth round, 96th overall, of the 2018 NHL entry draft. Prior to the 2018–19 season, Henman participated in the Hurricanes' training camp. On September 16, 2018, he was reassigned to the Armada. That same day, he was named an alternate captain of the Armada. On February 17, 2019, he recorded two goals and one assist in an 8–4 defeat at the hands of the Sherbrooke Phoenix. Henman ended the season with 12 goals and 34 assists for 46 points, ranking second on the team.

Before the 2019–20 season, Henman again took part in the Hurricanes' training camp. He was returned to the Armada on September 14, 2019. With the team, he was named to the QMJHL Team of the Week for the week of December 30, 2019, with one goal and six assists. On January 6, he was named captain of the Armada, due to his natural leadership. He was named to the Team of the Week for each of the next two weeks, with four goals and two assists and four goals and three assists, respectively. In the latter week, Henman was named the QMJHL player of the week. He finished the season with 25 goals and 49 assists in 63 games. During the 2020–21 season, his last junior season, Henman was named the Player of the Week and to the Team of the Week for the week of November 30, 2020, with four goals and six assists. Henman was later named to the team of the week for the week of February 1, 2021, with four goals and four assists. On May 12, 2021, he agreed to a three-year, entry-level contract with the NHL's Seattle Kraken, becoming the first player in Kraken history to sign with the franchise. Henman, riding out his final season, was named to the team of the week for the week of May 17, 2021, with six goals and one assist. He totaled 16 goals and 27 assists for 43 points during 32 games of the season. During the 2021 QMJHL playoffs, he notched 12 points in nine games. Henman left the Armada leading the team in career assists, with 151, and points, with 214.

=== Professional ===
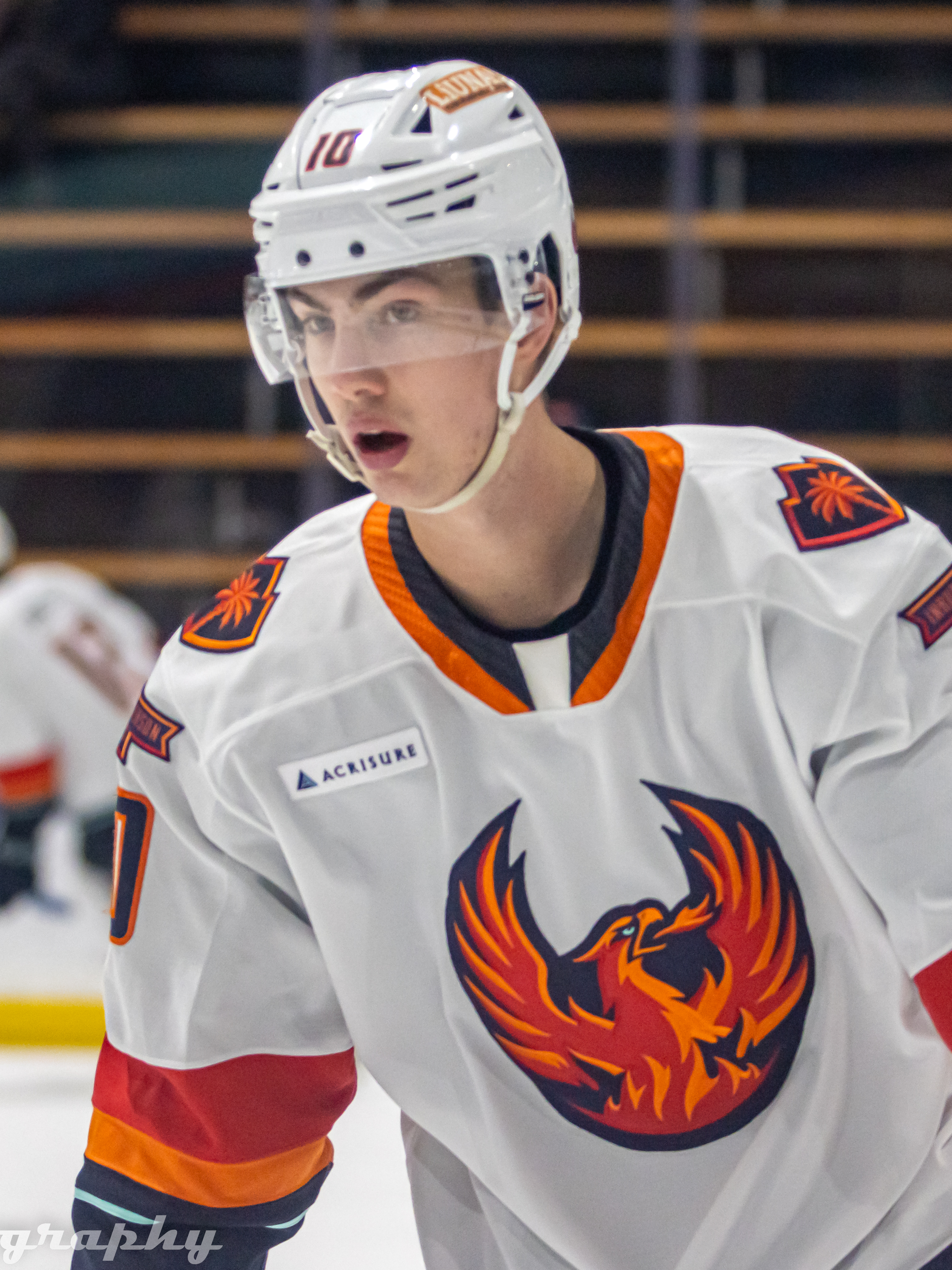
Henman with the Firebirds in February 2022

Before the start of the 2021–22 season, Henman participated in the Kraken's training camp. On October 2, 2021, he was assigned to the Seattle Kraken's AHL affiliate, the Charlotte Checkers. He was named to the Checkers' opening night roster, and he made his professional debut with the team on October 17. Less than two minutes into a November 6 game against the Lehigh Valley Phantoms, Henman scored his first professional goal as part of a 7–3 win for the Checkers. On December 8, he was assigned to the Kraken's ECHL affiliate, the Allen Americans. Henman notched four goals and two assists, including a hat-trick, with the Americans before being called up to the Checkers again on December 13. He finished the regular season with six goals and eight assists for 14 points through 50 games. On April 8, 2022, Henman scored a first-period goal in a 3–2 Checkers victory over the Hartford Wolf Pack, helping the Checkers clinch a spot in the 2021 Calder Cup playoffs. He played two postseason games, in which he recorded no points.

The Kraken established a new AHL affiliate for the 2022–23 season, the Coachella Valley Firebirds, and Henman was named to its inaugural roster. On December 23, 2022, the Firebirds' teddy bear toss night, Henman scored on the Henderson Silver Knights' Jiri Patera with 6:23 left in the third period, sending 7,278 teddy bears down from the stands, in the only goal of the game. He finished the season with seven goals and eight assists for 15 points in 67 games. During the Firebirds inaugural playoff run, he tallied two goals and three assists in 13 games. During the 2023–24 season, Henman achieved a four-game point streak from February 23 to March 26, 2024. In total, he recorded seven goals and seven assists in 45 games. During the 2024 Calder Cup playoffs, he put up four points in 14 games. After the season on June 30, 2024, a day before the start of free agency, the Kraken re-signed Henman to a one-year contract. During the 2024–25 season, Henman once again scored during the Firebirds' teddy bear toss night, this time scoring 3:09 into the game, sending 15,287 teddy bears down. He finished the season with six goals and 10 assists through 59 games. During the playoffs, he tallied one assist in six games.

On August 1, 2025, as a free agent, following four seasons within the Kraken organization, Henman opted to sign abroad, agreeing to a one-year contract with Ilves of the Finnish Liiga. Henman's first goal with Ilves just 52 seconds into the first game of the 2025–26 Champions Hockey League, helping the team to a 3–1 win over ERC Ingolstadt. He made his Liiga debut during the team's season opener on September 10. He recorded both his first goal and assist of the 2025–26 Liiga season with the team in a 5–4 overtime loss to KalPa. On October 17, he tallied two goals and an assist in a 4–3 overtime victory over HC TPS. On December 26, Henman recorded three assists in an 8–3 defeat of HPK. He finished the season with 17 goals and 25 assists for 42 points through 55 games. On April 19, 2026, in the playoffs, he notched one goal and three assists in a 6–0 victory over Tappara. During the playoffs, he totaled three goals and seven assists in 13 games.

== Career statistics ==
| | | | Regular season | | | | | Playoffs |
| Season | Team | League | GP | G | A | Pts | PIM | GP | G | A | Pts | PIM |
|---|---|---|---|---|---|---|---|---|---|---|---|---|
| 2016–17 | Blainville-Boisbriand Armada | QMJHL | 6 | 1 | 3 | 4 | 0 | 1 | 0 | 0 | 0 | 0 |
| 2017–18 | Blainville-Boisbriand Armada | QMJHL | 61 | 9 | 38 | 47 | 16 | 20 | 6 | 8 | 14 | 6 |
| 2018–19 | Blainville-Boisbriand Armada | QMJHL | 63 | 12 | 34 | 46 | 18 | — | — | — | — | — |
| 2019–20 | Blainville-Boisbriand Armada | QMJHL | 63 | 25 | 49 | 74 | 43 | — | — | — | — | — |
| 2020–21 | Blainville-Boisbriand Armada | QMJHL | 32 | 16 | 27 | 43 | 20 | 9 | 9 | 3 | 12 | 10 |
| 2021–22 | Charlotte Checkers | AHL | 50 | 6 | 8 | 14 | 32 | 2 | 0 | 0 | 0 | 4 |
| 2021–22 | Allen Americans | ECHL | 3 | 4 | 2 | 6 | 0 | — | — | — | — | — |
| 2022–23 | Coachella Valley Firebirds | AHL | 67 | 7 | 8 | 15 | 41 | 13 | 2 | 3 | 5 | 2 |
| 2023–24 | Coachella Valley Firebirds | AHL | 45 | 7 | 7 | 14 | 29 | 14 | 1 | 3 | 4 | 4 |
| 2024–25 | Coachella Valley Firebirds | AHL | 59 | 6 | 10 | 16 | 15 | 6 | 0 | 1 | 1 | 4 |
| 2025–26 | Ilves | Liiga | 55 | 17 | 25 | 42 | 24 | 13 | 3 | 7 | 10 | 2 |
| AHL totals | | | 221 | 26 | 33 | 59 | 117 | 35 | 3 | 7 | 10 | 14 |
| Liiga totals | | | 55 | 17 | 25 | 42 | 24 | 13 | 3 | 7 | 10 | 2 |
