= Nikita Alexandrov =

Russian ice hockey player (born 2000)

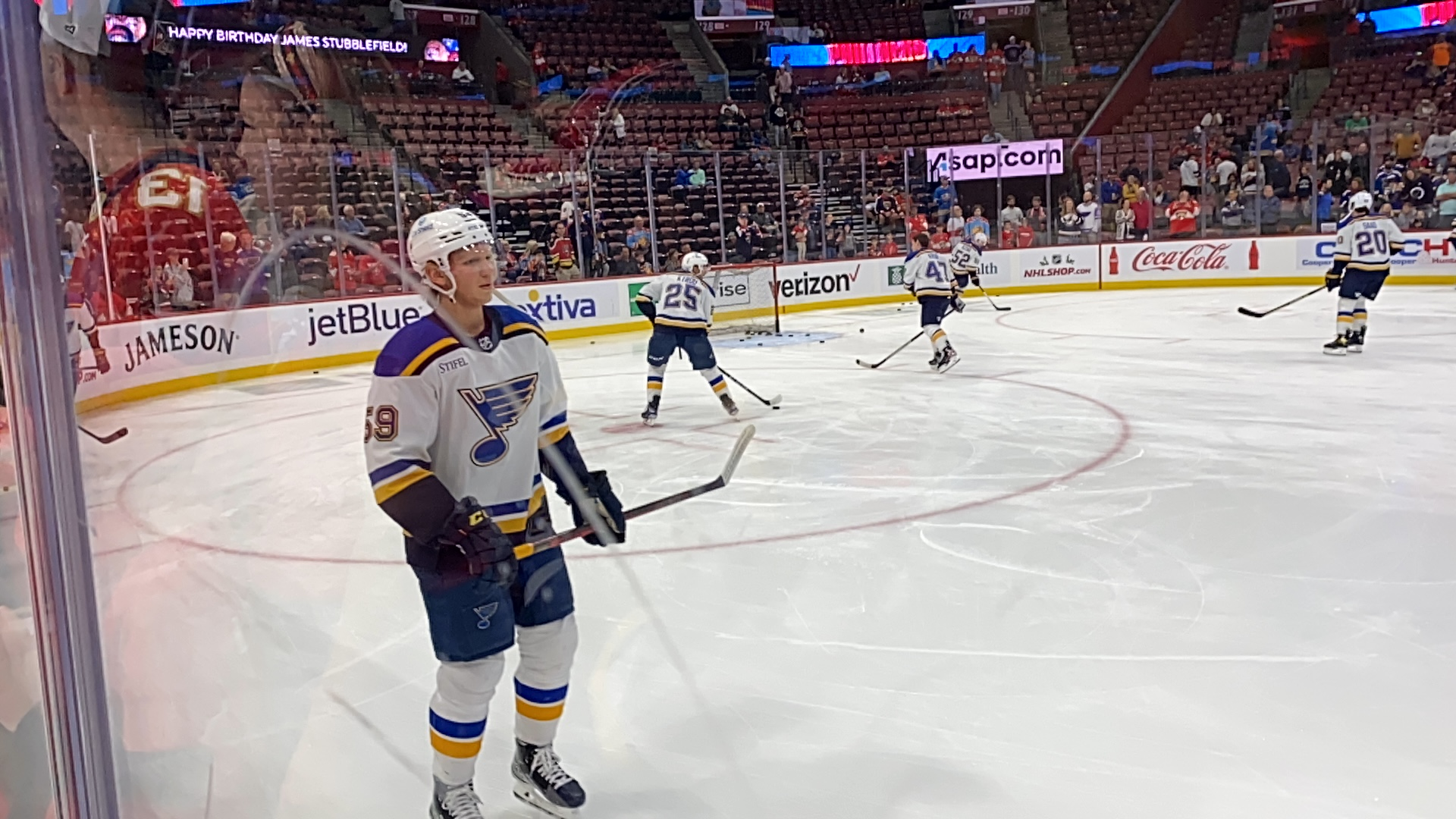
- Alexandrov with the St. Louis Blues in 2022
- Born: 16 September 2000 (age 26) Burgwedel, Germany
- Height: 6 ft 1 in (185 cm)
- Weight: 189 lb (86 kg; 13 st 7 lb)
- Position: Centre
- Shoots: Left
- KHL team Former teams: Shanghai Dragons; KooKoo; St. Louis Blues
- NHL draft: 62nd overall, 2019; St. Louis Blues
- Playing career: 2020–present

Nikita Igorevich Alexandrov (Russian: Никита Игоревич Александров; born 16 September 2000) is a German-born Russian professional ice hockey forward who is currently signed with the Shanghai Dragons of the Kontinental Hockey League (KHL). He most recently played for the Ontario Reign of the American Hockey League (AHL), while under contract to the Los Angeles Kings of the National Hockey League (NHL). He was drafted 62nd overall by the Blues in the second round of the 2019 NHL entry draft.

== Playing career ==
=== Junior ===
In Germany, Alexandrov played junior hockey for Iserlohner EC in the German Development League (DNL), before being drafted 50th overall by the Charlottetown Islanders for the Quebec Major Junior Hockey League (QMJHL) in the 2017 CHL Import Draft.

On 22 September 2017, Alexandrov made his QMJHL debut and first QMJHL assist in a 3–1 loss against the Moncton Wildcats. On 4 November 2017, Alexandrov scored his first QMJHL goal and hat-trick in a 5–4 overtime win against the Sherbrooke Phoenix. Overall, he played 66 games with 13 goals and 18 assists, helping the Islanders reach the semi-finals of the 2018 QMJHL playoffs.

In the 2018–19 season, Alexandrov improved on his rookie season with 27 goals and 34 assists in 64 games played. For the 2019–20 season, he was named the alternate captain of the Islanders, playing 42 games with 23 goals and 31 assists in the shortened season.

=== Professional ===
After being drafted 62nd overall by the St. Louis Blues in the second round of the 2019 NHL entry draft, the Blues signed Alexandrov to a three-year entry-level contract on 1 August 2019.

On 29 December 2020, the Blues loaned Alexandrov to KooKoo in the Liiga. He made his professional debut in a 3–2 win against KalPa on 13 January 2021. On 23 February 2021, he scored his first professional goal in a 3–2 loss against HIFK, before finishing his season with the Utica Comets of the American Hockey League (AHL).

On 2 December 2025, Alexandrov was traded to the Los Angeles Kings in exchange for Akil Thomas.

On 1 September 2026 it was announced that Alexandrov signed a one-year deal with the Shanghai Dragons in the Kontinental Hockey League (KHL).

== International play ==
Medal record

Representing Russia

Ice hockey

World Junior Championships
Silver medal – second place	2020 Czech Republic	

Alexandrov represented Russia men's national junior ice hockey team at the 2020 World Junior Ice Hockey Championships, winning a silver medal.

== Career statistics ==
=== Regular season and playoffs ===
			Regular season					Playoffs
Season	Team	League	GP	G	A	Pts	PIM	GP	G	A	Pts	PIM
2016–17	Iserlohner EC	DNL	36	32	29	61	30	4	2	3	5	54
2017–18	Charlottetown Islanders	QMJHL	66	13	18	31	22	18	7	10	17	8
2018–19	Charlottetown Islanders	QMJHL	64	27	34	61	36	6	4	3	7	0
2019–20	Charlottetown Islanders	QMJHL	42	23	31	54	42	—	—	—	—	—
2020–21	KooKoo	Liiga	28	3	6	9	14	2	0	0	0	0
2020–21	Utica Comets	AHL	7	3	2	5	0	—	—	—	—	—
2021–22	Springfield Thunderbirds	AHL	67	12	18	30	26	18	2	6	8	8
2022–23	Springfield Thunderbirds	AHL	41	19	19	38	18	2	0	2	2	0
2022–23	St. Louis Blues	NHL	28	3	4	7	8	—	—	—	—	—
2023–24	St. Louis Blues	NHL	23	0	2	2	4	—	—	—	—	—
2023–24	Springfield Thunderbirds	AHL	7	3	4	7	0	—	—	—	—	—
2024–25	Springfield Thunderbirds	AHL	48	21	28	49	20	3	0	0	0	0
2025–26	Springfield Thunderbirds	AHL	18	3	11	14	8	—	—	—	—	—
2025–26	Ontario Reign	AHL	48	13	29	42	20	5	1	1	2	0
Liiga totals			28	3	6	9	14	2	0	0	0	0
NHL totals			51	3	6	9	12	—	—	—	—	—

=== International ===
Year	Team	Event	Result	GP	G	A	Pts	PIM
2020	Russia	WJC	2nd place, silver medalist(s)	7	2	6	8	4
Junior totals				7	2	6	8	4
