= Nicolas Beaudin =

Canadian ice hockey player (born 1999)

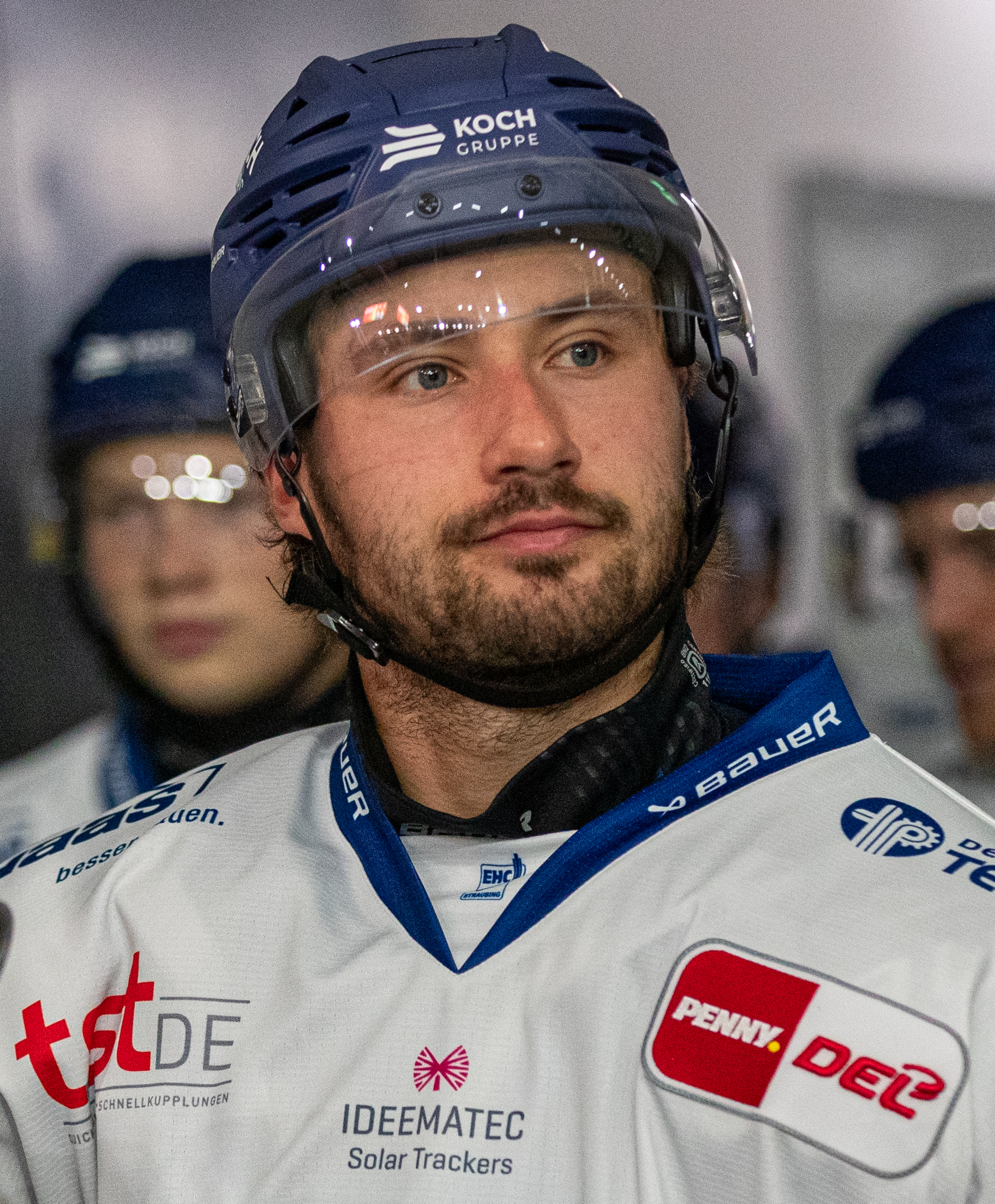
- Beaudin with the Straubing Tigers in 2025
- Born: October 7, 1999 (age 27) Châteauguay, Quebec, Canada
- Height: 5 ft 11 in (180 cm)
- Weight: 185 lb (84 kg; 13 st 3 lb)
- Position: Defence
- Shoots: Left
- DEL team Former teams: Straubing Tigers; Chicago Blackhawks; Sparta Praha; Kometa Brno
- National team: Canada
- NHL draft: 27th overall, 2018; Chicago Blackhawks
- Playing career: 2019–present

Nicolas Beaudin (born October 7, 1999) is a Canadian professional ice hockey player who is a defenceman for the Straubing Tigers of the Deutsche Eishockey Liga (DEL). He was selected in the first round, 27th overall, by the Chicago Blackhawks of the National Hockey League (NHL) in the 2018 NHL entry draft.

== Early life ==
Beaudin was born on October 7, 1999, in Châteauguay, Quebec, to parents Stephane and Annie. Growing up, Stephane played a crucial rule in Beaudin playing hockey and coached him throughout his minor hockey career.

== Playing career ==
Beaudin was selected 39th overall by the Drummondville Voltigeurs of the Quebec Major Junior Hockey League (QMJHL) in the 2015 Canadian Hockey League (CHL) draft. He was awarded the Voltigeurs Offensive Player of the Year award at the conclusion of the 2017–18 season. He finished the season with 12 goals and 69 points in 68 games and was named to the QMJHL Second All-Star Team.

Beaudin was selected 27th overall by the Chicago Blackhawks of the National Hockey League (NHL) in the 2018 NHL entry draft. The second of Chicago's picks in the first round, Beaudin was considered one of the best power play options in the draft. On November 9, Beaudin signed a three-year, entry-level contract with the Blackhawks. He returned to Drummondville for one more season before joining Chicago's American Hockey League (AHL) affiliate, the Rockford IceHogs. In his first pro season, Beaudin recorded three goals and 15 points in 59 games. He was recalled by Chicago after an injury to Adam Boqvist and played his first NHL game on March 11, 2020 versus the San Jose Sharks. During the 2021–22 season, Beaudin initially failed to make the Blackhawks out of training camp, but was instead assigned to the taxi squad during the pandemic-shortened season. After Boqvist suffered another injury, Beaudin made the transition to the main squad and saw significant playing time with the Blackhawks, often paired with Nikita Zadorov. On February 21, 2021, Beaudin scored his first NHL goal on Joonas Korpisalo in a 6–5 loss to the Columbus Blue Jackets.

Beaudin spent the majority of the 2021–22 season in the AHL with Rockford, putting up 16 points in 66 games and appearing in only two games with Chicago. Entering his fourth season within the Blackhawks organization in 2022–23, Beaudin was re-assigned to continue his tenure with the IceHogs having fallen down the depth chart.

Following three games with Rockford, Beaudin was traded by the Blackhawks to the Montreal Canadiens in exchange for Cameron Hillis on October 26, 2022. He was immediately re-assigned to Montreal's AHL affiliate, the Laval Rocket. He played 39 games with Laval, registering two goals and 25 points. On July 13, 2023, Beaudin signed a one-year two-way contract with Montreal. He attended the Canadiens' 2023 training camp but failed to make the team. Beaudin was placed on waivers and after going unclaimed, assigned to Laval to start the 2023–24 season.

On January 29, 2024, Beaudin had his contract terminated following a mutual agreement with the Canadiens. Shortly thereafter, Beaudin signed a one-year contract with Czech-based Sparta Praha on January 31.

== Playing style ==
Beaudin described his playing style as emulating Toronto Maple Leafs defenceman Jake Gardiner.

"He's such a smart guy with his hockey sense and his vision of the game...He often sees a play developing in advance, he knows what will happen, he has good anticipation. He is a proud guy who defends the right way and keeps getting better at it."

— Dominique Ducharme on Beaudin, May 2018

== Career statistics ==
Medal record

Men's ice hockey

Representing Canada

World Championships
Gold medal – first place	2021 Latvia	

=== Regular season and playoffs ===
			Regular season					Playoffs
Season	Team	League	GP	G	A	Pts	PIM	GP	G	A	Pts	PIM
2014–15	Châteauguay Grenadiers	QMAAA	41	3	21	24	22	16	1	12	13	10
2015–16	Châteauguay Grenadiers	QMAAA	21	5	18	23	44	—	—	—	—	—
2015–16	Drummondville Voltigeurs	QMJHL	26	0	1	1	4	3	1	0	1	2
2016–17	Drummondville Voltigeurs	QMJHL	64	5	36	41	26	4	0	0	0	2
2017–18	Drummondville Voltigeurs	QMJHL	68	12	57	69	47	10	3	8	11	2
2018–19	Drummondville Voltigeurs	QMJHL	53	7	49	56	48	16	2	6	8	20
2019–20	Rockford IceHogs	AHL	59	3	12	15	33	—	—	—	—	—
2019–20	Chicago Blackhawks	NHL	1	0	0	0	0	—	—	—	—	—
2020–21	Chicago Blackhawks	NHL	19	2	4	6	2	—	—	—	—	—
2020–21	Rockford IceHogs	AHL	9	2	8	10	4	—	—	—	—	—
2021–22	Rockford IceHogs	AHL	66	2	14	16	68	1	0	0	0	0
2021–22	Chicago Blackhawks	NHL	2	0	0	0	0	—	—	—	—	—
2022–23	Rockford IceHogs	AHL	3	0	1	1	2	—	—	—	—	—
2022–23	Laval Rocket	AHL	39	2	23	25	41	—	—	—	—	—
2023–24	Laval Rocket	AHL	16	0	6	6	6	—	—	—	—	—
2023–24	Sparta Praha	ELH	9	0	3	3	4	3	0	0	0	2
2024–25	Kometa Brno	ELH	52	2	7	9	37	20	0	4	4	8
2025–26	Straubing Tigers	DEL	51	6	21	27	38	6	0	1	1	2
NHL totals			22	2	4	6	2	—	—	—	—	—

=== International ===
Year	Team	Event	Result	GP	G	A	Pts	PIM
2021	Canada	WC	1st place, gold medalist(s)	10	0	1	1	0
2023	Canada	SC	4th	4	0	0	0	2
Senior totals				14	0	1	1	2

Awards and achievements
Preceded by Adam Boqvist	Chicago Blackhawks first-round draft pick 2018	Succeeded by Kirby Dach
