= Samuel Bolduc =

Canadian ice hockey player (born 2000)

- Born: December 9, 2000 (age 25) Laval, Quebec, Canada
- Height: 6 ft 4 in (193 cm)
- Weight: 224 lb (102 kg; 16 st 0 lb)
- Position: Defence
- Shoots: Left
- NHL team (P) Cur. team Former teams: Ottawa Senators; Belleville Senators (AHL); New York Islanders
- NHL draft: 57th overall, 2019; New York Islanders
- Playing career: 2021–present

Samuel Bolduc (born December 9, 2000) is a Canadian professional ice hockey defenceman for the Belleville Senators of the American Hockey League (AHL) while under contract to the Ottawa Senators of the National Hockey League (NHL). He was selected by the New York Islanders in the second round, 57th overall, at the 2019 NHL entry draft. Bolduc played four seasons of junior hockey in the Quebec Major Junior Hockey League (QMJHL) with the Blainville-Boisbriand Armada and Sherbrooke Phoenix.

== Playing career ==
=== Amateur ===
Bolduc was selected by the Blainville-Boisbriand Armada of the Quebec Major Junior Hockey League (QMJHL) in the 2016 QMJHL entry draft in the fourth round, 60th overall. He made his debut with the Armada in the 2016–17 season, making six appearances and going scoreless. Though he never played in the playoffs, the Armada advanced to the league championship where they lost to the Saint John Sea Dogs. He broke into the team full time in the 2017–18 season, playing in 57 games, scoring two goals and 12 assists for 14 points. The Armada made the league playoff final for the second consecutive year but were defeated again, this time by the Acadie–Bathurst Titan. In 20 playoff games, he added two goals and seven points. In his third season with the Armada in 2018–19, he played in 65 games, scoring nine goals and 37 points. He was one of the few veteran players remaining from the previous teams as the Armada began the cycle of rebuilding after two years of going to the final. However, the team still managed to make the playoffs but were bounced in the first round by the Sherbrooke Phoenix. In five games he tallied one goal and two points. He started the 2019–20 season with the Armada before getting traded to the Sherbrooke Phoenix on December 15, 2019. In 32 games with the Armada, he scored seven goals and 16 points. With the Phoenix he scored four goals and 27 games in 29 games before the league was stopped on account of the COVID-19 pandemic on March 17, 2020.

=== Professional ===
Bolduc was selected in the second round, 57th overall, by the New York Islanders of the National Hockey League (NHL) in the 2019 NHL entry draft. On April 30, 2020, he was signed to a three-year entry-level contract by the Islanders. He was assigned to their American Hockey League (AHL) affiliate, the Bridgeport Sound Tigers, for the pandemic-shortened 2020–21 season. In 24 games, he scored six goals and 14 points. He was considered one of the few bright spots on the team as the Sound Tigers failed to make the playoffs. As a result he was named to the 2020–21 AHL Atlantic-Division All-Star Team. He was sent to New York's now renamed AHL affiliate, the Bridgeport Islanders, for the 2021–22 season. He spent the entire season in the AHL, tallying two goals and seven points in 57 games. Bridgeport qualified for the 2022 Calder Cup playoffs, but Bolduc did not see any playing time.

He began the 2022–23 season in Bridgeport and for his play in the AHL, he was named to play in the 2023 AHL All-Star Classic as the team's sole representative. In 56 games with Bridgeport, he scored ten goals and 35 points. He was recalled by New York on January 23, 2023 and made his NHL debut that night in a 5–2 loss to the Toronto Maple Leafs on January 23, 2023. His first NHL point, a goal, came on February 7 against the Seattle Kraken. It was the first goal of the game and the game-winning goal of a 4–0 Islanders victory. He finished the season with New York scoring two goals and three points in 17 games. New York made the 2023 Stanley Cup playoffs and faced the Carolina Hurricanes in the opening round. He made his NHL playoff debut on April 17 in game one of the series playing on the third pairing with Noah Dobson, replacing the injured Alexander Romanov. He played in two of New York's playoff games, going scoreless. On June 20, he signed a two-year contract with the Islanders. He made New York's roster out of training camp for the 2023–24 season as the team's seventh defenceman. He made his season debut on October 17 in a 1–0 win over the Arizona Coyotes, replacing the injured Scott Mayfield. However, by February 2024, he was a regular healthy scratch from the lineup, sitting out seven of 13 games. He was assigned to Bridgeport on a conditioning assignment on February 24. By March, he was back with New York, but remained a healthy scratch. He got into a game on April 17 for the first time since January 27, a 5–4 win over the Pittsburgh Penguins, with the team making the 2024 Stanley Cup playoffs. He finished the season with two goals and five points in 34 games with the Islanders and one assist in five games with Bridgeport. He did not play for the Islanders in the playoffs. He began the following 2024–25 season in the AHL with Bridgeport after going unclaimed on waivers. He was recalled on November 3 after the defencemen Romanov, Mike Reilly, and Adam Pelech all suffered injuries. He made one appearance with New York in a 5–2 loss to the New York Rangers before being returned to Bridgeport. He spent the rest of the season in the AHL and finished with nine goals and 35 points in 69 games. A restricted free agent in the offseason, he was not tendered a qualifying offer by the Islanders, making him an unrestricted free agent.

Bolduc left the Islanders and was signed to a one-year, two-way contract with the Los Angeles Kings on July 2, 2025. He was placed on waivers on October 1, and after clearing, was assigned to the Kings' AHL affiliate, the Ontario Reign. He spent the entire 2025–26 season in the AHL. In 56 games with the Reign, he scored five goals and 21 points. On March 12, 2026, Bolduc was traded to the Ottawa Senators, in exchange for forward Jan Jeník. He was assigned to Ottawa's AHL affiliate, the Belleville Senators. In 12 games with Belleville, he added one goal and 10 points. Bolduc signed a one-year, two-way contract with the Ottawa Senators on June 26, 2026. He was placed on waivers by the Senators at the end of training camp and after going unclaimed, was assigned to Ottawa's AHL affiliate, the Belleville Senators, to start the 2026–27 season.

== Career statistics ==
			Regular season					Playoffs
Season	Team	League	GP	G	A	Pts	PIM	GP	G	A	Pts	PIM
2016–17	Laval-Montréal Rousseau Royal	QMAAA	37	3	12	15	6	8	1	1	2	2
2016–17	Blainville-Boisbriand Armada	QMJHL	6	0	0	0	0	—	—	—	—	—
2017–18	Blainville-Boisbriand Armada	QMJHL	57	2	12	14	8	20	2	5	7	0
2018–19	Blainville-Boisbriand Armada	QMJHL	65	9	28	37	27	5	1	1	2	4
2019–20	Blainville-Boisbriand Armada	QMJHL	32	7	9	16	14	—	—	—	—	—
2019–20	Sherbrooke Phoenix	QMJHL	29	4	23	27	12	—	—	—	—	—
2020–21	Bridgeport Sound Tigers	AHL	24	6	8	14	10	—	—	—	—	—
2021–22	Bridgeport Islanders	AHL	57	2	5	7	16	—	—	—	—	—
2022–23	Bridgeport Islanders	AHL	56	10	25	35	31	—	—	—	—	—
2022–23	New York Islanders	NHL	17	2	1	3	2	2	0	0	0	4
2023–24	New York Islanders	NHL	34	2	3	5	6	—	—	—	—	—
2023–24	Bridgeport Islanders	AHL	5	1	0	1	2	—	—	—	—	—
2024–25	Bridgeport Islanders	AHL	69	9	26	35	6	—	—	—	—	—
2024–25	New York Islanders	NHL	1	0	0	0	0	—	—	—	—	—
2025–26	Ontario Reign	AHL	56	5	16	21	18	—	—	—	—	—
2025–26	Belleville Senators	AHL	12	1	9	10	6	—	—	—	—	—
NHL totals			52	4	4	8	8	2	0	0	0	4

== Awards and honours ==
Award	Year
AHL
Atlantic Division All-Star Team	2021
