= Jonathan Aspirot =

Canadian ice hockey player (born 1999)

- Born: May 16, 1999 (age 27) Mascouche, Quebec, Canada
- Height: 6 ft 0 in (183 cm)
- Weight: 212 lb (96 kg; 15 st 2 lb)
- Position: Defence
- Shoots: Left
- NHL team: Boston Bruins
- NHL draft: Undrafted
- Playing career: 2019–present

Jonathan Aspirot (born May 16, 1999) is a Canadian professional ice hockey player who is a defenceman for the Boston Bruins of the National Hockey League (NHL).

== Playing career ==
The Boston Bruins signed Aspirot to a one-year, two-way contract on July 1, 2025. He began the 2025–26 season with the Providence Bruins, recording one goal and three points in five games. On October 26, he was promoted to the NHL as a replacement for an injured Hampus Lindholm. Although Lindholm returned to the roster the next day, Aspirot made his debut on October 28 as a replacement for Mason Lohrei, who was a healthy scratch. He skated on the third defensive pair with Henri Jokiharju against the New York Islanders. He scored his first NHL goal on December 2, 2025, in a 5–4 loss against the Detroit Red Wings.

== Career statistics ==
			Regular season					Playoffs
Season	Team	League	GP	G	A	Pts	PIM	GP	G	A	Pts	PIM
2016–17	Moncton Wildcats	QMJHL	64	3	9	12	37	—	—	—	—	—
2017–18	Moncton Wildcats	QMJHL	67	7	19	26	71	10	3	3	6	20
2018–19	Moncton Wildcats	QMJHL	57	12	23	35	59	10	1	1	2	10
2019–20	Belleville Senators	AHL	44	2	14	16	39	—	—	—	—	—
2020–21	Belleville Senators	AHL	27	7	6	13	32	—	—	—	—	—
2021–22	Belleville Senators	AHL	47	5	13	18	52	2	0	0	0	0
2022–23	Belleville Senators	AHL	43	5	11	16	65	—	—	—	—	—
2023–24	Calgary Wranglers	AHL	66	6	27	33	80	6	1	2	3	2
2024–25	Calgary Wranglers	AHL	65	5	24	29	54	2	0	2	2	2
2025–26	Providence Bruins	AHL	5	1	2	3	4	—	—	—	—	—
2025–26	Boston Bruins	NHL	61	3	10	13	43	6	0	2	2	2
NHL totals			61	3	10	13	43	6	0	2	2	2
