= Alex Barré-Boulet =

Canadian ice hockey player (born 1997)

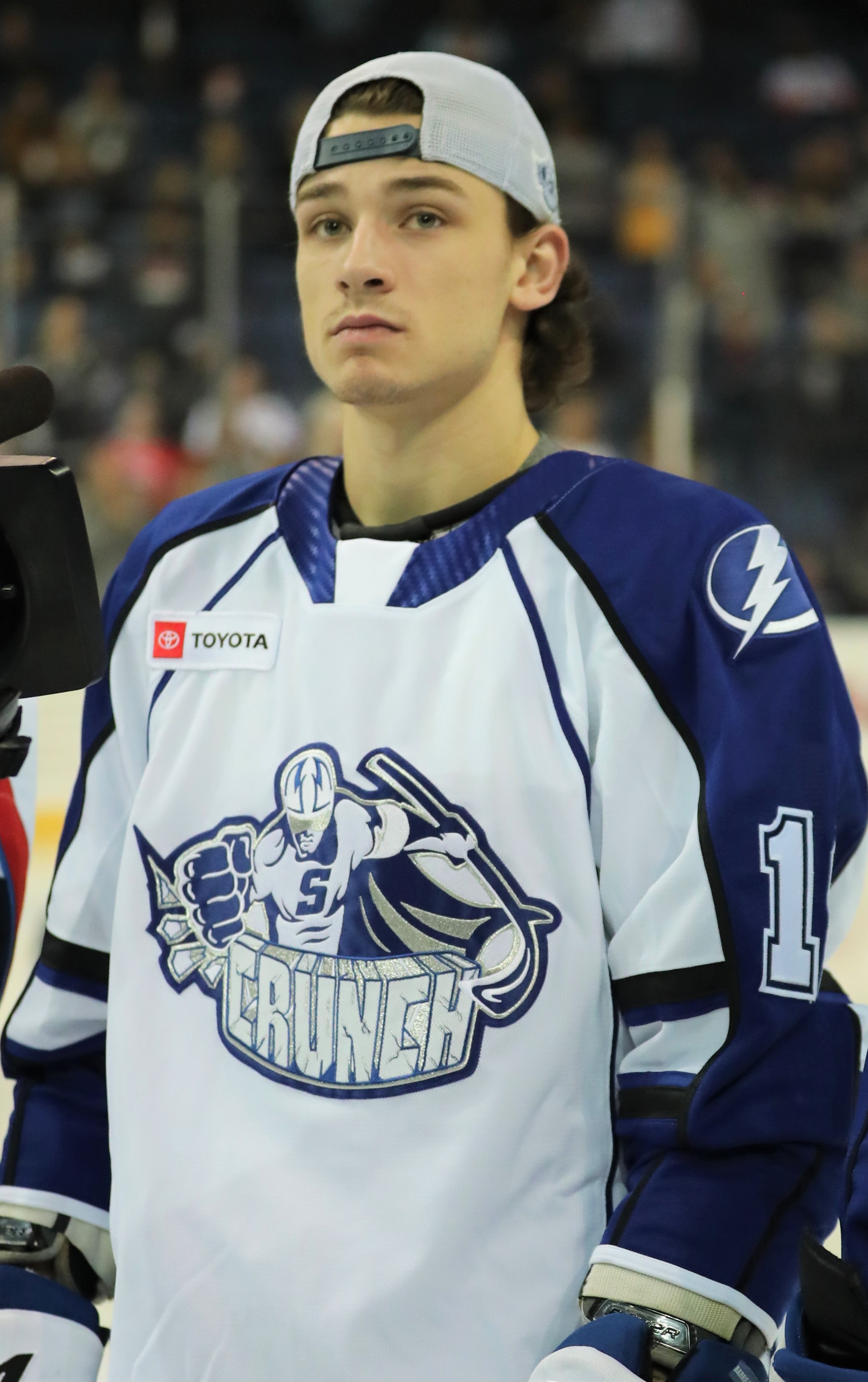
- Barré-Boulet with the Syracuse Crunch in 2020
- Born: May 21, 1997 (age 29) Montmagny, Quebec, Canada
- Height: 5 ft 10 in (178 cm)
- Weight: 180 lb (82 kg; 12 st 12 lb)
- Position: Forward
- Shoots: Left
- NHL team (P) Cur. team Former teams: San Jose Sharks; San Jose Barracuda (AHL); Tampa Bay Lightning; Seattle Kraken; Montreal Canadiens; Colorado Avalanche
- NHL draft: Undrafted
- Playing career: 2018–present

Alex Barré-Boulet (born May 21, 1997) is a Canadian professional ice hockey player who is a forward for the San Jose Barracuda of the American Hockey League (AHL), while under contract to the San Jose Sharks of the National Hockey League (NHL). Originally undrafted by teams in the NHL, he signed as an unrestricted free agent with the Tampa Bay Lightning in March 2018. Barré-Boulet has also previously played for the Seattle Kraken, Montreal Canadiens and Colorado Avalanche.

== Playing career ==
=== Junior ===
Barré-Boulet played at the midget level in his native Quebec with both the Rive-Sud Express Midget Espoir and Lévis Commandeurs of the Quebec Junior AAA Hockey League (QMAAA) from 2012 to 2014. He was a late round draft pick to the Drummondville Voltigeurs (102nd overall) in the 2013 Quebec Major Junior Hockey League (QMJHL) entry draft. Developing early as an offensive under-sized forward, Barré-Boulet lead the Voltigeurs with 54 assists, placing second in team scoring with 89 points in just his second QMJHL season in 2015–16.

During his third season in the QMJHL in 2016–17, Barré-Boulet was traded by the Voltigeurs to the Blainville-Boisbriand Armada in exchange for two players and three draft selections. In scoring at a greater than point-per-game pace with the Armada, Barré-Boulet recorded 14 goals to lead the league in that year's playoffs.

Originally undrafted into the National Hockey League (NHL), Barré-Boulet secured a three-year, entry-level contract with the Tampa Bay Lightning on March 1, 2018. He finished the 2017–18 QMJHL season recording a league-leading 53 goals and 63 assists for 116 points in 65 games to claim the Jean Béliveau Trophy as well as the Michel Brière Memorial Trophy as league MVP. Barré-Boulet would help the Armada advance to the President's Cup Finals that spring, ultimately falling short against the Acadie–Bathurst Titan in six games.

=== Professional ===
Having ended his major junior career, Barré-Boulet attended both the Tampa Bay Lightning's rookie and main training camps, before he was reassigned to American Hockey League (AHL) affiliate the Syracuse Crunch to begin the 2018–19 season. He scored the game-winning goal in his professional debut on October 6 and went on to be the top-scoring rookie in the AHL during the regular season with 68 points in 74 games for the Crunch, placing sixth in the league's overall scoring race. Barré-Boulet also earned a share of the Willie Marshall Award as the league co-leader with 34 goals, alongside teammate Carter Verhaeghe. He likewise won the Dudley "Red" Garrett Memorial Award as most outstanding rookie.

During the 2019–20 season, Barré-Boulet exploded offensively, putting up 40 points in 43 games before the annual All-Star break. He recorded his professional hat-trick on February 28, 2020, against the Wilkes-Barre/Scranton Penguins.

Barré-Boulet was one of the eight players called up to the Lightning for their training camp prior to the 2020 Stanley Cup playoffs.

On February 22, 2021, Barré-Boulet skated in his first career NHL game in a 4–2 Lightning win over the Carolina Hurricanes at PNC Arena. On April 25, he recorded his first career NHL goal and point in a 4–3 Lightning overtime win over the visiting Columbus Blue Jackets at Amalie Arena. Barré-Boulet subsequently signed a three-year contract exentension to remain with the Lightning in July 2021.

On October 10, 2021, he was placed on waivers by the Tampa Bay Lightning, and was claimed by the Seattle Kraken the next day. He played two games for Seattle recording an assist before, on October 21, he was placed on waivers by the Kraken, and was reclaimed by the Lightning the next day.

As an unrestricted free agent following the 2023–24 NHL season, Barré-Boulet signed a one-year contract with the Montreal Canadiens on July 1, 2024. After beginning the 2024–25 NHL season with the Canadiens, Barré-Boulet was placed on waivers and, after going unclaimed, assigned to Montreal's AHL affiliate the Laval Rocket in mid-October.

Entering the ensuing off-season again as an unrestricted free agent, Barré-Boulet agreed to a one-year contract with the Colorado Avalanche on July 4, 2025. After beginning the 2025–26 season assigned to the Avalanche's AHL affiliate, the Colorado Eagles, he emerged as an offensive leader with the latter, finishing second in league scoring with 26 goals and 44 assists for 70 points through 70 games played. In a brief recall to the NHL, Barré-Boulet made his Avalanche debut on January 19, 2026, recording an assist in a 5–2 win against the Washington Capitals.

On July 1, 2026, Barré-Boulet was signed as a free agent to a two-year, two-way contract by the San Jose Sharks.

== Personal life ==
Barré-Boulet met his wife, fellow Québécois Anne-Marie Labrecque, while playing for the QMJHL's Blainville-Boisbriand Armada in 2017. The couple welcomed their first child, a son named Zack, in February 2022, followed by a daughter, Anna, a year later.

== Career statistics ==
			Regular season					Playoffs
Season	Team	League	GP	G	A	Pts	PIM	GP	G	A	Pts	PIM
2012–13	Lévis Commandeurs	QMAAA	11	1	2	3	4	4	2	1	3	2
2013–14	Lévis Commandeurs	QMAAA	32	21	19	40	6	6	2	7	9	8
2014–15	Drummondville Voltigeurs	QMJHL	68	23	28	51	24	—	—	—	—	—
2015–16	Drummondville Voltigeurs	QMJHL	65	35	54	89	42	4	1	1	2	8
2016–17	Drummondville Voltigeurs	QMJHL	37	17	31	48	26	—	—	—	—	—
2016–17	Blainville-Boisbriand Armada	QMJHL	28	12	21	33	16	20	14	17	31	10
2017–18	Blainville-Boisbriand Armada	QMJHL	65	53	63	116	67	19	13	14	27	14
2018–19	Syracuse Crunch	AHL	74	34	34	68	18	4	1	2	3	0
2019–20	Syracuse Crunch	AHL	60	27	29	56	22	—	—	—	—	—
2020–21	Syracuse Crunch	AHL	10	8	4	12	0	—	—	—	—	—
2020–21	Tampa Bay Lightning	NHL	15	3	0	3	0	—	—	—	—	—
2021–22	Seattle Kraken	NHL	2	0	1	1	0	—	—	—	—	—
2021–22	Tampa Bay Lightning	NHL	14	3	2	5	4	—	—	—	—	—
2021–22	Syracuse Crunch	AHL	58	16	47	63	32	5	0	3	3	2
2022–23	Tampa Bay Lightning	NHL	1	0	0	0	0	—	—	—	—	—
2022–23	Syracuse Crunch	AHL	69	24	60	84	58	5	1	8	9	2
2023–24	Tampa Bay Lightning	NHL	36	6	3	9	10	—	—	—	—	—
2023–24	Syracuse Crunch	AHL	23	4	15	19	6	8	4	3	7	0
2024–25	Laval Rocket	AHL	64	22	41	63	42	13	3	8	11	16
2024–25	Montreal Canadiens	NHL	2	0	0	0	2	—	—	—	—	—
2025–26	Colorado Eagles	AHL	70	26	44	70	30	17	5	7	12	4
2025–26	Colorado Avalanche	NHL	2	0	1	1	0	—	—	—	—	—
NHL totals			72	12	7	19	16	—	—	—	—	—

== Awards and honours ==
Award	Year	Ref
CHL
CHL Canada/Russia Series	2016	
CHL Player of the Year	2018	
QMJHL
First All-Star Team	2018	
Jean Béliveau Trophy	2018	
Michel Brière Memorial Trophy	2018	
AHL
All-Rookie Team	2019	
Dudley "Red" Garrett Memorial Award	2019	
Willie Marshall Award	2019	
All-Star Game	2020, 2023	
Second All-Star Team	2020	
First All-Star Team	2023, 2026	
