= Filip Zadina =

Czech ice hockey player (born 1999)

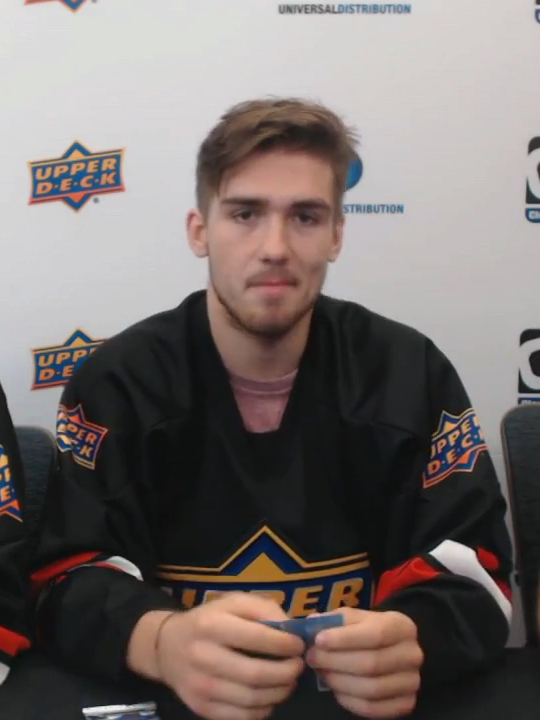
- Zadina in 2018
- Born: 27 November 1999 (age 26) Pardubice, Czech Republic
- Height: 6 ft 0 in (183 cm)
- Weight: 190 lb (86 kg; 13 st 8 lb)
- Position: Right wing
- Shoots: Left
- NHL team Former teams: HC Davos; HC Dynamo Pardubice; Detroit Red Wings; HC Oceláři Třinec; San Jose Sharks
- National team: Czech Republic
- NHL draft: 6th overall, 2018; Detroit Red Wings
- Playing career: 2015–present

Filip Zadina (Czech pronunciation: [ˈfɪlɪb ˈzaɟɪna]; born 27 November 1999) is a Czech professional ice hockey player for HC Davos in the National League (NL). Zadina was drafted sixth overall by the Detroit Red Wings in the 2018 NHL entry draft.

== Playing career ==
Zadina made his Czech Extraliga debut playing with HC Dynamo Pardubice during the 2015–16 Czech Extraliga season.

Zadina was selected 10th overall by the Halifax Mooseheads in the 2017 CHL Import Draft. He committed to the Mooseheads believing they would help him achieve his dream of playing in the NHL. He led all rookies in points, was named to the First All-Star Team, the All-Rookie Team, and won the Michael Bossy Trophy as the best professional prospect in the league.

Before the draft, Zadina was considered a top prospect, with NHL Central Scouting Bureau describing him as a natural scorer with a great finishing touch. He was the third ranked North American based skater, before he was selected sixth overall in the 2018 NHL entry draft by the Detroit Red Wings on 22 June 2018. He soon agreed to a three-year, entry-level contract with the Red Wings on 7 July 2018. After attending Red Wings training camp before the 2018–19 season, Zadina was reassigned to the Grand Rapids Griffins in the American Hockey League on 30 September. On 16 February 2019, in a game against the San Antonio Rampage, Zadina scored eight seconds into overtime, setting the Griffins franchise record for fastest overtime goal.

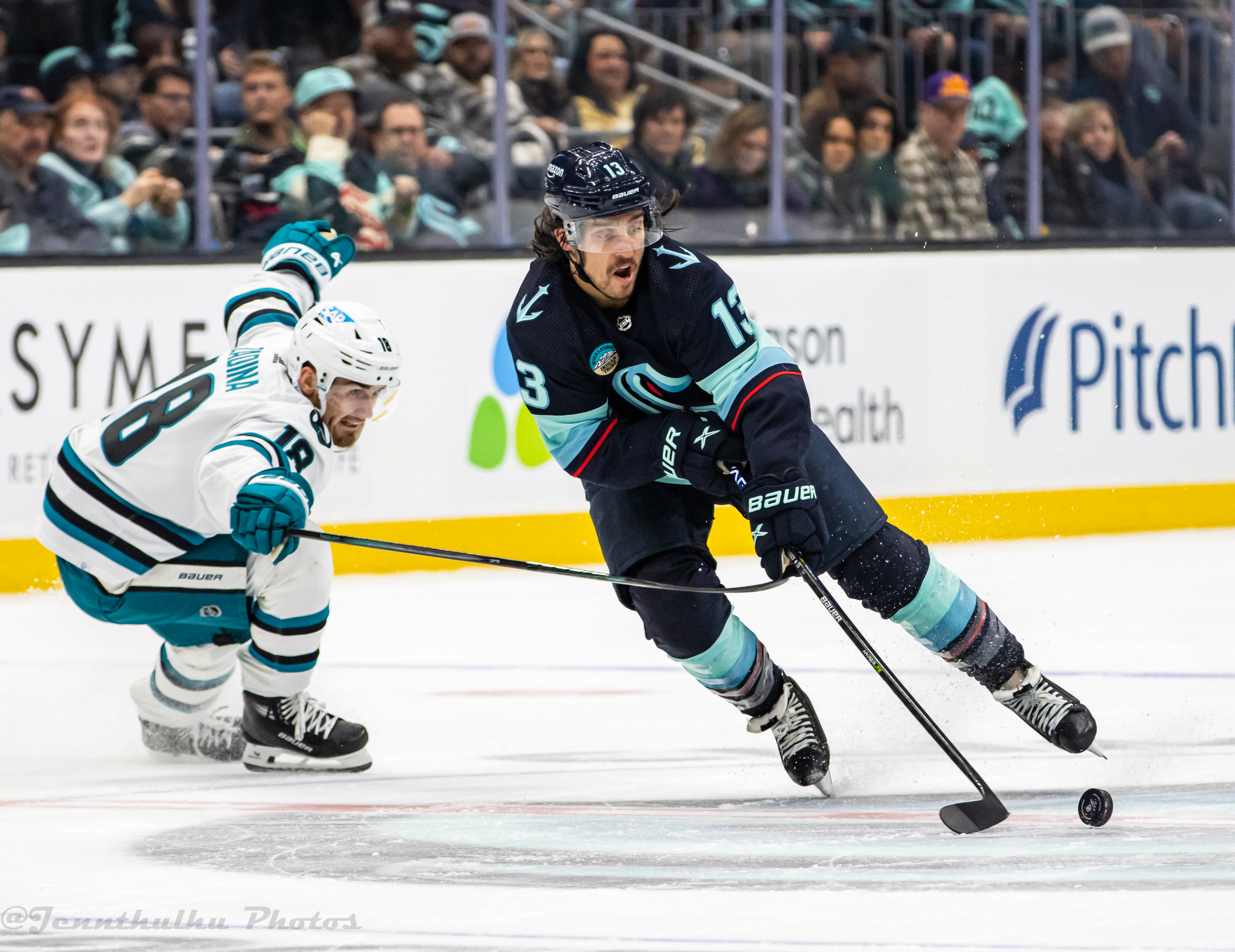
Zadina (left) with the San Jose Sharks and Brandon Tanev of the Seattle Kraken in 2023.

On 23 February 2019, Zadina was recalled by the Red Wings. Before being recalled, he recorded 15 goals and 16 assists in 45 games with the Griffins, ranking third on the team in goals and fourth in points. He made his NHL debut for the Red Wings the next day in a game against the San Jose Sharks. On 5 March, he scored his first career NHL goal in his fourth NHL game, against Semyon Varlamov of the Colorado Avalanche. On 15 March, Zadina was assigned to the Griffins. He recorded one goal and two assists in nine games with the Red Wings, and averaged 15:23 of ice time. On 24 November 2019, Zadina was again recalled by the Red Wings. On 11 December 2019, Zadina was reassigned to the Grand Rapids Griffins (AHL).

On 7 August 2020, with the 2020–21 NHL season delayed due to the COVID-19 pandemic, Zadina, having trained in the off-season with HC Oceláři Třinec, was loaned by the Red Wings to join the Czech ELH club for the beginning of their season until the resumption of the Red Wings training camp in November. He signed a three-year, $5.475 million contract extension with the Red Wings on 26 August, 2022.

Following the 2022–23 season, which saw Zadina miss time due to injury, Zadina requested a trade away from the Red Wings. While the team attempted to trade Zadina, his underperformance and hefty contract relative to his play resulted in no trade interest from other clubs. After failing to find a trade partner, Zadina was placed on waivers on 3 July 2023, allowing any team to claim him; he passed through waivers unclaimed. On 6 July 2023, Zadina agreed to a termination of the remaining two years of his contract with the Red Wings to forgo his remaining salary and become an unrestricted free agent, in a "bet on himself" move. Zadina subsequently became an unrestricted free agent and was signed to a one-year, $1.1 million contract with the San Jose Sharks on 10 July 2023. At the end of the season, the Sharks did not give Zadina a qualifying offer, making him an unrestricted free agent again.

On 2 September 2024, with the Sharks and other NHL teams showing little interest, Zadina signed as a free agent to a two-year contract with Swiss club HC Davos. In July 2025, he signed an early two-year extension with Davos, lasting until the end of the 2027–28 season.

== Personal life ==
Filip is the son of Marek Zadina, a retired professional ice hockey player who is currently an assistant coach for HC Oceláři Třinec of the Czech Extraliga.

== Career statistics ==
=== Regular season and playoffs ===
			Regular season					Playoffs
Season	Team	League	GP	G	A	Pts	PIM	GP	G	A	Pts	PIM
2014–15	HC Pardubice	Czech.20	6	4	2	6	2	—	—	—	—	—
2015–16	HC Pardubice	Czech.20	19	10	7	17	8	—	—	—	—	—
2015–16	HC Pardubice	ELH	2	0	0	0	0	—	—	—	—	—
2016–17	HC Pardubice	Czech.20	20	9	9	18	18	—	—	—	—	—
2016–17	HC Pardubice	ELH	25	1	1	2	4	—	—	—	—	—
2017–18	Halifax Mooseheads	QMJHL	57	44	38	82	36	9	5	7	12	0
2018–19	Grand Rapids Griffins	AHL	59	16	19	35	18	5	2	1	3	0
2018–19	Detroit Red Wings	NHL	9	1	2	3	0	—	—	—	—	—
2019–20	Grand Rapids Griffins	AHL	21	9	7	16	8	—	—	—	—	—
2019–20	Detroit Red Wings	NHL	28	8	7	15	2	—	—	—	—	—
2020–21	HC Oceláři Třinec	ELH	17	8	6	14	18	—	—	—	—	—
2020–21	Detroit Red Wings	NHL	49	6	13	19	0	—	—	—	—	—
2021–22	Detroit Red Wings	NHL	74	10	14	24	10	—	—	—	—	—
2022–23	Detroit Red Wings	NHL	30	3	4	7	10	—	—	—	—	—
2022–23	Grand Rapids Griffins	AHL	2	1	0	1	0	—	—	—	—	—
2023–24	San Jose Sharks	NHL	72	13	10	23	18	—	—	—	—	—
2024–25	HC Davos	NL	43	21	13	34	66	10	6	3	9	10
2025–26	HC Davos	NL	42	21	20	41	74	15	4	6	10	14
ELH totals			44	9	7	16	22	—	—	—	—	—
NHL totals			262	41	50	91	40	—	—	—	—	—
NL totals			85	42	33	75	140	25	10	9	19	24

=== International ===
Year	Team	Event	Result	GP	G	A	Pts	PIM
2015	Czech Republic	U17	7th	5	1	3	4	0
2016	Czech Republic	U18	7th	5	4	1	5	2
2016	Czech Republic	IH18	1st place, gold medalist(s)	4	5	2	7	0
2017	Czech Republic	U18	7th	5	3	3	6	0
2018	Czech Republic	WJC	4th	7	7	1	8	2
2019	Czech Republic	WJC	7th	5	0	1	1	2
2021	Czechia	WC	7th	8	2	2	4	0
2025	Czechia	WC	6th	7	1	3	4	0
Junior totals				31	20	11	31	6
Senior totals				15	3	5	8	0

== Awards and honours ==
Award	Year
QMJHL
All-Rookie Team	2018
Michael Bossy Trophy	2018
First All-Star Team	2018
International
WJC All-Star Team	2018

Awards and achievements
Preceded by Michael Rasmussen	Detroit Red Wings first-round draft pick 2018	Succeeded by Joe Veleno
