= Guhle =

Guhle is a surname. Notable people with the surname include:

- Brendan Guhle (born 1997), Canadian former professional ice hockey defenceman
- Kaiden Guhle (born 2002), Canadian ice hockey defenceman
