= 2019 Memorial Cup =

Canadian junior men's ice hockey championship

Tournament details
- Venue(s): Scotiabank Centre; Halifax, Nova Scotia
- Dates: May 17–26, 2019
- Teams: 4
- Host team: Halifax Mooseheads (QMJHL)
- TV partner(s): Sportsnet, TVA Sports

Final positions
- Champions: Rouyn-Noranda Huskies (QMJHL) (1st title)
- Runners-up: Halifax Mooseheads (QMJHL)

Tournament statistics
- Attendance: 79,099
- Scoring leader: Jakub Lauko (Huskies) (11 points)

Awards
- MVP: Jakub Lauko (Huskies)

The Memorial Cup trophy

The 2019 Memorial Cup (branded as the 2019 Memorial Cup presented by Kia for sponsorship reasons) was a four-team, round-robin format tournament held at the Scotiabank Centre in Halifax, Nova Scotia from May 17–26, 2019. It was the 101st Memorial Cup championship which determine the champion of the Canadian Hockey League (CHL). The tournament was hosted by the Halifax Mooseheads, who won the right to host the tournament over the Moncton Wildcats. The Rouyn-Noranda Huskies defeated the Halifax Mooseheads to win their first Memorial Cup. Mario Pouliot became the first coach to win consecutive Memorial Cups while leading different teams.

== Host bidding process ==
The Quebec Major Junior Hockey League (QMJHL) considered bids from the Halifax Mooseheads and the Moncton Wildcats to host the 2019 Memorial Cup. The Mooseheads had previously hosted the 2000 Memorial Cup, and proposed to host the event at the Scotiabank Centre in Halifax to coincide with the team's 25th anniversary during the 2018–19 QMJHL season. The Wildcats had previously hosted the 2006 Memorial Cup, and proposed to host the event at the Avenir Centre which completed construction in 2018. On April 5, 2018, the QMJHL announced that the Mooseheads were chosen to host the 2019 event.

== Road to the Cup ==
=== OHL playoffs ===
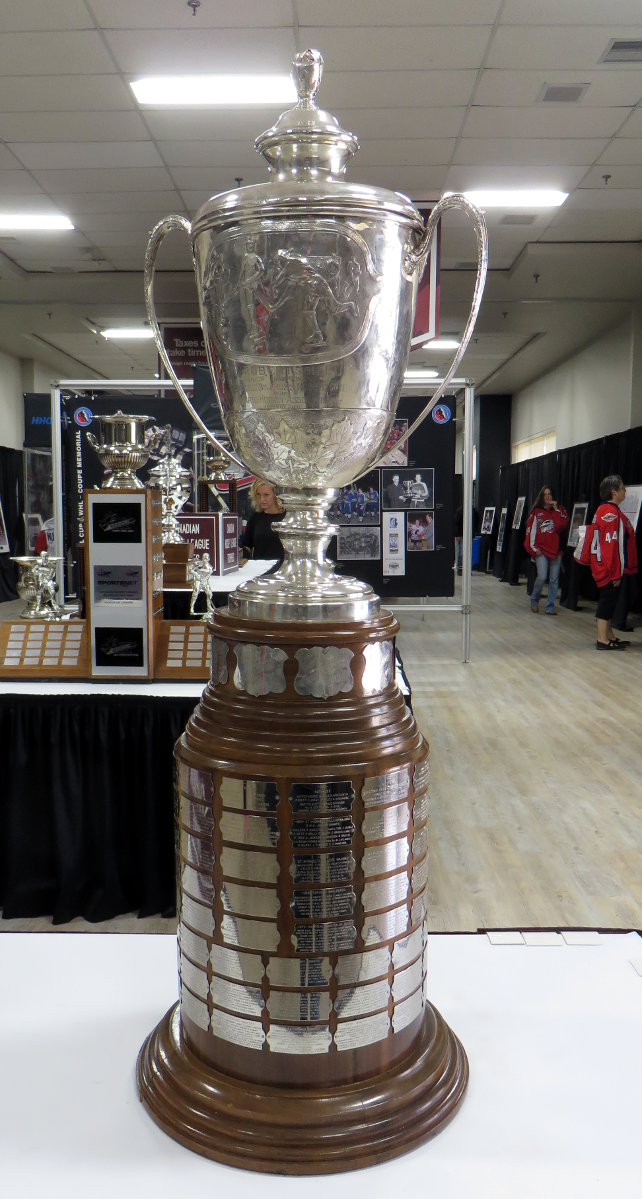
The J. Ross Robertson Cup, championship trophy of the OHL

The Guelph Storm won the J. Ross Robertson Cup as the playoffs champions of the Ontario Hockey League (OHL). The Storm defeated the Kitchener Rangers in four consecutive games in the first round, then lost the next three games to the London Knights before rallying with four consecutive victories to win the second round series in seven games. The Storm lost the first two games in both the third round and the finals, but defeated the Saginaw Spirit in seven games and the Ottawa 67's in six games.

Conference quarterfinals	Conference semifinals
1	Ottawa	4
8	Hamilton	0
1	Ottawa	4
4	Sudbury	0
4	Sudbury	4
5	Mississauga	0
Eastern Conference
2	Niagara	4
7	North Bay	1
2	Niagara	2
3	Oshawa	4
3	Oshawa	4
6	Peterborough	1
1	London	4
8	Windsor	0
1	London	3
4	Guelph	4
4	Guelph	4
5	Kitchener	0
Western Conference
2	Saginaw	4
7	Sarnia	0
2	Saginaw	4
3	Sault Ste. Marie	2
3	Sault Ste. Marie	4
6	Owen Sound	1

Conference finals
1	Ottawa	4
3	Oshawa	0
4	Guelph	4
2	Saginaw	3

Finals
E1	Ottawa	2
W4	Guelph	4

=== QMJHL playoffs ===
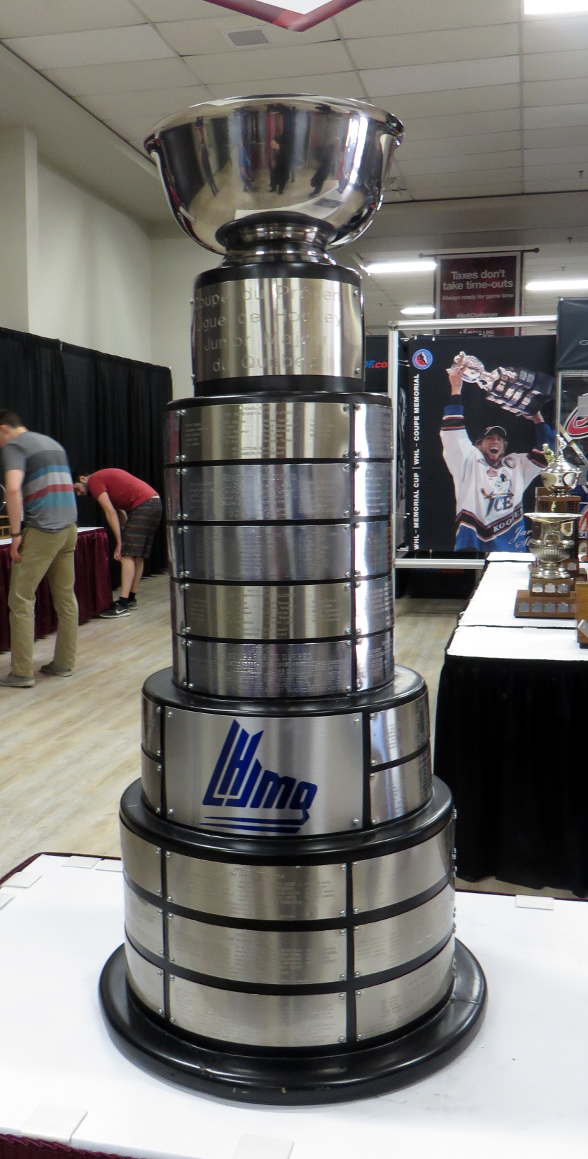
The President's Cup, championship trophy of the QMJHL

The Rouyn-Noranda Huskies were ranked as the top Canadian Hockey League team for four months during the 2018–19 QMJHL season. The Huskies set a QMJHL record with 59 wins during the season, which included a 25-game winning streak. The Huskies won their second President's Cup as the playoffs champions of the QMJHL.

Conference quarterfinals	Conference semifinals
W1	Rouyn-Noranda	4
W8	Shawinigan	2
W1	Rouyn-Noranda	4
W4	Victoriaville	0
W2	Drummondville	4
W7	Gatineau	1
Western Conference
W3	Sherbrooke	4
W6	Blainville-Boisbriand	1
W2	Drummondville	4
W3	Sherbrooke	1
W4	Victoriaville	4
W5	Val-d'Or	3
Note: Pairings are re-seeded after the first and second rounds.
E1	Halifax	4
E8	Quebec	3
E1	Halifax	4
E7	Moncton	0
E2	Baie-Comeau	3
E7	Moncton	4
Eastern Conference
E3	Rimouski	4
E6	Chicoutimi	0
E3	Rimouski	4
E5	Cape Breton	1
E4	Charlottetown	2
E5	Cape Breton	4

Semifinals
1	Rouyn-Noranda	4
4	Rimouski	0
2	Drummondville	2
3	Halifax	4

Finals
1	Rouyn-Noranda	4
3	Halifax	2

=== WHL playoffs ===
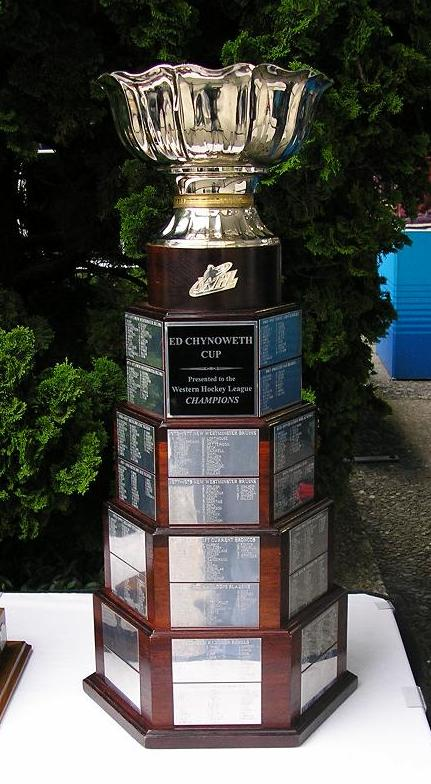
The Ed Chynoweth Cup, championship trophy of the WHL

The Prince Albert Raiders won the Ed Chynoweth Cup as the playoffs champions of the Western Hockey League (WHL). The Raiders won the championship series in overtime in the seventh game versus the Vancouver Giants.

Conference quarterfinals	Conference semifinals
E1	Prince Albert	4
W2	Red Deer	0
E1	Prince Albert	4
E2	Saskatoon	2
E2	Saskatoon	4
E3	Moose Jaw	0
Eastern
C1	Edmonton	4
W1	Medicine Hat	2
C1	Edmonton	4
C3	Calgary	0
C2	Lethbridge	3
C3	Calgary	4
U1	Everett	4
W1	Tri-City	1
U1	Everett	1
U2	Spokane	4
U2	Spokane	4
U3	Portland	1
Western
B1	Vancouver	4
W2	Seattle	2
B1	Vancouver	4
B2	Victoria	0
B2	Victoria	4
B3	Kamloops	2

Conference finals
E1	Prince Albert	4
C1	Edmonton	2
B1	Vancouver	4
U2	Spokane	1

Finals
E1	Prince Albert	4
B1	Vancouver	3

== Event details ==
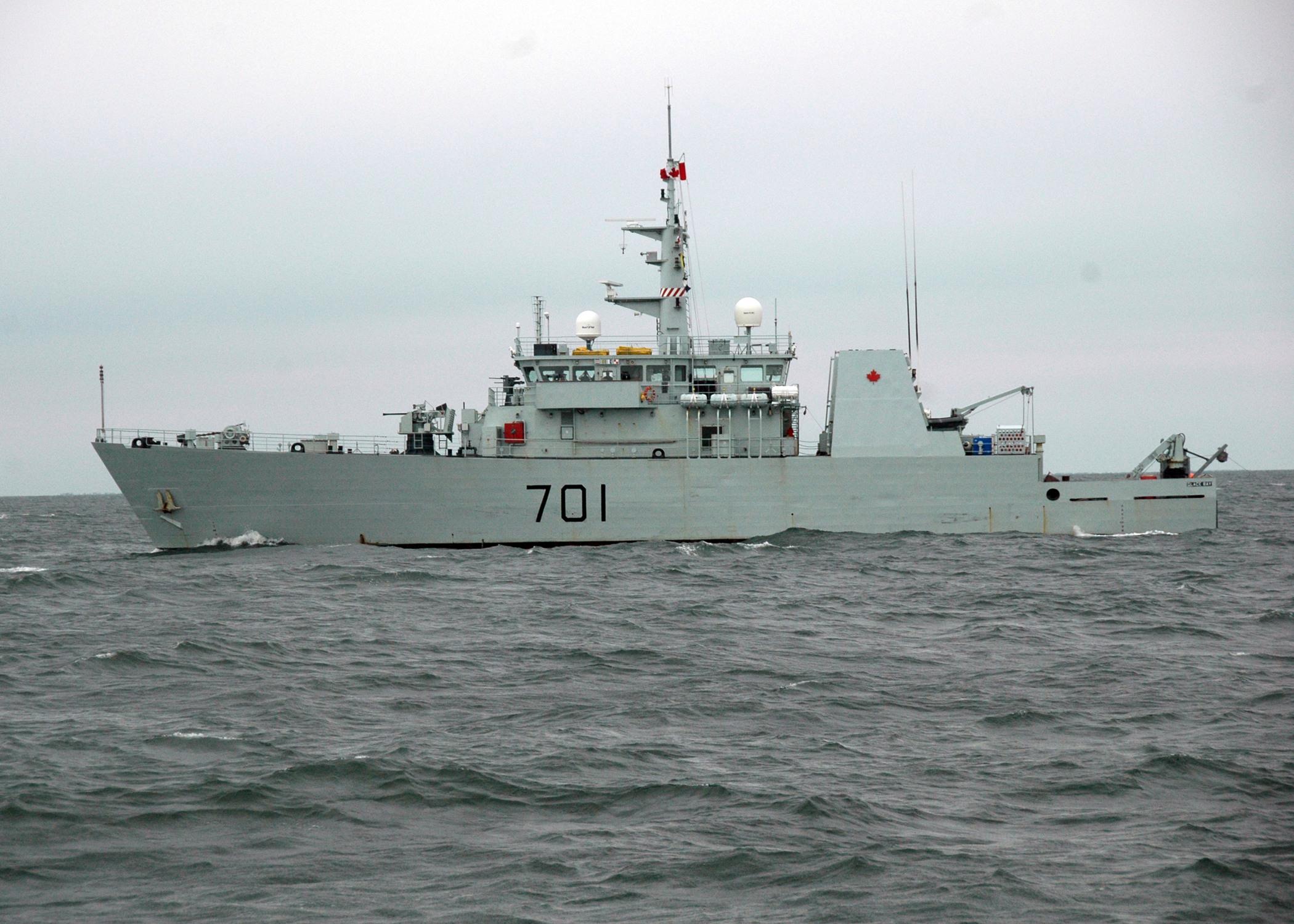
HMCS Glace Bay

As part of a new sponsorship agreement between the CHL and Kia Motors, the South Korean automaker replaced Mastercard as presenting sponsor of the tournament beginning in 2019.

The Memorial Cup trophy arrived in Halifax aboard HMCS Glace Bay, then was accompanied by players from the Halifax Mooseheads in a parade to the Scotiabank Centre.

== Team rosters ==
Rosters as listed on the Memorial Cup web site for each team:

=== Halifax Mooseheads ===
- Head coach: Éric Veilleux

Pos.	No.	Player
G	1	Alexis Gravel
G	29	Cole McLaren
D	2	Denis Toner
D	3	Walter Flower
D	12	Patrick Kyte
D	14	Jared McIsaac
D	16	Jake Ryczek
D	20	Justin Barron
D	79	Jocktan Chainey
F	8	Brock McLeod
F	19	Benoit-Olivier Groulx
F	21	Arnaud Durandeau
F	23	Keith Getson
F	28	Ben Higgins
F	48	Ostap Safin
F	50	Raphaël Lavoie
F	61	Joel Bishop
F	67	Xavier Parent
F	71	Maxim Trépanier
F	72	Samuel Asselin
F	88	Antoine Morand
F	91	Marcel Barinka
F	94	Samuel Dubé

=== Rouyn-Noranda Huskies ===
- Head coach: Mario Pouliot

Pos.	No.	Player
G	1	Samuel Harvey
G	31	Zachary Emond
D	3	Jacob Neveu
D	4	Justin Bergeron
D	6	Samuel Régis
D	7	Alexis Arsenault
D	8	William Cyr
D	27	Ryan MacLellan
D	53	Noah Dobson
F	10	Louis-Filip Côté
F	11	Rafaël Harvey-Pinard
F	12	William Rouleau
F	13	Jakub Lauko
F	14	Mathieu Gagnon
F	15	Vincent Marleau
F	16	Alex Beaucage
F	19	Patrik Hrehorčák
F	20	Tommy Beaudoin
F	21	Félix Bibeau
F	22	Peter Abbandonato
F	23	Samuel Naud
F	24	Joël Teasdale
F	25	Tyler Hinam

=== Guelph Storm ===
- Head coach: George Burnett

Pos.	No.	Player
G	32	Anthony Popovich
G	35	Nico Daws
D	4	Owen Lalonde
D	5	Dmitri Samorukov
D	6	Sean Durzi
D	11	Daniil Chayka
D	22	Jack Hanley
D	23	Zack Terry
D	25	Markus Phillips
D	29	Fedor Gordeev
F	7	Zachary Roberts
F	8	Cam Hillis
F	9	Nick Suzuki
F	10	MacKenzie Entwistle
F	12	Keegan Stevenson
F	13	Alexey Toropchenko
F	14	Cedric Ralph
F	15	Liam Hawel
F	16	Nate Schnarr
F	17	Pavel Gogolev
F	19	Isaac Ratcliffe
F	20	Ben McFarlane
F	21	Ty Collins
F	27	Domenico Commisso

=== Prince Albert Raiders ===
- Head coach: Marc Habscheid

Pos.	No.	Player
G	33	Ian Scott
G	35	Boston Bilous
D	3	Jeremy Masella
D	5	Zack Hayes
D	6	Kaiden Guhle
D	8	Brayden Pachal
D	10	Max Martin
D	12	Sergei Sapego
D	14	Loeden Schaufler
F	11	Spencer Moe
F	15	Brian Harris
F	16	Jakob Brook
F	17	Dante Hannoun
F	18	Noah Gregor
F	19	Ozzy Wiesblatt
F	20	Brett Leason
F	21	Aliaksei Protas
F	23	Eric Pearce
F	24	Cole Fonstad
F	25	Sean Montgomery
F	27	Parker Kelly
F	29	Justin Nachbaur

== Tournament games ==
All times local (UTC −3)

=== Round-robin ===
May 17	Prince Albert Raiders	1–4	Halifax Mooseheads	Scotiabank Centre	Recap
No scoring		First period	10:49 – Samuel Asselin (1); 18:44 – Xavier Parent (1)
Noah Gregor (1) – 10:46		Second period	15:52 – pp – Jake Ryczek (1)
No scoring		Third period	18:07 – en – Antoine Morand (1)
Ian Scott (33 saves / 36 shots)		Goalie stats	Alexis Gravel (23 saves / 24 shots)

May 18	Rouyn-Noranda Huskies	2–5	Guelph Storm	Scotiabank Centre	Recap
Vincent Marleau (1) – 2:17		First period	11:00 – sh – Alexey Toropchenko (1); 13:07 – Alexey Toropchenko (2); 18:23 – Alexey Toropchenko (3)
Jakub Lauko (1) – 11:16		Second period	3:20 – MacKenzie Entwistle (1); 19:15 – Nick Suzuki (1)
No scoring		Third period	No scoring
Samuel Harvey (24 saves / 29 shots)		Goalie stats	Anthony Popovich (22 saves / 24 shots)

May 19	Halifax Mooseheads	4–2	Guelph Storm	Scotiabank Centre	Recap
Antoine Morand (2) – 05:10		First period	19:10 – Sean Durzi (1)
Raphaël Lavoie (1) – sh – 06:48; Maxim Trépanier (1) – 10:34		Second period	No scoring
Samuel Asselin (2) – 07:20		Third period	01:07 – pp – Sean Durzi (2)
Alexis Gravel (33 saves / 35 shots)		Goalie stats	Anthony Popovich (38 saves / 42 shots)

May 20	Rouyn-Noranda Huskies	6–3	Prince Albert Raiders	Scotiabank Centre	Recap
Tyler Hinam (1) – 4:34; Joël Teasdale (1) – pp – 18:32		First period	8:32 – Cole Fonstad (1); 13:47 – Brayden Pachal (1)
Félix Bibeau (1) – 12:59		Second period	17:43 – Noah Gregor (2)
Tyler Hinam (2) – 15:28; Peter Abbandonato (1) – 16:53; Noah Dobson (1) – en – 18:19		Third period	No scoring
Samuel Harvey (30 saves / 33 shots)		Goalie stats	Ian Scott (27 saves / 32 shots)

May 21	Guelph Storm	5–2	Prince Albert Raiders	Scotiabank Centre	Recap
Fedor Gordeev (1) – 9:42; Isaac Ratcliffe (1) – 15:18		First period	11:32 – pp – Sean Montgomery (1); 19:16 – Dante Hannoun (1)
Liam Hawel (1) – pp – 1:21; Nick Suzuki (2) – 5:02		Second period	No scoring
Nick Suzuki (3) – 6:42		Third period	No scoring
Anthony Popovich (19 saves / 21 shots)		Goalie stats	Ian Scott (20 saves / 25 shots)

May 22	Halifax Mooseheads	3–4	Rouyn-Noranda Huskies	Scotiabank Centre	Recap
No scoring		First period	14:38 – Félix Bibeau (2); 15:50 – Joël Teasdale (2)
Benoit-Olivier Groulx (1) – 0:48; Arnaud Durandeau (1) – 7:34; Antoine Morand (3) – pp – 19:17		Second period	No scoring
No scoring		Third period	10:13 – William Rouleau (1); 19:05 – Jakub Lauko (2)
Alexis Gravel (36 saves / 40 shots)		Goalie stats	Samuel Harvey (24 saves / 27 shots)

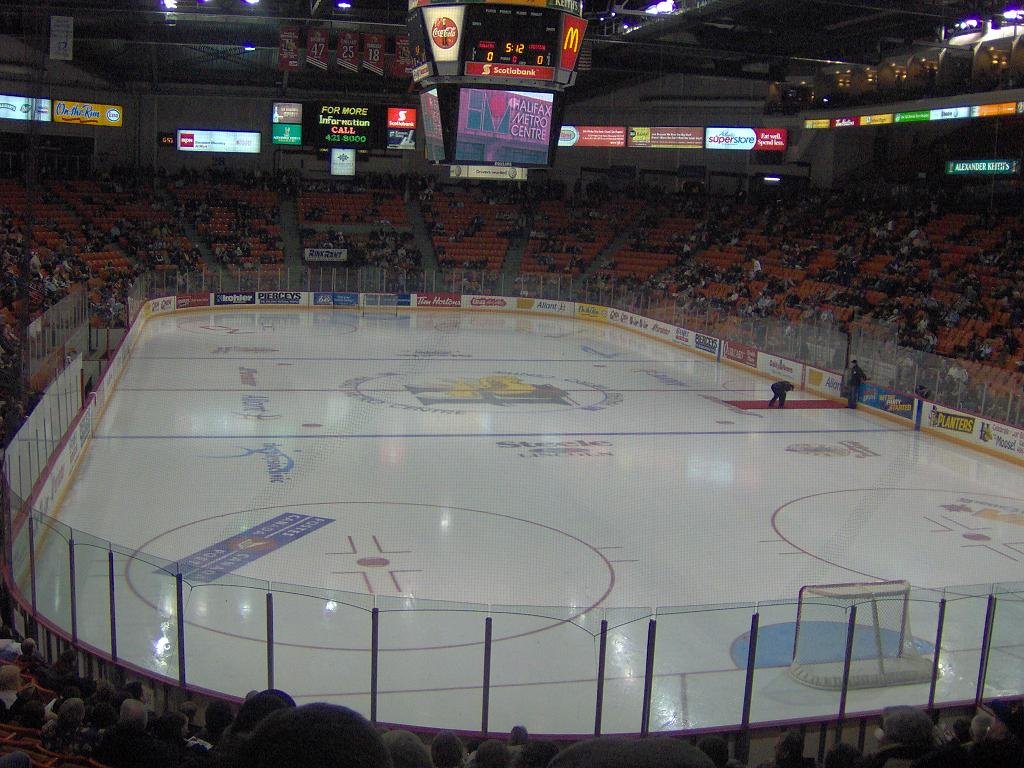
Scotiabank Centre interior during a Mooseheads game

Round-robin standings

Pos	Team	Pld	W	L	GF	GA	Pts	
1	Halifax Mooseheads (QMJHL/host)	3	2	1	11	7	4	Advanced directly to the championship game
2	Guelph Storm (OHL)	3	2	1	12	8	4	Advanced to the semifinal game
2	Rouyn-Noranda Huskies (QMJHL)	3	2	1	12	11	4	Advanced to the semifinal game
4	Prince Albert Raiders (WHL)	3	0	3	6	15	0	

=== Semifinal game ===
May 24	Guelph Storm	4–6	Rouyn-Noranda Huskies	Scotiabank Centre	Recap
Isaac Ratcliffe (2) – 6:28; Jack Hanley (1) – 7:28		First period	4:58 – pp – Alex Beaucage (1); 9:31 – Joël Teasdale (3)
Cedric Ralph (1) – 5:53		Second period	6:49 – Tyler Hinam (3)
Isaac Ratcliffe (3) – 18:47		Third period	5:40 – Félix Bibeau (3); 12:33 – Félix Bibeau (4); 19:57 – en – Rafaël Harvey-Pinard (1)
Anthony Popovich (33 saves / 38 shots)		Goalie stats	Samuel Harvey (34 saves / 38 shots)

=== Championship game ===
May 26	Halifax Mooseheads	2–4	Rouyn-Noranda Huskies	Scotiabank Centre	Recap
Samuel Asselin (3) – pp – 19:16		First period	No scoring
Raphaël Lavoie (2) – 5:26		Second period	10:27 – Félix Bibeau (5); 15:11 – Joël Teasdale (4)
No scoring		Third period	3:02 – Peter Abbandonato (2); 5:03 – Vincent Marleau (2)
Alexis Gravel (31 saves / 35 shots)		Goalie stats	Samuel Harvey (23 saves / 25 shots)

The Huskies won their first Memorial Cup in franchise history with a victory by a 4–2 score versus the Mooseheads, watched by a sold-out crowd with 10,595 fans. The Mooseheads had led the game a 2–0 score in the second period, then the Huskies scored four consecutive goals for the win. Huskies head coach Mario Pouliot became the first person to win consecutive Memorial Cups with two different teams, and third coach overall to win with multiple teams including, Don Hay and Bryan Maxwell.

== Statistical leaders ==
=== Skaters ===
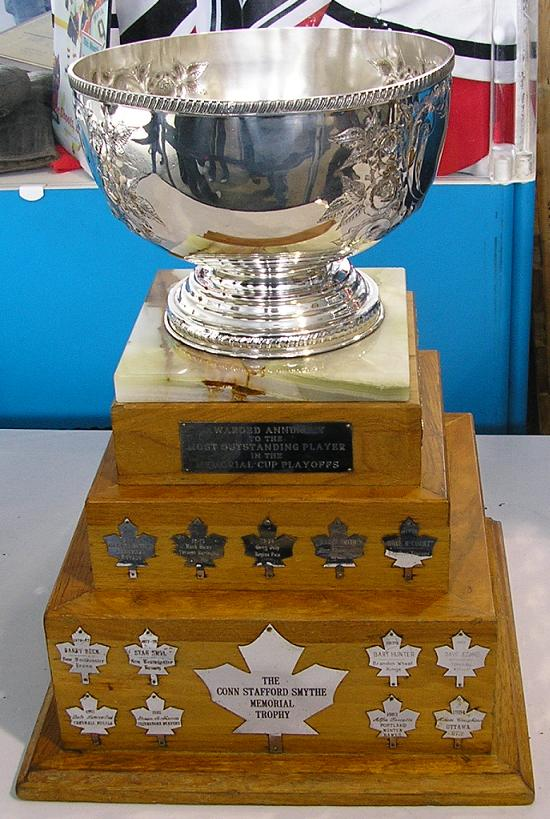
The Stafford Smythe Memorial Trophy, awarded to Jakub Lauko as the most outstanding player in the Memorial Cup playoffs

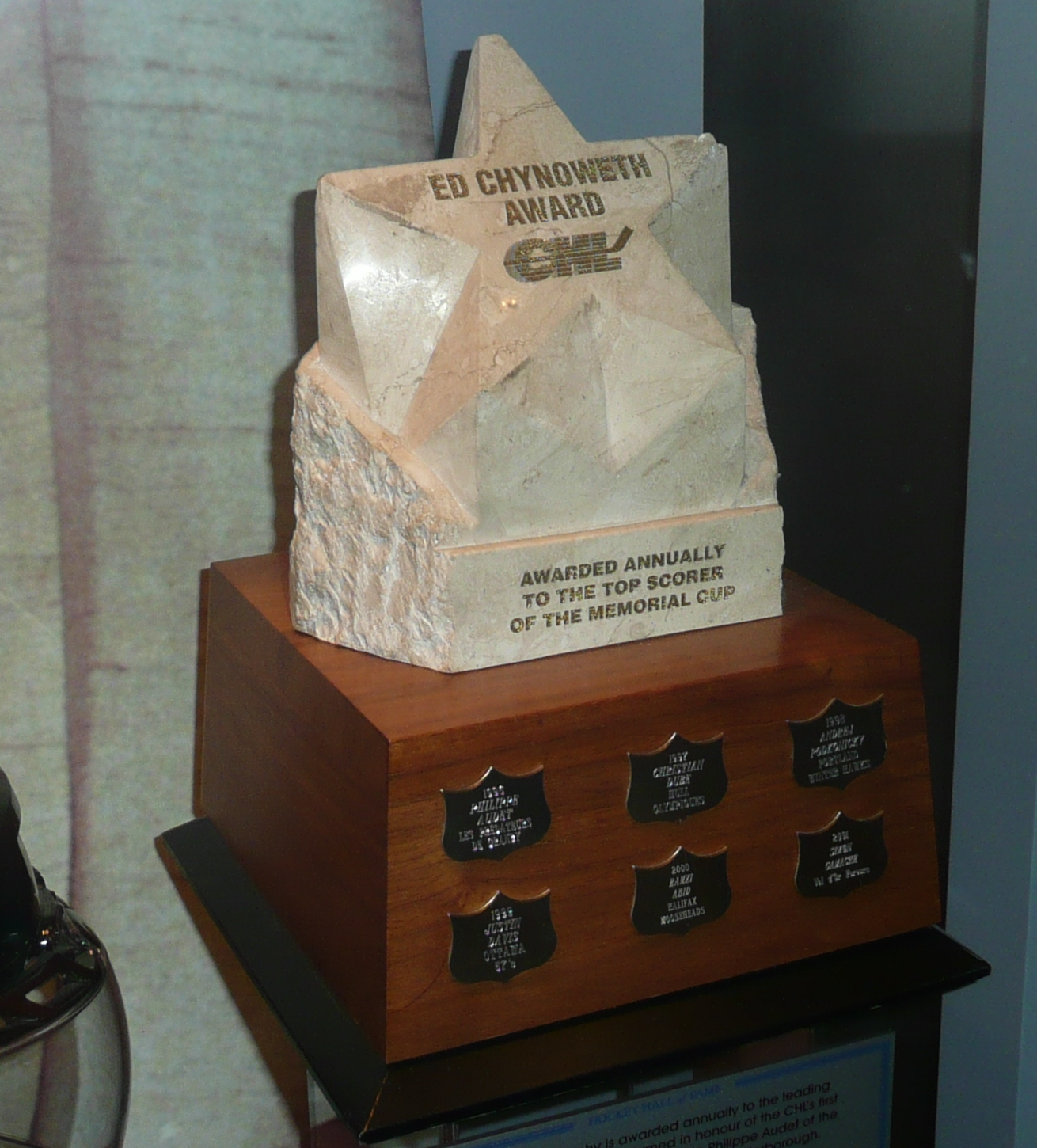
The Ed Chynoweth Trophy, awarded to Jakub Lauko as the top scorer in the Memorial Cup tournament

- GP = Games played; G = Goals; A = Assists; Pts = Points; PIM = Penalty minutes

Player	Team	GP	G	A	Pts	PIM
Jakub Lauko	Rouyn-Noranda Huskies	5	2	6	8	0
Nick Suzuki	Guelph Storm	4	3	4	7	0
Sean Durzi	Guelph Storm	4	2	5	7	2
Félix Bibeau	Rouyn-Noranda Huskies	5	5	1	6	8
Isaac Ratcliffe	Guelph Storm	4	3	3	6	8
Alexey Toropchenko	Guelph Storm	4	3	3	6	0
Maxim Trépanier	Halifax Mooseheads	4	1	5	6	2
Rafaël Harvey-Pinard	Rouyn-Noranda Huskies	5	1	5	6	0
Joël Teasdale	Rouyn-Noranda Huskies	5	4	1	5	6
Samuel Asselin	Halifax Mooseheads	4	3	2	5	2

GP = Games played; G = Goals; A = Assists; Pts = Points; PIM = Penalty minutes

=== Goaltenders ===
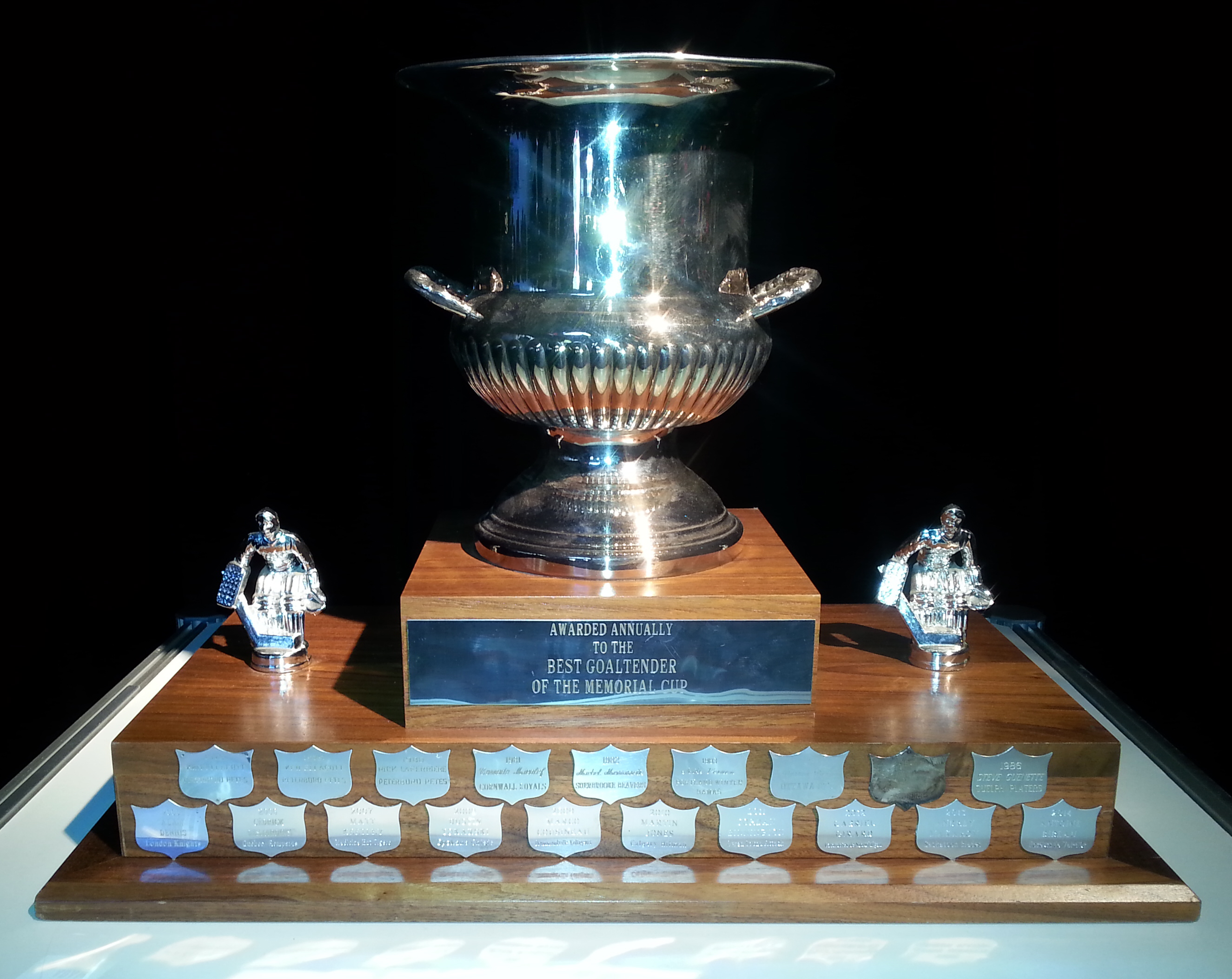
Hap Emms Memorial Trophy, awarded to Alexis Gravel as the best goaltender in the Memorial Cup tournament

- GP = Games played; W = Wins; L = Losses; SA = Shots against; GA = Goals against; GAA = Goals against average; SV% = Save percentage; SO = Shutouts; TOI = Time on ice (minutes)

Player	Team	GP	W	L	OTL	SA	GA	GAA	SV%	SO	TOI
Alexis Gravel	Halifax Mooseheads	4	2	2	0	134	11	2.78	.918	0	237
Anthony Popovich	Guelph Storm	4	2	2	0	125	13	3.28	.896	0	238
Samuel Harvey	Rouyn-Noranda Huskies	5	4	1	0	127	17	3.40	.882	0	300
Ian Scott	Prince Albert Raiders	3	0	3	0	93	13	4.36	.860	0	179

GP = Games played; W = Wins; L = Losses; SA = Shots against; GA = Goals against; GAA = Goals against average; SV% = Save percentage; SO = Shutouts; TOI = Time on ice (minutes:seconds)

== Awards ==
The CHL handed out the following awards at the conclusion of the 2019 Memorial Cup:

- Stafford Smythe Memorial Trophy (Most outstanding player): Joël Teasdale, Rouyn-Noranda Huskies
- Ed Chynoweth Trophy (Top scorer): Jakub Lauko, Rouyn-Noranda Huskies
- George Parsons Trophy (Most sportsmanlike player): Nick Suzuki, Guelph Storm
- Hap Emms Memorial Trophy (Best goaltender): Alexis Gravel, Halifax Mooseheads
- Memorial Cup All-Star Team:

Goaltender: Alexis Gravel, Halifax Mooseheads
Defence: Sean Durzi, Guelph Storm; Noah Dobson, Rouyn-Noranda Huskies
Forwards: Isaac Ratcliffe, Guelph Storm; Félix Bibeau, Rouyn-Noranda Huskies; Benoit-Olivier Groulx, Halifax Mooseheads
