= Noah Gregor =

Canadian ice hockey player (born 1998)

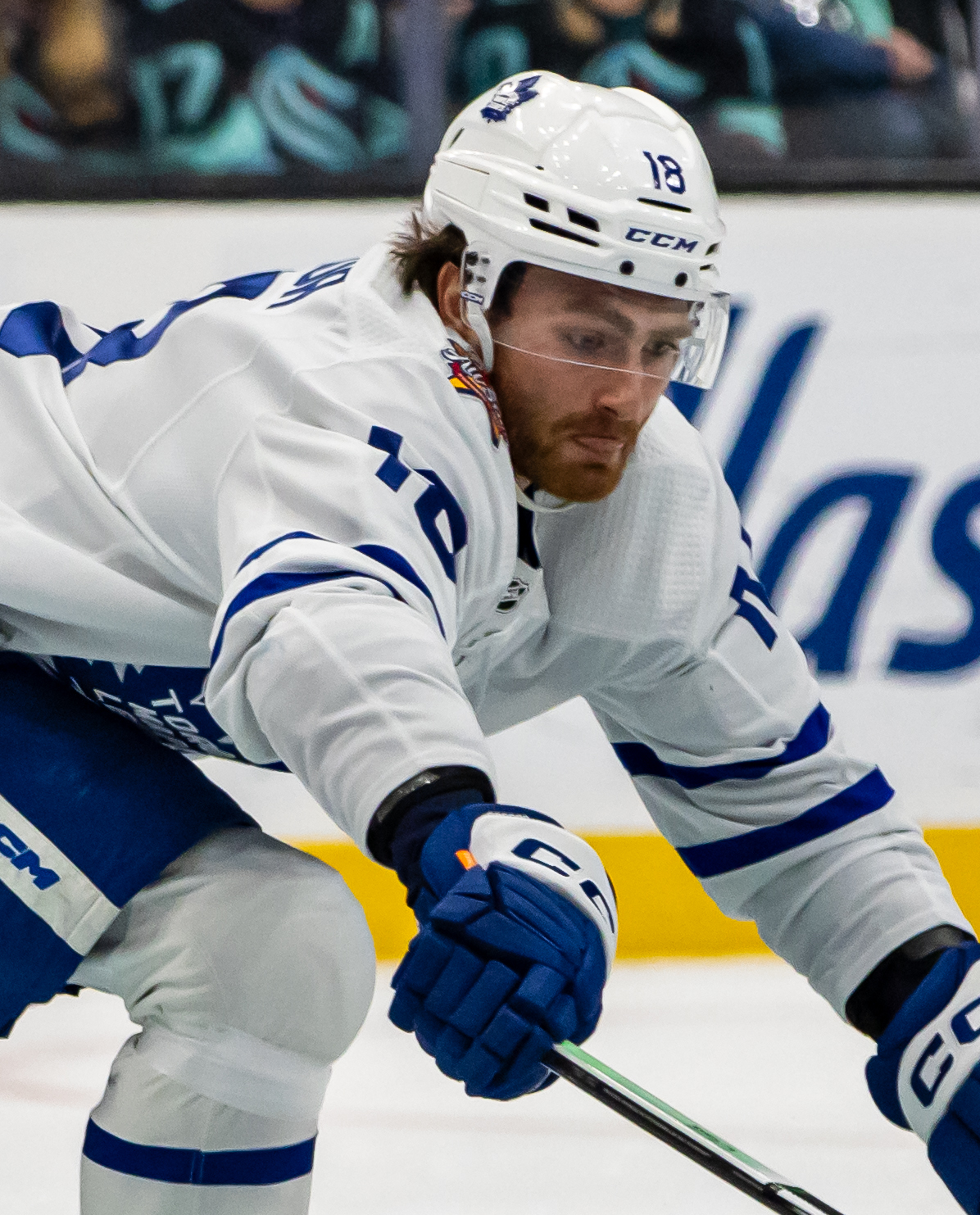
- Gregor with the Toronto Maple Leafs in 2024
- Born: July 28, 1998 (age 28) Beaumont, Alberta, Canada
- Height: 6 ft 0 in (183 cm)
- Weight: 201 lb (91 kg; 14 st 5 lb)
- Position: Centre
- Shoots: Left
- NHL team (P) Cur. team Former teams: Winnipeg Jets; Manitoba Moose (AHL); San Jose Sharks; Toronto Maple Leafs; Ottawa Senators; Florida Panthers
- National team: Canada
- NHL draft: 111th overall, 2016; San Jose Sharks
- Playing career: 2018–present

Noah Gregor (born July 28, 1998) is a Canadian professional ice hockey player who is a centre for the Manitoba Moose of the American Hockey League (AHL) while under contract to the Winnipeg Jets of the National Hockey League (NHL). Having originally played for the San Jose Sharks (who drafted him 111th overall in the fourth round of the 2016 NHL entry draft), he has also played for the Toronto Maple Leafs and Ottawa Senators, and Florida Panthers.

== Early life ==
Gregor was born on July 28, 1998, in Beaumont, Alberta to parents Colin and Elise. He was born into a hockey-involved family as his father played four seasons in the Western Hockey League (WHL) while his uncle Jason was a radio host for The Sports Network until TSN 1260 was shut down in June 2023. Likewise, his brother Liam played hockey with the Beaumont Chiefs and Spruce Grove Saints.

== Playing career ==
=== Amateur ===
Growing up, Gregor played in the Beaumont Minor Hockey Association and Alberta Midget Hockey League (AMHL). While playing for the Leduc Oil Kings Bantam in the 2013–14 season, Gregor led the AMHL with 21 goals and 30 points through 35 games. Gregor was selected in the third round, 55th overall, by the Victoria Royals in the 2013 WHL bantam draft, the same city that his father played in.

Gregor returned to the Oil Kings for the 2013–14 season. On January 6, 2014, the Royals traded Gregor's rights to the Moose Jaw Warriors in exchange for Travis Brown. He began the 2014–15 season with the Warriors, recording six points through eight games before breaking his collarbone. He managed to return for two more games in late December, but reaggravated the injury and missed the remainder of the season. During the 2015–16 season, Gregor was selected to represent Team Cherry in the CHL/NHL Top Prospects Game. He finished the season with 28 goals and 73 points to earn the team's Most Sportsmanlike Player and Rookie of the Year Award. Gregor also accepted the Eastern Conference Rookie of the Year Award.

Gregor rejoined the Warriors for the 2016–17 season. Prior to the season beginning, he was named an alternate captain alongside Tanner Jeannot and Josh Thrower. On December 11, Gregor – alongside a 2018 eighth round pick – was traded back to the Royals in exchange for Ryan Peckford and a 2018 fourth round pick. He finished the season with 65 points in 60 games split between the two clubs.

On July 25, 2018, the Royals traded Gregor to the Prince Albert Raiders. He recorded 88 points in 63 games for the club during the 2018–19 season. The Raiders were awarded the Ed Chynoweth Cup as league champions after defeating the Vancouver Giants in seven games. Gregor recorded 24 points in 23 postseason games. The Raiders, however, were unsuccessful in winning the Memorial Cup.

=== Professional ===
==== San Jose Sharks (2019–2023) ====
Gregor was selected in the fourth round, 111th overall, by the San Jose Sharks of the National Hockey League (NHL) in the 2016 NHL entry draft. On April 6, 2018, the Sharks signed Gregor to a three-year, entry-level contract. He subsequently joined the team's American Hockey League (AHL) affiliate, the San Jose Barracuda, skating in one postseason game. After spending one more year with his junior team, he joined the Sharks organization full time ahead of the 2019–20 season. He was assigned to the Barracuda to start the season but was recalled on October 19, 2019. Gregor played in his first career NHL game that night, a 4–3 loss against the Buffalo Sabres. On November 29, Gregor scored his first career NHL goal in a 4–1 win against the Los Angeles Kings. He remained with the team until November 17, when he was sent back to the AHL, and shuttled between the Sharks and Barracuda for the rest of November and December. He was recalled a final time on February 13, 2020 and remained with the Sharks until the season was cancelled on March 12 on account of the COVID-19 pandemic. In 25 games with the Barracuda, Gregor recorded seven goals and 19 points and in 28 games with the Sharks, three goals and five points.

Going into the pandemic-shortened 2020–21 season, Gregor began with the Sharks' taxi squad. He played regularly with the Sharks the fourth line alongside Patrick Marleau and Rūdolfs Balcers until March 9, 2021, when he was assigned to the Barracuda. He was recalled in April. In ten games with the Barracuda he had three goals and ten points. In 30 games with the Sharks, five goals and six points. On September 13, the Sharks re-signed Gregor to a one-year, $750,000 contract extension. He began the 2021–22 season with the Barracuda, but was recalled on November 21 and made his season debut in a 4–0 loss to the Washington Capitals. In eight games in the AHL, he had four goals and 12 points. He spent the remainder of the season with the Sharks, recording eight goals and 23 points in 63 games. On August 22, 2022, Gregor signed a one-year, $950,000 contract extension with the Sharks. On April 1, 2023, Gregor recorded his first career hat-trick in a 7–2 win over the Arizona Coyotes. He finished the 2022–23 season with ten goals and 17 points in 57 games. Gregor was not tendered a qualifying offer by the Sharks following the conclusion of the season, making him an unrestricted free agent.

==== Toronto Maple Leafs (2023–2024) ====
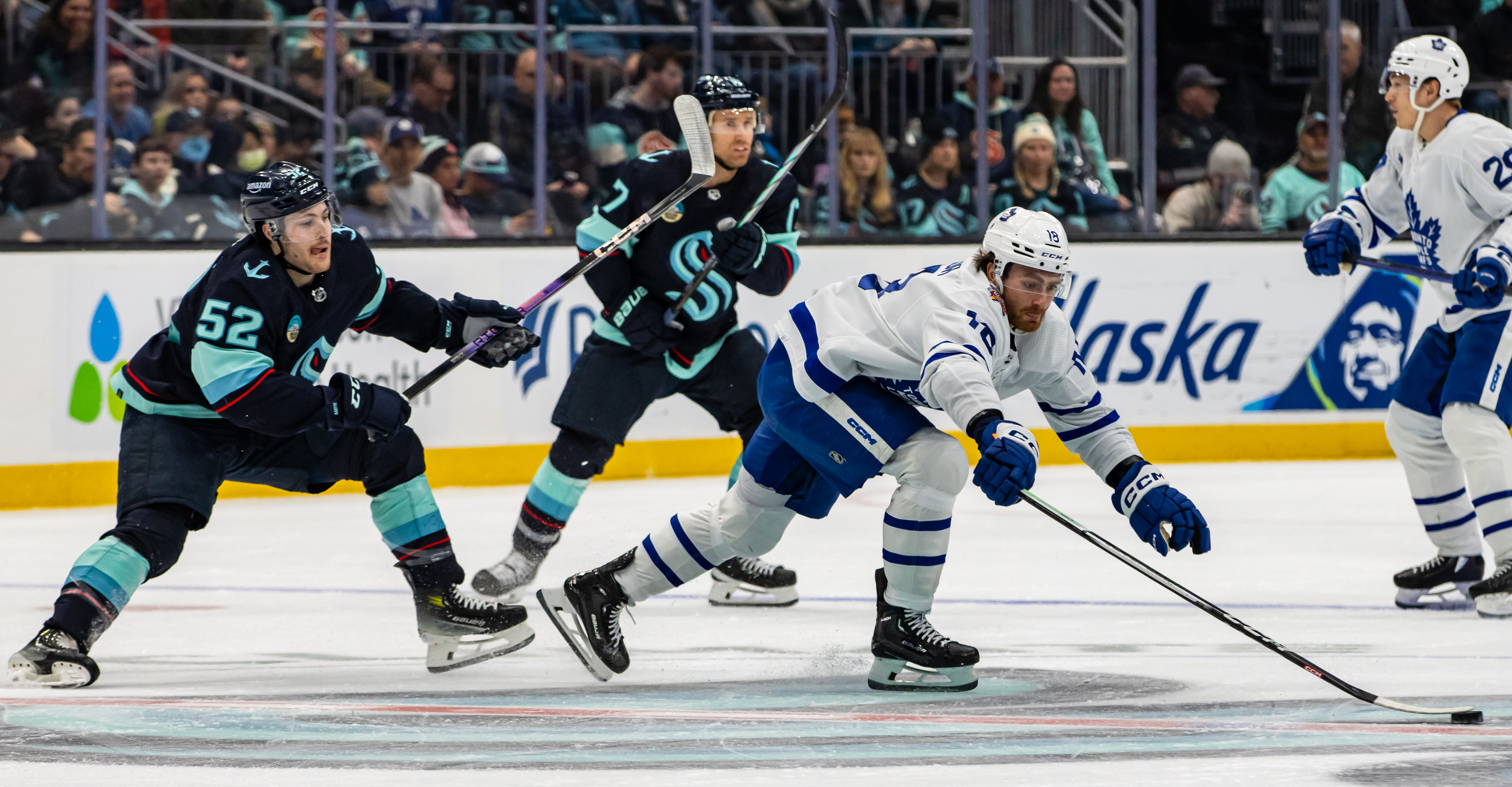
Gregor reaching for the puck in a game against the Seattle Kraken in 2024

On September 6, 2023, Gregor agreed to a professional tryout offer with the Toronto Maple Leafs to attend their training camp. On October 10, the Maple Leafs signed Gregor to a one-year, $775,000 contract. In his first game for the team on October 11, Gregor scored the Maple Leafs' first goal of the season in an eventual 6–5 win over the Montreal Canadiens. On March 24, 2024, Gregor suffered a high stick to the face by Capitals forward Tom Wilson. He suffered no injuries aside from multiple chipped teeth. Wilson was suspended six games for the action. He appeared in 63 games with the Maple Leafs, scoring six goals and 12 points. He made his Stanley Cup playoffs debut in game six of the Maple Leafs' first round series against the Boston Bruins. He also appeared in game seven as the Maple Leafs were eliminated by the Bruins. A restricted free agent at season's end, Toronto did not tender him a qualifying offer, making him an unrestricted free agent.

==== Ottawa Senators (2024–2025) ====
On July 1, 2024, Gregor signed a one-year, $850,000 contract with the Ottawa Senators. He made the team out of training camp and established himself on the team's fourth line alongside Adam Gaudette and Nick Cousins. He scored his first goal with the Senators shorthanded against Andrei Vasilevskiy in a 5–4 victory over the Tampa Bay Lightning on October 19. He appeared in 40 games with Ottawa, recording four goals and six points.

==== Return to San Jose (2025) ====
On March 7, 2025, Gregor was traded in a return to the San Jose Sharks alongside Zack Ostapchuk and a second-round pick in the 2025 NHL entry draft in exchange for Fabian Zetterlund, Tristen Robins and a fourth-round pick in 2025. He made his season debut for the Sharks on March 13 in a game against the Chicago Blackhawks. He recorded his first point in his second tenure with San Jose on April 13, assisting on Tyler Toffoli's first period goal in a 5–2 loss to the Calgary Flames. He finished the season appearing in 12 games with San Jose, notching just the one point.

==== Florida Panthers (2025–2026) ====
In September 2025, Gregor signed a professional tryout agreement with the Florida Panthers. Several weeks later, on October 7, Gregor signed a one-year contract with the team. He played his first game with the club on October 28 in an overtime loss to the Anaheim Ducks. He registered his first point, an assist on Luke Kunin's second period goal in a 8–5 victory over the Vancouver Canucks on November 17. His first goal with the Panthers came on December 11 in a 6–2 loss to the Colorado Avalanche. On January 9, 2026, Gregor was placed on waivers by Florida. After going unclaimed, Gregor was assigned to the Panthers' AHL affiliate, the Charlotte Checkers, making 26 appearances, scoring 11 goals and 17 points. He was recalled on March 24, and recorded a goal and assist in a 5–4 win over the Seattle Kraken that night. In 37 games with Florida, he scored four goals and eight points. With the Panthers eliminated from the postseason, they sent Gregor back to the Checkers for the 2026 Calder Cup playoffs. In three AHL playoff games, he scored two goals as the Checkers bowed out in the first round to the Springfield Thunderbirds.

==== Winnipeg Jets (2026–present) ====
On July 1, 2026, Gregor signed a one-year, two-way contract with the Winnipeg Jets. During training camp, he was placed on waivers and after going unclaimed, assigned to Winnipeg's AHL affiliate, the Manitoba Moose.

== International play ==
Medal record

Representing Canada

Ice hockey

World Championship
Silver medal – second place	2022 Finland	

Gregor represented Team Canada's under-18 team at the 2016 IIHF World U18 Championships. He registered two assists in five games, but Canada finished fourth in the tournament. Gregor was invited to Team Canada for the 2022 IIHF World Championship, where the team won the silver medal.

== Career statistics ==
=== Regular season and playoffs ===
			Regular season					Playoffs
Season	Team	League	GP	G	A	Pts	PIM	GP	G	A	Pts	PIM
2014–15	Moose Jaw Warriors	WHL	10	2	4	6	0	—	—	—	—	—
2015–16	Moose Jaw Warriors	WHL	72	28	45	73	33	10	3	6	9	4
2016–17	Moose Jaw Warriors	WHL	52	27	34	61	29	7	2	0	2	0
2017–18	Moose Jaw Warriors	WHL	30	14	22	36	27	—	—	—	—	—
2017–18	Victoria Royals	WHL	30	15	14	29	29	11	6	6	12	8
2017–18	San Jose Barracuda	AHL	—	—	—	—	—	1	0	0	0	0
2018–19	Prince Albert Raiders	WHL	63	43	45	88	38	23	13	11	24	10
2019–20	San Jose Barracuda	AHL	25	7	12	19	15	—	—	—	—	—
2019–20	San Jose Sharks	NHL	28	3	2	5	8	—	—	—	—	—
2020–21	San Jose Sharks	NHL	30	5	1	6	6	—	—	—	—	—
2020–21	San Jose Barracuda	AHL	10	3	6	9	2	—	—	—	—	—
2021–22	San Jose Barracuda	AHL	8	4	8	12	7	—	—	—	—	—
2021–22	San Jose Sharks	NHL	63	8	15	23	25	—	—	—	—	—
2022–23	San Jose Sharks	NHL	57	10	7	17	32	—	—	—	—	—
2023–24	Toronto Maple Leafs	NHL	63	6	6	12	17	2	0	0	0	0
2024–25	Ottawa Senators	NHL	40	4	2	6	17	—	—	—	—	—
2024–25	San Jose Sharks	NHL	12	0	1	1	11	—	—	—	—	—
2025–26	Florida Panthers	NHL	37	4	5	9	26	—	—	—	—	—
2025–26	Charlotte Checkers	AHL	26	11	6	17	4	3	2	0	2	4
NHL totals			330	40	39	79	142	2	0	0	0	0

=== International ===
Year	Team	Event	Result	GP	G	A	Pts	PIM
2016	Canada	U18	4th	5	0	2	2	2
2022	Canada	WC	2nd place, silver medalist(s)	7	2	1	3	4
Junior totals				5	0	2	2	2
Senior totals				7	2	1	3	4
