= Brendan Guhle =

Canadian ice hockey player

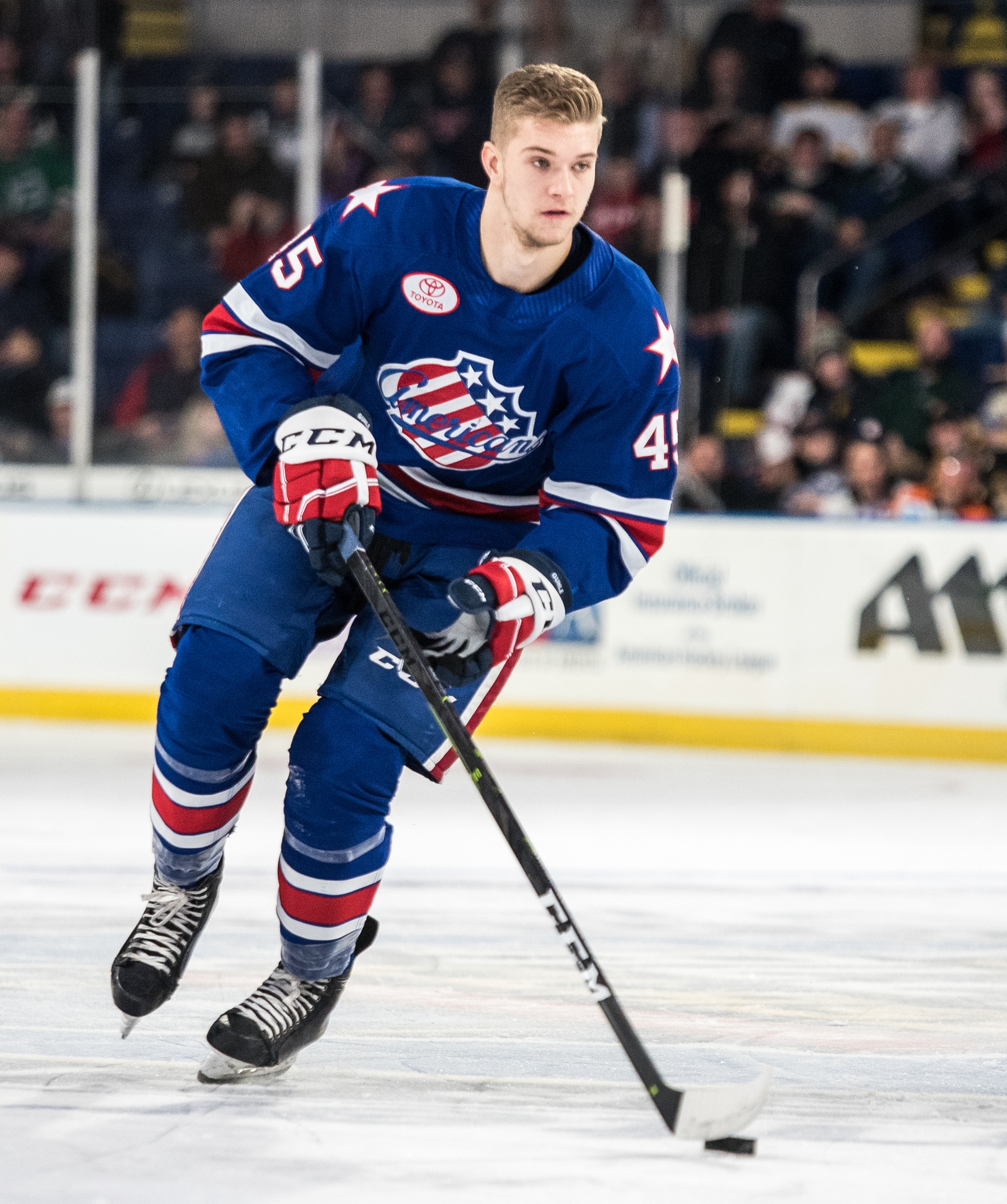
- Guhle with the Rochester Americans in 2019
- Born: July 29, 1997 (age 29) Edmonton, Alberta, Canada
- Height: 6 ft 2 in (188 cm)
- Weight: 197 lb (89 kg; 14 st 1 lb)
- Position: Defence
- Shot: Left
- Played for: Buffalo Sabres; Anaheim Ducks; Eisbaren Berlin
- NHL draft: 51st overall, 2015; Buffalo Sabres
- Playing career: 2016–2022

Brendan Guhle (/ˈɡuːliː/ GOO-lee; born July 29, 1997) is a Canadian former professional ice hockey defenceman. Guhle was selected by the Buffalo Sabres in the second round, 51st overall, of the 2015 NHL entry draft.

== Playing career ==
=== Junior ===
In the 2012 Western Hockey League Bantam Draft, Guhle was drafted with the third-overall pick by the Prince Albert Raiders.

In January 2014, Guhle was a member of Canada's silver medal-winning Team Pacific at the World U-17 Hockey Challenge.

In January 2015, Guhle participated in the BMO CHL/NHL Top Prospects Game, a showcase of the Canadian Hockey League's top draft eligible players for the 2015 NHL Draft. In 2015, he was a member of Team Canada's WHL team in the CHL Canada-Russia series.

Guhle was drafted in the second round, 51st overall, by the Buffalo Sabres in the 2015 NHL entry draft. On July 27, 2015, the Sabres signed Guhle to a 3-year entry-level contract.

Guhle played four games with the Sabres during the 2015 preseason, recording two assists. The team chose to return him to Prince Albert for the 2015–16 season. When Prince Albert's season ended, Guhle was recalled to the Rochester Americans of the American Hockey League.

During the 2016–17 season, the Raiders traded Guhle to the Prince George Cougars.

=== Professional ===
==== Buffalo Sabres ====
On December 2, 2016, Guhle was called up by the Sabres on an emergency basis. Guhle played three games for the Sabres while the team's defensemen were injured; while Guhle impressed the Sabres organization during his time in Buffalo, the clause in the NHL Collective Bargaining Agreement allowing for his emergency call-up also forced the team to return him to Prince George when one of their defensemen returned to health.

Guhle began the 2017–18 season with the Rochester Americans and received a call-up to the Sabres on January 8, 2018. He featured in 18 games with the Sabres, posting 5 assists, before completing the season with the Americans, registering 26 points in 50 games.

In the following 2018–19 season, Guhle continued with Rochester, earning a recall to the Sabres on December 16, 2018, making two scoreless appearances before returning to the Americans. He was selected to the AHL All-Star Classic and participated in the 2019 AHL Skills Competition where he posted the sixth-fastest time in the fastest skater competition in event history. Guhle ranked second among Rochester defensemen with 27 points in 50 games.

==== Anaheim Ducks ====
On February 24, 2019, Guhle was traded by the Sabres, along with a 2019 first-round pick to the Anaheim Ducks in exchange for Brandon Montour. During the pause of the 2019–20 season, on May 10, 2020, Guhle was signed a two-year, $1.6 million contract extension with the Ducks.

==== Eisbären Berlin ====
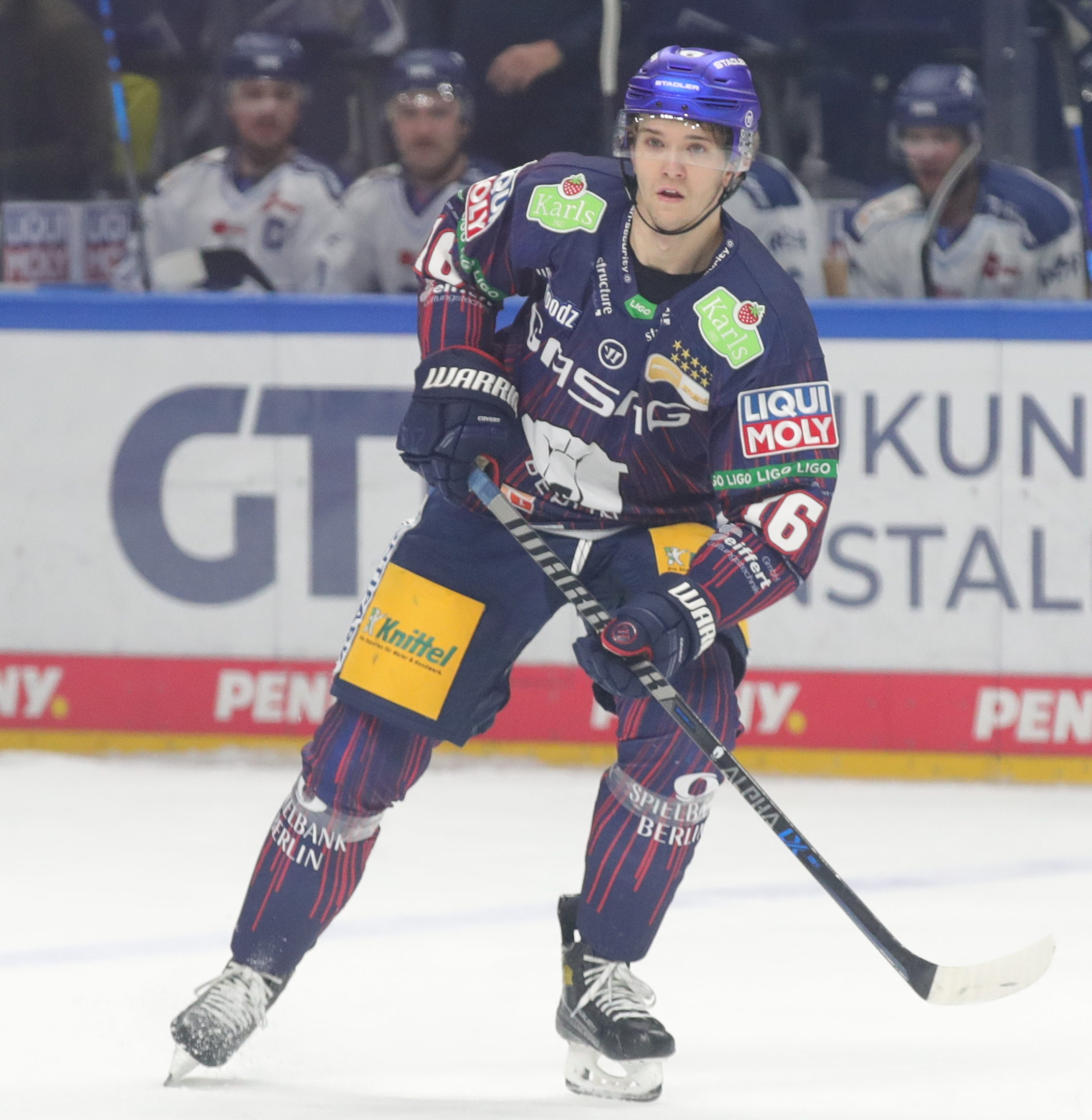
Guhle in December 2022

With his NHL prospects having stagnated within the Ducks organization, as an impending restricted free agent Guhle opted to sign his first contract abroad in agreeing to a one-year deal with German club, Eisbären Berlin of the DEL, on July 5, 2022.

On December 20, 2022, Guhle retired from hockey for personal reasons.

== Personal life ==
Guhle grew up in Sherwood Park, Alberta and is a graduate of Archbishop Jordan High School. His younger brother Kaiden, also a hockey player, was drafted sixteenth overall in the 2020 NHL entry draft by the Montreal Canadiens.

== Career statistics ==
=== Regular season and playoffs ===
			Regular season					Playoffs
Season	Team	League	GP	G	A	Pts	PIM	GP	G	A	Pts	PIM
2012–13	Sherwood Park Kings	AMHL	32	3	8	11	34	9	1	4	5	10
2013–14	Prince Albert Raiders	WHL	51	0	10	10	29	5	1	1	2	0
2014–15	Prince Albert Raiders	WHL	72	5	27	32	36	—	—	—	—	—
2015–16	Prince Albert Raiders	WHL	63	10	18	28	53	5	0	3	3	6
2015–16	Rochester Americans	AHL	6	1	3	4	0	—	—	—	—	—
2016–17	Prince Albert Raiders	WHL	15	2	2	4	10	—	—	—	—	—
2016–17	Prince George Cougars	WHL	32	13	16	29	22	6	0	6	6	4
2016–17	Buffalo Sabres	NHL	3	0	0	0	0	—	—	—	—	—
2016–17	Rochester Americans	AHL	6	1	1	2	2	—	—	—	—	—
2017–18	Rochester Americans	AHL	50	8	18	26	26	3	0	0	0	2
2017–18	Buffalo Sabres	NHL	18	0	5	5	10	—	—	—	—	—
2018–19	Rochester Americans	AHL	50	5	22	27	34	—	—	—	—	—
2018–19	Buffalo Sabres	NHL	2	0	0	0	2	—	—	—	—	—
2018–19	Anaheim Ducks	NHL	6	0	1	1	2	—	—	—	—	—
2019–20	Anaheim Ducks	NHL	30	4	4	8	10	—	—	—	—	—
2019–20	San Diego Gulls	AHL	27	4	10	14	18	—	—	—	—	—
2020–21	San Diego Gulls	AHL	23	2	10	12	25	—	—	—	—	—
2021–22	San Diego Gulls	AHL	37	3	4	7	28	—	—	—	—	—
2021–22	Anaheim Ducks	NHL	6	0	0	0	0	—	—	—	—	—
2022–23	Eisbären Berlin	DEL	7	0	0	0	6	—	—	—	—	—
NHL totals			65	4	10	14	24	—	—	—	—	—

=== International ===
Year	Team	Event	Result	GP	G	A	Pts	PIM
2014	Canada Pacific	U17	2nd place, silver medalist(s)	6	0	1	1	4
Junior totals				6	0	1	1	4

== Awards and honours ==
Award	Year
WHL
CHL Top Prospects Game	2015
AHL
All-Star Game	2019
