= Jakub Lauko =

Czech ice hockey player (born 2000)

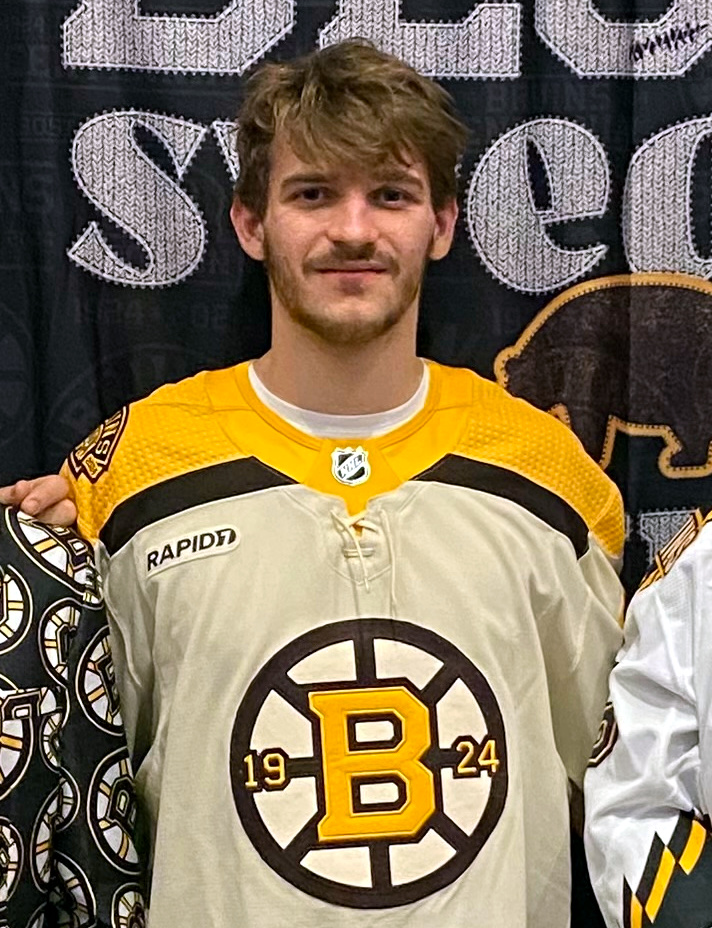
- Lauko with the Bruins in 2023
- Born: 28 March 2000 (age 26) Prague, Czech Republic
- Height: 6 ft 1 in (185 cm)
- Weight: 193 lb (88 kg; 13 st 11 lb)
- Position: Forward
- Shoots: Left
- ELH team Former teams: HC Dynamo Pardubice; Piráti Chomutov; HC Energie Karlovy Vary; Boston Bruins; Minnesota Wild
- National team: Czech Republic
- NHL draft: 77th overall, 2018; Boston Bruins
- Playing career: 2016–present

Jakub Lauko (born 28 March 2000) is a Czech professional ice hockey forward for HC Dynamo Pardubice of the Czech Extraliga (ELH). The Boston Bruins selected him in the third round, 77th overall, of the 2018 NHL entry draft. Lauko has also played for the Minnesota Wild, before being reacquired by the Bruins.

== Playing career ==
=== Amateur ===
After two seasons with Piráti Chomutov of the Czech Extraliga (ELH), Lauko was selected in the third round (77th overall) by the Boston Bruins in the 2018 NHL entry draft. On 28 September 2018, the Bruins signed him to a three-year, entry-level contract.

Lauko joined the Rouyn-Noranda Huskies of the Quebec Major Junior Hockey League (QMJHL) for the 2018–19 season. He recorded 41 points in 44 games. The Huskies defeated the Halifax Mooseheads in four games to win the President's Cup. Lauko finished the postseason with 13 points in 19 games. The Huskies then went on to capture the Memorial Cup. Lauko led the tournament in scoring with eight points in five games.

=== Boston Bruins ===
Lauko joined the Providence Bruins of the American Hockey League (AHL) for the 2019–20 season. On 7 December, he was stretchered off the ice in a game against the Utica Comets. After checking Comets' forward Justin Bailey, Lauko collapsed to the ice. However, he was able to give a thumbs-up whilst exiting the game. Lauko finished the season with nine points in 22 games.

On 17 August 2020, the Bruins loaned Lauko to HC Energie Karlovy Vary of the Czech Extraliga until the commencement of the delayed 2020–21 North American season. Lauko returned to Providence, playing 23 games and totalling 19 points in the shortened North American season.

In the 2022–23 season, Lauko got his first chance at the NHL roster. Lauko made his NHL debut on 12 October 2022, against the Washington Capitals. He would register his first NHL point on an assist to a goal by Nick Foligno, who he developed a bond with and affectionately calls "Uncle Nick". On 15 October 2022, it seemed like Lauko scored his first NHL goal against the Arizona Coyotes, but the goal was later called back for goalie interference. He would then score his first NHL goal that counted on 1 November 2022, against the Pittsburgh Penguins. Throughout the season, Lauko bounced between the NHL club and the Providence Bruins. In 23 NHL games, Lauko had 4 goals and 3 assists in his first NHL season.

On 5 July 2023, Lauko signed a two-year contract worth $787,500 AAV with the Bruins, with the first year being a two-way deal.

=== Minnesota Wild ===
On 29 June 2024, Lauko was traded along with a fourth-round selection (122nd overall) in the 2024 NHL entry draft to the Minnesota Wild for Vinni Lettieri and a 2024 fourth-round selection (110th overall).

=== Return to Boston ===
On 6 March 2025, Lauko was traded back to the Bruins, alongside Marat Khusnutdinov and a 2026 sixth-round draft pick, in exchange for Justin Brazeau. Lauko played out the remainder of the season with the Bruins, posting two goals and five points in 18 appearances as Boston missed the playoffs for the first time in 9 years.

=== HC Dynamo Pardubice ===
As a free agent from the Bruins after not being tendered a qualifying offer, Lauko opted to return to the Czech Republic by signing a three-year contract with HC Dynamo Pardubice of the ELH on 1 August 2025.

== Personal life ==
Lauko is of partial Ukrainian descent through his grandmother, who was from Lviv.

== Career statistics ==
=== Regular season and playoffs ===
			Regular season					Playoffs
Season	Team	League	GP	G	A	Pts	PIM	GP	G	A	Pts	PIM
2016–17	Piráti Chomutov	ELH	28	2	0	2	2	9	0	0	0	4
2017–18	Piráti Chomutov	ELH	42	3	6	9	20	—	—	—	—	—
2018–19	Rouyn-Noranda Huskies	QMJHL	44	21	20	41	43	19	6	7	13	17
2019–20	Providence Bruins	AHL	22	5	4	9	24	—	—	—	—	—
2020–21	HC Energie Karlovy Vary	ELH	25	5	5	10	26	—	—	—	—	—
2020–21	Providence Bruins	AHL	23	5	14	19	28	—	—	—	—	—
2021–22	Providence Bruins	AHL	54	3	13	16	56	2	1	0	1	2
2022–23	Providence Bruins	AHL	35	10	7	17	58	1	0	0	0	0
2022–23	Boston Bruins	NHL	23	4	3	7	11	3	0	1	1	4
2023–24	Boston Bruins	NHL	60	2	8	10	32	5	1	0	1	2
2024–25	Minnesota Wild	NHL	38	3	3	6	27	—	—	—	—	—
2024–25	Boston Bruins	NHL	18	2	3	5	20	—	—	—	—	—
2025–26	HC Dynamo Pardubice	ELH	34	10	12	22	45	15	0	3	3	8
ELH totals			129	20	23	43	93	24	0	3	3	12
NHL totals			139	11	17	28	90	8	1	1	2	6

Medal record

Representing Czech Republic

Ice hockey

Ivan Hlinka Memorial Tournament
Silver medal – second place	2017 Czech Republic/Slovakia	

=== International ===
Year	Team	Event	Result	GP	G	A	Pts	PIM
2016	Czech Republic	U17	8th	5	4	3	7	14
2017	Czech Republic	IH18	2nd place, silver medalist(s)	5	4	0	4	8
2018	Czech Republic	WJC	4th	6	1	0	1	4
2018	Czech Republic	U18	4th	7	3	3	6	8
2019	Czech Republic	WJC	7th	5	1	1	2	6
2020	Czech Republic	WJC	7th	1	0	0	0	0
2025	Czechia	WC	6th	7	1	1	2	2
Junior totals				29	13	7	20	40
Senior totals				7	1	1	2	2

== Awards and honors ==
Award	Year
CHL / QMJHL
QMJHL President's Cup champion	2019
Memorial Cup champion	2019
Ed Chynoweth Trophy	2019
AHL
AHL Atlantic Division All-Star Team	2021
