= Sean Durzi =

Canadian ice hockey player (born 1998)

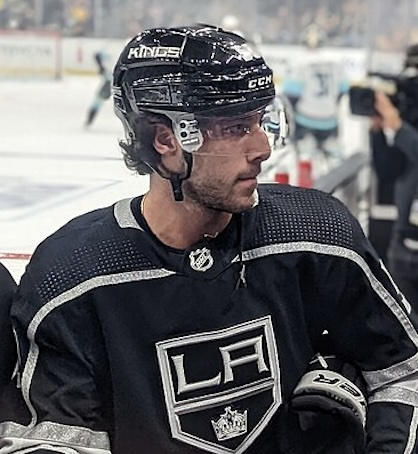
- Durzi with the Los Angeles Kings in 2022
- Born: October 21, 1998 (age 28) Mississauga, Ontario, Canada
- Height: 6 ft 0 in (183 cm)
- Weight: 196 lb (89 kg; 14 st 0 lb)
- Position: Defence
- Shoots: Right
- NHL team Former teams: New York Rangers; Los Angeles Kings; Arizona Coyotes; Utah Mammoth
- NHL draft: 52nd overall, 2018; Toronto Maple Leafs
- Playing career: 2019–present

Sean Durzi (born October 21, 1998) is a Canadian professional ice hockey player who is a defenceman for the New York Rangers of the National Hockey League (NHL).

Born and raised in Mississauga, Ontario, Canada, Durzi grew up playing AAA ice hockey with the Mississauga Braves before joining the Mississauga Rebels of the Greater Toronto Hockey League. After tallying 14 points and 8 penalty minutes with the Rebels during the 2013–14 season, Durzi was drafted by the Owen Sound Attack of the Ontario Hockey League. Durzi missed significant time with the Attack in the 2017–18 season due to an ankle injury but finished the season with 15 goals and 34 assists. As a result of his major junior play, Durzi was drafted 52nd overall by the Toronto Maple Leafs in the 2018 NHL entry draft.

== Early life ==
Durzi was born on October 21, 1998, in Mississauga, Ontario, Canada to parents Sue and Raami Durzi. He began skating at the age of five and originally played goaltender in the Timbits Learn To Play Program before his mother forced him to switch to defenceman. He grew up alongside Riley Damiani as their fathers were childhood friends. Growing up, Durzi idolized Toronto Maple Leafs player Bryan McCabe and attempted to emulate his play on the ice.

== Playing career ==
=== Early career ===
Growing up in Mississauga, Durzi played AA hockey with the Mississauga Braves before moving up to join the Mississauga Rebels of the Greater Toronto Hockey League. After tallying 14 points and 8 penalty minutes with the Rebels during the 2013–14 season, Durzi was drafted by the Owen Sound Attack of the Ontario Hockey League (OHL). He returned to the Rebels for the 2014–15 season, where he played 31 games and also appeared in two games for the St. Michael's Buzzers of the Ontario Junior Hockey League. Durzi later stated that his extra year with the Rebels was "definitely a big part of my career."

=== Major junior ===
Durzi joined the Owen Sound Attack for the 2015–16 season where he recorded 10 goals and six assists for 16 points through 45 games. He recorded his first OHL goal on October 18, 2015, in a 4–3 overtime win over the Windsor Spitfires. He finished the season with the teams' Howard Hindman Award as their scholastic player of the year.

The following season, Durzi garnered the attention of the National Hockey League (NHL) scouts and was ranked 139th in their midterm reports leading up to the 2017 NHL entry draft. At the time of the report, Durzi had tallied one goal and 20 assists, despite missing the beginning of the season with a lower-body injury. Following the report, Durzi was named the team's Player of the Week after his assist helped extend the team's franchise record winning streak to 14 games. He finished the season ranked 124th overall after tallying 38 points through 60 games for fifth among all OHL defencemen in points per game. Despite this, he went undrafted in the 2017 NHL Entry Draft and was invited to attend the mini camps of the Toronto Maple Leafs, New York Islanders, and Florida Panthers.

Durzi's return to the Owen Sound Attack for the 2017–18 season was delayed due to an ankle injury. Doctors discovered that Durzi had an extra bone growing in his ankle and he required surgery to remove it. Upon re-joining the lineup, Durzi tallied 15 goals and 34 assists to finish eighth in scoring among OHL defensemen. His 1.23 points per game and his 0.38 goals per game ranked second across the league. As well, his 3.05 shots per game helped the Attack outscored the opposition 55–38 with Durzi on the ice at 5-on-5. As a result of his improved play, Durzi was drafted 52nd overall by the Toronto Maple Leafs in the 2018 NHL entry draft. Following the draft, Durzi participated in the Leafs' Development Camp before returning to the OHL.

In his final OHL season, Durzi was traded to the Guelph Storm alongside Nick Suzuki and Zachary Roberts in exchange for Mark Woolley, Barret Kirwin, Zach Poirier, a 2nd-round pick in 2022, a 3rd-round pick in 2021, a conditional 3rd-round pick in 2022 and a 4th-round pick in 2019. At the time of the trade, Durzi ranked 6th place all-time for points scored by a defenseman with 119 in 163 career games. Upon joining the Storm, Durzi was also traded to the Los Angeles Kings along with Carl Grundström and a first-round pick in the 2019 NHL entry draft in exchange for defenseman Jake Muzzin. He later worked alongside Suzuki to help the Storm beat the Rouyn-Noranda Huskies 5–2 and contributed both goals for the Storm in their 4–2 loss to the Halifax Mooseheads. He finished the 2019 Memorial Cup tournament with seven points and was named to the 2019 Memorial Cup All-Star Team.

=== Professional ===
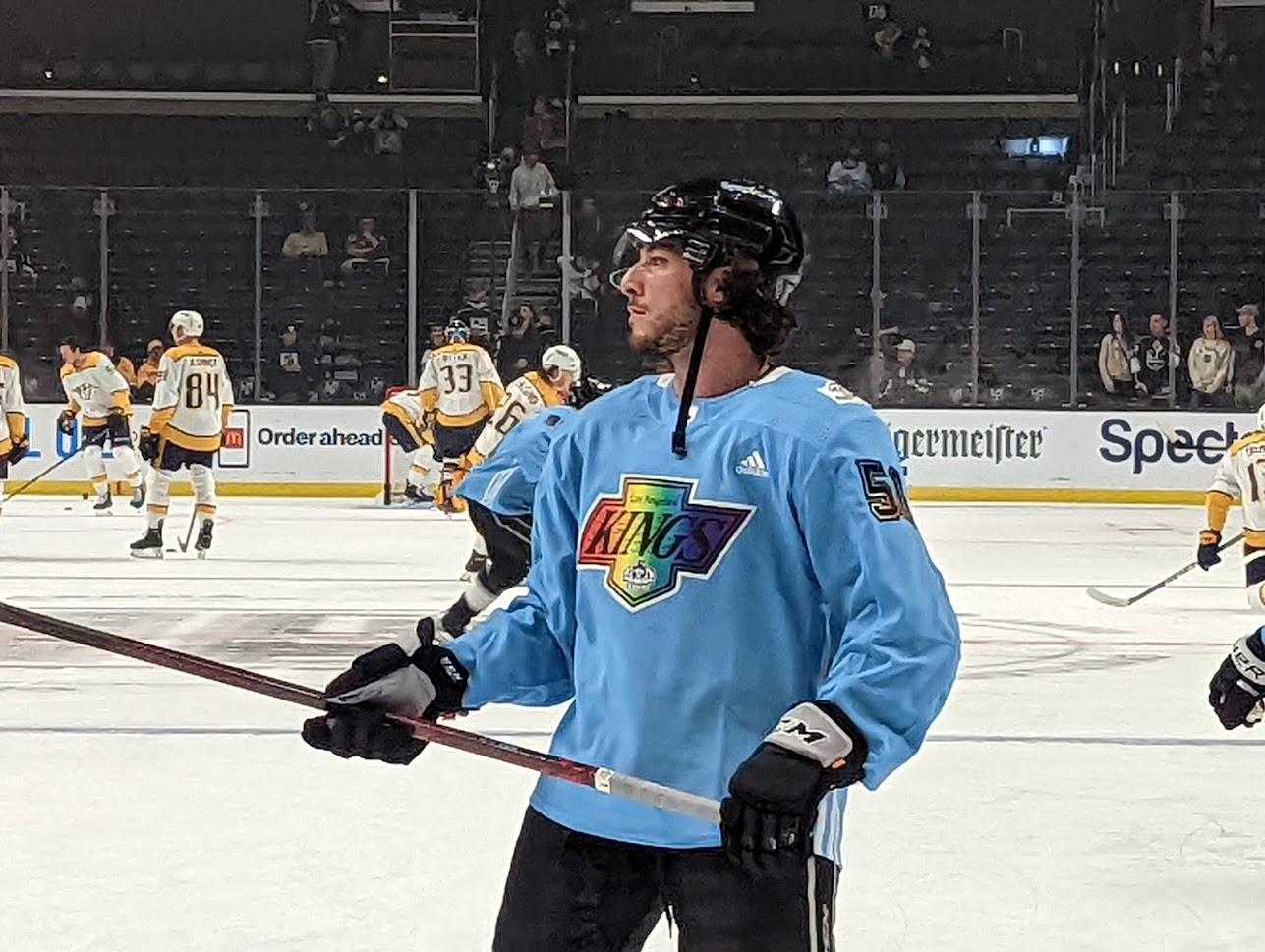
Durzi during pre-game warmups with the Kings in March 2022

Following his 2018–19 season, Durzi signed a three-year entry-level contract with the Kings. Following this, he attended the Kings' Development Camp but was reassigned to their American Hockey League (AHL) affiliate, the Ontario Reign to begin the 2019–20 season. Upon joining the Reign, Durzi scored his first professional goal in a 6–2 loss to the San Diego Gulls on November 15, 2019. Durzi concluded his rookie season with the Reign totalling two goals and 12 assists for 14 points through 39 games.

Due to the COVID-19 pandemic, the 2020–21 season began in January 2021. Durzi attended the Kings' Development Camp but was reassigned to the Reign for the remainder of the shortened season. Durzi surpassed his previous seasons total and accumulated four goals and 16 assists for 20 points through 39 games.

Prior to the 2021–22 season, Durzi represented the Kings during the 2021 Rookie Faceoff against the Arizona Coyotes, Colorado Avalanche, and Vegas Golden Knights. He was subsequently returned to the AHL but earned his first NHL recall on November 19. At the time of the call-up, Durzi had tallied 13 points through 12 games with the Reign. He made his NHL debut on November 24 against the Toronto Maple Leafs, scoring a goal and an assist in a 6–2 loss while playing 15:52 of ice time. Durzi remained with the Kings following his debut and quickly collected four points for a three-game point streak to begin his NHL career. Later, Durzi registered his sixth assist of the season to rank fourth most among all NHL rookie defensemen. He continued to produce offensively for the Kings and tied the Kings record for most assists by a rookie defenseman in a single game during a 4–3 shootout loss to the Chicago Blackhawks. Despite his success, Durzi also experienced a 29-game goal drought that was snapped on March 27 in a 4–2 win over the Seattle Kraken. By the end of March, Durzi ranked third among division rookies with 23 points and second with 12 power-play points. His point total also surpassed defenceman Drew Doughty for most points by a Kings rookie.

On June 24, 2023, Durzi was traded by the Kings to the Arizona Coyotes in exchange for a 2024 second-round draft pick.

On April 17, 2024, Durzi scored the final goal in Coyotes history prior to their inactivation, shooting into an empty net as the Coyotes defeated the Edmonton Oilers 5–2. Shortly after, the Coyotes' franchise was suspended and team assets were subsequently transferred to the expansion Utah Mammoth; as a result, Durzi became a member of the Utah team.

That summer, Durzi signed a 4-year, $24 million contract extension with Utah. Durzi faced multiple injury setbacks during his two seasons with Utah, a right shoulder injury limited Durzi to 30 games in 2024-25 and 60 games in 2025-26 due to an upper body injury.

After two seasons in Utah, Durzi was traded on July 1, 2026, along with prospect Cole Beaudoin and a 2027 third round pick to the New York Rangers in exchange for Vincent Trocheck.

== Career statistics ==
			Regular season					Playoffs
Season	Team	League	GP	G	A	Pts	PIM	GP	G	A	Pts	PIM
2014–15	St. Michael's Buzzers	OJHL	2	0	1	1	2	—	—	—	—	—
2015–16	Owen Sound Attack	OHL	45	10	6	16	19	5	0	1	1	0
2016–17	Owen Sound Attack	OHL	60	2	36	38	24	17	1	8	9	8
2017–18	Owen Sound Attack	OHL	40	15	34	49	12	11	4	12	16	4
2018–19	Owen Sound Attack	OHL	18	3	14	17	19	—	—	—	—	—
2018–19	Guelph Storm	OHL	17	8	12	20	6	24	3	24	27	14
2019–20	Ontario Reign	AHL	39	2	12	14	20	—	—	—	—	—
2020–21	Ontario Reign	AHL	39	4	16	20	32	—	—	—	—	—
2021–22	Ontario Reign	AHL	13	5	11	16	20	—	—	—	—	—
2021–22	Los Angeles Kings	NHL	64	3	24	27	55	7	1	2	3	6
2022–23	Los Angeles Kings	NHL	72	9	29	38	50	6	1	0	1	2
2023–24	Arizona Coyotes	NHL	76	9	32	41	63	—	—	—	—	—
2024–25	Utah Hockey Club	NHL	30	4	7	11	19	—	—	—	—	—
2025–26	Utah Mammoth	NHL	60	5	22	27	50	6	0	2	2	4
NHL totals			302	30	114	144	237	19	2	4	6	12

== Awards and honours ==
Award	Year
OHL
Second All-Star Team	2018
CHL Memorial Cup All-Star Team	2019
