= 2022 World Junior Ice Hockey Championships rosters =

Below are the rosters for teams competed in the original attempt 2022 World Junior Ice Hockey Championships. The IIHF allowed rosters to be changed, and overage players were grandfathered for the rescheduled tournament in August 2022.

== Group A ==
=== Austria ===
- Head coach: (Austria) Marco Pewal

| Pos. | No. | Player | Team | League | NHL Rights |
|---|---|---|---|---|---|
| G | 1 | Leon Sommer | (Austria) Steel Wings Linz | (Austria) AlpsHL | |
| G | 29 | Lukas Moser | (Austria) EC Kitzbühel | (Austria) AlpsHL | |
| G | 30 | Sebastian Wraneschitz | (Austria) Vienna Capitals Silver | (Austria) AlpsHL | |
| D | 2 | Matteo Mitrovic | (Austria) Nordic Hockey Academy U20 | (Austria) ICEYSL | |
| D | 3 | Lukas Hörl | (Austria) Red Bull Hockey Juniors | (Austria) AlpsHL | |
| D | 4 | Lorenz Lindner | (Austria) KAC II | (Austria) AlpsHL | |
| D | 5 | David Reinbacher | (Switzerland) EHC Kloten | (Switzerland) SL | Eligible 2023 |
| D | 7 | Luca Erne | (United States) Fresno Monsters | (United States) USPHL | |
| D | 10 | Lukas Necesany | (Austria) Red Bull Hockey Juniors | (Austria) AlpsHL | |
| D | 12 | Tobias Sablattnig | (Austria) KAC II | (Austria) AlpsHL | |
| D | 16 | Christoph Tialler | (Austria) KAC II | (Austria) AlpsHL | |
| D | 18 | Martin Urbanek | (Austria) Villacher SV II | (Austria) Austria3 | |
| F | 6 | Luca Auer | (Austria) Red Bull Hockey Juniors | (Austria) AlpsHL | |
| F | 8 | Mathias Böhm | (Austria) Vienna Capitals Silver | (Austria) AlpsHL | |
| F | 9 | Maximilian Hengelmüller | (Austria) Red Bull Hockey Juniors | (Austria) AlpsHL | |
| F | 13 | Leon Wallner | (Sweden) Södertälje J20 | (Sweden) J20 Nationell | |
| F | 14 | Tim Geifes | (United States) South Shore Kings | (United States) USPHL | |
| F | 15 | Finn van Ee | (Austria) KAC II | (Austria) AlpsHL | |
| F | 17 | Senna Peeters | (Canada) Halifax Mooseheads | (Canada) QMJHL | |
| F | 19 | Marco Kasper | (Sweden) Rögle BK | (Sweden) SHL | Detroit Red Wings |
| F | 20 | Kilian Rappold | (Austria) EA Steiermark U20 | (Austria) ICEYSL | |
| F | 21 | Oskar Maier | (Austria) Red Bull Hockey Juniors | (Austria) AlpsHL | |
| F | 23 | Vinzenz Rohrer | (Canada) Ottawa 67's | (Canada) OHL | Montreal Canadiens |
| F | 24 | Lucas Thaler | (Austria) EC Red Bull Salzburg | (Austria) ICEHL | |
| F | 26 | Johannes Tschurnig | (Austria) Villacher SV II | (Austria) Austria3 | |

=== Canada ===
- Head coach: (Canada) Dave Cameron

| Pos. | No. | Player | Team | League | NHL Rights |
|---|---|---|---|---|---|
| G | 1 | Sebastian Cossa | (Canada) Edmonton Oil Kings | (Canada) WHL | Detroit Red Wings |
| G | 30 | Brett Brochu | (Canada) London Knights | (Canada) OHL | |
| G | 31 | Dylan Garand | (Canada) Kamloops Blazers | (Canada) WHL | New York Rangers |
| D | 3 | Olen Zellweger | (United States) Everett Silvertips | (Canada) WHL | Anaheim Ducks |
| D | 4 | Carson Lambos | (Canada) Winnipeg Ice | (Canada) WHL | Minnesota Wild |
| D | 6 | Lukas Cormier | (Canada) Charlottetown Islanders | (Canada) QMJHL | Vegas Golden Knights |
| D | 7 | Donovan Sebrango | (United States) Grand Rapids Griffins | (United States) AHL | Detroit Red Wings |
| D | 8 | Ronan Seeley | (United States) Everett Silvertips | (Canada) WHL | Carolina Hurricanes |
| D | 21 | Kaiden Guhle [C] | (Canada) Edmonton Oil Kings | (Canada) WHL | Montreal Canadiens |
| D | 25 | Owen Power | (United States) University of Michigan | (United States) NCAA | Buffalo Sabres |
| D | 28 | Ryan O'Rourke | (Canada) Sault Ste. Marie Greyhounds | (Canada) OHL | Minnesota Wild |
| F | 9 | Dylan Guenther | (Canada) Edmonton Oil Kings | (Canada) WHL | Arizona Coyotes |
| F | 10 | Logan Stankoven | (Canada) Kamloops Blazers | (Canada) WHL | Dallas Stars |
| F | 11 | Cole Perfetti [A] | (Canada) Manitoba Moose | (United States) AHL | Winnipeg Jets |
| F | 12 | Jake Neighbours [A] | (Canada) Edmonton Oil Kings | (Canada) WHL | St. Louis Blues |
| F | 13 | Kent Johnson | (United States) University of Michigan | (United States) NCAA | Columbus Blue Jackets |
| F | 15 | Shane Wright | (Canada) Kingston Frontenacs | (Canada) OHL | Seattle Kraken |
| F | 16 | Connor Bedard | (Canada) Regina Pats | (Canada) WHL | Eligible 2023 |
| F | 17 | Ridly Greig | (Canada) Brandon Wheat Kings | (Canada) WHL | Ottawa Senators |
| F | 18 | Xavier Bourgault | (Canada) Shawinigan Cataractes | (Canada) QMJHL | Edmonton Oilers |
| F | 19 | Elliot Desnoyers | (Canada) Halifax Mooseheads | (Canada) QMJHL | Philadelphia Flyers |
| F | 22 | Mavrik Bourque | (Canada) Shawinigan Cataractes | (Canada) QMJHL | Dallas Stars |
| F | 23 | Mason McTavish | (Canada) Peterborough Petes | (Canada) OHL | Anaheim Ducks |
| F | 24 | Justin Sourdif | (Canada) Vancouver Giants | (Canada) WHL | Florida Panthers |
| F | 27 | Will Cuylle | (Canada) Windsor Spitfires | (Canada) OHL | New York Rangers |

=== Czechia ===
- Head coach: (Czech Republic) Karel Mlejnek

| Pos. | No. | Player | Team | League | NHL Rights |
|---|---|---|---|---|---|
| G | 1 | Jakub Málek | (Czech Republic) VHK Vsetín | (Czech Republic) Czech 1. liga | New Jersey Devils |
| G | 2 | Jan Bednář | (Canada) Acadie–Bathurst Titan | (Canada) QMJHL | Detroit Red Wings |
| G | 30 | Daniel Král | (Czech Republic) HC Benátky nad Jizerou | (Czech Republic) Czech 1. liga | |
| D | 3 | David Špaček | (Canada) Sherbrooke Phoenix | (Canada) QMJHL | Minnesota Wild |
| D | 4 | Jiří Ticháček | (Czech Republic) Rytíři Kladno | (Czech Republic) Czech Extraliga | |
| D | 5 | David Jiříček [A] | (Czech Republic) HC Škoda Plzeň | (Czech Republic) Czech Extraliga | Columbus Blue Jackets |
| D | 8 | David Moravec | (Czech Republic) BK Mladá Boleslav | (Czech Republic) Czech Extraliga | |
| D | 14 | Stanislav Svozil | (Canada) Regina Pats | (Canada) WHL | Columbus Blue Jackets |
| D | 22 | Michal Hrádek | (Czech Republic) HC Dynamo Pardubice | (Czech Republic) Czech Extraliga | |
| D | 28 | Michael Krutil | (United States) Rockford IceHogs | (United States) AHL | Chicago Blackhawks |
| F | 9 | Jakub Konečný | (Czech Republic) HC Sparta Praha | (Czech Republic) Czech Extraliga | Buffalo Sabres |
| F | 10 | Sebastian Malat | (Czech Republic) HC Škoda Plzeň | (Czech Republic) Czech Extraliga | |
| F | 11 | Pavel Novák | (Canada) Kelowna Rockets | (Canada) WHL | Minnesota Wild |
| F | 12 | Jakub Brabenec | (Canada) Charlottetown Islanders | (Canada) QMJHL | Vegas Golden Knights |
| F | 15 | Jakub Kos | (Finland) Ilves | (Finland) Liiga | Florida Panthers |
| F | 16 | Ivan Ivan | (Canada) Cape Breton Eagles | (Canada) QMJHL | |
| F | 19 | Jan Myšák [C] | (Canada) Hamilton Bulldogs | (Canada) OHL | Montreal Canadiens |
| F | 26 | Michal Gut [A] | (United States) Everett Silvertips | (Canada) WHL | |
| F | 27 | Jiří Kulich | (Czech Republic) HC Energie Karlovy Vary | (Czech Republic) Czech Extraliga | Buffalo Sabres |
| F | 29 | Martin Ryšavý | (Canada) Moose Jaw Warriors | (Canada) WHL | Columbus Blue Jackets |

=== Finland ===
- Head coach: (Finland) Antti Pennanen

| Pos. | No. | Player | Team | League | NHL Rights |
|---|---|---|---|---|---|
| G | 1 | Leevi Meriläinen | (Canada) Kingston Frontenacs | (Canada) OHL | Ottawa Senators |
| G | 30 | Joel Blomqvist | (Finland) Kärpät | (Finland) Liiga | Pittsburgh Penguins |
| G | 31 | Juha Jatkola | (Finland) KalPa | (Finland) U20 SM-sarja | |
| D | 2 | Karri Aho | (Finland) KOOVEE | (Finland) Mestis | |
| D | 3 | Ruben Rafkin | (Finland) TPS | (Finland) Liiga | |
| D | 4 | Ville Ottavainen | (Finland) JYP | (Finland) Liiga | Seattle Kraken |
| D | 6 | Eemil Viro | (Finland) TPS | (Finland) Liiga | Detroit Red Wings |
| D | 7 | Topi Niemelä [A] | (Finland) Kärpät | (Finland) Liiga | Toronto Maple Leafs |
| D | 10 | Kasper Puutio [A] | (Finland) Kärpät | (Finland) Liiga | Florida Panthers |
| D | 15 | Petteri Nurmi | (Finland) HPK | (Finland) Liiga | Montreal Canadiens |
| D | 21 | Aleksi Heimosalmi | (Finland) Ässät | (Finland) Liiga | Carolina Hurricanes |
| D | 4 | Joni Jurmo | (Finland) Jukurit | (Finland) Liiga | Vancouver Canucks |
| F | 13 | Roby Järventie | (Canada) Belleville Senators | (United States) AHL | Ottawa Senators |
| F | 19 | Juuso Mäenpää | (Finland) KalPa | (Finland) Liiga | |
| F | 20 | Samuel Helenius | (Finland) JYP | (Finland) Liiga | Los Angeles Kings |
| F | 22 | Roni Hirvonen [C] | (Finland) HIFK | (Finland) Liiga | Toronto Maple Leafs |
| F | 23 | Kalle Väisänen | (Finland) TPS | (Finland) Liiga | New York Rangers |
| F | 24 | Ville Koivunen | (Finland) Kärpät | (Finland) Liiga | Carolina Hurricanes |
| F | 27 | Oliver Kapanen | (Finland) KalPa | (Finland) Liiga | Montreal Canadiens |
| F | 28 | Sami Päivärinta | (Finland) Lukko | (Finland) U20 SM-sarja | |
| F | 29 | Kasper Simontaival | (Finland) KalPa | (Finland) Liiga | Los Angeles Kings |
| F | 32 | Joel Määttä | (United States) University of Vermont | (United States) NCAA | Edmonton Oilers |
| F | 33 | Brad Lambert | (Finland) JYP | (Finland) Liiga | Winnipeg Jets |
| F | 34 | Roni Karvinen | (Finland) SaiPa | (Finland) Liiga | |
| F | 35 | Olli Nikupeteri | (Sweden) Luleå | (Sweden) J20 SuperElit | |
| F | 37 | Joakim Kemell | (Finland) JYP | (Finland) Liiga | Nashville Predators |

=== Germany ===
- Head coach: (Germany) Tobias Abstreiter

| Pos. | No. | Player | Team | League | NHL Rights |
|---|---|---|---|---|---|
| G | 29 | Florian Bugl | (Austria) Red Bull Hockey Juniors | (Austria) AlpsHL | |
| G | 30 | Nikita Quapp | (Germany) Krefeld Pinguine | (Germany) DEL | Carolina Hurricanes |
| D | 4 | Maksymilian Szuber | (Germany) EHC Red Bull München | (Germany) DEL | Arizona Coyotes |
| D | 15 | Luca Münzenberger | (United States) University of Vermont | (United States) NCAA | Edmonton Oilers |
| D | 16 | Arkadiusz Dziambor | (Germany) Adler Mannheim | (Germany) DEL | |
| D | 17 | Fabrizio Pilu | (Germany) Nürnberg Ice Tigers | (Germany) DEL | |
| D | 22 | Maximilian Glötzl | (Germany) Kölner Haie | (Germany) DEL | |
| D | 28 | Adrian Klein | (Germany) Straubing Tigers | (Germany) DEL | |
| F | 7 | Florian Elias [C] | (Germany) Adler Mannheim | (Germany) DEL | |
| F | 8 | Joshua Samanski | (Germany) Straubing Tigers | (Germany) DEL | |
| F | 9 | Justin Volek | (Germany) Krefeld Pinguine | (Germany) DEL | |
| F | 10 | Danjo Leonhardt | (Austria) EC Red Bull Salzburg | (Austria) ICEHL | |
| F | 12 | Maciej Rutkowski | (Germany) Krefeld Pinguine | (Germany) DEL | |
| F | 13 | Noah Dunham | (Germany) Heilbronner Falken | (Germany) DEL2 | |
| F | 18 | Josef Eham | (Austria) Red Bull Hockey Juniors | (Austria) AlpsHL | |
| F | 19 | Jussi Petersen | (Germany) Dresdner Eislöwen | (Germany) DEL2 | |
| F | 20 | Jakub Borzecki | (Austria) EC Red Bull Salzburg | (Austria) ICEHL | |
| F | 23 | Thomas Heigl | (Austria) Red Bull Hockey Juniors | (Austria) AlpsHL | |
| F | 24 | Alexander Blank | (Germany) Krefeld Pinguine | (Germany) DEL | |
| F | 27 | Bennet Roßmy | (Germany) Eisbären Berlin | (Germany) DEL | |

== Group B ==
=== Russia ===
- Head coach: (Russia) Sergei Zubov

| Pos. | No. | Player | Team | League | NHL Rights |
|---|---|---|---|---|---|
| G | 1 | Maxim Motorygin | (Russia) CSK VVS Samara | (Russia) VHL | |
| G | 29 | Yegor Guskov | (Russia) Loko Yaroslavl | (Russia) MHL | |
| G | 30 | Yaroslav Askarov | (Russia) SKA Saint Petersburg | (Russia) KHL | Nashville Predators |
| D | 2 | Vladimir Grudinin | (Russia) Krasnaya Armiya | (Russia) MHL | Carolina Hurricanes |
| D | 6 | Kirill Steklov | (Russia) Vityaz Podolsk | (Russia) KHL | |
| D | 7 | Arseni Koromyslov | (Russia) SKA-1946 | (Russia) MHL | St. Louis Blues |
| D | 12 | Nikita Smirnov | (Russia) SKA-Neva | (Russia) VHL | |
| D | 14 | Nikita Novikov | (Russia) Dynamo Moscow | (Russia) KHL | Buffalo Sabres |
| D | 20 | Kirill Kirsanov | (Russia) SKA Saint Petersburg | (Russia) KHL | Los Angeles Kings |
| D | 25 | Yegor Savikov | (Russia) Spartak Moscow | (Russia) KHL | |
| D | 27 | Shakir Mukhamadullin | (Russia) Salavat Yulaev Ufa | (Russia) KHL | New Jersey Devils |
| F | 8 | Ivan Didkovsky | (Russia) MHC Dynamo Moscow | (Russia) MHL | |
| F | 9 | Fedor Svechkov | (Russia) SKA Saint Petersburg | (Russia) KHL | Nashville Predators |
| F | 11 | Ivan Zinchenko | (Russia) Vityaz Podolsk | (Russia) KHL | |
| F | 13 | Vasili Ponomarev | (Russia) Spartak Moscow | (Russia) KHL | Carolina Hurricanes |
| F | 16 | Semyon Demidov | (Russia) Vityaz Podolsk | (Russia) KHL | |
| F | 17 | Matvei Michkov | (Russia) SKA Saint Petersburg | (Russia) KHL | Eligible 2023 |
| F | 18 | Pavel Tyutnev | (Russia) Loko Yaroslavl | (Russia) MHL | |
| F | 19 | Nikita Chibrikov | (Russia) SKA Saint Petersburg | (Russia) KHL | Winnipeg Jets |
| F | 21 | Nikita Guslistov | (Russia) Severstal Cherepovets | (Russia) KHL | Carolina Hurricanes |
| F | 22 | Marat Khusnutdinov | (Russia) SKA Saint Petersburg | (Russia) KHL | Minnesota Wild |
| F | 23 | Dmitri Zlodeyev | (Russia) MHC Dynamo Moscow | (Russia) MHL | Vancouver Canucks |
| F | 24 | Danila Yurov | (Russia) Metallurg Magnitogorsk | (Russia) KHL | Minnesota Wild |
| F | 26 | Kirill Tankov | (Russia) SKA-Neva | (Russia) VHL | Pittsburgh Penguins |
| F | 28 | Alexander Pashin | (Russia) Toros Neftekamsk | (Russia) VHL | Carolina Hurricanes |

=== Slovakia ===
- Head coach: (Slovakia) Ivan Feneš

| Pos. | No. | Player | Team | League | NHL Rights |
|---|---|---|---|---|---|
| G | 1 | Tomáš Boľo | (United States) St. Cloud Norsemen | (United States) NAHL | |
| G | 2 | Rastislav Eliaš | (United States) Green Bay Gamblers | (United States) USHL | |
| G | 30 | Simon Latkóczy | (United States) Madison Capitols | (United States) USHL | |
| D | 3 | Šimon Bečár | (United States) Chicago Steel | (United States) USHL | |
| D | 4 | Maxim Štrbák | (Finland) Jokerit | (Russia) KHL | Eligible 2023 |
| D | 5 | Denis Bakala | (Slovakia) HC 21 Prešov | (Slovakia) Slovak Extraliga | |
| D | 6 | Jozef Kmec | (Canada) Prince George Cougars | (Canada) WHL | |
| D | 7 | Rayen Petrovický | (Finland) TUTO Hockey | (Finland) Mestis | |
| D | 12 | Samuel Kňažko [C] | (United States) Seattle Thunderbirds | (Canada) WHL | Columbus Blue Jackets |
| D | 16 | Marko Stacha | (Canada) Kamloops Blazers | (Canada) WHL | |
| D | 17 | Šimon Nemec [A] | (Slovakia) HK Nitra | (Slovakia) Slovak Extraliga | New Jersey Devils |
| F | 8 | Martin Chromiak | (Canada) Kingston Frontenacs | (Canada) OHL | Los Angeles Kings |
| F | 9 | Roman Faith [A] | (Slovakia) HK Dukla Michalovce | (Slovakia) Slovak Extraliga | |
| F | 10 | Oleksii Myklukha | (Canada) Blainville-Boisbriand Armada | (Canada) QMJHL | |
| F | 11 | Matej Kašlík | (Canada) Chicoutimi Saguenéens | (Canada) QMJHL | |
| F | 13 | Ján Lašák | (United States) Janesville Jets | (United States) NAHL | |
| F | 14 | Maroš Jedlička | (Slovakia) HKM Zvolen | (Slovakia) Slovak Extraliga | |
| F | 15 | Dalibor Dvorský | (Sweden) AIK | (Sweden) HockeyAllsvenskan | Eligible 2023 |
| F | 18 | Servác Petrovský | (Canada) Owen Sound Attack | (Canada) OHL | Minnesota Wild |
| F | 19 | Jakub Demek | (Canada) Edmonton Oil Kings | (Canada) WHL | Vegas Golden Knights |
| F | 20 | Juraj Slafkovský | (Finland) TPS | (Finland) Liiga | Montreal Canadiens |
| F | 21 | Filip Mešár | (Slovakia) HK Poprad | (Slovakia) Slovak Extraliga | Montreal Canadiens |
| F | 23 | Adam Sýkora | (Slovakia) HK Nitra | (Slovakia) Slovak Extraliga | New York Rangers |
| F | 24 | Pavol Štetka | (Czech Republic) Dynamo Pardubice | (Czech Republic) Czech Extraliga | |
| F | 26 | Samuel Krajč | (Slovakia) HK Dukla Trenčín | (Slovakia) Slovak Extraliga | |

=== Sweden ===
- Head coach: (Sweden) Tomas Montén

| Pos. | No. | Player | Team | League | NHL Rights |
|---|---|---|---|---|---|
| G | 1 | Jesper Wallstedt | (Sweden) Luleå HF | (Sweden) SHL | Minnesota Wild |
| G | 30 | Calle Clang | (Sweden) Rögle BK | (Sweden) SHL | Pittsburgh Penguins |
| G | 35 | Carl Lindbom | (Sweden) Djurgårdens IF | (Sweden) SHL | Vegas Golden Knights |
| D | 3 | Helge Grans | (United States) Ontario Reign | (United States) AHL | Los Angeles Kings |
| D | 4 | Emil Andrae [C] | (Sweden) HV71 | (Sweden) HockeyAllsvenskan | Philadelphia Flyers |
| D | 5 | Anton Olsson | (Sweden) Malmö Redhawks | (Sweden) SHL | Nashville Predators |
| D | 6 | Måns Forsfjäll | (Sweden) Skellefteå AIK | (Sweden) SHL | |
| D | 7 | Simon Edvinsson [A] | (Sweden) Frölunda HC | (Sweden) SHL | Detroit Red Wings |
| D | 8 | Leo Lööf | (Finland) Ilves | (Finland) Liiga | St. Louis Blues |
| D | 12 | Ludvig Jansson | (Sweden) Södertälje SK | (Sweden) HockeyAllsvenskan | Florida Panthers |
| D | 22 | William Wallinder | (Sweden) Rögle BK | (Sweden) SHL | Detroit Red Wings |
| F | 9 | Daniel Ljungman | (Sweden) Linköping HC | (Sweden) SHL | Dallas Stars |
| F | 11 | Fabian Lysell | (Canada) Vancouver Giants | (Canada) WHL | Boston Bruins |
| F | 15 | Åke Stakkestad | (Sweden) BIK Karlskoga | (Sweden) HockeyAllsvenskan | |
| F | 18 | Linus Sjödin | (Sweden) Rögle BK | (Sweden) SHL | Buffalo Sabres |
| F | 19 | Victor Stjernborg | (Sweden) Växjö Lakers | (Sweden) SHL | Chicago Blackhawks |
| F | 20 | Albert Sjöberg | (Sweden) Södertälje SK | (Sweden) HockeyAllsvenskan | Dallas Stars |
| F | 21 | Oskar Olausson | (Canada) Barrie Colts | (Canada) OHL | Colorado Avalanche |
| F | 23 | Isak Rosén | (Sweden) Leksands IF | (Sweden) SHL | Buffalo Sabres |
| F | 24 | Jonathan Lekkerimäki | (Sweden) Djurgårdens IF | (Sweden) SHL | Vancouver Canucks |
| F | 25 | Liam Öhgren | (Sweden) Djurgårdens IF | (Sweden) SHL | Minnesota Wild |
| F | 27 | Theodor Niederbach | (Sweden) Frölunda HC | (Sweden) SHL | Detroit Red Wings |
| F | 28 | Oskar Magnusson | (Sweden) AIK | (Sweden) HockeyAllsvenskan | Washington Capitals |
| F | 29 | Daniel Torgersson | (Sweden) AIK | (Sweden) HockeyAllsvenskan | Winnipeg Jets |

=== Switzerland ===
- Head coach: (Switzerland) Marco Bayer

| Pos. | No. | Player | Team | League | NHL Rights |
|---|---|---|---|---|---|
| G | 30 | Loic Galley | (Switzerland) Gottéron U20 | (Switzerland) U20-Elit | |
| G | 29 | Kevin Pasche | (United States) Omaha Lancers | (United States) USHL | |
| G | 1 | Noah Patenaude | (Canada) Saint John Sea Dogs | (Canada) QMJHL | |
| D | 2 | Lian Bichsel | (Sweden) Leksands IF | (Sweden) SHL | Dallas Stars |
| D | 3 | Noah Delémont | (Switzerland) EHC Biel | (Switzerland) NL | |
| D | 4 | Vincent Despont | (Canada) Saint John Sea Dogs | (Canada) QMJHL | |
| D | 5 | Noah Meier | (Switzerland) GCK Lions | (Switzerland) SL | |
| D | 6 | Arno Nussbaumer | (Switzerland) EVZ Academy | (Switzerland) SL | |
| D | 7 | Dario Sidler | (Switzerland) EVZ Academy | (Switzerland) SL | |
| D | 8 | Maximilian Streule | (Canada) Winnipeg Ice | (Canada) WHL | |
| D | 9 | Brian Zanetti | (Canada) Peterborough Petes | (Canada) OHL | Philadelphia Flyers |
| F | 10 | Dario Allenspach | (Switzerland) EV Zug | (Switzerland) NL | |
| F | 11 | Attilio Biasca | (Canada) Halifax Mooseheads | (Canada) QMJHL | |
| F | 12 | Lorenzo Canonica | (Canada) Shawinigan Cataractes | (Canada) QMJHL | |
| F | 13 | Christophe Cavalleri | (Switzerland) Genève-Servette HC | (Switzerland) NL | |
| F | 14 | Keanu Derungs | (Canada) Victoria Royals | (Canada) WHL | |
| F | 15 | Joshua Fahrni | (Switzerland) SC Bern | (Switzerland) NL | |
| F | 16 | Ray Fust | (United States) Sioux Falls Stampede | (United States) USHL | |
| F | 17 | Lilian Garessus | (Switzerland) EHC Biel | (Switzerland) NL | |
| F | 18 | Marlon Graf | (Switzerland) GCK Lions | (Switzerland) SL | |
| F | 19 | Joel Henry | (Switzerland) GCK Lions | (Switzerland) SL | |
| F | 20 | Valentin Hofer | (Switzerland) EV Zug | (Switzerland) NL | |
| F | 21 | Simon Knak | (Switzerland) HC Davos | (Switzerland) NL | Nashville Predators |
| F | 22 | Fabian Ritzmann | (Switzerland) HCB Ticino Rockets | (Switzerland) SL | |
| F | 23 | Louis Robin | (Canada) Rimouski Océanic | (Canada) QMJHL | |

=== United States ===
- Head coach: (United States) Nate Leaman

| Pos. | No. | Player | Team | League | NHL Rights |
|---|---|---|---|---|---|
| G | 1 | Remington Keopple | (United States) Des Moines Buccaneers | (United States) USHL | |
| G | 29 | Andrew Oke | (United States) Saginaw Spirit | (Canada) OHL | |
| G | 30 | Kaidan Mbereko | (United States) Lincoln Stars | (United States) USHL | |
| D | 2 | Ian Moore | (United States) Harvard University | (United States) NCAA | Anaheim Ducks |
| D | 3 | Sean Behrens | (United States) University of Denver | (United States) NCAA | Colorado Avalanche |
| D | 5 | Wyatt Kaiser | (United States) University of Minnesota Duluth | (United States) NCAA | Chicago Blackhawks |
| D | 14 | Brock Faber [A] | (United States) University of Minnesota | (United States) NCAA | Los Angeles Kings |
| D | 17 | Jacob Truscott | (United States) University of Michigan | (United States) NCAA | Vancouver Canucks |
| D | 25 | Tyler Kleven | (United States) University of North Dakota | (United States) NCAA | Ottawa Senators |
| D | 28 | Jack Peart | (United States) St. Cloud State University | (United States) NCAA | Minnesota Wild |
| D | 43 | Luke Hughes | (United States) University of Michigan | (United States) NCAA | New Jersey Devils |
| F | 8 | Riley Duran | (United States) Providence College | (United States) NCAA | Boston Bruins |
| F | 9 | Thomas Bordeleau | (United States) San Jose Sharks | (United States) NHL | San Jose Sharks |
| F | 11 | Mackie Samoskevich | (United States) University of Michigan | (United States) NCAA | Florida Panthers |
| F | 12 | Sasha Pastujov | (Canada) Guelph Storm | (Canada) OHL | Anaheim Ducks |
| F | 15 | Matthew Coronato | (United States) Harvard University | (United States) NCAA | Calgary Flames |
| F | 16 | Dominic James | (United States) University of Minnesota Duluth | (United States) NCAA | Chicago Blackhawks |
| F | 18 | Logan Cooley | United States NTDP | (United States) USHL | Arizona Coyotes |
| F | 19 | Landon Slaggert [A] | (United States) University of Notre Dame | (United States) NCAA | Chicago Blackhawks |
| F | 20 | Redmond Savage | (United States) Miami University | (United States) NCAA | Detroit Red Wings |
| F | 21 | Brett Berard | (United States) Providence College | (United States) NCAA | New York Rangers |
| F | 23 | Charlie Stramel | United States NTDP | (United States) USHL | |
| F | 26 | Hunter McKown | (United States) Colorado College | (United States) NCAA | |
| F | 34 | Carter Mazur | (United States) University of Denver | (United States) NCAA | Detroit Red Wings |
| F | 89 | Matthew Knies | (United States) University of Minnesota | (United States) NCAA | Toronto Maple Leafs |
