= Kaiden Guhle =

Canadian ice hockey player (born 2002)

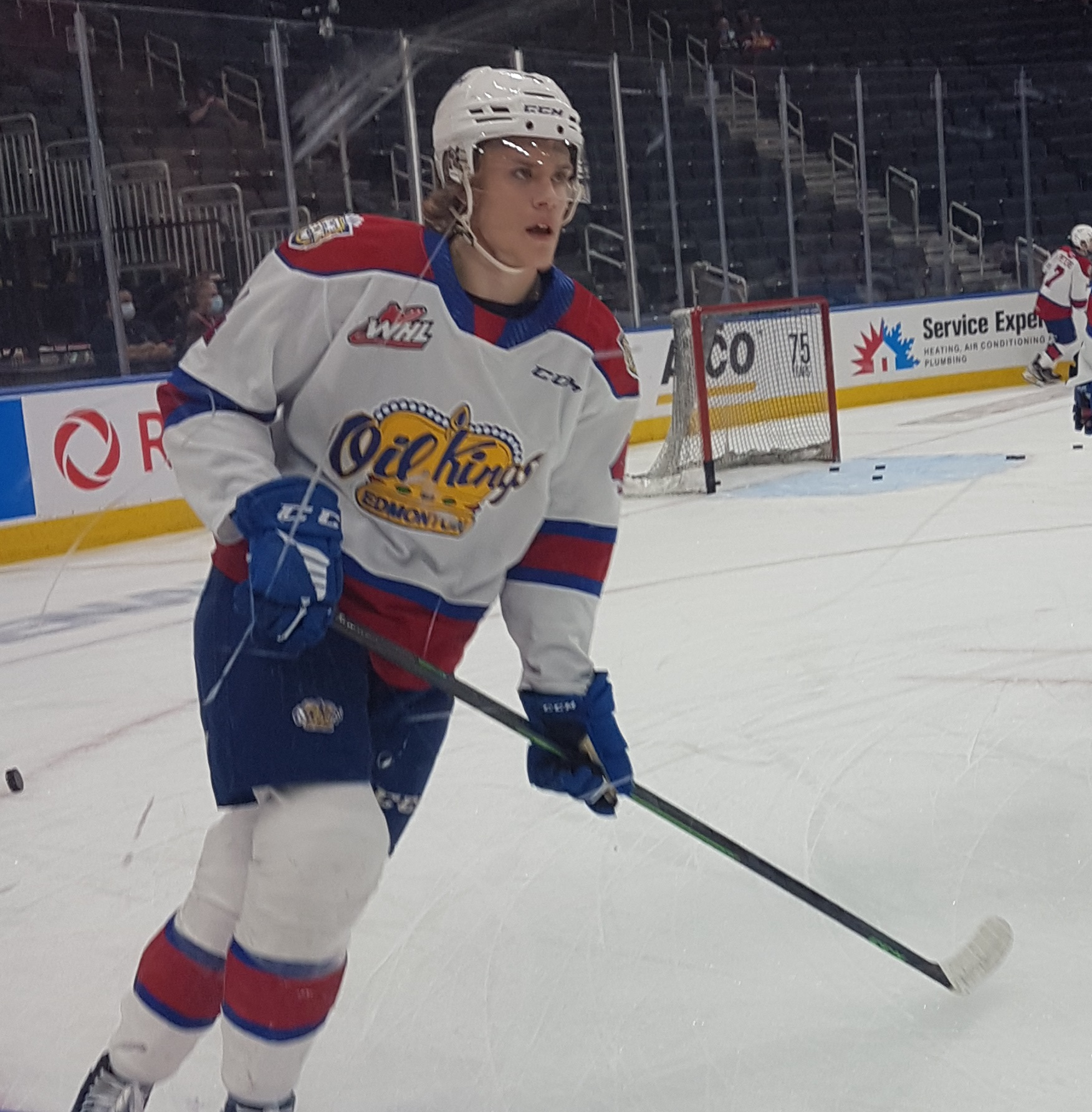
- Guhle with the Edmonton Oil Kings in 2022
- Born: January 18, 2002 (age 24) Sherwood Park, Alberta, Canada
- Height: 6 ft 3 in (191 cm)
- Weight: 202 lb (92 kg; 14 st 6 lb)
- Position: Defence
- Shoots: Left
- NHL team: Montreal Canadiens
- National team: Canada
- NHL draft: 16th overall, 2020; Montreal Canadiens
- Playing career: 2021–present

Kaiden Guhle (/ˈɡuːliː/ GOO-lee; born January 18, 2002) is a Canadian professional ice hockey player who is a defenceman for the Montreal Canadiens of the National Hockey League (NHL). He was selected in the first round, 16th overall, by the Canadiens in the 2020 NHL entry draft.

== Early life ==
Guhle was born in Sherwood Park, Alberta, to parents Carrianne and Mark. An athletic family overall, his mother was a former figure skater while his father played basketball. As a result, both Guhle and his older brother Brendan began power skating at a young age.

== Playing career ==
=== Junior ===
==== Prince Albert Raiders (2017–2021) ====
Guhle was selected with the first overall pick in the 2017 Western Hockey League (WHL) bantam draft by the Prince Albert Raiders. In his first full WHL season with the Raiders, the team won Ed Chynoweth Cup as league champions. They subsequently played as part of the 2019 Memorial Cup but did not advance out of the round-robin. During the 2019–20 season, he amassed 40 points in 64 games. On October 6, 2020, Guhle was selected by the Montreal Canadiens in the first round (16th overall) at the 2020 NHL entry draft. Thereafter, he signed a three-year, entry-level contract with the team.

With the COVID-19 pandemic resulting in the 2020–21 WHL season being delayed, Guhle was temporarily loaned to the Brooks Bandits of the Alberta Junior Hockey League (AJHL) before joining camp for the Canadian junior national team in late December 2020. He then skated in three games with Montreal's American Hockey League (AHL) affiliate, the Laval Rocket and would be limited to just two appearances with the Raiders once major junior play commenced due to a hand-injury.

Making a strong impression at the Canadiens' training camp prior to the 2021–22 NHL season, head coach Dominique Ducharme seriously weighed retaining Guhle in the lineup, though noting it would not make sense to do so unless there was a regular place for him in the top six. Upon reflection, Guhle himself said that he had not expected to still be in consideration a day before the roster announcement. He would ultimately return to Prince Albert for the 2021–22 season, registering fifteen points through 17 games before being traded to the Edmonton Oil Kings on December 1.

==== Edmonton Oil Kings (2021–22) ====
Acquired as part of the Oil Kings' bid to challenge the Winnipeg Ice for the WHL championship title, Guhle recorded five goals and twenty assists through 25 games with his newfound team, and was named the WHL Central Division's defenceman of the year. After missing the final weeks of the regular season due to injury, he returned for the first game of the 2022 WHL playoffs, and scored three goals and two assists in the Oil Kings' opening round sweep of the Lethbridge Hurricanes. After likewise sweeping the Red Deer Rebels in the second round, the Oil Kings would advance to the WHL Finals after defeating Winnipeg in five games. For his part, Guhle scored two goals and an assist in the series-clinching win. Winning the championship series over the Seattle Thunderbirds, Guhle captured the second Chynoweth Cup of his major junior career. He was named the WHL Playoff Most Valuable Player at the conclusion of the series, setting a team record for most goals by a defenceman in a single postseason (8). At the ensuing Memorial Cup tournament, the Oil Kings once again did not advance past the round-robin.

=== Professional ===
==== Montreal Canadiens (2022–present) ====
Following the conclusion of the 2022 Memorial Cup, Guhle began to rehabilitate a lower-body injury that he had been playing through during the playoff run. As a result of this, he did not participate in the team's development camp in July. He said that he "wanted to make sure that I was ready because there's a long season coming up. Hopefully, my first professional season." After his performance across pre-season action, Guhle was widely considered one of the most impressive young players in the Canadiens system and was a perceived frontrunner to make the team's defensive lineup. On October 10, 2022, it was confirmed that Guhle had made the Canadiens' opening night roster for the 2022–23 season. In his NHL debut on October 12, Guhle played a team-leading 22:34 minutes of ice time in a 4–3 victory over the Toronto Maple Leafs. With injuries to the team's more senior left-side defencemen Mike Matheson and Joel Edmundson, Guhle continued to play top-line minutes for the Canadiens. He recorded his first NHL points, both assists, in a 3–2 victory over the Pittsburgh Penguins on October 17, and was named the second star of the game. Guhle scored his first NHL goal ten days later in an 3–2 victory over the Buffalo Sabres, helping the team to its first road victory of the season. In late 2022, after sustaining a knee injury in a game versus the Florida Panthers where he collided with Panthers forward Aleksander Barkov, it was announced that Guhle would miss at least two months of the remaining schedule. In his return to the team on February 28, 2023, Guhle scored a goal in a 3–1 win over the San Jose Sharks. After missing additional games due to a shoulder injury in early March, he would be sidelined yet again due to a high ankle sprain, effectively ending his season outright.

Guhle spent most of the 2023–24 season playing on the Canadiens' top pair alongside Mike Matheson, which necessitated a move to the right side, a position where the team had less depth than its counterpart. Speaking on the adjustment, he remarked that there had been "a lot of games, a lot of reps. You get more comfortable every game. Still working on a lot of stuff and still a lot of stuff I need to learn on that side of the ice." On February 29, 2024, Guhle appeared in his 100th career NHL game. A month later, he was assessed a one-game suspension after slashing Philadelphia Flyers forward Travis Konecny from the bench the night prior, which he attributed to Konecny having hit Canadiens teammate Juraj Slafkovský shortly beforehand, saying "I wasn't trying to injure him. I was more just trying to steer him away." Guhle then exited an April 4 game against the Tampa Bay Lightning after being hit against the boards by Nikita Kucherov. Sustaining a head injury as a result, he missed the final two weeks of the season. Collectively, Guhle totaled six goals and 16 assists in 70 games played.

Entering the 2024–25 season on the final year of his entry-level contract with the Canadiens, Guhle signed a six-year, $33.3 million extension with the team on July 31, 2024. Shortly thereafter, it was announced that he had undergone an appendectomy procedure in late September, however he ultimately did not miss any playing time. Tallying four goals and 14 points through 43 games, Guhle would suffer a lower-body injury on January 28, 2025 versus the Winnipeg Jets, exiting the game as a result. The following day, it was announced that he required surgery to repair a lacerated quadriceps muscle, sidelining him for an indefinite period. After a 21-game absence, Guhle returned to the lineup on March 28 against the Carolina Hurricanes. Regarding the cut to his quadriceps, he remarked that "for what happened, it was the best-case scenario — didn't hit any nerves or arteries." Guhle scored two goals, including the game-winner, in the team's 4–2 victory over the Carolina Hurricanes in its final game of the regular season on April 16, clinching a berth in the Stanley Cup playoffs for the first time in four years.

In the early stages of the 2025–26 season, Guhle collected two points through his team's first five games before suffering a lower-body injury during a game against the Nashville Predators on October 16. After being out of the lineup for almost a month, he elected to have surgery on November 13 to repair a partially torn adductor muscle. He returned to the roster on January 10, and ultimately appeared in 39 games during the regular season, with two goals and nine assists. The season was a major success for the Canadiens, who finished sixth in the NHL, qualifying for the Stanley Cup playoffs for the second consecutive year and facing the Tampa Bay Lightning in the first round. Guhle registered his first NHL playoff point on April 26, assisting on a goal by Zachary Bolduc. He assisted on both Canadiens goals in their series-clinching victory over the Lightning in Game 7. The Canadiens went on an unexpectedly deep playoff run, reaching the Eastern Conference Final against the Carolina Hurricanes. Guhle reinjured his adductor muscle in the fourth game of the series, but played through it in the fifth and final game, which saw the Canadiens ousted.

Following the end of the 2026 playoffs, Guhle indicated that he did not expect his injury to require surgery. However, he ultimately opted to undergo another adductor surgery in August 2026, and it was announced that he would miss the first four to five weeks of the 2026–27 season. He made his season debut on October 10, the Canadiens' sixth game of the season.

== International play ==
Medal record

Men's ice hockey

Representing Canada

World Junior Championships
Silver medal – second place	2021 Canada	

Hlinka Gretzky Cup
Silver medal – second place	2019 Slovakia/Czech Republic	

In November 2018, Guhle was named captain of team Canada Red at the annual World U-17 Hockey Challenge. Thereafter, he was selected to the national junior team for the 2021 World Junior Championships. He finished the tournament with two goals and an assist in seven games whereas his country earned a silver medal following a loss to the United States. The following year, Guhle was named captain of the Canadian roster. After playing two games, the tournament was cancelled as a result of Omicron variant spread; Guhle said it was a disappointment given it being his final year of eligibility. While play was later rescheduled for the summer, he was unable to participate due to injury.

In the aftermath of the 2023–24 NHL campaign, Guhle indicated that he had been invited to join the national senior team for the 2024 IIHF World Championship, and would compete if he was able to sufficiently recover from a head injury in time. He would ultimately appear in nine games for Canada at the tournament, where he produced five points (1G, 4A) before being sidelined prior to the bronze medal game due to an injury sustained in the semifinals matchup versus Switzerland.

== Career statistics ==
=== Regular season and playoffs ===
			Regular season					Playoffs
Season	Team	League	GP	G	A	Pts	PIM	GP	G	A	Pts	PIM
2017–18	Prince Albert Raiders	WHL	8	0	1	1	4	—	—	—	—	—
2018–19	Prince Albert Raiders	WHL	65	3	14	17	40	23	0	3	3	8
2019–20	Prince Albert Raiders	WHL	64	11	29	40	56	—	—	—	—	—
2020–21	Laval Rocket	AHL	3	0	0	0	0	—	—	—	—	—
2020–21	Prince Albert Raiders	WHL	2	1	1	2	0	—	—	—	—	—
2021–22	Prince Albert Raiders	WHL	17	2	13	15	28	—	—	—	—	—
2021–22	Edmonton Oil Kings	WHL	25	5	20	25	29	19	8	8	16	10
2022–23	Montreal Canadiens	NHL	44	4	14	18	27	—	—	—	—	—
2023–24	Montreal Canadiens	NHL	70	6	16	22	56	—	—	—	—	—
2024–25	Montreal Canadiens	NHL	55	6	12	18	47	5	0	0	0	4
2025–26	Montreal Canadiens	NHL	39	2	9	11	41	19	0	8	8	6
NHL totals			208	18	51	69	171	24	0	8	8	50

=== International ===
Year	Team	Event	Result	GP	G	A	Pts	PIM
2018	Canada Red	U17	4th	6	0	3	3	12
2019	Canada	HG18	2nd place, silver medalist(s)	5	0	1	1	12
2021	Canada	WJC	2nd place, silver medalist(s)	7	2	1	3	4
2024	Canada	WC	4th	9	1	4	5	2
Junior totals				18	2	5	7	28
Senior totals				9	1	4	5	2

== Awards and honours ==
Award	Year	Ref
CHL
CHL/NHL Top Prospects Game	2020	
WHL
Ed Chynoweth Cup champion	2019, 2022	
Central Division Defenceman of the Year	2022	
Central Division First All-Star Team	2022	
WHL Playoff MVP	2022	

Awards and achievements
Preceded by Cole Caufield	Montreal Canadiens first-round draft pick 2020	Succeeded by Logan Mailloux
