= Archbishop Jordan High School =

Location
- 4001 Emerald Drive; Sherwood Park, Alberta, T8H 0P5; Canada; 53°33′59″N 113°17′14″W

Information
- Motto: scri crui crediti (I know in whom I place my confidence)
- Religious affiliation: Catholic
- Established: 1969
- Grades: 9-12
- Age: 14 to 18
- Enrollment: 243 (2018/9)
- Website: archbishopjordan.eics.ab.ca

Archbishop Jordan High School is an academic Catholic secondary school located in Sherwood Park, Alberta, Canada. It was founded in 1969 and is named after Archbishop Anthony Jordan. The school motto - scri crui crediti - is based on Jordan's motto; scio crui crediti and the school football team, the Scots, is named after Jordan's Scottish birthplace.

The school was originally located on the corner of Brentwood Blvd and Oak Street. In 2013 a new larger building, accommodating up to 1,400 students, was built, and the old building was repurposed as a middle school. The new location is in Emerald Hill subdivision.

The new larger building has allowed the school to offer a wider variety of course, including Cosmetics, Dance, foods courses and design classes.

There are multiple sports teams students can join such as a football team, soccer team, rugby team, swimming team and more.

Archbishop Jordan students participate in many competitive sports events, in particular soccer and handball. Other school events are: Dramatic productions, ABJ talent show, The Scots nominees, and the Ultimate Scavenger Hunt.

As of 2017, the Emerald Hills Leisure Center opened just adjacent to the school, providing students with the opportunity to join swimming teams and do something in their spare time.

ABJ is also home to a French Language Arts program that includes Math, Social studies and French classes. This provides students with a French background, or new students who wish to learn the basics of the language, the opportunity to do so with qualified teachers who care about their students.
