= 2008–09 QMJHL season =

- League: Quebec Major Junior Hockey League
- Sport: Hockey
- Duration: Preseason; Regular season Sept. 11, 2008 – Mar. 15, 2009; Playoffs; Mar. 20, 2009 – May 12, 2009
- Teams: 18

Draft
- Top draft pick: Brandon Gormley
- Picked by: Moncton Wildcats

Regular season
- Jean Rougeau Trophy: Drummondville Voltigeurs (1)
- Season MVP: Nicola Riopel (Moncton Wildcats)
- Top scorer: Yannick Riendeau (Drummondville Voltigeurs)

Playoffs
- Playoffs MVP: Yannick Riendeau (Voltigeurs)
- Finals champions: Drummondville Voltigeurs (1)
- Runners-up: Shawinigan Cataractes

QMJHL seasons
- 2007–08 2009–10

2008–09 CHL season
- League: Canadian Hockey League
- Sport: Hockey
- Duration: OHL; Sept. 17, 2008 – Mar. 15, 2009; QMJHL; Sept. 11, 2008 – Mar. 15, 2009; WHL; Sept. 18, 2008 – Mar. 15, 2009
- Teams: 60
- TV partner(s): RDS; Rogers Sportsnet; Rogers TV; Shaw TV
- Season MVP: Cody Hodgson (Brampton Battalion) (OHL)
- Top scorer: Yannick Riendeau (Drummondville Voltigeurs) (QMJHL)

Memorial Cup
- Finals champions: Windsor Spitfires (OHL) (1st title)
- Runners-up: Kelowna Rockets (WHL)

The 2008–09 QMJHL season was the 40th season of the Quebec Major Junior Hockey League (QMJHL). The regular season began on September 11, 2008, and ended on March 15, 2009. The 2008 ADT Canada Russia Challenge series, featuring Team QMJHL versus the Russian Selects, took place on November 17 and 19, 2008. Eighteen teams played 68 games each. The Drummondville Voltigeurs, who finished first overall in the regular season, went on to capture their first President's Cup vs. the Shawinigan Cataractes in a series they won 4–3.

== Team changes ==
- The St. John's Fog Devils relocated to Verdun, Quebec, and are rename the Montreal Junior Hockey Club, and move from the Atlantic Division to the Telus West.
- The league switch from 2 division to 4. All 6 Maritime teams play in the Atlantic Division and all Quebec teams and the Lewiston Maineiacs are split into 3 Divisions Telus East, Telus Central, Telus West.

== Notable dates ==
Offseason

- June 20–21, 2008—27 QMJHL players were selected in the 2008 NHL entry draft.

Regular season

- November 17, 2008–Team QMJHL defeats the Russian Selects 5–3 in Game 1 of the ADT Canada-Russia Challenge held in Sydney, Nova Scotia.
- November 19, 2008–Team QMJHL defeated by Russian Selects 4–3 in Game 2 of the ADT Canada-Russia Challenge held in Saint John, New Brunswick

Playoffs

== Standings ==
=== Division Standings ===
Note: GP = Games played; W = Wins; L = Losses; OTL = Overtime losses; SL - Shootout losses; GF = Goals for; GA = Goals against; Pts = Points

Division Telus Centre	GP	W	L	OTL	SL	GF	GA	Pts
Drummondville Voltigeurs z	68	54	10	0	4	345	189	112
Shawinigan Cataractes x	68	51	14	3	0	308	183	105
Victoriaville Tigres x	68	32	32	2	2	219	249	68
Lewiston Maineiacs x	68	22	43	1	2	190	286	47

Division Telus Est	GP	W	L	OTL	SL	GF	GA	Pts
Québec Remparts z	68	49	16	0	3	282	184	101
Rimouski Océanic x	68	44	23	1	0	267	223	89
Chicoutimi Saguenéens x	68	24	32	4	8	215	256	60
Baie-Comeau Drakkar x	68	22	37	7	2	206	297	53

Division Atlantique	GP	W	L	OTL	SL	GF	GA	Pts
Moncton Wildcats z	68	48	14	2	4	236	149	102
Cape Breton Screaming Eagles x	68	46	18	3	1	252	201	96
Saint John Sea Dogs x	68	34	30	2	2	222	232	72
P.E.I. Rocket x	68	26	32	5	5	229	243	62
Acadie-Bathurst Titan x	68	20	35	7	6	187	256	53
Halifax Mooseheads	68	19	41	3	5	193	290	46

Division Telus Ouest	GP	W	L	OTL	SL	GF	GA	Pts
Gatineau Olympiques z	68	38	25	2	3	232	232	81
Montreal Junior Hockey Club x	68	34	30	2	2	211	202	72
Rouyn-Noranda Huskies x	68	30	30	5	3	210	245	68
Val-d'Or Foreurs	68	19	41	3	5	206	293	46

=== Overall Standing ===
- determines standings for the second round of the playoffs.

Note: GP = Games played; W = Wins; L = Losses; OTL = Overtime losses; SL - Shootout losses; GF = Goals for; GA = Goals against; Pts = Points

Rank	Team	GP	W	L	OTL	SL	GF	GA	Pts
1	Drummondville Voltigeurs z	68	54	10	0	4	345	189	112
2	Moncton Wildcats z	68	48	14	2	4	236	149	102
3	Québec Remparts z	68	49	16	0	3	282	184	101
4	Gatineau Olympiques z	68	38	25	2	3	232	232	81
5	Shawinigan Cataractes x	68	51	14	3	0	308	183	105
6	Cape Breton Screaming Eagles x	68	46	18	3	1	252	201	96
7	Rimouski Océanic x	68	44	23	1	0	267	223	89
8	Montreal Junior Hockey Club x	68	34	30	2	2	211	202	72
9	Saint John Sea Dogs x	68	34	30	2	2	222	232	72
10	Victoriaville Tigres x	68	32	32	2	2	219	249	68
11	Rouyn-Noranda Huskies x	68	30	30	5	3	210	245	68
12	P.E.I. Rocket x	68	26	32	5	5	229	243	62
13	Chicoutimi Saguenéens x	68	24	32	4	8	215	256	60
14	Baie-Comeau Drakkar x	68	22	37	7	2	206	297	53
15	Acadie-Bathurst Titan x	68	20	35	7	6	187	256	53
16	Lewiston MAINEiacs x	68	22	43	1	2	190	286	47
17	Val-d'Or Foreurs	68	19	41	3	5	206	293	46
18	Halifax Mooseheads	68	19	41	3	5	193	290	46

x - team clinched QMJHL Playoff spot

z - team has clinched division

=== Scoring leaders ===
Note: GP = Games played; G = Goals; A = Assists; Pts = Points; PIM = Penalty minutes

Player	Team	GP	G	A	Pts	PIM
Yannick Riendeau	Drummondville Voltigeurs	64	58	68	126	31
Dany Massé	Drummondville Voltigeurs	68	44	66	110	52
Cedric Lalonde-McNicoll	Shawinigan Cataractes	65	38	66	104	22
Paul Byron	Gatineau Olympiques	65	33	66	99	32
Mike Hoffman	Drummondville Voltigeurs	62	52	42	94	86
Nick Petersen	Shawinigan Cataractes	68	37	53	90	42
Félix Petit	Baie-Comeau Drakkar	68	25	65	90	28
Matthew Pistilli	Shawinigan Cataractes	63	45	41	86	37
Alexandre Quesnel	Gatineau Olympiques	63	37	45	82	88
Robert Slaney	Cape Breton Screaming Eagles	63	36	45	81	78

=== Leading goaltenders ===
Note: GP = Games played; Min = Minutes played; W = Wins; L = Losses; SOL = Shootout losses; GA = Goals against; SO = Total shutouts; SV% = Save percentage; GAA = Goals against average

Player	Team	GP	Min	W	L	GA	SO	Sv%	GAA
Nicola Riopel	Moncton Wildcats	59	3487	43	15	117	5	.931	2.01
Charles Lavigne	Quebec Remparts	51	2839	34	13	112	6	.916	2.37
Gabriel Girard	Shawinigan Cataractes	30	1638	22	5	70	2	.895	2.57
Timo Pielmeier	Shawinigan Cataractes	43	2408	29	11	106	2	.914	2.64
Antoine Tardif	Drummondville Voltigeurs	43	2378	32	7	109	0	.893	2.75

== Players ==
=== 2008 QMJHL Entry Draft ===
First round

1. Moncton Wildcats Brandon Gormley (D)
2. Drummondville Voltigeurs Sean Couturier (C)
3. Victoriaville Tigres Brandon Hynes (RW)
4. Val-d'Or Foreurs Cedrick Henley (LW)
5. Prince Edward Island Rocket Ben Duffy (F)
6. Lewiston MAINEiacs Garrett Clarke (D)
7. Shawinigan Cataractes Michaël Bournival (C/LW)
8. Montréal Juniors Guillaume Asselin (RW)
9. Lewiston MAINEiacs Michael Chaput (C)
10. Québec Remparts Samuel Carrier (D)
11. Acadie-Bathurst Titan Vincent Arseneau (LW)
12. Cape Breton Screaming Eagles Logan Shaw (RW)
13. Moncton Wildcats Louis Domingue (G)
14. Lewiston MAINEiacs Étienne Brodeur (LW)
15. Val-d'Or Foreurs Alex Noël (RW)
16. Gatineau Olympiques Yoan Pinette (RW)
17. Acadie-Bathurst Titan Stefan Fournier (RW)
18. Drummondville Voltigeurs Jérôme Gauthier-Leduc (D)

=== 2008 NHL entry draft ===
In total, 27 QMJHL players were selected at the 2008 NHL entry draft.

=== Trades ===
Date	Deal made
January 8, 2009	To Shawinigan Cataractes Mathieu Bolduc	To Chicoutimi Saguenéens 1st round pick, 2011
January 8, 2009	To Montreal Juniors Philippe Fontaine	To Cape Breton Screaming Eagles 5th round pick, 2010
January 8, 2009	To Gatineau Olympiques Dave Nolin; John Esposito	To Victoriaville Tigres Bradley MacDonald; 2nd round pick, 2010
January 8, 2009	To Acadie-Bathurst Titan Artem Demkov	To Cape Breton Screaming Eagles 8th round pick, 2009
January 8, 2009	To Shawinigan Cataractes Nicolas Marcoux-Larocque	To Saint John Sea Dogs 5th round pick, 2009 (Halifax Mooseheads)
January 8, 2009	To Shawinigan Cataractes Maxime Macenauer	To Rouyn-Noranda Huskies Brad Yetman; 4th round pick, 2009
January 8, 2009	To Drummondville Voltigeurs Francis Schanck	To Rouyn-Noranda Huskies 10th round pick, 2009
January 8, 2009	To PEI Rocket Jarrad Struthers	To Rouyn-Noranda Huskies 2nd round pick, 2009 (Rouyn-Noranda Huskies); 3rd round pick, 2009 (Acadie-Bathurst Titan)
January 8, 2009	To Halifax Mooseheads Andrew Smith	To Chicoutimi Saguenéens 8th round pick, 2009
January 8, 2009	To Chicoutimi Saguenéens Louis Leblanc; Maxim Guérin; Marc-André Carré	To Val-d'Or Foreurs 3rd round pick, 2009; 9th round pick, 2009
January 8, 2009	To Moncton Wildcats Tomy Joly	To Acadie-Bathurst Titan Julien Tremblay; 2nd round pick, 2009 (Victoriaville Tigres); 2nd round pick, 2010
January 8, 2009	To Acadie-Bathurst Titan Jeremie Blain	To Victoriaville Tigres Olivier Jannard; 4th round pick, 2010; 5th round pick, 2010
January 8, 2009	To Baie-Comeau Drakkar Anthony Taylor	To Montreal Juniors Félix-Antoine Poulin
January 8, 2009	To Saint John Sea Dogs Olivier Ouellet	To Chicoutimi Saguenéens 2nd round pick, 2009 (Shawinigan Cataractes)
January 7, 2009	To Val-d'Or Foreurs Keven Charland-Guérette	To Saint John Sea Dogs 3rd round pick, 2009 (Halifax Mooseheads)
January 7, 2009	To Baie-Comeau Drakkar Nathan Dunnett; 7th round pick, 2009 (Rouyn-Noranda Huskies); 3rd round pick, 2010	To Drummondville Voltigeurs Marco Cousineau
January 7, 2009	To Gatineau Olympiques 3rd round pick, 2009	To Drummondville Voltigeurs 3rd round pick, 2010 (Drummondville Voltigeurs)
January 7, 2009	To Baie-Comeau Drakkar Jordan Bernier; Charles Vouligny	To Acadie-Bathurst Titan 5th round pick, 2009 (Acadie-Bathurst Titan)
January 7, 2009	To Baie-Comeau Drakkar François Lacerte; 4th round pick, 2009 (Lewiston Maineiacs)	To Rimouski Océanic Maxime Ouimet
January 7, 2009	To Victoriaville Tigres Tyler Noseworthy	To Moncton Wildcats 6th round pick, 2010
January 7, 2009	To Val-d'Or Foreurs Michel Kowalew	To Montreal Juniors 10th round pick, 2009
January 6, 2009	To Saint John Sea Dogs Mathieu Gingras; Simon Giroux; 1st round pick, 2009; 2nd round pick, 2010	To Drummondville Voltigeurs Christopher DiDomenico
January 5, 2009	To Cape Breton Screaming Eagles Brad Tesink	To Acadie-Bathurst Titan Olivier Dame-Malka
January 6, 2009	To Rimouski Océanic Marc-André Bourdon; Matthew Dopud; Justin MacNaughton	To Rouyn-Noranda Huskies 1st round pick, 2009 (Quebec Remparts); 2nd round pick, 2009; 3rd round pick, 2009 (Quebec Remparts); 7th round pick, 2009; 1st round pick, 2010; 4th round pick, 2010
January 5, 2009	To Halifax Mooseheads Pascal Amyot; 1st round pick, 2009 (EU)	To Saint John Sea Dogs 1st round pick, 2009 (EU); 4th round pick, 2010
January 5, 2009	To Shawinigan Cataractes Alex Grant; 5th round pick, 2010	to Saint John Sea Dogs Danick Gauthier; 2nd round pick, 2009; 1st round pick, 2010
January 5, 2009	To Rimouski Océanic Jason Demers	To Victoriaville Tigres 8th round pick, 2009
January 5, 2009	To Quebec Remparts Alexandre Néron	To Rimouski Océanic 1st round pick, 2009; 3rd round pick, 2009
January 2, 2009	To Gatineau Olympiques Alexei Dostoinov	To Saint John Sea Dogs 5th round pick, 2010
December 31, 2008	To Chicoutimi Saguenéens Drew Paris	To Acadie-Bathurst Titan 4th round pick, 2009; 4th round pick, 2010
December 31, 2008	To Val-d'Or Foreurs Matthew Lachaine; Jeremiah Coon-Come	To PEI Rocket Jason Legault; Maxime Lévesque
December 31, 2008	To Shawinigan Cataractes Nicolas Deslongchamps; 9th round pick, 2009	To Victoriaville Tigres Jean-Michel Fortier
December 30, 2008	To Moncton Wildcats Joe Dillon	To Val-d'Or Foreurs 12th round pick, 2009
December 30, 2008	To Rouyn-Noranda Huskies Mickael Audette	To Quebec Remparts 2nd round pick, 2009 (Drummondville Voltigeurs)
December 29, 2008	To Val-d'Or Foreurs---- Sasha Famin	To Moncton Wildcats Mitch Morgan; 3rd round pick, 2009; 1st round pick, 2010 (EU)
December 27, 2008	To Shawinigan Cataractes 4th round pick, 2009 (Shawinigan Cataractes)	To Lewiston Maineiacs 5th round pick, 2009
December 27, 2008	To Halifax Mooseheads Jan Stransky	To Gatineau Olympiques 5th round pick, 2010 (Chicoutimi Saguenéens)
December 26, 2008	To Cape Breton Screaming Eagles Michael Ward; Stephen Horyl	To Lewiston Maineiacs Samuel Finn; Murdock MacLellan; 5th round pick, 2010
December 26, 2008	To Cape Breton Screaming Eagles Taylor MacDougall	To Montreal Juniors Jérémy Gouchie
December 23, 2008	To Drummondville Voltigeurs Gabriel Coté	To Acadie-Bathurst Titan 7th round pick, 2009 (Val-d'Or Foreurs)
December 23, 2008	To Rimouski Océanic Logan MacMillan	to Halifax Mooseheads Guillaume Pelletier; 4th round pick, 2009; 2nd round pick, 2010; 2nd round pick, 2011; 3rd round pick, 2011
December 22, 2008	To Saint John Sea Dogs Benjamin Lecomte	To Rouyn-Noranda Huskies 6th round pick, 2009 (Rimouski Océanic)
December 22, 2008	To Lewiston Maineiacs Nick Huard	To Victoriaville Tigres Pierre-Luc Pelletier
December 22, 2008	To PEI Rocket Joel Champagne; Christopher Guay; 6th round pick, 2010	To Chicoutimi Saguenéens Mathieu Tousignant; 6th round pick, 2009 (Quebec Remparts)
December 22, 2008	To Drummondville Voltigeurs Marc-Antoine Dupuis	To Acadie-Bathurst 8th round pick, 2009 (Acadie-Bathurst Titan)
December 20, 2008	To Val-d'Or Foreurs Raphael Neiderer	To PEI Rocket William Beaudoin
December 20, 2008	To Acadie-Bathurst Titan Danick Malouin	To PEI Rocket 3rd round pick, 2009
November 25, 2008	To Gatineau Olympiques Kyle Paige	To Saint John Sea Dogs 9th round pick, 2010
October 15, 2008	To Drummondville Voltigeurs Patrik Prokop	To Gatineau Olympiques 6th round pick, 2008 (Gatineau Olympiques); 3rd round pick, 2010
October 9, 2008	To Halifax Mooseheads Radek Vlasanek	To Acadie-Bathurst Titan 5th round pick, 2010
October 6, 2008	To Val-d'Or Foreurs Francois Gauthier; 5th round pick, 2009	To Saint John Sea Dogs 1st round pick, 2009 (EU)
October 1, 2008	To Rouyn-Noranda Huskies Antoine Lafleur	To PEI Rocket 8th round pick (Drummondville Voltigeurs)
September 20, 2008	To Quebec Remparts Maxime Pomerleau	To Halifax Mooseheads 7th round pick, 2009

== QMJHL Playoffs ==
=== Overview ===
First Round
1C	Drummondville	4
4C	Lewiston	0
2O	Montreal	4
3O	Rouyn-Noranda	2
1A	Moncton	4
4A	P.E.I.	1
2E	Rimouski	4
3E	Chicoutimi	0
1E	Quebec	4
4E	Baie-Comeau	1
2A	Cape Breton	4
3A	Saint John	0
1O	Gatineau	4
5A	Acadie-Bathurst	1
2C	Shawinigan	4
3C	Victoriaville	0

Quarter-finals
1	Drummondville	4
8	Montreal	0
2	Moncton	1
7	Rimouski	4
3	Quebec	4
6	Cape Breton	3
4	Gatineau	1
5	Shawinigan	4

Semi-finals
1	Drummondville	4
7	Rimouski	0
3	Quebec	1
5	Shawinigan	4

QMJHL Championships
1	Drummondville	4
5	Shawinigan	3

== First round ==
=== (1C) Drummondville Voltigeurs vs. (4C) Lewiston Maineiacs ===
March 20	Drummondville Voltigeurs	12 – 3	Lewiston Maineiacs	Centre Marcel Dionne
5:50 - pp - Dany Massé (1); 13:54 - Yannick Riendeau (1)		First period	Maxime Gratchev (1) - pp - 1:49
2:59 - pp - Dany Massé (2); 9:08 - pp - Samson Mahbod (1); 13:28 - pp - Yannick Riendeau (2); 14:57 - Mike Hoffman (1)		Second period	Danick Paquette (1) - pp - 14:41
2:28 - Philippe Lefebvre (1); 3:22 - pp - Mike Hoffman (2); 5:57 - pp - Mike Hoffman (3); 8:06 - Mike Hoffman (4); 9:47 - Dany Massé (3); 17:52 - Charles Landry (1)		Third period	Alex Beaton (1) - pp - 9:19
Marco Cousineau (22 saves / 25 shots)		Goalie stats	Adrien Lemay (46 saves / 58 shots)

March 21	Drummondville Voltigeurs	10 – 1	Lewiston Maineiacs	Centre Marcel Dionne
5:27 - Dany Massé (4); 13:56 - pp - Dany Massé (5); 15:31 - pp - Yannick Riendeau (3); 16:10 - pp - Mike Hoffman (5)		First period	No scoring
0:32 - Mike Hoffman (6); 8:27 - Yannick Riendeau (4); 13:55 - pp - Dmitry Kulikov (1); 14:55 - pp - Marc-Olivier Vachon (1); 16:51 - Dany Massé (6); 18:49 - pp - Philippe Bergeron (1)		Second period	No scoring
No scoring		Third period	Dominic Savoie (1) - pp - 17:36
Marco Cousineau (16 saves / 17 shots)		Goalie stats	Peter Delmas (38 saves / 48 shots)

March 24	Lewiston Maineiacs	2 – 7	Drummondville Voltigeurs	Androscoggin Bank Colisée
8:29 - pp - Billy Lacasse (1); 10:16 - Maxime Gratchev (2)		First period	Yannick Riendeau (5) - pp - 3:59; Mike Hoffman (7) - 13:02; Yannick Riendeau (6) - pp - 19:06
No scoring		Second period	Olivier Hotte (1) - 7:58; Yannick Riendeau (7) - pp - 11:24
No scoring		Third period	Mike Hoffman (8) - pp - 1:06; Patrik Prokop (1) - pp - 16:24
Adrien Lemay (50 saves / 57 shots)		Goalie stats	Marco Cousineau (12 saves / 14 shots)

March 25	Lewiston Maineiacs	3 – 9	Drummondville Voltigeurs	Androscoggin Bank Colisée
No scoring		First period	Mike Hoffman (9) - pp - 3:49; Mike Hoffman (10) - pp - 6:50; Mike Hoffman (11) - 13:57; Dany Massé (7) - 14:16; Yannick Riendeau (8) - 15:15; Philippe Lefebvre (2) - 18:27
0:59 - pp - Dominic Savoie (2); 4:55 - Marc Bourgeois (1); 13:45 - sh - Tommy Déry (1)		Second period	Yannick Riendeau (9) - pp - 8:49; Christopher DiDomenico (1) - pp - 10:15; Christopher DiDomenico (2) - pp - 14:06
No scoring		Third period	No scoring
Peter Delmas (11 saves / 16 shots); Adrien Lemay (38 saves / 42 shots)		Goalie stats	Antoine Tardif (23 saves / 26 shots)

Drummondville won series 4 – 0

=== (2C) Shawinigan Cataractes vs. (3C) Victoriaville Tigres ===
March 20	Shawinigan Cataractes	5 – 2	Victoriaville Tigres	Centre Bionest
6:09 - sh - Maxime Legault (1); 6:58 - pp - Charles-Olivier Roussel (1)		First period	Philip-Michael Devos (1) - 7:39
6:28 - Nick Petersen (1)		Second period	No scoring
6:12 - Nick Petersen (2); 14:35 - pp - Simon Lacroix (1)		Third period	Andrej Nestrašil (1) - 15:36
Timo Pielmeier (22 saves / 24 shots)		Goalie stats	Kevin Poulin (46 saves / 51 shots)

March 21	Shawinigan Cataractes	7 – 1	Victoriaville Tigres	Centre Bionest
2:23 - pp - Alex Grant (1); 2:46 - pp - Philippe Paradis (1); 9:36 - pp - Charles-Olivier Roussel (2); 14:06 - Maxime Legault (2)		First period	No scoring
10:13 - pp - Maxime Macenauer (1)		Second period	No scoring
6:41 - pp - Maxime Macenauer (2); 11:55 - Pierre-Alexandre Vandall (1)		Third period	Andrej Nestrašil (2) - 4:51
Timo Pielmeier (27 saves / 28 shots)		Goalie stats	Kevin Poulin (26 saves / 33 shots); Antonio Mastropietro (5 saves / 5 shots)

March 24	Victoriaville Tigres	3 – 4	OT	Shawinigan Cataractes	Colisée Desjardins
8:34 - pp - David Cliche (1)		First period		Cedric McNicoll (1) - 10:40; Cedric McNicoll (2) - pp - 15:52
6:01 - David Cliche (2); 12:40 - Philip-Michael Devos (2)		Second period		Matthew Pistilli (1) - pp - 9:09
No scoring		Third period		No scoring
No scoring		First overtime period		Matthew Pistilli (2) - 2:35
Kevin Poulin (44 saves / 48 shots)		Goalie stats		Timo Pielmeier (24 saves / 27 shots)

March 25	Victoriaville Tigres	1 – 2	OT	Shawinigan Cataractes	Colisée Desjardins
16:05 - Brandon Hynes (1)		First period		Philippe Paradis (2) - 0:55
No scoring		Second period		No scoring
No scoring		Third period		No scoring
No scoring		First overtime period		Nick Petersen (3) - pp - 14:42
Kevin Poulin (51 saves / 53 shots)		Goalie stats		Timo Pielmeier (30 saves / 31 shots)

Shawinigan won series 4 – 0

=== (1A) Moncton Wildcats vs. (4A) P.E.I. Rocket ===
March 20	Moncton Wildcats	7 – 1	P.E.I. Rocket	Moncton Coliseum
2:27 - Adam Bezák (1); 5:05 - Scott Brannon (1); 9:42 - Randy Cameron (1)		First period	No scoring
19:18 - Devon MacAusland (1)		Second period	Benjamin Casavant (1) - pp - 1:39
3:34 - Randy Cameron (2); 15:24 - Matt Eagles (1); 16:24 - Zach Sill (1)		Third period	No scoring
Nicola Riopel (40 saves / 41 shots)		Goalie stats	Bobby Nadeau (22 saves / 27 shots); Evan Mosher (4 saves / 6 shots)

March 21	Moncton Wildcats	5 – 0	P.E.I. Rocket	Moncton Coliseum
19:53 - Ted Stephens (1)		First period	No scoring
0:56 - Tomy Joly (1); 2:07 - Adam Bezák (2); 15:53 - pp - Ted Stephens (2); 18:58 - Matt Eagles (2)		Second period	No scoring
No scoring		Third period	No scoring
Nicola Riopel (35 saves / 35 shots)		Goalie stats	Bobby Nadeau (25 saves / 30 shots); Evan Mosher (7 saves / 7 shots)

March 23	P.E.I. Rocket	2 – 3	OT	Moncton Wildcats	Charlottetown Civic Centre
No scoring		First period		No scoring
No scoring		Second period		David Savard (1) - pp - 6:50
18:21 - Benjamin Casavant (2); 18:32 - Jarrad Struthers (1)		Third period		David Savard (2) - 13:13
No scoring		First overtime period		David Savard (3) - 5:27
Bobby Nadeau (31 saves / 34 shots)		Goalie stats		Nicola Riopel (30 saves / 32 shots)

March 25	P.E.I. Rocket	5 – 4	Moncton Wildcats	Charlottetown Civic Centre
1:41 - Lucas McKinley (1); 5:55 - pp - Ben Duffy (1)		First period	Matt Eagles (3) - 7:08
19:56 - Jarrad Struthers (2)		Second period	Brandon Gormley (1) - 5:10
6:14 - Chris Doyle (1); 10:22 - pp - Jean-Philippe Mathieu (1)		Third period	Zach Sill (2) - 2:30; David Savard (4) - 18:59
Bobby Nadeau (41 saves / 45 shots)		Goalie stats	Nicola Riopel (19 saves / 24 shots)

March 28	Moncton Wildcats	4 – 3	P.E.I. Rocket	Moncton Coliseum
No scoring		First period	Chris Doyle (2) - 19:52
12:38 - Ted Stephens (3); 13:28 - Scott Brannon (2)		Second period	Brandon Street (1) - 14:28
6:32 - Matt Brown (1); 8:39 - pp - Ted Stephens (4)		Third period	Jean-Philippe Mathieu (2) - pp - 13:12
Nicola Riopel (21 saves / 24 shots)		Goalie stats	Bobby Nadeau (45 saves / 49 shots)

Moncton won series 4 – 1

=== (2A) Cape Breton Screaming Eagles vs. (3A) Saint John Sea Dogs ===
March 20	Cape Breton Screaming Eagles	5 – 4	OT	Saint John Sea Dogs	Centre 200
4:26 - Nick MacNeil (1)		First period		Michael Kirkpatrick (1) - 5:14; Steven Anthony (1) - 10:18; Danick Gauthier (1) - 18:40
0:34 - Michael Ward (1)		Second period		No scoring
11:33 - Jean-Christophe Gauthier (1); 19:26 - Joey Haddad (1)		Third period		Michael Kirkpatrick (2) - pp - 0:19
10:04 - pp - Joey Haddad (2)		First overtime period		No scoring
Olivier Roy (25 saves / 29 shots)		Goalie stats		Robert Mayer (36 saves / 41 shots)

March 21	Cape Breton Screaming Eagles	5 – 2	Saint John Sea Dogs	Centre 200
7:59 - Chris Culligan (1); 12:41 - sh - Joey Haddad (3)		First period	No scoring
12:21 - Nick MacNeil (2); 14:24 - Nick MacNeil (3)		Second period	Payton Liske (1) - pp - 16:08
12:02 - pp - Jean-Christophe Gauthier (2)		Third period	David Štich (1) - 9:50
Olivier Roy (28 saves / 30 shots)		Goalie stats	Robert Mayer (22 saves / 26 shots); Karel St-Laurent (17 saves / 18 shots)

March 24	Saint John Sea Dogs	3 – 8	Cape Breton Screaming Eagles	Harbour Station
9:16 - Ryan Sparling (1)		First period	Joey Haddad (4) - 2:17; Nicolas Chouinard (1) - 8:47; Taylor MacDougall (1) - 14:47
1:10 - Payton Liske (2); 15:58 - pp - Olivier Ouellet (1)		Second period	Robert Slaney (1) - pp - 3:21; Stephen Horyl (1) - 8:52; Nicolas Chouinard (2) - 12:44; Taylor MacDougall (2) - pp - 18:09
No scoring		Third period	Nick MacNeil (4) - pp - 3:41
Robert Mayer (9 saves / 13 shots); Karel St-Laurent (13 saves / 17 shots)		Goalie stats	Olivier Roy (24 saves / 27 shots)

March 25	Saint John Sea Dogs	2 – 3	Cape Breton Screaming Eagles	Harbour Station
No scoring		First period	Marco Desveaux (1) - 6:06
0:46 - pp - Olivier Ouellet (2)		Second period	Robert Slandy (2) - 9:42
19:44 - Payton Liske (3)		Third period	Robert Slaney (3) - pp - 6:03
Robert Mayer (29 saves / 32 shots)		Goalie stats	Olivier Roy (25 saves / 27 shots)

Cape Breton won series 4 – 0

=== (1O) Gatineau Olympiques vs. (5A) Acadie–Bathurst Titan ===
March 20	Gatineau Olympiques	5 – 4	OT	Acadie–Bathurst Titan	Centre Robert Guertin
1:26 - Joshua Domingues (1); 12:22 - Maxime Mallette (1); 17:09 - pp - Tye McGinn (1)		First period		Artem Demkov (1) - 13:39; Taylor Lambke (1) - pp - 18:54
9:45 - Jean-Philip Chabot (1)		Second period		Spencer Jezegou (1) - pp - 4:07
		Third period		Danick Malouin (1) - pp - 4:38
15:29 - Tye McGinn (2)		First overtime period		No scoring
Marc-Antoine Gélinas (26 saves / 30 shots)		Goalie stats		Nicolas Champion (50 saves / 55 shots)

March 21	Gatineau Olympiques	8 – 2	Acadie–Bathurst Titan	Centre Robert Guertin
15:15 - sh - Hugo Laporte (1); 18:44 - Nicolas Boyer (1)		First period	Taylor Lambke (2) - pp - 16:11
8:04 - Yoan Pinette (1)		Second period	Éric Faille (1) - 1:36
9:47 - Steven Delisle (1); 14:29 - pp - Jean-Philip Chabot (2); 18:13 - pp - Nicolas Boyer (2); 18:21 - pp - Vincent Barnard (1); 19:21 - pp - Christian Ouellet (1)		Third period	No scoring
Marc-Antoine Gélinas (28 saves / 30 shots); Maxime Clermont (0 saves / 0 shots)		Goalie stats	Nicolas Champion (20 saves / 25 shots); Frédéric Piché (4 saves / 7 shots)

March 24	Acadie–Bathurst Titan	5 – 3	Gatineau Olympiques	K. C. Irving Regional Centre
No scoring		First period	Josh McQuade (1) - 1:03
0:30 - pp - Spencer Jezegou (2); 3:49 - Rémi Blanchard (1); 12:40 - Vincent Couture (1)		Second period	Maxime Mallette (2) - 11:03
13:08 - Artem Demkov (2); 18:00 - Éric Faille (2)		Third period	Maxime Mallette (3) - pp - 6:06
Nicolas Champion (47 saves / 50 shots)		Goalie stats	Marc-Antoine Gélinas (29 saves / 34 shots)

March 25	Acadie–Bathurst Titan	0 – 4	Gatineau Olympiques	K. C. Irving Regional Centre
No scoring		First period	Jean-Philip Chabot (3) - pp - 10:36
No scoring		Second period	Maxime Mallette (4) - pp - 9:01; Alexandre Touchette (1) - 9:08
No scoring		Third period	Paul Byron (1) - sh - en - 16:21
Nicolas Champion (36 saves / 39 shots)		Goalie stats	Marc-Antoine Gélinas (18 saves / 18 shots)

March 27	Acadie–Bathurst Titan	3 – 4	OT	Gatineau Olympiques	K. C. Irving Regional Centre
No scoring		First period		No scoring
Artem Demkov (3) - 3:15; Artem Demkov (4) - pp - 6:15		Second period		6:42 - Alexandre Touchette (2); 19:44 - pp - Tye McGinn (3)
Éric Faille (3) - 14:08		Third period		18:04 - Steven Delisle (2)
No scoring		First overtime period		1:30 - Alexandre Touchette (3)
Nicolas Champion (48 saves / 52 shots)		Goalie stats		Marc-Antoine Gélinas (19 saves / 22 shots)

Gatineau won series 4 – 1

=== (2O) Montreal Junior Hockey Club vs. (3O) Rouyn-Noranda Huskies ===
March 20	Montreal Junior Hockey Club	5 – 3	Rouyn-Noranda Huskies	Auditorium de Verdun
4:16 - Nick Layton (1); 11:23 - pp - Dmitri Kostromitin (1)		First period	No scoring
No scoring		Second period	Benoît Gervais (1) - 10:45
3:09 - pp - Louis-Marc Aubry (1); 9:30 - pp - Matt Fillier (1); 19:44 - en - David Foucher (1)		Third period	Nicolas Deslauriers (1) - pp - 14:36; Dominik Boháč (1) - 18:40
Jake Allen (25 saves / 28 shots)		Goalie stats	Mickaël Audette (28 saves / 32 shots)

March 21	Montreal Junior Hockey Club	3 – 4	Rouyn-Noranda Huskies	Auditorium de Verdun
16:18 - pp - T.J. Brennan (1)		First period	Sergey Ostapchuk (1) - pp - 15:37
14:59 - pp - Guillaume Asselin (1); 15:27 - Samuel Grenache (1)		Second period	Christophe Losier (1) - pp - 1:02; Jérôme Côté (1) - 1:24
No scoring		Third period	Michaël Beaudry (1) - 6:02
Jake Allen (24 saves / 28 shots)		Goalie stats	Mickaël Audette (35 saves / 38 shots)

March 24	Rouyn-Noranda Huskies	1 – 4	Montreal Junior Hockey Club	Aréna Dave-Keon
9:53 - Gabriel Lévesque (1)		First period	Louis-Marc Aubry (2) - pp - 16:53
No scoring		Second period	T.J. Brennan (2) - pp - 12:15
No scoring		Third period	Toni Ritter (1) - pp - 8:14; Nick Layton (2) - pp - 18:00
Mickaël Audette (18 saves / 22 shots)		Goalie stats	Jake Allen (23 saves / 24 shots)

March 25	Rouyn-Noranda Huskies	3 – 2	Montreal Junior Hockey Club	Aréna Dave-Keon
No scoring		First period	Jérémy Gouchie (1) - sh - 19:21
2:12 - Jeff Desjardins (1)		Second period	No scoring
7:35 - Brad Yetman (1); 8:39 - pp - Jeff Desjardins (2)		Third period	Toni Ritter (2) - pp - 14:56
Mickaël Audette (24 saves / 26 shots)		Goalie stats	Jake Allen (28 saves / 31 shots)

March 27	Montreal Junior Hockey Club	7 – 0	Rouyn-Noranda Huskies	Auditorium de Verdun
Toni Ritter (3) - pp - 13:45		First period	No scoring
No scoring		Second period	No scoring
T.J. Brennan (3) - 1:42; Jérémy Gouchie (2) - 9:03; Guillaume Asselin (2) - pp - 11:26; T.J. Brennan (4) - 12:52; Toni Ritter (4) - pp - 14:53; Guillaume Asselin (3) - pp - 15:33		Third period	No scoring
Jake Allen (15 saves / 15 shots)		Goalie stats	Mickaël Audette (26 saves / 30 shots); Luke Gallant (3 saves / 6 shots)

March 27	Rouyn-Noranda Huskies	3 – 4	Montreal Junior Hockey Club	Aréna Dave-Keon
13:45 - pp - Nicolas Deslauriers (2); 14:18 - Alexandre Beauregard (1)		First period	No scoring
No scoring		Second period	Nick Layton (3) - pp - 7:13; Pat O'Keefe (1) - 7:28; Matthew Brenton (1) - sh - 9:20
6:18 - Alexandre Beauregard (2)		Third period	Nick Layton (4) - 8:50
Mickaël Audette (17 saves / 21 shots)		Goalie stats	Jake Allen (39 saves / 42 shots)

Montreal won series 4 – 2

=== (1E) Quebec Remparts vs. (4E) Baie-Comeau Drakkar ===
March 20	Quebec Remparts	8 – 1	Baie-Comeau Drakkar	Colisée Pepsi
6:47 - pp - Jean-Simon Allard (1); 11:10 - Samuel Carrier (1); 19:43 - Mikaël Tam (1)		First period	No scoring
17:18 - Mikhail Stefanovich (1); 18:06 - Mikaël Tam (2)		Second period	Félix Petit (1) - 1618
0:35 - pp - Dmitri Kugryshev (1); 12:46 - sh - Benjamin Breault (1); 16:19 - pp - David Gilbert (1)		Third period	No scoring
Charles Lavigne (16 saves / 17 shots)		Goalie stats	François Lacerte (18 saves / 24 shots); Charles-André Pelletier (6 saves / 8 shots)

March 21	Quebec Remparts	5 – 2	Baie-Comeau Drakkar	Colisée Pepsi
0:45 - Dmitri Kugryshev (2); 15:00 - pp - Mikhail Stefanovich (2); 18:29 - Marc-Olivier Vallerand (1)		First period	No scoring
8:07 - pp - Kelsey Tessier (1)		Second period	No scoring
11:25 - Marc-Olivier Vallerand (2)		Third period	Mike Villeneuve (1) - pp - 16:12; Simon Darveau (1) - pp - 18:53
Charles Lavigne (31 saves / 33 shots)		Goalie stats	François Lacerte (21 saves / 26 shots)

March 24	Baie-Comeau Drakkar	4 – 3	Quebec Remparts	Centre Henry-Leonard
3:57 - Marc-Olivier Mimar (1)		First period	No scoring
14:10 - Félix Petit (2); 15:34 - Guillaume Goulet (1)		Second period	Guillaume Monast (1) - pp - 7:45; Dmitri Kugryshev (3) - pp - 17:25; Mikhail Stefanovich (3) - 18:52
3:13 - Guillaume Goulet (2)		Third period	No scoring
Nathan Dunnett (31 saves / 34 shots)		Goalie stats	Charles Lavigne (19 saves / 23 shots)

March 25	Baie-Comeau Drakkar	2 – 5	Quebec Remparts	Centre Henry-Leonard
No scoring		First period	Kelsey Tessier (2) - pp - 3:06
8:18 - Roman Maliník (1); 19:36 - pp - Pierre-Luc Lessard (1)		Second period	Marc-Olivier Vallerand (3) - 4:01; Mikhail Stefanovich (4) - 14:48
No scoring		Third period	Kelsey Tessier (3) - 3:04; Mikaël Tam (3) - 15:07
Nathan Dunnett (19 saves / 24 shots)		Goalie stats	Charles Lavigne (22 saves / 24 shots)

March 27	Quebec Remparts	7 – 1	Baie-Comeau Drakkar	Colisée Pepsi
16:53 - sh - Samuel Groulx (1)		First period	No scoring
3:17 - Kelsey Tessier (4); 7:26 - Dmitri Kugryshev (4)		Second period	Guillaume Goulet (3) - pp - 10:52
5:21 - David Gilbert (2); 11:03 - sh - Benjamin Breault (2); 17:07 - Jean-Simon Allard (2); 19:19 - Marc-Olivier Vallerand (4)		Third period	No scoring
Charles Lavigne (15 saves / 16 shots)		Goalie stats	Nathan Dunnett (20 saves / 23 shots); François Lacerte (17 saves / 21 shots)

Quebec won series 4 – 1

=== (2E) Rimouski Océanic vs. (3E) Chicoutimi Saguenéens ===
March 20	Rimouski Océanic	8 – 2	Chicoutimi Saguenéens	Colisée de Rimouski
7:01 - Patrick Delisle-Houde (1); 12:04 - Logan MacMillan (1); 17:42 - pp - Patrice Cormier (1)		First period	No scoring
8:47 - Keven Veilleux (1); 15:14 - pp - Philippe Cornet (1)		Second period	No scoring
9:56 - pp - Olivier Fortier (1); 15:01 - pp - Emmanuel Boudreau (1); 19:43 - Luca Cunti (1)		Third period	Mathieu Tousignant (1) - pp - 4:14; Drew Paris (1) - pp - 6:57
Maxime Gougeon (19 saves / 21 shots)		Goalie stats	François Lévesque (21 saves / 26 shots); John Nauta (8 saves / 11 shots)

March 21	Rimouski Océanic	5 – 1	Chicoutimi Saguenéens	Colisée de Rimouski
11:07 - pp - Sébastien Piché (1); 14:55 - pp - Marc-André Bourdon (1); 18:05 - Olivier Fortier (2)		First period	No scoring
10:37 - Philippe Cornet (2); 18:22 - pp - Olivier Fortier (3)		Second period	No scoring
No scoring		Third period	Michaël Bélanger (1) - pp - 0:17
Maxime Gougeon (28 saves / 29 shots)		Goalie stats	François Lévesque (31 saves / 36 shots)

March 24	Chicoutimi Saguenéens	3 – 6	Rimouski Océanic	Centre Georges-Vézina
9:59 - pp - Luc-Olivier Blain (1)		First period	No scoring
4:08 - Nicolas Deschamps (1)		Second period	Philippe Cornet (3) - 1:09; Keven Veilleux (2) - pp - 6:40; Patrice Cormier (2) - pp - 15:29
12:55 - pp - Nicolas Deschamps (2)		Third period	Jordan Caron (1) - 0:19; Emmanuel Boudreau (2) - pp - 8:54; Félix Lefrançois (1) - 19:01
François Lévesque (24 saves / 30 shots)		Goalie stats	Maxime Gougeon (20 saves / 23 shots)

March 25	Chicoutimi Saguenéens	3 – 4	Rimouski Océanic	Centre Georges-Vézina
9:50 - Maxim Guérin (1)		First period	Keven Veilleux (3) - 1:15; Luca Cunti (2) - 8:01
No scoring		Second period	No scoring
11:40 - Nicolas Deschamps (3); 19:45 - Jacob Lagacé (1)		Third period	Mathieu Asselin (1) - 3:49; Sébastien Piché (2) - 19:02
François Lévesque (15 saves / 19 shots)		Goalie stats	Maxime Gougeon (27 saves / 30 shots)

Rimouski won series 4 – 0

== Quarter-finals ==
=== (1) Drummondville Voltigeurs vs. (8) Montreal Junior Hockey Club ===
April 3	Drummondville Voltigeurs	7 – 1	Montreal Junior Hockey Club	Centre Marcel Dionne
7:16 - ps - Mike Hoffman (12); 15:17 - pp - Dany Massé (8)		First period	No scoring
0:34 - pp - Mike Hoffman (13); 3:01 - Christopher DiDomenico (3); 4:44 - pp - Yannick Riendeau (10); 16:17 - pp - Samson Mahbod (2)		Second period	No scoring
1:10 - pp - Samson Mahbod (3)		Third period	Nick Layton (5) - 7:26
Marco Cousineau (26 saves / 27 shots)		Goalie stats	Jake Allen (30 saves / 36 shots); Jean-François Bérubé (29 saves / 30 shots)

April 4	Drummondville Voltigeurs	4 – 3	OT	Montreal Junior Hockey Club	Centre Marcel Dionne
18:22 - Gabriel Dumont (1)		First period		Pat O'Keefe (2) - 0:34
13:52 - pp - Dany Massé (9)		Second period		Samuel Grenache (2) - 11:50; Dmitri Kostromitin (2) - 12:07
5:35 - Dany Massé (10); 7:39 - Marc-Olivier Vachon (2)		Third period		No scoring
Marco Cousineau (6 saves / 9 shots); Antoine Tardif (6 saves / 6 shots)		Goalie stats		Jake Allen (45 saves / 49 shots)

April 7	Montreal Junior Hockey Club	1 – 6	Drummondville Voltigeurs	Auditorium de Verdun
No scoring		First period	No scoring
1:42 - pp - Jérémy Gouchie (3)		Second period	Benoît Lévesque (1) - 5:48; Marc-Antoine Desnoyers (1) - sh - 17:53; Yannick Riendeau (11) - 19:35
No scoring		Third period	Dmitry Kulikov (2) - pp - 3:39; Patrik Prokop (2) - 6:57; Yannick Riendeau (12) - pp - 14:20
Jake Allen (42 saves / 48 shots)		Goalie stats	Marco Cousineau (21 saves / 22 shots)

April 8	Montreal Junior Hockey Club	3 – 5	Drummondville Voltigeurs	Auditorium de Verdun
No scoring		First period	Yannick Riendeau (13) - pp - 3:39; Gabriel Dumont (2) - sh - 5:33; Yannick Riendeau (14) - pp - 10:28
7:42 - Guillaume Asselin (4)		Second period	Benoît Lévesque (2) - 7:10
7:26 - Darick Ste-Marie (1); 12:20 - Nick Layton (6)		Third period	Marc-Olivier Vachon (3) - 9:09
Jake Allen (35 saves / 39 shots)		Goalie stats	Antoine Tardif (27 saves / 30 shots)

Drummondville won series 4 – 0

=== (2) Moncton Wildcats vs. (7) Rimouski Océanic ===
April 3	Moncton Wildcats	1 – 2	Rimouski Océanic	Aréna Jean-Louis Lévesque
No scoring		First period	No scoring
No scoring		Second period	Keven Veilleux (4) - 9:36
3:26 - David Savard (5)		Third period	Logan MacMillan (2) - 14:56
Nicola Riopel (24 saves / 26 shots)		Goalie stats	Maxime Gougeon (22 saves / 23 shots)

April 4	Moncton Wildcats	3 – 0	Rimouski Océanic	Aréna Jean-Louis Lévesque
13:54 - pp - Ted Stephens (5)		First period	No scoring
11:08 - Randy Cameron (3)		Second period	No scoring
10:30 - sh - Zach Sill (3)		Third period	No scoring
Nicola Riopel (32 saves / 32 shots)		Goalie stats	Maxime Gougeon (29 saves / 32 shots)

April 7	Rimouski Océanic	3 – 2	2OT	Moncton Wildcats	Colisée de Rimouski
12:40 - pp - Jordan Caron (2)		First period		Pierre-Marc Lessard (1) - 9:29
No scoring		Second period		No scoring
19:11 - Patrice Cormier (3)		Third period		Scott Brannon (3) - 15:02
0:24 - Jordan Caron (3)		Second overtime period		No scoring
Maxime Gougeon (29 saves / 31 shots)		Goalie stats		Nicola Riopel (31 saves / 34 shots)

April 8	Rimouski Océanic	4 – 2	Moncton Wildcats	Colisée de Rimouski
0:53 - Keven Veilleux (5)		First period	No scoring
4:42 - pp - Patrice Cormier (4); 13:22 - sh - Logan MacMillan (3)		Second period	Zach Sill (4) - sh - 10:45
1:10 - pp - Luca Cunti (3)		Third period	Tomy Joly (2) - 11:13
Maxime Gougeon (14 saves / 15 shots); Matthew Dopud (10 saves / 11 shots)		Goalie stats	Nicola Riopel (37 saves / 41 shots)

April 10	Moncton Wildcats	0 – 1	Rimouski Océanic	Aréna Jean-Louis Lévesque
No scoring		First period	Emmanuel Boudreau (3) - 18:20
No scoring		Second period	No scoring
No scoring		Third period	No scoring
Nicola Riopel (38 saves / 39 shots)		Goalie stats	Maxime Gougeon (24 saves / 24 shots)

Rimouski won series 4 – 1

=== (3) Quebec Remparts vs. (6) Cape Breton Screaming Eagles ===
April 3	Quebec Remparts	2 – 3	4OT	Cape Breton Screaming Eagles	Colisée Pepsi
9:52 - pp - Jonathan Audy-Marchessault (1)		First period		Taylor MacDougall (3) - 5:29
1:34 - pp - Mikhail Stefanovich (5)		Second period		Joey Haddad (5) - 0:39
No scoring		Third period		No scoring
No scoring		Fourth overtime period		Robert Slaney (4) - 12:57
Charles Lavigne (68 saves / 71 shots)		Goalie stats		Olivier Roy (65 saves / 67 shots)

April 5	Quebec Remparts	3 – 5	Cape Breton Screaming Eagles	Colisée Pepsi
14:54 - pp - Guillaume Monast (2)		First period	Robert Slaney (5) - pp - 16:31
11:15 - Marc-Olivier Vallerand (5)		Second period	Chris Culligan (2) - 0:55; Joey Haddad (6) - 14:52
10:44 - pp - Kevin Marshall (1)		Third period	Vincent Lavigueur (1) - 1:28; Mathieu Brodeur (1) - sh - 6:19
Charles Lavigne (12 saves / 17 shots); Jonathan Roy (4 saves / 4 shots)		Goalie stats	Olivier Roy (22 saves / 25 shots)

April 7	Cape Breton Screaming Eagles	2 – 3	Quebec Remparts	Centre 200
7:53 - Chris Culligan (3)		First period	Mikhail Stefanovich (6) - pp - 14:03
19:50 - pp - Nick MacNeil (5)		Second period	Dmitri Kugryshev (5) - 18:16
No scoring		Third period	Kelsey Tessier (5) - pp - 1:19
Olivier Roy (24 saves / 27 shots)		Goalie stats	Charles Lavigne (36 saves / 38 shots)

April 8	Cape Breton Screaming Eagles	2 – 5	Quebec Remparts	Centre 200
No scoring		First period	David Gilbert (3) - 14:57
2:57 - Taylor MacDougall (4)		Second period	Mathieu Loisel (1) - 5:54; Kelsey Tessier (6) - 9:12
11:40 - Joey Haddad (7)		Third period	Mikhail Stefanovich (7) - pp - 8:29; Marc-Olivier Vallerand (6) - pp - 18:34
Olivier Roy (25 saves / 30 shots)		Goalie stats	Charles Lavigne (36 saves / 38 shots)

April 10	Cape Breton Screaming Eagles	3 – 2	Quebec Remparts	Centre 200
No scoring		First period	No scoring
Francis Meilleur (1) - 7:18		Second period	10:30 - pp - Mikhail Stefanovich (8)
Joey Haddad (8) - 0:23; Nicolas Chouinard (3) - pp - 3:00		Third period	8:50 - pp - Frederick Roy (1)
Olivier Roy (21 saves / 23 shots)		Goalie stats	Charles Lavigne (31 saves / 34 shots)

April 13	Quebec Remparts	3 – 0	Cape Breton Screaming Eagles	Colisée Pepsi
No scoring		First period	No scoring
Kelsey Tessier (7) - pp - 5:19		Second period	No scoring
Dmitri Kugryshev (6) - pp - 18:21; Kelsey Tessier (8) - en - 18:48		Third period	No scoring
Charles Lavigne (34 saves / 34 shots)		Goalie stats	Olivier Roy (19 saves / 21 shots)

April 14	Quebec Remparts	3 – 0	Cape Breton Screaming Eagles	Colisée Pepsi
1:51 - Mikhail Stefanovich (9)		First period	No scoring
14:46 - Marc-Olivier Vallerand (7)		Second period	No scoring
19:00 - en - Benjamin Breault (3)		Third period	No scoring
Charles Lavigne (25 saves / 25 shots)		Goalie stats	Olivier Roy (25 saves / 27 shots)

Quebec won series 4 – 3

=== (4) Gatineau Olympiques vs. (5) Shawinigan Cataractes ===
April 3	Gatineau Olympiques	3 – 4	Shawinigan Cataractes	Centre Robert Guertin
9:29 - Yoan Pinette (2)		First period	No scoring
14:45 - Olivier Croteau (1); 17:24 - pp - Jean-Philip Chabot (4)		Second period	Matthew Pistilli (3) - pp - 2:16; Dave Labrecque (1) - 6:00; Cedric McNicoll (3) - pp - 9:24
No scoring		Third period	Matthew Pistilli (4) - 11:11
Marc-Antoine Gelinas (29 saves / 33 shots)		Goalie stats	Timo Pielmeier (22 saves / 25 shots)

April 4	Gatineau Olympiques	5 – 3	Shawinigan Cataractes	Centre Robert Guertin
16:32 - pp - Tye McGinn (4)		First period	No scoring
14:56 - pp - Jean-Philip Chabot (5); 19:54 - Jean-Philip Chabot (6)		Second period	Cedric McNicoll (4) - 13:55
17:41 - pp - Tye McGinn (5); 19:08 - en - Tye McGinn (6)		Third period	Charles-Olivier Roussel (3) - pp - 4:20; Pierre-Alexandre Vandall (2) - pp - 12:10
Marc-Antoine Gelinas (37 saves / 40 shots)		Goalie stats	Timo Pielmeier (31 saves / 35 shots)

April 7	Shawinigan Cataractes	6 – 3	Gatineau Olympiques	Centre Bionest
6:05 - pp - Nick Petersen (4); 18:23 - pp - Cedric McNicoll (5)		First period	No scoring
11:33 - Pierrick Martel (1); 15:44 - Cedric McNicoll (6)		Second period	Josh McQuade (2) - 14:51
6:25 - pp - Nick Petersen (5); 12:46 - Maxime Legault (3)		Third period	Paul Byron (2) - 6:57; Maxime Mallette (5) - pp - 14:30
Timo Pielmeier (16 saves / 19 shots)		Goalie stats	Marc-Antoine Gelinas (29 saves / 34 shots); Maxime Clermont (5 saves / 6 shots)

April 8	Shawinigan Cataractes	4 – 2	Gatineau Olympiques	Centre Bionest
2:10 - Nick Petersen (6)		First period	Jean-Philip Chabot (7) - pp - 4:28; Christian Ouellet (2) - 4:56
3:37 - pp - Matthew Pistilli (5); 5:06 - Dave Labrecque (2)		Second period	No scoring
8:48 - Maxime Macenauer (3)		Third period	No scoring
Timo Pielmeier (22 saves / 24 shots)		Goalie stats	Marc-Antoine Gelinas (39 saves / 43 shots)

April 10	Gatineau Olympiques	2 – 5	Shawinigan Cataractes	Centre Robert Guertin
8:49 - Christian Ouellet (3); 11:24 - Tye McGinn (7)		First period	Pierre-Alexandre Vandall (3) - pp - 1:48; Maxime Macenauer (4) - 5:38
No scoring		Second period	Charles-Olivier Roussel (4) - pp - 1:40
No scoring		Third period	Cedric McNicoll (7) - pp - 1:38; Philippe Paradis (3) - 15:19
Marc-Antoine Gelinas (37 saves / 42 shots)		Goalie stats	Timo Pielmeier (18 saves / 20 shots)

Shawinigan won series 4 – 1

== Semi-finals ==
=== (1) Drummondville Voltigeurs vs. (7) Rimouski Océanic ===
April 17	Drummondville Voltigeurs	8 – 1	Rimouski Océanic	Centre Marcel Dionne
0:11 - Marc-Olivier Vachon (4); 12:07 - pp - Mike Hoffman (14); 19:06 - pp - Christopher DiDomenico (4)		First period	No scoring
19:46 - pp - Yannick Riendeau (15)		Second period	Félix Lefrançois (2) - 10:44
7:44 - pp - Samson Mahbod (4); 9:59 - pp - Mike Hoffman (15); 14:06 - pp - Gabriel Dumont (3); 19:43 - pp - Charles Landry (2)		Third period	No scoring
Marco Cousineau (26 saves / 27 shots)		Goalie stats	Maxime Gougeon (43 saves / 51 shots)

April 19	Drummondville Voltigeurs	4 – 3	Rimouski Océanic	Centre Marcel Dionne
15:42 - pp - Mike Hoffman (16)		First period	Keven Veilleux (6) - pp - 8:26; Jordan Caron (4) - 9:17
No scoring		Second period	Jordan Caron (5) - pp - 4:27
13:31 - pp - Yannick Riendeau (16); 14:14 - Gabriel Dumont (4); 19:43 - pp - Patrik Prokop (3)		Third period	No scoring
Marco Cousineau (18 saves / 21 shots)		Goalie stats	Maxime Gougeon (41 saves / 45 shots)

April 21	Rimouski Océanic	4 – 6	Drummondville Voltigeurs	Colisée de Rimouski
No scoring		First period	Yannick Riendeau (17) - 9:23; Patrik Prokop (4) - 13:54
12:40 - Luca Cunti (4); 15:44 - Olivier Fortier (4)		Second period	Gabriel Dumont (5) - 15:06; Marc-Olivier Vachon (5) - 19:18
11:05 - pp - Keven Veilleux (7)		Third period	Ryan McKiernan (1) - 8:19; Benoît Lévesque (3) - en - 19:04
Maxime Gougeon (22 saves / 27 shots)		Goalie stats	Marco Cousineau (19 saves / 23 shots)

April 22	Rimouski Océanic	2 – 7	Drummondville Voltigeurs	Colisée de Rimouski
No scoring		First period	1:25 - Yannick Riendeau (18); 2:24 - Marc-Olivier Vachon (6); 5:49 - Mike Hoffman (17); 12:31 - Yannick Riendeau (19); 17:59 - Philippe Lefebvre (3)
Philippe Cornet (4) - pp - 8:48		Second period	9:20 - Gabriel Dumont (6); 16:08 - pp - Dany Massé (11)
Alexandre Durette (1) - sh - 15:45		Third period	No scoring
Maxime Gougeon (9 saves / 14 shots); Matthew Dopud (23 saves / 25 shots)		Goalie stats	Marco Cousineau (20 saves / 22 shots)

Drummondville won series 4 – 0

=== (3) Quebec Remparts vs. (5) Shawinigan Cataractes ===
April 17	Quebec Remparts	4 – 2	Shawinigan Cataractes	Colisée Pepsi
No scoring		First period	Maxime Legault (4) - 0:34
5:01 - Kelsey Tessier (9) `10:42 - Samuel Groulx (2)		Second period	Philippe Paradis (4) - pp - 18:34
0:41 - Mikhail Stefanovich (10); 16:52 - Frederick Roy (2)		Third period	No scoring
Charles Lavigne (38 saves / 40 shots)		Goalie stats	Timo Pielmeier (29 saves / 33 shots)

April 18	Quebec Remparts	3 – 4	Shawinigan Cataractes	Colisée Pepsi
6:36 - Mikhail Stefanovich (11); 14:38 - Marc-Olivier Vallerand (8)		First period	Maxime Legault (5) - 4:58; Gabriel Lemieux (1) - 8:49; Matthew Pistilli (6) - 18:19
0:33 - Jonathan Audy-Marchessault (2)		Second period	Matthew Pistilli (7) - 18:34
No scoring		Third period	No scoring
Charles Lavigne (30 saves / 34 shots)		Goalie stats	Timo Pielmeier (19 saves / 22 shots)

April 21	Shawinigan Cataractes	4 – 1	Quebec Remparts	Centre Bionest
No scoring		First period	No scoring
5:46 - Cedric McNicoll (8); 14:06 - pp - Philippe Paradis (5)		Second period	No scoring
4:38 - Cedric McNicoll (9); 8:02 - sh - en - Cedric McNicoll (10)		Third period	Benjamin Breault (4) - pp - 14:41
Timo Pielmeier (20 saves / 21 shots)		Goalie stats	Charles Lavigne (39 saves / 42 shots); Jonathan Roy (5 saves / 5 shots)

April 22	Shawinigan Cataractes	5 – 4	Quebec Remparts	Centre Bionest
No scoring		First period	Mikaël Tam (4) - 5:20; David Gilbert (4) - 10:07; Guillaume Monast (3) - pp - 15:38
3:53 - Cedric McNicoll (11); 12:27 - pp - Nick Petersen (7); 14:16 - Maxime Legault (6)		Second period	David Gilbert (5) - 18:08
2:43 - Maxime Legault (7); 11:20 - pp - Matthew Pistilli (8)		Third period	No scoring
Timo Pielmeier (11 saves / 14 shots); Gabriel Girard (11 saves / 12 shots)		Goalie stats	Charles Lavigne (36 saves / 41 shots)

April 24	Quebec Remparts	1 – 6	Shawinigan Cataractes	Colisée Pepsi
No scoring		First period	Nick Petersen (8) - 15:35; Maxime Legault (8) - 19:15
8:36 - David Gilbert (6)		Second period	Matthew Pistilli (9) - pp - 5:23; Nick Petersen (9) - pp - 10:34; Maxime Legault (9) - sh - 18:22
No scoring		Third period	Pierre-Alexandre Vandall (4) - 9:47
Charles Lavigne (29 saves / 35 shots)		Goalie stats	Timo Pielmeier (25 saves / 26 shots)

Shawinigan won series 4 – 1

== QMJHL Championship ==
=== (1) Drummondville Voltigeurs vs. (5) Shawinigan Cataractes ===
May 1	Drummondville Voltigeurs	2 – 1	Shawinigan Cataractes	Centre Marcel Dionne
No scoring		First period	No scoring
17:38 - pp - Yannick Riendeau (20)		Second period	No scoring
11:30 - Yannick Riendeau (21)		Third period	Alex Grant (2) - 19:33
Marco Cousineau (37 saves / 38 shots)		Goalie stats	Timo Pielmeier (32 saves / 34 shots)

May 2	Drummondville Voltigeurs	3 – 5	Shawinigan Cataractes	Centre Marcel Dionne
18:51 - Mike Hoffman (18)		First period	No scoring
2:30 - Marc-Olivier Vachon (7); 8:23 - pp - Yannick Riendeau (22)		Second period	Adam Bourque-Leblanc (1) - 2:14; Cedric McNicoll (12) - 4:56; Matthew Pistilli (10) - 10:15; Cedric McNicoll (13) - pp - 16:25
No scoring		Third period	Alex Grant (3) - 7:46
Marco Cousineau (38 saves / 43 shots)		Goalie stats	Timo Pielmeier (30 saves / 33 shots)

May 5	Shawinigan Cataractes	4 – 5	Drummondville Voltigeurs	Centre Bionest
10:28 - pp - Cedric McNicoll (14)		First period	Ryan McKiernan (2) - 7:04; Dany Massé (12) - 19:17
9:30 - pp - Matthew Pistilli (11)		Second period	Yannick Riendeau (23) - pp - 11:38; Dany Massé (13) - 18:31
3:48 - pp - Matthew Pistilli (12); 18:51 - Cedric McNicoll (15)		Third period	Yannick Riendeau (24) - 17:32
Timo Pielmeier (24 saves / 29 shots)		Goalie stats	Marco Cousineau (27 saves / 31 shots)

May 6	Shawinigan Cataractes	2 – 9	Drummondville Voltigeurs	Centre Bionest
No scoring		First period	Dany Massé (14) - pp - 12:11
6:38 - Dave Labrecque (3)		Second period	Mike Hoffman (19) - pp - 4:12; Sean Couturier (1) - pp - 4:36; Yannick Riendeau (25) - 9:40; Yannick Riendeau (26) - 16:08; Dany Massé (15) - pp - 16:55
12:07 - pp - Maxime Legault (10)		Third period	Marc-Olivier Vachon (8) - pp - 2:02; Maxime Frenette (1) - pp - 3:50; Samson Mahbod (5) - pp - 5:32
Timo Pielmeier (12 saves / 16 shots); Gabriel Girard (17 saves / 22 shots)		Goalie stats	Marco Cousineau (22 saves / 24 shots)

May 8	Drummondville Voltigeurs	1 – 4	Shawinigan Cataractes	Centre Marcel Dionne
11:12 - pp - Mike Hoffman (20)		First period	No scoring
No scoring		Second period	Charles-Olivier Roussel (5) - pp - 4:10; Michaël Bournival (1) - 8:58; Maxime Macenauer (5) - sh - 10:40
No scoring		Third period	Philippe Paradis (6) - pp - 17:12
Marco Cousineau (23 saves / 27 shots)		Goalie stats	Gabriel Girard (31 saves / 32 shots)

May 10	Shawinigan Cataractes	2 – 1	OT	Drummondville Voltigeurs	Centre Bionest
No scoring		First period		No scoring
No scoring		Second period		Yannick Riendeau (27) - pp - 12:45
14:51 - pp - Cedric McNicoll (16)		Third period		No scoring
19:19 - Nick Petersen (10)		First overtime period		No scoring
Gabriel Girard (34 saves / 35 shots)		Goalie stats		Marco Cousineau (35 saves / 37 shots)

May 12	Drummondville Voltigeurs	3 – 2	Shawinigan Cataractes	Centre Marcel Dionne
10:38 - Yannick Riendeau (28); 14:52 - pp - Mike Hoffman (21)		First period	No scoring
2:52 - Yannick Riendeau (29)		Second period	Alex Grant (4) - pp - 1:20; Matthew Pistilli (13) - 5:11
No scoring		Third period	No scoring
Marco Cousineau (45 saves / 47 shots)		Goalie stats	Gabriel Girard (24 saves / 27 shots)

Drummondville won series 4 – 3

== Playoff scoring leaders ==
Note: GP = Games played; G = Goals; A = Assists; Pts = Points; PIM = Penalty minutes

Player	Team	GP	G	A	Pts	PIM
Yannick Riendeau	Drummondville Voltigeurs	19	29	23	52	16
Dany Massé	Drummondville Voltigeurs	19	15	20	35	18
Chris DiDomenico	Drummondville Voltigeurs	15	4	31	35	24
Mike Hoffman	Drummondville Voltigeurs	19	21	13	34	26
Cedric McNicoll	Shawinigan Cataractes	21	16	17	33	6
Pierre-Alexandre Vandall	Shawinigan Cataractes	21	4	19	23	16
Nick Petersen	Shawinigan Cataractes	21	10	12	22	22
Matthew Pistilli	Shawinigan Cataractes	21	13	7	20	4
Dmitri Kugryshev	Quebec Remparts	17	6	14	20	24
Dmitry Kulikov	Drummondville Voltigeurs	19	2	18	20	16

== Playoff leading goaltenders ==
Note: GP = Games played; Mins = Minutes played; W = Wins; L = Losses; GA = Goals Allowed; SO = Shutouts; SV& = Save percentage; GAA = Goals against average

Player	Team	GP	Mins	W	L	GA	SO	Sv%	GAA
Nicola Riopel	Moncton Wildcats	10	620	5	5	21	2	0.936	2.03
Antoine Tardif	Drummondville Voltigeurs	3	155	3	0	6	0	0.903	2.31
Olivier Roy	Cape Breton Screaming Eagles	11	739	7	4	30	0	0.910	2.43
Marco Cousineau	Drummondville Voltigeurs	17	1008	13	3	41	0	0.910	2.44
Gabriel Girard	Shawinigan Cataractes	5	268	3	1	11	0	0.914	2.46

== Canada Russia Challenge ==
The ADT Canada Russia Challenge is a six-game series featuring four teams: three from the Canadian Hockey League (CHL) versus Russia's National Junior hockey team. Within the Canadian Hockey League umbrella, one team from each of its three leagues — the Ontario Hockey League, Quebec Major Junior Hockey League, and Western Hockey League — compete in two games against the Russian junior team.

The ADT Canada Russia Challenge has become a highlight on the CHL schedule and we are very proud to be associated with it.
These two nations have such a storied hockey history that fans from across the country tune in expecting to see a hard fought series.
We expect nothing short of world class hockey this November that hockey fans from across the country won't want to miss.

— Joe O'Connell, Regional Vice-President of Canada

The 2008 ADT Canada Russia Challenge was held in six cities across Canada, with two cities for each league within the Canadian Hockey League. The series began on November 17, 2008, and concluded on November 27, 2008. All six games were televised nationally on Rogers Sportsnet, along with RDS televising both games from the Quebec Major Junior Hockey League.

Results

In the first game of the two part series between Team QMJHL and the Russian Selects, Team QMJHL scored five goals en route to a 5–3 win in front of 4,378 fans at Centre 200 in Sydney, Nova Scotia. Kmitri Kugryshev of the Russian Selects and goaltender Olivier Roy of Team QMJHL were named the ADT Players of the Game for their respective teams. The Russian Selects evened the ADT Canada Russia Challenge, winning the second game after having registered four goals in a 4–3 victory in front of a sellout crowd of 6,451 assembled at Harbour Station in Saint John, New Brunswick.

#	Date	Visitor	Score	Home	Attendance	Location	Recap
1	November 17, 2008	Russian Selects	3–5	Team QMJHL	4,378	Sydney, Nova Scotia
2	November 19, 2008	Russian Selects	4–3	Team QMJHL	6,451	Saint John, New Brunswick
3	November 20, 2008	Russian Selects	6–3	Team OHL	4,751	Guelph, Ontario
4	November 24, 2008	Russian Selects	2–3	Team OHL	3,145	St. Catharines, Ontario
5	November 26, 2008	Russian Selects	0–5	Team WHL	2,800	Swift Current, Saskatchewan
6	November 27, 2008	Russian Selects	1–2	Team WHL	2,749	Prince Albert, Saskatchewan

== Memorial Cup ==
The 91st MasterCard Memorial Cup was held in Rimouski, Quebec.

== All-star teams ==
First team

- Goaltender - Nicola Riopel, Moncton Wildcats
- Defence - Dmitry Kulikov, Drummondville Voltigeurs & Marc-André Bourdon, Rimouski Océanic
- Left winger - Mike Hoffman, Drummondville Voltigeurs
- Centreman - Cedric Lalonde-McNicoll, Shawinigan Cataractes
- Right winger - Yannick Riendeau, Drummondville Voltigeurs

Second team

- Goaltender - Charles Lavigne, Quebec Remparts
- Defence - Charles-Olivier Roussel, Shawinigan Cataractes & Sébastien Piché, Rimouski Océanic
- Left winger - Paul Byron, Gatineau Olympiques
- Centreman - Dany Massé, Drummondville Voltigeurs
- Right winger - Nicholas Petersen, Shawinigan Cataractes

Rookie team

- Goaltender - Christopher Holden, Cape Breton Screaming Eagles
- Defence - Dmitri Kulikov, Drummondville Voltigeurs & Brandon Gormley, Moncton Wildcats
- Left winger - Sergey Ostapchuk, Rouyn-Noranda Huskies
- Centreman - Ben Duffy, P.E.I. Rocket
- Right winger - Dmitri Kugryshev, Quebec Remparts

== Trophies and awards ==
Team

- President's Cup - Playoff Champions: Drummondville Voltigeurs
- Jean Rougeau Trophy - Regular Season Champions: Drummondville Voltigeurs
- Luc Robitaille Trophy - Team that scored the most goals: Drummondville Voltigeurs
- Robert Lebel Trophy - Team with best GAA: Moncton Wildcats

Player

- Michel Brière Memorial Trophy - Most Valuable Player: Nicola Riopel, Moncton Wildcats
- Jean Béliveau Trophy - Top Scorer: Yannick Riendeau, Drummondville Voltigeurs
- Guy Lafleur Trophy - Playoff MVP : Yannick Riendeau, Drummondville Voltigeurs
- Jacques Plante Memorial Trophy - Best GAA: Nicola Riopel, Moncton Wildcats
- Guy Carbonneau Trophy - Best Defensive Forward: Jean-Philip Chabot, Gatineau Olympiques
- Emile Bouchard Trophy - Defenceman of the Year: Dmitri Kulikov, Drummondville Voltigeurs
- Kevin Lowe Trophy - Best Defensive Defenceman: Maxime Ouimet, Rimouski Oceanic
- Mike Bossy Trophy - Best Pro Prospect: Dmitri Kulikov, Drummondville Voltigeurs
- RDS Cup - Rookie of the Year: Dmitri Kulikov, Drummondville Voltigeurs
- Michel Bergeron Trophy - Offensive Rookie of the Year: Dmitri Kugryshev, Quebec Remparts
- Raymond Lagacé Trophy - Defensive Rookie of the Year: Dmitri Kulikov, Drummondville Voltigeurs
- Frank J. Selke Memorial Trophy - Most sportsmanlike player: Cedric Lalonde-McNicoll, Shawinigan Cataractes
- QMJHL Humanitarian of the Year - Humanitarian of the Year: Matthew Pistilli, Shawinigan Cataractes
- Marcel Robert Trophy - Best Scholastic Player: Payton Liske, Saint John Sea Dogs
- Paul Dumont Trophy - Personality of the Year: Guy Boucher, Drummondville Voltigeurs

Executive

- Ron Lapointe Trophy - Coach of the Year: Danny Flynn, Moncton Wildcats
- Maurice Filion Trophy - General Manager of the Year: Dominic Ricard, Drummondville Voltigeurs
- John Horman Trophy - Executive of the Year: Louis Painchaud, Quebec Remparts
- Jean Sawyer Trophy - Marketing Director of the Year: Sylvie Fortier, Drummondville Voltigeurs

== See also ==
- 2009 Memorial Cup
- List of QMJHL seasons
- 2008–09 OHL season
- 2008–09 WHL season
- 2008 NHL entry draft
- 2008 in ice hockey
- 2009 in ice hockey

Preceded by 2007–08 QMJHL season	QMJHL seasons	Succeeded by 2009–10 QMJHL season
