= Grachyov =

Grachyov or Grachev (Russian: Грачёв) may refer to

- Grachyov (surname)
- Grachev (crater)
- Grachev (rural locality), several rural localities in Russia
