= Robert Slaney =

Robert Slaney may refer to:

- Robert Aglionby Slaney (1791–1862), British barrister and Whig politician from Shropshire
- Robert Slaney (ice hockey) (born 1988), Canadian ice hockey left winger
