= Maxime Legault =

Canadian ice hockey player

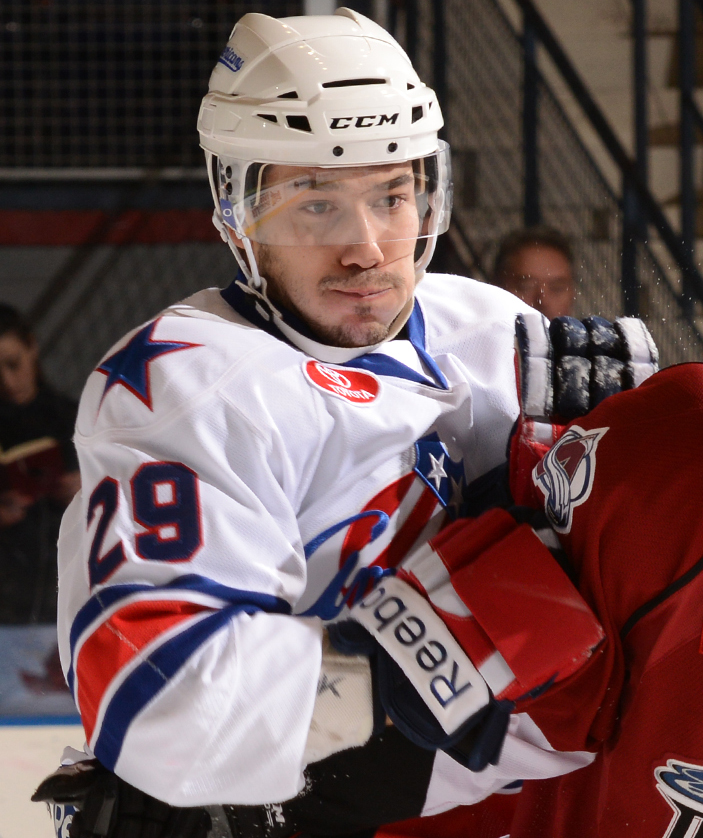
- Legault with the Rochester Americans in 2012
- Born: March 28, 1989 (age 37) Mont-Tremblant, Quebec, Canada
- Height: 6 ft 2 in (188 cm)
- Weight: 196 lb (89 kg; 14 st 0 lb)
- Position: Right wing
- Shoots: Right
- Magnus team Former teams: Boxers de Bordeaux; Portland Pirates; Rochester Americans; Lausitzer Füchse; Gothiques d'Amiens; Brûleurs de Loups
- NHL draft: 194th overall, 2009; Buffalo Sabres
- Playing career: 2009–present

Maxime Legault (born March 28, 1989) is a Canadian ice hockey player who is currently playing for Boxers de Bordeaux in the French Ligue Magnus. He was originally selected by the Buffalo Sabres in the seventh round (194th overall) of the 2009 NHL entry draft.

== Playing career ==
On Oct. 10, 2009, Legault made his professional debut with the Portland Pirates, but appeared in only five games during the 2009–10 season for the AHL team before being returned to the Cape Breton Screaming Eagles of the Quebec Major Junior Hockey League. Legault played the full 2010–11 season in the AHL, getting into 67 regular season games and 9 playoff games with the Pirates.

On August 2, 2011, the Buffalo Sabres announced that Legault was re-signed to a two-year AHL contract with the Rochester Americans.

After playing with the Americans, he joined the Gwinnett Gladiators in the ECHL for the 2013–14 season.

On May 30, 2016, Legault left North America as a free agent and opted for a second stint in Europe, agreeing to a one-year deal with French Ligue Magnus outfit, Gothiques d'Amiens.

== Career statistics ==
			Regular season					Playoffs
Season	Team	League	GP	G	A	Pts	PIM	GP	G	A	Pts	PIM
2006–07	Shawinigan Cataractes	QMJHL	55	7	12	19	98	4	0	0	0	4
2007–08	Shawinigan Cataractes	QMJHL	31	6	4	10	61	—	—	—	—	—
2008–09	Shawinigan Cataractes	QMJHL	63	28	16	44	66	21	10	3	13	23
2009–10	Shawinigan Cataractes	QMJHL	22	10	10	20	29	—	—	—	—	—
2009–10	Portland Pirates	AHL	5	0	0	0	4	—	—	—	—	—
2009–10	Cape Breton Screaming Eagles	QMJHL	21	7	12	19	25	5	1	0	1	4
2010–11	Portland Pirates	AHL	67	12	12	24	83	9	1	1	2	8
2011–12	Rochester Americans	AHL	62	8	9	17	19	3	0	1	1	2
2012–13	Rochester Americans	AHL	60	11	7	18	26	1	0	0	0	0
2013–14	Gwinnett Gladiators	ECHL	66	17	25	42	58	—	—	—	—	—
2014–15	Lausitzer Füchse	DEL2	42	20	16	36	86	3	1	0	1	0
2015–16	Norfolk Admirals	ECHL	30	4	2	6	16	—	—	—	—	—
2016–17	Gothiques d'Amiens	FRA	32	6	8	14	95	5	0	1	1	16
2017–18	Brûleurs de Loups	FRA	40	9	16	25	95	12	2	2	4	27
2018–19	Brûleurs de Loups	FRA	26	15	7	22	57	15	6	0	6	18
2019–20	Brûleurs de Loups	FRA	2	0	0	0	2	2	0	0	0	2
2020–21	Brûleurs de Loups	FRA	21	7	8	15	43	—	—	—	—	—
2021–22	Boxers de Bordeaux	FRA	29	12	11	23	10	—	—	—	—	—
2022–23	Boxers de Bordeaux	FRA	40	21	10	31	58	4	1	0	1	0
2023–24	Boxers de Bordeaux	FRA	26	10	5	15	13	18	4	6	10	4
AHL totals			194	31	28	59	132	13	1	2	3	10
