= Mikaël Tam =

Canadian ice hockey player

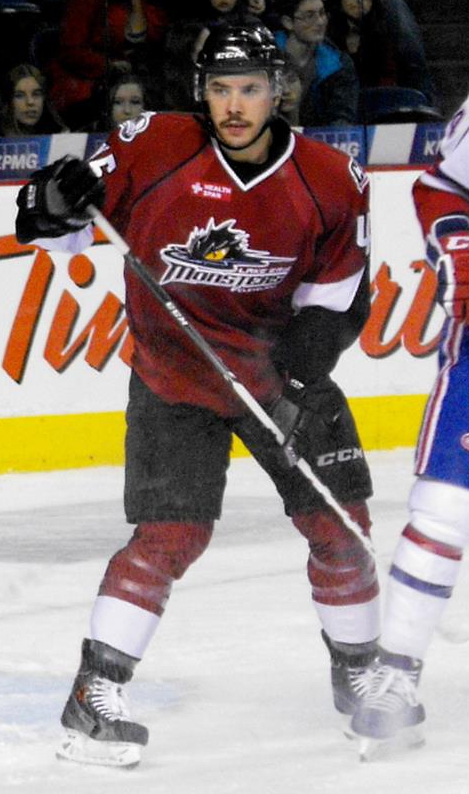
- Tam with the Lake Erie Monsters in 2013
- Born: April 26, 1991 (age 35) Quebec City, Quebec, Canada
- Height: 5 ft 11 in (180 cm)
- Weight: 205 lb (93 kg; 14 st 9 lb)
- Position: Defence
- Shot: Left
- Played for: Worcester Sharks; San Francisco Bulls; Lake Erie Monsters; Sparta Warriors; Bakersfield Condors; Kunlun Red Star; HK Poprad
- NHL draft: Undrafted
- Playing career: 2012–2022

Mikaël Tam (born April 26, 1991) is a Canadian former professional ice hockey defenceman.

== Playing career ==
Tam played five seasons (2007–2012) in the Quebec Major Junior Hockey League (QMJHL) with the Quebec Remparts, scoring 53 goals and 87 assists for 140 points, while earning 454 penalty minutes, in 318 games played.

While playing with the Remparts on January 17, 2010, Patrice Cormier of the Rouyn-Noranda Huskies hit Tam with a hard elbow to the jaw, knocking him unconscious to the ice where he started to convulse. Tam was taken from the game on a stretcher to the hospital where he was treated for brain trauma, a concussion, and broken teeth. The images of Tam convulsing on the ice received wide television coverage, and Cormier was suspended by the QMJHL for the 20 remaining regular season games, plus the playoffs.

On October 8, 2012, the Worcester Sharks of the AHL signed Tam for the 2012–13 season. Tam played 19 AHL games for the Sharks and 37 ECHL games for their affiliate the San Francisco Bulls as well as playing in the ECHL playoffs for the Bulls.

Tam signed with the Lake Erie Monsters of the AHL for the 2013–14 season. Tam also attended the Colorado Avalanche NHL training camp, but was released back to the Monsters on September 16, 2013. Tam began the season with the Monsters, however finished the season in the Central Hockey League playoffs with the Avalanche's secondary affiliate, the Denver Cutthroats.

On September 3, 2014, Tam remained affiliated with the Avalanche and Monsters, in signing a one-year contract with new ECHL affiliate, the Fort Wayne Komets. In the 2014–15 season, Tam suffered a long-term injury after just two games with the Komets, and was limited to just 17 regular season games before contributing with 7 assists in 12 games in the post-season.

On July 24, 2015, Tam opted to pursue a European career, signing a one-year contract as a free agent with Norwegian club, Sparta Warriors of the GET-ligaen. In the 2015–16 season, Tam responded to his first season abroad in recording professional highs with 16 points in 42 games from the blueline with the Warriors.

Tam left Norway in the off-season, returning to the AHL in signing a one-year deal with the Bakersfield Condors, an affiliate to the Edmonton Oilers, on August 18, 2016. In the 2016–17 season, Tam saw limited action with the Condors appearing in just 2 games despite prolonged time on the playing roster. He was reassigned to ECHL affiliate, the Norfolk Admirals, on numerous occasions, appearing in 36 games for 22 points.

On May 29, 2017, Tam returned abroad in securing a one-year deal with Chinese club, HC Kunlun Red Star of the KHL.

Tam played three seasons in China within the Kunlun Red Star organization, before returning to North America as a free agent during the COVID-19 pandemic. On December 16, 2020, Tam agreed to extend his professional career in returning to the ECHL with the Rapid City Rush.

Following a lone season with the Rush, Tam returned to China for a second tenure with Kunlun Red Star of the KHL on July 24, 2021.

== Career statistics ==
| | | | Regular season | | | | | Playoffs |
| Season | Team | League | GP | G | A | Pts | PIM | GP | G | A | Pts | PIM |
|---|---|---|---|---|---|---|---|---|---|---|---|---|
| 2007–08 | Quebec Remparts | QMJHL | 64 | 1 | 10 | 11 | 106 | 11 | 0 | 4 | 4 | 21 |
| 2008–09 | Quebec Remparts | QMJHL | 68 | 8 | 10 | 18 | 101 | 17 | 4 | 6 | 10 | 14 |
| 2009–10 | Quebec Remparts | QMJHL | 50 | 10 | 13 | 23 | 51 | 9 | 3 | 3 | 6 | 8 |
| 2010–11 | Quebec Remparts | QMJHL | 68 | 19 | 26 | 45 | 90 | 18 | 3 | 5 | 8 | 30 |
| 2011–12 | Quebec Remparts | QMJHL | 68 | 15 | 28 | 43 | 106 | 11 | 1 | 4 | 5 | 21 |
| 2012–13 | Worcester Sharks | AHL | 19 | 0 | 1 | 1 | 31 | — | — | — | — | — |
| 2012–13 | San Francisco Bulls | ECHL | 37 | 3 | 9 | 12 | 75 | 5 | 0 | 0 | 0 | 8 |
| 2013–14 | Lake Erie Monsters | AHL | 34 | 1 | 5 | 6 | 67 | — | — | — | — | — |
| 2013–14 | Denver Cutthroats | CHL | 14 | 2 | 7 | 9 | 16 | 14 | 3 | 3 | 6 | 14 |
| 2014–15 | Fort Wayne Komets | ECHL | 17 | 1 | 3 | 4 | 10 | 12 | 0 | 7 | 7 | 7 |
| 2015–16 | Sparta Warriors | GET | 42 | 6 | 10 | 16 | 69 | 6 | 1 | 2 | 3 | 43 |
| 2016–17 | Bakersfield Condors | AHL | 2 | 0 | 0 | 0 | 0 | — | — | — | — | — |
| 2016–17 | Norfolk Admirals | ECHL | 36 | 9 | 13 | 22 | 30 | — | — | — | — | — |
| 2017–18 | KRS Heilongjiang | VHL | 33 | 3 | 5 | 8 | 62 | — | — | — | — | — |
| 2018–19 | KRS-ORG | VHL | 43 | 4 | 8 | 12 | 68 | — | — | — | — | — |
| 2018–19 | Kunlun Red Star | KHL | 5 | 0 | 0 | 0 | 6 | — | — | — | — | — |
| 2019–20 | KRS-BSU | VHL | 35 | 5 | 5 | 10 | 24 | — | — | — | — | — |
| 2019–20 | Kunlun Red Star | KHL | 11 | 0 | 0 | 0 | 12 | — | — | — | — | — |
| 2020–21 | Rapid City Rush | ECHL | 66 | 2 | 17 | 19 | 30 | — | — | — | — | — |
| 2021–22 | Kunlun Red Star | KHL | 19 | 1 | 2 | 3 | 15 | — | — | — | — | — |
| 2021–22 | HK Poprad | Slovak | 11 | 1 | 0 | 1 | 8 | 7 | 0 | 0 | 0 | 8 |
| AHL totals | | | 53 | 1 | 6 | 7 | 98 | — | — | — | — | — |
| KHL totals | | | 35 | 1 | 2 | 3 | 33 | — | — | — | — | — |
