= David Gilbert (ice hockey) =

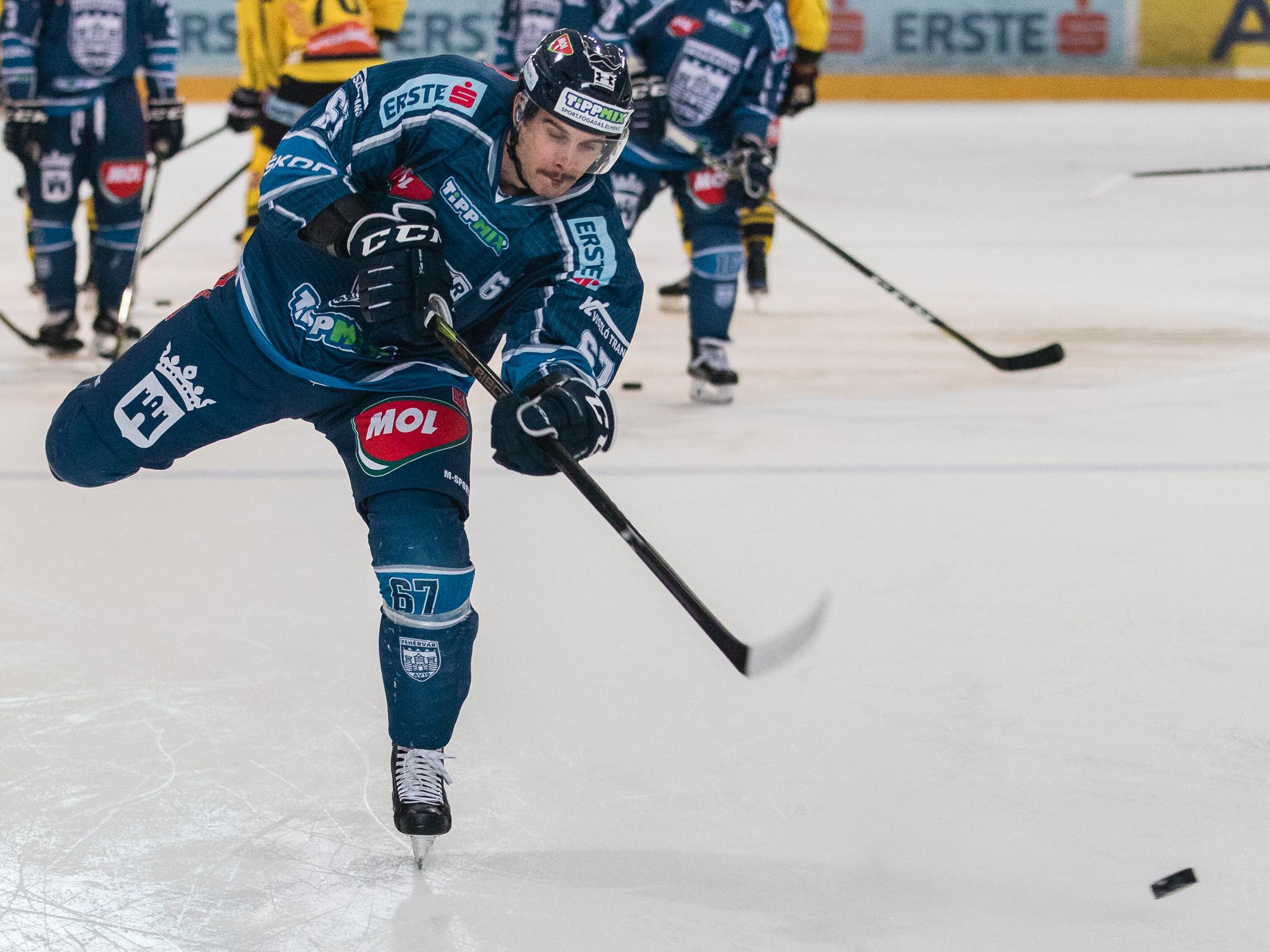
- Gilbert with Fehérvár AV19 in 2017.
- Born: February 9, 1991 (age 35) Châteauguay, Quebec, Canada
- Height: 6 ft 2 in (188 cm)
- Weight: 185 lb (84 kg; 13 st 3 lb)
- Position: Centre
- Shoots: Left
- Magnus team Former teams: Dragons de Rouen; Rockford IceHogs; Motor Ceske Budejovice
- NHL draft: 209th overall, 2009; Chicago Blackhawks
- Playing career: 2010–present

David Gilbert (born February 9, 1991) is a Canadian professional ice hockey player who is currently under contract to Belfast Giants of the Elite Ice Hockey League (EIHL). He previously played with the Dragons de Rouen of the French Ligue Magnus and the Rockford IceHogs of the American Hockey League (AHL). Gilbert was selected by the Chicago Blackhawks in the 7th round (209th overall) of the 2009 NHL entry draft.

== Playing career ==
Gilbert played four seasons (2007-2011) of major junior hockey in the Quebec Major Junior Hockey League (QMJHL) where he scored 70 goals and 86 assists for 156 points in 209 games played. In 2009 Gilbert was selected to play in the CHL Top Prospects Game.

Gilbert made his professional debut in the American Hockey League with the Rockford IceHogs during the 2009–10 season. On May 31, 2011, the Chicago Blackhawks signed Gilbert to a three-year entry-level contract.

On August 19, 2014, the Orlando Solar Bears of the ECHL announced that they had signed Gilbert as an unrestricted free agent. After attending AHL affiliate, the Toronto Marlies training camp, Gilbert was traded prior to the 2014–15 season, by the Solar Bears to the Wheeling Nailers on October 16, 2014.

A free agent following the 2015–16 season with the Kalamazoo Wings, Gilbert signed abroad in France, agreeing to a one-year deal with Boxers de Bordeaux of the Magnus on July 18, 2016.

From the 2022 season, Gilbert signed with the Belfast Giants in the EIHL while he studies for a Master of Business Administration from the Ulster University Business School.

== Career statistics ==
			Regular season						-	Playoffs
Season	Team	League	GP	G	A	Pts	PIM	+/-	-	GP	G	A	Pts	PIM
2006-07	College Antoine-Girouard Gaulois	QMAAA	44	19	26	45	10	—	-	4	2	1	3	2
2007-08	College Antoine-Girouard Gaulois	QMAAA	29	29	24	53	54	—	-	—	—	—	—	—
2007–08	Quebec Remparts	QMJHL	28	7	7	14	12	-5	-	11	1	0	1	2
2007-08	Canada Quebec U17	WHC-17	5	3	0	3	4	—	-	—	—	—	—	—
2008–09	Quebec Remparts	QMJHL	67	11	32	43	24	14	-	17	6	2	8	11
2009–10	Quebec Remparts	QMJHL	31	6	12	18	15	-3	-	—	—	—	—	—
2009–10	Acadie–Bathurst Titan	QMJHL	31	18	12	30	22	-6	-	5	5	2	7	6
2009–10	Rockford IceHogs	AHL	1	0	1	1	0	0	-	—	—	—	—	—
2010–11	Acadie–Bathurst Titan	QMJHL	52	28	23	51	39	22	-	4	2	1	3	0
2010–11	Rockford IceHogs	AHL	5	2	1	3	2	3	-	—	—	—	—	—
2011–12	Rockford IceHogs	AHL	28	1	4	5	13	-4	-	—	—	—	—	—
2011–12	Toledo Walleye	ECHL	29	6	12	18	18	-3	-	—	—	—	—	—
2012–13	Rockford IceHogs	AHL	10	1	2	3	6	0	-	—	—	—	—	—
2012–13	Bloomington Blaze	CHL	49	21	19	40	22	-8	-	—	—	—	—	—
2013–14	Rockford IceHogs	AHL	10	1	0	1	0	-5	-	—	—	—	—	—
2013–14	Toledo Walleye	ECHL	44	17	18	35	29	-17	-	—	—	—	—	—
2014–15	Wheeling Nailers	ECHL	64	19	21	40	40	-4	-	7	3	2	5	8
2015–16	Kalamazoo Wings	ECHL	62	16	18	34	28	1	-	5	0	1	1	2
2016–17	Boxers de Bordeaux	Magnus	42	30	24	54	59	16	-	11	3	6	9	4
2017–18	Fehérvár AV19	EBEL	49	15	16	31	22	-1	-	—	—	—	—	—
2018–19	HC Ceske Budejovice	CZE2	54	20	26	46	42	25	-	11	1	2	3	26
2019–20	HC Ceske Budejovice	CZE2	45	16	22	38	81	19	-	—	—	—	—	—
2020–21	HC Ceske Budejovice	CZE	31	4	5	9	34	-14	-	—	—	—	—	—
2021-22	Dragons de Rouen	Ligue Magnus	39	25	21	46	14	17	-	13	3	4	7	0
2022-2023	Belfast Giants	EIHL	41	4	8	12	6	8	-	—	—	—	—	—
CZE totals			31	4	5	9	34		-	—	—	—	—	—
