= Grachyov (surname) =

Grachyov, feminine: Grachyova (Russian: Грачёв, Грачёва), is a Russian-language family name derived from the word grach, "rook" (bird), it may also be transliterated as Grachov, Grachova, Grachev, Gracheva; Gratchev, Gratcheva, Gratshev, Gratsheva. Its Ukrainian-language counterpart: Hrachov. It may refer to:

- Alexander Grachev (born 1984), Russian ice dancer
- Boris Grachev (born 1986), Russian chess grandmaster
- Denis Grachev (fighter) (born 1982), Russian boxer, kickboxer and mixed martial artist
- Denis Grachev (badminton) (born 1992), Russian badminton player
- Dmitri Grachyov (born 1983), Russian football player
- Evgeny Grachyov (born 1990), Russian ice hockey centreman
- Konstantin Grachev (born 1927), Russian sprinter
- Maxim Gratchev (born 1988), Russian ice hockey player
- Nadezhda Gracheva (born 1969), Russian ballerina and ballet teacher
- Pavel Grachev (1948–2012), Russian general and the Defence Minister
- Tatyana Gracheva (born 1973), Russian volleyball player.
- Vadim Grachyov (1932–1994), Russian actor
- Vadim Gratshev (1963–2006), Russian palaeoentomologist
- Varvara Gracheva (born 2000), Russian tennis player
- Viacheslav Grachev (born 1973), Russian rugby union player
- Vladimir Grachev (born 1942), Russian scientist, statesman and ecologist
- Vitaliy Vladasovich Grachyov (born 1979), a.k.a. Vitas - Russian Singer/Songwriter/Actor/Fashion Designer
