= Matthew Pistilli =

Canadian ice hockey player

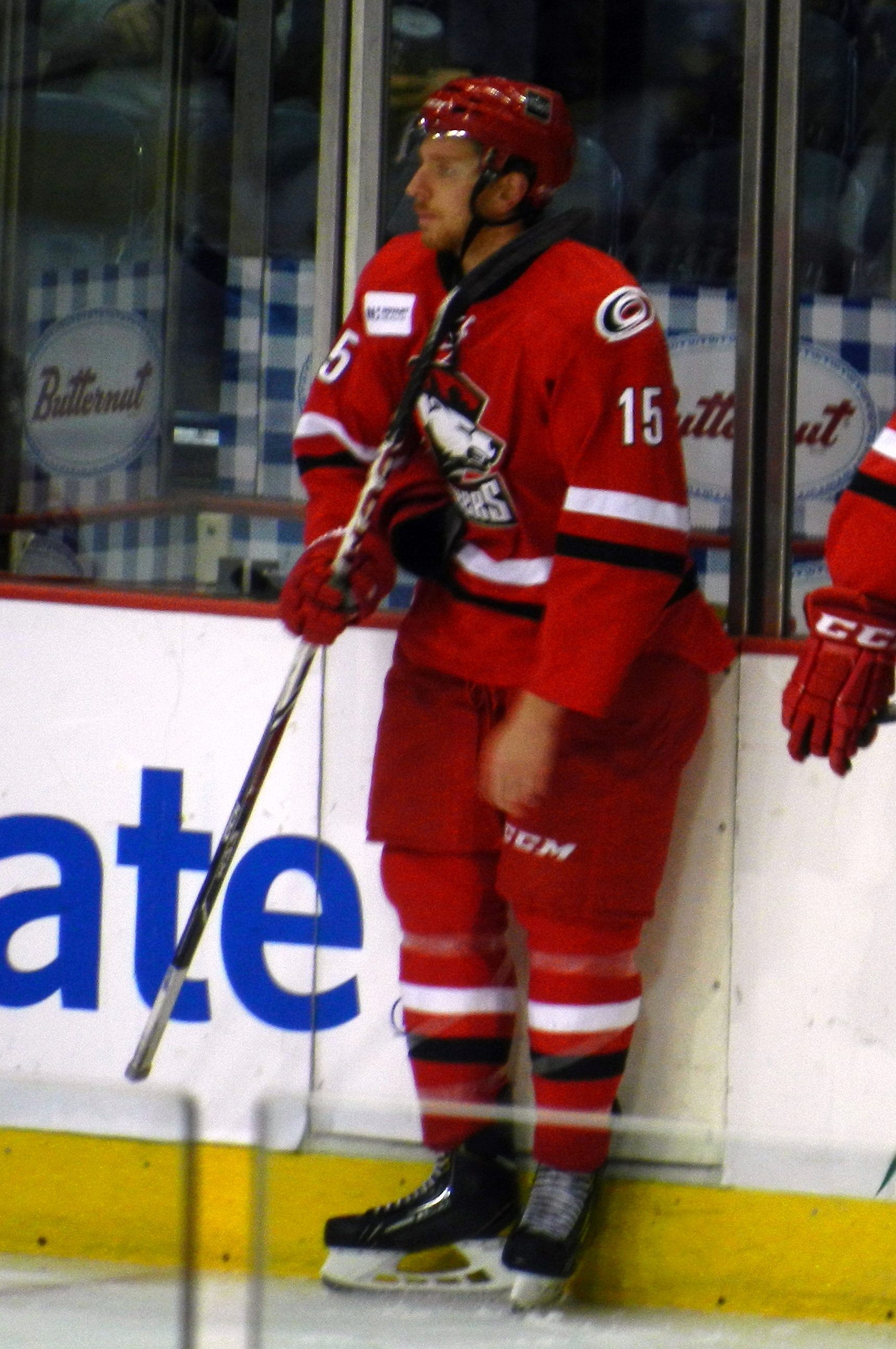
- Pistilli with the Charlotte Checkers in 2013
- Born: October 17, 1988 (age 37) Montreal, Quebec, Canada
- Height: 6 ft 2 in (188 cm)
- Weight: 219 lb (99 kg; 15 st 9 lb)
- Position: Right wing
- Shoots: Right
- DEL2 team Former teams: Löwen Frankfurt; Albany River Rats; Charlotte Checkers; Bridgeport Sound Tigers; Norfolk Admirals; Esbjerg Energy
- NHL draft: Undrafted
- Playing career: 2009–present

Matthew Pistilli (born October 17, 1988) is a Canadian professional ice hockey player who is currently playing for Stuttgart Rebels in the German 3rd League.

== Playing career ==
Undrafted from the Quebec Major Junior Hockey League, on May 20, 2009, he was signed as a free agent by the Carolina Hurricanes to a three-year entry-level contract.

After spending three years within the Hurricanes' organizational affiliate's, Pistilli was signed without an extension to a one-year ECHL contract with the South Carolina Stingrays on September 21, 2012. During the 2012–13 season, Pistilli compiled 23 points in 35 games for the Stingrays before he was traded back to the Everblades as part of a deal for Matt Beca on December 31, 2012.

On September 8, 2014, Pistilli moved to his third ECHL club, in agreeing to a standard player contract with the Fort Wayne Komets. After a bright start to the 2014–15 season with the Komets, producing 13 points in 12 games, Pistilli returned to the AHL in signing a professional try-out contract with the Norfolk Admirals on November 17, 2014.

On July 15, 2015, with the Komets unable to match interest abroad, Pistilli agreed to a one-year contract with Danish club, Esbjerg Energy of the Metal Ligaen. He was a key part of Esbjerg's championship-winning campaign, playing 45 times in the regular season, tallying 22 goals and 40 assists, and recording five goals as well as eleven assists in 19 playoff contests on the way to the title.

Pistilli moved to Germany for the 2016-17 season, joining DEL2 side Löwen Frankfurt. He was the league's leading goal scorer in the 2016-17 regular season, tallying 32 goals in 51 contests.

== Career statistics ==
			Regular season					Playoffs
Season	Team	League	GP	G	A	Pts	PIM	GP	G	A	Pts	PIM
2004–05	Shawinigan Cataractes	QMJHL	2	1	1	2	6	—	—	—	—	—
2005–06	Shawinigan Cataractes	QMJHL	34	5	5	10	20	—	—	—	—	—
2005–06	Gatineau Olympiques	QMJHL	32	10	13	23	16	17	2	2	4	8
2006–07	Gatineau Olympiques	QMJHL	65	22	29	51	44	5	1	1	2	2
2007–08	Gatineau Olympiques	QMJHL	63	37	56	93	51	19	11	17	28	14
2008–09	Shawinigan Cataractes	QMJHL	63	45	41	86	37	21	13	7	20	4
2009–10	Florida Everblades	ECHL	11	2	2	4	4	8	3	6	9	2
2009–10	Albany River Rats	AHL	41	5	3	8	10	—	—	—	—	—
2010–11	Florida Everblades	ECHL	27	15	16	31	12	—	—	—	—	—
2010–11	Charlotte Checkers	AHL	50	8	11	19	15	5	0	1	1	0
2011–12	Charlotte Checkers	AHL	73	12	13	25	24	—	—	—	—	—
2012–13	South Carolina Stingrays	ECHL	35	8	15	23	21	—	—	—	—	—
2012–13	Florida Everblades	ECHL	39	17	35	52	26	13	4	6	10	2
2012–13	Charlotte Checkers	AHL	3	0	0	0	0	—	—	—	—	—
2013–14	Florida Everblades	ECHL	31	17	23	40	30	—	—	—	—	—
2013–14	Charlotte Checkers	AHL	21	4	7	11	13	—	—	—	—	—
2013–14	Bridgeport Sound Tigers	AHL	13	1	3	4	0	—	—	—	—	—
2014–15	Fort Wayne Komets	ECHL	58	21	35	56	24	12	6	3	9	6
2014–15	Norfolk Admirals	AHL	10	1	2	3	4	—	—	—	—	—
AHL totals			211	31	39	70	66	5	0	1	1	0

== Awards and honours ==
- QMJHL Humanitarian of the Year (2008–09)
- CHL Humanitarian of the Year (2008–09)
