= Yannick Riendeau =

Canadian ice hockey player

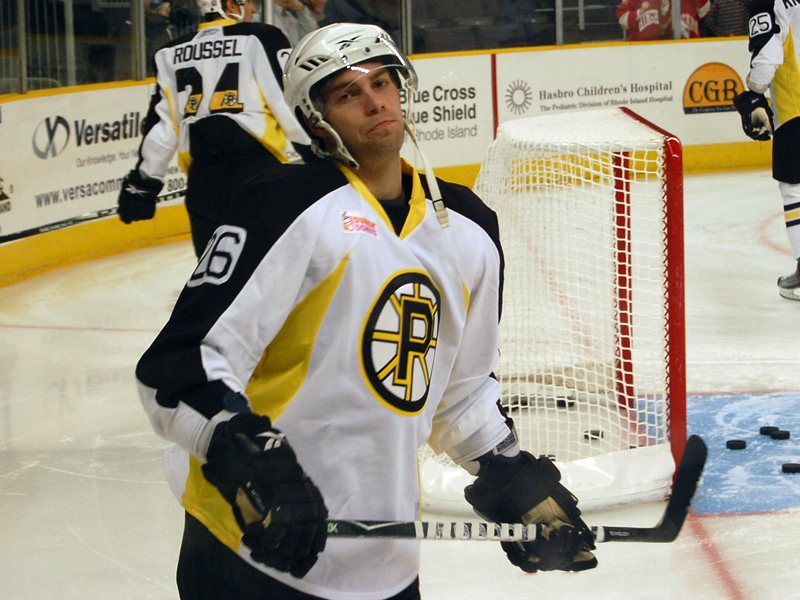
- Riendeau with the Providence Bruins in 2010
- Born: June 18, 1988 (age 38) Boucherville, Quebec, Canada
- Height: 5 ft 10 in (178 cm)
- Weight: 178 lb (81 kg; 12 st 10 lb)
- Position: Right wing
- Shot: Left
- Played for: Providence Bruins
- NHL draft: Undrafted
- Playing career: 2007–2022

Yannick Riendeau (born June 18, 1988) is a Canadian former professional ice hockey winger who played in the American Hockey League (AHL).

== Playing career ==
On April 2, 2009 he was signed as a free agent by the Boston Bruins.

On February 27, 2012, Riendeau was traded from the Boston Bruins along with Marc Cantin to the New York Islanders in exchange for Brian Rolston and Mike Mottau. Riendeau played for the Islanders minor league team, the Bridgeport Sound Tigers

== Notable awards and honours ==
- CHL Top Scorer Award (2008–09)
- George Parsons Trophy (Memorial Cup Most Sportsmanlike Player) (2008–09)
- Jean Beliveau Trophy (QMJHL Leading scorer) (2008–09)
- QMJHL First All-Star Team (2008–09)
- Guy Lafleur Trophy (2008–09)

== Career statistics ==
=== Regular season and playoffs ===
			Regular season					Playoffs
Season	Team	League	GP	G	A	Pts	PIM	GP	G	A	Pts	PIM
2004–05	Rouyn-Noranda Huskies	QMJHL	58	10	15	25	22	6	0	1	1	0
2005–06	Rouyn-Noranda Huskies	QMJHL	67	27	38	65	40	5	0	2	2	6
2006–07	Rouyn-Noranda Huskies	QMJHL	67	32	40	72	38	10	9	5	14	6
2007–08	Rouyn-Noranda Huskies	QMJHL	42	23	26	49	18	17	8	13	21	14
2008–09	Drummondville Voltigeurs	QMJHL	64	58	68	126	31	19	29	23	52	16
2009–10	Providence Bruins	AHL	22	1	4	5	6	—	—	—	—	—
2009–10	Reading Royals	ECHL	6	3	2	5	0	—	—	—	—	—
2010–11	Providence Bruins	AHL	6	0	0	0	2	—	—	—	—	—
2010–11	Reading Royals	ECHL	54	18	25	43	24	8	5	3	8	2
2011–12	Providence Bruins	AHL	18	3	3	6	4	—	—	—	—	—
2011–12	Reading Royals	ECHL	43	13	32	45	20	5	1	2	3	0
2012–13	Stockton Thunder	ECHL	42	14	30	44	28	—	—	—	—	—
2013–14	Dragons de Rouen	Ligue Magnus	25	17	16	33	10	–	–	–	–	–
