= Jean-Philip Chabot =

Canadian ice hockey player

- Born: March 31, 1988 (age 36); Quebec City, Quebec, Canada
- Height: 6 ft 1 in (185 cm)
- Weight: 196 lb (89 kg; 14 st 0 lb)
- Position: Centre
- Shoots: Left
- France.2 team Former teams: Anglet Hormadi Élite; Charlotte Checkers; Bakersfield Condors; Arizona Sundogs; Denver Cutthroats; Rapid City Rush; Stockton Thunder
- NHL draft: Undrafted
- Playing career: 2009–present

Jean-Philip Chabot (born March 31, 1988) is a Canadian professional ice hockey centre who is currently playing with the Anglet Hormadi Élite of the FFHG Division 1, the second tier level of France.

Undrafted, Chabot played major junior hockey in the Quebec Major Junior Hockey League with the Moncton Wildcats and the Gatineau Olympiques. In his successful junior career he Captained the Olympiques to the QMJHL Championships in the 2007–08 season.

He had established himself professionally playing with the Denver Cutthroats in the CHL since the 2012–13 season. Having agreed to return for a third season with the Cutthroats, on August 20, 2014, the team suspended operations, effective immediately, releasing Chabot as a free agent. On August 28, he joined his third CHL club, in agreeing to a one-year contract with the Rapid City Rush.

== Career statistics ==
			Regular season					Playoffs
Season	Team	League	GP	G	A	Pts	PIM	GP	G	A	Pts	PIM
2003–04	Lévis Commandeurs	QMAAA	42	18	20	38	40	—	—	—	—	—
2004–05	Lévis Commandeurs	QMAAA	42	18	24	42	56	18	15	15	30	10
2004–05	Moncton Wildcats	QMJHL	2	0	0	0	0	—	—	—	—	—
2005–06	Moncton Wildcats	QMJHL	60	13	14	27	48	20	4	4	8	21
2006–07	Gatineau Olympiques	QMJHL	70	24	26	50	59	5	1	1	2	6
2007–08	Gatineau Olympiques	QMJHL	70	38	19	57	53	19	14	8	22	27
2008–09	Gatineau Olympiques	QMJHL	67	33	43	76	70	10	7	6	13	20
2009–10	Charlotte Checkers	ECHL	58	8	17	25	52	—	—	—	—	—
2010–11	Bakersfield Condors	ECHL	10	1	1	2	7	—	—	—	—	—
2010–11	Saint-Georges Cool FM	LNAH	27	3	8	11	36	—	—	—	—	—
2011–12	Arizona Sundogs	CHL	63	22	22	44	162	—	—	—	—	—
2012–13	Denver Cutthroats	CHL	62	10	12	22	145	5	0	0	0	4
2013–14	Denver Cutthroats	CHL	65	20	12	32	151	16	5	2	7	26
2014–15	Rapid City Rush	ECHL	32	8	1	9	75	—	—	—	—	—
2014–15	Stockton Thunder	ECHL	29	2	3	5	72	—	—	—	—	—
CHL totals			190	52	46	98	458	21	5	2	7	30

== Awards and honours ==
Award	Year
QMJHL
Champions (Gatineau Olympiques)	2007–08
Guy Carbonneau Trophy	2008–09
