= Cedric McNicoll =

Canadian ice hockey player

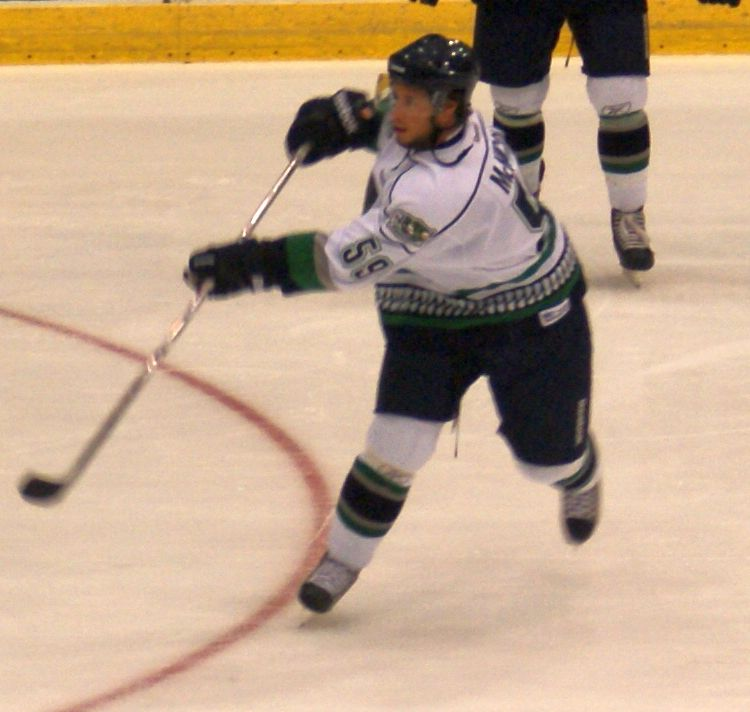
- McNicoll with the Florida Everblades in 2012
- Born: August 28, 1988 (age 37) Longueuil, Quebec, Canada
- Height: 5 ft 10 in (178 cm)
- Weight: 178 lb (81 kg; 12 st 10 lb)
- Position: Center
- Shot: Left
- Played for: Lake Erie Monsters; Albany River Rats; Charlotte Checkers
- NHL draft: Undrafted
- Playing career: 2009–2013

Cedric Lalonde-McNicoll (born August 28, 1988) is a Canadian former professional ice hockey player who played with McGill University in the Canadian Interuniversity Sports (CIS). He last played professionally with the Florida Everblades of the ECHL, then as a prospect of the Carolina Hurricanes.

== Playing career ==
=== Junior ===
Undrafted, McNicoll played Major junior hockey in the QMJHL with the Shawinigan Cataractes. Despite his small stature, McNicoll was an offensive force with the Cataractes since his debut at the end of the 2004-05 season. In 2007–08, despite being passed over in the NHL entry draft, his offensive prowess increased to 43 goals and 83 points in 69 games, earning him the Frank J. Selke Memorial Trophy as the QMJHL and CHL Sportsman of the year.

Prior to the 2008–09 season, McNicoll was invited to the Pittsburgh Penguins training camp. Earning interest from the NHL, he returned to Shawinigan and finished third in QMJHL scoring resulting in a nomination as the QMJHL MVP. McNicoll reached the 100 point milestone in the last week of the regular season, scoring 7 points in 3 games to earn him CHL player of the week honors. In the playoffs McNicoll finished was 33 points in 21 games suffering a seven-game defeat to the Drummondville Voltigeurs in the QMJHL finals. He was named to the QMJHL First All-Star team and was awarded the QMJHL and CHL Sportsman of the Year Award for the second consecutive year.

=== Professional ===
At the tail end of his final season with Shawinigan, McNicoll was signed by the Colorado Avalanche to a three-year entry-level contract on March 6, 2009. After attending the Avalanche's training camp, he was assigned to AHL affiliate, the Lake Erie Monsters, to begin his first professional season in 2009–10. On December 30, 2009, McNicoll scored his first professional career goal with the Monsters in a 5–4 comeback victory against the Peoria Rivermen. He also added an assist and a shootout goal to be named first star of the game. Scoring a modest 13 point in 45 games with the Monsters, he was reassigned to ECHL affiliate the Charlotte Checkers before he was traded by the Avalanche, along with a sixth round pick, to the Carolina Hurricanes for Stephane Yelle and Harrison Reed on March 3, 2010. Cedric was assigned to the Albany River Rats of the AHL before finishing his whirlwind year with ECHL affiliate, the Florida Everblades.

At the conclusion of his entry-level contract, despite being the top scorer for the Everblades in the playoffs with 21 points to claim the Kelly Cup, McNicoll opted to halt his professional career by accepting a scholarship to McGill University. As a mandatory condition, McNicoll sat out the 2012–13 season and focused on his studies before joining the Redmen, scoring 35 points in 23 games in the 2013–14 season.

== Career statistics ==
| | | | Regular season | | | | | Playoffs |
| Season | Team | League | GP | G | A | Pts | PIM | GP | G | A | Pts | PIM |
|---|---|---|---|---|---|---|---|---|---|---|---|---|
| 2004–05 | Shawinigan Cataractes | QMJHL | 1 | 0 | 1 | 1 | 0 | 1 | 0 | 0 | 0 | 0 |
| 2005–06 | Shawinigan Cataractes | QMJHL | 67 | 13 | 17 | 30 | 34 | 10 | 1 | 7 | 8 | 2 |
| 2006–07 | Shawinigan Cataractes | QMJHL | 47 | 16 | 30 | 46 | 14 | 4 | 4 | 1 | 5 | 0 |
| 2007–08 | Shawinigan Cataractes | QMJHL | 69 | 43 | 40 | 83 | 20 | 5 | 0 | 8 | 8 | 6 |
| 2008–09 | Shawinigan Cataractes | QMJHL | 65 | 38 | 66 | 104 | 22 | 21 | 16 | 17 | 33 | 6 |
| 2009–10 | Lake Erie Monsters | AHL | 45 | 5 | 8 | 13 | 10 | — | — | — | — | — |
| 2009–10 | Charlotte Checkers | ECHL | 3 | 1 | 3 | 4 | 0 | — | — | — | — | — |
| 2009–10 | Albany River Rats | AHL | 7 | 2 | 0 | 2 | 0 | — | — | — | — | — |
| 2009–10 | Florida Everblades | ECHL | 5 | 1 | 3 | 4 | 0 | 6 | 0 | 2 | 2 | 0 |
| 2010–11 | Florida Everblades | ECHL | 29 | 7 | 17 | 24 | 8 | — | — | — | — | — |
| 2010–11 | Charlotte Checkers | AHL | 15 | 6 | 8 | 14 | 2 | — | — | — | — | — |
| 2011–12 | Charlotte Checkers | AHL | 17 | 1 | 2 | 3 | 6 | — | — | — | — | — |
| 2011–12 | Florida Everblades | ECHL | 32 | 15 | 15 | 30 | 12 | 18 | 4 | 17 | 21 | 8 |
| 2013–14 | McGill University | CIS | 23 | 15 | 20 | 35 | 8 | — | — | — | — | — |
| 2014–15 | McGill University | CIS | 25 | 11 | 23 | 34 | 8 | — | — | — | — | — |
| AHL totals | | | 84 | 14 | 18 | 32 | 18 | — | — | — | — | — |

== Awards ==
QMJHL

| Award | Year(s) |
|---|---|
| Frank J. Selke Memorial Trophy | 2008, 2009 |
| First All-Star Team | 2009 |
| Best Plus/Minus | 2009 |

CHL

| Award | Year(s) |
|---|---|
| Sportsman of the Year | 2008, 2009 |
