= Dmitri Kugryshev =

Russian ice hockey player (born 1990)

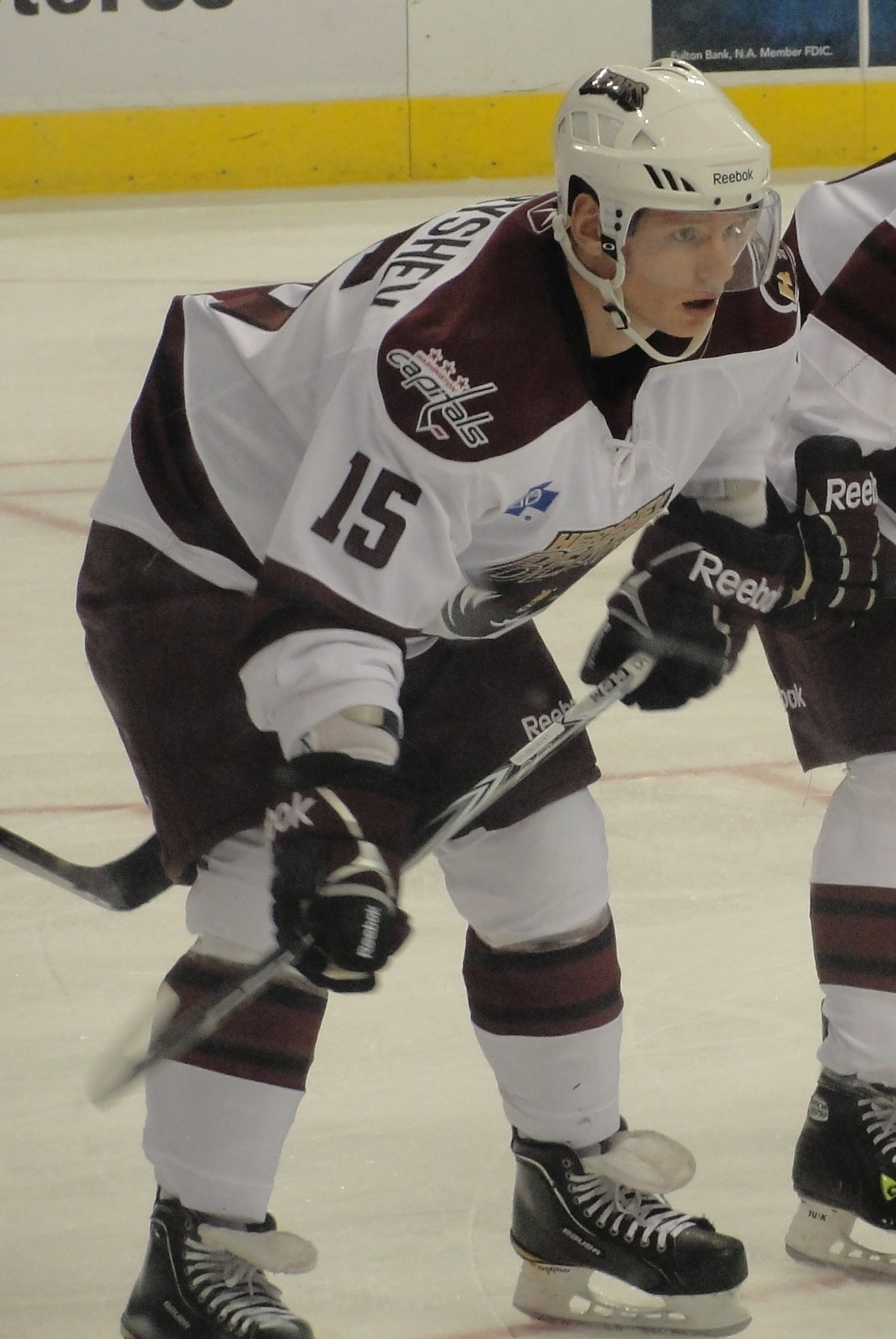
- Kugryshev with the Hershey Bears in 2010
- Born: 18 January 1990 (age 36) Balakovo, Russian SFSR, Soviet Union
- Height: 5 ft 11 in (180 cm)
- Weight: 193 lb (88 kg; 13 st 11 lb)
- Position: Forward
- Shoots: Right
- KHL team Former teams: Lada Togliatti; Hershey Bears; CSKA Moscow; Sibir Novosibirsk; Avangard Omsk; Salavat Yulaev Ufa; Spartak Moscow; HC Vityaz
- NHL draft: 58th overall, 2008; Washington Capitals
- Playing career: 2010–present

Dmitri Dmitrievich Kugryshev (Russian: Дмитрий Дмитриевич Кугрышев; born 18 January 1990) is a Russian professional ice hockey forward. He is currently playing with HC Lada Togliatti in the Kontinental Hockey League (KHL).

== Playing career ==
Kugryshev was selected by the Washington Capitals in the 2nd round (58th overall) of the 2008 NHL entry draft. He originally pursued his NHL ambition in transitioning to a major junior career in North America with the Quebec Remparts of the Quebec Major Junior Hockey League before signing a three-year entry-level contract with the Capitals on March 9, 2010.

At the completion of the 2016–17 season, Kugryshev alongside Semyon Koshelyov was traded by CSKA to Avangard Omsk in exchange for Anton Burdasov on May 2, 2017.

After spending the 2017–18 season, with Avangard posting 11 goals and 25 points in 50 games, Kugryshev left as a free agent to sign a one-year deal with Salavat Yulaev Ufa on May 1, 2018.

On 8 July 2021, Kugryshev joined his fifth KHL outfit, in agreeing to a two-year contract as a free agent with HC Spartak Moscow.

During his final season under contract with Spartak Moscow in 2022–23, in collecting just 2 goals and 3 points in 17 games, Kugryshev was transferred from Spartak to divisional rivals, HC Vityaz, on 21 November 2022.

After playing out the remainder of his contract with Vityaz, Kugrshev left the club in the off-season. As a free agent, Kugryshev opted to join Lada Togliatti for their return to the KHL, by signing a one-year contract for the 2023–24 season on 19 June 2023.

== Personal life ==
Kugryshev married Yana Kudryavtseva, an Olympic rhythmic gymnast, in 2018. They have two daughters : Eva, born on 25 December 2018 and Zoya, born on 29 August 2020.

== Career statistics ==
=== Regular season and playoffs ===
| | | | Regular season | | | | | Playoffs |
| Season | Team | League | GP | G | A | Pts | PIM | GP | G | A | Pts | PIM |
|---|---|---|---|---|---|---|---|---|---|---|---|---|
| 2005–06 | CSKA-2 Moscow | RUS-3 | 3 | 0 | 1 | 1 | 6 | — | — | — | — | — |
| 2006–07 | CSKA-2 Moscow | RUS-3 | 33 | 13 | 16 | 29 | 24 | — | — | — | — | — |
| 2007–08 | CSKA-2 Moscow | RUS-3 | 29 | 25 | 25 | 50 | 60 | 7 | 5 | 6 | 11 | 8 |
| 2008–09 | Quebec Remparts | QMJHL | 57 | 34 | 40 | 74 | 38 | — | — | — | — | — |
| 2009–10 | Quebec Remparts | QMJHL | 66 | 29 | 58 | 87 | 52 | 9 | 4 | 6 | 10 | 8 |
| 2010–11 | Hershey Bears | AHL | 64 | 6 | 8 | 14 | 10 | — | — | — | — | — |
| 2010–11 | South Carolina Stingrays | ECHL | 3 | 0 | 1 | 1 | 2 | — | — | — | — | — |
| 2011–12 | CSKA Moscow | KHL | 41 | 4 | 5 | 9 | 24 | 2 | 0 | 0 | 0 | 0 |
| 2011–12 | Krasnaya Armiya | MHL | 10 | 7 | 6 | 13 | 6 | 13 | 12 | 6 | 18 | 26 |
| 2012–13 | CSKA Moscow | KHL | 34 | 1 | 5 | 6 | 6 | 7 | 1 | 2 | 3 | 2 |
| 2013–14 | HC Sibir Novosibirsk | KHL | 54 | 15 | 15 | 30 | 34 | 10 | 3 | 3 | 6 | 0 |
| 2014–15 | HC Sibir Novosibirsk | KHL | 49 | 17 | 29 | 46 | 51 | 16 | 2 | 6 | 8 | 2 |
| 2015–16 | CSKA Moscow | KHL | 57 | 16 | 18 | 34 | 16 | 6 | 1 | 0 | 1 | 0 |
| 2016–17 | CSKA Moscow | KHL | 52 | 12 | 13 | 25 | 12 | 2 | 0 | 1 | 1 | 0 |
| 2017–18 | Avangard Omsk | KHL | 50 | 11 | 14 | 25 | 10 | 7 | 2 | 2 | 4 | 2 |
| 2018–19 | Salavat Yulaev Ufa | KHL | 58 | 16 | 16 | 32 | 2 | 17 | 1 | 6 | 7 | 10 |
| 2019–20 | Salavat Yulaev Ufa | KHL | 58 | 15 | 19 | 34 | 8 | 6 | 2 | 2 | 4 | 2 |
| 2020–21 | Salavat Yulaev Ufa | KHL | 57 | 9 | 22 | 31 | 43 | 9 | 1 | 0 | 1 | 2 |
| 2021–22 | Spartak Moscow | KHL | 42 | 4 | 13 | 17 | 8 | 5 | 1 | 0 | 1 | 2 |
| 2022–23 | Spartak Moscow | KHL | 17 | 2 | 1 | 3 | 2 | — | — | — | — | — |
| 2022–23 | HC Vityaz | KHL | 32 | 5 | 6 | 11 | 14 | 5 | 0 | 0 | 0 | 0 |
| 2023–24 | Lada Togliatti | KHL | 67 | 13 | 19 | 32 | 18 | 5 | 0 | 2 | 2 | 0 |
| 2024–25 | Lada Togliatti | KHL | 65 | 13 | 21 | 34 | 14 | — | — | — | — | — |
| 2025–26 | Lada Togliatti | KHL | 61 | 9 | 24 | 33 | 20 | — | — | — | — | — |
| KHL totals | | | 794 | 162 | 240 | 402 | 282 | 97 | 14 | 24 | 38 | 22 |

=== International ===
| Year | Team | Event | Result | GP | G | A | Pts | PIM |
|---|---|---|---|---|---|---|---|---|
| 2007 | Russia | WJC18 | 1st place, gold medalist(s) | 7 | 2 | 4 | 6 | 4 |
| 2007 | Russia | IH18 | 3rd place, bronze medalist(s) | 4 | 1 | 1 | 2 | 6 |
| 2008 | Russia | WJC18 | 2nd place, silver medalist(s) | 3 | 2 | 1 | 3 | 4 |
| 2008 | Russia | WJC | 3rd place, bronze medalist(s) | 7 | 1 | 3 | 4 | 4 |
| 2009 | Russia | WJC | 3rd place, bronze medalist(s) | 7 | 1 | 1 | 2 | 6 |
| Junior totals | | | | 28 | 7 | 10 | 17 | 24 |

== Awards and honours ==
| Award | Year |
|---|---|
QMJHL
| Michel Bergeron Trophy | 2009 |
| All-Rookie Team | 2009 |
| CHL All-Rookie Team | 2009 |
