= Hrachov =

Hrachov (Ukrainian: Грачов), feminine: Hrachova is a Ukrainian-language surname, a Ukrainization of the Russian surname Grachyov derived from the word грач, "rook". (The native Ukrainian surname would be Hrakiv, from the word грак.) Notable people with the surname include:

- Dmytro Hrachov (born 1983), Ukrainian archer
- Hlib Hrachov (born 1997), Ukrainian football player
- Viktor Hrachov (born 1956), Ukrainian footballer and manager
- Volodymyr Hrachov (born 1997), Ukrainian football player

== See also ==
- Hrachová, Czech and Slovak surname of different etymology: derived from the word hrach/hrách, "pea"
