= Grachev (rural locality) =

Grachev/Grachyov (Russian: Грачев/Грачёв) is the name of several rural localities in Russia:

- Grachev, Belgorod Oblast, a khutor in Veydelevsky District of Belgorod Oblast
- Grachyov, Bokovsky District, Rostov Oblast, a khutor in Grachyovskoye Rural Settlement of Bokovsky District in Rostov Oblast
- Grachev, Krasnosulinsky District, Rostov Oblast, a khutor in Mikhaylovskoye Rural Settlement of Krasnosulinsky District in Rostov Oblast
