= Grachyov, Bokovsky District, Rostov Oblast =

Rural locality in Bokovsky District, Rostov Oblast, Russia

Coordinates: 49°24′40″N 41°32′05″E

Grachyov (Russian: Грачёв) is a khutor in Bokovsky District, Rostov Oblast, Russia. Its full official name is муниципальное образование «Грачёвское сельское поселение» (municipal entity "Grachyovskoye Rural Settlement").

Situated by the river Chir, khutor Grachyov has existed since 1773.
