= Robert Slaney (ice hockey) =

Canadian ice hockey player

- Born: October 13, 1988 (age 37) Upper Island Cove, Newfoundland, Canada
- Height: 6 ft 2 in (188 cm)
- Weight: 228.4 lb (104 kg; 16 st 4 lb)
- Position: Left wing
- Shot: Left
- Played for: Toronto Marlies; Milwaukee Admirals; Hamilton Bulldogs
- NHL draft: Undrafted
- Playing career: 2009–2015

Robert Slaney (born October 13, 1988) is a Canadian former professional ice hockey left winger. He most recently played for the Hamilton Bulldogs of the American Hockey League (AHL).

== Career ==
After starting his career in the Toronto Maple Leafs organization, Slaney was traded with Brett Lebda to the Nashville Predators for Matthew Lombardi and Cody Franson on July 3, 2011. He was then traded, along with Blake Geoffrion and a second round pick, to the Montreal Canadiens for defenseman Hal Gill and a conditional fifth round draft pick.

== Career statistics ==
			Regular season					Playoffs
Season	Team	League	GP	G	A	Pts	PIM	GP	G	A	Pts	PIM
2005–06	Cape Breton Screaming Eagles	QMJHL	54	3	4	7	21	7	0	3	3	4
2006–07	Cape Breton Screaming Eagles	QMJHL	58	13	12	25	67	15	5	5	10	8
2007–08	Cape Breton Screaming Eagles	QMJHL	64	26	29	55	63	11	6	3	9	10
2008–09	Cape Breton Screaming Eagles	QMJHL	63	36	45	81	78	7	5	4	9	18
2009–10	Toronto Marlies	AHL	34	0	6	6	15	—	—	—	—	—
2009–10	Reading Royals	ECHL	22	1	10	11	22	—	—	—	—	—
2010–11	Reading Royals	ECHL	61	7	17	24	34	4	1	3	4	0
2010–11	Toronto Marlies	AHL	9	0	1	1	2	—	—	—	—	—
2011–12	Milwaukee Admirals	AHL	9	0	1	1	2	—	—	—	—	—
2011–12	Cincinnati Cyclones	ECHL	31	11	7	18	23	—	—	—	—	—
2011–12	Hamilton Bulldogs	AHL	21	3	1	4	4	—	—	—	—	—
AHL totals			73	3	9	12	23	—	—	—	—	—
