= Mathieu Tousignant =

Canadian ice hockey player

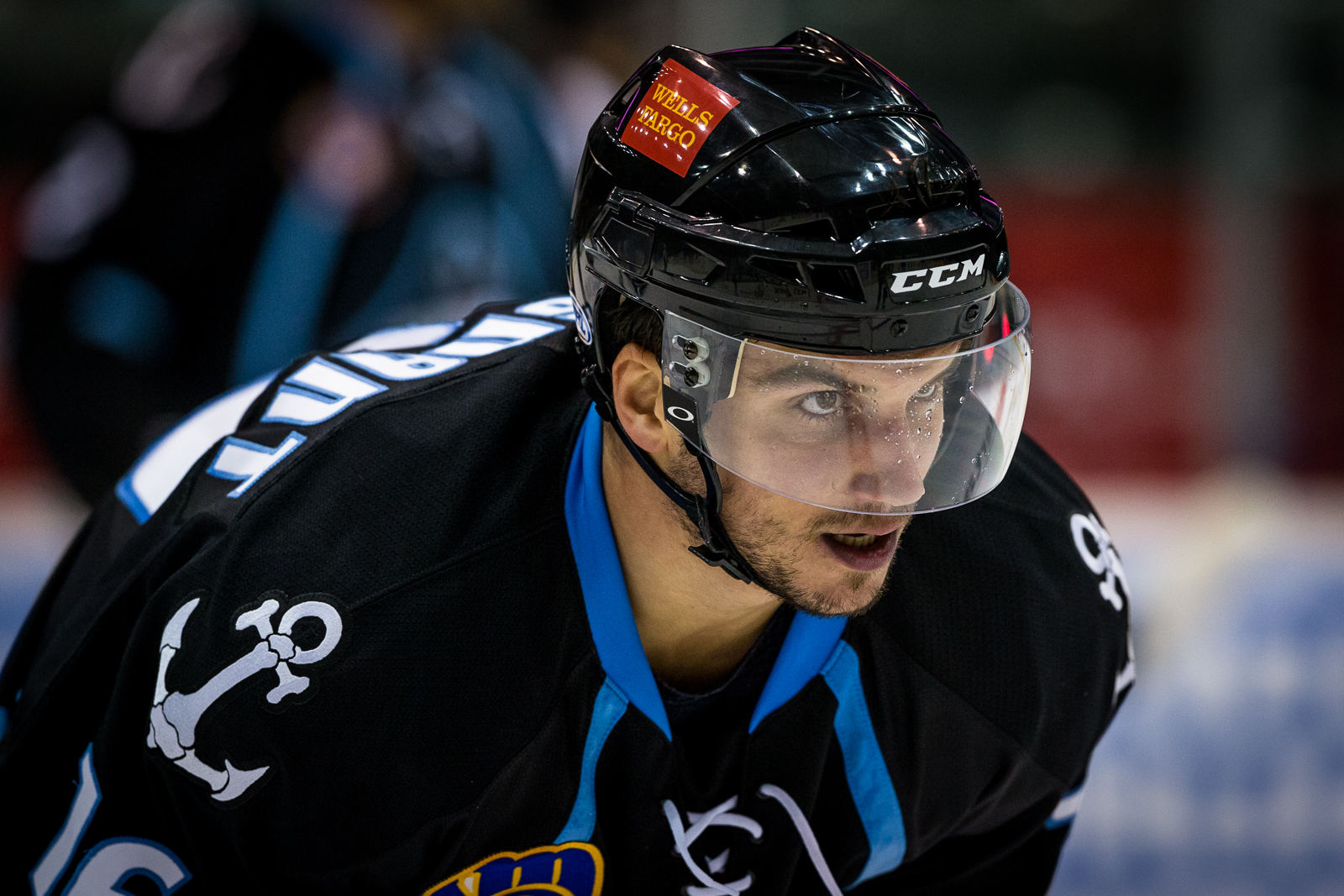
- Born: November 21, 1989 (age 36) Saint-Étienne-de-Lauzon, Quebec, Canada
- Height: 6 ft 0 in (183 cm)
- Weight: 185 lb (84 kg; 13 st 3 lb)
- Position: Centre
- Shoots: Left
- Oberliga team Former teams: Saale Bulls Halle; Texas Stars; St. John's IceCaps; Milwaukee Admirals; Adirondack Flames; Ravensburg Towerstars; Tingsryds AIF; Löwen Frankfurt; DVTK Jegesmedvék; HSC Csíkszereda; Nottingham Panthers
- NHL draft: Undrafted
- Playing career: 2009–present

Mathieu Tousignant (born November 21, 1989) is a Canadian professional ice hockey player currently signed to German Oberliga side Saale Bulls Halle. Tousignant was most recently with Elite Ice Hockey League (EIHL) side Nottingham Panthers and previously played for Löwen Frankfurt of the German DEL2.

== Playing career ==
On March 24, 2010, Tousignant was signed as an undrafted free agent by the Dallas Stars to a three-year entry-level contract. He was assigned to AHL affiliate, the Texas Stars for the majority of his tenure with the Stars.

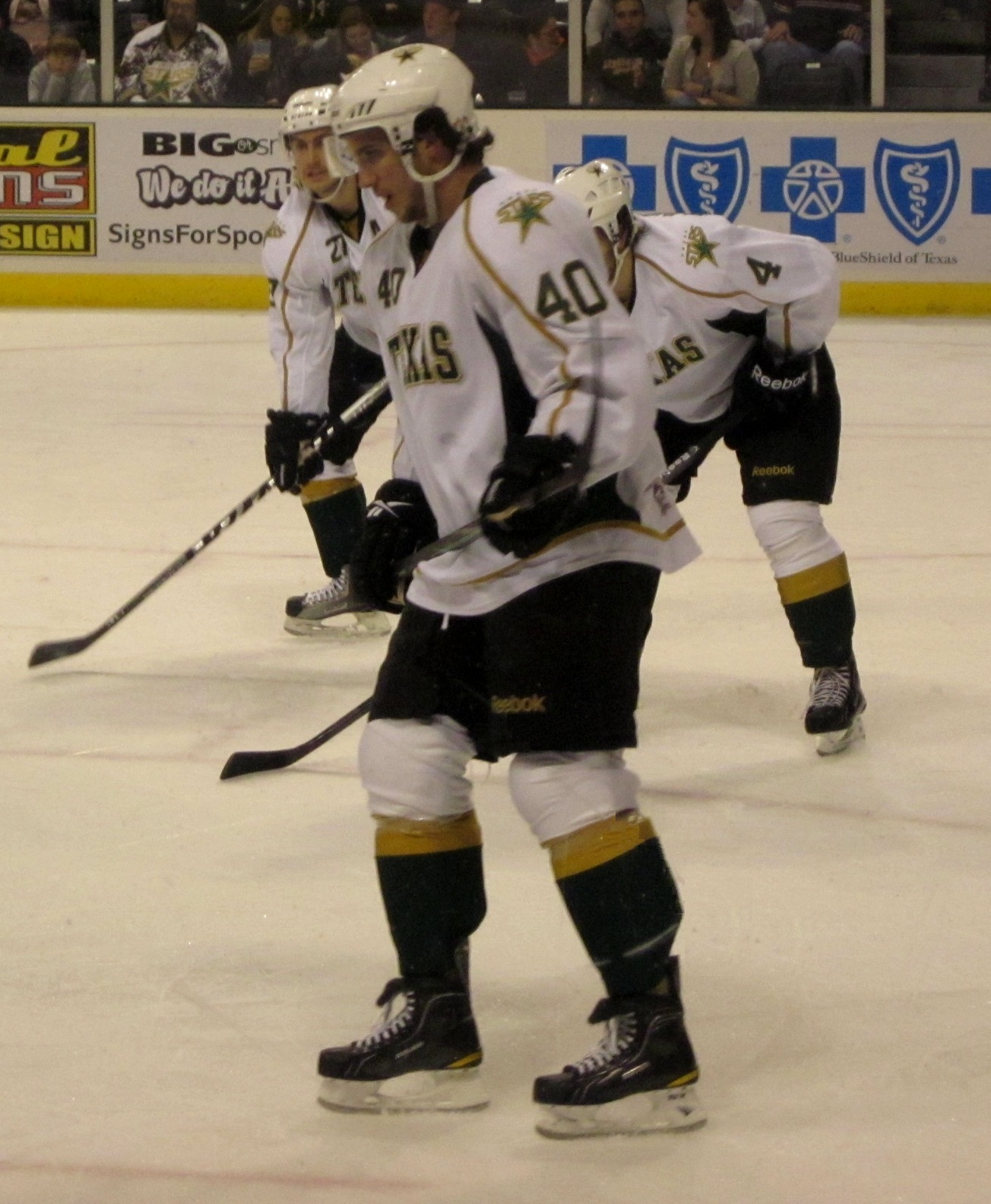
Mathieu Tousignant

On August 16, 2013, Tousignant signed a one-year contract as a free agent to remain in the AHL with the Milwaukee Admirals.

On July 3, 2014, Tousignant left the Admirals after one season to sign as a free agent on a one-year contract with the Adirondack Flames an affiliate of the Calgary Flames. In the 2014–15 season, Tousignant was a fixture amongst the forward group's checking line, appearing in 70 games for 5 goals and 19 points.

With the Flames relocating AHL affiliate at the conclusion of the season, Tousignant left the AHL as a free agent and signed a contract with German club., Ravensburg Towerstars of the DEL2 on August 21, 2015.

After spells with Tingsryds AIF, Löwen Frankfurt and DVTK Jegesmedvék, Tousignant signed for Nottingham Panthers of the UK Elite Ice Hockey League in January 2020.

In August 2020, Tousignant moved to Erste Liga side HSC Csíkszereda, but he returned to Nottingham ahead of the 2021-22 Elite League season.

In June 2022, Tousignant signed terms with German Oberliga side Saale Bulls Halle ahead of the 2022-23 campaign.
