= Toni Ritter =

German ice hockey player (born 1990)

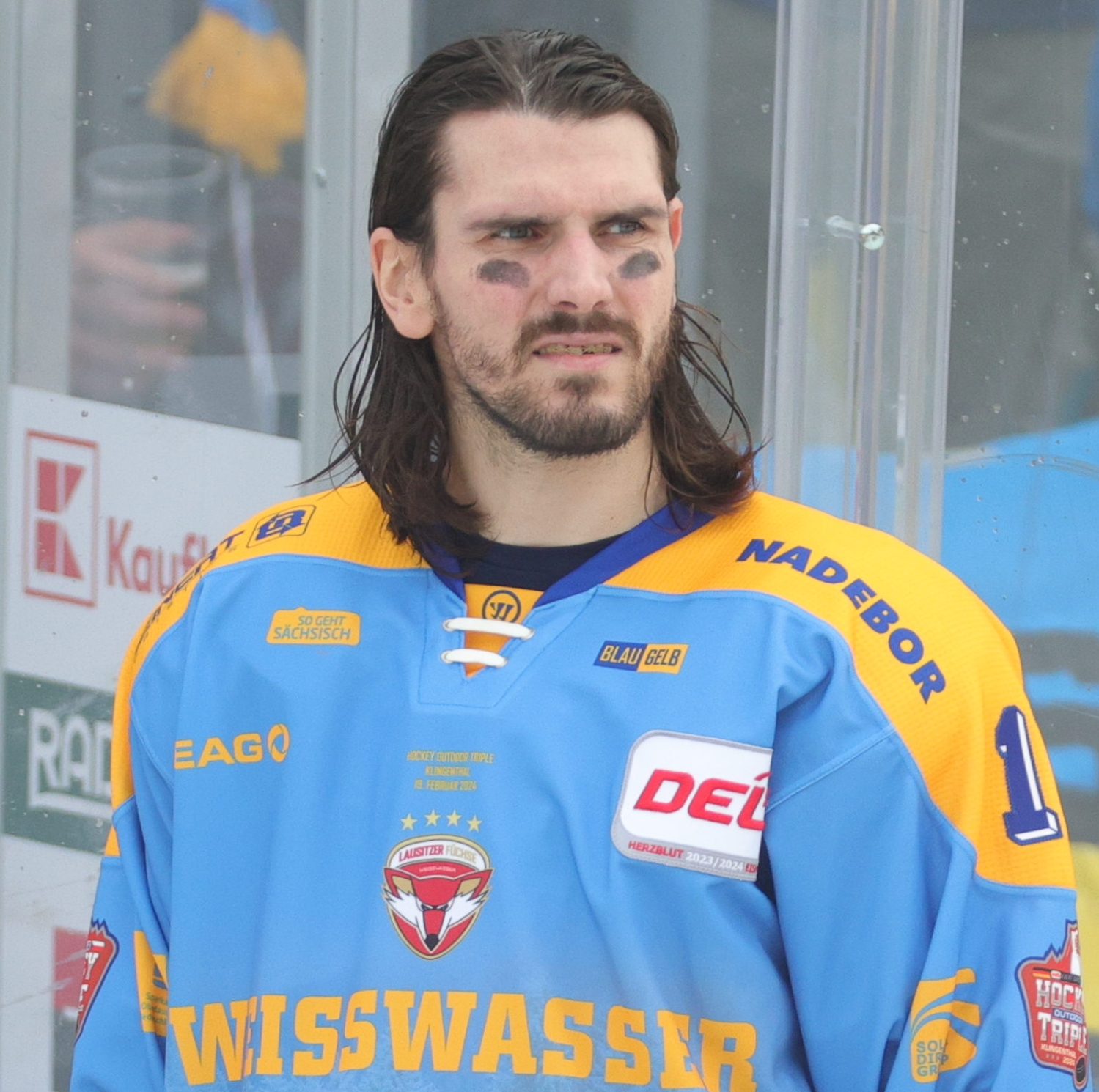
- Born: February 6, 1990 (age 35); Bad Muskau, East Germany
- Height: 6 ft 3 in (191 cm)
- Weight: 196 lb (89 kg; 14 st 0 lb)
- Position: Forward
- Shoots: Left
- DEL2 team Former teams: Dresdner Eislöwen; Adler Mannheim; Krefeld Pinguine; Iserlohn Roosters; EHC München; Schwenninger Wild Wings
- NHL draft: Undrafted
- Playing career: 2008–present

Toni Ritter (born February 6, 1990) is a German professional ice hockey player who is currently playing for the Dresdner Eislöwen in the DEL2.

He previously played in the Deutsche Eishockey Liga with the Adler Mannheim, Krefeld Pinguine, Iserlohn Roosters and EHC Red Bull München before signing a one-year contract with Schwenninger Wild Wings on April 18, 2015.
