= Maxim Gratchev =

Russian ice hockey player

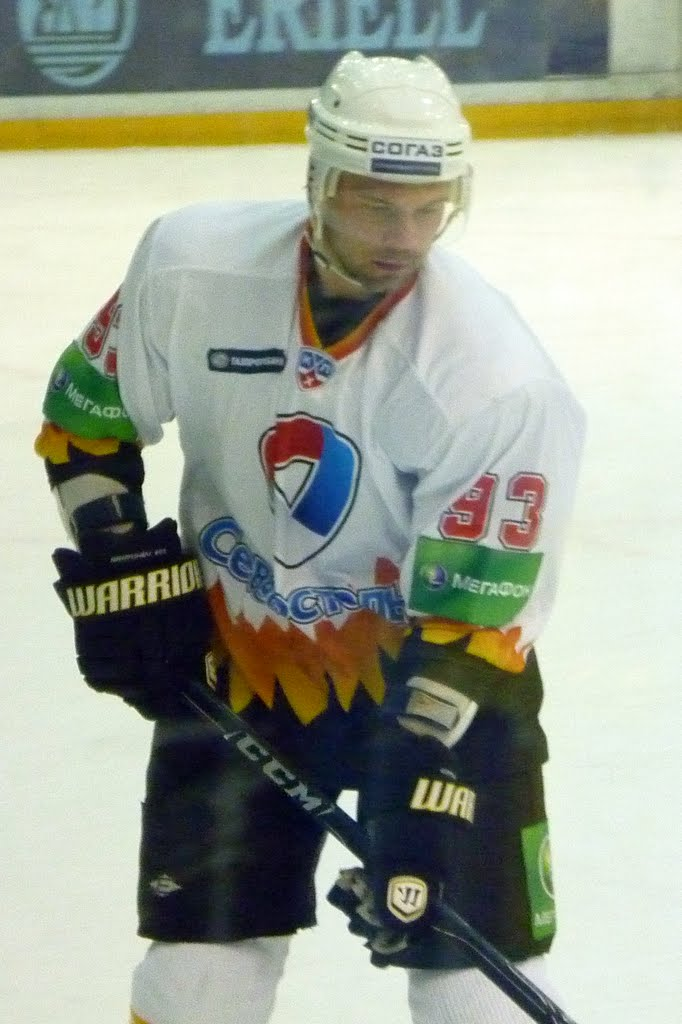
- Grachev with Severstal Cherepovets in 2010
- Born: 26 September 1988 (age 37) Novosibirsk, Russian SFSR, Soviet Union
- Height: 5 ft 11 in (180 cm)
- Weight: 203 lb (92 kg; 14 st 7 lb)
- Position: Left wing
- Shot: Left
- Played for: Bridgeport Sound Tigers; Binghamton Senators; Rochester Americans; HC Severstal Cherepovets; HC Sibir Novosibirsk
- NHL draft: 106th overall, 2007; New York Islanders
- Playing career: 2009–2013

Maxim Igorevich Gratchev (Russian: Максим Игоревич Грачёв; born 26 September 1988) is a Russian former professional ice hockey player who last played for HC Sibir Novosibirsk in the Kontinental Hockey League (KHL). He was selected by New York Islanders in the 4th round (106th overall) of the 2007 NHL entry draft. He played for HC Severstal of the KHL for one season, before singing with the Binghamton Senators before the 2011–12 season.

Gratchev confirmed the end of his playing career, in accepting a coaching role with HC Lada Togliatti of the then VHL on April 30, 2014.
