= 2010–11 QMJHL season =

- League: Quebec Major Junior Hockey League
- Sport: Hockey
- Duration: Regular season Sept. 9, 2010 – Mar. 20, 2011; Playoffs; Mar. 24, 2011 – May 15, 2011
- Teams: 18

Draft
- Top draft pick: Dillon Fournier
- Picked by: Lewiston Maineiacs

Regular season
- Jean Rougeau Trophy: Saint John Sea Dogs (2)
- Season MVP: Sean Couturier (Drummondville Voltigeurs)
- Top scorer: Philip-Michael Devos (Victoriaville / Gatineau)

Playoffs
- Playoffs MVP: Jonathan Huberdeau (Sea Dogs)
- Finals champions: Saint John Sea Dogs
- Runners-up: Gatineau Olympiques

QMJHL seasons
- 2009–10 2011–12

2010–11 CHL season
- League: Canadian Hockey League
- Sport: Hockey
- Duration: OHL; Sept. 23, 2010 – Mar. 20, 2011; QMJHL; Sept. 9, 2010 – Mar. 20, 2011; WHL; Sept. 24, 2010 – Mar. 20, 2011
- Teams: 60
- TV partner(s): FSN Northwest; RDS; Rogers Sportsnet; Rogers TV; Shaw TV
- Season MVP: Ryan Ellis (Windsor Spitfires) (OHL)
- Top scorer: Linden Vey (Medicine Hat Tigers) (WHL)

Memorial Cup
- Finals champions: Saint John Sea Dogs (QMJHL) (1st title)
- Runners-up: Mississauga St. Michael's Majors (OHL)

The 2010–11 QMJHL season was the 42nd season of the Quebec Major Junior Hockey League (QMJHL). The regular season, which consisted of eighteen teams playing 68 games each, began on September 9, 2010, and ended on March 20, 2011. The playoffs featured 16 teams chasing the President's Cup, beginning on March 24, 2011, and ending with the Saint John Sea Dogs capturing the title on May 15, 2011.

== Regular season ==
=== Division standings ===
Note: GP = Games played; W = Wins; L = Losses; OTL = Overtime losses; SL – Shootout losses; GF = Goals for; GA = Goals against; Pts = Points

Division Maritimes	GP	W	L	OTL	SL	GF	GA	Pts
Saint John Sea Dogs ^{z}	68	58	7	1	2	324	165	119
Acadie-Bathurst Titan ^{x}	68	44	21	2	1	261	197	91
Moncton Wildcats ^{x}	68	33	25	3	7	232	256	76
P.E.I. Rocket ^{x}	68	33	26	3	6	217	220	75
Halifax Mooseheads ^{x}	68	20	43	2	3	186	262	45
Cape Breton Screaming Eagles ^{x}	68	18	45	1	4	154	276	41

Division Telus West	GP	W	L	OTL	SL	GF	GA	Pts
Montreal Junior Hockey Club ^{z}	68	46	12	5	5	263	185	102
Drummondville Voltigeurs ^{x}	68	45	15	5	3	251	182	98
Gatineau Olympiques ^{x}	68	43	17	3	5	248	193	94
Shawinigan Cataractes ^{x}	68	42	23	2	1	250	202	87
Val-d'Or Foreurs ^{x}	68	25	34	5	4	208	263	59
Rouyn-Noranda Huskies	68	12	50	4	2	151	339	30

Division Telus East	GP	W	L	OTL	SL	GF	GA	Pts
Québec Remparts ^{z}	68	48	16	1	3	277	187	100
Lewiston MAINEiacs ^{x}	68	40	24	1	3	265	223	84
Victoriaville Tigres ^{x}	68	35	29	1	3	256	240	74
Rimouski Océanic ^{x}	68	31	33	1	3	226	236	66
Chicoutimi Saguenéens ^{x}	68	27	29	5	7	197	220	66
Baie-Comeau Drakkar	68	12	46	6	4	151	266	34

x – team has clinched playoff spot

y – team is division leader

z – team has clinched division

=== Scoring leaders ===
Note: GP = Games played; G = Goals; A = Assists; Pts = Points; PIM = Penalty minutes

Player	Team	GP	G	A	Pts	PIM
Philip-Michael Devos	Victoriaville / Gatineau	68	47	67	114	31
Gabriel Lévesque	Acadie-Bathurst Titan	68	37	70	107	29
Jonathan Huberdeau	Saint John Sea Dogs	67	43	62	105	88
Ondřej Palát	Drummondville Voltigeurs	61	39	57	96	24
Sean Couturier	Drummondville Voltigeurs	58	36	60	96	36
Jonathan Audy-Marchessault	Quebec Remparts	68	40	55	95	41
Zack Phillips	Saint John Sea Dogs	67	38	57	95	16
Alex Saulnier	Moncton Wildcats	65	25	60	85	8
Étienne Brodeur	Lewiston Maineiacs	68	53	30	83	71
Jonathan Hazen	Val-d'Or Foreurs	62	41	42	83	29

=== Leading goaltenders ===
Note: GP = Games played; TOI = Total ice time; W = Wins; L = Losses; GA = Goals against; SO = Total shutouts; SV% = Save percentage; GAA = Goals against average

Player	Team	GP	TOI	W	L	GA	SO	Sv%	GAA
Jacob DeSerres	Saint John Sea Dogs	30	1753:53	27	3	65	4	.916	2.22
Christopher Gibson	Chicoutimi Saguenéens	37	2233:54	14	15	90	4	.920	2.42
Maxime Clermont	Gatineau Olympiques	48	2659:22	28	10	113	4	.896	2.55
Jean-François Bérubé	Montreal Junior Hockey Club	50	2935:19	32	7	127	3	.902	2.60
Guillaume Nadeau	Drummondville Voltigeurs	47	2702:34	27	8	118	5	.897	2.62

== Playoffs ==
Round 1
1	Saint John	4
16	Cape Breton	0
6	Acadie-Bathurst	0
11	Victoriaville	4
2	Montréal	4
15	Halifax	0
8	Lewiston	4
9	Moncton	1
3	Québec	4
14	Val-d'Or	0
7	Shawinigan	4
10	P.E.I.	1
4	Drummondville	4
13	Chicoutimi	0
5	Gatineau	4
12	Rimouski	1

Quarter-finals
1	Saint John	4
11	Victoriaville	1
2	Montréal	2
8	Lewiston	4
3	Québec	4
7	Shawinigan	3
4	Drummondville	3
5	Gatineau	4

Semi-finals
1	Saint John	4
8	Lewiston	0
3	Québec	3
5	Gatineau	4

President Cup Championship
1	Saint John	4
5	Gatineau	2

== First round ==
=== (1) Saint John Sea Dogs vs. (16) Cape Breton Screaming Eagles ===
March 25	Saint John Sea Dogs	10 – 0	Cape Breton Screaming Eagles	Harbour Station	Recap
9:27 - Stanislav Galiev (1)		First period	No scoring
6:15 - pp - Zack Phillips (1); 6:48 - pp - Zack Phillips (2); 10:07 - Tomáš Jurčo (1); 14:22 - Ryan Tesink (1); 18:26 - pp - Zack Phillips (3); 19:18 - Stanislav Galiev (2); 19:47 - pp - Mike Thomas (1)		Second period	No scoring
14:31 - pp - Zack Phillips (4); 19:01 - Éric Gélinas (1)		Third period	No scoring
Jacob DeSerres (19 saves / 19 shots)		Goalie stats	Andrew Hayes (28 saves / 36 shots); Alexandre Véronneau (12 saves / 14 shots)

March 26	Saint John Sea Dogs	7 – 1	Cape Breton Screaming Eagles	Harbour Station	Recap
1:49 - pp - Jonathan Huberdeau (1)		First period	No scoring
1:40 - Stanislav Galiev (3); 9:46 - pp - Jonathan Huberdeau (2); 10:11 - Michael Kirkpatrick (1)		Second period	15:24 - Olivier Jodoin (1)
5:00 - Jonathan Huberdeau (3); 9:47 - Simon Després (1); 11:18 - Steven Anthony (1)		Third period	No scoring
Jacob DeSerres (15 saves / 16 shots)		Goalie stats	Andrew Hayes (33 saves / 40 shots)

March 29	Cape Breton Screaming Eagles	1 – 5	Saint John Sea Dogs	Centre 200	Recap
14:14 - Dany Potvin (1)		First period	Jonathan Huberdeau (4) - pp - 7:14; Steven Anthony (2) - 14:20; Kevin Gagné (1) - 19:12
No scoring		Second period	Stanislav Galiev (4) - 10:04
No scoring		Third period	Tomáš Jurčo (2) - pp - 0:53
Andrew Hayes (28 saves / 33 shots)		Goalie stats	Jacob DeSerres (21 saves / 22 shots)

March 30	Cape Breton Screaming Eagles	0 – 4	Saint John Sea Dogs	Centre 200	Recap
No scoring		First period	No scoring
No scoring		Second period	Stanislav Galiev (5) - 5:00; Jonathan Huberdeau (5) - sh - 9:44
No scoring		Third period	Michael Kirkpatrick (2) - sh - 6:07; Nathan Beaulieu (1) - 9:11
Andrew Hayes (32 saves / 36 shots)		Goalie stats	Mathieu Corbeil-Thériault (15 saves / 15 shots)

Saint John won series 4 – 0

=== (2) Montreal Junior Hockey Club vs. (15) Halifax Mooseheads ===
March 24	Montreal Junior Hockey Club	5 – 3	Halifax Mooseheads	Auditorium de Verdun	Recap
11:42 - Charles Landry (1); 16:49 - Nicolas Chouinard (1); 19:39 - Philippe Lefebvre (1)		First period	Matthew Boudreau (1) - 5:50
5:02 - Louis Leblanc (1)		Second period	No scoring
2:24 - Louis-Marc Aubry (1)		Third period	Konrad Abeltshauser (1) - pp - 17:03; Konrad Abeltshauser (2) - pp - 18:17
Jean-François Bérubé (15 saves / 18 shots)		Goalie stats	Frédéric Piché (25 saves / 30 shots); Anthony Terenzio (10 saves / 10 shots)

March 25	Montreal Junior Hockey Club	6 – 0	Halifax Mooseheads	Auditorium de Verdun	Recap
7:30 - David Rose (1)		First period	No scoring
14:31 – pp - Louis Leblanc (2)		Second period	No scoring
6:24 - sh – Nicolas Chouinard (2); 16:28 - pp - Jérémy Gouchie (1); 18:01 - pp - Louis Leblanc (3); 18:32 - pp - Raphaël Pouliot (1)		Third period	No scoring
Jean-François Bérubé (31 saves / 31 shots)		Goalie stats	Frédéric Piché (28 saves / 34 shots)

March 29	Halifax Mooseheads	0 – 2	Montreal Junior Hockey Club	Halifax Metro Centre	Recap
No scoring		First period	No scoring
No scoring		Second period	No scoring
No scoring		Third period	Trevor Parkes (1) - 18:52; Raphaël Pouliot (2) - en - 19:35
Frédéric Piché (28 saves / 29 shots)		Goalie stats	Jean-François Bérubé (29 saves / 29 shots)

March 30	Halifax Mooseheads	2 – 4	Montreal Junior Hockey Club	Halifax Metro Centre	Recap
18:36 - Konrad Abeltshauser (3)		First period	Trevor Parkes (2) - pp - 15:44
12:53 - Gabriel Desjardins (1)		Second period	Jérémy Gouchie (2) - 5:05; Louis Leblanc (4) - sh - 16:23
No scoring		Third period	Philippe Lefebvre (2) - 14:51
Frédéric Piché (37 saves / 41 shots)		Goalie stats	Jean-François Bérubé (34 saves / 36 shots)

Montreal won series 4 – 0

=== (3) Quebec Remparts vs. (14) Val-d'Or Foreurs ===
March 25	Quebec Remparts	7 – 2	Val-d'Or Foreurs	Colisée Pepsi	Recap
9:01 - Jonathan Audy-Marchessault (1); 17:49 - Frederick Roy (1); 19:19 - pp - Frederick Roy (2); 19:36 - Jonathan Audy-Marchessault (2)		First period	Alexandre Carrier (1) - 18:12
15:38 - Mikaël Tam (1)		Second period	Brett Hester (1) - 5:28
1:20 - pp - Jonathan Audy-Marchessault (3); 14:53 - pp - Vincent Barnard (1)		Third period	No scoring
Louis Domingue (16 saves / 18 shots)		Goalie stats	Jacob Gervais-Chouinard (17 saves / 23 shots); François Tremblay (19 saves / 20 shots)

March 26	Quebec Remparts	6 – 4	Val-d'Or Foreurs	Colisée Pepsi	Recap
5:42 - pp - Vincent Barnard (2)		First period	Brett Hester (2) - pp - 19:21
6:40 - pp - Alexandre Grenier (1); 16:31 - pp - Jonathan Audy-Marchessault (4)		Second period	Matthieu Thériault (1) - 3:59
10:10 - pp - Joël Champagne (1); 14:36 - pp - Tomáš Filippi (1); 19:13 - pp - Frederick Roy (3)		Third period	Marc-Alain Bégin (1) - 3:01; Connor Gagnon (1) - 16:00
Louis Domingue (19 saves / 23 shots)		Goalie stats	Jacob Gervais-Chouinard (27 saves / 33 shots)

March 29	Val-d'Or Foreurs	0 – 9	Quebec Remparts	Centre Air Creebec	Recap
No scoring		First period	Mirko Höfflin (1) - 0:16; Olivier Hinse (1) - 9:25; Alexandre Grenier (2) - 10:25; Joël Champagne (2) - 11:16; Frederick Roy (4) - pp - 12:16
No scoring		Second period	No scoring
No scoring		Third period	Alexandre Grenier (3) - 1:00; Alexandre Grenier (4) - pp - 2:35; Mathieu Lavallée (1) - pp - 17:07; Vincent Barnard (3) - 18:02
François Tremblay (14 saves / 19 shots); Jacob Gervais-Chouinard (14 saves / 18 shots)		Goalie stats	Louis Domingue (28 saves / 28 shots)

March 30	Val-d'Or Foreurs	2 – 5	Quebec Remparts	Centre Air Creebec	Recap
9:24 - Olivier Archambault (1)		First period	Joël Champagne (3) - 5:33; Ryan Bourque (1) - pp - 12:06
No scoring		Second period	Frederick Roy (5) - pp - 8:16
14:49 - Alexandre Carrier (2)		Third period	Tomáš Filippi (2) - 14:21; Jonathan Audy-Marchessault (5) - 16:18
François Tremblay (25 saves / 30 shots)		Goalie stats	Louis Domingue (31 saves / 33 shots)

Quebec won series 4 – 0

=== (4) Drummondville Voltigeurs vs. (13) Chicoutimi Saguenéens ===
March 25	Drummondville Voltigeurs	4 – 3	Chicoutimi Saguenéens	Centre Marcel Dionne	Recap
13:31 - Sean Couturier (1); 19:15 - Maxime Villemaire (1)		First period	No scoring
12:12 - Maxime Villemaire (2); 19:14 - Jean-Philippe Mathieu (1)		Second period	Andrew O'Brien (1) - 17:46; Steve Lebel (1) - 18:12
No scoring		Third period	Guillaume Asselin (1) - pp - 14:43
Guillaume Nadeau (25 saves / 28 shots)		Goalie stats	Christopher Gibson (34 saves / 38 shots)

March 26	Drummondville Voltigeurs	6 – 1	Chicoutimi Saguenéens	Centre Marcel Dionne	Recap
3:23 - Andrew Randazzo (1)		First period	Billy Lacasse (1) - 5:42
1:43 - Maxime Villemaire (3); 5:30 - Pier-Antoine Dion (1); 15:23 - Pier-Antoine Dion (2); 15:23 - pp - Ondřej Palát (1)		Second period	No scoring
17:58 - pp - Ondřej Palát (2)		Third period	No scoring
Guillaume Nadeau (17 saves / 18 shots)		Goalie stats	Christopher Gibson (26 saves / 31 shots); Francis Desrosiers (9 saves / 10 shots)

March 29	Chicoutimi Saguenéens	4 – 6	Drummondville Voltigeurs	Centre Georges-Vézina	Recap
1:12 - Nicolas Therrien (1); 8:36 - Billy Lacasse (2)		First period	Andrew Randazzo (2) - pp - 16:27; Jonathan Oligny (1) - 16:42
2:46 - Rock Régimbald (1)		Second period	André Bouvet-Morrissette (1) - 7:05; Mathieu Guertin (1) - 16:35
19:50 - Napessis André (1)		Third period	Sean Couturier (2) - 17:06; Sean Couturier (3) - en - 19:56
Christopher Gibson (31 saves / 36 shots)		Goalie stats	Guillaume Nadeau (1 save / 3 shots); Domenic Graham (19 saves / 21 shots)

March 30	Chicoutimi Saguenéens	4 – 5	Drummondville Voltigeurs	Centre Georges-Vézina	Recap
17:29 - pp - Alexandre Lavoie (1)		First period	No scoring
5:15 - pp - Nicolas Therrien (2); 17:23 - Steve Lebel (2)		Second period	Pier-Antoine Dion (3) - 0:41; Charles-David Beaudoin (1) - 6:12; Ondřej Palát (3) - 6:24
19:05 - Gabriel Vermette (1)		Third period	Ondřej Palát (4) - pp - 8:35; Marc-Olivier Vachon (1) - 17:03
Christopher Gibson (31 saves / 36 shots)		Goalie stats	Guillaume Nadeau (19 saves / 23 shots)

Drummondville won series 4 – 0

=== (5) Gatineau Olympiques vs. (12) Rimouski Océanic ===
March 25	Gatineau Olympiques	6 – 0	Rimouski Océanic	Centre Robert Guertin	Recap
9:30 - pp - Jean-Gabriel Pageau (1); 16:01 - pp - Mathieu Gagnon (1)		First period	No scoring
5:46 - pp - Tye McGinn (1); 12:26 - Igor Levitsky (1)		Second period	No scoring
9:03 - Christian Ouellet (1); 15:03 - pp - Olivier Picard (1)		Third period	No scoring
François Lacerte (25 saves / 25 shots)		Goalie stats	Morgan Clark (16 saves / 22 shots)

March 26	Gatineau Olympiques	3 – 2	OT	Rimouski Océanic	Centre Robert Guertin	Recap
No scoring		First period		No scoring
9:52 - pp - Jean-Gabriel Pageau (2)		Second period		No scoring
3:40 - Philippe Halley (1)		Third period		Gleason Fournier (1) - 4:01; Jarrad Struthers (1) - 16:20
2:05 - Tye McGinn (2)		First overtime period		No scoring
François Lacerte (23 saves / 25 shots)		Goalie stats		Morgan Clark (23 saves / 26 shots)

March 29	Rimouski Océanic	7 – 4	Gatineau Olympiques	Colisée de Rimouski	Recap
4:01 - pp - Félix Lefrançois (1); 8:44 - sh - Jarrad Struthers (2)		First period	Tye McGinn (3) - pp - 12:00
5:35 - pp - Jarrad Struthers (3); 19:33 - pp - Jérôme Gauthier-Leduc (1)		Second period	Mathieu Talbot (1) - 2:15; Nicolas Deslauriers (1) - pp - 15:41
4:10 - Patrick Delisle-Houde (1); 13:27 - pp - Alex Emond (1); 17:42 - en - Petr Straka (1)		Third period	Adam Jánošík (1) - pp - 0:59
Morgan Clark (24 saves / 28 shots)		Goalie stats	François Lacerte (4 saves / 6 shots); Maxime Clermont (22 saves / 26 shots)

March 30	Rimouski Océanic	3 – 4	OT	Gatineau Olympiques	Colisée de Rimouski	Recap
Félix Lefrançois (2) - 2:42		First period		No scoring
Jarrad Struthers (4) - pp - 14:00		Second period		16:10 - Hubert Labrie (1); 16:26 - Raphaël Lafontaine (1)
Petr Straka (2) - 16:05		Third period		9:20 - Philip-Michael Devos (1)
No scoring		First overtime period		5:41 - Jean-Gabriel Pageau (3)
Morgan Clark (35 saves / 39 shots)		Goalie stats		Maxime Clermont (32 saves / 35 shots)

April 1	Gatineau Olympiques	4 – 3	OT	Rimouski Océanic	Centre Robert Guertin	Recap
0:10 - Christian Ouellet (2)		First period		Alex Belzile (1) - 5:14
16:02 - Christian Ouellet (3)		Second period		No scoring
12:19 - Mitchell Porowski (1)		Third period		Jarrad Struthers (5) - pp - 4:34; Alex Belzile (2) - 5:57
5:43 - Philippe Halley (2)		First overtime period		No scoring
François Lacerte (23 saves / 26 shots)		Goalie stats		Morgan Clark (26 saves / 30 shots)

Gatineau won series 4 – 1

=== (6) Acadie-Bathurst Titan vs. (11) Victoriaville Tigres ===
March 25	Acadie-Bathurst Titan	4 – 7	Victoriaville Tigres	K.C. Irving Regional Centre	Recap
6:55 - pp - Gabriel Lévesque (1)		First period	No scoring
15:43 - pp - Garrett Clarke (1)		Second period	Yanni Gourde (1) - pp - 7:40; Yanni Gourde (2) - 14:19; Brandon Hynes (1) - 16:34; Yannick Dubé (1) - pp - 17:57
7:35 - pp - David Gilbert (1); 11:58 - pp - Jérémie Blain (1)		Third period	Philippe Maillet (1) - sh - 8:23; Phillip Danault (1) - 12:28; Guillaume Goulet (1) - en - 18:34
Olivier Roy (17 saves / 23 shots); Robert Steeves (4 saves / 4 shots)		Goalie stats	David Honzík (38 saves / 42 shots)

March 26	Acadie-Bathurst Titan	1 – 5	Victoriaville Tigres	K.C. Irving Regional Centre	Recap
No scoring		First period	Pier-Luc Pelletier (1) - 14:13
7:36 - Jérémie Blain (2)		Second period	Étienne St-Germain (1) - 13:47
No scoring		Third period	Brandon Hynes (2) - 1:20; Yannick Dubé (2) - 9:20; Philippe Maillet (2) - sh - en - 16:55
Olivier Roy (15 saves / 19 shots); Robert Steeves (4 saves / 4 shots)		Goalie stats	David Honzík (29 saves / 30 shots)

March 28	Victoriaville Tigres	6 – 3	Acadie-Bathurst Titan	Colisée Desjardins	Recap
0:25 - Guillaume Goulet (2); 2:50 - Troy Vance (1)		First period	No scoring
11:24 - Guillaume Goulet (3); 15:59 - pp - Étienne St-Germain (2)		Second period	Sébastien Trudeau (1) - 9:54
16:29 - Guillaume Naud (1); 18:26 - pp - Philippe Maillet (3)		Third period	David Gilbert (2) - pp - 18:04; Sébastien Trudeau (2) - pp - 19:55
David Honzík (41 saves / 44 shots)		Goalie stats	Olivier Roy (2 saves / 4 shots); Robert Steeves (34 saves / 38 shots)

March 30	Victoriaville Tigres	4 – 3	OT	Acadie-Bathurst Titan	Colisée Desjardins	Recap
12:34 - pp - Phillip Danault (2); 18:50 - Carl-Antoine Delisle (1)		First period		No scoring
No scoring		Second period		Sébastien Trudeau (3) - 3:42; Gabriel Lévesque (2) - pp - 9:05; Marc-Olivier Mimar (1) - 12:17
9:50 - Brandon Hynes (3)		Third period		No scoring
7:34 - Yannick Dubé (3)		First overtime period		No scoring
David Honzík (38 saves / 41 shots)		Goalie stats		Robert Steeves (39 saves / 43 shots)

Victoriaville won series 4 – 0

=== (7) Shawinigan Cataractes vs. (10) P.E.I. Rocket ===
March 25	Shawinigan Cataractes	2 – 1	OT	P.E.I. Rocket	Centre Bionest	Recap
15:03 - Anton Zlobin (1)		First period		No scoring
No scoring		Second period		No scoring
No scoring		Third period		Travis McIsaac (1) - 13:48
5:10 – pp – Michaël Bournival (1)		First overtime period		No scoring
Gabriel Girard (32 saves / 33 shots)		Goalie stats		Evan Mosher (31 saves / 33 shots)

March 26	Shawinigan Cataractes	2 – 4	P.E.I. Rocket	Centre Bionest	Recap
No scoring		First period	Samuel Morneau (1) - 17:25
10:56 - pp - Benjamin Casavant (1)		Second period	Andrej Nestrašil (1) - 15:42
12:43 – Anton Zlobin (2)		Third period	Olivier Croteau (1) - 11:07; Ben Duffy (1) - 17:16
Gabriel Girard (19 saves / 23 shots)		Goalie stats	Evan Mosher (33 saves / 35 shots)

March 29	P.E.I. Rocket	0 – 3	Shawinigan Cataractes	Charlottetown Civic Centre	Recap
No scoring		First period	Anton Zlobin (3) - 5:43
No scoring		Second period	Ryan Kavanagh (1) - pp - 18:12
No scoring		Third period	Yannick Veilleux (1) - 4:23
Evan Mosher (30 saves / 33 shots)		Goalie stats	Gabriel Girard (28 saves / 28 shots)

March 30	P.E.I. Rocket	2 – 4	Shawinigan Cataractes	Charlottetown Civic Centre	Recap
No scoring		First period	Dave Labrecque (1) - 12:06; Peter Sakaris (1) - pp - 16:42
12:52 - pp - Ben Duffy (2)		Second period	Michaël Bournival (2) - pp - 19:56
6:38 - Philippe Paradis (1)		Third period	Maximilien Le Sieur (1) - sh - 6:38
Evan Mosher (26 saves / 30 shots)		Goalie stats	Gabriel Girard (33 saves / 35 shots)

April 1	P.E.I. Rocket	1 – 4	Shawinigan Cataractes	Charlottetown Civic Centre	Recap
No scoring		First period	No scoring
Samuel Morneau (2) - 15:41		Second period	No scoring
No scoring		Third period	7:41 - Maximilien Le Sieur (2); 11:42 - Jean-François Plante (1); 13:25 - Michaël Bournival (3); 16:06 - Dave Labrecque (2)
Evan Mosher (30 saves / 34 shots)		Goalie stats	Gabriel Girard (36 saves / 37 shots)

Shawinigan won series 4 – 1

=== (8) Lewiston Maineiacs vs. (9) Moncton Wildcats ===
March 25	Lewiston Maineiacs	1 – 4	Moncton Wildcats	Androscoggin Bank Colisée	Recap
10:34 - Jess Tanguy (1)		First period	Simon Jodoin (1) - pp - 12:25
No scoring		Second period	Daniel Milan (1) - 12:17
No scoring		Third period	Ryan Penny (1) - 3:49; Allain Saulnier (1) - en - 19:19
Nicholas Champion (22 saves / 25 shots)		Goalie stats	Brandon Thibeau (24 saves / 25 shots)

March 26	Lewiston Maineiacs	2 – 1	Moncton Wildcats	Androscoggin Bank Colisée	Recap
5:59 - Michael Chaput (1)		First period	No scoring
1:26 - Olivier Dame-Malka (1)		Second period	Allain Saulnier (2) - 18:37
No scoring		Third period	No scoring
Nicholas Champion (17 saves / 18 shots)		Goalie stats	Brandon Thibeau (25 saves / 27 shots)

March 29	Moncton Wildcats	2 – 4	Lewiston Maineiacs	Moncton Coliseum	Recap
6:47 - Daniel Pettersson (1)		First period	Samuel Carrier (1) - pp - 12:10
17:24 - sh - Daniel Pettersson (2)		Second period	Cameron Critchlow (1) - 2:30; Alex Zafiris (1) - pp - 17:54
No scoring		Third period	Michael Chaput (2) - 17:11
Brandon Thibeau (34 saves / 38 shots)		Goalie stats	Nicolas Champion (24 saves / 26 shots)

March 30	Lewiston Maineiacs	3 – 4	OT	Moncton Wildcats	Androscoggin Bank Colisée	Recap
Pierre-Olivier Morin (1) - 3:38; Kirill Kabanov (1) - pp - 16:38		First period		No scoring
No scoring		Second period		6:20 - pp - Allain Saulnier (3)
Étienne Brodeur (1) - 10:58		Third period		4:42 - Devon MacAusland (1); 16:13 - pp - Alex Saulnier (1)
Étienne Brodeur (2) - 8:49		First overtime period		No scoring
Nicolas Champion (39 saves / 42 shots)		Goalie stats		Brandon Thibeau (30 saves / 34 shots)

April 1	Lewiston Maineiacs	6 – 1	Moncton Wildcats	Androscoggin Bank Colisée	Recap
11:06 - Alex Zafiris (2)		First period	Devon MacAusland (2) - 19:02
8:04 - pp - Michael Chaput (3); 12:16 - Kirill Kabanov (2)		Second period	No scoring
4:10 - Matthew Bissonnette (1); 7:55 - Stefan Fournier (1); 17:07 - pp - Bryce Milson (1)		Third period	No scoring
Nicolas Champion (30 saves / 31 shots)		Goalie stats	Brandon Thibeau (25 saves / 31 shots)

Lewiston won series 4 – 1

== Quarter-finals ==
=== (1) Saint John Sea Dogs vs. (11) Victoriaville Tigres ===
April 8	Saint John Sea Dogs	4 – 1	Victoriaville Tigres	Harbour Station	Recap
Tomáš Jurčo (3) - 5:09		First period	No scoring
Jonathan Huberdeau (6) - 17:16		Second period	13:55 - pp - Yanni Gourde (3)
Stanislav Galiev (6) - 7:18; Steven Anthony (3) - sh - en - 19:36		Third period	No scoring
Jacob DeSerres (29 saves / 30 shots)		Goalie stats	David Honzík (39 saves / 42 shots)

April 9	Saint John Sea Dogs	2 – 3	Victoriaville Tigres	Harbour Station	Recap
No scoring		First period	17:34 - pp - Brandon Hynes (4); 19:30 - Phillip Danault (3)
Jonathan Huberdeau (7) - pp - 13:08		Second period	No scoring
Steven Anthony (4) - pp - 3:01		Third period	17:00 - pp - Phillip Danault (4)
Jacob DeSerres (25 saves / 28 shots)		Goalie stats	David Honzík (41 saves / 43 shots)

April 12	Victoriaville Tigres	3 – 6	Saint John Sea Dogs	Colisée Desjardins	Recap
No scoring		First period	8:59 - pp - Éric Gélinas (2); 11:10 - Stephen MacAulay (1)
Samuel Groulx (1) - 16:50		Second period	No scoring
Pier-Luc Pelletier (2) - 15:21; Yanni Gourde (4) - 18:14		Third period	1:55 - Jonathan Huberdeau (8); 9:14 - Zack Phillips (5); 16:15 - Danick Gauthier (1); 17:52 - Jonathan Huberdeau (9)
David Honzík (33 saves / 39 shots)		Goalie stats	Jacob DeSerres (25 saves / 28 shots)

April 13	Victoriaville Tigres	4 – 5	OT	Saint John Sea Dogs	Colisée Desjardins	Recap
2:21 - Phillip Danault (5); 10:05 - Benjamin Laliberté (1)		First period		Jason Cameron (1) - 3:32; Éric Gélinas (3) - 6:43
No scoring		Second period		No scoring
6:46 - Philippe Maillet (4); 19:25 - Brandon Hynes (5)		Third period		Stephen MacAulay (2) - 5:10; Tomáš Jurčo (4) - 14:26
No scoring		First overtime period		Jonathan Huberdeau (10) - 3:04
David Honzík (39 saves / 44 shots)		Goalie stats		Jacob DeSerres (24 saves / 28 shots)

April 15	Victoriaville Tigres	2 – 3	Saint John Sea Dogs	Colisée Desjardins	Recap
1:21 - Brandon Hynes (6); 6:32 - Carl-Antoine Delisle (2)		First period	No scoring
No scoring		Second period	Zack Phillips (6) - 1:13; Stanislav Galiev (7) - 5:38
No scoring		Third period	Zack Phillips (7) - 12:54
David Honzík (42 saves / 45 shots)		Goalie stats	Jacob DeSerres (22 saves / 24 shots)

Saint John won series 4 – 1

=== (2) Montreal Junior Hockey Club vs. (8) Lewiston Maineiacs ===
April 8	Montreal Junior Hockey Club	6 – 5	OT	Lewiston Maineiacs	Auditorium de Verdun	Recap
7:36 - Trevor Parkes (3); 9:53 - pp - Trevor Parkes (4)		First period		Matthew Bissonnette (2) - pp - 12:39; Matthew Bissonnette (3) - 14:06
No scoring		Second period		Olivier Dame-Malka (2) - pp - 12:17; Matthew Bissonnette (4) - 16:57
1:12 - Louis Leblanc (5); 17:57 - Philippe Lefebvre (3); 18:38 - Louis-Marc Aubry (2)		Third period		Michael Chaput (4) - 19:30
4:52 - David Rose (2)		First overtime period		No scoring
Jean-François Bérubé (31 saves / 36 shots)		Goalie stats		Nicolas Champion (42 saves / 48 shots)

April 9	Montreal Junior Hockey Club	2 – 6	Lewiston Maineiacs	Auditorium de Verdun	Recap
Charles-Olivier Roussel (1) - pp - 3:57		First period	13:05 - pp - Olivier Dame-Malka (3)
Jérémy Gouchie (3) - 9:09		Second period	19:41 - pp - Olivier Dame-Malka (4)
No scoring		Third period	12:23 - Olivier Dame-Malka (5); 14:12 - pp - Olivier Dame-Malka (6); 17:40 - en - Antoine Houde-Caron (1); 19:50 - pp - Pierre-Olivier Morin (2)
Jean-François Bérubé (28 saves / 33 shots)		Goalie stats	Nicolas Champion (32 saves / 34 shots)

April 12	Lewiston Maineiacs	2 – 1	Montreal Junior Hockey Club	Androscoggin Bank Colisée	Recap
No scoring		First period	No scoring
16:47 - Samuel Carrier (2)		Second period	Trevor Parkes (5) - 16:02
19:55 - Étienne Brodeur (3)		Third period	No scoring
Nicolas Champion (28 saves / 29 shots)		Goalie stats	Jean-François Bérubé (17 saves / 19 shots)

April 13	Lewiston Maineiacs	4 – 1	Montreal Junior Hockey Club	Androscoggin Bank Colisée	Recap
Michael Chaput (5) - pp - 12:52		First period	No scoring
No scoring		Second period	11:39 - pp - David Rose (3)
Kirill Kabanov (3) - pp - 0:33; Kirill Kabanov (4) - 4:33; Antoine Houde-Caron (2) - en - 18:32		Third period	No scoring
Nicolas Champion (31 saves / 32 shots)		Goalie stats	Jean-François Bérubé (27 saves / 30 shots)

April 15	Montreal Junior Hockey Club	5 – 4	2OT	Lewiston Maineiacs	Auditorium de Verdun	Recap
Trevor Parkes (6) - 10:24		First period		8:54 - pp - Kirill Kabanov (5); 13:07 - pp - Olivier Dame-Malka (7)
Louis-Marc Aubry (3) - pp - 1:36; Louis-Marc Aubry (4) - 12:47		Second period		No scoring
Louis-Marc Aubry (5) - 14:19		Third period		9:24 - Michael Chaput (6); 18:45 - Olivier Dame-Malka (8)
Dylan Anderson (1) - 1:37		Second overtime period		No scoring
Jean-François Bérubé (23 saves / 27 shots)		Goalie stats		Nicolas Champion (31 saves / 36 shots)

April 17	Lewiston Maineiacs	6 – 3	Montreal Junior Hockey Club	Androscoggin Bank Colisée	Recap
2:34 - Jess Tanguy (2); 7:32 - Pierre-Olivier Morin (3)		First period	Louis Leblanc (6) - 7:07
17:54 - Stefan Fournier (2)		Second period	Nicolas Chouinard (3) - 11:03
7:41 - Pierre-Olivier Morin (4); 15:58 - pp - Stefan Fournier (3); 19:45 - en - Michael Chaput (7)		Third period	Nicolas Chouinard (4) - sh - 17:47
Nicolas Champion (36 saves / 39 shots)		Goalie stats	Jean-François Bérubé (32 saves / 37 shots)

Lewiston won series 4 – 2

=== (3) Quebec Remparts vs. (7) Shawinigan Cataractes ===
April 8	Quebec Remparts	8 – 1	Shawinigan Cataractes	Colisée Pepsi	Recap
Joël Champagne (4) - pp - 6:18; Axel Rioux (1) - 11:59; Alexandre Grenier (5) - 17:51		First period	No scoring
Joël Champagne (5) - 3:00; Alexandre Grenier (6) - 15:19; Ryan Bourque (2) - pp - 19:59		Second period	No scoring
Olivier Hinse (2) - sh - 2:14; Frederick Roy (6) - pp - 12:36		Third period	4:27 - Dave Labrecque (3)
Louis Domingue (26 saves / 27 shots)		Goalie stats	Gabriel Girard (12 saves / 17 shots); Alex Dubeau (9 saves / 12 shots)

April 9	Quebec Remparts	5 – 1	Shawinigan Cataractes	Colisée Pepsi	Recap
Ryan Bourque (3) - 12:32; Alex Wall (1) - sh - 16:00		First period	16:56 - pp - Dave Labrecque (4)
Vincent Barnard (4) - 13:36		Second period	No scoring
Jonathan Audy-Marchessault (6) - pp - 4:36; Joé Dubé (1) - 12:57		Third period	No scoring
Louis Domingue (38 saves / 39 shots)		Goalie stats	Gabriel Girard (27 saves / 32 shots)

April 12	Shawinigan Cataractes	6 – 3	Quebec Remparts	Centre Bionest	Recap
Michaël Bournival (4) - 7:49		First period	6:32 - Olivier Hinse (3); 11:55 - pp - Jonathan Audy-Marchessault (7); 14:02 - Tomáš Filippi (3)
No scoring		Second period	No scoring
Maximilien Le Sieur (3) - 0:34; Dave Labrecque (5) - 4:28; Mathieu Gagnon (1) - 10:29; Loïk Poudrier (1) - 12:44; Peter Sakaris (2) - 14:27		Third period	No scoring
Gabriel Girard (6 saves / 9 shots); Alex Dubeau (19 saves / 19 shots)		Goalie stats	Louis Domingue (25 saves / 30 shots); Jimmy Appleby (1 save / 2 shots)

April 13	Shawinigan Cataractes	1 – 5	Quebec Remparts	Centre Bionest	Recap
9:35 - Anton Zlobin (4)		First period	Jonathan Audy-Marchessault (8) - 6:08
No scoring		Second period	No scoring
No scoring		Third period	Jonathan Audy-Marchessault (9) - 10:38; Frederick Roy (7) - 11:59; Mirko Höfflin (2) - 14:04; Alexandre Grenier (7) - en - 14:40
Gabriel Girard (33 saves / 37 shots)		Goalie stats	Louis Domingue (23 saves / 24 shots); Jimmy Appleby (0 saves / 0 shots)

April 15	Quebec Remparts	3 – 4	OT	Shawinigan Cataractes	Colisée Pepsi	Recap
No scoring		First period		12:21 - Peter Sakaris (3); 19:41 - pp - Anton Zlobin (5)
Ryan Bourque (4) - 4:01; Alex Wall (2) - pp - 10:25; Joé Dubé (2) - 11:50		Second period		11:01 - Jean-François Plante (2)
No scoring		Third period		No scoring
No scoring		First overtime period		12:43 - Peter Sakaris (4)
Louis Domingue (32 saves / 36 shots)		Goalie stats		Gabriel Girard (42 saves / 45 shots)

April 17	Shawinigan Cataractes	4 – 2	Quebec Remparts	Centre Bionest	Recap
Benjamin Casavant - 17:23 (2)		First period	No scoring
Yannick Veilleux (2) - 13:33		Second period	No scoring
Michaël Bournival (5) - 4:50; Ryan Kavanagh (2) - 8:57		Third period	13:16 - Matthew Brown; 15:49 - pp - Joël Champagne (6)
Gabriel Girard (31 saves / 33 shots)		Goalie stats	Louis Domingue (28 saves / 32 shots)

April 19	Quebec Remparts	9 – 2	Shawinigan Cataractes	Colisée Pepsi	Recap
15:27 - Frederick Roy (8)		First period	No scoring
0:16 - pp - Mirko Höfflin (3); 1:36 - Jonathan Audy-Marchessault (10); 5:44 - Mikaël Tam (2); 17:52 - pp - Mikaël Tam (3)		Second period	No scoring
6:50 - Matthew Brown (2); 12:04 - pp - Vincent Barnard (5); 12:53 - pp - Joël Champagne (7); 17:44 - Vincent Barnard (6)		Third period	Ryan Kavanagh (3) - 0:32; Dave Labrecque (6) - pp - 14:56
Louis Domingue (27 saves / 29 shots)		Goalie stats	Gabriel Girard (19 saves / 24 shots); Alex Dubeau (12 saves / 16 shots)

Quebec won series 4 – 3

=== (4) Drummondville Voltigeurs vs. (5) Gatineau Olympiques ===
April 8	Drummondville Voltigeurs	3 – 1	Gatineau Olympiques	Centre Marcel Dionne	Recap
No scoring		First period	No scoring
Rémi Blanchard (1) - 13:39		Second period	No scoring
André Bouvet-Morrissette (2) - pp - 5:25; Jonathan Brunelle (1) - 18:46		Third period	6:35 - Nicolas Deslauriers (2)
Guillaume Nadeau (30 saves / 31 shots)		Goalie stats	Maxime Clermont (29 saves / 32 shots); François Lacerte (0 saves / 0 shots)

April 9	Drummondville Voltigeurs	3 – 0	Gatineau Olympiques	Centre Marcel Dionne	Recap
Jérôme Raymond (1) - 10:17; Sean Couturier (4) - 18:14		First period	No scoring
No scoring		Second period	No scoring
Jérôme Raymond (2) - en - 18:27		Third period	No scoring
Guillaume Nadeau (27 saves / 27 shots)		Goalie stats	Maxime Clermont (25 saves / 27 shots)

April 12	Gatineau Olympiques	4 – 1	Drummondville Voltigeurs	Centre Robert Guertin	Recap
Philippe Halley (3) - 1:06; Philippe Halley (4) - 9:10		First period	9:36 - Sean Couturier (5)
No scoring		Second period	No scoring
Hubert Labrie (2) - 16:25; Philip-Michael Devos (2) - en - 19:26		Third period	No scoring
Maxime Clermont (20 saves / 21 shots)		Goalie stats	Guillaume Nadeau (24 saves / 27 shots)

April 13	Gatineau Olympiques	6 – 1	Drummondville Voltigeurs	Centre Robert Guertin	Recap
Jean-Gabriel Pageau (4) - 17:43		First period	No scoring
Tommy Tremblay (1) - 2:49; Philippe Halley (5) - 6:28; Jean-Gabriel Pageau (5) - 17:59		Second period	No scoring
Philip-Michael Devos (3) - 0:22; Mitchell Porowski (2) - pp - 2:26		Third period	8:08 - Andrew Randazzo (3)
Maxime Clermont (19 saves / 20 shots)		Goalie stats	Guillaume Nadeau (16 saves / 20 shots); Domenic Graham (11 saves / 13 shots)

April 15	Drummondville Voltigeurs	1 – 5	Gatineau Olympiques	Centre Marcel Dionne	Recap
No scoring		First period	Philippe Halley (6) - 18:44
No scoring		Second period	Jean-Gabriel Pageau (6) - pp - 0:55; Christian Ouellet (4) - 1:29; Tye McGinn (4) - 4:01
7:12 - pp - Sean Couturier (6)		Third period	Tommy Tremblay (2) - 15:22
Guillaume Nadeau (9 saves / 13 shots); Domenic Graham (15 saves / 16 shots)		Goalie stats	Maxime Clermont (29 saves / 30 shots)

April 17	Gatineau Olympiques	6 – 3	Drummondville Voltigeurs	Centre Robert Guertin	Recap
5:28 - Raphaël Lafontaine (2)		First period	Maxime Villemaire (4) - 7:39
No scoring		Second period	Jérôme Raymond (3) - 4:40
1:56 - pp - Christian Ouellet (5); 3:41 - Adam Jánošík (2); 6:05 - Jean-Gabriel Pageau (7); 17:07 - Jean-Gabriel Pageau (8); 17:49 - en - Cody Linteau (1)		Third period	Rémi Blanchard (2) - 5:03
Maxime Clermont (28 saves / 31 shots)		Goalie stats	Domenic Graham (14 saves / 18 shots); Guillaume Nadeau (1 save / 2 shots)

Gatineau won series 4 – 2

== Semi-finals ==
=== (1) Saint John Sea Dogs vs. (8) Lewiston Maineiacs ===
April 22	Saint John Sea Dogs	5 – 4	OT	Lewiston Maineiacs	Harbour Station	Recap
10:16 - Pierre Durepos (1); 13:40 - pp - Steven Anthony (5)		First period		Matthew Bissonnette (5) - 19:18
No scoring		Second period		Jess Tanguy (3) - 1:33; Kirill Kabanov (6) - pp - 6:15
14:28 - Nathan Beaulieu (2); 15:42 - Tomáš Jurčo		Third period		Antoine Houde-Caron (3) - sh - 6:02
2:59 - Stephen MacAulay (3)		First overtime period		No scoring
Jacob DeSerres (20 saves / 24 shots); Mathieu Corbeil-Thériault (6 saves / 6 shots)		Goalie stats		Nicolas Champion (26 saves / 31 shots)

April 23	Saint John Sea Dogs	4 – 1	Lewiston Maineiacs	Harbour Station	Recap
2:16 - Michael Kirkpatrick (3)		First period	No scoring
9:50 - pp - Stanislav Galiev (8); 10:08 - pp - Kevin Gagné (2); 12:20 - pp - Jonathan Huberdeau (11)		Second period	No scoring
No scoring		Third period	Kirill Kabanov (7) - 9:54
Mathieu Corbeil-Thériault (24 saves / 25 shots)		Goalie stats	Nicolas Champion (29 saves / 33 shots); Andrey Makarov (13 saves / 13 shots)

April 26	Lewiston Maineiacs	2 – 5	Saint John Sea Dogs	Androscoggin Bank Colisée	Recap
No scoring		First period	No scoring
11:23 - Kirill Kabanov (8)		Second period	Jonathan Huberdeau (12) - pp - 1:56; Tomáš Jurčo (6) - 3:14; Ryan Tesink (2) - 7:01; Mike Thomas (2) - 18:26
18:15 - en - Stanislav Galiev (9)		Third period	Christophe Lalonde (1) - 0:23
Nicolas Champion (18 saves / 22 shots); Andrey Makarov (7 saves / 7 shots)		Goalie stats	Mathieu Corbeil-Thériault (28 saves / 30 shots)

April 27	Lewiston Maineiacs	5 – 6	Saint John Sea Dogs	Androscoggin Bank Colisée	Recap
Cameron Critchlow (2) - 1:21; Alex Zafiris (3) - 2:43; Olivier Dame-Malka (9) - 5:05		First period	7:07 - Zack Phillips (8)
Stefan Fournier (4) - 3:44		Second period	1:28 - pp - Nathan Beaulieu (3); 5:22 - Scott Oke (1); 13:29 - Jonathan Huberdeau (13)
Pierre-Olivier Morin (5) - 5:47		Third period	4:35 - pp - Éric Gélinas (4); 17:08 - Stephen MacAulay (4)
Andrey Makarov (31 saves / 37 shots)		Goalie stats	Mathieu Corbeil-Thériault (0 saves / 2 shots); Jacob DeSerres (25 saves / 28 shots)

Saint John won series 4 – 0

=== (3) Quebec Remparts vs. (5) Gatineau Olympiques ===
April 22	Quebec Remparts	1 – 2	Gatineau Olympiques	Colisée Pepsi	Recap
3:13 - Martin Lefebvre (1)		First period	No scoring
No scoring		Second period	Adam Jánošík (3) - pp - 6:12
No scoring		Third period	Jacob Conrad (1) - 4:13
Louis Domingue (24 saves / 26 shots)		Goalie stats	Maxime Clermont (28 saves / 29 shots)

April 23	Quebec Remparts	3 – 2	Gatineau Olympiques	Colisée Pepsi	Recap
3:09 - Joël Champagne (8)		First period	Nicolas Deslauriers (3) - pp - 18:24
No scoring		Second period	Igor Levitsky (2) - 2:23
15:21 - Jonathan Audy-Marchessault (11); 18:32 - Ryan Bourque (5)		Third period	No scoring
Louis Domingue (27 saves / 29 shots)		Goalie stats	Maxime Clermont (19 saves / 22 shots)

April 26	Gatineau Olympiques	1 – 2	Quebec Remparts	Centre Robert Guertin	Recap
11:12 - pp - Philippe Halley (7)		First period	No scoring
No scoring		Second period	No scoring
No scoring		Third period	Tomáš Filippi (4) - 1:19; Alexandre Grenier (8) - 15:19
Maxime Clermont (27 saves / 29 shots)		Goalie stats	Louis Domingue (27 saves / 28 shots)

April 27	Gatineau Olympiques	1 – 2	Quebec Remparts	Centre Robert Guertin	Recap
No scoring		First period	No scoring
12:36 - sh - Jean-Gabriel Pageau (9)		Second period	Joël Champagne (9) - pp - 14:07
No scoring		Third period	Joël Champagne (10) - 12:17
Maxime Clermont (27 saves / 29 shots)		Goalie stats	Louis Domingue (29 saves / 30 shots)

April 29	Quebec Remparts	3 – 5	Gatineau Olympiques	Colisée Pepsi	Recap
13:28 - pp - Vincent Barnard (7)		First period	Christian Ouellet (6) - pp - 12:12; Jean-Gabriel Pageau (10) - 15:13
7:45 - Tomáš Filippi (5)		Second period	Jean-Gabriel Pageau (11) - 17:43
19:10 - pp - Olivier Hinse (4)		Third period	Philip-Michael Devos (4) - 16:49; Jean-Gabriel Pageau (12) - en - 17:54
Louis Domingue (20 saves / 24 shots)		Goalie stats	Maxime Clermont (24 saves / 27 shots)

May 1	Gatineau Olympiques	4 – 0	Quebec Remparts	Centre Robert Guertin	Recap
Philip-Michael Devos (5) - pp - 6:25; Christian Ouellet (7) - 17:30		First period	No scoring
Nicolas Deslauriers (4) - 2:31; Christian Ouellet (8) - pp - 4:27		Second period	No scoring
No scoring		Third period	No scoring
Maxime Clermont (21 saves / 21 shots)		Goalie stats	Louis Domingue (9 saves / 12 shots); Jimmy Appleby (15 saves / 16 shots)

May 3	Quebec Remparts	2 – 5	Gatineau Olympiques	Colisée Pepsi	Recap
No scoring		First period	1:08 - Christian Ouellet (9); 15:00 - pp - Philip-Michael Devos (6)
Mirko Höfflin (4) - 8:52; Joël Champagne (11) - pp - 14:05		Second period	No scoring
No scoring		Third period	5:25 - Christian Ouellet (10); 6:20 - Mitchell Porowski (3); 19:57 - en - Philip-Michael Devos
Louis Domingue (2 saves / 4 shots); Jimmy Appleby (20 saves / 22 shots)		Goalie stats	Maxime Clermont (31 saves / 33 shots)

Gatineau won series 4 – 3

== QMJHL Championship ==
=== (1) Saint John Sea Dogs vs. (5) Gatineau Olympiques ===
May 5	Saint John Sea Dogs	2 – 1	Gatineau Olympiques	Harbour Station	Recap
12:35 - Danick Gauthier (2)		First period	No scoring
No scoring		Second period	Hubert Labrie (3) - 7:38
12:17 - Simon Després (2)		Third period	No scoring
Jacob DeSerres (22 saves / 23 shots)		Goalie stats	Maxime Clermont (35 saves / 37 shots)

May 7	Saint John Sea Dogs	2 – 3	Gatineau Olympiques	Harbour Station	Recap
Simon Després (3) - pp - 12:50		First period	4:26 - Hubert Labrie (4); 9:42 - Tommy Tremblay (3)
No scoring		Second period	No scoring
Simon Després (4) - 18:51		Third period	5:01 - Nicolas Deslauriers (5)
Jacob DeSerres (21 saves / 24 shots)		Goalie stats	Maxime Clermont (38 saves / 40 shots)

May 9	Gatineau Olympiques	0 – 5	Saint John Sea Dogs	Centre Robert Guertin	Recap
No scoring		First period	Stephen MacAulay (5) - 19:59
No scoring		Second period	Jonathan Huberdeau (14) - 1:49; Aidan Kelly (1) - 9:40
No scoring		Third period	Danick Gauthier (3) - 12:34; Mike Thomas (3) - 16:11
Maxime Clermont (30 saves / 35 shots)		Goalie stats	Jacob DeSerres (17 saves / 17 shots)

May 11	Gatineau Olympiques	3 – 4	2OT	Saint John Sea Dogs	Centre Robert Guertin	Recap
Philip-Michael Devos (8) - 6:29		First period		16:44 - Jonathan Huberdeau (15); 17:01 - Zack Phillips (9)
No scoring		Second period		No scoring
Tye McGinn (5) - pp - 1:08; Philip-Michael Devos (9) - 1:58		Third period		6:10 - pp - Nathan Beaulieu (4)
No scoring		Second overtime period		19:16 - pp - Ryan Tesink (3)
Maxime Clermont (60 saves / 64 shots)		Goalie stats		Jacob DeSerres (35 saves / 38 shots)

May 13	Saint John Sea Dogs	2 – 3	Gatineau Olympiques	Harbour Station	Recap
No scoring		First period	No scoring
14:37 - Éric Gélinas (5); 16:38 - Stephen MacAulay (6)		Second period	Christian Ouellet (11) - pp - 3:19; Adam Jánošík (4) - 11:53
No scoring		Third period	Jean-Gabriel Pageau (13) - 10:00
Jacob DeSerres (20 saves / 23 shots)		Goalie stats	Maxime Clermont (25 saves / 27 shots)

May 15	Gatineau Olympiques	2 – 3	2OT	Saint John Sea Dogs	Centre Robert Guertin	Recap
11:12 - Philip-Michael Devos (10)		First period		Stanislav Galiev (10) - 4:10
No scoring		Second period		No scoring
14:48 - Adam Jánošík (5)		Third period		Jonathan Huberdeau (16) - 19:37
No scoring		Second overtime period		Alexandre Beauregard (1) - 15:45
Maxime Clermont (52 saves / 55 shots)		Goalie stats		Jacob DeSerres (34 saves / 36 shots); Mathieu Corbeil-Thériault (0 saves / 0 shots)

Saint John won series 4 – 2

== Playoff scoring leaders ==
Note: GP = Games played; G = Goals; A = Assists; Pts = Points; PIM = Penalty minutes

Player	Team	GP	G	A	Pts	PIM
Jonathan Audy-Marchessault	Quebec Remparts	18	11	22	33	12
Jonathan Huberdeau	Saint John Sea Dogs	19	16	14	30	16
Jean-Gabriel Pageau	Gatineau Olympiques	24	13	16	29	20
Philip-Michael Devos	Gatineau Olympiques	24	10	19	29	8
Stanislav Galiev	Saint John Sea Dogs	19	10	17	27	12
Zack Phillips	Saint John Sea Dogs	17	9	15	24	8
Joël Champagne	Quebec Remparts	18	11	9	20	16
Kirill Kabanov	Lewiston Maineiacs	15	8	12	20	18
Michael Chaput	Lewiston Maineiacs	13	7	13	20	11
Nicolas Deslauriers	Gatineau Olympiques	24	5	15	20	19

== Playoff leading goaltenders ==
Note: GP = Games played; Mins = Minutes played; W = Wins; L = Losses; GA = Goals Allowed; SO = Shutouts; SV& = Save percentage; GAA = Goals against average

Player	Team	GP	Mins	W	L	GA	SO	Sv%	GAA
Jacob DeSerres	Saint John Sea Dogs	16	1021	12	3	34	2	0.916	2.00
Maxime Clermont	Gatineau Olympiques	21	1325	11	10	49	1	0.927	2.22
Louis Domingue	Quebec Remparts	18	994	11	6	41	1	0.913	2.47
Jean-François Bérubé	Montreal Junior Hockey Club	10	623	6	4	29	2	0.901	2.79
Evan Mosher	P.E.I. Rocket	5	303	1	4	15	0	0.909	2.96

== Trophies and awards ==
Team

- President's Cup: Saint John Sea Dogs
- Jean Rougeau Trophy – Regular Season Champions: Saint John Sea Dogs
- Luc Robitaille Trophy – Team that scored the most goals: Saint John Sea Dogs
- Robert Lebel Trophy – Team with best GAA: Saint John Sea Dogs

Player

- Michel Brière Memorial Trophy – Most Valuable Player: Sean Couturier, Drummondville Voltigeurs
- Jean Béliveau Trophy – Top Scorer: Philip-Michael Devos, Gatineau Olympiques / Victoriaville Tigres
- Guy Lafleur Trophy – Playoff MVP: Jonathan Huberdeau, Saint John Sea Dogs
- Jacques Plante Memorial Trophy – Top Goaltender: Jacob DeSerres, Saint John Sea Dogs
- Guy Carbonneau Trophy – Best Defensive Forward: Phillip Danault, Victoriaville Tigres
- Emile Bouchard Trophy – Defenceman of the Year: Simon Després, Saint John Sea Dogs
- Kevin Lowe Trophy – Best Defensive Defenceman: Andrew Randazzo, Drummondville Voltigeurs
- Mike Bossy Trophy – Top Prospect: Sean Couturier, Drummondville Voltigeurs
- RDS Cup – Rookie of the Year: Charles Hudon, Chicoutimi Saguenéens
- Michel Bergeron Trophy – Offensive Rookie of the Year: Charles Hudon, Chicoutimi Saguenéens
- Raymond Lagacé Trophy – Defensive Rookie of the Year: Domenic Graham, Drummondville Voltigeurs
- Frank J. Selke Memorial Trophy – Most sportsmanlike player: Philip-Michael Devos, Gatineau Olympiques / Victoriaville Tigres
- QMJHL Humanitarian of the Year – Humanitarian of the Year: Gabriel Lemieux, Shawinigan Cataractes
- Marcel Robert Trophy – Best Scholastic Player: Nicolas Therrien, Chicoutimi Saguenéens
- Paul Dumont Trophy – Personality of the Year: Louis Leblanc, Montreal Junior Hockey Club

Executive

- Ron Lapointe Trophy – Coach of the Year: Gerard Gallant – Saint John Sea Dogs
- Maurice Filion Trophy – General Manager of the Year: Mike Kelly – Saint John Sea Dogs
- John Horman Trophy – Executive of the Year: Wayne Long – Saint John Sea Dogs
- Jean Sawyer Trophy – Marketing Director of the Year: Lucie Cloutier & Yves Cinq-Mars – Quebec Remparts

== See also ==
- 2011 Memorial Cup
- List of QMJHL seasons
- 2010–11 OHL season
- 2010–11 WHL season
- 2010 in ice hockey
- 2011 in ice hockey

Preceded by 2009–10 QMJHL season	QMJHL seasons	Succeeded by 2011–12 QMJHL season
