= Höfflin =

Höfflin is a surname. Notable people with the surname include:

- Mirko Höfflin (born 1992), German ice hockey player
- Sarah Höfflin (born 1991), Swiss skier
