= Philippe Maillet =

Canadian ice hockey player

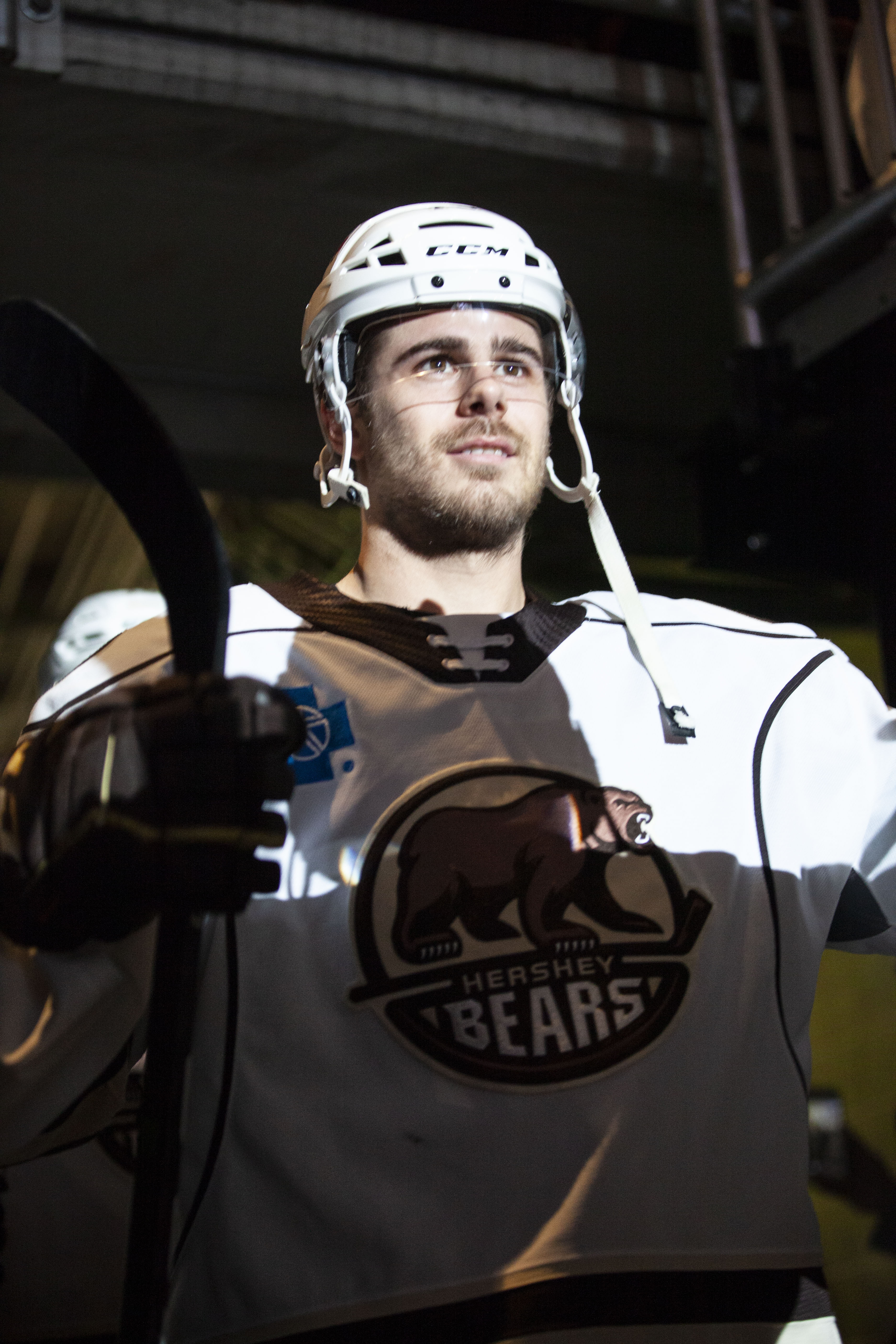
- Maillet with the Hershey Bears in 2020
- Born: November 7, 1992 (age 33) Lachenaie, Quebec, Canada
- Height: 5 ft 10 in (178 cm)
- Weight: 185 lb (84 kg; 13 st 3 lb)
- Position: Centre
- Shoots: Left
- NL team Former teams: SC Rapperswil-Jona Lakers; Ontario Reign; Washington Capitals; Metallurg Magnitogorsk; Laval Rocket; HC Ambrì-Piotta
- NHL draft: Undrafted
- Playing career: 2017–present

Philippe Maillet (born November 7, 1992) is a Canadian professional ice hockey centre who plays for the SC Rapperswil-Jona Lakers of the National League (NL). Originally undrafted by teams in the National Hockey League (NHL), Maillet has previously played for the Washington Capitals.

== Early life ==
Maillet was born on November 7, 1992, in Lachenaie, Quebec (now Terrebonne, Quebec) to firefighter Mario Maillet and consultant Line Richard.

== Playing career ==
=== Minor ===
Maillet began his youth hockey career with the Collège Esther-Blondin Phénix of the Ligue de hockey Midget AAA du Québec (QMAAA), where he set the franchise record for most assists in a season with 34. His record, which was achieved during the 2008–09 season, stayed intact until the 2011–12 season when it was topped by Laurent Dauphin. Following his record-setting season, Malliet was drafted by the Victoriaville Tigres of the Quebec Major Junior Hockey League (QMJHL) but requested that they allow him to stay in midget AAA in order to develop. He returned to Phénix where he recorded 10 points in four games before earning a chance with the Victoriaville Tigres. After playing three games for the team and recording one goal, the Tigres agreed to keep him for the remainder of the 2009–10 season. During the season, he remarked that "I prefer to play with better players than me, it pushes me to go further and it allows me to evolve faster. Besides, my ability to follow the game has greatly improved since the start of the season."

=== Junior ===
Upon completing the previous season with 12 points in 58 games, Maillet returned to the team for his first full-length campaign. During the 2010–11 season, the Tigres traded their captain Philip-Michael Devos, forcing Maillet to step up in scoring. He finished the season with a new career high of 69 points in 67 games. The following season, Maillet continued to lead the team in scoring but felt he lacked consistency. He recorded 60 points in 52 games but admitted that "since the start of the campaign, I have produced in sequence... have to work on my consistency to help the team."

Going into the 2012–13 season, Malliet acknowledged this would be his last in major junior before joining U Sports. Malliet led the Tigres in scoring with 83 points in 65 games as they qualified for the 2013 QMJHL playoffs. He competed in eight playoff games, recording nine points, before suffering an ankle injury in the second round against the Baie-Comeau Drakkar and missing the remainder of the competition. In spite of his injury, he was invited to participate in the Vancouver Canucks training camp that September.

=== University ===
Maillet attended the University of New Brunswick as he earned his Bachelor of Arts degree in business administration, playing for the UNB Varsity Reds from 2013 to 2017. Within his first 12 games with the team, he recorded 15 points including five goals. He completed his rookie season leading the Reds in scoring and finished third in the Atlantic University Sport (AUS) conference with 41 points. He received the A.J. MacAdam Trophy as the 2014 AUS Rookie of the Year, and was selected for the Second Team All-Stars and All-Rookie Team respectively.

Malliet continued his offensive output in 2014–15, leading the AUS with 39 points in 28 games. He led the Reds to the 2015 CIS University Cup championship final, where they lost to the University of Alberta Golden Bears. As a result of his play, Malliet was awarded the 2015 Kelly Trophy as League MVP and was selected as a First Team All-Star.

In the 2015–16 AUS season, an injury held back Maillet to 31 points in 17 games played. Without his assistance, the Reds won the 2016 CIS University Cup Championship.

In the 2016–17 AUS season, Maillet recorded a conference leading 55 points, in what head coach Gardiner MacDougall referred to as a "breakout season". The Varsity Reds won the 2017 U Sports University Cup national championship, with Maillet winning the Major W.J. "Danny" McLeod Award as Most Valuable Player of the tournament. He also received the 2017 U Sports Player of the Year Award and the Senator Joseph A. Sullivan trophy. Maillet received UNB's 2017 Male Athlete Of The Year Award and was named the Top Male University Athlete across Canada. Maillet concluded his collegiate career with a total of 166 points in 101 games for the UNB Reds.

=== Professional ===
On March 27, 2017, just days after winning the 2017 University Cup, Maillet signed an Amateur tryout (ATO) agreement with the Ontario Reign of the American Hockey League (AHL).

He made his AHL debut on March 31, 2017, where he scored his first professional goal in the 3–1 win over the Bakersfield Condors. He later recorded his first multi-point game in a 3–2 overtime win against the Stockton Heat on April 12. Maillet completed the 2016–17 season with the Reign and was invited to the Los Angeles Kings training camp prior to the 2017–18 season. He returned to the Reign for the season and increased his previous seasons scoring output to set a new career high in goals, assists, and points. As a result of his play, he upgraded his ATO for a standard player contract with the Reign on July 19, 2018.

Maillet was invited to return to the Reign for the 2018–19 season in what would be his last season with the team. During this season, he recorded his first professional career hat-trick in a 5–4 overtime win against the Tucson Roadrunners. His second career hat-trick would come within the same month in a 7–6 game shootout win over the San Diego Gulls. He ended the season with a career high 54 points in 68 games, garnering the interest of the Washington Capitals organization. He officially left the Reign on July 1, 2019, after signing a two-year, two-way $700,000 contract with the Capitals.

Maillet began the 2019–20 season with the Capitals' AHL affiliate, the Hershey Bears, where he recorded 44 points in 61 games. As a result of the COVID-19 pandemic in North America, the AHL suspended play and he was invited to the Washington Capitals return to play camp on July 13.

After two seasons with the Capitals organization, Maillet, as an impending free agent, left North America and signed a one-year contract with Russian club Metallurg Magnitogorsk of the Kontinental Hockey League (KHL), on June 11, 2021.

After two prolific seasons in Russia, on July 1, 2023, Maillet returned to North America as a free agent and signed a one-year, two-way contract with the Montreal Canadiens for the 2023–24 season. Maillet was unable to add to his NHL experience, and played exclusively with AHL affiliate the Laval Rocket, posting a team-leading 21 goals for 53 points in 67 regular season games.

As a free agent following a lone season within the Canadiens organization, Maillet opted for a return abroad in securing a one-year deal with HC Ambrì-Piotta of the Swiss-based National League (NL), on July 28, 2024.

In November 2025, Maillet signed with the SC Rapperswil-Jona Lakers of the NL.

== Career statistics ==
			Regular season					Playoffs
Season	Team	League	GP	G	A	Pts	PIM	GP	G	A	Pts	PIM
2008–09	Collège Esther-Blondin Phénix	QMAAA	45	26	34	60	22	15	7	10	17	4
2009–10	Collège Esther-Blondin Phénix	QMAAA	4	5	5	10	0	—	—	—	—	—
2009–10	Victoriaville Tigres	QMJHL	58	3	9	12	4	16	6	1	7	2
2010–11	Victoriaville Tigres	QMJHL	67	31	38	69	17	9	4	10	14	2
2011–12	Victoriaville Tigres	QMJHL	62	33	43	76	28	4	2	1	3	2
2012–13	Victoriaville Tigres	QMJHL	65	25	58	83	17	8	2	7	9	0
2013–14	UNB Varsity Reds	CIS-AUS	26	16	25	41	4	4	0	1	1	0
2014–15	UNB Varsity Reds	CIS-AUS	28	14	25	39	28	7	5	2	7	0
2015–16	UNB Varsity Reds	CIS-AUS	17	7	24	31	4	5	2	2	4	0
2016–17	UNB Varsity Reds	CIS-AUS	30	23	32	55	26	9	8	8	16	4
2016–17	Ontario Reign	AHL	8	2	2	4	4	4	0	0	0	0
2017–18	Ontario Reign	AHL	64	18	18	36	18	4	2	0	2	4
2018–19	Ontario Reign	AHL	68	16	38	54	20	—	—	—	—	—
2019–20	Hershey Bears	AHL	61	17	27	44	18	—	—	—	—	—
2020–21	Washington Capitals	NHL	2	0	0	0	0	—	—	—	—	—
2020–21	Hershey Bears	AHL	16	6	15	21	8	—	—	—	—	—
2021–22	Metallurg Magnitogorsk	KHL	47	15	24	39	14	23	8	13	21	6
2022–23	Metallurg Magnitogorsk	KHL	66	22	31	53	18	11	1	5	6	4
2023–24	Laval Rocket	AHL	67	21	32	53	14	—	—	—	—	—
2024–25	HC Ambrì-Piotta	NL	43	15	23	38	10	4	2	0	2	2
NHL totals			2	0	0	0	0	—	—	—	—	—
KHL totals			113	37	55	92	32	34	9	18	27	10

== Awards and honours ==
CIS University Hockey
Award	Year	Ref
Second Team All-Stars	2014	
All-Rookie Team	2014	
A.J. MacAdam Trophy	2014	
Kelly Trophy	2015	
First Team All-Stars	2015	
BLG Awards	2017	
Major W.J. "Danny" McLeod Award	2017	
