= Frederick Roy =

Canadian ice hockey player

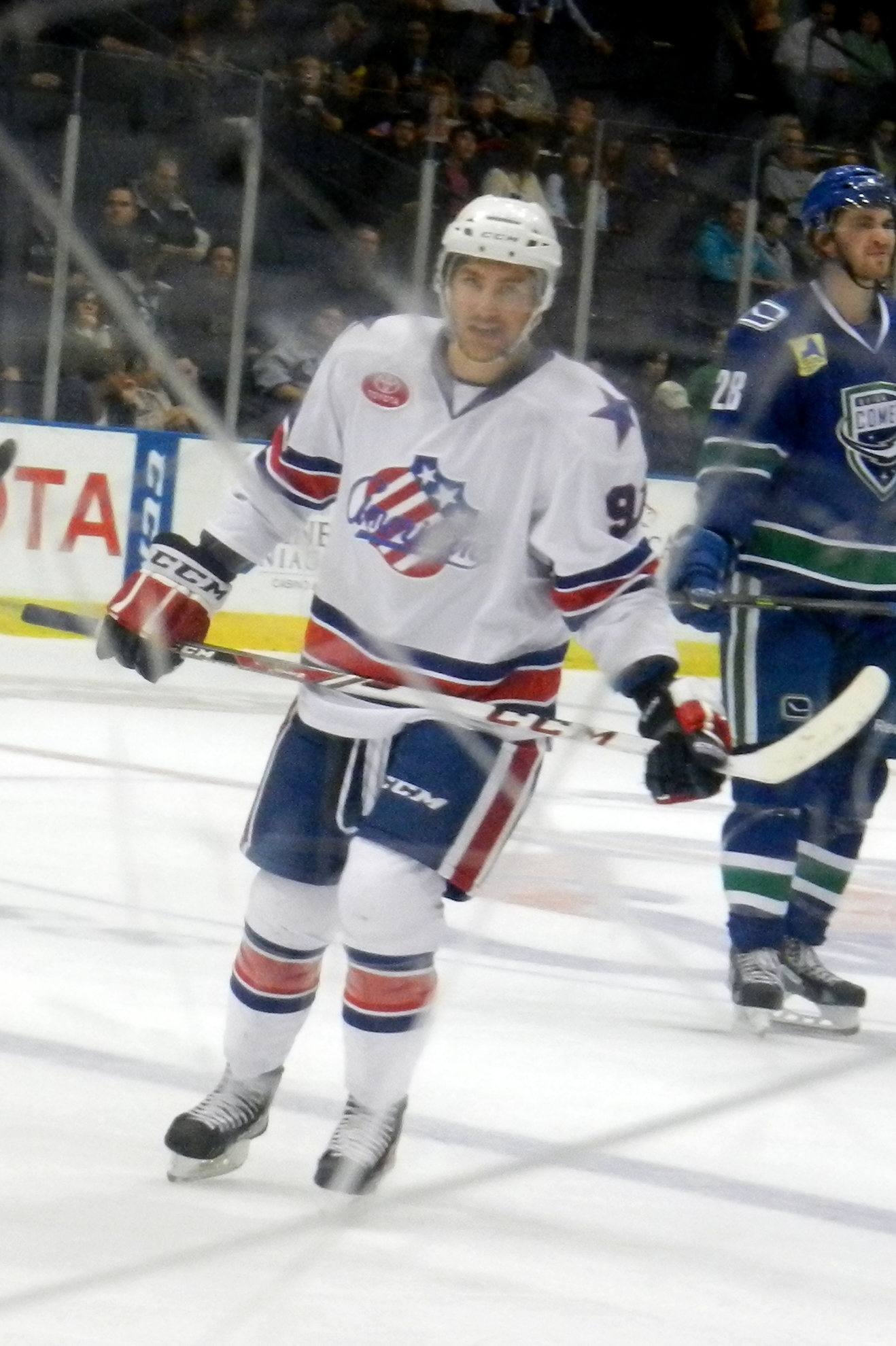
- Roy with the Rochester Americans in 2013
- Born: February 26, 1991 (age 34) Montreal, Quebec, Canada
- Height: 5 ft 10 in (178 cm)
- Weight: 160 lb (73 kg; 11 st 6 lb)
- Position: Centre
- Shot: Left
- Played for: Rochester Americans
- NHL draft: Undrafted
- Playing career: 2012–2014

Frederick Piuze-Roy (born February 26, 1991) is a Canadian former professional ice hockey player. Roy played two seasons of professional hockey in the American Hockey League with the Rochester Americans.

== Playing career ==
Roy played major junior hockey with the Quebec Remparts of the Quebec Major Junior Hockey League (QMJHL). Early in the 2008–09 season, Roy received a 15 games suspension from the QMJHL for high sticking Vincent Bourgeois of the Montreal Juniors.

Roy was signed to his first professional contract with the Rochester Americans, affiliate of the Buffalo Sabres, for the 2012–13 season. In 64 games with the Amerks, Roy contributed with 10 points from a checking-line role.

On July 10, 2013, he was re-signed by the Amerks to an additional one-year contract. In the 2013–14 season, Roy matched his career high with 8 goals in 52 games with the Amerks. He competed for the Amerks in the 2013 Spengler Cup.

After two seasons with Rochester, and with limited interest as a free agent, Roy opted to end his professional career intending to go back to school and further his education.

== Personal ==
His father is the Hall of Fame goaltender Patrick Roy.

== Career statistics ==
			Regular season					Playoffs
Season	Team	League	GP	G	A	Pts	PIM	GP	G	A	Pts	PIM
2007–08	Quebec Remparts	QMJHL	5	0	0	0	0	—	—	—	—	—
2008–09	Quebec Remparts	QMJHL	50	7	17	24	62	17	2	1	3	23
2009–10	Quebec Remparts	QMJHL	4	2	4	6	5	4	0	0	0	9
2010–11	Quebec Remparts	QMJHL	65	26	32	58	58	18	8	11	19	20
2011–12	Quebec Remparts	QMJHL	64	27	65	92	88	11	2	10	12	6
2012–13	Rochester Americans	AHL	64	8	2	10	62	—	—	—	—	—
2013–14	Rochester Americans	AHL	53	8	4	12	124	2	1	0	1	2
AHL totals			117	16	6	22	186	2	1	0	1	2

== Awards and honours ==
Award	Year
Guy Carbonneau Trophy - QMJHL Best Defensive Forward	2011–12
QMJHL First All-Star Team	2011–12
