= Alexandre Grenier =

Canadian ice hockey player (born 1991)

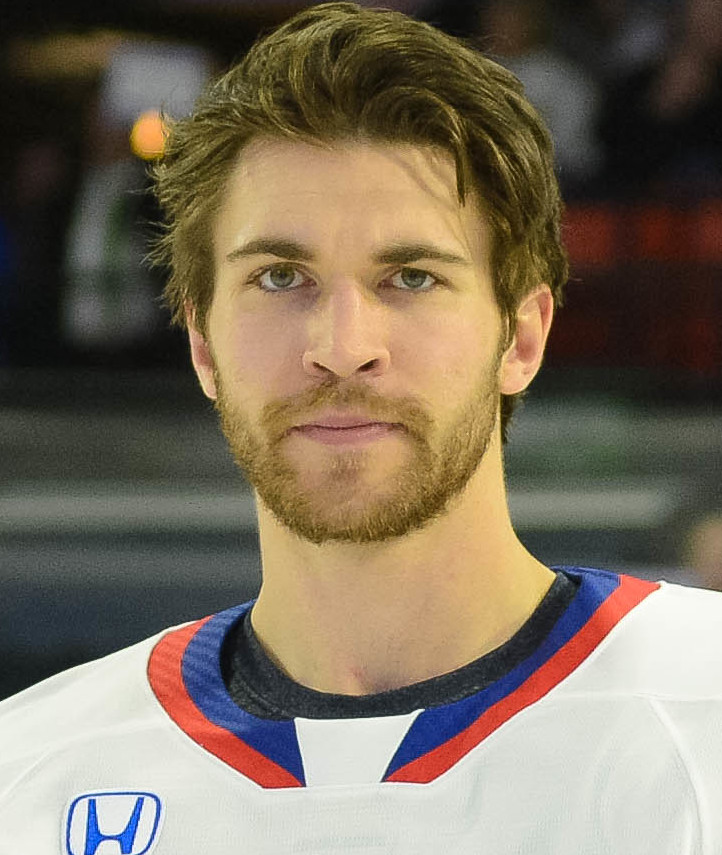
- Grenier in the 2018 AHL All-Star Game
- Born: September 5, 1991 (age 35) Laval, Quebec, Canada
- Height: 6 ft 5 in (196 cm)
- Weight: 211 lb (96 kg; 15 st 1 lb)
- Position: Right wing
- Shoots: Right
- DEL team Former teams: Augsburger Panther; EC Red Bull Salzburg; Vancouver Canucks; Iserlohn Roosters; Lausanne HC; SCL Tigers; Eisbären Berlin; Kölner Haie
- NHL draft: 90th overall, 2011; Vancouver Canucks
- Playing career: 2012–present

Alexandre Grenier (born September 5, 1991) is a Canadian professional ice hockey player. He is playing with Augsburger Panther of the Deutsche Eishockey Liga (DEL). Grenier was selected by the Vancouver Canucks in the 3rd round (90th overall) of the 2011 NHL entry draft.

== Playing career ==
As a youth, Grenier played in the 2004 Quebec International Pee-Wee Hockey Tournament with a minor ice hockey team from Collège Charles-Lemoyne.

Grenier made his professional debut playing with EC Red Bull Salzburg of the Austrian Hockey League during the 2012–13 season. After 25 games with the Red Bulls, Grenier opted to return to North America, signing an AHL deal for the remainder of the season with the Canucks AHL affiliate, the Chicago Wolves on January 6, 2013. After the season with the Wolves, Grenier was belatedly signed by the Canucks to a two-year entry-level contract on April 30, 2013.

In his fourth season within the Canucks organization during the 2015–16 season, Grenier's development was rewarded with receiving his first NHL recall on November 18, 2015. He made his NHL debut with the Canucks later that night in a 4–1 loss to the Winnipeg Jets at the MTS Centre. On March 14, 2016, Grenier was recalled to the Vancouver Canucks, as Brendan Gaunce had been reassigned to the Utica Comets.

On July 1, 2017, Grenier signed a one-year, two-way contract with the Florida Panthers after he did not receive a contract offer from the Canucks. He was assigned to AHL affiliate, the Springfield Thunderbirds for the duration of the 2017–18 season, notching a professional high 20 goals in amassing 44 points in 72 games.

Having left the Panthers organization as a free agent, Grenier signed a one-year AHL contract with his hometown club, the Laval Rocket, on July 1, 2018.

Following the conclusion of his contract with the Rocket, Grenier, a free agent, opted to continue his career in Europe, agreeing to a one-year contract for the 2019–20 season with the German outfit Iserlohn Roosters of the DEL on October 15, 2019. After agreeing to a one-year contract extension with the Roosters, on February 3, 2020, Grenier joined Lausanne HC on loan to provide depth for the final playoffs push. He made 10 appearances with Lausanne before the season was cancelled due to the COVID-19 pandemic, later returning to resume his contract with Iserlohn.

On April 27, 2021, Grenier returned to the National League (NL) and agreed to a one-year contract with the SCL Tigers for the 2021–22 season.

Following a return to the DEL with Eisbären Berlin, Grenier left after one season and moved to fellow German club Kölner Haie on July 21, 2023.

Grenier appeared with the Sharks for two seasons, before continuing his tenure in the DEL with rival club, Augsburger Panther, on a one-year contract on June 26, 2025.

== Career statistics ==
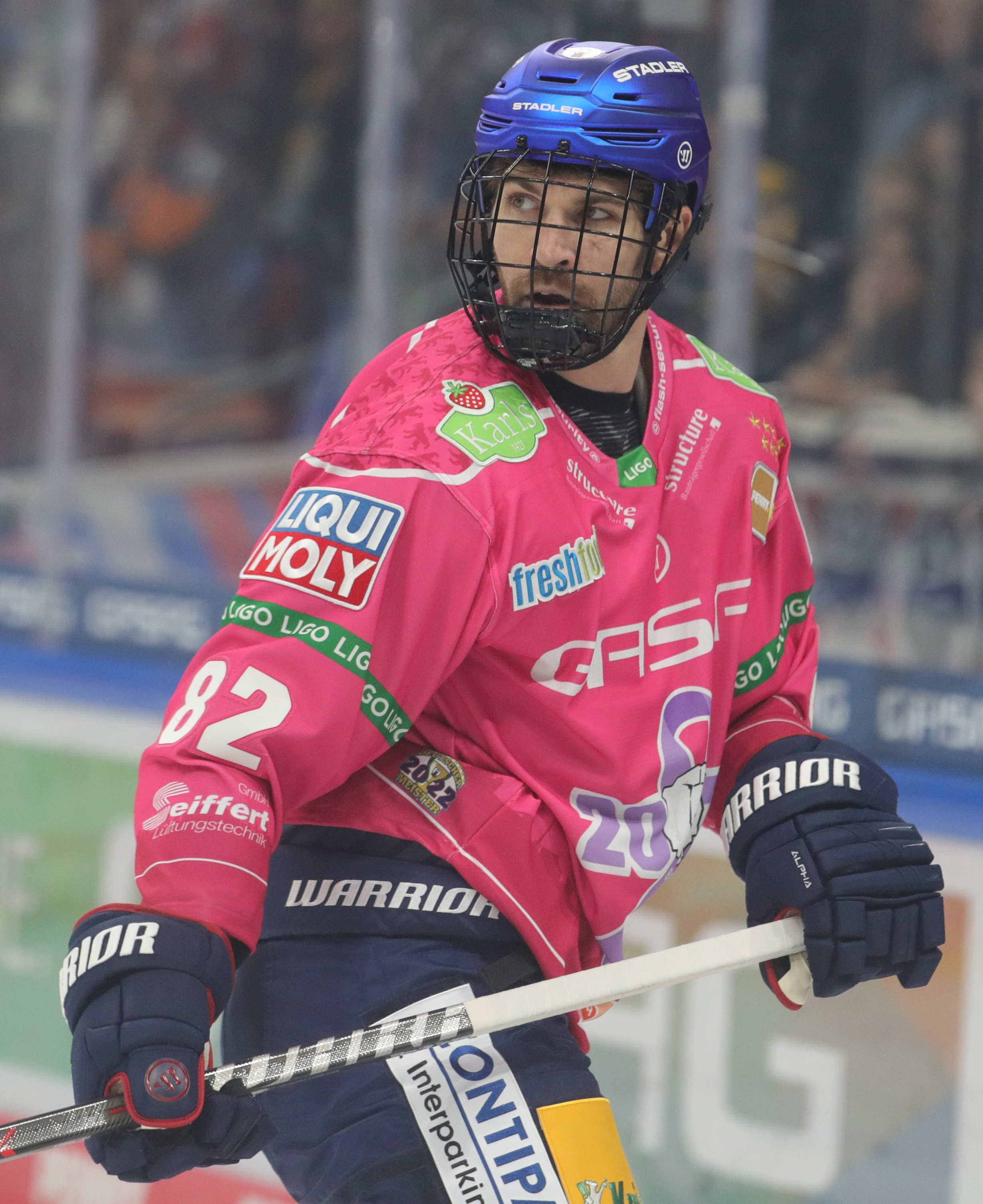
Grenier with Eisbären Berlin (2022)

			Regular season					Playoffs
Season	Team	League	GP	G	A	Pts	PIM	GP	G	A	Pts	PIM
2008–09	St-Jérôme Panthers	QJAAAHL	2	0	0	0	0	—	—	—	—	—
2009–10	St-Jérôme Panthers	QJAAAHL	51	26	28	54	63	7	1	3	4	2
2010–11	St-Jérôme Panthers	QJAAAHL	33	25	35	60	34	—	—	—	—	—
2010–11	Quebec Remparts	QMJHL	31	9	15	24	29	15	8	8	16	4
2011–12	Halifax Mooseheads	QMJHL	64	25	39	64	42	17	4	12	16	19
2012–13	EC Red Bull Salzburg	EBEL	25	5	8	13	21	—	—	—	—	—
2012–13	Chicago Wolves	AHL	4	0	0	0	2	—	—	—	—	—
2012–13	Kalamazoo Wings	ECHL	37	10	21	31	51	—	—	—	—	—
2013–14	Utica Comets	AHL	68	17	22	39	56	—	—	—	—	—
2014–15	Utica Comets	AHL	67	17	26	43	71	23	6	9	15	25
2015–16	Utica Comets	AHL	69	16	32	48	43	4	2	1	3	2
2015–16	Vancouver Canucks	NHL	6	0	0	0	2	—	—	—	—	—
2016–17	Utica Comets	AHL	69	17	28	45	52	—	—	—	—	—
2016–17	Vancouver Canucks	NHL	3	0	0	0	0	—	—	—	—	—
2017–18	Springfield Thunderbirds	AHL	72	20	24	44	78	—	—	—	—	—
2018–19	Laval Rocket	AHL	68	11	16	27	54	—	—	—	—	—
2019–20	Iserlohn Roosters	DEL	32	11	12	23	32	—	—	—	—	—
2019–20	Lausanne HC	NL	10	4	4	8	4	—	—	—	—	—
2020–21	Iserlohn Roosters	DEL	35	12	27	39	12	3	0	3	3	6
2021–22	SCL Tigers	NL	47	13	35	48	47	—	—	—	—	—
2022–23	SCL Tigers	NL	6	2	0	2	0	—	—	—	—	—
2022–23	Eisbären Berlin	DEL	32	6	16	22	14	—	—	—	—	—
2023–24	Kölner Haie	DEL	50	14	25	39	49	3	1	3	4	2
2024–25	Kölner Haie	DEL	41	17	25	42	18	17	10	7	17	12
NHL totals			9	0	0	0	2	—	—	—	—	—
DEL totals			190	60	105	165	125	23	11	13	24	20

== Awards and honours ==
Award	Year
AHL
All-Star Game	2017, 2018
