= 2017 U Sports University Cup =

Tournament details
- Venue(s): Aitken Centre, Fredericton, New Brunswick
- Dates: March 16–19, 2017
- Teams: 8

Final positions
- Champions: New Brunswick Varsity Reds (7th title)
- Runners-up: Saskatchewan Huskies
- Third place: Acadia Axemen
- Fourth place: St. Francis Xavier X-Men

Tournament statistics
- Games played: 8
- Attendance: 24,000 (3,000 per game)

Awards
- MVP: Philippe Maillet (New Brunswick)

The 2017 U Sports Men's University Cup Hockey Tournament (55th Annual) was held March 16–19, 2017, in Fredericton, New Brunswick, to determine a national champion for the 2016–17 U Sports men's ice hockey season. The tournament was played at the Aitken Centre on UNB's Fredericton campus. This event marked the first year of a successful two-year bid to host the 2017 and 2018 USports University Cup. This is the 3rd time UNB has hosted the University Cup – they first hosted a two-year bid in 2003 and 2004 and again in 2011 and 2012. UNB is the first program to host the event 3 times since the expanded format was introduced in 1998.

The UNB Varsity Reds won their 7th title (6th under head coach Gardiner MacDougall) and their first title defense over the Saskatchewan Huskies coached by Dave Adolph. The #5 seed has appeared in the finals six times since the expanded format started in 1998 and has won three titles; UNB in each case (2007, 2016 and 2017). The #6 seed has appeared in 4 finals and has not yet won.

UNB's title defense follows on the heels of Alberta's back-to-back titles in 2014 and 2015.

UNB and Alberta are the only two teams to host and win since the expanded format was introduced in 1998 – they each have two titles at home (Alberta – 2005 and 2006 / UNB – 2011 and 2017)

This is the 3rd straight appearance for UNB in the finals (2015-Silver, 2016-Gold and 2017 Gold). This has only occurred three other times going back to 1983 (34 years):

- UNB (2007-Gold, 2008-Silver, 2009-Gold)
- UQTR (2001-Gold, 2002-Silver, 2003-Gold)
- Saskatchewan (1981-Silver, 1982-Silver, 1983-Gold)

== Road to the Cup ==
=== AUS playoffs ===
Quarter-finals (Best of 3)
4	Saint Mary's Huskies	2
5	UPEI Panthers	1
3	St. Francis Xavier X-Men	2
6	Moncton Aigles Bleu

Semi-finals (Best of 5)
1	UNB Varsity Reds	3
4	Saint Mary's Huskies	1
2	Acadia Axemen	0
3	St. Francis Xavier X-Men	3

AUS Championship (Best of 3)
1	UNB Varsity Reds	0
3	St. Francis Xavier X-Men	2
Third place
2	Acadia Axemen	2
4	Saint Mary's Huskies	0

=== OUA playoffs ===
Division Quarter-finals (Best of 3); OUA Sweet 16	Division Semi-finals (Best of 3); OUA Quarter-Finals
1E	McGill Redmen	2
8E	Laurentian Voyageurs	0
1E	McGill Redmen	2
5E	UQTR Patriotes	0
4E	Carleton Ravens	1
5E	UQTR Patriotes	2
OUA East
2E	Concordia Stingers	2
7E	UOIT Ridgebacks	1
2E	Concordia Stingers	1
3E	Queen's Golden Gaels	2
3E	Queen's Golden Gaels	2
6E	Ottawa Gee Gees	1
1W	Ryerson Rams	2
8W	Waterloo Warriors	1
1W	Ryerson Rams	0
5W	Windsor Lancers	2
4W	Laurier Golden Hawks	1
5W	Windsor Lancers	2
OUA West
2W	York Lions	2
7W	Lakehead Thunderwolves	0
2W	York Lions	2
3W	Guelph Gryphons	0
3W	Guelph Gryphons	2
6W	Brock Badgers	0

Division Finals (Best of 3); OUA Semi-Finals
1E	McGill Redmen	0
3E	Queen's Golden Gaels	2
5W	Windsor Lancers	1
2W	York Lions	2

Queen's Cup (Single Game); OUA Championship
3E	Queen's Golden Gaels (V)	3
2W	York Lions (H)	4

Bronze Medal (Single Game)
1E	McGill Redmen (H)	6
5W	Windsor Lancers (V)	3

Note: UQTR Patriotes forfeit all games from January 25, 2017, to February 25, 2017, as well as their first 13 games of the next season, due to an ineligible player. Their original 2016–17 record of 16–10–2 (34 points for 5th) was corrected to 13–13–2 (28 points for 7th). However, this change is not reflected here because the foul and subsequent forfeitures were not announced until January 18, 2018 (the following season) when the infraction became known.

=== Canada West playoffs ===
Quarter-finals (Best of 3)
4	Mount Royal Cougars	2
5	Manitoba Bison	1
3	Calgary Dinos	2
6	UBC Thunderbirds	0

Semi-finals (Best of 3)
1	Saskatchewan Huskies	2
4	Mount Royal Cougars	0
2	Alberta Golden Bears	2
3	Calgary Dinos	0

Canada West Championship (Best of 3)
1	Saskatchewan Huskies	1
2	Alberta Golden Bears	2

== University Cup tournament ==
The eight teams to advance to the tournament are listed below. The three conference champions must be seeded 1–3 followed by the OUA Runner-up (seed #4). The remaining four seeds are for the AUS Finalist, Canada West Finalist, OUA Third-place and host. Their seedings are based on the pre-tournament rankings. Since UNB advanced as the AUS Runner-up, Acadia would represent the host.

Rank	Seed	Team	Qualified
1	1	Alberta Golden Bears	Canada West Champion
2	2	St. Francis Xavier X-Men	AUS Champion
5	3	York Lions	OUA Champion
6	4	Queen's Golden Gaels	OUA Finalist
3	5	UNB Varsity Reds	AUS Finalist
4	6	Saskatchewan Huskies	Canada West Finalist
7	7	McGill Redmen	OUA Third Place
8	8	Acadia Axemen	Host

=== Weather ===
A Nor'easter traveled across Ontario, Quebec, New England and the Maritimes on Tuesday, two days before the tournament started. The storm cancelled flights east out of Toronto, Ottawa and Montreal. This impacted Queen's who had scheduled to leave on Tuesday by bus to Toronto where they would fly to Fredericton. They were informed their flight was cancelled and they instead booked a bus to Fredericton leaving Tuesday afternoon. They got as far as Quebec City where they stayed the night. McGill had also started their journey by bus on Tuesday and got as far as Riviere-du-Loup.

Poor road conditions and road closures stranded both teams for the entire day on Wednesday in their respective locations. As such they were not able to attend the UCup Gala on Wednesday night. They continued their journeys on Thursday and both arrive mid-day on Thursday. This had the biggest impact on Queen's who was scheduled to play UNB that night at 7 pm local (AST). The game was delayed by 1 hour to 8pm to provide Queen's some additional time to prepare. The travel impact was less for McGill whose first game wasn't until Friday.

Saskatchewan Huskies arrived on Monday but not all of their equipment did – they had to purchase a sizable amount of equipment from a local sporting goods store to outfit the team for their first practice on Tuesday. The missing bags did arrive late Wednesday.

=== Tournament format ===
The tournament is a traditional 8 team, single elimination ladder with bronze medal game between the two semi-final losers. Games that are tied after regulation play a 10-minute overtime period following the 3rd period. If there is no score after the first overtime, the ice is cleaned and they would play 20 minute periods (with ice cleaned between periods) until there is a winner.

The higher seed is the 'Home' team for each game (the home team must wear their 'white' jerseys and will get the last change during stoppages of play).

The UNB Varsity Reds played as the visitor in games 1 but as the home team in games 2 and 3. The Saskatchewan Huskies were the visitor in all three of their games.

Quarter-finals (Single Game)
1	Alberta Golden Bears	1
8	Acadia Axemen	4
Thursday
4	Queen's Golden Gaels	1
5	UNB Varsity Reds	5
2	St. Francis Xavier X-Men	4
7	McGill Redmen	1
Friday
3	York Lions	0
6	Saskatchewan Huskies	1 OT1

Semi-finals (Single Game)
8	Acadia Axemen	0
5	UNB Varsity Reds	3
2	St. Francis Xavier X-Men	0
6	Saskatchewan Huskies	8

Championship final (Single Game)
5	UNB Varsity Reds	5
6	Saskatchewan Huskies	3

Bronze Medal (Single Game)
8	Acadia Axemen	7
2	St. Francis Xavier X-Men	3

== Bronze game ==
March 19, 2017; 09:30 (local)	Acadia Axemen #8	7–3 (2–0, 4–2, 1–1)	St. Francis Xavier X-Men #2	Aitken Centre, Fredericton; Attendance: 2,624 (80.0%)

Game reference

Robert Steeves (1–1)
Goalies
Chase Marchand (1–1)
Referees:
Korey Bannerman
Colin Watt
Linesmen:
David Geris
Jesse Marquis

M. Clarke (1) (M. Pufahl) – 01:13	1–0
M. Clarke (2) (M. McNulty) (PP) – 16:01	2–0
	2–1	20:14 – S. Studnicka (1) (M. Tremaine)
B. Leier (1) (B. Thompson) (SH) – 32:03	3–1
L. Maaskant (1) (D. Pettersson) – 32:34	4–1
D. Pettersson (1) (B. Leier, T. Makin) – 33:30	5–1
	5–2	38:26 – E. Locke (1) (H. Cook, K. Kontos )
D. Pettersson (2) (A. Lepkowski, M. Clarke) – 39:38	6–2
	6–3	43:25 – N. Pancel (1) (R. Spears, C. Macdonald )
T. Makin (1) (S. Trask, D. Pettersson) – 59:44	7–3

5 for 10 min
Penalties
6 for 20 min
34
Shots
29

Game MVPs: Michael Clarke (ACD) and Eric Locke (SFX)

== Championship final ==
March 19, 2016; 1:00 (local); Sportsnet 360; TVA Sports 2	UNB Varsity Reds #5	5–3 (2–1, 4–2, 5–3)	Saskatchewan Huskies #6	Aitken Centre, Fredericton; Attendance: 3374 (102.9%)

Game reference

Étienne Marcoux (2–0)
Goalies
Jordon Cooke (2–0)
Referees:
Stephen Starzomski
Jonathan Alarie
Linesmen:
Mike MacDonnell
Josh DeYoung

C. Braes (1) (P. Maillet, C. Clappert) – 4:04	1–0
	1–1	10:47 – C. Gay (1) (unassisted)
M. Simpson (1) (P. Halley, M. Petgrave) – 12:19	2–1
C. Braes (2) (P. Maillet, C. Clappert) – 23:17	3–1
C. Braes (3) (P. Maillet, R. Mignardi) (PP) – 26:16	4–1
	4–2	28:25 – J. Fransoo (C. Gay and A. Johnson) (PP)
	4–3	44:17 – Kohl Bauml (C. Gay and L. McVeigh) (PP)
C. Braes (4) (J. Murray, P. Maillet) (PP) – 48:50	5–3

6 for 20 min
Penalties
3 for 6 min
36
Shots
21

Game MVPs: Cam Braes (UNB) and Connor Gay (USK)

== Tournament All-Stars ==
Philippe Maillet, from the UNB Varsity Reds, was selected as the Major W.J. 'Danny' McLeod Award for U Sports University Cup MVP. Maillet had 4 goals and 6 assist for 10 points in 3 games. 3 of his goals were scored in their quarter-final game vs Queen's (a hat trick) and 4 of his assists were scored in the gold medal game.

Joining Maillet on the tournament all-star team were:
Forward Cam Braes (UNB Varsity Reds)
Forward Levi Cable (Saskatchewan Huskies)
Defenceman Geoff Schemitsch (Acadia Axemen)
Defenceman Jesse Forsberg (Saskatchewan Huskies)
Goalie Étienne Marcoux (UNB Varsity Reds)
