= Hubert Labrie =

Canadian ice hockey player

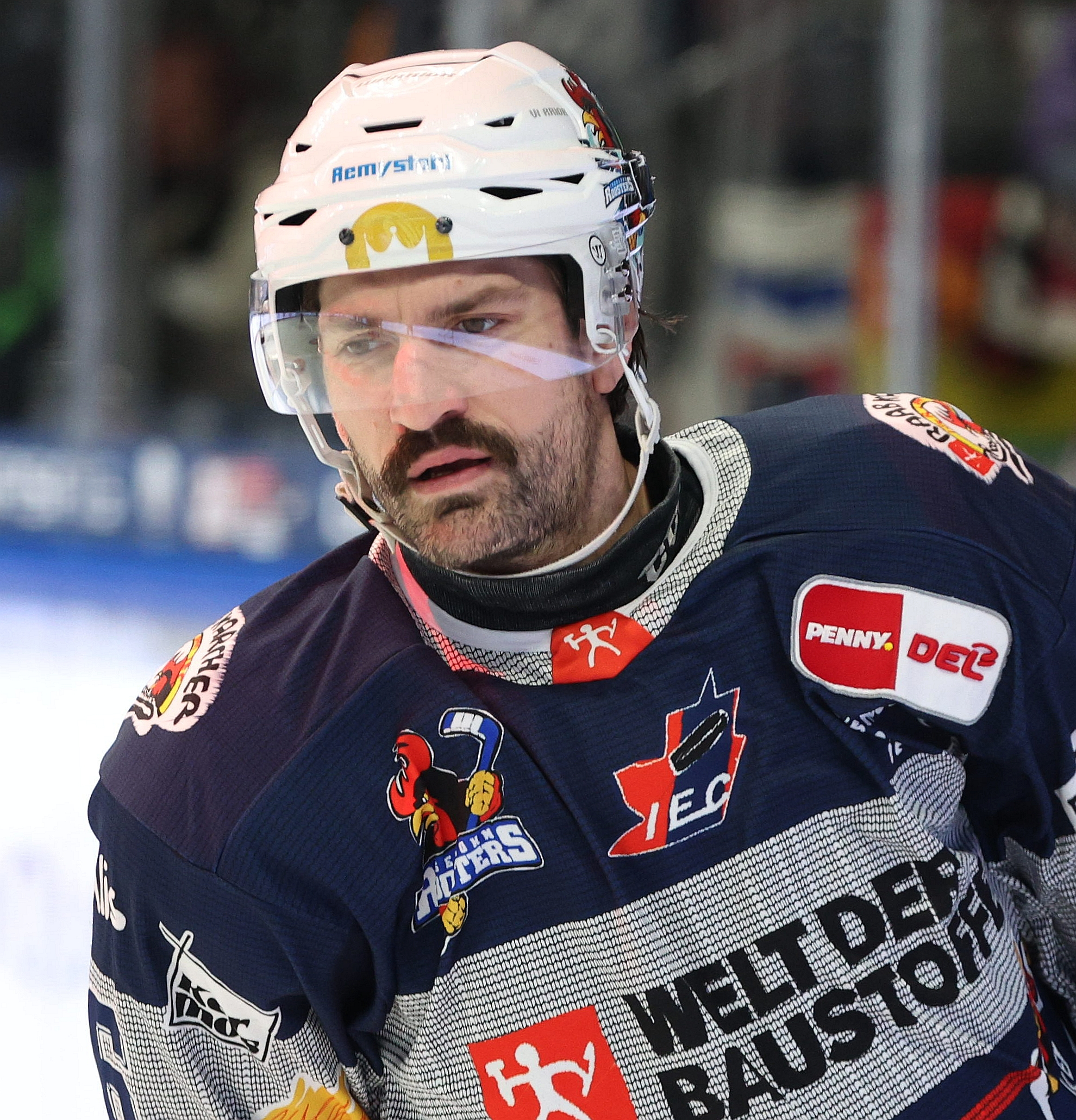
- Labrie with the Iserlohn Roosters in 2024
- Born: July 12, 1991 (age 35) Victoriaville, Quebec, Canada
- Height: 5 ft 11 in (180 cm)
- Weight: 168 lb (76 kg; 12 st 0 lb)
- Position: Defence
- Shoots: Left
- team Former teams: Free agent Texas Stars; Springfield Falcons; San Antonio Rampage; Chicago Wolves; Hershey Bears; Hartford Wolf Pack; Syracuse Crunch; Belleville Senators; Iserlohn Roosters
- NHL draft: Undrafted
- Playing career: 2011–present

Hubert Labrie (born July 12, 1991) is a Canadian professional ice hockey defenceman who is currently an unrestricted free agent. He most recently played for the Iserlohn Roosters of the Deutsche Eishockey Liga (DEL).

== Playing career ==
Labrie played four seasons (2007–2011) of major junior hockey with the Gatineau Olympiques of the Quebec Major Junior Hockey League scoring 48 points and registering 268 penalty minutes in 192 games played.

On September 18, 2009, the Dallas Stars signed Labrie to a three-year entry-level contract, however he did not begin to play professionally until the 2011–12 season. Labrie played the duration of his contract, within the Stars affiliates, the Texas Stars and the Idaho Steelheads.

On July 25, 2014, Hoeffel was signed as a free agent to a one-year AHL contract with the Springfield Falcons. As a rotating depth defenseman with the Falcons in the 2014–15 season, Labrie appeared in a career high 46 games for 9 points from the blueline.

On the off-season as a free agent, Labrie returned to the state of Texas in July, signing a one-year AHL contract with the San Antonio Rampage. As an affiliate of the Colorado Avalanche, Labrie would also attend the clubs NHL training camp. After attending the 2015 Avalanche training camp, Labrie was returned to the Rampage without a contract offer to begin the 2015–16 season. Initially assuming the role as the reserve defenseman, Labrie became a regular feature on the blueline appearing in 50 games for 7 assists. On March 5, 2016, Labrie was traded by the Rampage to the Chicago Wolves for future considerations.

As a free agent, Labrie joined his fifth AHL club, in agreeing to a one-year contract with the Hershey Bears on July 7, 2016. On February 9, 2018, the Bears' parent club, the Washington Capitals, included Labrie in a trade to the New York Rangers AHL affiliate, the Hartford Wolf Pack.

On July 1, 2018, Labrie continued his tour of the AHL, agreeing to a one-year contract as a free agent with the Syracuse Crunch, affiliate to the Tampa Bay Lightning. In the 2018–19 season, Labrie played as a fixture on the Crunch's blueline, contributing with 10 assists in 69 regular season games.

Having left the Crunch as a free agent at seasons end, Labrie agreed to a one-year AHL contract with the Belleville Senators on July 8, 2019. During the 2019–20 season, Labrie added a veteran presence to Belleville's blueline contributing with 8 points through 43 games. On February 23, 2020, Labrie was signed to just his second NHL contract, agreeing to a two-way deal for the remainder of the season with affiliate club, the Ottawa Senators.

At the conclusion of his contract with the Senators, Labrie as a free agent opted to remain within the Senators organization, returning to Belleville on a one-year AHL contract on October 29, 2020.

Following his 10th season in the AHL, Labrie signed his first contract abroad in agreeing to a one-year contract with German club, Iserlohn Roosters of the DEL, on May 28, 2021.

== Career statistics ==
=== Regular season and playoffs ===
			Regular season					Playoffs
Season	Team	League	GP	G	A	Pts	PIM	GP	G	A	Pts	PIM
2007–08	Gatineau Olympiques	QMJHL	61	2	15	17	79	19	1	3	4	26
2008–09	Gatineau Olympiques	QMJHL	55	1	3	4	82	5	0	0	0	14
2009–10	Gatineau Olympiques	QMJHL	67	4	16	20	99	11	3	4	7	20
2010–11	Gatineau Olympiques	QMJHL	9	3	4	7	8	24	4	8	12	30
2011–12	Texas Stars	AHL	33	2	1	3	18	—	—	—	—	—
2011–12	Idaho Steelheads	ECHL	8	1	4	5	0	6	0	0	0	4
2012–13	Texas Stars	AHL	27	0	3	3	45	—	—	—	—	—
2012–13	Idaho Steelheads	ECHL	22	2	3	5	46	17	0	1	1	21
2013–14	Texas Stars	AHL	40	2	5	7	49	4	0	0	0	6
2013–14	Idaho Steelheads	ECHL	4	0	0	0	7	—	—	—	—	—
2014–15	Springfield Falcons	AHL	46	1	8	9	65	—	—	—	—	—
2015–16	San Antonio Rampage	AHL	50	0	7	7	61	—	—	—	—	—
2015–16	Chicago Wolves	AHL	15	2	2	4	20	—	—	—	—	—
2016–17	Hershey Bears	AHL	70	3	8	11	66	12	0	4	4	4
2017–18	Hershey Bears	AHL	35	1	6	7	26	—	—	—	—	—
2017–18	Hartford Wolf Pack	AHL	26	1	1	2	38	—	—	—	—	—
2018–19	Syracuse Crunch	AHL	69	0	10	10	73	4	0	0	0	2
2019–20	Belleville Senators	AHL	50	0	9	9	41	—	—	—	—	—
2020–21	Belleville Senators	AHL	29	0	3	3	33	—	—	—	—	—
2021–22	Iserlohn Roosters	DEL	48	3	10	13	70	—	—	—	—	—
2022–23	Iserlohn Roosters	DEL	45	3	11	14	62	—	—	—	—	—
2023–24	Iserlohn Roosters	DEL	33	1	2	3	45	—	—	—	—	—
2024–25	Iserlohn Roosters	DEL	52	1	5	6	54	—	—	—	—	—
AHL totals			490	12	63	75	535	20	0	4	4	12

=== International ===
Year	Team	Event	Result	GP	G	A	Pts	PIM
2008	Canada Quebec	U17	7th	5	0	0	0	10
Junior totals				5	0	0	0	10
