= Tomáš Filippi =

Czech ice hockey player (born 1992)

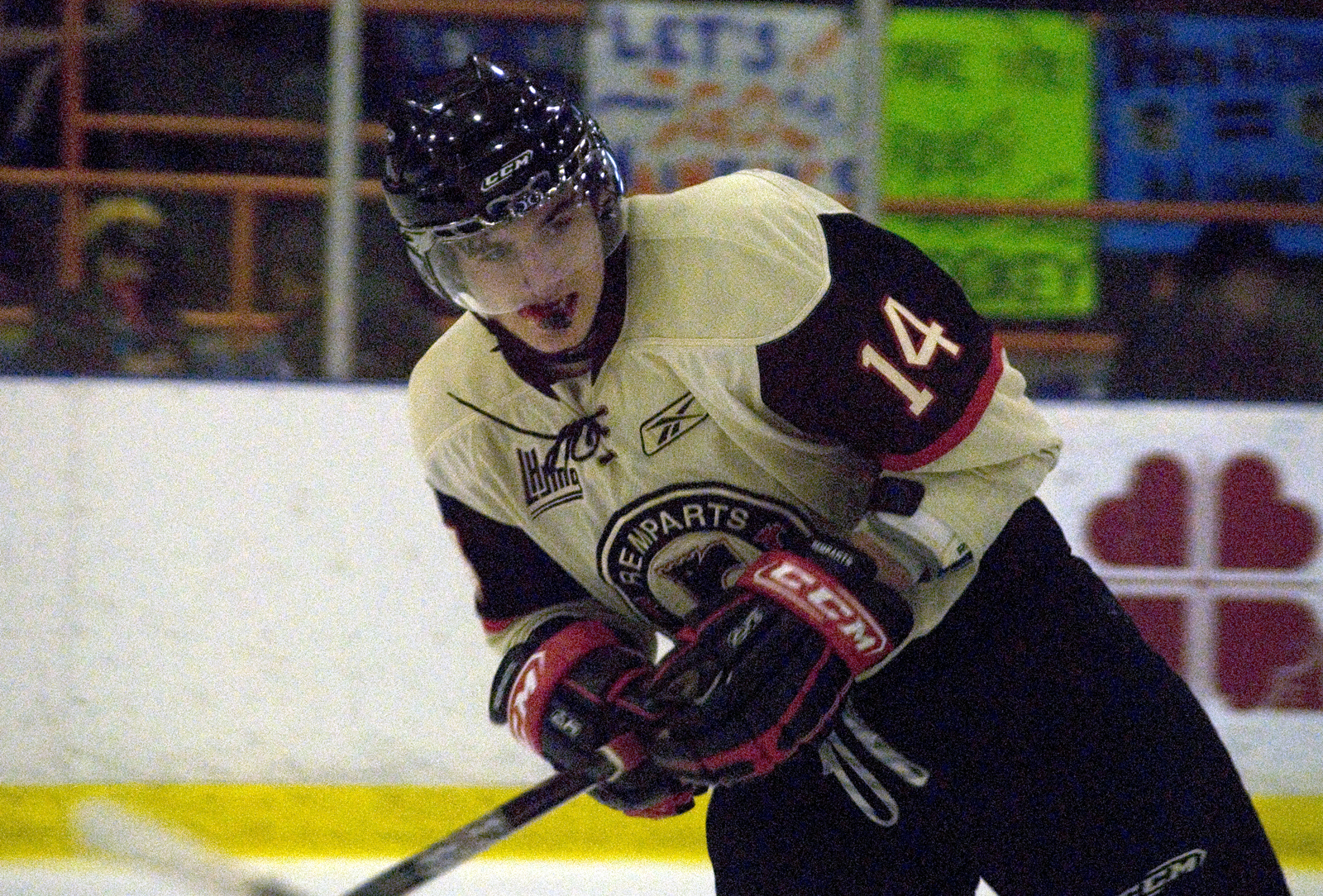
- Filippi with the Quebec Remparts in 2011
- Born: May 4, 1992 (age 33) Rychnov nad Kněžnou, Czech and Slovak Federative Republic
- Height: 6 ft 1 in (185 cm)
- Weight: 187 lb (85 kg; 13 st 5 lb)
- Position: Forward
- Shoots: Left
- ELH team Former teams: HC Bílí Tygři Liberec; Metallurg Magnitogorsk; Amur Khabarovsk
- National team: Czech Republic
- NHL draft: Undrafted
- Playing career: 2012–present

Tomáš Filippi (born May 4, 1992) is a Czech professional ice hockey player. He is currently playing with HC Bílí Tygři Liberec of the Czech Extraliga (ELH).

== Playing career ==
Filippi made his Czech Extraliga debut playing with HC Bílí Tygři Liberec during the 2012–13 Czech Extraliga season. After three seasons within the Czech Extraliga, Filippi left Liberec in signing a three-year contract with Russian club, Metallurg Magnitogorsk of the Kontinental Hockey League (KHL) on April 2, 2015.

== Career statistics ==
=== Regular season and playoffs ===
			Regular season					Playoffs
Season	Team	League	GP	G	A	Pts	PIM	GP	G	A	Pts	PIM
2010–11	Quebec Remparts	QMJHL	62	27	29	56	16	18	5	10	15	12
2011–12	Baie-Comeau Drakkar	QMJHL	60	19	34	53	48	8	1	8	9	8
2012–13	Bílí Tygři Liberec	ELH	51	10	15	25	20	—	—	—	—	—
2013–14	Bílí Tygři Liberec	ELH	38	11	10	21	18	3	0	0	0	4
2013–14	HC Benátky nad Jizerou	Czech.1	1	1	0	1	10	—	—	—	—	—
2014–15	Bílí Tygři Liberec	ELH	52	16	24	40	42	—	—	—	—	—
2015–16	Metallurg Magnitogorsk	KHL	60	10	20	30	30	23	5	4	9	10
2016–17	Metallurg Magnitogorsk	KHL	58	8	17	25	18	18	4	3	7	8
2017–18	Metallurg Magnitogorsk	KHL	25	6	11	17	10	—	—	—	—	—
2017–18	Bílí Tygři Liberec	ELH	4	0	3	3	4	10	3	5	8	34
2018–19	Amur Khabarovsk	KHL	10	2	2	4	2	—	—	—	—	—
2018–19	Bílí Tygři Liberec	ELH	31	10	15	25	34	17	7	3	10	10
2019–20	Bílí Tygři Liberec	ELH	24	8	11	19	6	—	—	—	—	—
2019–20	Metallurg Magnitogorsk	KHL	23	5	7	12	6	4	0	0	0	2
2020–21	Bílí Tygři Liberec	ELH	22	6	10	16	10	—	—	—	—	—
2021–22	Bílí Tygři Liberec	ELH	50	21	19	40	28	6	1	5	6	4
2022–23	Bílí Tygři Liberec	ELH	50	12	24	36	20	10	1	2	3	6
2023–24	Bílí Tygři Liberec	ELH	52	25	37	62	62	9	1	7	8	2
2024–25	Bílí Tygři Liberec	ELH	40	13	15	28	14	5	1	1	2	0
ELH totals			414	132	129	261	258	71	14	31	45	74
KHL totals			176	31	57	88	66	45	9	7	16	20

=== International ===
Year	Team	Event	Result	GP	G	A	Pts	PIM
2010	Czech Republic	WJC18	6th	6	1	1	2	4
2012	Czech Republic	WJC	5th	6	4	0	4	2
2016	Czech Republic	WC	5th	8	0	0	0	0
Junior totals				12	5	1	6	6
Senior totals				8	0	0	0	0

== Awards and honors ==
Award	Year
KHL
Gagarin Cup (Metallurg Magnitogorsk)	2016
