= Michaël Bournival =

Canadian ice hockey player (born 1992)

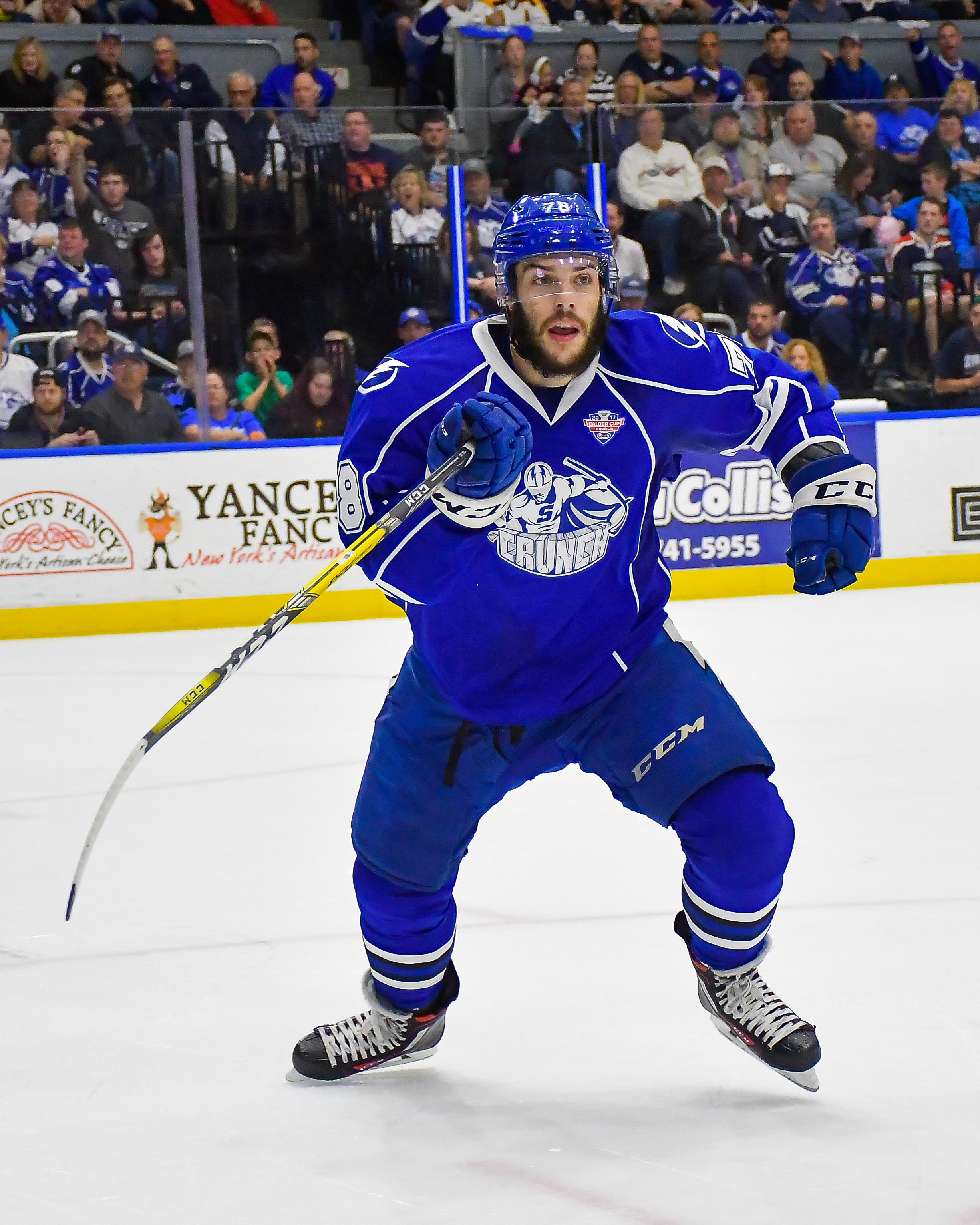
- Bournival with the Syracuse Crunch in 2017
- Born: May 31, 1992 (age 34) Shawinigan, Quebec, Canada
- Height: 5 ft 11 in (180 cm)
- Weight: 196 lb (89 kg; 14 st 0 lb)
- Position: Left wing
- Shot: Left
- Played for: Montreal Canadiens; Tampa Bay Lightning
- NHL draft: 71st overall, 2010; Colorado Avalanche
- Playing career: 2012–2019

Joseph Alain Michaël Bournival (born May 31, 1992) is a Canadian former professional ice hockey player. He was selected in the third round, 71st overall, by the Colorado Avalanche of the National Hockey League (NHL) in the 2010 NHL entry draft and played for the Montreal Canadiens and Tampa Bay Lightning.

== Playing career ==
As a youth, Bournival played in the 2005 Quebec International Pee-Wee Hockey Tournament with a minor ice hockey team from Mauricie.

Bournival was drafted 7th overall by the Shawinigan Cataractes in the 2008 QMJHL Entry Draft. After completing his second season with 62 points in 58 games, Bournival was selected by the Colorado Avalanche in the 3rd round (71st overall) of the 2010 NHL entry draft. On November 11, 2010, the Avalanche traded Bournival to the Montreal Canadiens in exchange for Ryan O'Byrne.

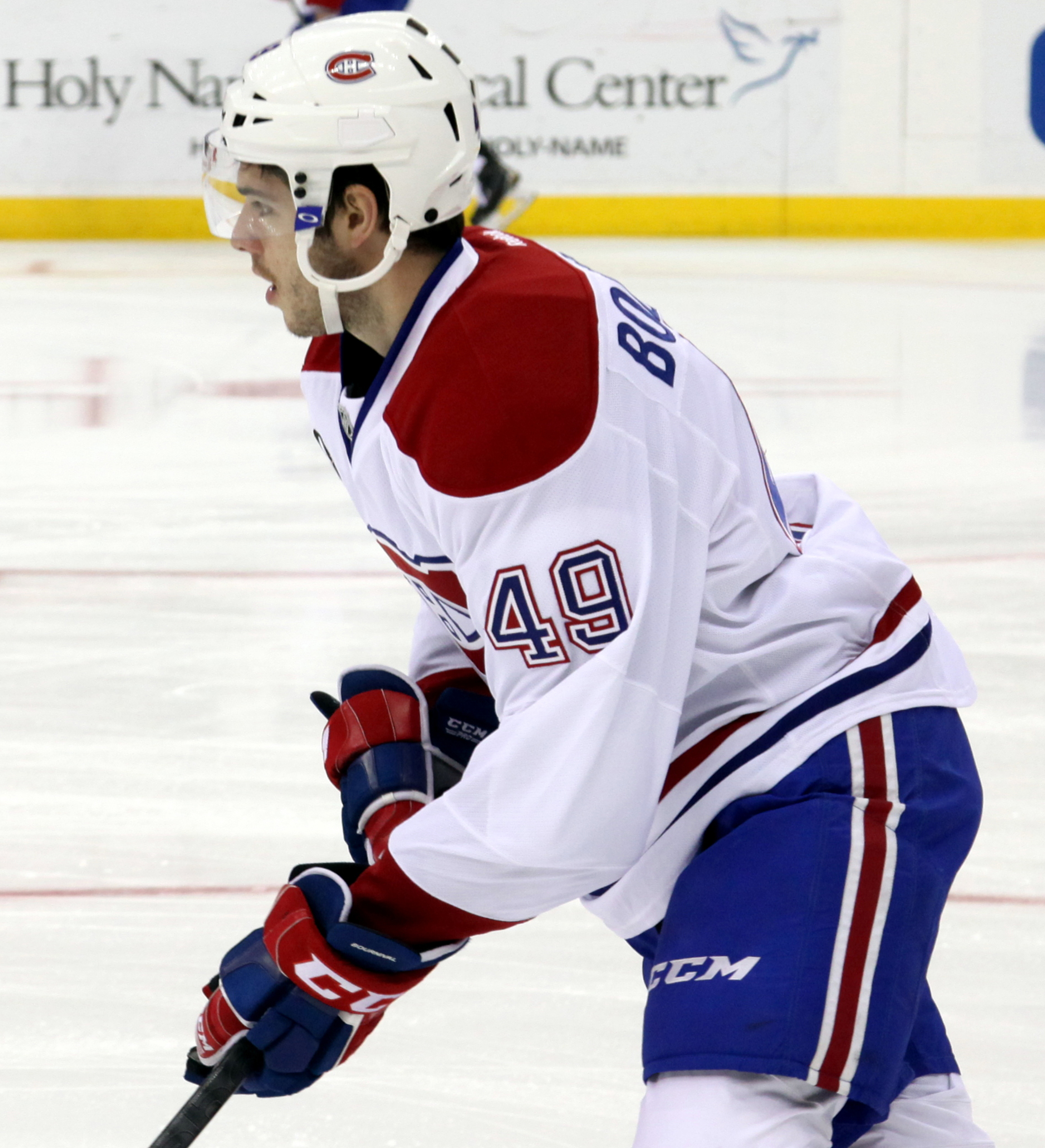
Bournival with the Montreal Canadiens in January 2015

During his final season in 2011–12 as captain with the Shawinigan Cataractes, Bournival was signed to a three-year entry-level contract with the Canadiens on December 21, 2011. In 2012, the Cataractes won their first Memorial Cup.

On October 17, 2013, Bournival scored his first NHL goal against the Columbus Blue Jackets in a 5-3 victory game at the Bell Centre in Montreal, Quebec.

At the conclusion of the 2015–16 season, having been unable to return to the NHL, Bournival was not tendered a qualifying offer by the Canadiens and was released to free agency. On July 1, 2016, Bournival was signed to a one-year, two-way contract with the Tampa Bay Lightning. On January 12, 2017, Bournival skated in his 100th career NHL game, which came in a 4-2 Lightning win over the Buffalo Sabres.

On July 14, 2017, Bournival signed a one-year, two-way contract extension with the Lightning. On April 19, 2018, Bournival signed a one-year extension with the Lightning.

On March 17, 2018, during a game against the Laval Rocket, Bournival tore his ACL. He required surgery, and missed the rest of the 2017–18 season. On April 19, 2018, Bournival signed a one-year extension with the Lightning. He had surgery soon after and missed the start of 2018–19 season.

Bournival returned to action on November 17, 2018, coincidentally against the Laval Rocket, eight months after his knee injury. Only thirteen days later, against the Cleveland Monsters, he sustained a shoulder injury which ended his season. He opted into surgery on his shoulder.

With injuries limiting Bournival to just 5 games with the Crunch and taking a toll on his health, Bournival opted to retire from professional hockey after 7 seasons on June 14, 2019.

== International play ==
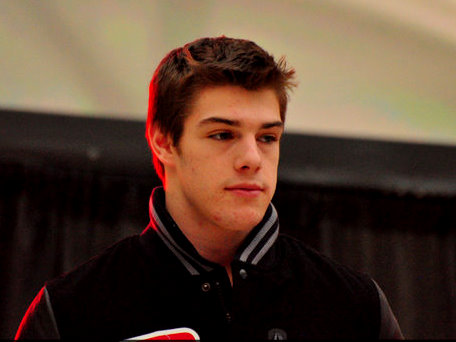

Medal record

Representing Canada

Ice hockey

World Junior Championships
Bronze medal – third place	2012 Canada	

Bournival was selected and participated at the 2012 World Junior Ice Hockey Championships, helping Canada claim the bronze medal.

== Career statistics ==
=== Regular season and playoffs ===
			Regular season					Playoffs
Season	Team	League	GP	G	A	Pts	PIM	GP	G	A	Pts	PIM
2008–09	Shawinigan Cataractes	QMJHL	46	11	11	22	29	21	1	3	4	12
2009–10	Shawinigan Cataractes	QMJHL	58	24	38	62	37	6	2	2	4	6
2010–11	Shawinigan Cataractes	QMJHL	56	28	36	64	28	12	5	8	13	10
2011–12	Shawinigan Cataractes	QMJHL	41	30	26	56	27	11	1	6	7	12
2012–13	Hamilton Bulldogs	AHL	69	10	20	30	26	—	—	—	—	—
2013–14	Montreal Canadiens	NHL	60	7	7	14	18	14	0	1	1	0
2013–14	Hamilton Bulldogs	AHL	3	2	1	3	2	—	—	—	—	—
2014–15	Hamilton Bulldogs	AHL	12	3	6	9	8	—	—	—	—	—
2014–15	Montreal Canadiens	NHL	29	3	2	5	4	—	—	—	—	—
2015–16	St. John's IceCaps	AHL	20	1	7	8	12	—	—	—	—	—
2016–17	Syracuse Crunch	AHL	38	9	10	19	18	22	8	7	15	14
2016–17	Tampa Bay Lightning	NHL	19	2	1	3	2	—	—	—	—	—
2017–18	Syracuse Crunch	AHL	57	15	19	34	55	—	—	—	—	—
2017–18	Tampa Bay Lightning	NHL	5	0	0	0	0	—	—	—	—	—
2018–19	Syracuse Crunch	AHL	5	1	2	3	2	—	—	—	—	—
NHL totals			113	12	10	22	24	14	0	1	1	0

=== International ===
Year	Team	Event	Result	GP	G	A	Pts	PIM
2009	Canada	WHC17	5th	5	2	3	5	6
2010	Canada	WJC18	7th	6	2	1	3	2
2012	Canada	WJC	3rd place, bronze medalist(s)	6	0	1	1	0
Junior totals				17	4	5	9	8
