= Philip-Michael Devos =

Canadian ice hockey player

Philip-Michaël Devos
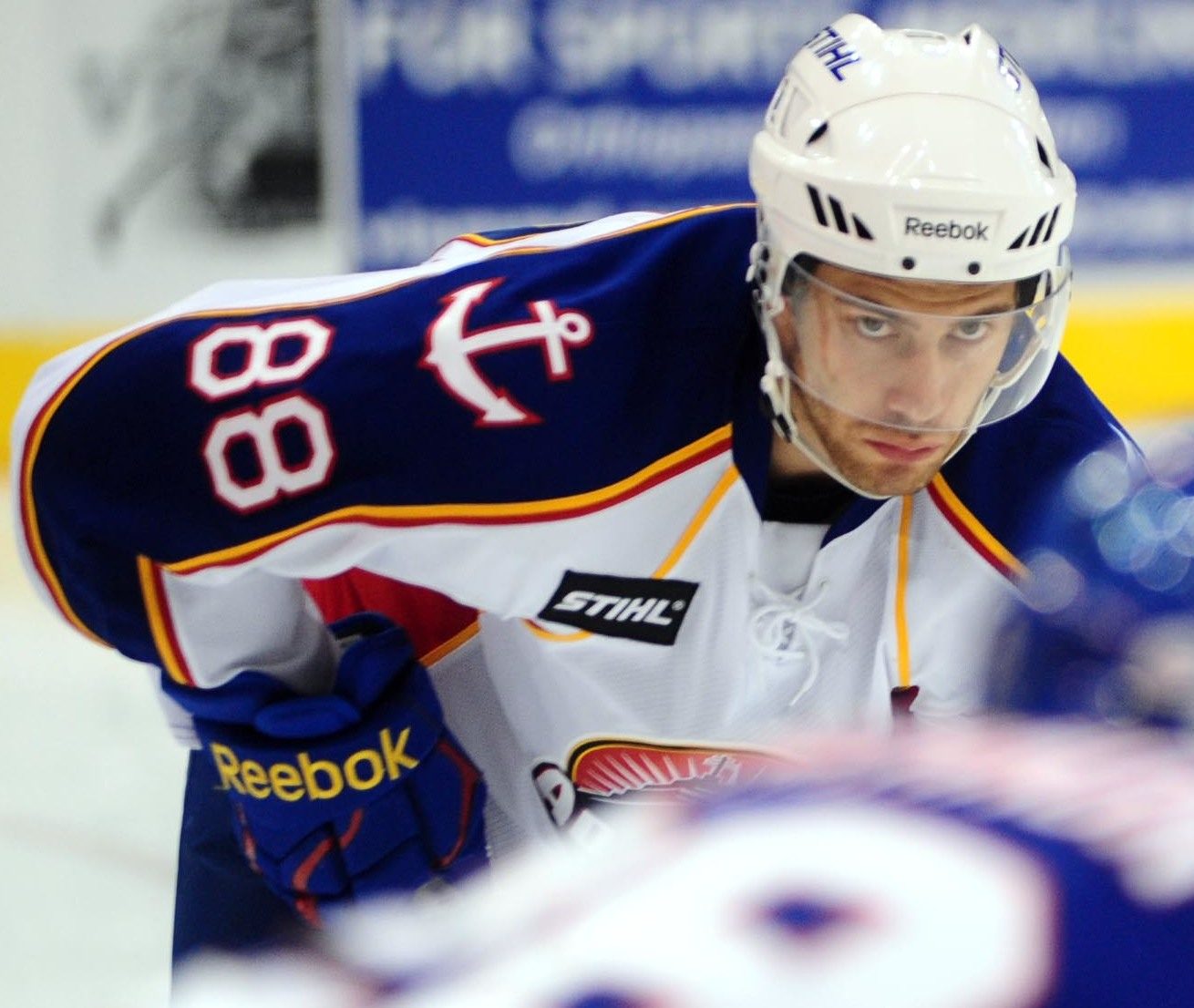
- Devos with the Norfolk Admirals in 2011
- Born: April 26, 1990 (age 35) Sorel-Tracy, Quebec, Canada
- Height: 5 ft 11 in (180 cm)
- Weight: 184 lb (83 kg; 13 st 2 lb)
- Position: Right wing
- Shoots: Left
- NL team Former teams: HC Ajoie; Val-Pustertal Wolves; Norfolk Admirals; Syracuse Crunch; Bridgeport Sound Tigers
- NHL draft: Undrafted
- Playing career: 2011–present

Philip-Michaël Devos (born April 26, 1990) is a Canadian professional ice hockey player currently playing for HC Ajoie of the National League (NL).

== Career ==
Devos played five seasons (2006 – 2011) of major junior hockey in the Quebec Major Junior Hockey League (QMJHL), registering 112 goals, 294 points, and 194 minutes penalty minutes in 325 games played.

On May 26, 2011, the Norfolk Admirals signed Devos on a two-year American Hockey League standard player's contract. He then joined AHL's Syracuse Crunch prior to the 2012–13 season. In October 2013, he was picked up by the Elmira Jackals of the ECHL and was traded to the Florida Everblades in January 2014.

On August 8, 2014, Devos began his European career by signing a one-year contract with Italian club, HC Pustertal Wölfe. Devos went on to finish the season as leading scorer in the Italian Serie A registering 31 goals and 72 assists in 49 games.

On March 23, 2015, Devos continued his European journey by signing a one-year contract with Swiss club, HC Ajoie of the second-tier Swiss League. Serving as an assistant captain, he helped Ajoie win the title in the SL, the second tier of Swiss ice hockey, tallying 17 goals and 68 assists in 63 games of the 2015–16 season which made him the SL leader in points and assists. He signed a new two-year deal with Ajoie in February 2016. On February 12, 2021, Devos agreed early to a 4-year contract extension with HC Ajoie through to the end of the 2024/25 season.

== Awards and honours ==
Award	Year
CHL Sportsman of the Year	2010–11
Jean Beliveau Trophy - QMJHL Top Scorer	2010–11
Frank J. Selke Memorial Trophy - QMJHL Most Sportsmanlike Player	2010–11
QMJHL Second All-Star Team	2010–11

== Career statistics ==
			Regular season					Playoffs
Season	Team	League	GP	G	A	Pts	PIM	GP	G	A	Pts	PIM
2006–07	Victoriaville Tigres	QMJHL	57	7	8	15	25	-	-	-	-	-
2007–08	Victoriaville Tigres	QMJHL	68	9	26	35	51	6	1	2	3	10
2008–09	Victoriaville Tigres	QMJHL	64	14	23	37	38	4	2	0	2	2
2009–10	Victoriaville Tigres	QMJHL	68	35	58	93	49	16	9	15	24	12
2010–11	Victoriaville Tigres	QMJHL	41	29	44	73	21	-	-	-	-	-
2010–11	Gatineau Olympiques	QMJHL	27	18	23	41	10	24	10	19	29	8
2011–12	Norfolk Admirals	AHL	52	7	17	24	28	9	1	1	2	8
2011–12	Florida Everblades	ECHL	22	6	14	20	12	-	-	-	-	-
2012–13	Syracuse Crunch	AHL	70	7	19	26	24	18	0	5	5	4
2013–14	Syracuse Crunch	AHL	9	1	1	2	0	-	-	-	-	-
2013–14	Bridgeport Sound Tigers	AHL	3	0	0	0	0	-	-	-	-	-
2013–14	Florida Everblades	ECHL	38	11	29	40	14	-	-	-	-	-
2013–14	Elmira Jackals	ECHL	18	1	8	9	8	-	-	-	-	-
2014–15	HC Pustertal Wölfe	Italy	38	30	60	90	57	11	1	12	13	6
2014–15	HC Pustertal Wölfe	Supercoppa Italiana	1	1	1	2	0	-	-	-	-	-
2014–15	HC Pustertal Wölfe	Coppa Italia	3	1	5	6	0	-	-	-	-	-
2015–16	HC Ajoie	NLB	45	19	52	71	24	18	8	16	24	6
2015–16	HC Ajoie	Swiss Cup	2	2	3	5	0	-	-	-	-	-
2016–17	HC Ajoie	NLB	48	40	57	97	12	10	5	15	20	26
2016–17	HC Ajoie	Swiss Cup	1	0	1	1	0	-	-	-	-	-
2017–18	HC Ajoie	SL	46	26	45	71	12	11	7	7	14	0
2017–18	Fribourg-Gottéron	NL	2	0	0	0	0	-	-	-	-	-
2017–18	HC Ajoie	Swiss Cup	4	1	3	4	0	-	-	-	-	-
2018–19	HC Ajoie	SL	44	19	56	75	16	7	3	5	8	4
2018–19	HC Ajoie	Swiss Cup	1	1	1	2	0	-	-	-	-	-
2019-20	HC Ajoie	SL	44	30	68	98	2	5	4	5	9	2
2019–20	HC Ajoie	Swiss Cup	5	4	12	16	6	-	-	-	-	-
2020–21	HC Ajoie	SL	46	27	52	79	20	16	11	17	28	4
2020–21	HC Ajoie	Swiss Cup	3	2	0	2	0	-	-	-	-	-
2021–22	HC Ajoie	NL	51	12	26	38	32	-	-	-	-	-
2022–23	HC Ajoie	NL	47	9	34	43	10	-	-	-	-	-
2022–23	HC Ajoie	NL Qualification	6	0	2	2	0	2	0	1	1	0
2022	Team Canada	Spengler Cup	1	0	0	0	0	-	-	-	-	-
2023–24	HC Ajoie	NL	37	4	9	13	6	-	-	-	-	-
QMJHL totals			325	112	182	294	194	50	22	36	58	32
AHL totals			134	15	37	52	52	27	1	6	7	12
ECHL totals			78	18	51	69	34	-	-	-	-	-
Italy totals			38	30	60	90	57	11	1	12	13	6
SL totals			273	161	330	491	86	67	38	65	103	42
NL totals			135	25	69	94	48	-	-	-	-	-
