= David Honzík =

Czech ice hockey goaltender

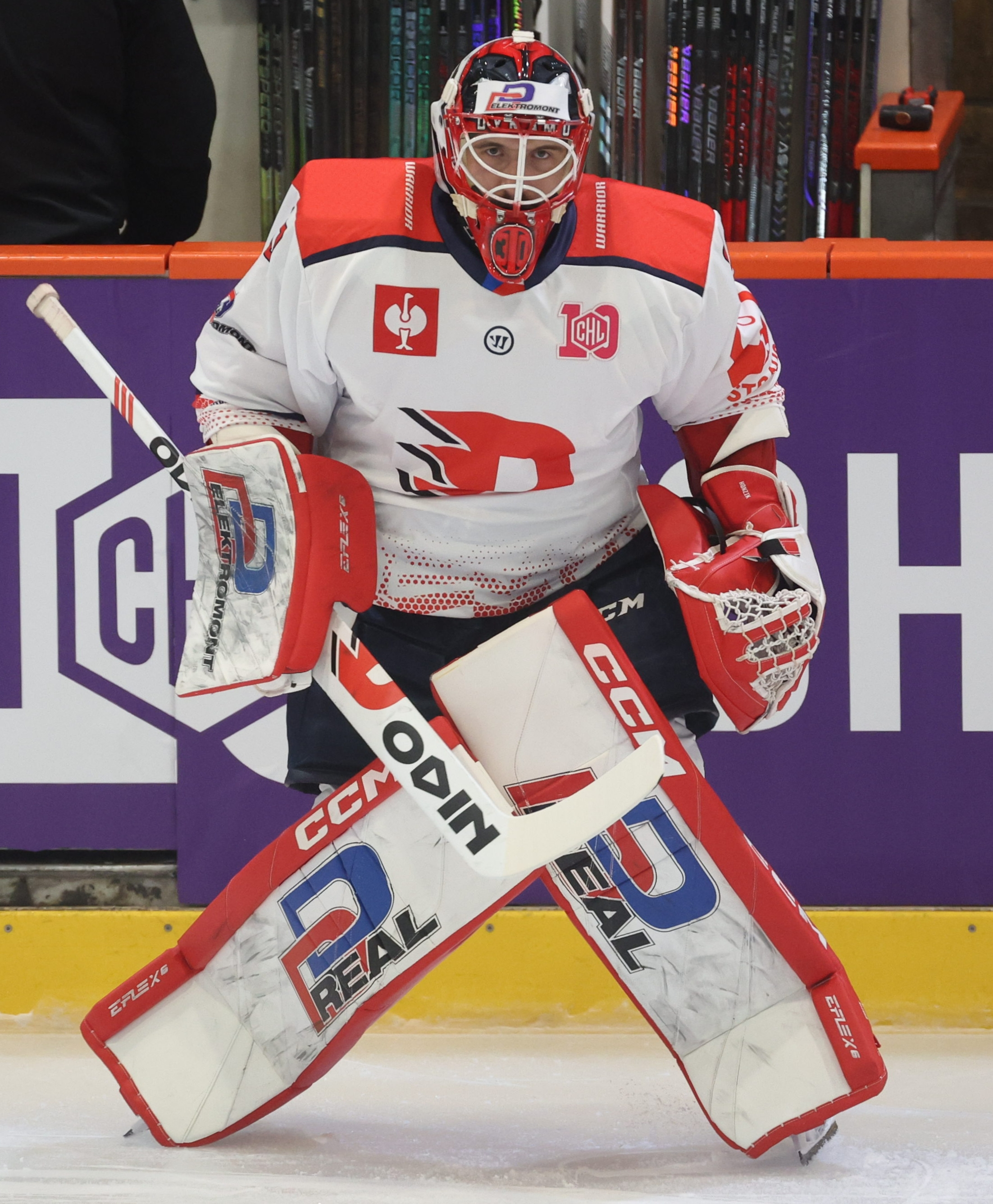
- David Honzík, 2024
- Born: 9 August 1993 (age 32) Milevsko, Czech Republic
- Height: 6 ft 2 in (188 cm)
- Weight: 214 lb (97 kg; 15 st 4 lb)
- Position: Goaltender
- Catches: Left
- Czech 1.liga team Former teams: HC Dynamo Pardubice B HC Karlovy Vary; Victoriaville Tigres; Cape Breton Screaming Eagles; HC Baník Sokolov; HC Dukla Jihlava; HC Sparta Praha; HC Slavia Praha; HC Litvínov; HC Frýdek-Místek; HK Nitra; PSG Berani Zlín; HK Dukla Trenčín
- NHL draft: 71st overall, 2011; Vancouver Canucks
- Playing career: 2014–present

David Honzík (born 9 August 1993) is a Czech professional ice hockey goaltender who currently playing for HC Dynamo Pardubice B of the Czech 1.liga.

== Career ==
Honzík began playing for HC Karlovy Vary's academy team at U18 and U20 level before he was drafted 33rd overall by the Victoriaville Tigres of the Quebec Major Junior Hockey League in the 2010 CHL Import Draft. In his first season in the QMJHL, Honzík participated in the CHL Top Prospects Game. He was then drafted 71st overall by the Vancouver Canucks in the 2011 NHL entry draft but never signed with the Canucks and instead spent two more seasons in the QMJHL with the Tigres and later the Cape Breton Screaming Eagles before returning to Karlovy Vary.

Honzík made his Czech Extraliga debut for Karlovy Vary during the 2015 Relegation Round. He then had a loan spell with HC Dukla Jihlava before returning to the Karlovy Vary lineup for the 2016–17 Czech Extraliga season. On May 11, 2017, Honzík signed for HC Sparta Praha. He had two separate loan spells with HC Slavia Praha before returning to Dukla Jihlava on a permanent deal on January 16, 2019. On May 9, 2019, Honzík signed a contract with HC Litvínov.

== Career statistics ==
=== Regular season and playoffs ===
			Regular season										Playoffs
Season	Team	League	GP	W	L	T	OTL	MIN	GA	SO	GAA	SV%	GP	W	L	MIN	GA	SO	GAA	SV%
