= Igor Levitsky =

Russian ice hockey player

- Born: April 8, 1993 (age 31); Moscow, Russia
- Height: 6 ft 0 in (183 cm)
- Weight: 183 lb (83 kg; 13 st 1 lb)
- Position: Forward
- Shoots: Right
- VHL team Former teams: Zvezda Moscow; Torpedo Oskemen; CSKA Moscow; Sibir Novosibirsk; HC Sochi; Spartak Moscow; Atlant Mytishchi
- NHL draft: Undrafted
- Playing career: 2012–present

Igor Aleksandrovich Levitsky (Russian: Игорь Александрович Левицкий; born 8 April 1993) is a Russian ice hockey player. He is currently playing with Zvezda Moscow of the Supreme Hockey League (VHL). He has previously played in the Kontinental Hockey League (KHL) between 2013 and 2019.

Levitsky made his KHL debut with Atlant Moscow Oblast during the 2013–14 KHL season.
