= Mirko Höfflin =

German ice hockey player (born 1992)

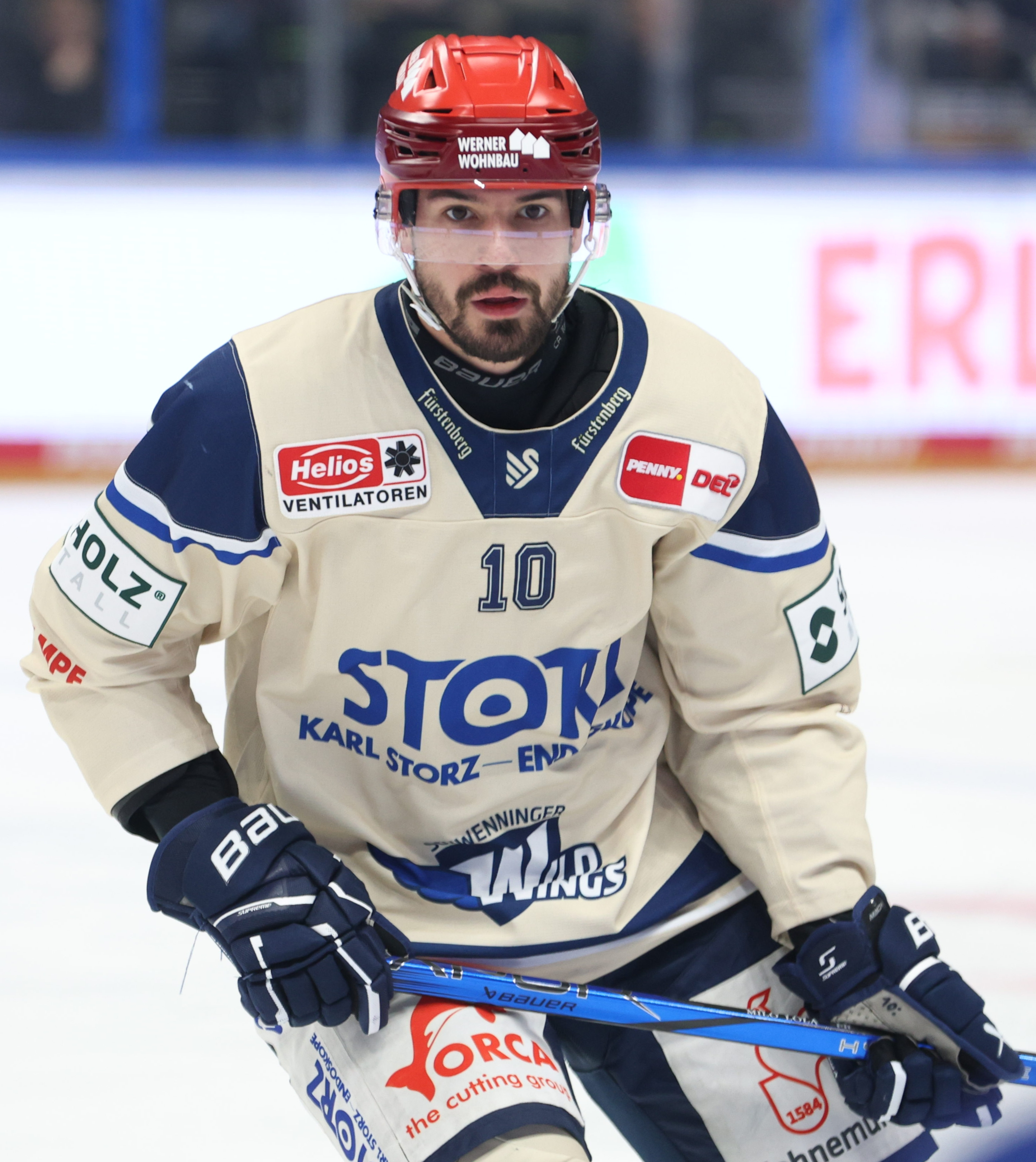
- Born: June 18, 1992 (age 33) Freiburg, Germany
- Height: 6 ft 0 in (183 cm)
- Weight: 174 lb (79 kg; 12 st 6 lb)
- Position: Forward
- Shoots: Left
- DEL team Former teams: Schwenninger Wild Wings; Adler Mannheim; Straubing Tigers; ERC Ingolstadt
- National team: Germany
- NHL draft: 151st overall, 2010; Chicago Blackhawks
- Playing career: 2010–present

Mirko Höfflin (born June 18, 1992) is a German professional ice hockey forward who is currently playing for Schwenninger Wild Wings in the Deutsche Eishockey Liga (DEL). He was selected by the Chicago Blackhawks in the sixth round (151st overall) of the 2010 NHL entry draft.

== Playing career ==
Höfflin played major junior hockey for the Acadie–Bathurst Titan in the QMJHL.

On May 16, 2012, he was signed to a two-year contract to return to his original youth club, Adler Mannheim.

After winning the German Championship in the 2014–15 season with Mannheim, Höfflin was signed to an extension; however was to be loaned for the following season to DEL competitors the Straubing Tigers on June 23, 2015.

On March 23, 2017, Höfflin agreed to leave Mannheim at the conclusion of the 2016–17 season, to sign a two-year deal with the Schwenninger Wild Wings.

Following his second season with the Wild Wings, unable to help Schwenninger qualify for the playoffs in 2018–19, Höfflin left the club out of contract and signed a one-year deal with his fourth DEL club, ERC Ingolstadt, on March 10, 2019.

== International play ==
Höfflin represented Germany at the 2018 IIHF World Championship.

== Awards and honours ==
Award	Year
DNL Leading Goal Scorer (32)	2009–10
