= 2009–10 QMJHL season =

- League: Quebec Major Junior Hockey League
- Sport: Hockey
- Duration: Regular season September 10, 2009 – March 14, 2010; Playoffs; March 18 – May 10, 2010
- Teams: 18

Draft
- Top draft pick: Olivier Archambault
- Picked by: Val-d'Or Foreurs

Regular season
- Jean Rougeau Trophy: Saint John Sea Dogs (1)
- Season MVP: Mike Hoffman (Saint John Sea Dogs)
- Top scorer: Sean Couturier (Drummondville Voltigeurs)

Playoffs
- Playoffs MVP: Gabriel Bourque (Wildcats)
- Finals champions: Moncton Wildcats (2)
- Runners-up: Saint John Sea Dogs

QMJHL seasons
- 2008–09 2010–11

2009–10 CHL season
- League: Canadian Hockey League
- Sport: Hockey
- Duration: OHL; Sept. 17, 2009 – Mar. 14, 2010; QMJHL; Sept. 10, 2009 – Mar. 14, 2010; WHL; Sept. 17, 2009 – Mar. 14, 2010
- Teams: 60
- Season MVP: Jordan Eberle (Regina Pats) (WHL)
- Top scorer: Brandon Kozun (Calgary Hitmen) (WHL)

Memorial Cup
- Finals champions: Windsor Spitfires (OHL) (2nd title)
- Runners-up: Brandon Wheat Kings (WHL)

The 2009–10 QMJHL season was the 41st season of the Quebec Major Junior Hockey League (QMJHL). The regular season, which consisted of eighteen teams playing 68 games each, began on September 10, 2009, and ended on March 14, 2010.

The 2009–10 QMJHL season marked the first time that an all-Maritime Provinces Championship series occurred in the 41-year history of the league.

== Standings ==
=== Division standings ===
Note: GP = Games played; W = Wins; L = Losses; OTL = Overtime losses; SL - Shootout losses; GF = Goals for; GA = Goals against; Pts = Points

Division Atlantique	GP	W	L	OTL	SL	GF	GA	Pts
Saint John Sea Dogs R	68	53	12	1	2	309	187	109
Moncton Wildcats X	68	48	14	2	4	276	164	102
Cape Breton Screaming Eagles X	68	41	22	2	3	238	185	87
P.E.I. Rocket X	68	35	25	2	6	215	224	78
Acadie-Bathurst Titan X	68	25	37	3	3	208	286	56
Halifax Mooseheads O	68	13	48	3	4	171	288	33

Division Telus Centre	GP	W	L	OTL	SL	GF	GA	Pts
Drummondville Voltigeurs Z	68	51	15	0	2	307	185	104
Victoriaville Tigres X	68	46	19	1	2	296	191	95
Shawinigan Cataractes X	68	31	29	3	5	217	240	70
Lewiston MAINEiacs X	68	23	42	0	3	212	298	49

Division Telus Est	GP	W	L	OTL	SL	GF	GA	Pts
Québec Remparts Z	68	41	20	3	4	278	232	89
Rimouski Océanic X	68	34	27	5	2	246	265	75
Chicoutimi Saguenéens X	68	26	33	4	5	186	257	61
Baie-Comeau Drakkar O	68	21	40	4	3	187	297	49

Division Telus Ouest	GP	W	L	OTL	SL	GF	GA	Pts
Rouyn-Noranda Huskies Z	68	41	21	2	4	256	205	88
Montreal Junior Hockey Club X	68	31	30	2	5	215	215	69
Gatineau Olympiques X	68	30	33	1	4	213	217	65
Val-d'Or Foreurs X	68	22	38	6	2	202	296	52

=== Overall standings ===
- determines standings for the second round of the playoffs.

Note: GP = Games played; W = Wins; L = Losses; OTL = Overtime losses; SL - Shootout losses; GF = Goals for; GA = Goals against; Pts = Points

Rank	Team	GP	W	L	OTL	SL	GF	GA	Pts
1	Saint John Sea Dogs R	68	53	12	1	2	309	187	109
2	Drummondville Voltigeurs Z	68	51	15	0	2	307	185	104
3	Québec Remparts Z	68	41	20	3	4	278	232	89
4	Rouyn-Noranda Huskies Z	68	41	21	2	4	256	205	88
5	Moncton Wildcats X	68	48	14	2	4	276	164	102
6	Victoriaville Tigres X	68	46	19	1	2	296	191	95
7	Cape Breton Screaming Eagles X	68	41	22	2	3	238	185	87
8	P.E.I. Rocket X	68	35	25	2	6	215	224	78
9	Rimouski Océanic X	68	34	27	5	2	246	265	75
10	Shawinigan Cataractes X	68	31	29	3	5	217	240	70
11	Montreal Junior Hockey Club X	68	31	30	2	5	215	215	69
12	Gatineau Olympiques X	68	30	33	1	4	213	217	65
13	Chicoutimi Saguenéens X	68	26	33	4	5	186	257	61
14	Acadie-Bathurst Titan X	68	25	37	3	3	208	286	56
15	Val-d'Or Foreurs X	68	22	38	6	2	202	296	52
16	Lewiston MAINEiacs X	68	23	42	0	3	212	298	49
17	Baie-Comeau Drakkar O	68	21	40	4	3	187	297	49
18	Halifax Mooseheads O	68	13	48	3	4	171	288	33

R - Regular Season Champions

Z - team has clinched division

X - team clinched QMJHL Playoff spot

O - team DID NOT make Playoffs

=== Scoring leaders ===
Note: GP = Games played; G = Goals; A = Assists; Pts = Points; PIM = Penalty minutes

Player	Team	GP	G	A	Pts	PIM
Sean Couturier	Drummondville Voltigeurs	68	41	55	96	47
Nicolas Deschamps	Chicoutimi Saguenéens/Moncton Wildcats	64	39	57	96	40
Gabriel Dumont	Drummondville Voltigeurs	62	51	42	93	127
Philip-Michael Devos	Victoriaville Tigres	68	35	58	93	49
Luke Adam	Cape Breton Screaming Eagles	56	49	41	90	75
Dmitri Kugryshev	Quebec Remparts	66	29	58	87	52
Mike Hoffman	Saint John Sea Dogs	56	46	39	85	38
Félix Lefrançois	Rimouski Océanic	66	39	44	83	69
Michael Kirkpatrick	Saint John Sea Dogs	67	29	54	83	38
Gabriel Lévesque	Rouyn-Noranda Huskies	67	24	58	82	16

=== Leading goaltenders ===
Note: GP = Games played; TOI = Total ice time; W = Wins; L = Losses; GA = Goals against; SO = Total shutouts; SV% = Save percentage; GAA = Goals against average

Player	Team	GP	TOI	W	L	GA	SO	SV%	GAA
Jake Allen	Montreal/Drummondville	45	2512:19	29	14	92	4	.922	2.20
Marc-Antoine Gélinas	Saint John/Shawinigan	47	2565:49	30	15	111	4	.915	2.60
Olivier Roy	Cape Breton Screaming Eagles	54	3155:55	32	21	113	5	.908	2.62
Kevin Poulin	Victoriaville Tigres	54	3105:03	35	16	136	7	.916	2.63
Louis Domingue	Moncton/Quebec	41	2212:54	20	17	99	3	.906	2.68

== Players ==
=== 2009 QMJHL Entry Draft ===
First round

1. Val-d'Or Foreurs Olivier Archambault (LW)

=== 2009 NHL entry draft ===
In total, 21 QMJHL players were selected at the 2009 NHL entry draft.

2009 NHL Entry Draft (QMJHL draftees)

1st round
#	Nat.	Player	QMJHL team	NHL team
14	(Russia)	Dmitri Kulikov	Drummondville Voltigeurs	Florida Panthers
25	(Canada)	Jordan Caron	Rimouski Océanic	Boston Bruins
27	(Canada)	Philippe Paradis	Shawinigan Cataractes	Carolina Hurricanes
30	(Canada)	Simon Després	Saint John Sea Dogs	Pittsburgh Penguins

2nd round
#	Nat.	Player	QMJHL team	NHL team
42	(Canada)	Charles-Olivier Roussel	Shawinigan Cataractes	Nashville Predators
54	(Canada)	Éric Gélinas	Lewiston MAINEiacs	New Jersey Devils

3rd round
#	Nat.	Player	QMJHL team	NHL team
75	(Czech Republic)	Andrej Nestrasil	Victoriaville Tigres	Detroit Red Wings
84	(Canada)	Nicolas Deslauriers	Rouyn-Noranda Huskies	Los Angeles Kings
90	(Canada)	Gleason Fournier	Rimouski Océanic	Detroit Red Wings

4th round
#	Nat.	Player	QMJHL team	NHL team
94	(Canada)	David Savard	Moncton Wildcats	Columbus Blue Jackets
95	(Canada)	Jean-François Bérubé	Montreal Junior Hockey Club	Los Angeles Kings
121	(Canada)	Nick Petersen	Shawinigan Cataractes	Pittsburgh Penguins

5th round
#	Nat.	Player	QMJHL team	NHL team
130	(Canada)	Mike Hoffman	Drummondville Voltigeurs	Ottawa Senators
132	(Canada)	Gabriel Bourque	Baie-Comeau Drakkar	Nashville Predators
133	(Canada)	Olivier Roy	Cape Breton Screaming Eagles	Edmonton Oilers
139	(Canada)	Gabriel Dumont	Drummondville Voltigeurs	Montreal Canadiens
142	(Canada)	Nicola Riopel	Moncton Wildcats	Philadelphia Flyers

6th round
#	Nat.	Player	QMJHL team	NHL team
153	(Canada)	Dave Labrecque	Shawinigan Cataractes	Philadelphia Flyers
174	(Canada)	Ashton Bernard	Shawinigan Cataractes	New Jersey Devils

7th round
#	Nat.	Player	QMJHL team	NHL team
187	(Canada)	Steven Anthony	Saint John Sea Dogs	Vancouver Canucks
194	(Canada)	Maxime Legault	Shawinigan Cataractes	Buffalo Sabres
205	(Canada)	Benjamin Casavant	P.E.I. Rocket	Washington Capitals
209	(Canada)	David Gilbert	Quebec Remparts	Chicago Blackhawks

== Subway Super Series ==
The Subway Super Series (formerly known as ADT Canada Russia Challenge) is a six-game series featuring four teams: three from the Canadian Hockey League (CHL) versus Russia's National Junior hockey team. Within the Canadian Hockey League umbrella, one team from each of its three leagues — the Ontario Hockey League, Quebec Major Junior Hockey League, and Western Hockey League — compete in two games against the Russian junior team.

The 2009 Subway Super Series was held in six cities across Canada, with two cities for each league within the Canadian Hockey League. The series begun on November 16, 2009, and concluded on November 26, 2009. Both Quebec Major Junior Hockey League games were held in the province of Quebec. Former Montreal Canadiens players, Guy Carbonneau and Guy Lafleur were named Honorary Captains for the first two games of the series, which was held in Drummondville on November 16, 2009, and Shawinigan on November 18, 2009.

All six games were televised nationwide on Rogers Sportsnet, which broadcast both games from the Quebec Major Junior Hockey League.

=== Results ===
In the first game of the two part series between Team QMJHL and Team Russia, Team QMJHL scored three goals en route to a 3–1 win in front of 2,234 fans at Centre Marcel Dionne in Drummondville, Quebec. Goaltender Alexander Zalivin of Team Russia and forward Gabriel Bourque of Team QMJHL were named Players of the Game for their respective teams. Two nights later at Centre Bionest in Shawinigan, Quebec, Team QMJHL defeated Team Russia 8–3 to give the CHL a 2–0 series lead. Denis Golubev was named Team Russia's Player of the Game, while Luke Adam was named Team QMJHL's Player of the Game.

Date	Location	Winner	Loser
November 16	Drummondville, Quebec	QMJHL all-stars 3	1 Team Russia
November 18	Shawinigan, Quebec	QMJHL all-stars 8	3 Team Russia
November 19	Barrie, Ontario	OHL all-stars 5	2 Team Russia
November 23	Windsor, Ontario	OHL all-stars 5	2 Team Russia
November 25	Victoria, British Columbia	WHL all-stars 2	1 Team Russia
November 26	Kelowna, British Columbia	WHL all-stars 4	2 Team Russia
CHL wins series 6-0

== QMJHL Playoffs ==
=== Overview ===
First Round
1A	Saint John	4
4A	P.E.I.	1
2O	Montreal	3
3O	Gatineau	4
1E	Quebec	4
5A	Acadie-Bathurst	1
2C	Victoriaville	4
3C	Shawinigan	2
1C	Drummondville	4
4C	Lewiston	0
2E	Rimouski	4
3E	Chicoutimi	3
1O	Rouyn-Noranda	4
4O	Val-d'Or	2
2A	Moncton	4
3A	Cape Breton	1

Quarter-finals
1	Saint John	4
12	Gatineau	0
3	Quebec	0
6	Victoriaville	4
2	Drummondville	4
9	Rimouski	1
4	Rouyn-Noranda	1
5	Moncton	4

Semi-finals
1	Saint John	4
6	Victoriaville	2
2	Drummondville	1
5	Moncton	4

QMJHL Championships
1	Saint John	2
5	Moncton	4

== First round ==
=== Division Atlantique ===
==== (1A) Saint John Sea Dogs vs. (4A) P.E.I. Rocket ====
March 19	Saint John Sea Dogs	8 – 3	P.E.I. Rocket	Harbour Station	Recap
4:13 - pp - Mike Hoffman (1); 15:06 - Jonathan Huberdeau (1); 16:15 - Stanislav Galiev (1); 16:58 - sh - Nicholas Pard (1)		First period	No scoring
11:06 - Nathan Beaulieu (1); 17:52 - Tomáš Jurčo (1)		Second period	Louis-Philippe Lacroix (1) - 14:26; Michael Stinziani (1) - pp - 17:26
0:59 - pp - Mike Kirkpatrick (1); 17:13 - pp - Pierre Durepos (1)		Third period	Jimmy Oligny (1) - pp - 17:54
Marco Cousineau (28 saves / 31 shots)		Goalie stats	Evan Mosher (25 saves / 31 shots); Wendell Vye (8 saves / 10 shots)

March 20	Saint John Sea Dogs	3 – 6	P.E.I. Rocket	Harbour Station	Recap
No scoring		First period	No scoring
4:56 - pp - Zack Phillips (1)		Second period	Jarrad Struthers (1) - pp - 14:26; Benjamin Casavant (1) - 15:09; Jonathan Bonneau (1) - 18:19
15:34 - pp - Nick Petersen (1); 17:40 - pp - Mike Hoffman (2)		Third period	Jarrad Struthers (2) - 11:27; Benjamin Casavant (2) - 11:43; Louis-Philippe Lacroix (2) - sh - en - 18:51
Marco Cousineau (30 saves / 35 shots); Karel St-Laurent (0 saves / 0 shots)		Goalie stats	Evan Mosher (41 saves / 44 shots)

March 23	P.E.I. Rocket	0 – 3	Saint John Sea Dogs	Charlottetown Civic Centre	Recap
No scoring		First period	Jonathan Huberdeau (2) - 14:33
No scoring		Second period	Danick Gauthier (1) - 2:21; Mike Hoffman (3) - 19:53
No scoring		Third period	No scoring
Evan Mosher (27 saves / 30 shots)		Goalie stats	Marco Cousineau (24 saves / 24 shots)

March 24	P.E.I. Rocket	1 – 2	OT	Saint John Sea Dogs	Charlottetown Civic Centre	Recap
12:00 - pp - Jean-Philippe Mathieu (1)		First period		No scoring
No scoring		Second period		No scoring
No scoring		Third period		Nick Petersen (2) - 17:41
No scoring		First overtime period		Tomáš Jurčo (2) - 3:55
Evan Mosher (28 saves / 30 shots)		Goalie stats		Marco Cousineau (22 saves / 23 shots)

March 26	Saint John Sea Dogs	7 – 2	P.E.I. Rocket	Harbour Station	Recap
3:37 - Jonathan Huberdeau (3); 16:55 - Stanislav Galiev (2)		First period	No scoring
13:59 - Jonathan Huberdeau (4); 14:52 - Mike Thomas (1)		Second period	Benjamin Casavant (3) - 7:06
14:05 - Danick Gauthier (2); 15:35 - Jonathan Huberdeau (5); 18:07 - pp - Mike Thomas (2)		Third period	Jonathan Bonneau (2) - pp - 15:17
Marco Cousineau (27 saves / 29 shots)		Goalie stats	Evan Mosher (34 saves / 41 shots)

Saint John won series 4 – 1

==== (2A) Moncton Wildcats vs. (3A) Cape Breton Screaming Eagles ====
March 19	Moncton Wildcats	6 – 3	Cape Breton Screaming Eagles	Moncton Coliseum	Recap
No scoring		First period	Taylor MacDougall - pp - 19:20
1:05 - Kelsey Tessier (1); 13:24 - pp - Randy Cameron (1)		Second period	Nick MacNeil (1) - pp - 4:52; Morgan Ellis (1) - 9:34
4:10 - Kelsey Tessier (2); 9:22 - Kelsey Tessier (3); 12:50 - pp - Daniel Pettersson (1); 13:24 - Randy Cameron (2)		Third period	No scoring
Nicola Riopel (31 saves / 34 shots); Shane Owen (0 saves / 0 shots)		Goalie stats	Olivier Roy (38 saves / 44 shots)

March 20	Moncton Wildcats	6 – 0	Cape Breton Screaming Eagles	Moncton Coliseum	Recap
12:23 - pp - Marek Hrivík (1)		First period	No scoring
1:18 - Randy Cameron (3); 3:50 - Gabriel Bourque (1); 6:13 - Randy Cameron (4)		Second period	No scoring
18:24 - pp - Mark Barberio (1); 19:48 - pp - Marek Hrivík (2)		Third period	No scoring
Nicola Riopel (26 saves / 26 shots)		Goalie stats	Olivier Roy (21 saves / 27 shots)

March 23	Cape Breton Screaming Eagles	2 – 3	OT	Moncton Wildcats	Centre 200	Recap
No scoring		First period		No scoring
No scoring		Second period		Nicolas Deschamps (1) - 19:20
13:37 - pp - Maxime Legault (1); 17:39 - Viktor Hertzberg (1)		Third period		Nicolas Deschamps (2) - 6:34
No scoring		First overtime period		David Savard (1) - 14:53
Olivier Roy (29 saves / 32 shots)		Goalie stats		Nicola Riopel (46 saves / 48 shots)

March 24	Cape Breton Screaming Eagles	4 – 1	Moncton Wildcats	Centre 200	Recap
No scoring		First period	No scoring
14:37 - pp - Luke Adam (1); 15:48 - pp - Taylor MacDougall (2)		Second period	No scoring
3:38 - pp - Luke Adam (2); 6:36 - pp - Luke Adam (3)		Third period	16:05 - pp - Alex Saulnier (1)
Olivier Roy (26 saves / 27 shots)		Goalie stats	Nicola Riopel (15 saves / 19 shots); Shane Owen (3 saves / 3 shots)

March 27	Moncton Wildcats	4 – 0	Cape Breton Screaming Eagles	Moncton Coliseum	Recap
5:22 - Nicolas Deschamps (3)		First period	No scoring
0:41 - Kelsey Tessier (4); 14:50 - pp - Gabriel Bourque (2)		Second period	No scoring
19:13 - en - Devon MacAusland (1)		Third period	No scoring
Nicola Riopel (30 saves / 30 shots)		Goalie stats	Olivier Roy (22 saves / 25 shots)

Moncton won series 4 – 1

=== Division Telus Centre ===
==== (1C) Drummondville Voltigeurs vs. (4C) Lewiston Maineiacs ====
March 19	Drummondville Voltigeurs	7 – 2	Lewiston Maineiacs	Centre Marcel Dionne	Recap
10:46 - Marc-Olivier Vachon (1)		First period	No scoring
0:59 - Sean Couturier (1); 9:49 - Christopher DiDomenico (1); 18:52 - Philippe Lefebvre (1)		Second period	Samuel Carrier (1) - pp - 9:32
2:58 - pp - Marc-Antoine Desnoyers (1); 7:52 - Gabriel Dumont (1); 10:58 - Marc-Olivier Vachon (2)		Third period	Michal Hlinka (1) - 1:27
Jake Allen (15 saves / 17 shots)		Goalie stats	Adrien Lemay (44 saves / 51 shots)

March 20	Drummondville Voltigeurs	5 – 1	Lewiston Maineiacs	Centre Marcel Dionne	Recap
0:34 - Gabriel Dumont (2); 2:34 - sh - Sean Couturier (2); 7:53 - Jonathan Brunelle (1); 19:16 - Christopher DiDomenico (2)		First period	No scoring
No scoring		Second period	No scoring
3:02 - Gabriel Dumont (3)		Third period	Stefan Fournier (1) - pp - 2:47
Jake Allen (18 saves / 19 shots)		Goalie stats	Adrien Lemay (32 saves / 37 shots)

March 23	Lewiston Maineiacs	1 – 5	Drummondville Voltigeurs	Androscoggin Bank Colisée	Recap
No scoring		First period	No scoring
15:52 - Zachary Evans-Renaud (1)		Second period	Benoît Lévesque (1) - 5:21; Gabriel Dumont (4) - 19:48
No scoring		Third period	Jonathan Brunelle (2) - 2:00; Andrew Randazzo (1) - 15:14; Marc-Olivier Vachon (3) - 17:48
Adrien Lemay (33 saves / 38 shots)		Goalie stats	Jake Allen (27 saves / 28 shots)

March 24	Lewiston Maineiacs	2 – 5	Drummondville Voltigeurs	Androscoggin Bank Colisée	Recap
6:19 - pp - Billy Lacasse (1)		First period	Sean Couturier (3) - pp - 17:17
13:41 - Oskar Orrpars (1)		Second period	No scoring
No scoring		Third period	Rémi Blanchard (1) - pp - 8:44; Charles Landry (1) - 13:52; Gabriel Dumont (5) - 15:21; Ondřej Palát (1) - pp - 16:41
Adrien Lemay (43 saves / 48 shots)		Goalie stats	Jake Allen (22 saves / 24 shots)

Drummondville won series 4 – 0

==== (2C) Victoriaville Tigres vs. (3C) Shawinigan Cataractes ====
March 19	Victoriaville Tigres	6 – 2	Shawinigan Cataractes	Colisée Desjardins	Recap
2:21 - pp - Tomáš Kubalík (1); 12:26 - Philip-Michael Devos (1); 13:24 - Chris Doyle (1)		First period	Maximilien Le Sieur (1) - 18:16
0:34 - pp - Travis McIsaac (1)		Second period	Pierrick Martel (1) - 6:03
6:00 - pp - Andrej Nestrašil (1); 18:20 - en - Chris Doyle (2)		Third period	No scoring
Kevin Poulin (35 saves / 37 shots)		Goalie stats	Marc-Antoine Gélinas (6 saves / 9 shots); Gabriel Girard (14 saves / 16 shots)

March 20	Victoriaville Tigres	1 – 2	Shawinigan Cataractes	Colisée Desjardins	Recap
14:27 - pp - Travis McIsaac (2)		First period	Philippe Paradis (1) - 0:39; Philippe Paradis (2) - pp - 2:37
No scoring		Second period	No scoring
No scoring		Third period	No scoring
Kevin Poulin (39 saves / 41 shots)		Goalie stats	Gabriel Girard (32 saves / 33 shots)

March 23	Shawinigan Cataractes	4 – 3	Victoriaville Tigres	Centre Bionest	Recap
No scoring		First period	Joël Champagne (1) - 11:37
6:44 - Antoine Houde-Caron (1); 10:31 - Michaël Bournival (1)		Second period	Travis McIsaac (3) - 6:19; Chris Doyle (3) - 11:33
13:25 - Dave Labrecque (1); 19:56 - Dominik Schlumpf (1)		Third period	No scoring
Gabriel Girard (26 saves / 29 shots)		Goalie stats	Kevin Poulin (39 saves / 43 shots)

March 24	Shawinigan Cataractes	1 – 4	Victoriaville Tigres	Centre Bionest	Recap
No scoring		First period	Samuel Groulx (1) - 15:09
16:55 - Michaël Bournival (2)		Second period	Joël Champagne (2) - pp - 0:44; Yanni Gourde (1) - 16:06
No scoring		Third period	Travis McIsaac (4) - 10:42
Gabriel Girard (23 saves / 27 shots)		Goalie stats	Kevin Poulin (27 saves / 28 shots)

March 26	Victoriaville Tigres	4 – 3	Shawinigan Cataractes	Colisée Desjardins	Recap
15:14 - sh - Philip-Michael Devos (2)		First period	Antoine Houde-Caron (2) - 17:13
14:36 - pp - Tomáš Kubalík (2); 15:01 - pp - Joël Champagne (3)		Second period	No scoring
4:02 - pp - Joël Chouinard (1)		Third period	Joé Dubé (1) - 15:45; Pierrick Martel (2) - 17:50
Kevin Poulin (29 saves / 32 shots)		Goalie stats	Marc-Antoine Gélinas (31 saves / 35 shots)

March 28	Shawinigan Cataractes	1 – 2	OT	Victoriaville Tigres	Centre Bionest	Recap
No scoring		First period		No scoring
14:43 - sh - Antoine Houde-Caron (3)		Second period		Joël Champagne (4) - pp - 13:34
No scoring		Third period		No scoring
No scoring		First overtime period		Philip-Michael Devos (3) - pp - 13:04
Marc-Antoine Gélinas (45 saves / 47 shots)		Goalie stats		Kevin Poulin (38 saves / 39 shots)

Victoriaville won series 4 – 2

=== Division Telus Est ===
==== (1E) Quebec Remparts vs. (5A) Acadie-Bathurst Titan ====
March 18	Quebec Remparts	6 – 5	OT	Acadie-Bathurst Titan	Colisée Pepsi	Recap
3:29 - Jonathan Audy-Marchessault (1); 11:11 - Dmitri Kugryshev (1); 18:37 - pp - Olivier Hinse (1)		First period		David Gilbert (1) - 1:35; Jérémie Blain (1) - pp - 10:48
3:28 - sh - Marc-Olivier Vallerand (1); 10:47 - pp - Danick Paquette (1)		Second period		Jonathan Lessard (1) - 10:06; David Gilbert (2) - sh - 18:36
No scoring		Third period		Éric Faille (1) - 2:50
12:18 - Olivier Hinse (2)		First overtime period		No scoring
Louis Domingue (35 saves / 40 shots)		Goalie stats		Guillaume Nadeau (10 saves / 13 shots); François Lacerte (29 saves / 32 shots)

March 19	Quebec Remparts	5 – 4	OT	Acadie-Bathurst Titan	Colisée Pepsi	Recap
13:32 - pp - Marc-Olivier Vallerand (2)		First period		Sébastien Trudeau (1) - 9:17; David Gilbert (3) - pp - 10:09
7:35 - pp - Marc-Olivier Vallerand (3); 15:43 - Ryan Bourque (1)		Second period		Taylor Lambke (1) - 10:59; Jonathan Lessard (2) - 19:13
16:16 - Ryan Bourque (2)		Third period		No scoring
0:40 - Olivier Hinse (3)		First overtime period		No scoring
Louis Domingue (20 saves / 24 shots)		Goalie stats		François Lacerte (30 saves / 35 shots)

March 23	Acadie-Bathurst Titan	4 – 2	Quebec Remparts	K.C. Irving Regional Centre	Recap
No scoring		First period	No scoring
8:39 - Taylor Lambke (2)		Second period	Dominic Savoie (1) - pp - 15:09
3:24 - Jonathan Lessard (3); 3:59 - Sébastien Trudeau (2); 19:47 - en - Éric Faille (2)		Third period	Dmitri Kugryshev (2) - sh - 18:53
François Lacerte (39 saves / 41 shots)		Goalie stats	Louis Domingue (20 saves / 23 shots); Antoine Tardif (2 saves / 2 shots)

March 24	Acadie-Bathurst Titan	3 – 7	Quebec Remparts	K.C. Irving Regional Centre	Recap
No scoring		First period	Patrick Cusack (1) - pp - 19:34
1:25 - pp - Jérémie Blain (2); 6:27 - pp - David Gilbert (4); 9:33 - pp - Sébastien Trudeau (3)		Second period	Dmitri Kugryshev (3) - pp - 0:40; Mikhail Stefanovich (1) - 10:59; Marc-Olivier Vallerand (4) - 16:06
No scoring		Third period	Jonathan Audy-Marchessault (2) - 6:14; Jonathan Audy-Marchessault (3) - 10:59; Olivier Hinse (4) - pp - 17:22
François Lacerte (37 saves / 44 shots)		Goalie stats	Louis Domingue (29 saves / 32 shots); Antoine Tardif (16 saves / 16 shots)

March 26	Quebec Remparts	6 – 5	Acadie-Bathurst Titan	Colisée Pepsi	Recap
1:25 - Ryan Bourque (3); 3:38 - pp - Dmitri Kugryshev (4)		First period	Ryan McKiernan (1) - pp - 8:02; Jérémie Malouin (1) - 11:05; Danick Malouin (1) - pp - 15:13
3:11 - pp - Mikhail Stefanovich (2)		Second period	David Gilbert (5) - pp - 1:16
1:06 - pp - Mikaël Tam (1); 4:33 - pp - Mikaël Tam (2); 6:52 - pp - Mikhail Stefanovich (3)		Third period	Taylor Lambke (3) - pp - 16:54
Antoine Tardif (11 saves / 14 shots); Louis Domingue (15 saves / 17 shots)		Goalie stats	François Lacerte (34 saves / 40 shots)

Quebec won series 4 – 1

==== (2E) Rimouski Océanic vs. (3E) Chicoutimi Saguenéens ====
March 19	Rimouski Océanic	4 – 3	OT	Chicoutimi Saguenéens	Colisée de Rimouski	Recap
1:54 - pp - Félix Lefrançois (1); 7:09 - pp - Ryan Kavanagh (1); 19:17 - Ryan Kavanagh (2)		First period		No scoring
No scoring		Second period		No scoring
No scoring		Third period		Dominic Jalbert (1) - 0:37; Emrik Guillemette (1) - pp - 3:44; Antoine Roussel (1) - pp - 19:08
8:10 - Gleason Fournier (1)		First overtime period		No scoring
Matthew Dopud (20 saves / 23 shots)		Goalie stats		Robin Gusse (19 saves / 23 shots)

March 20	Rimouski Océanic	9 – 3	Chicoutimi Saguenéens	Colisée de Rimouski	Recap
1:06 - Félix Lefrançois; 6:46 - Ryan Kavanagh (3); 9:34 - pp - Ryan Kavanagh (4); 11:44 - Alex Belzile (1); 12:21 - Gabriel Vallée (1); 17:27 - pp - Alex Belzile (2)		First period	Alexandre Lavoie (1) - 1:40
4:46 - Alex Émond (1); 16:24 - Charles-Antoine Roy (1)		Second period	No scoring
15:29 - pp - Alex Émond (2)		Third period	Rock Régimbald (1) - pp - 8:19; Mathieu Populus (1) - sh - 12:25
Matthew Dopud (20 saves / 23 shots); Philippe Tremblay (1 save / 1 shot)		Goalie stats	Robin Gusse (6 saves / 10 shots); Christopher Gibson (17 saves / 22 shots)

March 23	Chicoutimi Saguenéens	6 – 2	Rimouski Océanic	Centre Georges-Vézina	Recap
No scoring		First period	Jakub Culek (1) - 12:35
8:07 - Éric Gélinas (1); 9:52 - Alexandre Lavoie (2); 11:28 - pp - Emrik Guillemette (2); 12:13 - Antoine Roussel (2); 17:45 - pp - Emrik Guillemette (3)		Second period	No scoring
17:44 - pp - Nicolas Therrien (1)		Third period	Alexandre Durette (1) - 19:35
Robin Gusse (19 saves / 21 shots)		Goalie stats	Matthew Dopud (20 saves / 26 shots)

March 24	Chicoutimi Saguenéens	2 – 4	Rimouski Océanic	Centre Georges-Vézina	Recap
No scoring		First period	Petr Straka (1) - pp - 2:29; Petr Straka (2) - 8:00
10:43 - Michaël Bélanger (1)		Second period	Alex Émond (3) - 19:13
2:51 - Alexandre Roy (1)		Third period	Gleason Fournier (2) - en - 19:57
Robin Gusse (24 saves / 27 shots)		Goalie stats	Matthew Dopud (22 saves / 24 shots)

March 26	Rimouski Océanic	5 – 6	OT	Chicoutimi Saguenéens	Colisée de Rimouski	Recap
1:12 - Jakub Culek (2); 8:44 - Jakub Culek (3); 10:12 - Alex Émond (4)		First period		Adam Bourque-Leblanc (1) - 14:30; Alexis Piette (1) - 15:27; Antoine Roussel (3) - pp - 19:01
12:24 - Alex Émond (5); 16:03 - Alex Belzile (3)		Second period		Nicolas Therrien (2) - pp - 18:55
No scoring		Third period		Michaël Bélanger (2) - sh - 0:33
No scoring		First overtime period		Rock Régimbald (2) - 1:28
Matthew Dopud (24 saves / 30 shots)		Goalie stats		Robin Gusse (5 saves / 8 shots); Christopher Gibson (23 saves / 25 shots)

March 28	Chicoutimi Saguenéens	4 – 3	Rimouski Océanic	Centre Georges-Vézina	Recap
2:27 - Emrik Guillemette (4); 14:32 - pp - Steve Lebel (1); 18:49 - Mathieu Populus (2)		First period	No scoring
1:39 - Antoine Roussel (4)		Second period	Alexandre Mallet (1) - pp - 6:48; Petr Straka (3) - 18:25
No scoring		Third period	Alex Belzile (4) - pp - 5:19
Christopher Gibson (18 saves / 21 shots)		Goalie stats	Philippe Tremblay (23 saves / 27 shots)

March 30	Rimouski Océanic	3 – 2	OT	Chicoutimi Saguenéens	Colisée de Rimouski	Recap
5:46 - pp - Jakub Culek (4)		First period		No scoring
11:22 - Ryan Kavanagh (5)		Second period		Marc-André Levasseur (1) - 4:01; Alexandre Roy (2) - 16:31
No scoring		Third period		No scoring
10:32 - Ryan Kavanagh (6)		First overtime period		No scoring
Matthew Dopud (33 saves / 35 shots)		Goalie stats		Christopher Gibson (30 saves / 33 shots)

Rimouski won series 4 – 3

=== Division Telus Ouest ===
==== (1O) Rouyn-Noranda Huskies vs. (4O) Val-d'Or Foreurs ====
March 19	Rouyn-Noranda Huskies	4 – 7	Val-d'Or Foreurs	Aréna Dave Keon	Recap
6:56 - pp - Christophe Losier (1)		First period	Marco Scandella (1) - 0:20
10:15 - pp - Nicolas Deslauriers (1); 15:33 - pp - Gabriel Lévesque (1)		Second period	Simon Lacroix (1) - pp - 7:10; Olivier Dallaire (1) - pp - 17:51; Vincent Couture (1) - 19:41
5:14 - pp - Jordan Caron (1)		Third period	Simon Lacroix (2) - 6:55; Alexandre Touchette (1) - 11:38; Jonathan Hazen (1) - en - 19:02
Nicholas Champion (15 saves / 21 shots)		Goalie stats	Raphaël D'Orso (31 saves / 35 shots)

March 20	Rouyn-Noranda Huskies	5 – 3	Val-d'Or Foreurs	Aréna Dave Keon	Recap
11:12 - Philippe Cornet (1); 17:39 - pp - Nicolas Deslauriers (2); 18:55 - pp - Jordan Caron (2)		First period	Samuel Morneau (1) - pp - 8:54; Jonathan Hazen (2) - pp - 13:10
No scoring		Second period	Maxime Sauvé (1) - 7:22
1:14 - pp - Dmitry Kostromitin (1); 19:47 - en - Jordan Caron (3)		Third period	No scoring
Nicholas Champion (16 saves / 19 shots)		Goalie stats	Raphaël D'Orso (26 saves / 30 shots)

March 23	Val-d'Or Foreurs	0 – 1	Rouyn-Noranda Huskies	Centre Air Creebec	Recap
No scoring		First period	No scoring
No scoring		Second period	Antoine Quevillon (1) - 4:12
No scoring		Third period	No scoring
Raphaël D'Orso (30 saves / 31 shots)		Goalie stats	Nicholas Champion (16 saves / 16 shots)

March 24	Val-d'Or Foreurs	4 – 3	Rouyn-Noranda Huskies	Centre Air Creebec	Recap
11:42 - Nicolas Boyer (1)		First period	No scoring
16:12 - Maxime Sauvé (2)		Second period	Jordan Caron (4) - 13:30
3:35 - Gabriel Beaupré (1); 5:26 - pp - Maxime Sauvé (3)		Third period	Steven Delisle (1) - 13:18; Christophe Losier (2) - 14:13
Raphaël D'Orso (29 saves / 32 shots)		Goalie stats	Nicholas Champion (22 saves / 26 shots)

March 26	Rouyn-Noranda Huskies	9 – 4	Val-d'Or Foreurs	Aréna Dave Keon	Recap
1:53 - Christophe Losier (3); 6:37 - pp - Pier-Luc Giguère (1)		First period	Marco Scandella (2) - pp - 13:01; Samuel Morneau (2) - pp - 13:19
0:09 - Jordan Caron (5); 2:36 - pp - Pier-Luc Giguère (2); 16:30 - pp - Jérôme Gauthier-Leduc (1)		Second period	Maxime Sauvé (4) - 1:49; Samuel Morneau (3) - pp - 3:51
4:07 - Christophe Losier (4); 12:45 - ps - Pier-Luc Giguère (3); 15:42 - pp - Philippe Cornet (2); 18:29 - pp - Jeff Desjardins (1)		Third period	No scoring
Nicholas Champion (7 saves / 11 shots); Mickaël Audette (9 saves / 9 shots)		Goalie stats	Raphaël D'Orso (25 saves / 33 shots); Jacob Gervais-Chouinard (1 save / 2 shots)

March 28	Val-d'Or Foreurs	1 – 5	Rouyn-Noranda Huskies	Centre Air Creebec	Recap
17:43 - Maxime Sauvé (5)		First period	Jordan Caron (6) - pp - 9:13; Alexandre Beauregard (1) - 14:30; Jeff Desjardins (2) - 16:17; Jean-Sébastien Bérubé (1) -
No scoring		Second period	Philippe Cornet (3) - 14:38
No scoring		Third period	No scoring
Raphaël D'Orso (38 saves / 43 shots); Jacob Gervais-Chouinard (3 saves / 3 shots)		Goalie stats	Nicholas Champion (16 saves / 17 shots)

Rouyn-Noranda won series 4 – 2

==== (2O) Montreal Junior Hockey Club vs. (3O) Gatineau Olympiques ====
March 19	Montreal Junior Hockey Club	3 – 2	OT	Gatineau Olympiques	Auditorium de Verdun	Recap
12:38 - Nicolas Chouinard (1)		First period		Adam Jánošík (1) - pp - 5:41
13:52 - pp - Trevor Parkes (1)		Second period		No scoring
No scoring		Third period		Mitchell Porowski (1) - 13:55
9:13 - Eliezer Sherbatov (1)		First overtime period		No scoring
Jean-François Bérubé (26 saves / 28 shots)		Goalie stats		Maxime Clermont (34 saves / 37 shots)

March 20	Montreal Junior Hockey Club	2 – 4	Gatineau Olympiques	Auditorium de Verdun	Recap
No scoring		First period	Adam Jánošík (2) - pp - 8:32; Mathieu Gagnon (1) - pp - 17:13
4:01 - pp - Jérémy Gouchie (1)		Second period	Tye McGinn (1) - pp - 11:23
4:34 - pp - Trevor Parkes (2)		Third period	Jean-Gabriel Pageau (1) - pp - en - 19:41
Jean-François Bérubé (21 saves / 24 shots)		Goalie stats	Maxime Clermont (35 saves / 37 shots)

March 22	Gatineau Olympiques	2 – 5	Montreal Junior Hockey Club	Centre Robert Guertin	Recap
11:46 - pp - Yoan Pinette (1)		First period	Matthew Brenton (1) - 13:30
16:28 - pp - Hugo Laporte (1)		Second period	Trevor Parkes (3) - pp - 5:00; Vincent Bourgeois (1) - 7:18; Trevor Parkes (4) - 13:20
No scoring		Third period	Louis-Marc Aubry (1) - pp - 9:17
Maxime Clermont (19 saves / 24 shots)		Goalie stats	Jean-François Bérubé (22 saves / 24 shots)

March 24	Gatineau Olympiques	2 – 4	Montreal Junior Hockey Club	Centre Robert Guertin	Recap
9:56 - pp - Denis Kindl (1)		First period	David Štich (1) - pp - 5:58; David Štich (2) - 17:29
No scoring		Second period	Trevor Parkes (5) - 14:17
2:58 - sh - Alex Beaton (1)		Third period	Matthew Brenton (2) - sh - 7:05
Maxime Clermont (8 saves / 10 shots); Dereck Tait (13 saves / 15 shots)		Goalie stats	Jean-François Bérubé (37 saves / 39 shots)

March 26	Montreal Junior Hockey Club	2 – 3	Gatineau Olympiques	Auditorium de Verdun	Recap
No scoring		First period	Denis Kindl (2) - 1:47
4:57 - Matthew Brenton (3); 13:05 - Matthew Brenton (4)		Second period	Christian Ouellet (1) - pp - 3:29; Joshua Domingues (1) - 14:24
No scoring		Third period	No scoring
Jean-François Bérubé (20 saves / 23 shots)		Goalie stats	Maxime Clermont (30 saves / 32 shots)

March 27	Gatineau Olympiques	4 – 1	Montreal Junior Hockey Club	Centre Robert Guertin	Recap
11:07 - Adam Jánošík (3)		First period	No scoring
No scoring		Second period	Guillaume Asselin (1) - 18:55
4:17 - Olivier Croteau (1); 14:25 - pp - Denis Kindl (3); 15:52 - pp - Yoan Pinette (2)		Third period	No scoring
Maxime Clermont (18 saves / 19 shots)		Goalie stats	Jean-François Bérubé (24 saves / 28 shots)

March 30	Montreal Junior Hockey Club	1 – 2	2OT	Gatineau Olympiques	Auditorium de Verdun	Recap
No scoring		First period		No scoring
No scoring		Second period		No scoring
12:37 - pp - Trevor Parkes (6)		Third period		Hubert Labrie (1) - 2:57
No scoring		Second overtime period		Hubert Labrie (2) - 1:58
Jean-François Bérubé (33 saves / 35 shots)		Goalie stats		Maxime Clermont (36 saves / 37 shots)

Gatineau won series 4 – 3

== Quarter-finals ==
=== (1) Saint John Sea Dogs vs. (12) Gatineau Olympiques ===
April 2	Saint John Sea Dogs	7 – 4	Gatineau Olympiques	Harbour Station	Recap
8:21 - Tomáš Jurčo (3); 11:11 - Stanislav Galiev (3); 17:37 - Michael Kirkpatrick (2)		First period	No scoring
18:42 - pp - Stanislav Galiev (4)		Second period	Adam Jánošík (4) - pp - 7:37; Mitchell Porowski (2) - pp - 13:55; Benjamin Laliberté (1) - 16:12
2:42 - Nicholas Pard (2); 11:23 - Michael Kirkpatrick (3); 19:18 - pp - Mike Hoffman (4)		Third period	Hubert Labrie (3) - 14:18
Marco Cousineau (15 saves / 19 shots)		Goalie stats	Maxime Clermont (26 saves / 33 shots)

April 3	Saint John Sea Dogs	7 – 2	Gatineau Olympiques	Harbour Station	Recap
10:46 - Stanislav Galiev (5); 17:00 - pp - Tomáš Jurčo (4)		First period	No scoring
5:30 - Jonathan Huberdeau (6)		Second period	No scoring
2:10 - Jonathan Huberdeau (7); 11:28 - pp - Nick Petersen (3); 13:03 - pp - Stephen MacAulay (1); 19:38 - Zack Phillips (2)		Third period	Alex Beaton (2) - pp - 5:05; Adam Jánošík (5) - pp - 18:28
Marco Cousineau (30 saves / 32 shots)		Goalie stats	Maxime Clermont (34 saves / 41 shots)

April 6	Gatineau Olympiques	0 – 6	Saint John Sea Dogs	Robert Guertin Centre	Recap
No scoring		First period	Michael Kirkpatrick (4) - pp - 6:41; Michael Kirkpatrick (5) - 14:40
No scoring		Second period	Jonathan Huberdeau (8) - 15:14
No scoring		Third period	Nathan Beaulieu (2) - pp - 1:39; Nick Petersen (4) - 5:07; Nathan Beaulieu (3) - 7:26
Maxime Clermont (28 saves / 33 shots); Dereck Tait (8 saves / 9 shots)		Goalie stats	Marco Cousineau (18 saves / 18 shots)

April 7	Gatineau Olympiques	2 – 4	Saint John Sea Dogs	Robert Guertin Centre	Recap
17:42 - ps - Philippe Halley (1)		First period	No scoring
7:35 - Tye McGinn (2)		Second period	Tomáš Jurčo (5) - 12:55; Yann Sauvé (1) - pp - 17:43
No scoring		Third period	Jonathan Huberdeau (9) - 12:07; Michael Kirkpatrick (6) - en - 19:26
Maxime Clermont (31 saves / 34 shots)		Goalie stats	Marco Cousineau (20 saves / 22 shots)

Saint John won series 4 – 0

=== (2) Drummondville Voltigeurs vs. (9) Rimouski Océanic ===
April 2	Drummondville Voltigeurs	5 – 4	OT	Rimouski Océanic	Centre Marcel Dionne	Recap
2:07 - Christopher DiDomenico (3)		First period		Jakub Culek (5) - 11:51
0:37 - sh - Marc-Antoine Desnoyers (2); 14:25 - pp - Gabriel Dumont (6)		Second period		Ryan Kavanagh (7) - pp - 6:35; Petr Straka (4) - 7:36
18:48 - Sean Couturier (4)		Third period		Alexandre Mallet (2) - ps - 2:12
0:24 - Sean Couturier (5)		First overtime period		No scoring
Jake Allen (19 saves / 23 shots)		Goalie stats		Matthew Dopud (30 saves / 35 shots)

April 3	Drummondville Voltigeurs	3 – 0	Rimouski Océanic	Centre Marcel Dionne	Recap
3:49 - pp - Gabriel Dumont (7)		First period	No scoring
9:06 - pp - Marc-Olivier Vachon (4)		Second period	No scoring
17:47 - Gabriel Dumont (8)		Third period	No scoring
Jake Allen (16 saves / 16 shots)		Goalie stats	Philippe Tremblay (47 saves / 50 shots)

April 6	Rimouski Océanic	5 – 2	Drummondville Voltigeurs	Colisée de Rimouski	Recap
7:20 - Charles-Antoine Roy (2)		First period	Christopher DiDomenico (4) - 4:55
13:43 - Alexandre Durette (2)		Second period	No scoring
4:35 - Petr Straka (5); 11:57 - Alex Belzile (5); 19:08 - pp - en - Alex Belzile (6)		Third period	Philippe Lefebvre (2) - 15:42
Matthew Dopud (40 saves / 42 shots)		Goalie stats	Jake Allen (13 saves / 17 shots); Frédéric Piché (3 saves / 3 shots)

April 7	Rimouski Océanic	2 – 7	Drummondville Voltigeurs	Colisée de Rimouski	Recap
11:29 - Alex Belzile (7)		First period	Christopher DiDomenico (5) - 0:11
8:32 - Jakub Culek (6)		Second period	Sean Couturier (6) - 12:10
No scoring		Third period	Benoît Lévesque (2) - 2:44; Gabriel Dumont (9) - 4:04; Charles Landry (2) - 5:50; Marc-Olivier Vachon (5) - sh - 8:16; Sean Couturier (7) - pp - 16:46
Matthew Dopud (24 saves / 30 shots); Philippe Tremblay (5 saves / 6 shots)		Goalie stats	Jake Allen (20 saves / 22 shots)

April 9	Drummondville Voltigeurs	6 – 1	Rimouski Océanic	Centre Marcel Dionne	Recap
4:50 - Sean Couturier (8); 14:31 - Marc-Antoine Desnoyers (3)		First period	No scoring
0:42 - sh - Gabriel Dumont (10); 9:43 - Marc-Olivier Vachon (6); 10:17 - pp - Marc-Antoine Desnoyers (4)		Second period	Félix Lefrançois (3) - 14:32
10:44 - Marc-Antoine Desnoyers (5)		Third period	No scoring
Jake Allen (11 saves / 12 shots)		Goalie stats	Philippe Tremblay (30 saves / 36 shots); Matthew Dopud (1 save / 1 shot)

Drummondville won series 4 – 1

=== (3) Quebec Remparts vs. (6) Victoriaville Tigres ===
April 2	Quebec Remparts	1 – 4	Victoriaville Tigres	Colisée Pepsi	Recap
3:40 - pp - Marc-Olivier Vallerand (5)		First period	Travis McIsaac (5) - pp - 2:41
No scoring		Second period	Philippe Maillet (1) - 2:26; Guillaume Goulet (1) - 2:44; Tomáš Kubalík (3) - 16:19
No scoring		Third period	No scoring
Louis Domingue (25 saves / 29 shots)		Goalie stats	Kevin Poulin (22 saves / 23 shots)

April 3	Quebec Remparts	2 – 4	Victoriaville Tigres	Colisée Pepsi	Recap
No scoring		First period	Guillaume Goulet (2) - 3:23
8:17 - Marc-Olivier Vallerand (6)		Second period	Philippe Maillet (2) - 11:06; Yanni Gourde (2) - 19:01
5:29 - pp - Marc-Olivier Vallerand (7)		Third period	Joël Champagne (5) - en - 19:14
Louis Domingue (24 saves / 27 shots)		Goalie stats	Kevin Poulin (31 saves / 33 shots)

April 5	Victoriaville Tigres	6 – 1	Quebec Remparts	Colisée Desjardins	Recap
8:24 - pp - Joël Champagne (6)		First period	No scoring
4:53 - Philippe Maillet (3); 6:25 - pp - Philip-Michael Devos (4); 8:31 - Philip-Michael Devos (5)		Second period	No scoring
2:03 - Philip-Michael Devos (6); 4:22 - pp - Philippe Maillet (4)		Third period	Mikaël Tam (3) - pp - 9:45
Kevin Poulin (28 saves / 29 shots)		Goalie stats	Louis Domingue (25 saves / 31 shots)

April 7	Victoriaville Tigres	4 – 2	Quebec Remparts	Colisée Desjardins	Recap
10:05 - Philippe Maillet (5)		First period	Olivier Hinse (5) - 2:57
0:53 - pp - Joël Chouinard (2); 8:51 - Keven Dupont (1)		Second period	Dominic Savoie (2) - 9:50
19:18 - pp - en - Travis McIsaac (6)		Third period	No scoring
Kevin Poulin (26 saves / 28 shots)		Goalie stats	Louis Domingue (14 saves / 17 shots); Antoine Tardif (12 saves / 12 shots)

Victoriaville won series 4 – 0

=== (4) Rouyn-Noranda Huskies vs. (5) Moncton Wildcats ===
April 2	Rouyn-Noranda Huskies	1 – 6	Moncton Wildcats	Aréna Dave Keon	Recap
5:50 - pp - Jeff Desjardins (3)		First period	Devon MacAusland (2) - 1:40; Ted Stephens (1) - pp - 2:35; Daniel Pettersson (2) - 8:03; Mark Barberio (2) - pp - 9:27; Randy Cameron (5) - 11:38
No scoring		Second period	Kelsey Tessier (5) - pp - 6:10
No scoring		Third period	No scoring
Nicholas Champion (2 saves / 5 shots); Mickaël Audette (18 saves / 21 shots)		Goalie stats	Nicola Riopel (30 saves / 31 shots)

April 3	Rouyn-Noranda Huskies	3 – 4	OT	Moncton Wildcats	Aréna Dave Keon	Recap
No scoring		First period		Randy Cameron (6) - 6:48
4:16 - sh - Sergei Ostapchuk (1)		Second period		Allain Saulnier (1) - 8:57; Devon MacAusland (3) - 16:25
16:09 - Gabriel O'Connor (1); 17:54 - Jérôme Gauthier-Leduc (2)		Third period		No scoring
No scoring		First overtime period		Daniel Pettersson (3) - 2:43
Nicholas Champion (27 saves / 31 shots)		Goalie stats		Nicola Riopel (38 saves / 41 shots)

April 6	Moncton Wildcats	7 – 2	Rouyn-Noranda Huskies	Moncton Coliseum	Recap
0:17 - Gabriel Bourque (3); 16:12 - Mark Barberio (3); 17:41 - Gabriel Bourque (4); 18:51 - pp - Gabriel Bourque (5)		First period	Philippe Cornet (4) - 13:34; Dmitri Kostromitin (2) - 17:58
12:29 - Gabriel Bourque (6); 19:01 - pp - Kelsey Tessier (6)		Second period	No scoring
2:44 - pp - Simon Jodoin (1)		Third period	No scoring
Nicola Riopel (21 saves / 23 shots)		Goalie stats	Nicholas Champion (4 saves / 8 shots); Mickaël Audette (20 saves / 23 shots)

April 9	Moncton Wildcats	4 – 5	2OT	Rouyn-Noranda Huskies	Moncton Coliseum	Recap
1:18 - pp - Nicolas Deschamps (4); 3:07 - Randy Cameron (7); 9:22 - pp - Kelsey Tessier (7)		First period		No scoring
No scoring		Second period		Jérôme Raymond (1) - 13:03
19:36 - Kelsey Tessier (8)		Third period		Gabriel Lévesque (2) - 3:09; Sergei Ostapchuk (2) - pp - 13:25; Jordan Caron (7) - 19:19
No scoring		Second overtime period		Philippe Cornet (5) - 14:28
Nicola Riopel (42 saves / 47 shots)		Goalie stats		Mickaël Audette (46 saves / 50 shots)

April 10	Moncton Wildcats	3 – 1	Rouyn-Noranda Huskies	Moncton Coliseum	Recap
Randy Cameron (8) - pp - 4:15		First period	No scoring
No scoring		Second period	No scoring
Gabriel Bourque (7) - 0:14; Daniel Pettersson (4) - 5:00		Third period	4:00 - Alexandre Beauregard (2)
Nicola Riopel (17 saves / 18 shots)		Goalie stats	Mickaël Audette (24 saves / 27 shots)

Moncton won series 4 – 1

== Semi-finals ==
=== (1) Saint John Sea Dogs vs. (6) Victoriaville Tigres ===
April 16	Saint John Sea Dogs	4 – 2	Victoriaville Tigres	Harbour Station	Recap
10:26 - Michael Kirkpatrick (7)		First period	Brandon Hynes (1) - 6:32; Guillaume Goulet (3) - 9:11
No scoring		Second period	No scoring
3:06 - Mike Hoffman (5); 15:54 - Mike Thomas (3); 18:37 - pp - Michael Kirkpatrick (8)		Third period	No scoring
Marco Cousineau (27 saves / 29 shots)		Goalie stats	Kevin Poulin (28 saves / 32 shots)

April 17	Saint John Sea Dogs	5 – 1	Victoriaville Tigres	Harbour Station	Recap
18:58 - pp - Nicholas Pard (3)		First period	Brandon Hynes (2) - 16:27
0:32 - Tomáš Jurčo (6); 4:41 - pp - Stanislav Galiev (6); 11:10 - Danick Gauthier (3)		Second period	No scoring
7:28 - pp - Jonathan Huberdeau (10)		Third period	No scoring
Marco Cousineau (32 saves / 33 shots)		Goalie stats	Kevin Poulin (32 saves / 37 shots)

April 20	Victoriaville Tigres	6 – 3	Saint John Sea Dogs	Colisée Desjardins	Recap
7:07 - Philippe Maillet (6); 8:06 - pp - Chris Doyle (4); 13:55 - Philip-Michael Devos (7)		First period	No scoring
9:21 - Joël Champagne (7); 17:30 - pp - Travis McIsaac (7)		Second period	Simon Després (1) - pp - 10:41
13:26 - pp - Philip-Michael Devos (8)		Third period	Michael Kirkpatrick (9) - pp - 1:59; Yann Sauvé (2) - pp - 3:29
Kevin Poulin (43 saves / 46 shots)		Goalie stats	Marco Cousineau (30 saves / 35 shots); Karel St-Laurent (9 saves / 10 shots)

April 23	Victoriaville Tigres	1 – 6	Saint John Sea Dogs	Colisée Desjardins	Recap
No scoring		First period	Michael Kirkpatrick (10) - 1:51; Nicholas Pard (4) - 5:59
No scoring		Second period	Mike Hoffman (6) - pp - 14:03; Stanislav Galiev (7) - 17:43
3:24 - pp - Emmanuel Boudreau (1)		Third period	Nicholas Pard (5) - 1:54; Chuckie Schembri (1) - 18:03
Kevin Poulin (27 saves / 33 shots)		Goalie stats	Marco Cousineau (39 saves / 40 shots)

April 24	Victoriaville Tigres	4 – 2	Saint John Sea Dogs	Colisée Desjardins	Recap
Joël Chouinard (3) - 2:47; Yannick Dubé (1) - 7:40		First period	19:30 - Stanislav Galiev (8)
No scoring		Second period	No scoring
Philip-Michael Devos (9) - 2:59; Tomáš Kubalík (4) - en - 19:37		Third period	0:47 - ps - Yann Sauvé (3)
Kevin Poulin (43 saves / 45 shots)		Goalie stats	Marco Cousineau (24 saves / 27 shots)

April 26	Saint John Sea Dogs	7 – 1	Victoriaville Tigres	Harbour Station	Recap
Simon Després (2) - pp - 9:16; Mike Hoffman (7) - pp - 10:38; Nick Petersen (5) - 19:41		First period	No scoring
Jonathan Huberdeau (11) - 2:38		Second period	No scoring
Mike Hoffman (8) - sh - 2:55; Tomáš Jurčo (7) - pp - 5:46; Mike Hoffman (9) - 9:55		Third period	1:40 - Andrej Nestrašil (2)
Marco Cousineau (31 saves / 32 shots)		Goalie stats	Kevin Poulin (25 saves / 32 shots)

Saint John won series 4 – 2

=== (2) Drummondville Voltigeurs vs. (5) Moncton Wildcats ===
April 16	Drummondville Voltigeurs	3 – 5	Moncton Wildcats	Centre Marcel Dionne	Recap
2:14 - Sean Couturier (9)		First period	Simon Jodoin (2) - 1:23; Nicolas Deschamps (5) - 17:53
5:37 - Sean Couturier (10)		Second period	Gabriel Bourque (8) - 6:04; Alex Saulnier (2) - 9:45
17:13 - pp - Rémi Blanchard (2)		Third period	Scott Brannon (1) - 6:22
Jake Allen (23 saves / 28 shots)		Goalie stats	Nicola Riopel (34 saves / 37 shots)

April 18	Drummondville Voltigeurs	2 – 5	Moncton Wildcats	Centre Marcel Dionne	Recap
0:40 - Christopher DiDomenico (6); 15:57 - pp - Christopher DiDomenico (7)		First period	Kelsey Tessier (9) - 11:17
No scoring		Second period	Kelsey Tessier (10) - pp - 13:40; Devon MacAusland (4) - 18:56
No scoring		Third period	Mark Barberio (4) - pp - 12:23; Scott Brannon (2) - en - 19:16
Jake Allen (28 saves / 32 shots)		Goalie stats	Nicola Riopel (27 saves / 29 shots)

April 20	Moncton Wildcats	1 – 2	OT	Drummondville Voltigeurs	Moncton Coliseum	Recap
13:02 - Gabriel Bourque (9)		First period		No scoring
No scoring		Second period		Marc-Olivier Vachon (7) - 16:25
No scoring		Third period		No scoring
No scoring		First overtime period		Charles Landry (3) - 9:54
Nicola Riopel (32 saves / 34 shots)		Goalie stats		Jake Allen (40 saves / 41 shots)

April 21	Moncton Wildcats	4 – 0	Drummondville Voltigeurs	Moncton Coliseum	Recap
8:51 - pp - Gabriel Bourque (10)		First period	No scoring
6:02 - Mark Barberio (5)		Second period	No scoring
6:06 - Cole MacMillan (1); 9:59 - pp - Gabriel Bourque (11)		Third period	No scoring
Nicola Riopel (34 saves / 34 shots)		Goalie stats	Jake Allen (35 saves / 39 shots)

April 23	Drummondville Voltigeurs	2 – 4	Moncton Wildcats	Centre Marcel Dionne	Recap
2:53 - Gabriel Dumont (11)		First period	Daniel Pettersson (5) - 1:09; Ted Stephens (2) - 11:31
3:03 - Rémi Blanchard (3)		Second period	Allain Saulnier (2) - 17:38
No scoring		Third period	Brandon Gormley (1) - en - 19:29
Jake Allen (15 saves / 18 shots)		Goalie stats	Nicola Riopel (35 saves / 37 shots)

Moncton won series 4 – 1

== QMJHL Championship ==
=== (1) Saint John Sea Dogs vs. (5) Moncton Wildcats ===
April 30	Saint John Sea Dogs	1 – 5	Moncton Wildcats	Harbour Station	Recap
1:18 - Danick Gauthier (4)		First period	Brandon Gormley (2) - 0:14; Gabriel Bourque (12) - 15:47
No scoring		Second period	Gabriel Bourque (13) - pp - 15:17; Ted Stephens (3) - pp - 18:19
No scoring		Third period	Gabriel Bourque (14) - en - 17:25
Marco Cousineau (33 saves / 37 shots)		Goalie stats	Nicola Riopel (25 saves / 26 shots); Shane Owen (0 saves / 0 shots)

May 2	Moncton Wildcats	9 – 3	Saint John Sea Dogs	Moncton Coliseum	Recap
Gabriel Bourque (15) - 7:30; Scott Brannon (3) - 13:33		First period	No scoring
Gabriel Bourque (16) - 1:00; Scott Brannon (4) - pp - 7:34; Kelsey Tessier (11) - 11:39; Randy Cameron (9) - 12:22		Second period	2:48 - Danick Gauthier (5); 19:26 - Mike Thomas (4)
Randy Cameron (10) - 1:53; Simon Jodoin (3) - pp - 4:07; Allain Saulnier (3) - pp - 7:48		Third period	15:24 - Chuckie Schembri (2)
Nicola Riopel (24 saves / 27 shots); Shane Owen (1 save / 1 shot)		Goalie stats	Marco Cousineau (9 saves / 13 shots); Karel St-Laurent (14 saves / 19 shots)

May 4	Saint John Sea Dogs	6 – 4	Moncton Wildcats	Harbour Station	Recap
Danick Gauthier (6) - 1:05; Nick Petersen (6) - pp - 16:24		First period	14:46 - Gabriel Bourque (17)
Michael Kirkpatrick (11) - 5:23; Mike Hoffman (10) - pp - 11:16; Michael Kirkpatrick (12) - pp - 14:39		Second period	No scoring
Mike Hoffman (11) - en - 19:53		Third period	11:11 - pp - Randy Cameron (11); 16:11 - Gabriel Bourque (18); 17:40 - Randy Cameron (12)
Marco Cousineau (36 saves / 40 shots)		Goalie stats	Nicola Riopel (14 saves / 18 shots); Shane Owen (11 saves / 12 shots)

May 7	Moncton Wildcats	2 – 3	OT	Saint John Sea Dogs	Moncton Coliseum	Recap
No scoring		First period		Yann Sauvé (4) - 0:47
17:17 - pp - Marek Hrivík (3)		Second period		Michael Kirkpatrick (13) - sh - 16:12
2:40 - Cole MacMillan (2)		Third period		No scoring
No scoring		First overtime period		Nick Petersen (7) - 12:43
Nicola Riopel (31 saves / 34 shots)		Goalie stats		Marco Cousineau (42 saves / 44 shots)

May 8	Saint John Sea Dogs	1 – 5	Moncton Wildcats	Harbour Station	Recap
No scoring		First period	Gabriel Bourque (19) - 9:25; Daniel Pettersson (6) - 19:00
No scoring		Second period	Kelsey Tessier (12) - 10:39; Devon MacAusland (5) - 13:59
11:55 - Nathan Beaulieu (4)		Third period	Devon MacAusland (6) - 17:17
Marco Cousineau (30 saves / 35 shots)		Goalie stats	Nicola Riopel (30 saves / 31 shots)

May 10	Moncton Wildcats	7 – 4	Saint John Sea Dogs	Moncton Coliseum	Recap
13:24 - Randy Cameron (13); 19:10 - Scott Brannon (5)		First period	Stephen MacAulay (2) - 1:00
2:12 - Marek Hrivík (4); 2:54 - Kelsey Tessier (13); 8:53 - Kelsey Tessier (14); 18:21 - Marek Hrivík (5)		Second period	No scoring
18:26 - en - Scott Brannon (6)		Third period	Michael Kirkpatrick (14) - 3:16; Michael Kirkpatrick (15) - 3:43; Yann Sauvé (5) - 17:20
Nicola Riopel (27 saves / 31 shots)		Goalie stats	Marco Cousineau (36 saves / 42 shots)

Moncton won series 4 – 2

== Memorial Cup ==
The 92nd MasterCard Memorial Cup was held in Brandon, Manitoba.

== All-star teams ==
First team

- Goaltender - Jake Allen, Drummondville Voltigeurs
- Defence - David Savard, Moncton Wildcats & Joel Chouinard, Victoriaville Tigres
- Left winger - Mike Hoffman, Saint John Sea Dogs
- Centreman - Luke Adam, Cape Breton Screaming Eagles
- Right winger - Gabriel Dumont, Drummondville Voltigeurs

Second team

- Goaltender - Kevin Poulin, Victoriaville Tigres
- Defence - Brandon Gormley, Moncton Wildcats & Mark Barberio, Moncton Wildcats
- Left winger - Nicolas Deschamps, Moncton Wildcats
- Centreman - Sean Couturier, Drummondville Voltigeurs
- Right winger - Nicholas Petersen, Saint John Sea Dogs

Rookie team

- Goaltender - Robin Gusse, Chicoutimi Saguenéens
- Defence - Adam Polasek, P.E.I. Rocket & Xavier Ouellet, Montreal Junior Hockey Club
- Left winger - Stanislav Galiev, Saint John Sea Dogs
- Centreman - Alexandre Comtois, Drummondville Voltigeurs
- Right winger - Petr Straka, Rimouski Océanic

== Trophies and awards ==
Team

- President's Cup - Moncton Wildcats
- Jean Rougeau Trophy - Regular Season Champions: Saint John Sea Dogs
- Luc Robitaille Trophy - Team that scored the most goals: Saint John Sea Dogs
- Robert Lebel Trophy - Team with best GAA: Moncton Wildcats

Player

- Michel Brière Memorial Trophy - Most Valuable Player: Mike Hoffman, Saint John Sea Dogs
- Jean Béliveau Trophy - Top Scorer: Sean Couturier, Drummondville Voltigeurs
- Guy Lafleur Trophy - Playoff MVP : Gabriel Bourque, Moncton Wildcats
- Jacques Plante Memorial Trophy - Jake Allen, Drummondville Voltigeurs
- Guy Carbonneau Trophy - Best Defensive Forward: Gabriel Dumont, Drummondville Voltiguers
- Emile Bouchard Trophy - Defenceman of the Year: David Savard, Moncton Wildcats
- Kevin Lowe Trophy - Best Defensive Defenceman: David Savard, Moncton Wildcats
- Mike Bossy Trophy - Brandon Gormley, Moncton Wildcats
- RDS Cup - Rookie of the Year: Petr Straka, Rimouski Océanic
- Michel Bergeron Trophy - Offensive Rookie of the Year: Petr Straka, Rimouski Océanic
- Raymond Lagacé Trophy - Defensive Rookie of the Year: Robin Gusse, Chicoutimi Saguenéens
- Frank J. Selke Memorial Trophy - Most sportsmanlike player: Mike Hoffman, Saint John Sea Dogs
- QMJHL Humanitarian of the Year - Humanitarian of the Year: Nick MacNeil, Cape Breton Screaming Eagles
- Marcel Robert Trophy - Best Scholastic Player: Dominic Jalbert, Chicoutimi Saguenéens
- Paul Dumont Trophy - Personality of the Year: Joël Chouinard, Victoriaville Tigres

Executive

- Ron Lapointe Trophy - Coach of the Year: Gerard Gallant, Saint John Sea Dogs
- Maurice Filion Trophy - General Manager of the Year: Dominic Ricard, Drummondville Voltigeurs
- John Horman Trophy - Executive of the Year: Kent Hudson, P.E.I. Rocket
- Jean Sawyer Trophy - Marketing Director of the Year: Vicky Côté, Drummondville Voltigeurs

== See also ==
- 2010 Memorial Cup
- List of QMJHL seasons
- 2009–10 OHL season
- 2009–10 WHL season
- 2009 NHL entry draft
- 2009 in ice hockey
- 2010 in ice hockey

Preceded by 2008–09 QMJHL season	QMJHL seasons	Succeeded by 2010–11 QMJHL season
