= Ostapchuk =

Ostapchuk (Ukrainian: Остапчук) is a surname. Notable people with the surname include:

- Nadzeya Ostapchuk (born 1980), Belarusian shot putter
- Sergei Ostapchuk (1990–2011), Belarusian ice hockey player
- Yuliya Ostapchuk (born 1989), Ukrainian freestyle wrestler
- Zack Ostapchuk (born 2003), Canadian ice hockey player
