= Philippe Cornet =

Canadian ice hockey player (born 1990)

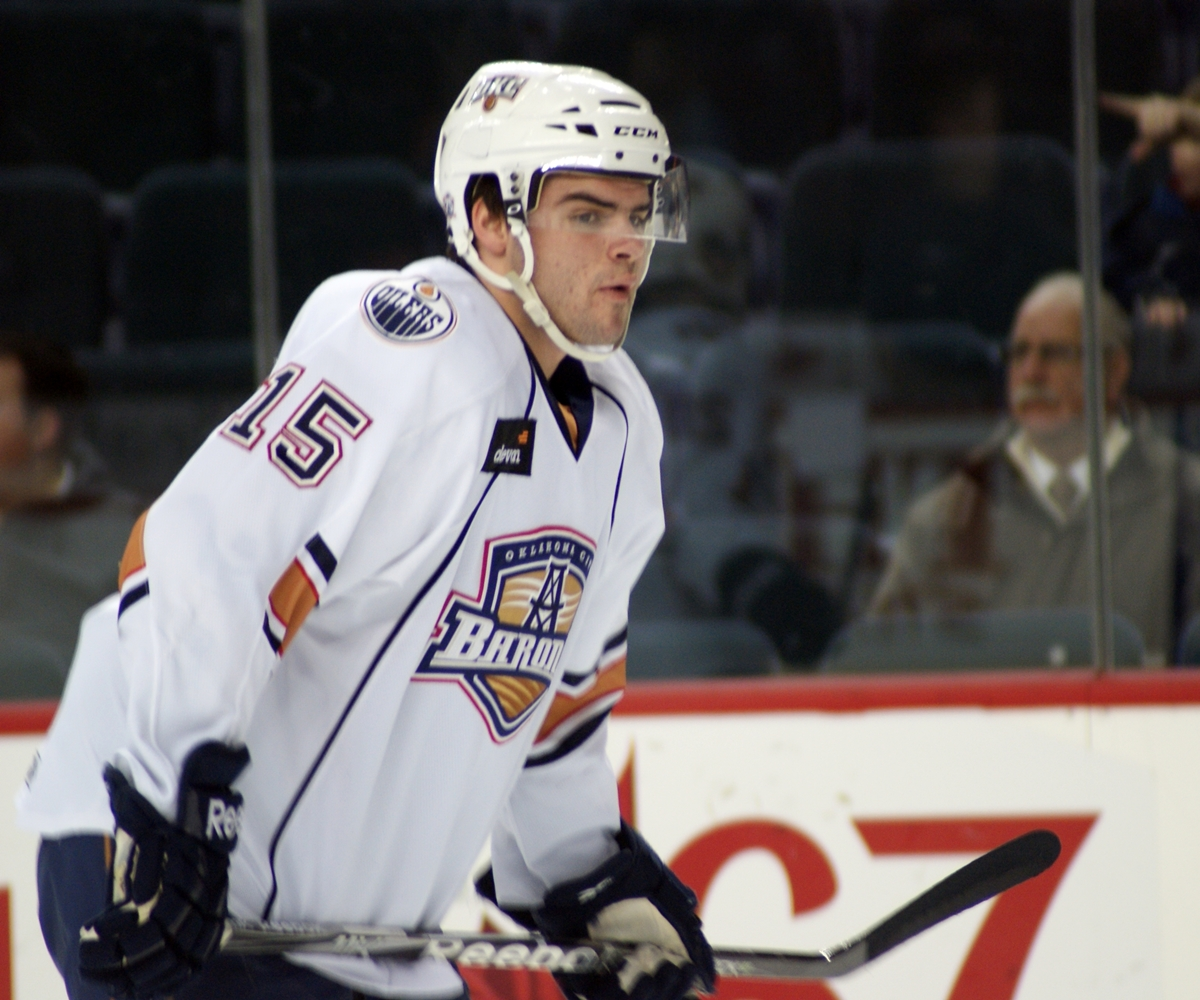
- Born: March 28, 1990 (age 36) Val-Senneville, Quebec, Canada
- Height: 6 ft 0 in (183 cm)
- Weight: 196 lb (89 kg; 14 st 0 lb)
- Position: Left wing
- Shoots: Left
- EL team Former teams: Corona Brașov; Edmonton Oilers; Stavanger Oilers; HPK; Kassel Huskies; Bayreuth Tigers
- NHL draft: 133rd overall, 2008; Edmonton Oilers
- Playing career: 2010–present

Philippe Cornet (born March 28, 1990) is a Canadian professional ice hockey player. Cornet was selected by the Edmonton Oilers in the fifth round (133rd overall) of the 2008 NHL entry draft.

== Playing career ==
As a youth, Cornet played in the 2003 Quebec International Pee-Wee Hockey Tournament with the Val'd-Or Foreurs minor ice hockey team.

Before turning professional, Cornet played major junior hockey in the Quebec Major Junior Hockey League with Rimouski Oceanic and the Rouyn-Noranda Huskies.

On May 4, 2010, the Edmonton Oilers signed Cornet to a three-year entry-level contract.

During the 2011–12 season, Cornet made his NHL debut on January 31, 2012, skating for the Oilers in a 3-2 home game win over the Colorado Avalanche. On just his second shift, he earned an assist on a Jordan Eberle goal.

On August 7, 2013, Cornet was signed as a free agent to a one-year AHL contract with the San Antonio Rampage. He attended NHL affiliate, the Florida Panthers training camp before returning to the Rampage to start the 2013–14 season. After only 4 games with the Rampage, Cornet was reassigned to the ECHL's Cincinnati Cyclones. On November 22, 2013, he returned to the AHL after the Rampage traded Cornet to the Charlotte Checkers in exchange for Adam Brace.

On August 18, 2014, Cornet agreed to a one-year AHL contract as a free agent with the Hershey Bears.

On October 4, 2015, after going un-signed over the summer in North America, he signed as a free agent with Norwegian club, the Stavanger Oilers of the GET-ligaen. Cornet scored 23 goals and assisted on 22 others in 50 games en route to winning the Norwegian national championship.

On April 30, 2016, he signed a contract with HPK of the Finnish top-flight Liiga.

== Career statistics ==
			Regular season					Playoffs
Season	Team	League	GP	G	A	Pts	PIM	GP	G	A	Pts	PIM
2006–07	Rimouski Oceanic	QMJHL	46	7	14	21	8	—	—	—	—	—
2007–08	Rimouski Oceanic	QMJHL	61	23	26	49	24	9	3	3	6	6
2008–09	Rimouski Oceanic	QMJHL	63	29	48	77	34	13	4	11	15	14
2009–10	Rouyn-Noranda Huskies	QMJHL	65	28	49	77	32	11	5	6	11	6
2010–11	Oklahoma City Barons	AHL	60	7	16	23	8	—	—	—	—	—
2011–12	Oklahoma City Barons	AHL	67	24	13	37	26	14	2	5	7	2
2011–12	Edmonton Oilers	NHL	2	0	1	1	0	—	—	—	—	—
2012–13	Stockton Thunder	ECHL	18	9	14	23	2	—	—	—	—	—
2012–13	Oklahoma City Barons	AHL	46	15	18	33	18	17	2	7	9	0
2013–14	San Antonio Rampage	AHL	4	0	1	1	0	—	—	—	—	—
2013–14	Cincinnati Cyclones	ECHL	3	0	0	0	0	—	—	—	—	—
2013–14	Charlotte Checkers	AHL	58	13	15	28	16	—	—	—	—	—
2014–15	Hershey Bears	AHL	55	9	13	22	17	5	0	0	0	0
2015–16	Stavanger Oilers	GET	33	17	17	34	78	17	6	5	11	16
2016–17	HPK	Liiga	30	12	4	16	8	—	—	—	—	—
2017–18	Stavanger Oilers	GET	18	9	11	20	49	5	1	1	2	28
2018–19	HPK	Liiga	44	12	12	24	47	15	0	2	2	2
2019–20	HPK	Liiga	51	11	16	27	41	—	—	—	—	—
2020–21	Kassel Huskies	DEL2	28	23	14	37	10	11	5	7	12	6
2021–22	HPK	Liiga	46	4	6	10	29	2	0	0	0	0
2022–23	Bayreuth Tigers	DEL2	36	6	15	21	12	12	9	3	12	22
NHL totals			2	0	1	1	0	—	—	—	—	—

== Awards and honours ==
Award	Year
World U-17 Hockey Challenge Gold Medal with Team Quebec	2006
