= Tomáš Kubalík =

Czech ice hockey player

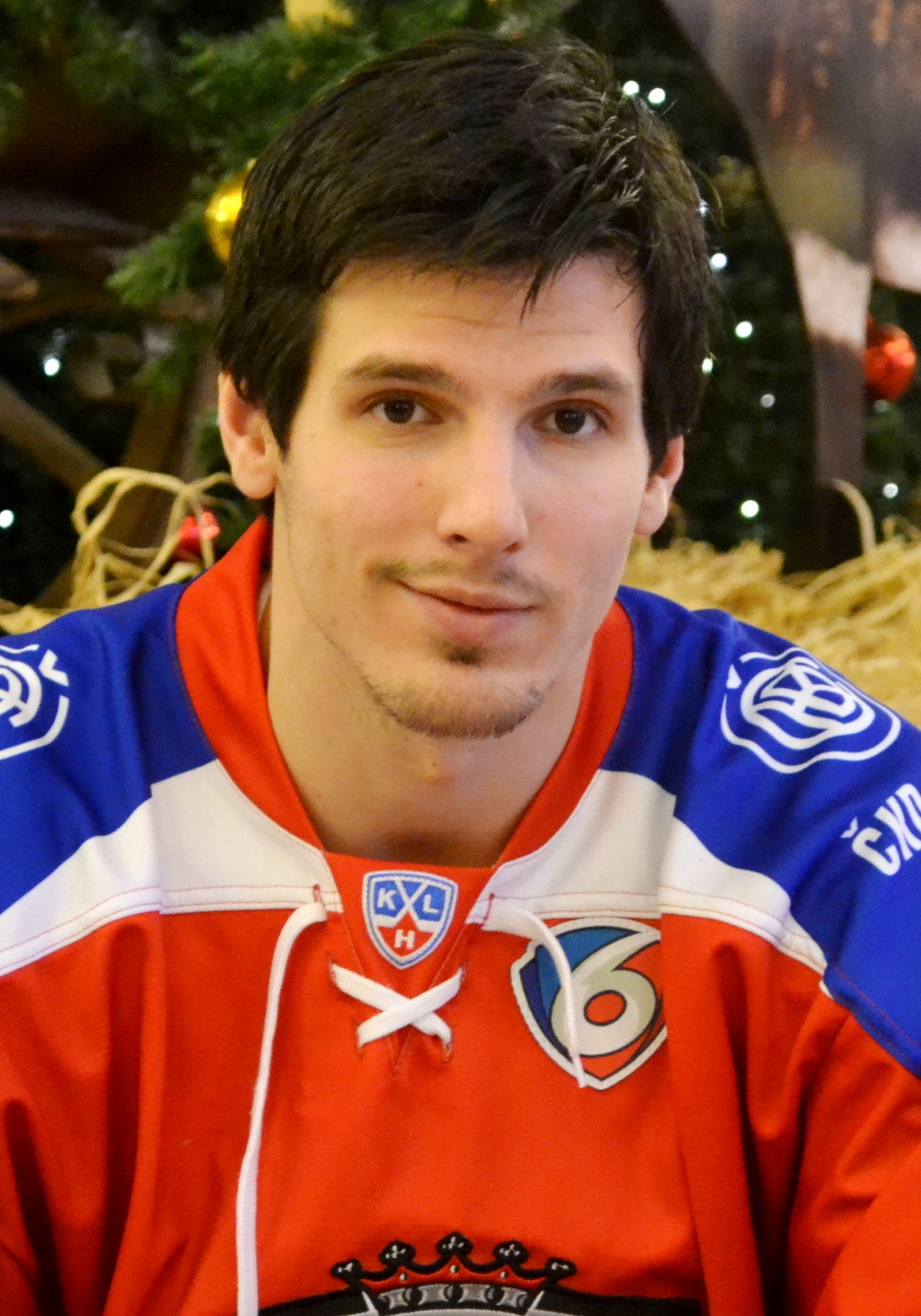
- Born: May 1, 1990 (age 36) Plzeň, Czechoslovakia
- Height: 6 ft 2 in (188 cm)
- Weight: 212 lb (96 kg; 15 st 2 lb)
- Position: Right wing
- Shoots: Right
- team Former teams: Free Agent; HC Plzeň; Columbus Blue Jackets; HC Lev Praha; KalPa; ERC Ingolstadt; HC Slovan Bratislava; Vaasan Sport; HC Dukla Jihlava
- NHL draft: 135th overall, 2008; Columbus Blue Jackets
- Playing career: 2006–present

Tomáš Kubalík (born May 1, 1990) is a Czech professional ice hockey forward who is currently an unrestricted free agent. He is the older brother to Dominik Kubalik who also plays professionally.

== Playing career ==
As a youth, Kubalik played in the 2003 Quebec International Pee-Wee Hockey Tournament with a team from Chomutov. He later played with HC Plzeň 1929, before graduating to play three seasons with the men's team in the professional Czech Extraliga. He was selected by the Columbus Blue Jackets in the 5th round (135th overall) of the 2008 NHL entry draft. He made his NHL debut with the Blue Jackets in the tail end of the 2010–11 season, finishing with 2 assists in 4 games.

During the following 2011–12 season, Kubalik scored his first NHL goal on January 13, 2012, against Jason LaBarbera of the Phoenix Coyotes.

On March 10, 2013, Kubalik was traded from Columbus to the Winnipeg Jets in exchange for Spencer Machacek.

On June 7, 2013, Kubalik left his short tenure with the Blue Jackets organization and returned to the Czech Republic to sign for the Kontinental Hockey League club, HC Lev Praha on a one-year deal.

After a one season in Finland with KalPa of the Liiga, Kubalik left as a free agent to sign his third consecutive one-year deal in a new league, in agreeing to terms with German club, ERC Ingolstadt of the DEL on May 4, 2015.

== Career statistics ==
=== Regular season and playoffs ===
			Regular season					Playoffs
Season	Team	League	GP	G	A	Pts	PIM	GP	G	A	Pts	PIM
2006–07	HC Plzeň	ELH	23	1	0	1	18	—	—	—	—	—
2007–08	HC Plzeň	ELH	20	2	1	3	8	1	0	0	0	0
2008–09	HC Plzeň	ELH	32	1	1	2	64	17	1	0	1	8
2009–10	Victoriaville Tigres	QMJHL	58	33	42	75	95	16	4	10	14	8
2010–11	Springfield Falcons	AHL	76	24	29	53	43	—	—	—	—	—
2010–11	Columbus Blue Jackets	NHL	4	0	2	2	0	—	—	—	—	—
2011–12	Springfield Falcons	AHL	50	11	12	23	42	—	—	—	—	—
2011–12	Columbus Blue Jackets	NHL	8	1	1	2	6	—	—	—	—	—
2012–13	Springfield Falcons	AHL	54	14	6	20	50	—	—	—	—	—
2012–13	St. John's IceCaps	AHL	10	0	3	3	10	—	—	—	—	—
2013–14	HC Lev Praha	KHL	11	2	1	3	6	8	0	0	0	4
2014–15	KalPa	Liiga	48	4	15	19	30	6	0	2	2	2
2015–16	ERC Ingolstadt	DEL	47	14	13	27	40	2	0	0	0	0
2016–17	HC Slovan Bratislava	KHL	18	1	3	4	6	—	—	—	—	—
2016–17	Sport	Liiga	19	1	5	6	6	—	—	—	—	—
2017–18	HC Dukla Jihlava	ELH	32	5	7	12	14	—	—	—	—	—
2017–18	HC Plzeň	ELH	6	1	0	1	4	5	0	2	2	29
NHL totals			12	1	3	4	6	—	—	—	—	—

Medal record

Representing Czech Republic

Ice hockey

IIHF World U18 Championships
Gold medal – first place	2008 Poland	Division I Group A

=== International ===
Year	Team	Event	Result	GP	G	A	Pts	PIM
2007	Czech Republic	WJC18	9th	6	1	1	2	4
2008	Czech Republic	WJC18-D1	11th	5	6	6	12	8
2009	Czech Republic	WJC	6th	6	0	2	2	4
2010	Czech Republic	WJC	7th	6	4	5	9	8
Junior totals				23	11	14	25	24
