= Nicola Riopel =

Canadian ice hockey player

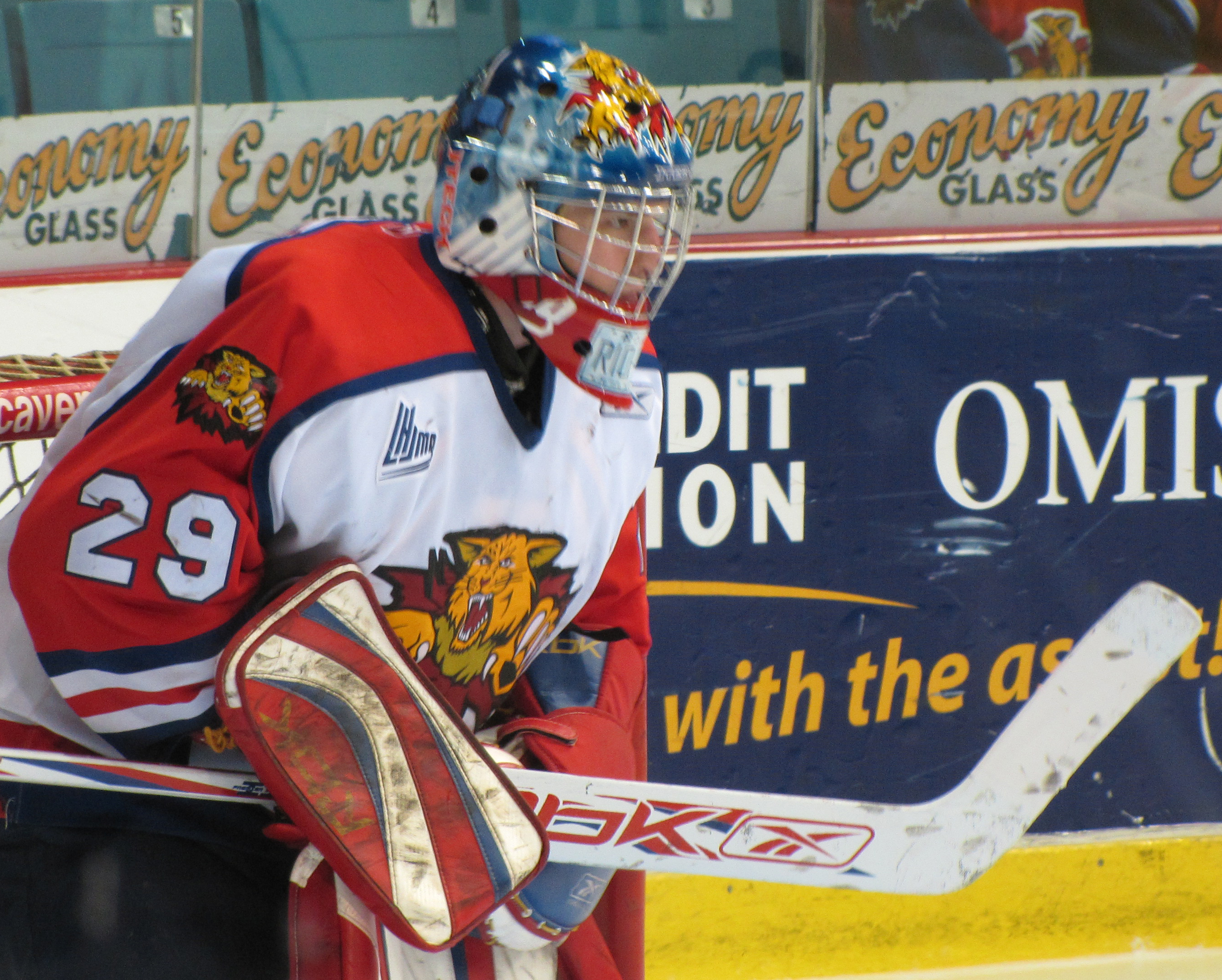
- Riopel with the Moncton Wildcats in 2009
- Born: February 20, 1989 (age 37) Saint-Pie, Quebec, Canada
- Height: 6 ft 0 in (183 cm)
- Weight: 190 lb (86 kg; 13 st 8 lb)
- Position: Goaltender
- Caught: Left
- Played for: Adirondack Phantoms; Dundee Stars; Frederikshavn White Hawks; Dragons de Rouen; Syracuse Crunch
- NHL draft: 142nd overall, 2009; Philadelphia Flyers
- Playing career: 2009–2018

Nicola Riopel (born February 20, 1989) is a Canadian former professional ice hockey goaltender who played in the American Hockey League (AHL).

== Playing career ==
Riopel began his major junior career with the Moncton Wildcats in 2005–06, appearing in 5 games. He shared starts with the older Jhase Sniderman in his rookie season in 2006–07 before taking the starting position in 2007–08. In his third season with the Wildcats, Riopel emerged with a record-setting and award-winning campaign. Along with his 43 wins, which helped Moncton to an Atlantic Division title, and .930 save percentage, he established a league record with a 2.01 goals against average, far surpassing Martin Houle of the Cape Breton Screaming Eagles previous record of 2.32, set in 2003–04. Riopel was awarded the Jacques Plante Memorial Trophy for having the lowest GAA in the league and the Michel Brière Memorial Trophy as player of the year. He was selected in the 5th round, 142nd overall of the 2009 NHL Entry Draft, by the Philadelphia Flyers.

Riopel began the 2009–2010 season by claiming a spot in training camp with the Flyers' top AHL affiliate, the Adirondack Phantoms. After posting a 4-6-0 record with a 3.35 GAA and a 0.893 save percentage in back-up duty to Johan Backlund, Riopel was loaned back to his Junior club, the Moncton Wildcats, on December 17, 2009.

After attending both the Philadelphia Flyers' training camp and then the Adirondack Phantoms' training camp, Riopel was assigned to the Greenville Road Warriors of the ECHL. However, after performing extremely well in "AA" hockey, he was recalled after Greg Gilbert was released as head coach of the Phantoms to replace Brian Stewart. Since, he has become the starting netminder for the Glens Falls team after an injury to starter Johan Backlund.

After Flyers Stanley Cup goaltender Michael Leighton was waived and sent to the Adirondack Phantoms on January 4, 2011, the logjam at the position saw Riopel returned to Greenville.

Since Riopel wasn't signed to an entry-level contract by June 1, 2011, the Flyers no longer hold his NHL rights. He signed a contract with the ECHL's Greenville Road Warriors in the summer of 2011.

On August 9, 2012, Riopel signed a deal with the Dundee Stars of the EIHL in Scotland. Riopel played two further seasons abroad with Frederikshavn White Hawks in Denmark and in the French Ligue Magnus with the Dragons de Rouen.

On September 16, 2015, Riopel returned to North America in signing a one-year ECHL contract with the Rapid City Rush. He was winless in two games to start the 2015–16 season before he was released by the Rush. On November 6, 2015, he remained in the league after he was signed by the Norfolk Admirals. Riopel appeared in 32 games with the Admirals, and after a string of impressive performances was signed by the Syracuse Crunch to end the year on March 4, 2016.

Although failing to feature in a game with the Crunch, in the off-season on August 22, 2016, Riopel was signed to a one-year deal to remain in the AHL with the Syracuse Crunch.

In the 2017–18 season, on January 20, 2018, Riopel appeared in his first AHL game in seven seasons. He replaced Connor Ingram at the start of third period against the Utica Comets. He faced 2 shots, turning aside both in a 4–2 loss to the Comets. On February 1, 2018, he was traded by the Crunch along with Ty Loney to the Bakersfield Condors in exchange for NHL contracted goaltender Eddie Pasquale. He was assigned to the Condors ECHL affiliate, the Wichita Thunder.

On July 29, 2018, Riopel announced his retirement after playing in nine professional seasons.

== Career statistics ==
=== Regular season and playoffs ===
			Regular season									Playoffs
Season	Team	League	GP	W	L	T/OT	MIN	GA	SO	GAA	SV%	GP	W	L	MIN	GA	SO	GAA	SV%
2006–07	Moncton Wildcats	QMJHL	37	17	12	0	1914	107	1	3.35	.894	4	1	3	185	16	0	5.19	.842
2007–08	Moncton Wildcats	QMJHL	47	15	29	10	2662	135	1	3.04	.910	—	—	—	—	—	—	—	—
2008–09	Moncton Wildcats	QMJHL	59	43	15	4	3487	117	5	2.01	.931	10	5	5	620	21	2	2.03	.936
2009–10	Adirondack Phantoms	AHL	10	4	6	0	573	32	0	3.35	.893	—	—	—	—	—	—	—	—
2009–10	Moncton Wildcats	QMJHL	25	19	5	0	1455	50	3	2.06	.918	21	16	4	1291	46	3	2.14	.930
2010–11	Greenville Road Warriors	ECHL	38	24	12	2	2301	107	2	2.79	.906	7	4	3	436	18	0	2.48	.910
2010–11	Adirondack Phantoms	AHL	11	3	7	0	591	35	1	3.55	.874	—	—	—	—	—	—	—	—
2011–12	Greenville Road Warriors	ECHL	25	14	9	2	1453	74	0	3.06	.905	2	0	2	119	8	0	4.03	.900
2012–13	Dundee Stars	EIHL	51	19	28	3	3012	174	0	3.47	.912	—	—	—	—	—	—	—	—
2013–14	Frederikshavn White Hawks	DEN	26	—	—	—	—	—	—	2.92	.902	—	—	—	—	—	—	—	—
2014–15	Dragons de Rouen	FRA	17	—	—	—	—	—	—	2.51	.903	3	—	—	—	—	—	2.11	.920
2015–16	Rapid City Rush	ECHL	2	0	2	0	119	8	0	4.03	.843	—	—	—	—	—	—	—	—
2015–16	Norfolk Admirals	ECHL	32	13	15	1	1779	76	0	2.56	.924	—	—	—	—	—	—	—	—
2016–17	Kalamazoo Wings	ECHL	32	18	12	1	1841	96	1	3.13	.899	4	2	2	239	16	0	4.01	.849
2017–18	Adirondack Thunder	ECHL	19	9	9	0	1044	57	1	3.28	.897	—	—	—	—	—	—	—	—
2017–18	Syracuse Crunch	AHL	1	0	0	0	19	0	0	0.00	1.000	—	—	—	—	—	—	—	—
2017–18	Wichita Thunder	ECHL	19	6	4	5	1026	50	0	2.92	.907	—	—	—	—	—	—	—	—
AHL totals			22	7	13	0	1183	67	1	3.40	.884	—	—	—	—	—	—	—	—

== Awards and honours ==
Award	Year
QMJHL
Jacques Plante Memorial Trophy	2009
Michel Brière Memorial Trophy	2009

== Records ==
- QMJHL league record; lowest goals against average, single-season - 2.01 in 2008–09

Awards and achievements
Preceded by Bobby Nadeau	Jacques Plante Memorial Trophy; 2009	Succeeded by Jake Allen
Preceded by Francis Paré	Michel Brière Memorial Trophy; 2009	Succeeded by Mike Hoffman
