= Ryan Kavanagh =

Canadian ice hockey player (born 1991)

- Born: February 12, 1991 (age 34); Montreal, Quebec, Canada
- Height: 5 ft 8 in (173 cm)
- Weight: 180 lb (82 kg; 12 st 12 lb)
- Position: Defence
- Shot: Right
- Played for: EC Red Bull Salzburg; EHC München; Reading Royals; Tønsberg Vikings; Braehead Clan; HC Pustertal Wölfe
- NHL draft: Undrafted
- Playing career: 2011–2016

Ryan Kavanagh (born February 12, 1991) is a Canadian former ice hockey defenceman.

== Career ==
Kavanagh played junior hockey in the Quebec Major Junior Hockey League for the Rimouski Océanic and the Shawinigan Cataractes between 2008 and 2011. He began his professional career in 2011 in the Erste Bank Eishockey Liga in Austria for EC Red Bull Salzburg and then moved to Germany's Deutsche Eishockey Liga to play for EHC München. He returned to North America in 2013 and signed for the Reading Royals of the ECHL but the tenure only lasted 19 games before moving to the Tønsberg Vikings in Norway's GET-ligaen in the tail-end of their season. In 2014, Kavanagh moved the United Kingdom's Elite Ice Hockey League and signed for Glasgow-based team the Braehead Clan. In 2016, he moved to Italy and signed for HC Pustertal Wölfe before retiring.

== Career statistics ==
=== Regular season and playoffs ===
| | | | Regular season | | | | | Playoffs |
| Season | Team | League | GP | G | A | Pts | PIM | GP | G | A | Pts | PIM |
|---|---|---|---|---|---|---|---|---|---|---|---|---|
| 2007–08 | Lac-St-Louis Lions | QMAAA | 40 | 14 | 29 | 43 | 30 | 10 | 2 | 6 | 8 | 10 |
| 2008–09 | Rimouski Océanic | QMJHL | 38 | 4 | 12 | 19 | 18 | 9 | 0 | 1 | 1 | 0 |
| 2009–10 | Rimouski Océanic | QMJHL | 58 | 18 | 39 | 57 | 26 | 12 | 7 | 6 | 13 | 6 |
| 2010–11 | Rimouski Océanic | QMJHL | 40 | 11 | 31 | 42 | 8 | — | — | — | — | — |
| 2010–11 | Shawinigan Cataractes | QMJHL | 28 | 6 | 22 | 28 | 10 | 10 | 3 | 3 | 6 | 4 |
| 2011–12 | EC Red Bull Salzburg | EBEL | 33 | 7 | 11 | 18 | 14 | 6 | 0 | 2 | 2 | 2 |
| 2012–13 | EHC München | DEL | 41 | 4 | 8 | 12 | 10 | — | — | — | — | — |
| EBEL totals | | | 33 | 7 | 11 | 18 | 14 | 6 | 0 | 2 | 2 | 2 |

=== International ===
| Year | Team | Comp | GP | G | A | Pts | PIM |
|---|---|---|---|---|---|---|---|
| 2007 | Quebec | U17 | 5 | 1 | 4 | 5 | 2 |
| Junior I'ntl totals | | | 5 | 1 | 4 | 5 | 2 |

== Awards and honours ==
| Award | Year |
|---|---|
QMJHL
| First Team All-Star | 2011 |
