= Charles Landry (ice hockey) =

Canadian ice hockey player

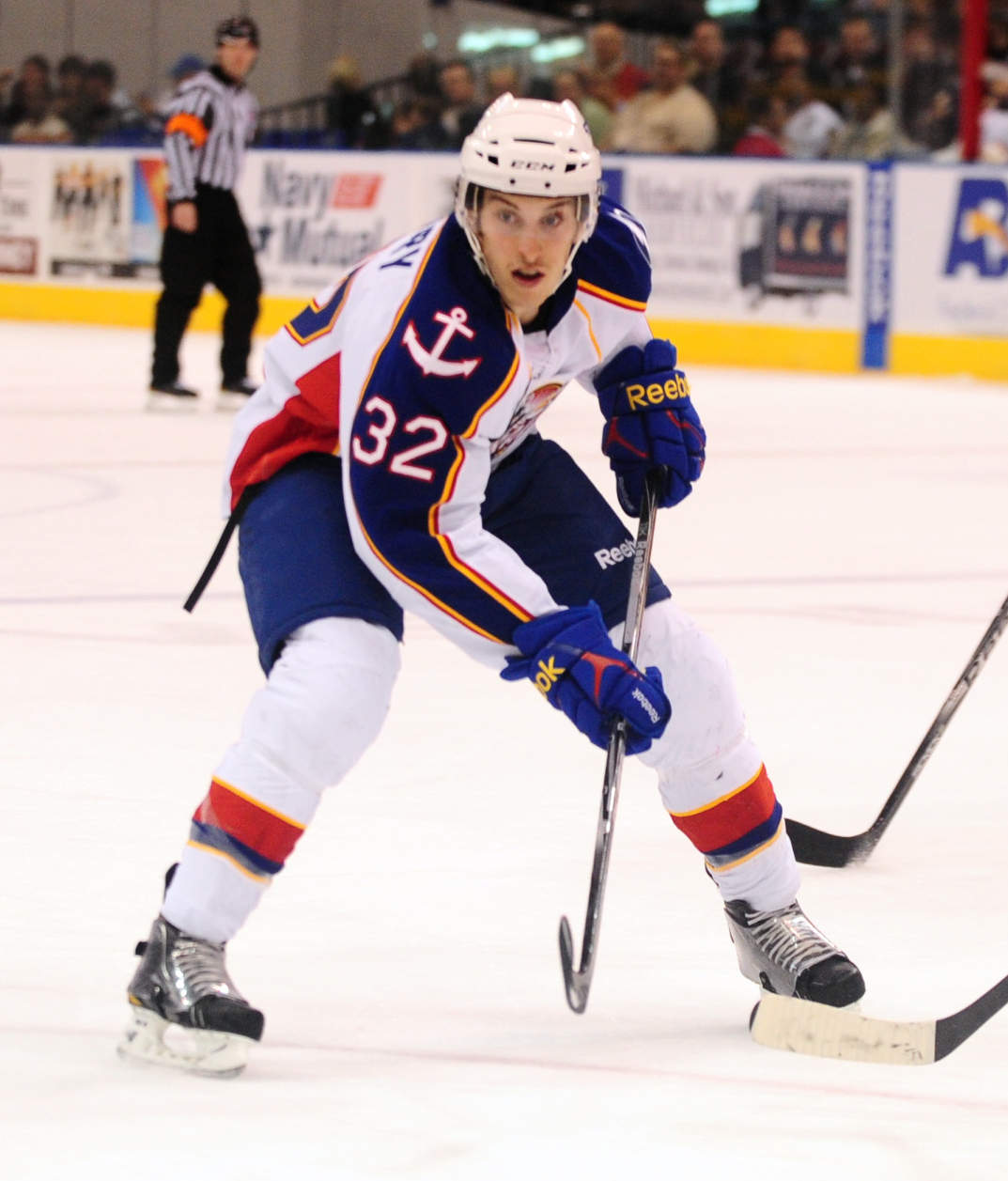
- Landry with the Norfolk Admirals in 2011
- Born: June 3, 1991 (age 35) Longueuil, Quebec, Canada
- Height: 5 ft 11 in (180 cm)
- Weight: 187 lb (85 kg; 13 st 5 lb)
- Position: Defence
- Shot: Right
- Played for: Norfolk Admirals; Syracuse Crunch; Nottingham Panthers; Brest Albatros Hockey
- NHL draft: Undrafted
- Playing career: 2011–2016

Charles Landry (born June 3, 1991) is a Canadian former professional ice hockey defenceman. He last played professionally with the Brest Albatros of the Ligue Magnus, and currently plays for the Cornwall Prowlers of the Eastern Ontario Senior Hockey League (EOSHL).

== Playing career ==
Landry played four seasons (2007 – 2011) of major junior hockey in the Quebec Major Junior Hockey League (QMJHL), registering 96 points and 159 penalty minutes in 234 games played.

On September 15, 2010, the Tampa Bay Lightning signed Landry as a free agent to a three-year entry-level contract, but he did not play his first professional game until after the conclusion of his 2010–11 QMJHL season with the Lightning's American Hockey League affiliate, the Norfolk Admirals.

On July 15, 2014, the Nottingham Panthers of the UK's EIHL announced that Landry would be joining them for their upcoming campaign on a one-year deal. He then went on to join the Brest Albatros of France's Ligue Magnus for the 2015-16 season.

After leaving Brest, he spent two seasons with the Saint-Gabriel Loups of the Ligue Hockey Senior Richelieu before joining the Cornwall Prowlers of the EOSHL in 2019.

== Career statistics ==
			Regular season					Playoffs
Season	Team	League	GP	G	A	Pts	PIM	GP	G	A	Pts	PIM
2007–08	Drummondville Voltigeurs	QMJHL	61	5	8	13	47	—	—	—	—	—
2008–09	Drummondville Voltigeurs	QMJHL	48	0	13	13	31	19	2	2	4	8
2009–10	Drummondville Voltigeurs	QMJHL	68	6	24	30	41	14	3	2	5	10
2010–11	Montreal Juniors	QMJHL	57	11	29	40	30	10	1	3	4	12
2010–11	Norfolk Admirals	AHL	—	—	—	—	—	1	0	0	0	0
2011–12	Norfolk Admirals	AHL	23	0	6	6	19	—	—	—	—	—
2011–12	Florida Everblades	ECHL	36	2	7	9	12	11	1	2	3	5
2012–13	Syracuse Crunch	AHL	9	0	0	0	4	—	—	—	—	—
2012–13	Florida Everblades	ECHL	51	4	12	16	33	13	0	1	1	11
2013–14	Syracuse Crunch	AHL	34	1	2	3	17	—	—	—	—	—
2013–14	Florida Everblades	ECHL	18	0	3	3	33	—	—	—	—	—
2014-15	Nottingham Panthers	EIHL	48	6	10	16	23	2	0	0	0	2
2015-16	Brest Albatros	FRA	26	1	12	13	16	5	0	1	1	8
AHL totals			66	1	8	9	40	1	0	0	0	0
