= Gabriel Beaupré =

Canadian ice hockey player (born 1992)

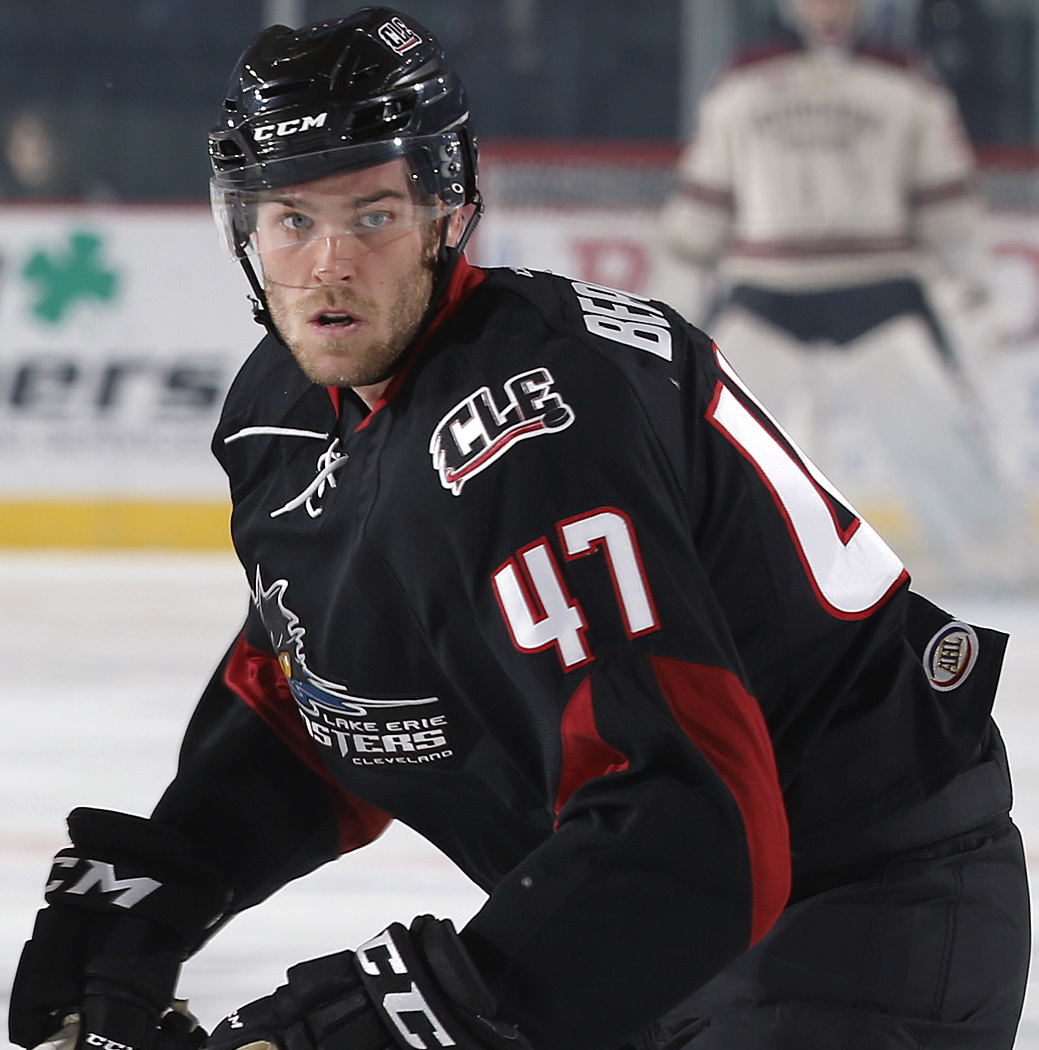
- Beaupré with the Lake Erie Monsters in 2014
- Born: November 23, 1992 (age 33) Lévis, Quebec, Canada
- Height: 6 ft 2 in (188 cm)
- Weight: 196 lb (89 kg; 14 st 0 lb)
- Position: Defence
- Shot: Left
- Played for: Lake Erie Monsters; San Antonio Rampage
- NHL draft: 153rd overall, 2011; Colorado Avalanche
- Playing career: 2012–2017

Gabriel Beaupré (born November 23, 1992) is a Canadian former professional ice hockey defenceman. He was previously a prospect under contract to the Colorado Avalanche of the National Hockey League (NHL).

== Playing career ==
Beaupré as a Quebec native, played midget hockey with the Lévis Commandeurs. He began his major junior career in the Quebec Major Junior Hockey League with the Val-d'Or Foreurs in the 2008–09 season. As a stay-at-home defenceman, he appeared in 53 games as a rookie, contributing with just 3 assists. Developing in size throughout his career with the Foreurs, Beaupré improved his points totals in each of his four full seasons with the club. He was drafted 153rd overall in the 2011 NHL entry draft by the Colorado Avalanche.

After attending his first NHL training camp with the Colorado Avalanche prior to the 2011–12 season, Beaupré was returned to junior to continue with Val-d'Or. He posted a career high 6 goals and 21 points, however could not help prevent Val-d'Or from a third successive first round exit.

In the following 2012–13 season, Beaupré began his fifth season with the Foreurs. After just 4 games, Beaupré opted to turn professional and although without a contract from the Avalanche, was assigned to secondary affiliate, the Denver Cutthroats of the Central Hockey League. Scoring 8 points in 28 games with the Cutthroats, Beaupré was elevated to the Avalanche's primary affiliate, the Lake Erie Monsters of the AHL on December 26, 2012. He made his AHL debut that night in a 7-6 overtime defeat to the Rochester Americans. In his 11th game he registered his first goal, in a 4-1 victory over the Abbotsford Heat on January 31, 2013. He remained with the Monsters for the duration of the season, to finish with 5 points in 43 games.

On March 22, 2013, Beaupré was rewarded in his role as a defensive defenceman from his first professional season, with a three-year entry-level contract from the Colorado Avalanche. In the following 2013–14 season, Beaupré established himself as a mainstay on the Monsters blueline, featuring in 65 games for 8 points.

After the 2015–16 season, in which he primarily spent with third tier affiliate, the Fort Wayne Komets of the ECHL, Beaupré completed his entry-level deal and was not offered a contract to remain with the Avalanche. On July 18, 2016, he opted to remain with the Komets, signing a one-year ECHL contract as a free agent. In the 2016–17 season, Beaupré was limited to just 11 games before he suffered a season ending concussion on November 13, 2016. While on his road to recovery it was announced that Beaupré would not return to the Komets on March 22, 2017.

== Career statistics ==
=== Regular season and playoffs ===
			Regular season					Playoffs
Season	Team	League	GP	G	A	Pts	PIM	GP	G	A	Pts	PIM
2007–08	Lévis Commandeurs	QMAAA	45	2	6	8	52	3	0	0	0	6
2008–09	Val-d'Or Foreurs	QMJHL	52	0	3	3	48	—	—	—	—	—
2009–10	Val-d'Or Foreurs	QMJHL	56	2	5	7	94	6	1	1	2	8
2010–11	Val-d'Or Foreurs	QMJHL	66	3	15	18	73	4	0	1	1	4
2011–12	Val-d'Or Foreurs	QMJHL	62	6	15	21	102	4	0	0	0	6
2012–13	Val-d'Or Foreurs	QMJHL	4	0	0	0	6	—	—	—	—	—
2012–13	Denver Cutthroats	CHL	28	3	5	8	23	—	—	—	—	—
2012–13	Lake Erie Monsters	AHL	43	1	4	5	67	—	—	—	—	—
2013–14	Lake Erie Monsters	AHL	65	3	5	8	23	—	—	—	—	—
2014–15	Lake Erie Monsters	AHL	35	1	3	4	23	—	—	—	—	—
2014–15	Fort Wayne Komets	ECHL	11	2	5	7	18	—	—	—	—	—
2015–16	Fort Wayne Komets	ECHL	52	2	5	7	87	15	0	2	2	22
2015–16	San Antonio Rampage	AHL	1	0	0	0	6	—	—	—	—	—
2016–17	Fort Wayne Komets	ECHL	11	2	0	2	14	—	—	—	—	—
AHL totals			144	5	12	17	119	—	—	—	—	—

=== International ===
Year	Team	Event	Result	GP	G	A	Pts	PIM
2009	Canada Quebec	U17	5th	5	0	0	0	0
Junior totals				5	0	0	0	0
