= Adam Polášek =

Czech ice hockey player (born 1991)

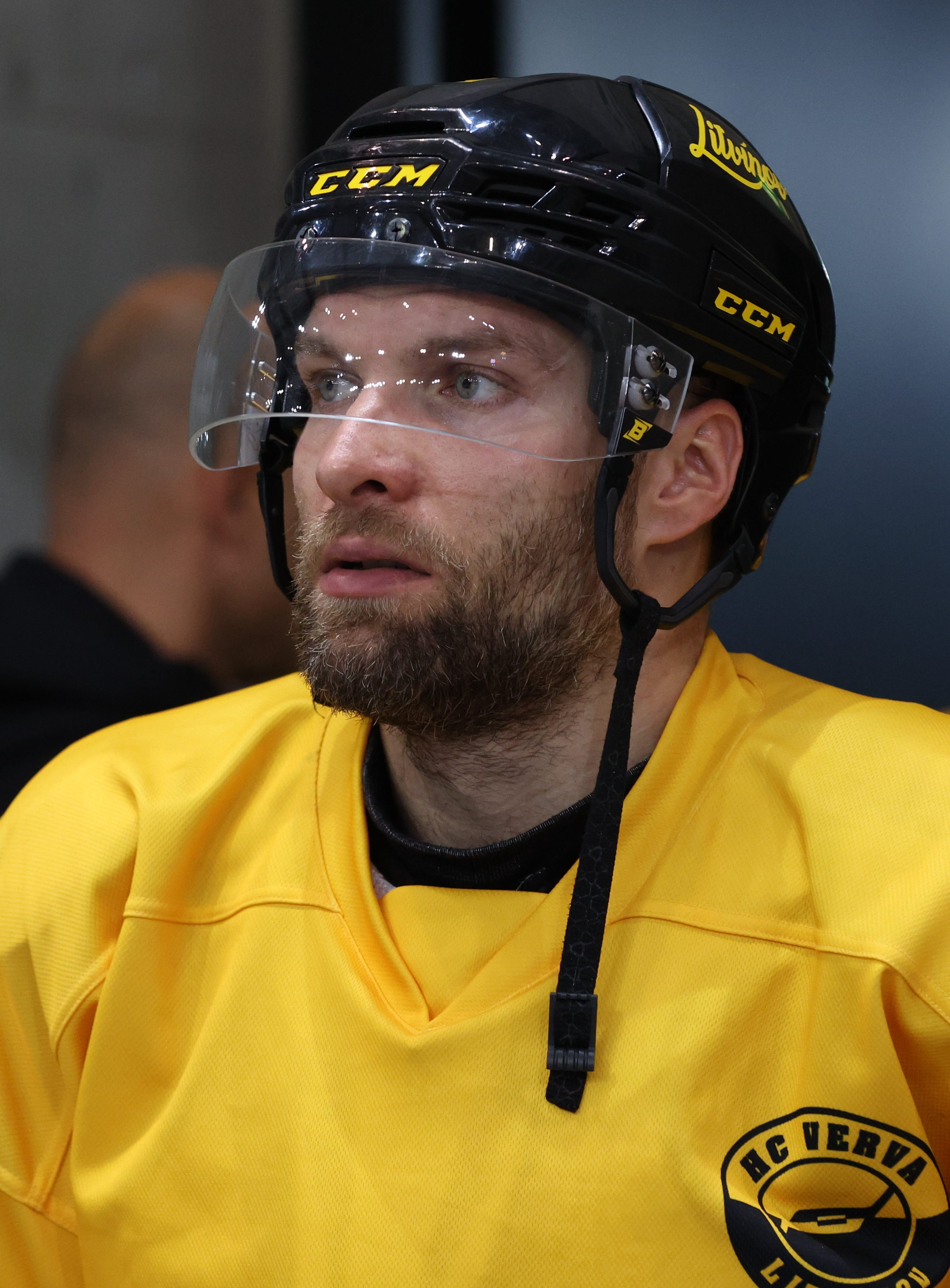
- Polášek, 2024
- Born: July 12, 1991 (age 35) Ostrava, Czechoslovakia
- Height: 6 ft 3 in (191 cm)
- Weight: 200 lb (91 kg; 14 st 4 lb)
- Position: Defence
- Shoots: Left
- ELH team Former teams: HC Sparta Praha; Chicago Wolves; Utica Comets; Sibir Novosibirsk; HC Sochi; Neftekhimik Nizhnekamsk
- National team: Czech Republic
- NHL draft: 145th overall, 2010; Vancouver Canucks
- Playing career: 2009–present

Adam Polášek (born July 12, 1991) is a Czech ice hockey defenceman currently playing for HC Sparta Praha of the Czech Extraliga (ELH). He was selected by the Vancouver Canucks in the 5th round, 145th overall of the 2010 NHL entry draft.

== Playing career ==
Polášek went through the full training system of Vítkovice, and played the Czech junior leagues for the team, including the Junior Extraliga.

He signed his first professional contract with the Vancouver Canucks on April 7, 2011. Following the pre-season training camp, Polášek was assigned to start the 2011–12 season in the AHL with the Chicago Wolves

During the final year of his contract within the Canucks organization, Polášek opted to terminate his contract with Vancouver on December 25, 2013. He returned to his native Czech Republic and signed a contract with Sparta Praha of the Czech Extraliga on December 31, 2013. In 2016, Polášek signed with Sibir Novosibirsk of Kontinental Hockey League (KHL). On October 7, 2017, he joined Sochi of KHL. Polášek played out the season with Sochi, posting 7 points in 34 games.

As a free agent, Polášek opted to continue in the KHL, agreeing to a one-year deal with HC Neftekhimik Nizhnekamsk on May 2, 2018. In the 2018–19 season, Polášek contributed with a KHL career high 7 goals, adding 26 points in 58 games.

On 15 July 2019, Polášek returned to the Czech Republic as a free agent, returning to former club HC Sparta Praha on a one-year contract.

== Career statistics ==
=== Regular season and playoffs ===
			Regular season					Playoffs
Season	Team	League	GP	G	A	Pts	PIM	GP	G	A	Pts	PIM
2005–06	HC Vítkovice Steel	CZE U18	17	1	0	1	2	—	—	—	—	—
2006–07	HC Vítkovice Steel	CZE U18	43	6	13	19	83	9	0	1	1	12
2006–07	HC Vítkovice Steel	CZE U20	1	0	0	0	2	—	—	—	—	—
2007–08	HC Vítkovice Steel	CZE U18	18	3	2	5	50	2	0	0	0	0
2007–08	HC Vítkovice Steel	CZE U20	23	0	3	3	16	2	0	1	1	0
2008–09	HC Vítkovice Steel	CZE U20	38	7	13	20	68	9	0	9	9	18
2009–10	P.E.I. Rocket	QMJHL	66	13	28	41	91	5	0	0	0	2
2010–11	P.E.I. Rocket	QMJHL	61	7	32	39	59	5	0	0	0	8
2011–12	Chicago Wolves	AHL	46	1	8	9	27	—	—	—	—	—
2012–13	Kalamazoo Wings	ECHL	34	4	4	8	37	—	—	—	—	—
2012–13	Chicago Wolves	AHL	24	1	7	8	27	—	—	—	—	—
2013–14	Utica Comets	AHL	2	0	0	0	2	—	—	—	—	—
2013–14	Kalamazoo Wings	ECHL	16	1	1	2	16	—	—	—	—	—
2013–14	HC Sparta Praha	ELH	16	2	4	6	14	10	2	2	4	12
2013–14	HC Stadion Litoměřice	CZE.2	2	0	1	1	0	—	—	—	—	—
2014–15	HC Sparta Praha	ELH	52	10	26	36	58	10	1	6	7	14
2015–16	HC Sparta Praha	ELH	49	9	13	22	34	17	3	9	12	10
2016–17	Sibir Novosibirsk	KHL	60	6	22	28	32	—	—	—	—	—
2017–18	Sibir Novosibirsk	KHL	11	1	1	2	14	—	—	—	—	—
2017–18	HC Sochi	KHL	34	2	5	7	37	5	1	2	3	2
2018–19	Neftekhimik Nizhnekamsk	KHL	58	7	19	26	49	—	—	—	—	—
2019–20	HC Sparta Praha	ELH	34	3	12	15	30	—	—	—	—	—
2019–20	Tappara	Liiga	23	4	8	12	16	—	—	—	—	—
2020–21	HC Vítkovice Ridera	ELH	15	4	3	7	14	—	—	—	—	—
2020–21	HC Sparta Praha	ELH	30	3	10	13	22	11	2	1	3	6
2021–22	HC Sparta Praha	ELH	49	5	8	13	24	16	3	3	6	12
ELH totals			245	36	76	112	196	64	11	21	32	54
KHL totals			163	16	47	63	132	5	1	2	3	2

=== International ===
Year	Team	Event	Result	GP	G	A	Pts	PIM
2008	Czech Republic	IH18	5th	4	1
2009	Czech Republic	WJC18	6th	6	2	3	5	10
2018	Czech Republic	OG	4th	6	0	0	0	2
2018	Czech Republic	WC	7th	7	0	2	2	2
Senior totals				13	0	2	2	4

== Awards and honours ==
Award	Year
QMJHL
All-Rookie Team	2009–10
CHL All-Rookie Team	2009–10
