= Joël Chouinard =

Canadian ice hockey player (born 1990)

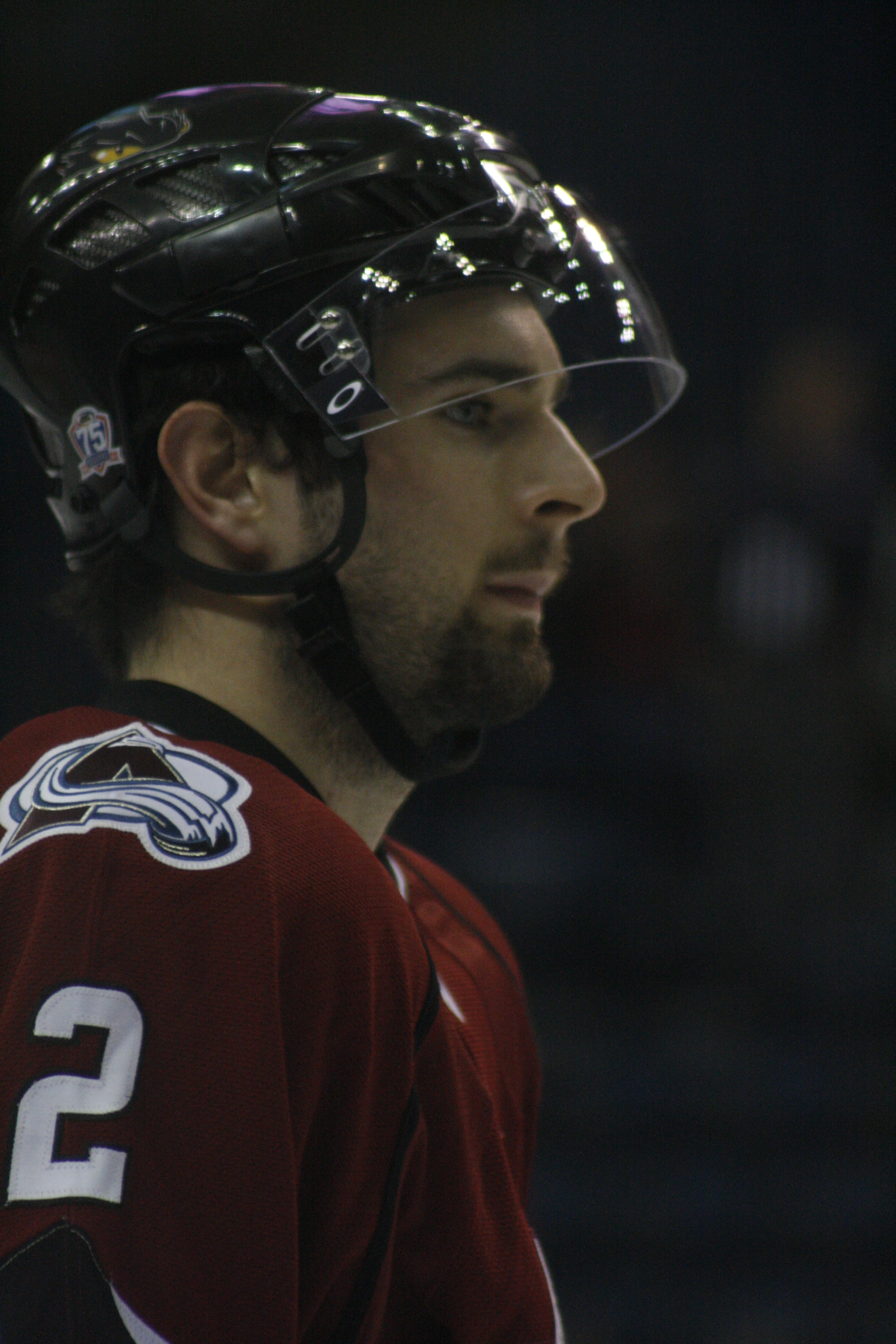
- Chouinard with the Lake Erie Monsters in 2011
- Born: April 8, 1990 (age 36) Longueuil, Quebec, Canada
- Height: 6 ft 1 in (185 cm)
- Weight: 186 lb (84 kg; 13 st 4 lb)
- Position: Defence
- Shot: Left
- Played for: Lake Erie Monsters; Hamilton Bulldogs; Grand Rapids Griffins; Iowa Wild; Chicago Wolves
- NHL draft: 167th overall, 2008; Colorado Avalanche
- Playing career: 2010–2019

Joël Chouinard (born April 8, 1990) is a Canadian former professional ice hockey defenceman who played in the American Hockey League (AHL).

== Playing career ==
Chouinard played junior hockey in the Quebec Major Junior Hockey League with the Victoriaville Tigres. He was drafted 167th overall in the 2008 NHL entry draft by the Colorado Avalanche. In the 2009–10 season, after leading the QMJHL with 23 goals scored among defensemen and helping the Tigres to an equal franchise best season of 46 wins, he was selected to the QMJHL First All-Star Team and named as a finalist for the Emile Bouchard Trophy as the league's best defenseman. Off the ice Joel was awarded the Paul Dumont Trophy as the Leagues personality of the year.

Chouinard was signed by the Colorado Avalanche to a three-year entry-level contract on May 26, 2010. After attending the Avalanche's 2010 training camp, he was then assigned and began his professional career with their affiliate, the Lake Erie Monsters of the American Hockey League in the 2010–11 season.

With his first two professional seasons hampered by injury, Chouinard again had a disrupted pre-season and began the 2012–13 season familiarly on the sidelines. Upon returning to health, Chouinard was reassigned by the Avalanche from the Monsters to second tier affiliation, the Denver Cutthroats of the Central Hockey League. In 42 games with the Cutthroats, he placed second amongst blueliners in scoring with 6 goals and 20 points.

At the conclusion of his contract Chouinard's right's were relinquished with the Avalanche, and on August 20, 2013, he was signed as a free agent to a one-year AHL deal with the Hamilton Bulldogs. In the 2013-14 season with the Bulldogs, Chouinard appeared in a career high 67 games with 2 goals and 9 points.

On September 11, 2014, Chouinard signed a one-year contract with the Toledo Walleye of the ECHL. On January 5, 2015, the Grand Rapids Griffins signed Chouinard to a professional try out. Prior to signing a professional try out with the Griffins, Chouinard led all defenceman in scoring, recording five goals and 15 assists in 31 games with Toledo this season.

On September 2, 2015, the Toledo Walleye re-signed Chouinard to a one-year contract extension. During the 2014–15 season, he recorded five goals and 15 assists in 34 games with the Walleye, and eight assists in 19 postseason games. He also appeared in 29 games at the AHL level, with two games for the Grand Rapids Griffins, and 27 for the Iowa Wild, where he recorded five goals and ten assists.

On February 12, 2016, the Grand Rapids Griffins signed Chouinard to a professional try out. Prior to signing a professional try out with the Griffins, Chouinard led all Toledo Walleye defenceman in scoring, recording six goals and 19 assists in 38 games. On March 4, 2016, the Griffins signed Chouinard to a standard player's contract. He scored the game-winning goal in his Griffins debut, a 4–3 win at Iowa on February 13. On March 10, Chouinard was assigned to the Toledo Walleye of the ECHL. Since joining the Griffins on a professional try out, he has recorded one goal and two assists in eight games. On March 30, Chouinard was recalled by the Griffins.

As a free agent in the off-season, Chouinard opted to continue in the ECHL, leaving the Walleye to sign with reigning Champions, the Allen Americans on August 2, 2016.

Chouinard played three seasons with the Americans, featuring as Captain, for the last two before opting to end his 9-year professional career following the 2018–19 season.

== Career statistics ==
			Regular season					Playoffs
Season	Team	League	GP	G	A	Pts	PIM	GP	G	A	Pts	PIM
2006–07	Victoriaville Tigres	QMJHL	23	3	3	6	20	6	0	1	1	0
2007–08	Victoriaville Tigres	QMJHL	69	7	28	35	95	6	2	0	2	4
2008–09	Victoriaville Tigres	QMJHL	64	12	23	35	65	4	0	1	1	6
2009–10	Victoriaville Tigres	QMJHL	65	23	45	68	56	16	3	10	13	6
2010–11	Lake Erie Monsters	AHL	35	8	9	17	14	2	0	0	0	0
2011–12	Lake Erie Monsters	AHL	53	0	10	10	43	—	—	—	—	—
2012–13	Denver Cutthroats	CHL	42	6	14	20	28	5	0	0	0	8
2012–13	Lake Erie Monsters	AHL	10	0	0	0	11	—	—	—	—	—
2013–14	Hamilton Bulldogs	AHL	67	2	7	9	33	—	—	—	—	—
2014–15	Toledo Walleye	ECHL	34	5	15	20	25	19	0	8	8	4
2014–15	Grand Rapids Griffins	AHL	2	0	0	0	0	—	—	—	—	—
2014–15	Iowa Wild	AHL	27	5	5	10	12	—	—	—	—	—
2015–16	Toledo Walleye	ECHL	49	7	21	28	34	7	1	0	1	6
2015–16	Chicago Wolves	AHL	1	0	0	0	2	—	—	—	—	—
2015–16	Grand Rapids Griffins	AHL	9	1	3	4	0	—	—	—	—	—
2016–17	Allen Americans	ECHL	72	10	34	44	36	11	3	4	7	4
2017–18	Allen Americans	ECHL	72	12	39	51	34	7	1	3	4	2
2018–19	Allen Americans	ECHL	61	6	22	28	38	—	—	—	—	—
AHL totals			204	16	34	50	115	2	0	0	0	0

== Awards and honours ==
Award	Year
QMJHL
First All-Star Team	2009–10
Paul Dumont Trophy	2009–10
