= Kelsey Tessier =

Canadian ice hockey player

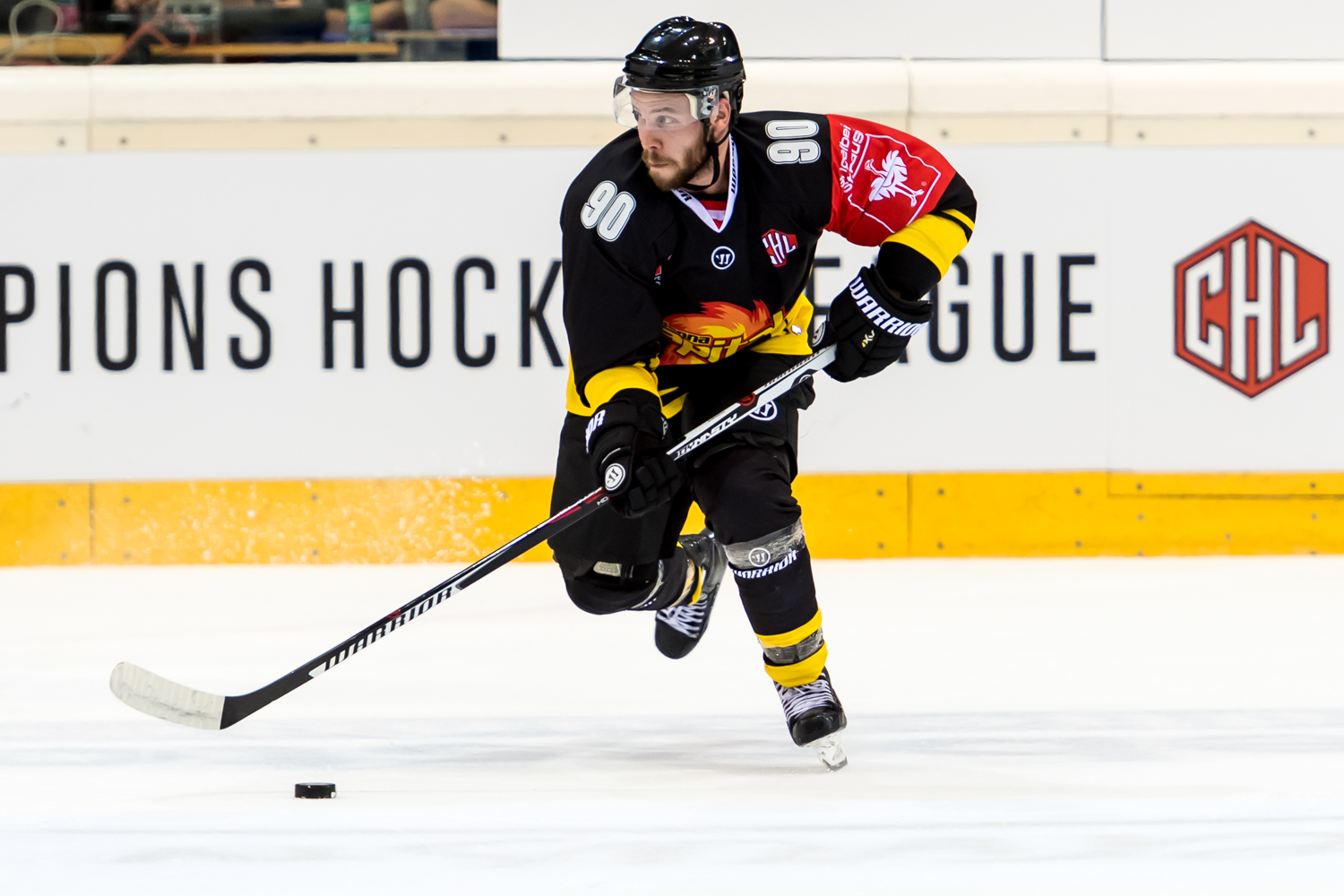
- Born: January 16, 1990 (age 36) Fredericton, New Brunswick, Canada
- Height: 5 ft 9 in (175 cm)
- Weight: 177 lb (80 kg; 12 st 9 lb)
- Position: Centre
- Shot: Right
- Played for: Connecticut Whale; Sport; Rögle BK; Vienna Capitals; Dragons de Rouen
- NHL draft: 110th overall, 2008; Colorado Avalanche
- Playing career: 2010–2023

Kelsey Tessier (born January 16, 1990) is a Canadian former professional ice hockey player who last played with Dragons de Rouen of the Ligue Magnus.

== Playing career ==
Tessier was selected by the Colorado Avalanche in the 4th round (110th overall) of the 2008 NHL entry draft. Prior to turning professional, Tessier played major junior hockey in the Quebec Major Junior Hockey League primarily with the Quebec Remparts before he was traded in his final year to the Moncton Wildcats.

Despite not being tendered with a contract by the Avalanche, Tessier turned professional and was invited to the New York Rangers training camp on September 8, 2010. While impressing during the pre-season Tessier was sent to AHL affiliate, the Hartford Wolf Pack and was later signed to a one-year AHL contract.

In his first professional season in 2010–11, Tessier finished second among rookies in posting 10 goals and 28 points. On July 6, 2011, Tessier was re-signed by the Connecticut Whale for a second season. Tessier repeated his rookie performance with the Whale in 2011–12, scoring 30 points in 75 games. In the 2012 Calder cup playoffs, Tessier finished with 5 points, to place third among the team.

On September 17, 2012, Tessier was re-signed to his third consecutive one-year contract with the Whale. Despite a slow start to the 2012–13 season, Tessier still produced 11 goals and 13 assists from primarily a depth role in 71 games.

As the longest tenured Whale player, Tessier initially agreed to return to the renamed Wolf Pack for a fourth successive season. On July 15, 2013, Tessier was granted a release from his contract and signed a one-year deal with Swedish club, Rögle BK of the HockeyAllsvenskan. Tessier was attracted by Sporting director Anders Carlsson, who drafted him whilst a part of the Colorado Avalanche scouting department in 2008.

In the 2013–14 season, Tessier quickly established himself amongst Rögle's top offensive players. In 52 games, Tessier scored 42 points to lead the club and finish 6th in overall HockeyAllsvenskan points. With ambition to play at a higher level, Tessier left Rögle and signed a one-year contract with newly promoted Finnish Liiga club, Vaasan Sport, on April 30, 2014. Tessier played five scoreless games with Sport, before opting to return to the Allsvenskan with Karlskrona HK for the remainder of the season.

On July 14, 2015, Tessier signed a one-year contract in a return to newly promoted Rögle BK of the SHL. In the 2015–16 season, Tessier was reduced to a limited role in 10 games with Rögle before he mutually agreed to leave the club and sign with IF Björklöven of the Allsvenskan for the remainder of the season on December 30, 2015.

As a free agent in the off-season, Tessier moved to Austria, agreeing to an optional two-year deal with the Vienna Capitals of the EBEL on July 13, 2016.

Tessier played 9 seasons abroad in Europe, completing his last two seasons with French club, Dragons de Rouen of the Ligue Magnus, before opting to retire from professional hockey on May 23, 2023.

== Career statistics ==
			Regular season					Playoffs
Season	Team	League	GP	G	A	Pts	PIM	GP	G	A	Pts	PIM
2006–07	Quebec Remparts	QMJHL	63	23	27	50	40	5	1	5	6	0
2007–08	Quebec Remparts	QMJHL	68	36	45	81	73	11	8	7	15	10
2008–09	Quebec Remparts	QMJHL	64	25	35	60	43	17	9	2	11	21
2009–10	Quebec Remparts	QMJHL	39	12	29	41	21	—	—	—	—	—
2009–10	Moncton Wildcats	QMJHL	15	7	5	12	12	21	14	16	30	14
2010–11	Hartford Wolf Pack/CT Whale	AHL	75	10	18	28	19	6	0	1	1	2
2011–12	Connecticut Whale	AHL	75	12	18	30	20	9	1	4	5	6
2012–13	Connecticut Whale	AHL	71	11	13	24	30	—	—	—	—	—
2013–14	Rögle BK	Allsv	52	15	27	42	48	16	8	1	9	8
2014–15	Vaasan Sport	Liiga	5	0	0	0	4	—	—	—	—	—
2014–15	Karlskrona HK	Allsv	31	8	9	17	14	4	0	2	2	0
2015–16	Rögle BK	SHL	10	2	1	3	0	—	—	—	—	—
2015–16	IF Björklöven	Allsv	17	4	5	9	22	—	—	—	—	—
2016–17	Vienna Capitals	EBEL	54	20	24	44	12	12	6	13	19	2
2017–18	Vienna Capitals	EBEL	44	7	7	14	18	11	5	1	6	6
2018–19	Vienna Capitals	EBEL	52	15	23	38	32	17	4	1	5	4
2019–20	VIK Västerås HK	Allsv	50	11	29	40	22	1	1	1	2	0
2020–21	EC Bad Nauheim	DEL2	49	20	29	49	24	—	—	—	—	—
2021–22	Dragons de Rouen	FRA	43	13	23	36	20	13	1	3	4	12
2022–23	Dragons de Rouen	FRA	44	28	29	57	12	16	6	10	16	33
AHL totals			221	33	49	82	69	15	1	5	6	8
