= Sergei Ostapchuk =

- Born: March 19, 1990 Novopolotsk, Byelorussian SSR, Soviet Union
- Died: September 7, 2011 (aged 21) Yaroslavl, Russia
- Height: 5 ft 10 in (178 cm)
- Weight: 187 lb (85 kg; 13 st 5 lb)
- Position: Right wing
- Shot: Left
- Played for: Lokomotiv Yaroslavl (RSL)/(KHL)
- Playing career: 2007–2011

Sergei Igorevich Ostapchuk (Belarusian: Сяргей Астапчук (Siarhej Astapchuk); March 19, 1990 – September 7, 2011) was an ice hockey player. He was playing with Lokomotiv Yaroslavl in the Kontinental Hockey League (KHL).

Ostapchuk died on September 7, 2011, in the 2011 Lokomotiv Yaroslavl plane crash disaster. The plane was carrying the Lokomotiv hockey team from Yaroslavl to Minsk, the capital of Belarus, where it was to play against Dinamo Minsk in the 2011 season opening game of the KHL.

== Career statistics ==
=== Regular season and playoffs ===
| | | | Regular season | | | | | Playoffs |
| Season | Team | League | GP | G | A | Pts | PIM | GP | G | A | Pts | PIM |
|---|---|---|---|---|---|---|---|---|---|---|---|---|
| 2007–08 | Lokomotiv Yaroslavl | RSL | 3 | 0 | 1 | 1 | 2 | — | — | — | — | — |
| 2008–09 | Rouyn-Noranda Huskies | QMJHL | 61 | 29 | 34 | 63 | 40 | 5 | 1 | 3 | 4 | 20 |
| 2009–10 | Rouyn-Noranda Huskies | QMJHL | 38 | 21 | 16 | 37 | 46 | 11 | 2 | 6 | 8 | 18 |
| 2009–10 | Lokomotiv Yaroslavl | KHL | 8 | 0 | 0 | 0 | 4 | — | — | — | — | — |
| 2010–11 | Lokomotiv Yaroslavl | KHL | 28 | 2 | 1 | 3 | 10 | 7 | 0 | 0 | 0 | 0 |
| RSL totals | | | 3 | 0 | 1 | 1 | 2 | — | — | — | — | — |
| QMJHL totals | | | 99 | 50 | 50 | 100 | 86 | 16 | 3 | 9 | 12 | 38 |
| KHL totals | | | 36 | 2 | 1 | 3 | 14 | 7 | 0 | 0 | 0 | 0 |

== See also ==
- List of ice hockey players who died during their playing career
