= Denis Kindl =

Czech ice hockey player

- Born: August 4, 1992 (age 33) Czech Republic
- Height: 6 ft 0 in (183 cm)
- Weight: 185 lb (84 kg; 13 st 3 lb)
- Position: Centre
- Shoots: Left
- Czech team Former teams: HC Plzeň; HC Karlovy Vary HC Oceláři Třinec
- Playing career: 2009–present

Denis Kindl (born August 4, 1992) is a Czech professional ice hockey player. He is currently playing for HC Skoda Plzeň of the Czech Extraliga.

Kindl made his Czech Extraliga debut playing with HC Oceláři Třinec during the 2014-15 Czech Extraliga season.
