= Viktor Hertzberg =

Swedish ice hockey player

- Born: April 23, 1991 (age 34) Sunne, Sweden
- Height: 6 ft 0 in (183 cm)
- Weight: 181 lb (82 kg; 12 st 13 lb)
- Position: Right wing
- Shoots: Left
- Elitserien team: Timrå IK
- NHL draft: Undrafted
- Playing career: 2011–present

Viktor Hertzberg (born April 23, 1991) is a Swedish professional ice hockey player who is currently playing for Timrå IK in the Elitserien.

Prior to turning professional, Hertzberg played two seasons in the QMJHL.
