= Jakub Culek =

Czech professional ice hockey player

- Born: September 7, 1992 (age 33) Klatovy, Czech Republic
- Height: 6 ft 3 in (191 cm)
- Weight: 200 lb (91 kg; 14 st 4 lb)
- Position: Left wing
- Shoots: Left
- Played for: AHL; Binghamton Senators; ECHL; Elmira Jackals; Evansville Icemen
- NHL draft: 76th overall, 2010; Ottawa Senators
- Playing career: 2012–present

Jakub Culek (born September 7, 1992) is a Czech professional ice hockey player. Culek was selected by the Ottawa Senators in the 3rd round (76th overall) of the 2010 NHL entry draft.
