= Alexander Zalivin =

Russian ice hockey goaltender

- Born: July 15, 1990 (age 36) Moscow, Russian SFSR, Soviet Union
- Height: 6 ft 0 in (183 cm)
- Weight: 196 lb (89 kg; 14 st 0 lb)
- Position: Goalie
- Catches: Left
- Tipsport Liga team Former teams: MHk 32 Liptovský Mikuláš; HC Dynamo Moscow; HC 07 Detva
- Playing career: 2009–present

Alexander Zalivin (born July 15, 1990) is a Russian professional ice hockey goaltender who currently plays for MHk 32 Liptovský Mikuláš of the Tipsport Liga.

Zavalin previously played six games for HC Dynamo Moscow of the Kontinental Hockey League during the 2016–17 season.
