= 2008 NHL entry draft =

2008 North American ice hockey draft

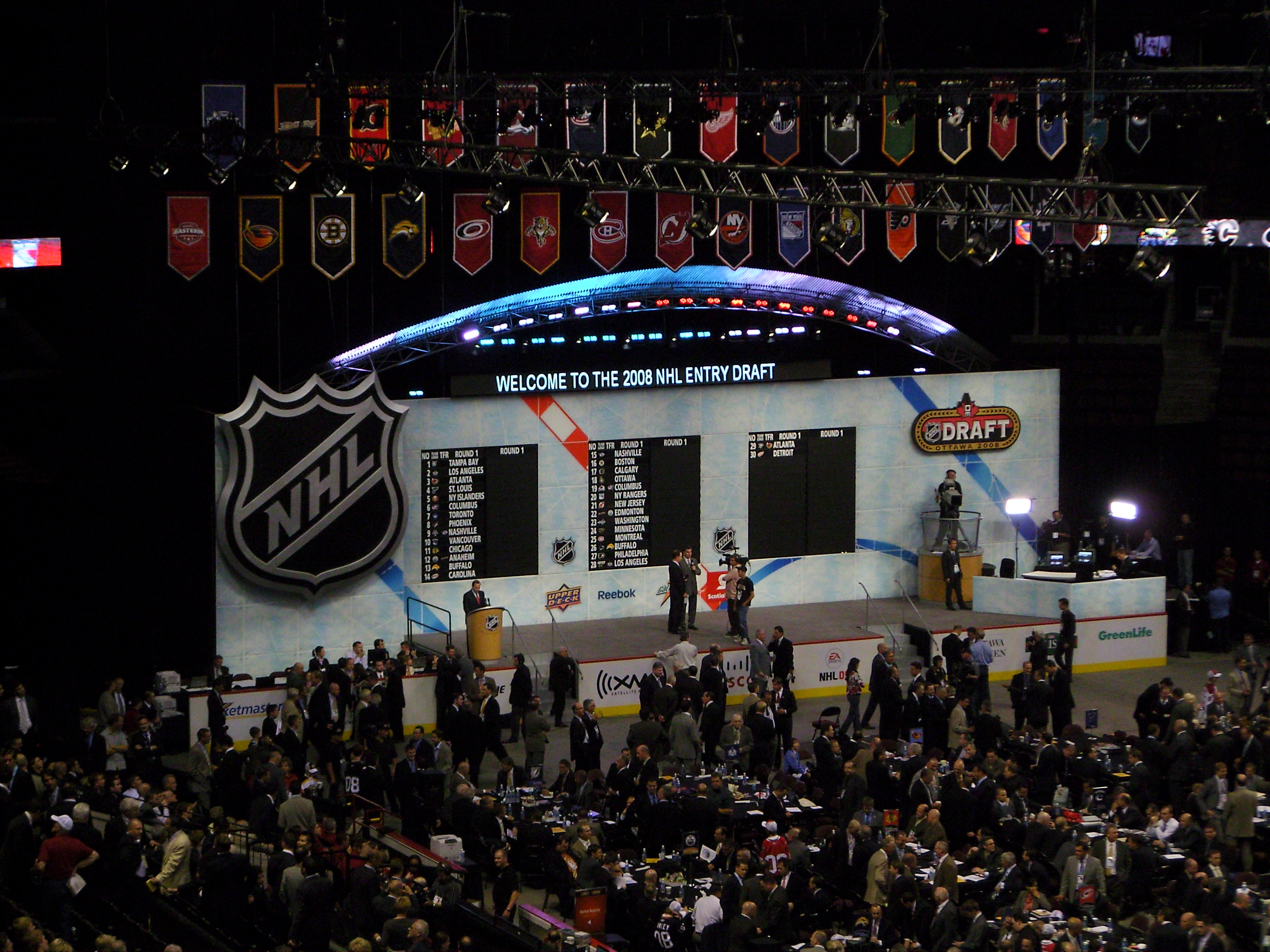
- Scotiabank Place during the draft

General information
- Date: June 20–21, 2008
- Location: Scotiabank Place; Ottawa, Ontario, Canada

Overview
- 211 total selections in 7 rounds
- First selection: (Canada) Steven Stamkos (Tampa Bay Lightning)

The 2008 NHL entry draft was the 46th draft for the National Hockey League. It was hosted by the Ottawa Senators at Scotiabank Place in Ottawa on June 20–21, 2008. The Senators were originally awarded the 2005 NHL entry draft, but because of the lockout, that draft was scaled back significantly from its usual format of being open to the public and having many draft-eligible players in attendance. The actual 2005 drafting was held in Ottawa's Westin Hotel instead of the Corel Centre. As a result of 2005's abridged draft, Ottawa was compensated with the 2008 draft.

As of 2026, there are 15 active NHL players from this draft.

== Draft weekend ==
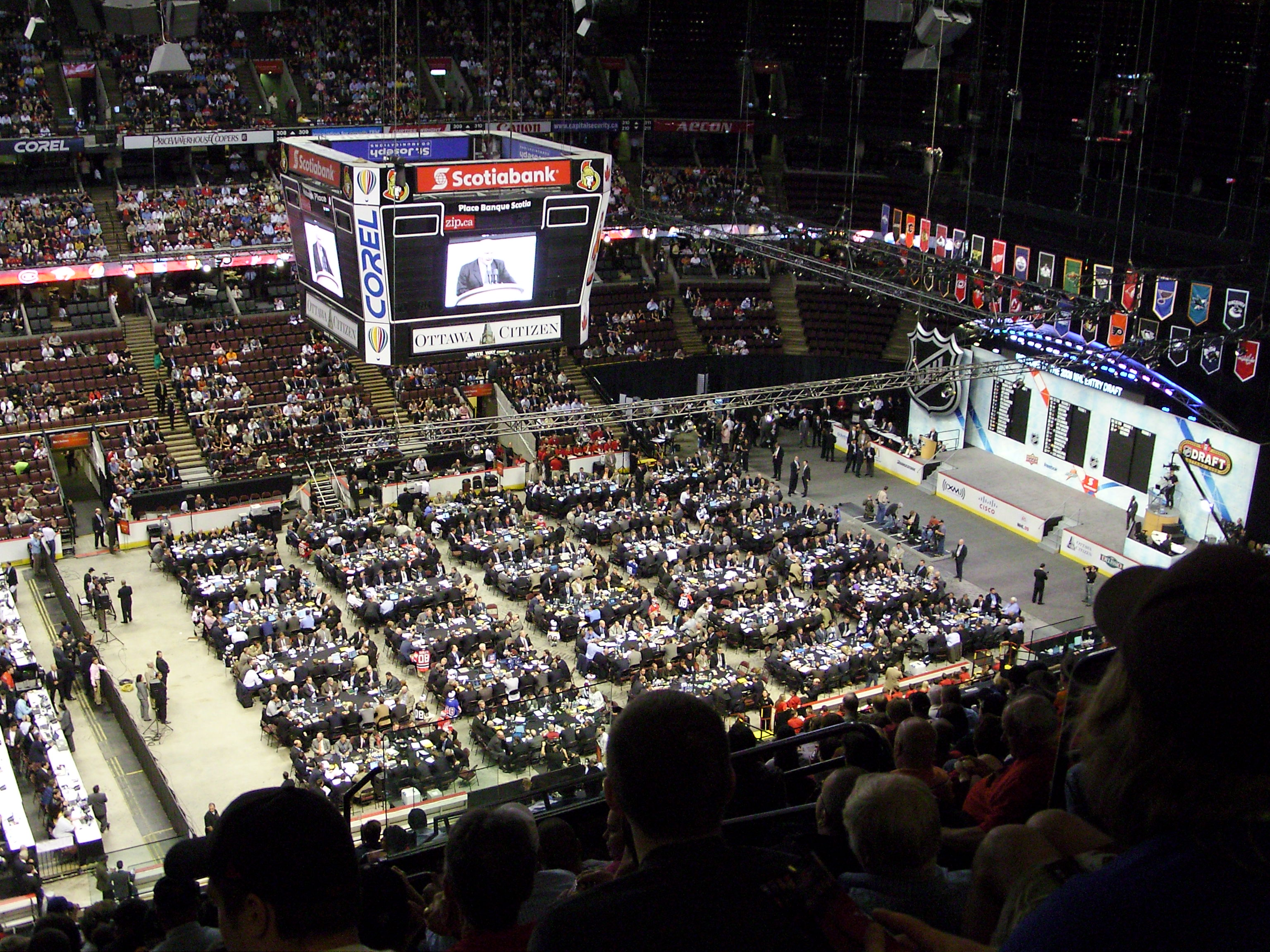
Stage and team tables at Scotiabank Place

The draft was part of a festival of events that Ottawa and the NHL presented at the Scotiabank Place arena. Before the first round and during the later rounds, the patio outside the main doors was the site of the 'Senators Fan Fest', with hockey games and music. Indoors, the NHL presented an exhibit of NHL trophies, including the Stanley Cup. A hockey card and memorabilia sale was also held.

== Draft lottery ==
The 2008 draft lottery was held April 7. The Tampa Bay Lightning retained the first overall selection. There were no changes from the reverse order of finish of the 2007–08 NHL season.

== Final rankings ==
Source: NHL Central Scouting Bureau staff.

Ranking	North American skaters	European skaters
1	(Canada) Steven Stamkos (C)	(Russia) Nikita Filatov (LW)
2	(Canada) Drew Doughty (D)	(Russia) Kirill Petrov (RW)
3	(Canada) Luke Schenn (D)	(Sweden) Anton Gustafsson (C)
4	(United States) Zach Bogosian (D)	(Sweden) Mattias Tedenby (LW)
5	(Canada) Tyler Myers (D)	(Sweden) Erik Karlsson (D)
6	(Canada) Alex Pietrangelo (D)	(Switzerland) Roman Josi (D)
7	(Canada) Kyle Beach (LW)	(Russia) Viktor Tikhonov (RW)
8	(Canada) Zach Boychuk (C)	(Russia) Vyacheslav Voynov (D)
9	(Canada) Cody Hodgson (C)	(Russia) Evgeny Grachev (C)
10	(United States) Colin Wilson (C)	(Russia) Dmitri Kugryshev (RW)

Ranking	North American goalies	European goalies
1	(United States) Tom McCollum	(Sweden) Jacob Markstrom
2	(Canada) Chet Pickard	(Finland) Harri Sateri
3	(Canada) Peter Delmas	(Sweden) Anders Lindback

== Selections by round ==
Club teams are located in North America unless otherwise noted.

= NHL All-Star team ·	= NHL All-Star (Note: Players are identified as an All-Star if they were selected for the All-Star game at any time in their career.) ·	= NHL All-Star and NHL All-Star team ·

=== Round one ===
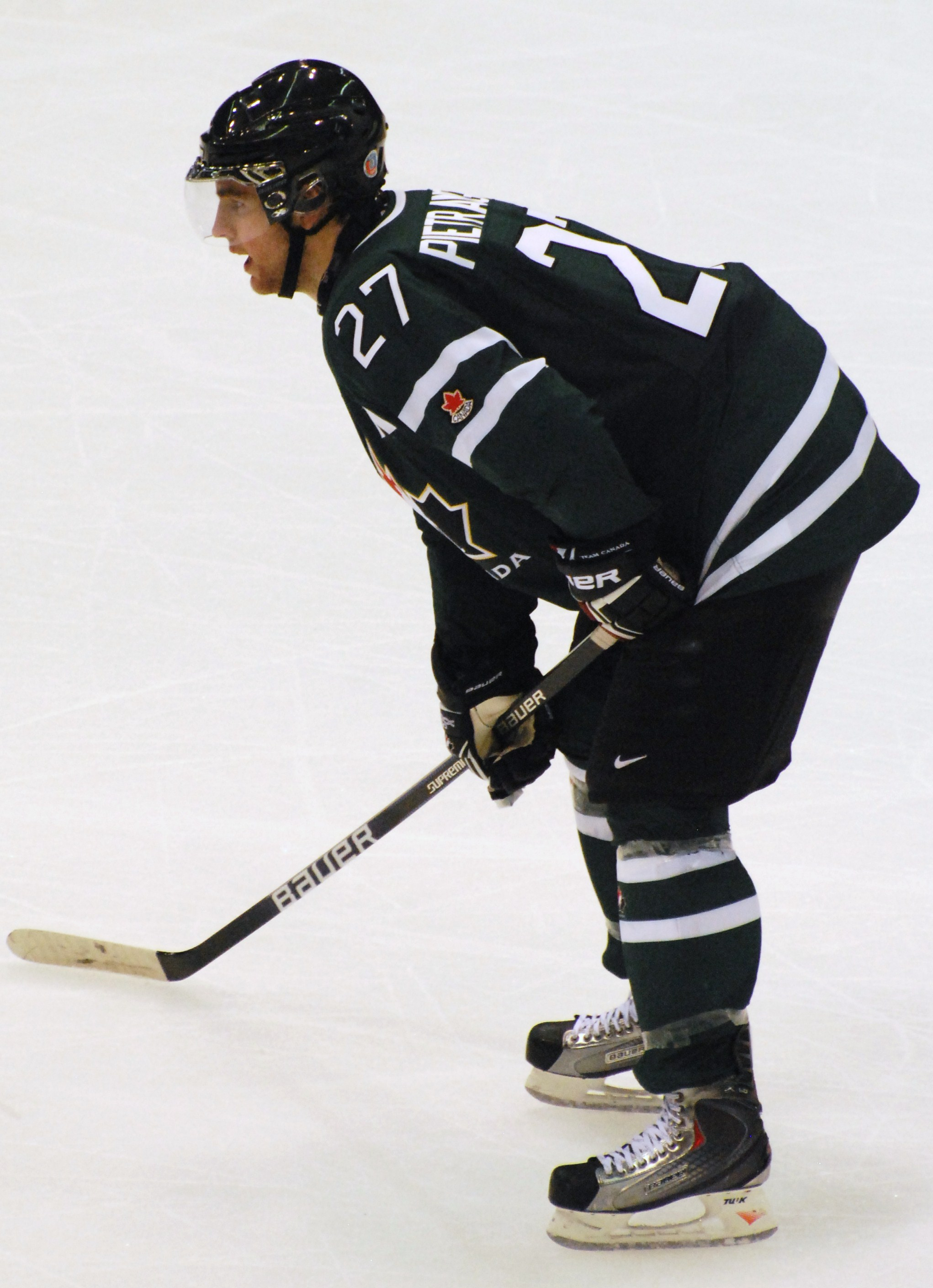
Alex Pietrangelo was selected fourth overall by the St. Louis Blues.

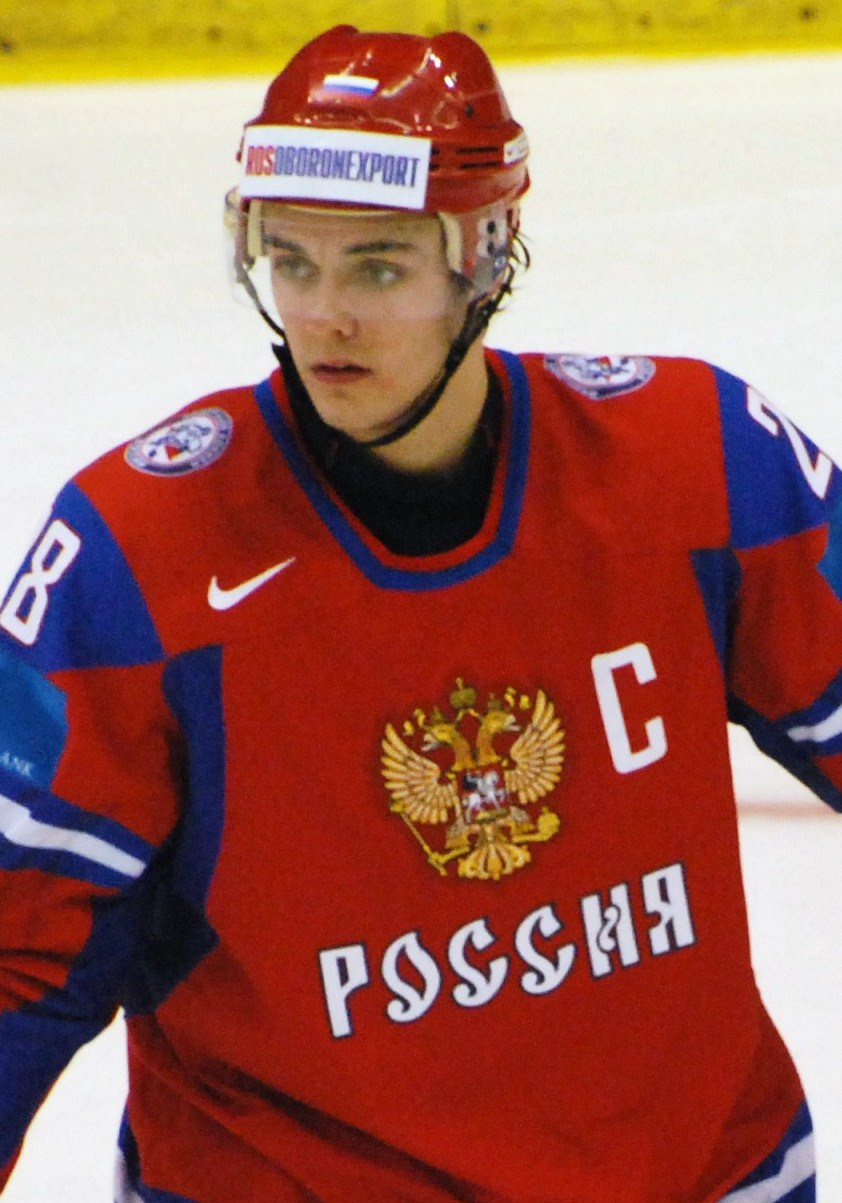
Nikita Filatov was selected sixth overall by the Columbus Blue Jackets.

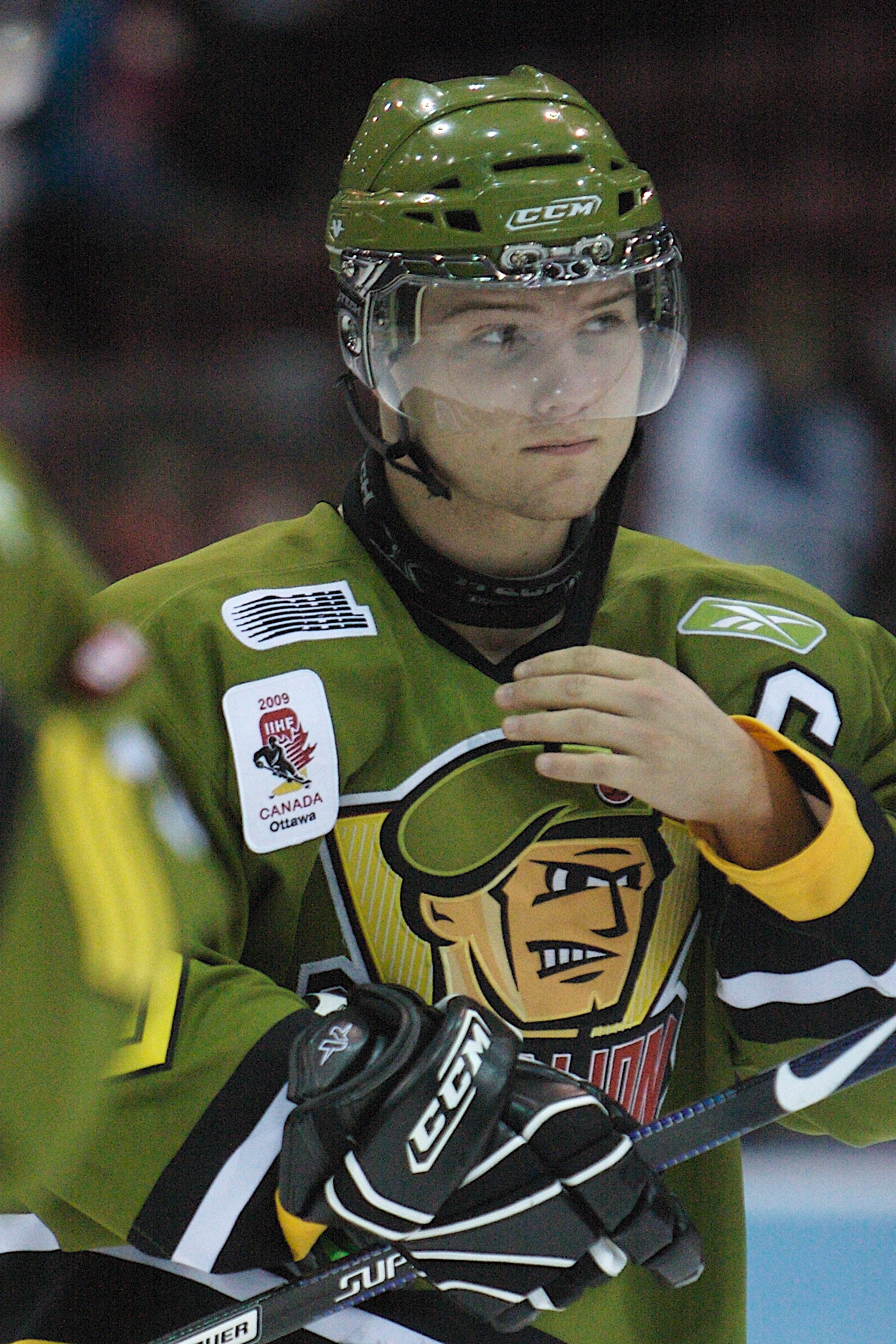
Cody Hodgson was selected tenth overall by the Vancouver Canucks.

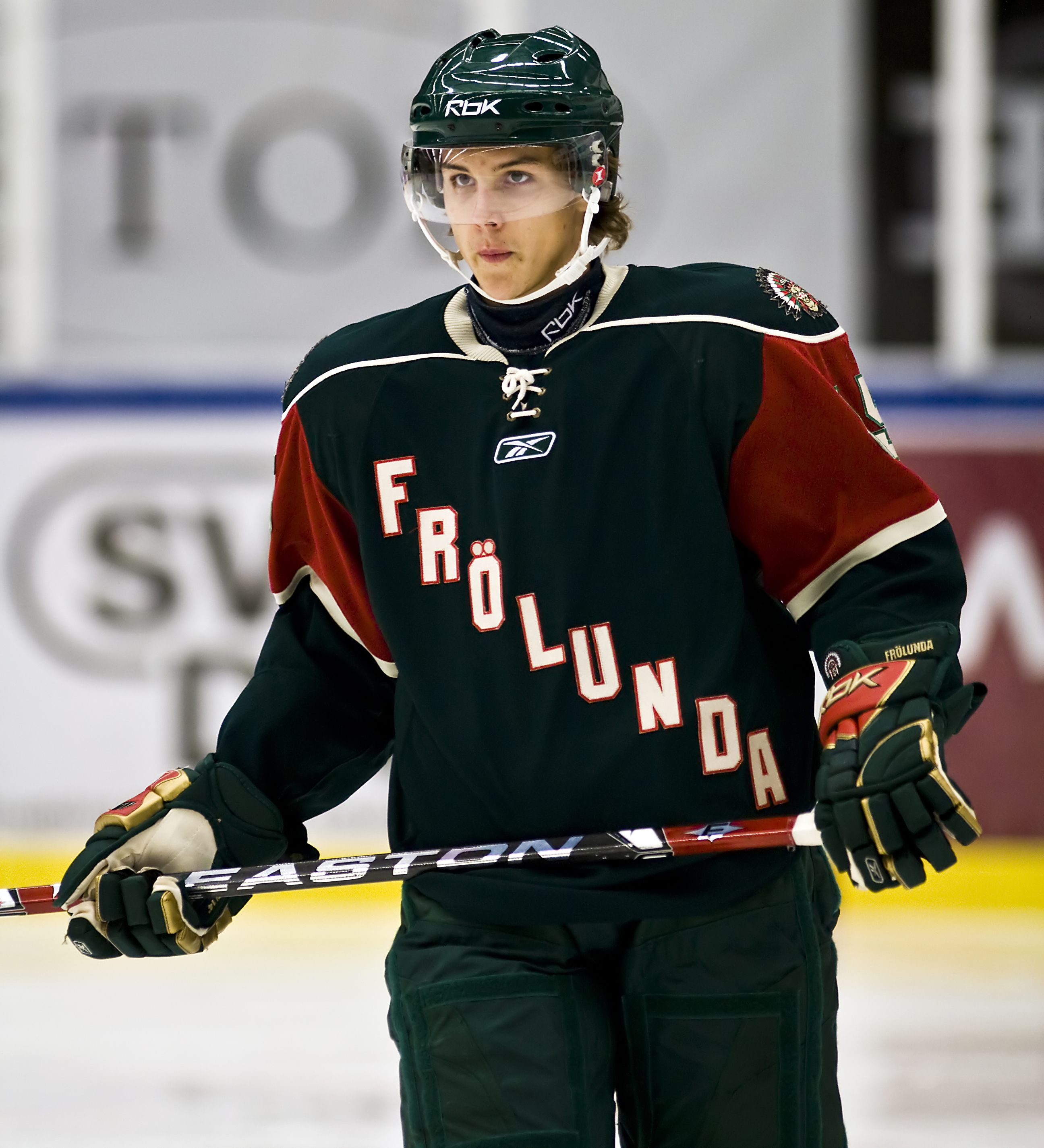
Erik Karlsson was selected 15th overall by the Ottawa Senators.

#	Player	Nationality	NHL team	College/junior/club team
1	Steven Stamkos (C)	Canada	Tampa Bay Lightning	Sarnia Sting (OHL)
2	Drew Doughty (D)	Canada	Los Angeles Kings	Guelph Storm (OHL)
3	Zach Bogosian (D)	United States	Atlanta Thrashers	Peterborough Petes (OHL)
4	Alex Pietrangelo (D)	Canada	St. Louis Blues	Niagara IceDogs (OHL)
5	Luke Schenn (D)	Canada	Toronto Maple Leafs (from NY Islanders)^{1}	Kelowna Rockets (WHL)
6	Nikita Filatov (LW)	Russia	Columbus Blue Jackets	CSKA Moscow (RSL)
7	Colin Wilson (C)	United States	Nashville Predators (from Toronto via NY Islanders)^{2}	Boston University (Hockey East)
8	Mikkel Boedker (LW)	Denmark	Phoenix Coyotes	Kitchener Rangers (OHL)
9	Josh Bailey (C)	Canada	New York Islanders (from Florida via Nashville)^{3}	Windsor Spitfires (OHL)
10	Cody Hodgson (C)	Canada	Vancouver Canucks	Brampton Battalion (OHL)
11	Kyle Beach (LW)	Canada	Chicago Blackhawks	Everett Silvertips (WHL)
12	Tyler Myers (D)	Canada	Buffalo Sabres (from Edmonton via Anaheim and Los Angeles)^{4}	Kelowna Rockets (WHL)
13	Colten Teubert (D)	Canada	Los Angeles Kings (from Buffalo)^{5}	Regina Pats (WHL)
14	Zach Boychuk (C)	Canada	Carolina Hurricanes	Lethbridge Hurricanes (WHL)
15	Erik Karlsson (D)	Sweden	Ottawa Senators (from Nashville)^{6}	Frolunda HC (J20 SuperElit)
16	Joe Colborne (LW)	Canada	Boston Bruins	Camrose Kodiaks (AJHL)
17	Jake Gardiner (D)	United States	Anaheim Ducks (from Calgary via Los Angeles)^{7}	Minnetonka High School (USHS–MN)
18	Chet Pickard (G)	Canada	Nashville Predators (from Ottawa)^{8}	Tri-City Americans (WHL)
19	Luca Sbisa (D)	Switzerland	Philadelphia Flyers (from Colorado via Columbus)^{9}	Lethbridge Hurricanes (WHL)
20	Michael Del Zotto (D)	Canada	New York Rangers	Oshawa Generals (OHL)
21	Anton Gustafsson (C)	Sweden	Washington Capitals (from New Jersey)^{10}	Frolunda HC (J20 SuperElit)
22	Jordan Eberle (RW)	Canada	Edmonton Oilers (from Anaheim)^{11}	Regina Pats (WHL)
23	Tyler Cuma (D)	Canada	Minnesota Wild (from Washington via New Jersey)^{12}	Ottawa 67's (OHL)
24	Mattias Tedenby (LW)	Sweden	New Jersey Devils (from Minnesota)^{13}	HV71 (SEL)
25	Greg Nemisz (RW)	Canada	Calgary Flames (from Montreal)^{14}	Windsor Spitfires (OHL)
26	Tyler Ennis (LW)	Canada	Buffalo Sabres (from San Jose)^{15}	Medicine Hat Tigers (WHL)
27	John Carlson (D)	United States	Washington Capitals (from Philadelphia)^{16}	Indiana Ice (USHL)
28	Viktor Tikhonov (RW)	Russia	Phoenix Coyotes (from Dallas via Los Angeles and Anaheim)^{17}	Severstal Cherepovets (RSL)
29	Daultan Leveille (C)	Canada	Atlanta Thrashers (from Pittsburgh)^{18}	St. Catharines Falcons (GOJHL)
30	Tom McCollum (G)	United States	Detroit Red Wings	Guelph Storm (OHL)

Notes

1. The New York Islanders' first-round pick went to the Toronto Maple Leafs as the result of a trade on June 20, 2008 that sent conditional second and third-round picks in either 2008 or 2009 to New York in exchange for this pick.
2. The Toronto Maple Leafs' first-round pick went to the Nashville Predators as the result of a trade on June 20, 2008 that sent a first-round pick in 2008 (9th overall) and Florida's second-round pick in 2008 (40th overall) to the New York Islanders in exchange for this pick.
  New York previously acquired this pick as the result of a trade on June 20, 2008 that sent a first-round pick in 2008 (5th overall) to Toronto in exchange for conditional second and third-round picks in either 2008 or 2009
3. The Florida Panthers' first-round pick went to the New York Islanders as the result of a trade on June 20, 2008 that sent a first-round pick 2008 (7th overall) to Nashville in exchange for Florida's second-round pick in 2008 (40th overall) and this pick.
  Nashville previously acquired this pick as the result of a trade on June 22, 2007 that sent Tomas Vokoun to Florida in exchange for Detroit's second-round pick in 2007, a conditional second-round pick in 2007 or 2008 and this pick.
4. The Edmonton Oilers' first-round pick went to the Buffalo Sabres as the result of a trade on June 20, 2008 that sent a first-round pick in 2008 (13th overall) and a third-round pick in 2009 to Los Angeles in exchange for this pick.
  Los Angeles previously acquired this pick as the result of a trade on June 20, 2008 that sent Calgary and Dallas' first-round picks in 2008 (17th and 28th overall) to Anaheim in exchange for this pick.
  Anaheim previously acquired this pick as compensation for not matching an offer sheet from Edmonton to restricted free agent Dustin Penner on August 2, 2007.
5. The Buffalo Sabres' first-round pick went to the Los Angeles Kings as the result of a trade on June 20, 2008 that sent Edmonton's first-round pick in 2008 (12th overall) to Buffalo in exchange for a third-round pick in 2009 and this pick.
6. The Nashville Predators' first-round pick went to the Ottawa Senators as the result of a trade on June 20, 2008 that sent a first-round pick in 2008 (18th overall) and a third-round pick in 2009 to Nashville in exchange for this pick.
7. The Calgary Flames' first-round pick went to the Anaheim Ducks as the result of a trade on June 20, 2008 that sent Edmonton's first-round pick in 2008 (12th overall) to Los Angeles in exchange for Dallas' first-round pick in 2008 (28th overall) and this pick.
  Los Angeles previously acquired this pick as the result of a trade on June 20, 2008 that sent Michael Cammalleri to Calgary in exchange for this pick.
8. The Ottawa Senators' first-round pick went to the Nashville Predators as the result of a trade on June 20, 2008 that sent a first-round pick in 2008 (15th overall) to Ottawa in exchange for a third-round pick in 2009 and this pick.
9. The Colorado Avalanche's first-round pick went to the Philadelphia Flyers as the result of a trade on June 20, 2008 that sent R. J. Umberger and a fourth-round pick in 2008 (118th overall) to Columbus in exchange for a third-round pick in 2008 (67th overall) and this pick.
  Columbus previously acquired this pick as the result of a trade on February 26, 2008 that sent Adam Foote to Colorado in exchange for a conditional fourth-round pick in 2009 and this pick (being conditional at the time of the trade). The condition – Colorado qualifies for the 2008 Stanley Cup playoffs – was converted.
10. The New Jersey Devils' first-round pick went to the Washington Capitals as the result of a trade on June 20, 2008 that sent a first and second-round pick in 2008 (23rd and 54th overall) to New Jersey in exchange for this pick.
11. The Anaheim Ducks' first-round pick went to the Edmonton Oilers as the result of a trade on July 3, 2006 that sent Chris Pronger to Anaheim in exchange for Joffrey Lupul, Ladislav Smid, a first-round pick in 2007, a second-round pick in 2008 and this pick (being conditional at the time of the trade). The condition – Edmonton will receive a first-round pick in 2008 if Anaheim reaches the 2007 Stanley Cup Finals – was converted on May 22, 2007.
12. The Washington Capitals' first-round pick went to the Minnesota Wild as the result of a trade on June 20, 2008 that sent a first-round pick in 2008 (24th overall) and a third-round pick in 2009 to New Jersey in exchange for this pick.
  New Jersey previously acquired this pick as the result of a trade on June 20, 2008 that sent a first-round pick in 2008 (21st overall) to Washington in exchange for a second-round pick in 2008 (54th overall) and this pick.
13. The Minnesota Wild's first-round pick went to the New Jersey Devils as the result of a trade on June 20, 2008 that sent Washington's first-round pick in 2008 (23rd overall) to Minnesota in exchange for a third-round pick in 2009 and this pick.
14. The Montreal Canadiens' first-round pick went to the Calgary Flames as the result of a trade on June 20, 2008 that sent Alex Tanguay and a fifth-round pick in 2008 (138th overall) to Montreal in exchange for a second-round pick in 2009 and this pick.
15. The San Jose Sharks' first-round pick went to the Buffalo Sabres as the result of a trade on February 26, 2008 that sent Brian Campbell and a seventh-round pick in 2008 to San Jose in exchange for Steve Bernier and this pick.
16. The Philadelphia Flyers' first-round pick went to the Washington Capitals as the result of a trade on June 20, 2008 that sent Steve Eminger and a third-round pick in 2008 (84th overall) to Philadelphia in exchange for this pick.
17. The Dallas Stars' first-round pick went to the Phoenix Coyotes as the result of a trade on June 20, 2008 that sent two second-round picks in 2008 (35th and 39th overall) to Anaheim in exchange for this pick.
  Anaheim previously acquired this pick as the result of a trade on June 20, 2008 that sent Edmonton's first-round pick in 2008 (12th overall) to Los Angeles in exchange for Calgary's first-round pick in 2008 (17th overall) and this pick.
  Los Angeles previously acquired this pick as the result of a trade on February 27, 2007 that sent Mattias Norstrom, Konstantin Pushkaryov, a third-round pick in 2007 and a fourth-round pick in 2007 to Dallas in exchange for Jaroslav Modry, Johan Fransson, a second-round pick in 2007, a third-round pick in 2007 and this pick.
18. The Pittsburgh Penguins' first-round pick went to the Atlanta Thrashers as the result of a trade on February 26, 2008 that sent Marian Hossa and Pascal Dupuis to Pittsburgh in exchange for Colby Armstrong, Erik Christensen, Angelo Esposito and this pick.

=== Round two ===
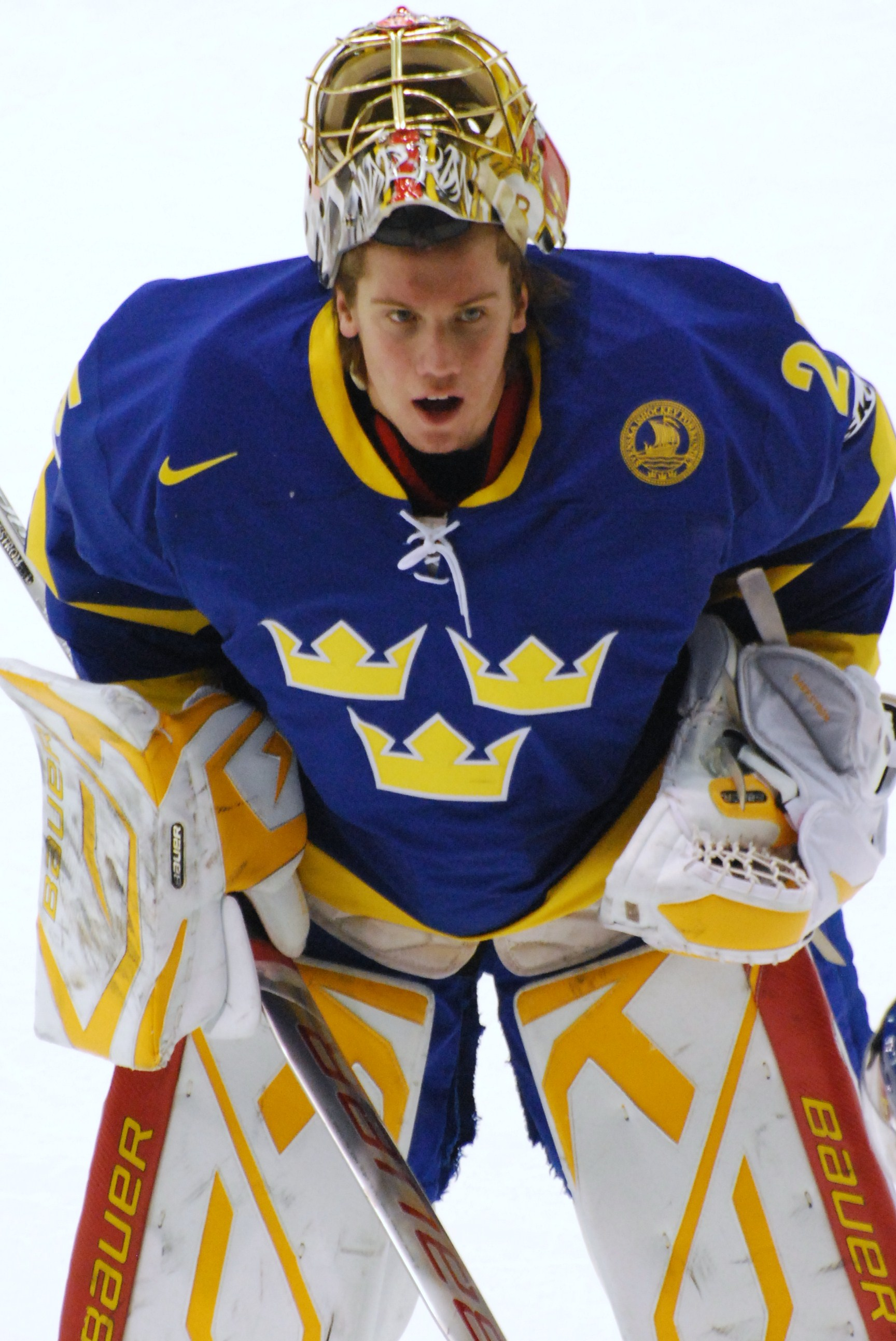
Jacob Markstrom was selected 31st overall by the Florida Panthers

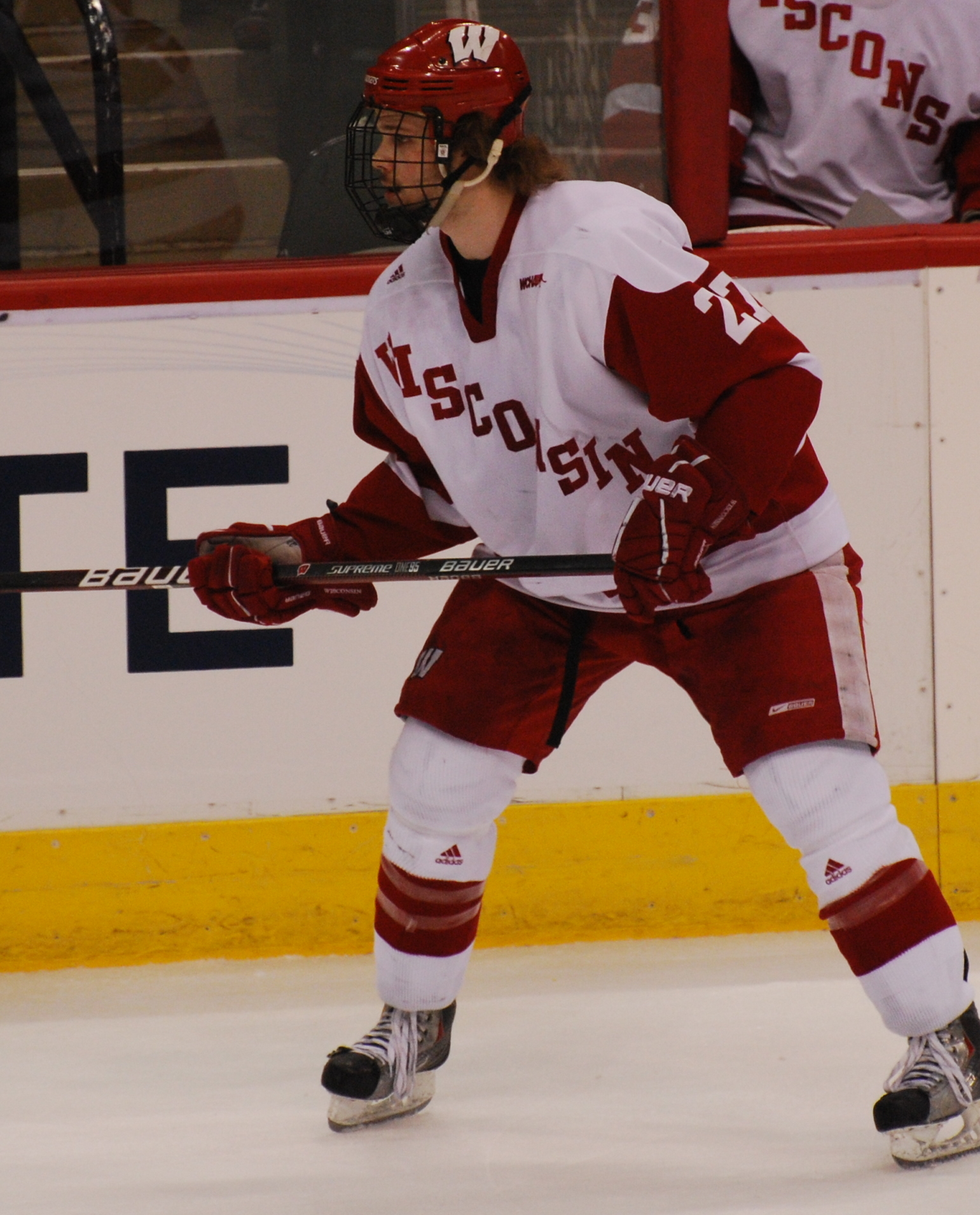
Cody Goloubef was selected 37th overall by the Columbus Blue Jackets

#	Player	Nationality	NHL team	College/junior/club team
31	Jacob Markstrom (G)	Sweden	Florida Panthers (from Tampa Bay)^{1}	Brynas IF (J20 SuperElit)
32	Slava Voynov (D)	Russia	Los Angeles Kings	Traktor Chelyabinsk (RSL)
33	Philip McRae (C)	United States	St. Louis Blues (from Atlanta)^{2}	London Knights (OHL)
34	Jake Allen (G)	Canada	St. Louis Blues	St. John's Fog Devils (QMJHL)
35	Nicolas Deschamps (C)	Canada	Anaheim Ducks (from Phoenix; compensatory)^{3}	Chicoutimi Saguenéens (QMJHL)
36	Corey Trivino (C)	Canada	New York Islanders	Stouffville Spirit (OPJHL)
37	Cody Goloubef (D)	Canada	Columbus Blue Jackets	University of Wisconsin–Madison (WCHA)
38	Roman Josi (D)	Switzerland	Nashville Predators (from Toronto via Phoenix)^{4}	SC Bern (NLA)
39	Eric O'Dell (C)	Canada	Anaheim Ducks (from Phoenix)^{5}	Sudbury Wolves (OHL)
40	Aaron Ness (D)	United States	New York Islanders (from Florida via Nashville)^{6}	Roseau High School (USHS–MN)
41	Yann Sauve (D)	Canada	Vancouver Canucks	Saint John Sea Dogs (QMJHL)
42	Patrick Wiercioch (D)	Canada	Ottawa Senators (from Chicago)^{7}	Omaha Lancers (USHL)
43	Justin Schultz (D)	Canada	Anaheim Ducks (from Edmonton)^{8}	Westside Warriors (BCHL)
44	Luke Adam (C)	Canada	Buffalo Sabres	St. John's Fog Devils (QMJHL)
45	Zac Dalpe (C/RW)	Canada	Carolina Hurricanes	Penticton Vees (BCHL)
46	Colby Robak (D)	Canada	Florida Panthers (Nashville via Phoenix)^{9}	Brandon Wheat Kings (WHL)
47	Maxime Sauve (C)	Canada	Boston Bruins	Val-d'Or Foreurs (QMJHL)
48	Mitch Wahl (C)	United States	Calgary Flames (from Calgary via Los Angeles)^{10}	Spokane Chiefs (WHL)
49	Jared Staal (RW)	Canada	Phoenix Coyotes (from Ottawa via Phoenix and Florida)^{11}	Sudbury Wolves (OHL)
50	Cameron Gaunce (D)	Canada	Colorado Avalanche	Mississauga St. Michael's Majors (OHL)
51	Derek Stepan (C)	United States	New York Rangers	Shattuck-Saint Mary's (USHS–MN)
52	Brandon Burlon (D)	Canada	New Jersey Devils	St. Michael's Buzzers (OPJHL)
53	Travis Hamonic (D)	Canada	New York Islanders (from Anaheim via Edmonton)^{12}	Moose Jaw Warriors (WHL)
54	Patrice Cormier (C)	Canada	New Jersey Devils (from Washington)^{13}	Rimouski Océanic (QMJHL)
55	Marco Scandella (D)	Canada	Minnesota Wild	Val-d'Or Foreurs (QMJHL)
56	Danny Kristo (RW)	United States	Montreal Canadiens	US National Team Development Program U-18 (USHL)
57	Eric Mestery (D)	Canada	Washington Capitals (from San Jose)^{14}	Tri-City Americans (WHL)
58	Dmitri Kugryshev (RW)	Russia	Washington Capitals (from Philadelphia)^{15}	CSKA Moscow (RSL)
59	Tyler Beskorowany (G)	Canada	Dallas Stars	Owen Sound Attack (OHL)
60	Jimmy Hayes (RW)	United States	Toronto Maple Leafs (from Pittsburgh)^{16}	Lincoln Stars (USHL)
61	Peter Delmas (G)	Canada	Colorado Avalanche (from Detroit via Los Angeles)^{17}	Lewiston Maineiacs (QMJHL)

Notes

1. The Tampa Bay Lightning's second-round pick went to the Florida Panthers as the result of a trade on June 13, 2007 that sent Chris Gratton to Tampa Bay in exchange for this pick (being conditional at the time of the trade). The condition and date of conversion are unknown.
2. The Atlanta Thrashers' second-round pick went to the St. Louis Blues as the result of a trade on February 25, 2007, that sent Keith Tkachuk to Atlanta in exchange for Glen Metropolit, a first and third-round pick in 2007, a conditional first-round pick in 2008 and this pick.
3. The Phoenix Coyotes' compensatory second-round pick went to the Anaheim Ducks as the result of a trade on June 20, 2008 that sent Dallas' first-round pick in 2008 (28th overall) to Phoenix in exchange for a second-round pick in 2008 (39th overall) and this pick.
  Phoenix previously acquired this pick as compensation for not signing 2004 first-round draft pick Blake Wheeler.
4. The Toronto Maple Leafs' second-round pick went to the Nashville Predators as the result of a trade on June 21, 2008 that sent a second and third-round pick in 2008 (46th and 76th overall) to Phoenix in exchange for this pick.
  Phoenix previously acquired this pick as the result of a trade on February 27, 2007 that sent Yanic Perreault and a fifth-round draft pick in 2008 to Toronto in exchange for Brendan Bell and this pick.
5. The Phoenix Coyotes' second-round pick went to the Anaheim Ducks as the result of a trade on June 20, 2008 that sent Dallas' first-round pick in 2008 (28th overall) pick to Phoenix in exchange for a compensatory second-round pick in 2008 (35th overall) and this pick.
6. The Florida Panthers' second-round pick went to the New York Islanders as the result of a trade on June 20, 2008 that sent Toronto's first-round pick in 2008 (7th overall) to Nashville in exchange for Florida's first-round pick in 2008 (9th overall) and this pick.
  Nashville previously acquired this pick as the result of a trade on June 22, 2007 that sent Tomas Vokoun to Florida in exchange for Detroit's second-round pick in 2007, a first-round pick in 2008 and this pick.
7. The Chicago Blackhawks' second-round pick went to the Ottawa Senators as the result of a trade on July 9, 2006 that sent Martin Havlat and Bryan Smolinski to Chicago in exchange for Tom Preissing, Josh Hennessy, Michal Barinka and this pick.
8. The Edmonton Oilers' second-round pick went to the Anaheim Ducks as compensation for not matching an offer sheet from Edmonton to restricted free agent Dustin Penner on August 2, 2007.
9. The Nashville Predators' second-round pick went to the Florida Panthers as the result of a trade on June 21, 2008 that sent Ottawa's second-round pick in 2008 (49th overall) and a fourth-round pick in 2009 to Phoenix in exchange for this pick.
  Phoenix previously acquired this pick as the result of a trade on June 21, 2008 that sent Toronto's second-round pick in 2008 (38th overall) to Nashville in exchange for a third-round pick in 2008 (76th overall) and this pick.
10. The Calgary Flames' second-round pick was re-acquired as the result of a trade on June 20, 2008 that sent a first-round pick in 2008 (17th overall) and a second-round pick in 2009 to Los Angeles in exchange for Michael Cammalleri and this pick.
  Los Angeles previously acquired this pick as the result of a trade on January 29, 2007 that sent Craig Conroy to Calgary in exchange for Jamie Lundmark, a fourth-round pick in 2007 and this pick.
11. The Ottawa Senators' second-round pick went to the Phoenix Coyotes as the result of a trade on June 21, 2008 that sent Nashville's second-round pick in 2008 (46th overall) to Florida in exchange for a fourth-round pick in 2009 and this pick.
  Florida previously acquired this pick as the result of a trade on June 20, 2008 that sent Olli Jokinen to Phoenix in exchange for Keith Ballard, Nick Boynton and this pick.
  Phoenix previously acquired this pick as the result of a trade on February 27, 2007 that sent Oleg Saprykin and a seventh-round pick in 2007 to Ottawa in exchange for this pick.
12. The Anaheim Ducks' second-round pick went to the New York Islanders as the result of a trade on July 5, 2007 that sent Allan Rourke and Edmonton's third-round pick in 2008 to Edmonton in exchange for this pick.
  Edmonton previously acquired this pick as the result of a trade on July 3, 2006 that sent Chris Pronger to Anaheim in exchange for Joffrey Lupul, Ladislav Smid, a first-round pick in 2007, a conditional first-round pick in 2008 and this pick.
13. The Washington Capitals' second-round pick went to the New Jersey Devils as the result of a trade on June 20, 2008 that sent a first-round pick in 2008 (21st overall) to Washington in exchange for a first-round pick (23rd overall) and this pick.
14. The San Jose Sharks' second-round pick went to the Washington Capitals as the result of a trade on June 23, 2007 that sent Buffalo's first-round pick in 2007 to San Jose for Carolina's second-round pick in 2007 and this pick.
15. The Philadelphia Flyers' second-round pick went to the Washington Capitals as the result of a trade on June 23, 2007 that sent Carolina's second-round pick in 2007 to Philadelphia in exchange for Nashville's third-round pick in 2007 and this pick.
16. The Pittsburgh Penguins' second-round pick went to the Toronto Maple Leafs as the result of a trade on February 26, 2008 that sent Hal Gill to Pittsburgh in exchange for a fifth-round pick in 2009 and this pick.
17. The Detroit Red Wings' second-round pick went to the Colorado Avalanche as the result of a trade on June 21, 2008 that sent Brad Richardson to Los Angeles in exchange for this pick.
  Los Angeles previously acquired this pick as the result of a trade on February 26, 2008 that sent Brad Stuart to Detroit in exchange for a fourth-round pick in 2009 and this pick.

=== Round three ===
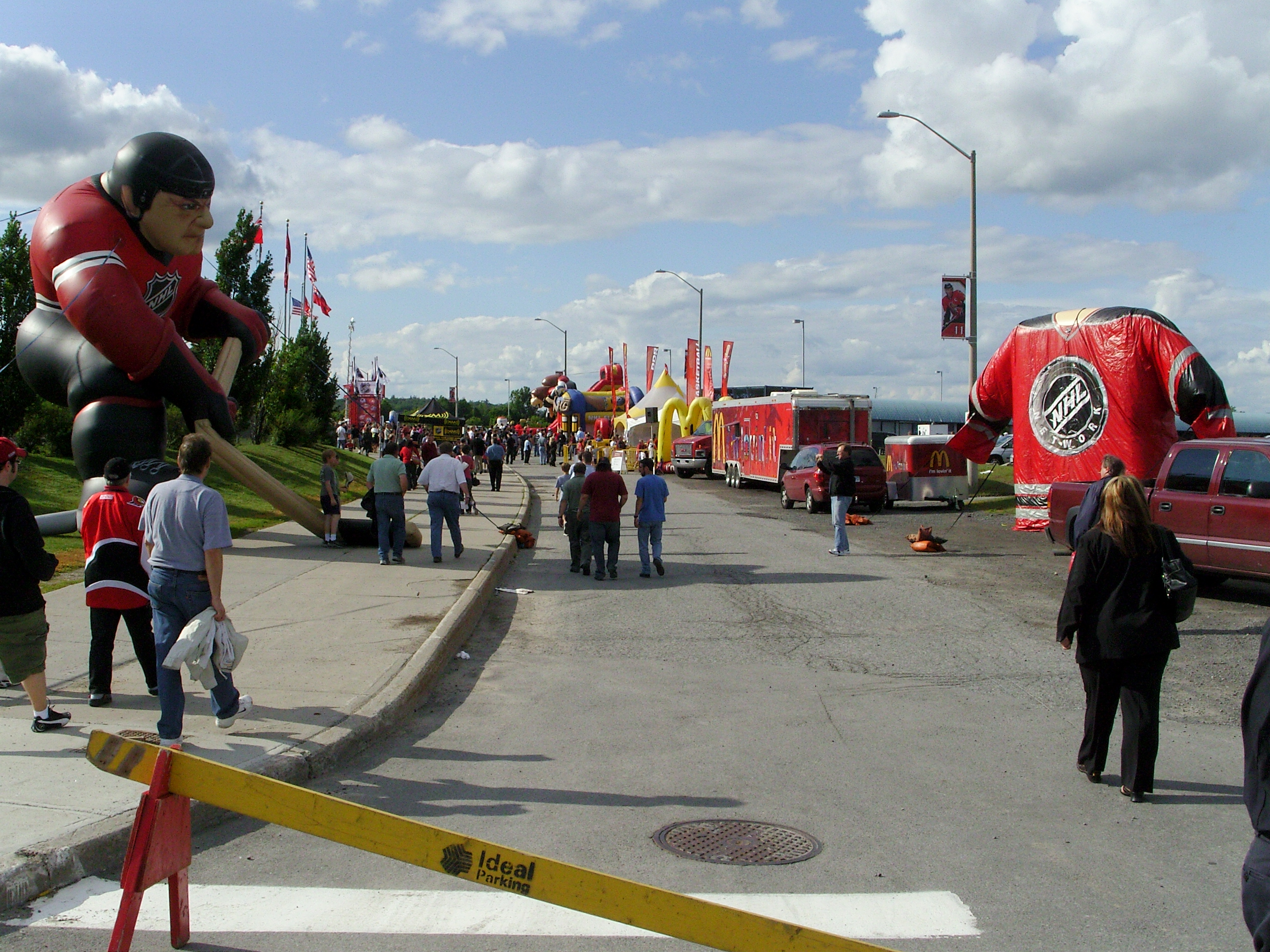
Fan Fest

#	Player	Nationality	NHL team	College/junior/club team
62	Justin Daniels (C)	United States	San Jose Sharks (from Tampa Bay)^{1}	Kent School (USHS-Connecticut)
63	Robert Czarnik (C)	United States	Los Angeles Kings	US National Team Development Program U-18 (USHL)
64	Danick Paquette (RW)	Canada	Atlanta Thrashers	Lewiston Maineiacs (QMJHL)
65	Jori Lehtera (C)	Finland	St. Louis Blues	Tappara (SM-liiga)
66	David Toews (C)	Canada	New York Islanders	Shattuck-Saint Mary's (USHS–MN)
67	Marc-Andre Bourdon (D)	Canada	Philadelphia Flyers (from Columbus)^{2}	Rouyn-Noranda Huskies (QMJHL)
68	Shawn Lalonde (D)	Canada	Chicago Blackhawks (from Toronto via NY Islanders)^{3}	Belleville Bulls (OHL)
69	Michael Stone (D)	Canada	Phoenix Coyotes	Calgary Hitmen (WHL)
70	James Livingston (RW)	Canada	St. Louis Blues (from Florida via Toronto)^{4}	Sault Ste. Marie Greyhounds (OHL)
71	Josh Brittain (LW)	Canada	Anaheim Ducks (from Vancouver)^{5}	Kingston Frontenacs (OHL)
72	Jyri Niemi (D)	Finland	New York Islanders (from Chicago)^{6}	Saskatoon Blades (WHL)
73	Kirill Petrov (RW)	Russia	New York Islanders (from Edmonton via NY Islanders, Edmonton and Anaheim)^{7}	Ak Bars Kazan (RSL)
74	Andrew Campbell (D)	Canada	Los Angeles Kings (from Buffalo)^{8}	Sault Ste. Marie Greyhounds (OHL)
75	Evgeny Grachev (C)	Russia	New York Rangers (from Carolina)^{9}	Lokomotiv Yaroslavl-2 (RUS-3)
76	Mathieu Brodeur (D)	Canada	Phoenix Coyotes (from Nashville)^{10}	Cape Breton Screaming Eagles (QMJHL)
77	Michael Hutchinson (G)	Canada	Boston Bruins	Barrie Colts (OHL)
78	Lance Bouma (C)	Canada	Calgary Flames	Vancouver Giants (WHL)
79	Zack Smith (C)	Canada	Ottawa Senators	Swift Current Broncos (WHL)
80	Adam Comrie (D)	Canada	Florida Panthers (from Colorado)^{11}	Saginaw Spirit (OHL)
81	Corey Fienhage (D)	United States	Buffalo Sabres (from NY Rangers via Los Angeles)^{12}	Eastview High School (USHS–MN)
82	Adam Henrique (C)	Canada	New Jersey Devils	Windsor Spitfires (OHL)
83	Marco Cousineau (G)	Canada	Anaheim Ducks	Baie-Comeau Drakkar (QMJHL)
84	Jacob DeSerres (G)	Canada	Philadelphia Flyers (from Washington)^{13}	Seattle Thunderbirds (WHL)
85	Brandon McMillan (C)	Canada	Anaheim Ducks (from Minnesota)^{14}	Kelowna Rockets (WHL)
86	Steve Quailer (RW)	United States	Montreal Canadiens	Sioux City Musketeers (USHL)
87	Ian Schultz (RW)	Canada	St. Louis Blues (from San Jose)^{15}	Calgary Hitmen (WHL)
88	Geordie Wudrick (LW)	Canada	Los Angeles Kings (from Philadelphia)^{16}	Swift Current Broncos (WHL)
89	Scott Winkler (C)	Norway	Dallas Stars	Cedar Rapids RoughRiders (USHL)
90	Tomas Kundratek (D)	Czech Republic	New York Rangers (from Pittsburgh via Phoenix)^{17}	Ocelari Trinec (Czech Extraliga)
91	Max Nicastro (D)	United States	Detroit Red Wings	Chicago Steel (USHL)

Notes

1. The Tampa Bay Lightning's third-round pick went to the San Jose Sharks as the result of a trade on June 21, 2008 that sent a fourth and fifth-round pick both in 2008 (117th and 147th overall) and a third-round pick in 2009 to Tampa Bay in exchange for this pick.
2. The Columbus Blue Jackets' third-round pick went to the Philadelphia Flyers as the result of a trade on June 20, 2008 that sent R. J. Umberger and a fourth-round pick in 2008 (118th overall) to Columbus in exchange for Colorado's first-round pick in 2008 (19th overall) and this pick.
3. The Toronto Maple Leafs' third-round pick went to the Chicago Blackhawks as the result of a trade on June 21, 2008 that sent a third and fourth-round pick both in 2008 (72nd and 102nd overall) to the New York Islanders in exchange for this pick.
  New York previously acquired this pick as the result of a trade on June 20, 2008 that sent a first-round pick in 2008 (5th overall) to Toronto in exchange for a first-round pick in 2008 (7th overall), a conditional second-round pick in 2009 and this pick (being conditional at the time of the trade). The condition – New York will receive a second-round pick in 2008 and a third-round pick in 2009 or a second-round pick in 2009 and a third-round pick in 2008, at the Islanders choice – was converted on June 21, 2008.
4. The Florida Panthers' third-round pick went to the St. Louis Blues as the result of a trade on June 19, 2008 that sent Jamal Mayers to Toronto in exchange for this pick.
  Toronto previously acquired this pick as the result of a trade on February 26, 2008 that sent Chad Kilger to Florida in exchange for this pick.
5. The Vancouver Canucks' third-round pick went to the Anaheim Ducks as the result of a trade on July 25, 2005 where Anaheim transferred a third-round pick in 2006 and a second-round pick in 2007 to Vancouver in exchange for this pick. Vancouver received these picks as compensation for the Ducks signing of head coach Randy Carlyle.
6. The Chicago Blackhawks' third-round pick went to the New York Islanders as the result of a trade on June 21, 2008 that sent Toronto's third-round pick in 2008 (68th overall) to Chicago in exchange for a fourth-round pick in 2008 (102nd overall) and this pick.
7. The Edmonton Oilers' third-round pick went to the New York Islanders as the result of a trade on February 19, 2008 that sent Marc-Andre Bergeron to Anaheim in exchange for this pick.
  Anaheim previously acquired this pick as compensation for not matching an offer sheet from Edmonton to restricted free agent Dustin Penner on August 2, 2007.
  Edmonton previously re-acquired this pick as the result of a trade on July 5, 2007 that sent Anaheim's second-round pick in 2008 to the New York Islanders in exchange for Allan Rourke and this pick.
  New York previously acquired this pick as the result of a trade on February 18, 2007 that sent Denis Grebeshkov to Edmonton in exchange for Marc-Andre Bergeron and this pick.
8. The Buffalo Sabres' third-round pick went to the Los Angeles Kings as the result of a trade on June 21, 2008 that sent the Rangers third-round pick in 2008 (81st overall) and Vancouver's fourth-round pick in 2008 (101st overall) to Buffalo in exchange for this pick.
9. The Carolina Hurricanes' third-round pick went to the New York Rangers as the result of a trade on July 17, 2007 that sent Matt Cullen to Carolina in exchange for Andrew Hutchinson, Joe Barnes and this pick.
10. The Nashville Predators' third-round pick went to the Phoenix Coyotes as the result of a trade on June 21, 2008 that sent Toronto's second-round pick in 2008 (38th overall) to Nashville in exchange for a second-round pick in 2008 (46th overall) and this pick.
11. The Colorado Avalanche's third-round pick went to the Florida Panthers as the result of a trade on February 26, 2008 that sent Ruslan Salei to Colorado in exchange for this Karlis Skrastins and this pick.
12. The New York Rangers' third-round pick went to the Buffalo Sabres as the result of a trade on June 21, 2008 that sent a third-round pick in 2008 (74th overall) to Los Angeles in exchange for Vancouver's fourth-round pick in 2008 (101st overall) and this pick.
  Los Angeles previously acquired this pick as the result of a trade on February 5, 2007 that sent Sean Avery and John Seymour to New York in exchange for Jason Ward, Jan Marek, Marc-Andre Cliche and this pick (being conditional at the time of trade). The condition – Los Angeles fails to sign Jan Marek before the 2007–08 season – was converted.
13. The Washington Capitals' third-round pick went to the Philadelphia Flyers as the result of a trade on June 20, 2008 that sent a first-round pick (27th overall) to Philadelphia in exchange for Steve Eminger and this pick.
14. The Minnesota Wild's third-round pick went to the Anaheim Ducks as the result of a trade on June 10, 2008 that sent Marc-Andre Bergeron to Minnesota in exchange for this pick.
15. The San Jose Sharks' third-round pick went to the St. Louis Blues as the result of a trade on June 22, 2007 that sent a first-round pick in 2007 to San Jose in exchange for Toronto's first and second-round picks in 2007 and this pick.
16. The Philadelphia Flyers' third-round pick went to the Los Angeles Kings as the result of a trade on February 19, 2008 that sent Jaroslav Modry to the Flyers in exchange for this pick.
17. The Pittsburgh Penguins' third-round pick went to the New York Rangers as the result of a trade on June 21, 2008 that sent Alex Bourret to Phoenix in exchange for this pick.
  Phoenix previously acquired this pick as the result of a trade on February 27, 2007 that sent Georges Laraque to Pittsburgh in exchange for Daniel Carcillo and this pick.

=== Round four ===
#	Player	Nationality	NHL team	College/junior/club team
92	Samuel Groulx (D)	Canada	San Jose Sharks (from Tampa Bay via Los Angeles)^{1}	Quebec Remparts (QMJHL)
93	Braden Holtby (G)	Canada	Washington Capitals (from Los Angeles)^{2}	Saskatoon Blades (WHL)
94	Vinny Saponari (RW)	United States	Atlanta Thrashers	US National Team Development Program U-18 (USHL)
95	David Warsofsky (D)	United States	St. Louis Blues	US National Team Development Program U-18 (USHL)
96	Matt Donovan (D)	United States	New York Islanders	Cedar Rapids RoughRiders (USHL)
97	Jamie Arniel (C)	Canada	Boston Bruins (from Columbus)^{3}	Sarnia Sting (OHL)
98	Mikhail Stefanovich (C)	Belarus	Toronto Maple Leafs	Quebec Remparts (QMJHL)
99	Colin Long (C)	United States	Phoenix Coyotes	Kelowna Rockets (WHL)
100	AJ Jenks (LW)	United States	Florida Panthers	Plymouth Whalers (OHL)
101	Justin Jokinen (RW)	United States	Buffalo Sabres (from Vancouver via Los Angeles)^{4}	Cloquet High School (USHS–MN)
102	David Ullstrom (C/LW)	Sweden	New York Islanders (from Chicago)^{5}	HV71 (J20 SuperElit)
103	Johan Motin (D)	Sweden	Edmonton Oilers	Bofors IK (HockeyAllsvenskan)
104	Jordon Southorn (D)	Canada	Buffalo Sabres	P.E.I. Rocket (QMJHL)
105	Michal Jordan (D)	Czech Republic	Carolina Hurricanes	Plymouth Whalers (OHL)
106	Harri Sateri (G)	Finland	San Jose Sharks (from Nashville)^{6}	Tappara (SM-liiga)
107	Steven Delisle (D)	Canada	Columbus Blue Jackets (from Boston)^{7}	Gatineau Olympiques (QMJHL)
108	Nick Larson (LW)	United States	Calgary Flames	Waterloo Black Hawks (USHL)
109	Andre Petersson (LW)	Sweden	Ottawa Senators	HV71 (J20 SuperElit)
110	Kelsey Tessier (C)	Canada	Colorado Avalanche	Quebec Remparts (QMJHL)
111	Dale Weise (RW)	Canada	New York Rangers (from NY Rangers via St. Louis and Nashville)^{8}	Swift Current Broncos (WHL)
112	Matt Delahey (D)	Canada	New Jersey Devils	Regina Pats (WHL)
113	Ryan Hegarty (D)	United States	Anaheim Ducks	US National Team Development Program U-18 (USHL)
114	T. J. Brodie (D)	Canada	Calgary Flames (from Washington via Boston)^{9}	Saginaw Spirit (OHL)
115	Sean Lorenz (D)	United States	Minnesota Wild	US National Team Development Program U-18 (USHL)
116	Jason Missiaen (G)	Canada	Montreal Canadiens	Peterborough Petes (OHL)
117	James Wright (C)	Canada	Tampa Bay Lightning (from San Jose)^{10}	Vancouver Giants (WHL)
118	Drew Olson (D)	United States	Columbus Blue Jackets (from Philadelphia)^{11}	Brainerd High School (USHS-Minnesota)
119	Derek Grant (C)	Canada	Ottawa Senators (from Dallas via Tampa Bay)^{12}	Langley Chiefs (BCHL)
120	Nathan Moon (C)	Canada	Pittsburgh Penguins	Kingston Frontenacs (OHL)
121	Gustav Nyquist (C)	Sweden	Detroit Red Wings	Malmo IF (J20 SuperElit)

Notes

1. The Tampa Bay Lightning's fourth-round pick went to the San Jose Sharks as the result of a trade on June 21, 2008 that sent a fourth-round pick in 2009 and a fifth-round pick in 2010 to Los Angeles in exchange for this pick.
  Los Angeles previously acquired this pick as the result of a trade on January 20, 2007 that sent Ryan Munce to Tampa Bay in exchange for this pick.
2. The Los Angeles Kings' fourth-round pick went to the Washington Capitals as the result of a trade on June 23, 2007 that sent a fourth-round pick in 2007 to Los Angeles in exchange for a sixth-round pick in 2007 and this pick.
3. The Columbus Blue Jackets' fourth-round pick went to the Boston Bruins as the result of a trade on June 21, 2008 that sent a fourth and fifth-round pick in 2008 (107th and 137th overall) to Columbus in exchange for this pick.
4. The Vancouver Canucks' fourth-round pick went to the Buffalo Sabres as the result of a trade on June 21, 2008 that sent a third-round pick in 2008 (74th overall) to Los Angeles in exchange for the Rangers third-round pick in 2008 (81st overall) and this pick.
  Los Angeles previously acquired this pick as the result of a trade on February 25, 2007 that sent Brent Sopel to Vancouver in exchange for a conditional second-round pick in 2007 and this pick.
5. The Chicago Blackhawks' fourth-round pick went to the New York Islanders as the result of a trade on June 21, 2008 that sent Toronto's third-round pick in 2008 (68th overall) to Chicago in exchange for a third-round pick in 2008 (72nd overall) and this pick.
6. The Nashville Predators' fourth-round pick went to the San Jose Sharks as the result of a trade on June 21, 2008 that sent Toronto's fourth-round pick in 2009 and a seventh-round pick in 2008 (207th overall) to Nashville in exchange for this pick.
7. The Boston Bruins' fourth-round pick went to the Columbus Blue Jackets as the result of a trade on June 21, 2008 that sent a fourth-round pick in 2008 (97th overall) to Boston in exchange for a fifth-round pick in 2008 (137th overall) and this pick.
8. The New York Rangers' fourth-round pick was re-acquired as the result of a trade on June 21, 2008 that sent a fourth-round pick in 2009 and a seventh-round pick in 2008 (201st overall) to Nashville in exchange for this pick.
  Nashville previously acquired this pick as the result of a trade on June 20, 2008 that sent Chris Mason to St. Louis in exchange for this pick.
  St. Louis previously acquired this pick as the result of a trade on February 26, 2008 that sent Christian Backman to New York in exchange for this pick.
9. The Washington Capitals' fourth-round pick went to the Calgary Flames as the result of a trade on February 10, 2007 that sent Andrew Ference and Chuck Kobasew to Boston in exchange for Brad Stuart, Wayne Primeau and this pick (being conditional at the time of the trade). The condition – If Calgary does not re-sign Brad Stuart for 2007–08 NHL season they will receive a fourth-round pick in 2008 – was converted on July 3, 2007.
  Boston previously acquired this pick as the result of a trade on February 1, 2007 that sent Milan Jurcina to Washington in exchange for this pick (being conditional at the time of the trade). The condition – Washington will receive a fourth-round pick in 2008 if Jurcina averages less than 20 minutes per game for the 2007–08 NHL season – the date of conversion is unknown.
10. The San Jose Sharks' fourth-round pick went to the Tampa Bay Lightning as the result of a trade on June 21, 2008 that sent a third-round pick in 2008 (62nd overall) to San Jose in exchange for a third-round pick in 2009, a fifth-round pick in 2008 (147th overall) and this pick.
11. The Philadelphia Flyers' fourth-round pick went to the Columbus Blue Jackets as the result of a trade on June 20, 2008 that sent Colorado's first-round pick in 2008 (19th overall) and a third-round pick in 2008 (67th overall) to Philadelphia for R. J. Umberger and this pick.
12. The Dallas Stars' fourth-round pick went to the Ottawa Senators as the result of a trade on June 23, 2007 that sent a fifth and seventh-round pick in 2007 and Phoenix's seventh-round pick in 2007 to Tampa Bay in exchange for this pick.
  Tampa Bay previously acquired this pick as the result of a trade on July 2, 2006 that sent Darryl Sydor to Dallas in exchange for this pick.

=== Round five ===
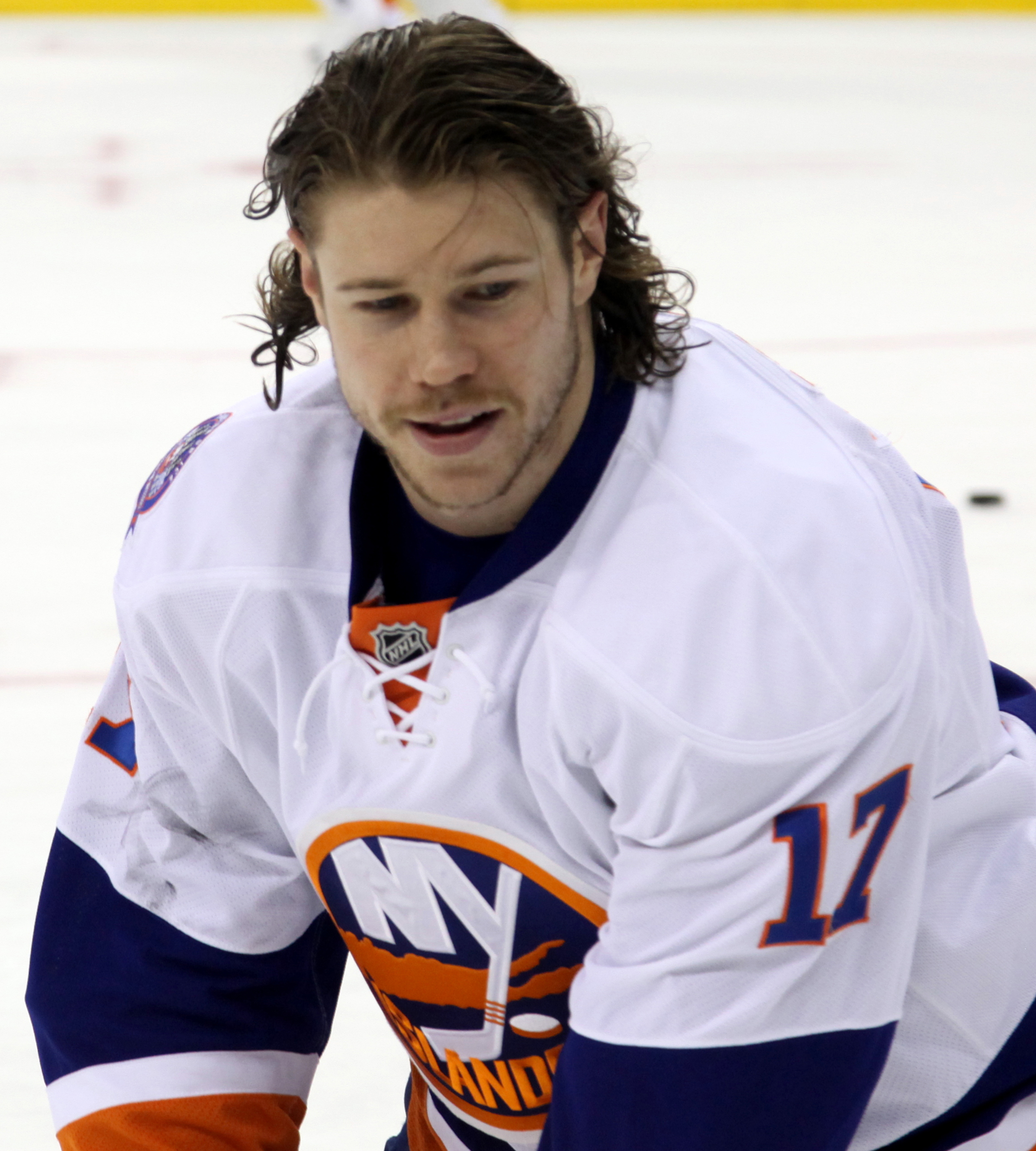
Matt Martin, who held the record for most hits in a season until the 2023–24 season, was selected 148th overall by the New York Islanders.

#	Player	Nationality	NHL team	College/junior/club team
122	Dustin Tokarski (G)	Canada	Tampa Bay Lightning	Spokane Chiefs (WHL)
123	Andrei Loktionov (C)	Russia	Los Angeles Kings	Yaroslavl-2 (RUS-3)
124	Nicklas Lasu (LW)	Sweden	Atlanta Thrashers	Frolunda HC (J20 SuperElit)
125	Kristofer Berglund (D)	Sweden	St. Louis Blues	IF Bjorkloven (HockeyAllsvenskan)
126	Kevin Poulin (G)	Canada	New York Islanders	Victoriaville Tigres (QMJHL)
127	Matt Calvert (LW)	Canada	Columbus Blue Jackets	Brandon Wheat Kings (WHL)
128	Greg Pateryn (D)	United States	Toronto Maple Leafs	Ohio Junior Blue Jackets (USHL)
129	Joel Champagne (C)	Canada	Toronto Maple Leafs (from Phoenix)^{1}	Chicoutimi Sagueneens (QMJHL)
130	Jerome Flaake (LW)	Germany	Toronto Maple Leafs (from Florida)^{2}	Kolner Haie (DEL)
131	Prab Rai (C)	Canada	Vancouver Canucks	Seattle Thunderbirds (WHL)
132	Teigan Zahn (D)	Canada	Chicago Blackhawks	Saskatoon Blades (WHL)
133	Philippe Cornet (LW)	Canada	Edmonton Oilers	Rimouski Océanic (QMJHL)
134	Jacob Lagace (LW)	Canada	Buffalo Sabres	Chicoutimi Saguenéens (QMJHL)
135	Tomas Kubalik (RW)	Czech Republic	Columbus Blue Jackets (from Carolina)^{3}	HC Lasselberger Plzen (Czech Extraliga)
136	Taylor Stefishen (LW)	Canada	Nashville Predators	Langley Chiefs (BCHL)
137	Brent Regner (D)	Canada	Columbus Blue Jackets (from Boston)^{4}	Vancouver Giants (WHL)
138	Maxim Trunev (RW)	Russia	Montreal Canadiens (from Calgary)^{5}	Severstal Cherepovets (RSL)
139	Mark Borowiecki (D)	Canada	Ottawa Senators	Smiths Falls Bears (CJHL)
140	Mark Olver (C)	Canada	Colorado Avalanche	Northern Michigan University (CCHA)
141	Chris Doyle (C)	Canada	New York Rangers	P.E.I. Rocket (QMJHL)
142	Kory Nagy (C)	Canada	New Jersey Devils	Oshawa Generals (OHL)
143	Stefan Warg (D)	Sweden	Anaheim Ducks	VIK Vasteras HK (HockeyAllsvenskan)
144	Joel Broda (C)	Canada	Washington Capitals	Moose Jaw Warriors (WHL)
145	Eero Elo (LW)	Finland	Minnesota Wild	Lukko Rauma (SM-liiga)
146	Julien Demers (D)	Canada	San Jose Sharks (from Montreal)^{6}	Ottawa 67's (OHL)
147	Kyle de Coste (RW)	Canada	Tampa Bay Lightning (from San Jose)^{7}	Brampton Battalion (OHL)
148	Matt Martin (LW)	Canada	New York Islanders (from Philadelphia)^{8}	Sarnia Sting (OHL)
149	Philip Larsen (D)	Denmark	Dallas Stars	Frolunda HC (Elitserien)
150	Alexander Pechursky (G)	Russia	Pittsburgh Penguins	Metallurg Magnitogorsk-2 (RUS-3)
151	Julien Cayer (C)	Canada	Detroit Red Wings	Northwood School (USHS-New York)

Notes

1. The Phoenix Coyotes' fifth-round pick went to the Toronto Maple Leafs as the result of a trade on February 27, 2007 that sent Brendan Bell and a second-round pick in 2008 to Phoenix in exchange for Yanic Perreault and this pick.
2. The Florida Panthers' fifth-round pick went to the Toronto Maple Leafs as the result of a trade on February 26, 2008 that sent Wade Belak to Florida in exchange for this pick.
3. The Carolina Hurricanes' fifth-round pick went to the Columbus Blue Jackets as the result of a trade on February 21, 2007 that sent Anson Carter to Carolina in exchange for this pick.
4. The Boston Bruins' fifth-round pick went to the Columbus Blue Jackets as the result of a trade on June 21, 2008 that sent a fourth-round pick in 2008 (97th overall) to Boston in exchange for a fourth-round pick in 2008 (107th overall) and this pick.
5. The Calgary Flames' fifth-round pick went to the Montreal Canadiens as the result of a trade on June 20, 2008 that sent a first-round pick in 2008 (25th overall) and a second-round pick in 2009 to Calgary in exchange for Alex Tanguay and this pick.
6. The Montreal Canadiens' fifth-round pick went to the San Jose Sharks as the result of a trade on February 25, 2007 that sent Josh Gorges and a first-round pick in 2007 to Montreal in exchange for Craig Rivet and this pick.
7. The San Jose Sharks' fifth-round pick went to the Tampa Bay Lightning as the result of a trade on June 21, 2008 that sent a third-round pick in 2008 (62nd overall) to San Jose in exchange for a third-round pick in 2009, a fourth-round pick in 2008 (117th overall) and this pick.
8. The Philadelphia Flyers' fifth-round pick went to the New York Islanders as the result of a trade on December 20, 2006 that sent Mike York to Philadelphia in exchange for Randy Robitaille and this pick.

=== Round six ===
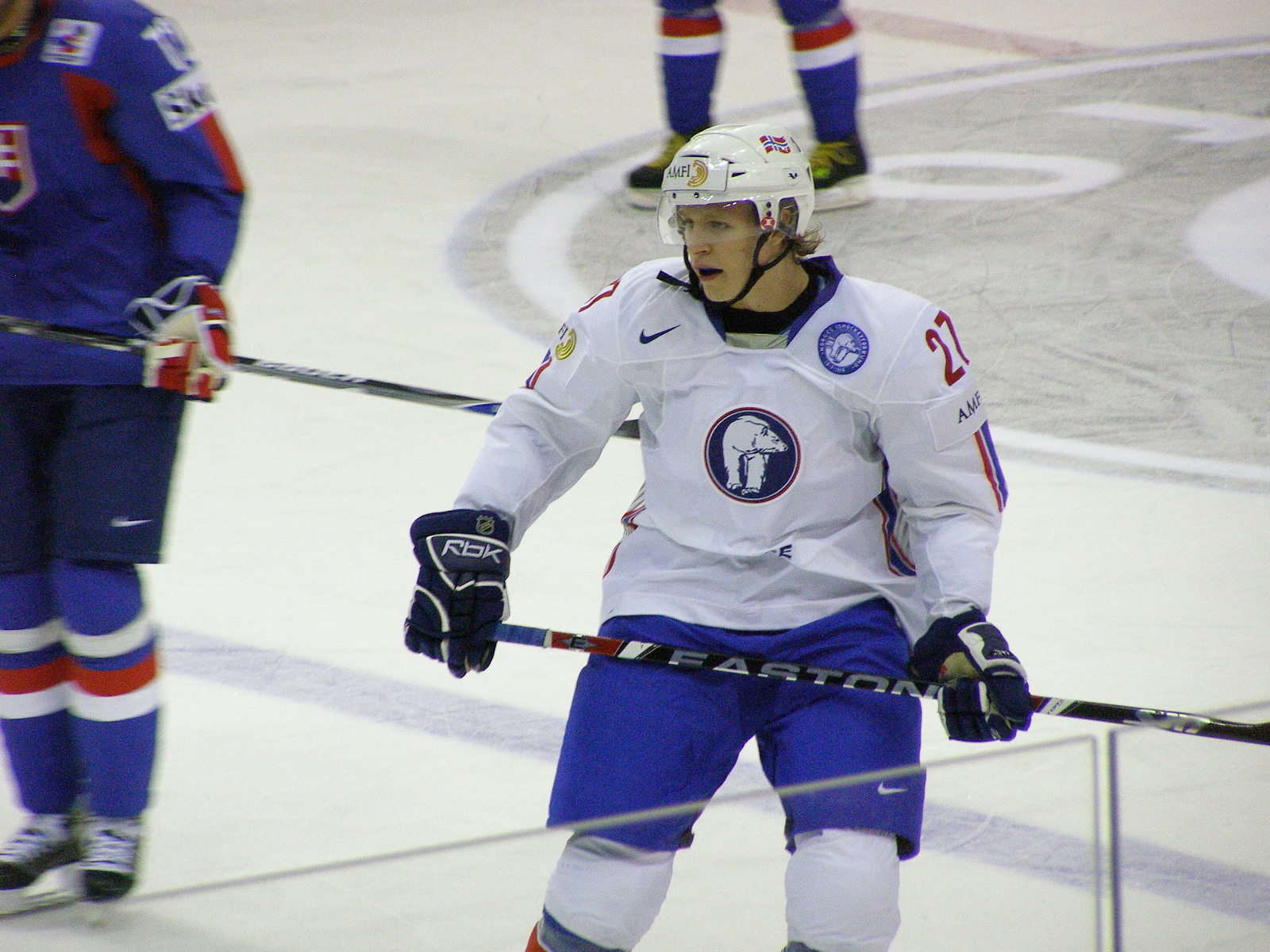
Mats Forshaug was selected 161st overall by the Vancouver Canucks.

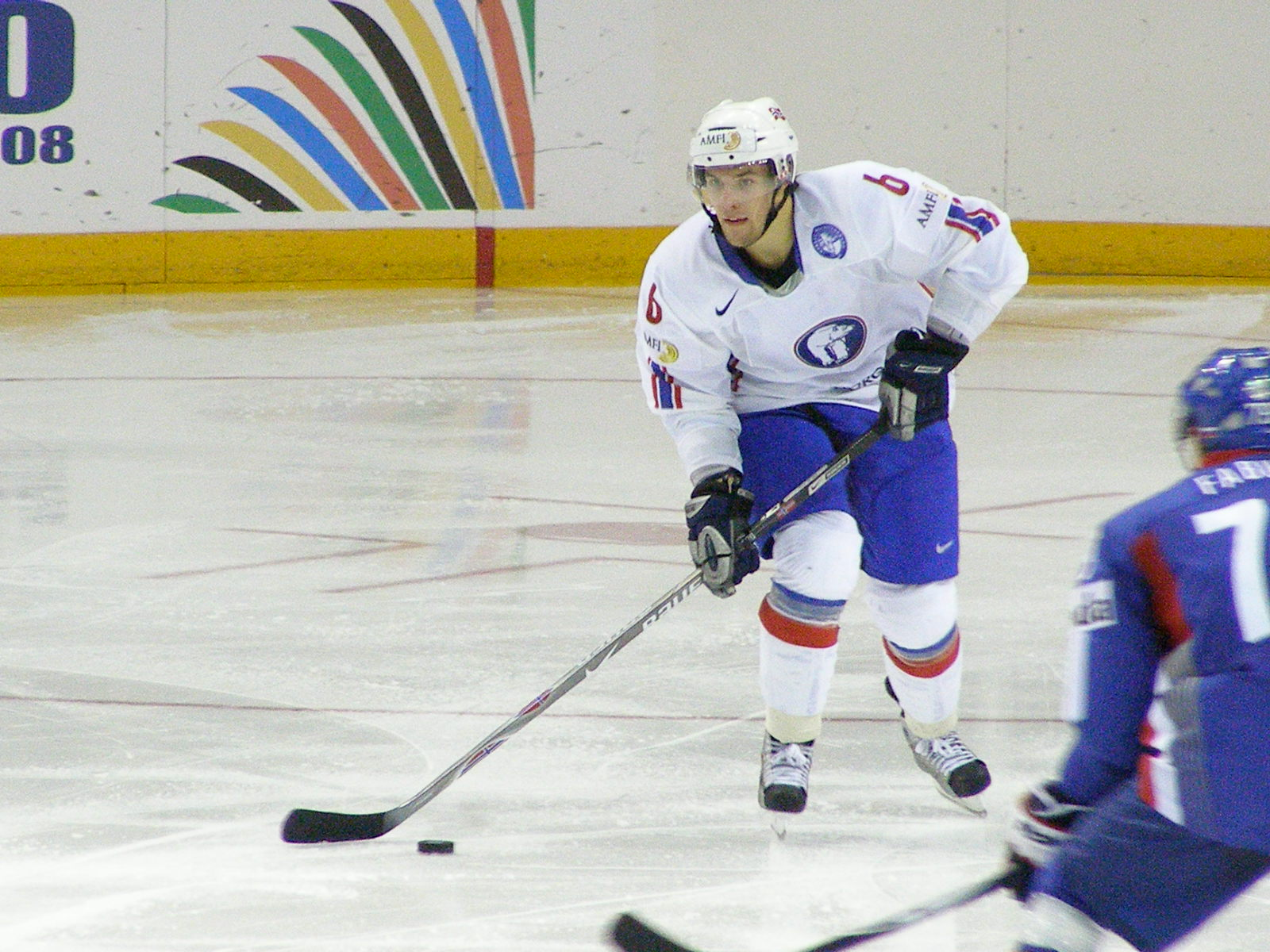
Jonas Holos was selected 170th overall by the Colorado Avalanche.

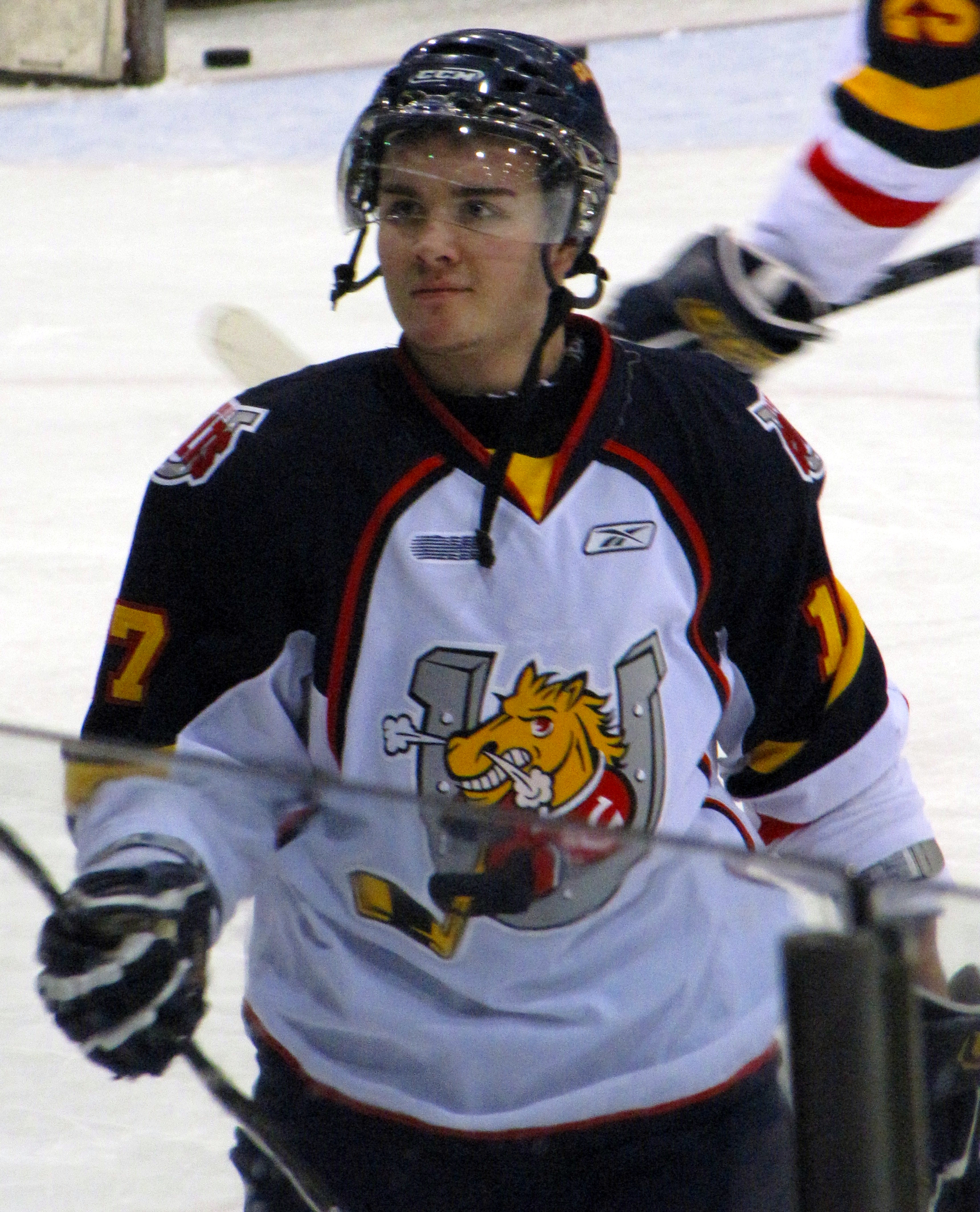
Zac Rinaldo was selected 178th overall by the Philadelphia Flyers.

#	Player	Nationality	NHL team	College/junior/club team
152	Mark Barberio (D)	Canada	Tampa Bay Lightning	Moncton Wildcats (QMJHL)
153	Justin Azevedo (C)	Canada	Los Angeles Kings	Kitchener Rangers (OHL)
154	Chris Carrozzi (G)	Canada	Atlanta Thrashers	Mississauga St. Michael's Majors (OHL)
155	Anthony Nigro (C)	Canada	St. Louis Blues	Guelph Storm (OHL)
156	Jared Spurgeon (D)	Canada	New York Islanders	Spokane Chiefs (WHL)
157	Cam Atkinson (RW)	United States	Columbus Blue Jackets	Avon Old Farms (USHS-Connecticut)
158	Grant Rollheiser (G)	Canada	Toronto Maple Leafs	Trail Smoke Eaters (BCHL)
159	Brett Hextall (C)	United States	Phoenix Coyotes	Penticton Vees (BCHL)
160	Luke Witkowski (D)	United States	Tampa Bay Lightning (from Florida via Chicago)^{1}	Ohio Junior Blue Jackets (USHL)
161	Mats Froshaug (C)	Norway	Vancouver Canucks	Linkopings HC (J20 SuperElit)
162	Jonathan Carlsson (D)	Sweden	Chicago Blackhawks	Brynas IF (J20 SuperElit)
163	Teemu Hartikainen (C)	Finland	Edmonton Oilers	KalPa (SM-liiga)
164	Nick Crawford (D)	Canada	Buffalo Sabres	Saginaw Spirit (OHL)
165	Mike Murphy (G)	Canada	Carolina Hurricanes	Belleville Bulls (OHL)
166	Jeff Foss (D)	United States	Nashville Predators	Rensselaer Polytechnic Institute (ECAC)
167	Joel Chouinard (D)	Canada	Colorado Avalanche (from Boston)^{2}	Victoriaville Tigres (QMJHL)
168	Ryley Grantham (C)	Canada	Calgary Flames	Moose Jaw Warriors (WHL)
169	Ben Smith (RW)	United States	Chicago Blackhawks (from Ottawa)^{3}	Boston College (Hockey East)
170	Jonas Holos (D)	Norway	Colorado Avalanche (from Colorado via San Jose)^{4}	Sparta Warriors (GET-ligaen)
171	Mitch Gaulton (D)	Canada	New York Rangers	Erie Otters (OHL)
172	David Wohlberg (C)	United States	New Jersey Devils	US National Team Development Program U-18 (USHL)
173	Nicholas Tremblay (C)	Canada	Boston Bruins (from Anaheim)^{5}	Smiths Falls Bears (CJHL)
174	Greg Burke (LW)	United States	Washington Capitals	New Hampshire Jr. Monarchs (EJHL)
175	Justin DiBenedetto (C)	Canada	New York Islanders (from Minnesota)^{6}	Sarnia Sting (OHL)
176	Matthew Tassone (C)	Canada	Dallas Stars (from Montreal)^{7}	Swift Current Broncos (WHL)
177	Tommy Wingels (C)	United States	San Jose Sharks	Miami University (CCHA)
178	Zac Rinaldo (C)	Canada	Philadelphia Flyers	Mississauga St. Michael's Majors (OHL)
179	Braden Birch (D)	Canada	Chicago Blackhawks (from Dallas via Los Angeles)^{8}	Oakville Blades (OPJHL)
180	Patrick Killeen (G)	Canada	Pittsburgh Penguins	Brampton Battalion (OHL)
181	Stephen Johnston (LW)	Canada	Detroit Red Wings	Belleville Bulls (OHL)

Notes

1. The Florida Panthers' sixth-round pick went to the Tampa Bay Lightning as the result of a trade on February 27, 2007 that sent Nikita Alexeev to Chicago in exchange for Karl Stewart and this pick.
  Chicago previously acquired this pick as the result of a trade on June 24, 2006 that sent Craig Anderson to Florida in exchange for this pick.
2. The Boston Bruins' sixth-round pick went to the Colorado Avalanche as the result of a trade on June 23, 2007 that sent Calgary's sixth-round pick in 2007 to Boston in exchange for this pick.
3. The Ottawa Senators' sixth-round pick went to the Chicago Blackhawks as the result of a trade on February 26, 2008 that sent Martin Lapointe to Ottawa in exchange for this pick.
4. The Colorado Avalanche's sixth-round was re-acquired as the result of a trade on June 23, 2007 that sent Anaheim's third-round pick in 2007 to San Jose in exchange for a fourth and fifth-round pick in 2007 and this pick.
  San Jose previously acquired this pick as the result of a trade on February 27, 2007 that sent Scott Parker to Colorado in exchange for this pick.
5. The Anaheim Ducks' sixth-round pick went to the Boston Bruins as the result of a trade on January 2, 2008 that sent Brandon Bochenski to Anaheim in exchange for Shane Hnidy and this pick.
6. The Minnesota Wild's sixth-round pick went to the New York Islanders as the result of a trade on February 26, 2008 that sent Chris Simon to Minnesota in exchange for this pick.
7. The Montreal Canadiens' sixth-round pick went to the Dallas Stars as the result of a trade on September 30, 2006 that sent Janne Niinimaa and a fifth-round pick in 2007 to Montreal in exchange for Mike Ribeiro and this pick.
8. The Dallas Stars' sixth-round pick went to the Chicago Blackhawks as the result of a trade on June 21, 2008 that sent a sixth-round pick in 2009 to Los Angeles in exchange for this pick.
  Los Angeles previously acquired this pick as the result of a trade on December 10, 2007 that sent Evgeny Federov to Dallas in exchange for this pick.

=== Round seven ===
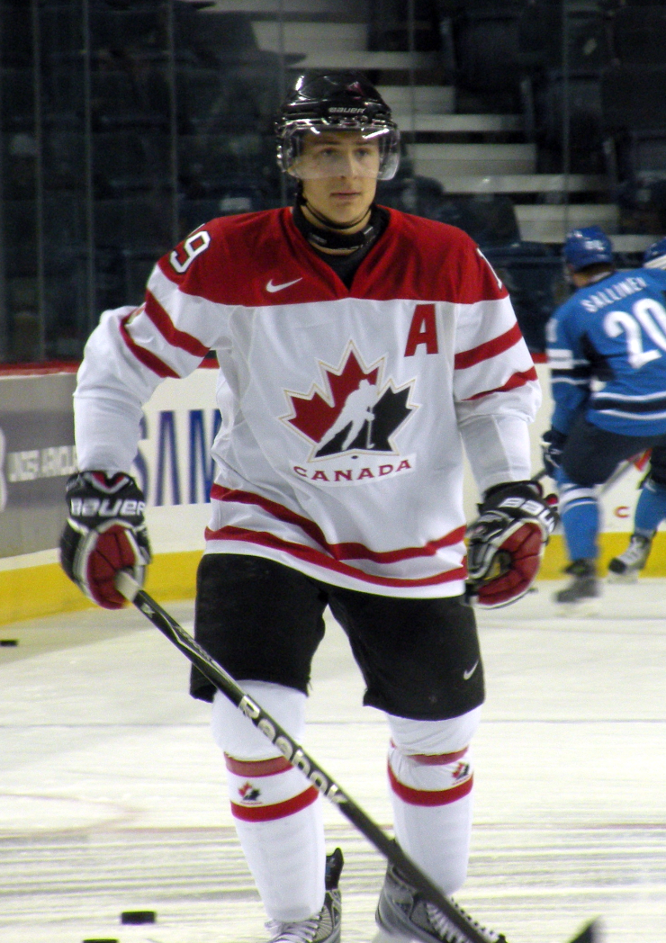
Stefan Della Rovere was selected 204th overall by the Washington Capitals.

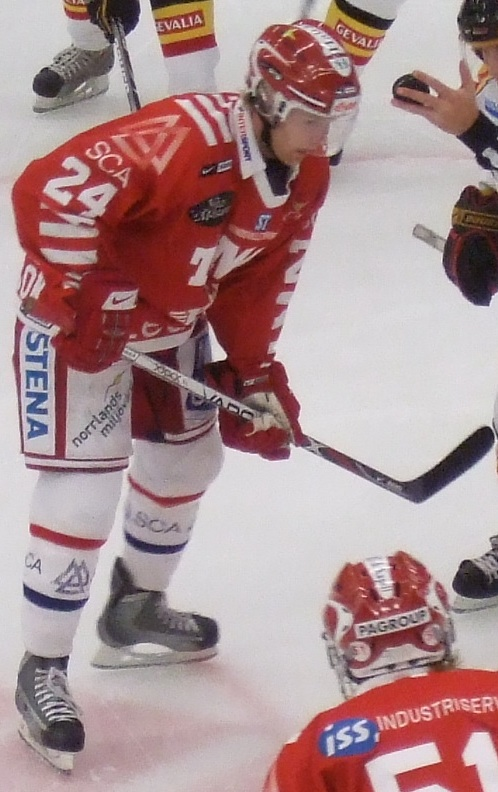
Jesper Samuelsson was selected 211th overall by the Detroit Red Wings.

#	Player	Nationality	NHL team	College/junior/club team
182	Matias Sointu (RW)	Finland	Tampa Bay Lightning	Ilves (SM-liiga)
183	Garrett Roe (LW)	United States	Los Angeles Kings	St. Cloud State University (WCHA)
184	Zach Redmond (D)	United States	Atlanta Thrashers	Ferris State University (CCHA)
185	Paul Karpowich (G)	Canada	St. Louis Blues (from St. Louis via Anaheim and Los Angeles)^{1}	Wellington Dukes (OPJHL)
186	Jason Demers (D)	Canada	San Jose Sharks (from NY Islanders)^{2}	Victoriaville Tigres (QMJHL)
187	Sean Collins (C)	Canada	Columbus Blue Jackets	Waywayseecappo Wolverines (MJHL)
188	Andrew MacWilliam (D)	Canada	Toronto Maple Leafs	Camrose Kodiaks (AJHL)
189	Tim Billingsley (D)	Canada	Phoenix Coyotes	Mississauga St. Michael's Majors (OHL)
190	Matt Bartkowski (D)	United States	Florida Panthers	Lincoln Stars (USHL)
191	Morgan Clark (G)	Canada	Vancouver Canucks	Red Deer Rebels (WHL)
192	Joe Gleason (D)	United States	Chicago Blackhawks	Edina High School (USHS–MN)
193	Jordan Bendfeld (D)	Canada	Edmonton Oilers	Medicine Hat Tigers (WHL)
194	Drew Daniels (RW)	United States	San Jose Sharks (from Buffalo)^{3}	Kent School (USHS–CT)
195	Samuel Morneau (LW)	Canada	Carolina Hurricanes	Baie-Comeau Drakkar (QMJHL)
196	Joacim Eriksson (G)	Sweden	Philadelphia Flyers (from Nashville via Tampa Bay)^{4}	Brynas IF (J20 SuperElit)
197	Mark Goggin (C)	United States	Boston Bruins	Choate Rosemary Hall (USHS–CT)
198	Alexander Deilert (D)	Sweden	Calgary Flames	Djurgardens IF (J20 SuperElit)
199	Emil Sandin (LW)	Sweden	Ottawa Senators	Brynas IF (J20 SuperElit)
200	Nathan Condon (C)	United States	Colorado Avalanche	Wausau West High School (USHS–WI)
201	Jani Lajunen (C)	Finland	Nashville Predators (from NY Rangers)^{5}	Espoo Blues (SM-liiga)
202	Harry Young (D)	Canada	New Jersey Devils	Windsor Spitfires (OHL)
203	David Carle (D)	United States	Tampa Bay Lightning (from Anaheim)^{6}	Shattuck-Saint Mary's (USHS–MN)
204	Stefan Della Rovere (LW)	Canada	Washington Capitals	Barrie Colts (OHL)
205	Jean-Sebastien Berube (LW)	Canada	New Jersey Devils (from Minnesota)^{7}	Rouyn-Noranda Huskies (QMJHL)
206	Patrick Johnson (C)	United States	Montreal Canadiens	University of Wisconsin–Madison (WCHA)
207	Anders Lindback (G)	Sweden	Nashville Predators (from San Jose)^{8}	Brynas IF (J20 SuperElit)
208	Nick Pryor (D)	United States	Anaheim Ducks (from Philadelphia)^{9}	US National Team Development Program U-18 (USHL)
209	Mike Bergin (D)	Canada	Dallas Stars	Smiths Falls Bears (CJHL)
210	Nicholas D'Agostino (D)	Canada	Pittsburgh Penguins	St. Michael's Buzzers (OPJHL)
211	Jesper Samuelsson (C)	Sweden	Detroit Red Wings	Timra IK (Elitserien)

Notes

1. The St. Louis Blues' seventh-round pick was re-acquired as the result of a trade on June 21, 2008 that sent a seventh-round pick in 2009 to Los Angeles in exchange for this pick.
  Los Angeles previously acquired this pick as the result of a trade on February 26, 2008 that sent Jean-Sebastien Aubin to Anaheim in exchange for this pick.
  Anaheim previously acquired this pick as the result of a trade on December 14, 2007 that sent Andy McDonald to St. Louis in exchange for Doug Weight, Michal Birner and this pick.
2. The New York Islanders' seventh-round pick went to the San Jose Sharks as the result of a trade on February 26, 2008 that sent Rob Davison to New York in exchange for this pick.
3. The Buffalo Sabres' seventh-round pick went to the San Jose Sharks as the result of a trade on February 26, 2008 that sent Steve Bernier and a first-round pick in 2008 to Buffalo in exchange for Brian Campbell and this pick.
4. The Nashville Predators' seventh-round pick went to the Philadelphia Flyers as the result of a trade on June 18, 2008 that sent Vaclav Prospal to Tampa Bay in exchange for a conditional fourth-round pick in 2009 and this pick.
  Tampa Bay previously acquired this pick as the result of a trade on February 26, 2008 that sent Jan Hlavac to Nashville in exchange for this pick.
5. The New York Rangers' seventh-round pick went to the Nashville Predators as the result of a trade on June 21, 2008 that sent a fourth-round pick in 2008 (111th overall) to New York in exchange for a fourth-round pick in 2009 and this pick.
6. The Anaheim Ducks' seventh-round pick went to the Tampa Bay Lightning as the result of a trade on February 26, 2008 that sent Jay Leach to Anaheim in exchange for Brandon Segal and this pick.
7. The Minnesota Wild's seventh-round pick went to the New Jersey Devils as the result of a trade on February 27, 2007 that sent Aaron Voros to Minnesota in exchange for this pick.
8. The San Jose Sharks' seventh-round pick went to the Nashville Predators as the result of a trade on June 21, 2008 that sent a fourth-round pick in 2008 (106th overall) to San Jose in exchange for Toronto's fourth-round pick in 2009 and this pick.
9. The Philadelphia Flyers' seventh-round pick went to the Anaheim Ducks as the result of a trade on June 21, 2008 that sent a seventh-round pick in 2009 to Philadelphia in exchange for this pick.

== Draftees based on nationality ==
Rank	Country	Picks	Percent	Top selection
	North America	166	78.7%	
1	Canada	124	58.8%	Steven Stamkos, 1st
2	United States	42	19.9%	Zach Bogosian, 3rd
	Europe	45	21.3%	
3	Sweden	17	8.1%	Erik Karlsson, 15th
4	Russia	9	4.3%	Nikita Filatov, 6th
5	Finland	7	3.3%	Jori Lehtera, 65th
6	Norway	3	1.4%	Scott Winkler, 89th
6	Czech Republic	3	1.4%	Tomas Kundratek, 90th
8	Denmark	2	0.9%	Mikkel Boedker, 8th
8	Switzerland	2	0.9%	Luca Sbisa, 19th
10	Belarus	1	0.5%	Mikhail Stefanovich, 98th
10	Germany	1	0.5%	Jerome Flaake, 130th

== North American draftees by state/province ==
Rank	State/Province	Selections	Top selection
1	Ontario	50	Steven Stamkos, 1st
2	Quebec	21	Nicolas Deschamps, 35th
3	Alberta	13	Tyler Myers, 12th
4	British Columbia	11	Kyle Beach, 11th
5	Manitoba	10	Colin Wilson, 7th
6	Minnesota	10	Jake Gardiner, 17th
7	Saskatchewan	9	Luke Schenn, 5th
8	Michigan	6	Robert Czarnik
9	New York	4	Zach Bogosian, 3rd
10	New Brunswick	3	Jake Allen, 34th
11	California	3	Mitch Wahl, 48th
12	Massachusetts	3	Jimmy Hayes, 60th
13	Virginia	2	Adam Comrie, 80th
14	Colorado	2	Steve Quailer, 86th
15	Connecticut	2	Cam Atkinson, 157th
16	Pennsylvania	2	Brett Hextall, 159th
17	Illinois	2	Tommy Wingels, 177th
18	Wisconsin	2	Nate Condon, 200th
19	New Jersey	1	John Carlson, 27th
20	Missouri	1	Phil McRae, 33rd
21	Newfoundland and Labrador	1	Luke Adam, 44th
22	Nova Scotia	1	Peter Delmas, 61st
23	Georgia	1	Vinny Saponari, 94th
24	Oklahoma	1	Matt Donovan, 96th
25	Prince Edward Island	1	Chris Doyle, 141st
26	North Dakota	1	Jeff Foss, 166th
27	New Hampshire	1	Greg Burke, 174th
28	Alaska	1	David Carle, 203rd

== See also ==
- 2007–08 NHL season
- 2008–09 NHL season
- 2007–08 NHL transactions
- 2008–09 NHL transactions
- List of NHL first overall draft choices
- List of NHL players
