= Jesper Samuelsson =

Swedish ice hockey player (born 1988)

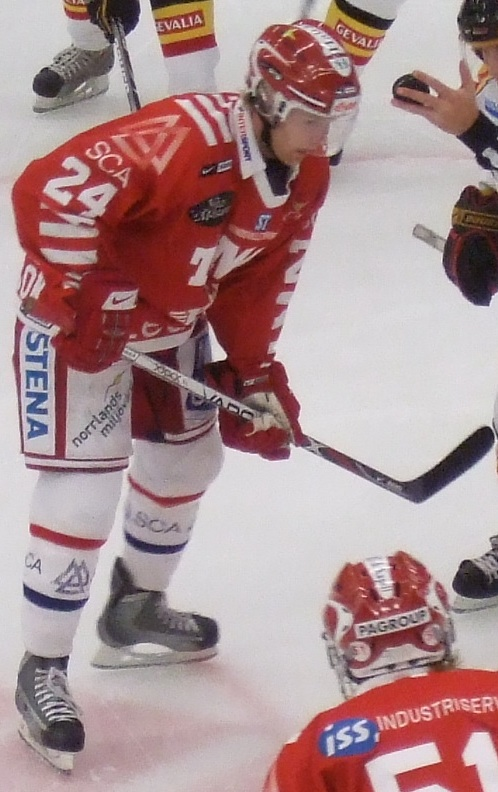
- Born: June 13, 1988 (age 38) Norrköping, Sweden
- Height: 5 ft 11 in (180 cm)
- Weight: 178 lb (81 kg; 12 st 10 lb)
- Position: Centre
- Shoots: Left
- HA team: HC Vita Hästen
- NHL draft: 211th overall, 2008; Detroit Red Wings
- Playing career: 2008–present

Jesper Samuelsson (born June 13, 1988) is a Swedish professional ice hockey player. He has played for several teams, including IF Sundsvall Hockey and Timrå IK.

In the 2008 NHL entry draft, Samuelsson was selected by the Detroit Red Wings in the 7th round, 211th overall, which happened to be the last pick in the draft. While he was not offered a contract with the Detroit Red Wings, he continued his career in Sweden.

Samuelsson has had success in his home country, including winning the Swedish HockeyAllsvenskan championship with Timrå IK in the 2017-2018 season. He has also represented Sweden in international competitions, playing for the national team in the 2012 World Junior Ice Hockey Championships.

Samuelsson continues to play in the Swedish HockeyAllsvenskan championship with HC Vita Hästen “C” even up to 2023. While drafted into the NHL, Samuelsson has not appeared in the league till date.
