= Allan Rourke =

Canadian ice hockey player (born 1980)

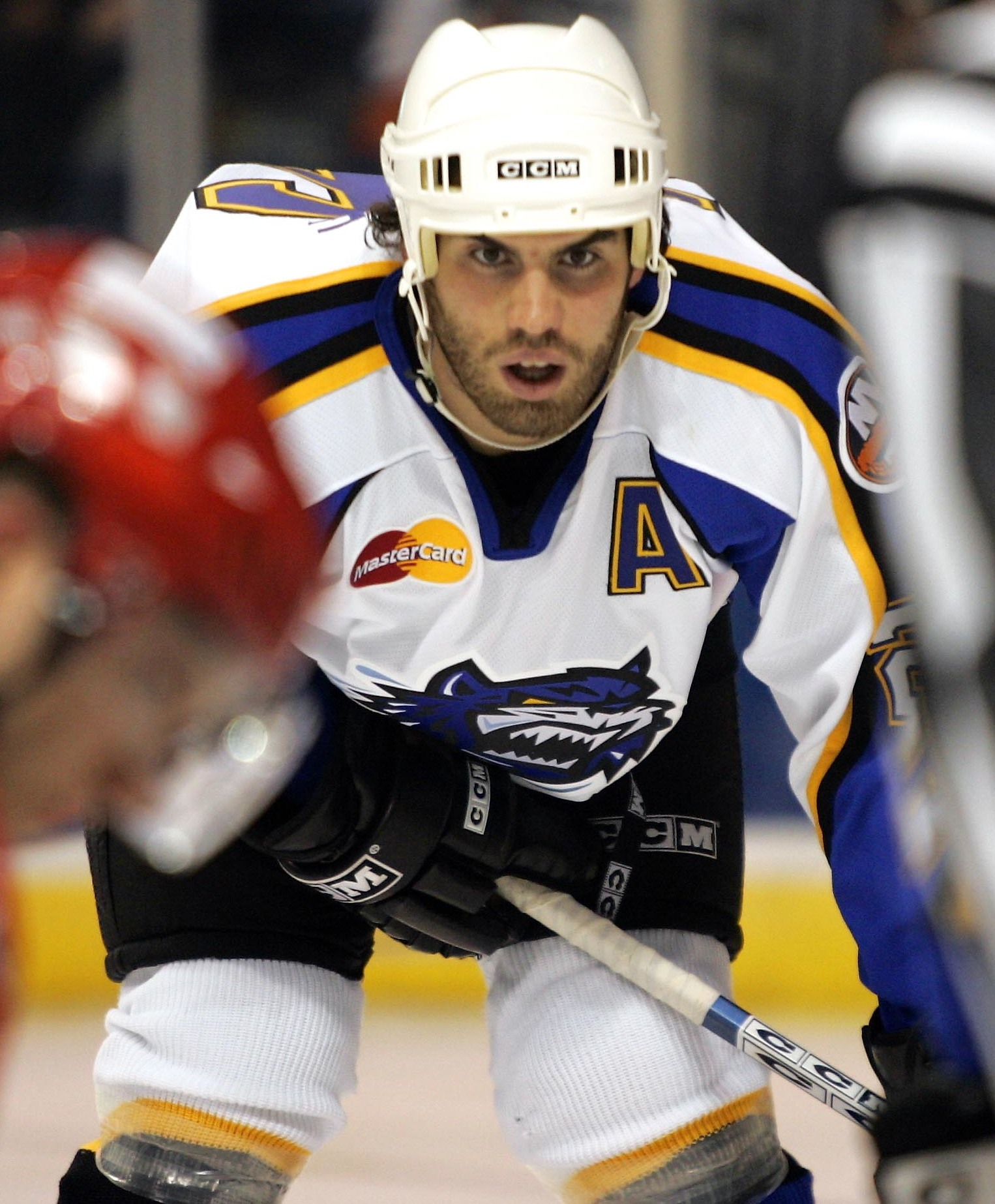
- Rourke with the Bridgeport Sound Tigers in 2005
- Born: March 6, 1980 (age 46) Mississauga, Ontario, Canada
- Height: 6 ft 2 in (188 cm)
- Weight: 215 lb (98 kg; 15 st 5 lb)
- Position: Defence
- Shot: Left
- Played for: Carolina Hurricanes; New York Islanders; Edmonton Oilers; Krefeld Pinguine
- NHL draft: 154th overall, 1998; Toronto Maple Leafs
- Playing career: 2000–2010

Allan Rourke (born March 6, 1980) is a Canadian former professional ice hockey player who played four seasons in the National Hockey League (NHL) for the Carolina Hurricanes, New York Islanders, and Edmonton Oilers.

== Biography ==
Rourke was born in Mississauga, Ontario. As a youth, he played in the 1994 Quebec International Pee-Wee Hockey Tournament with the Mississauga Reps minor ice hockey team.

Rourke was selected in the 6th round of the 1998 NHL entry draft, 154th overall, by the Toronto Maple Leafs, after a successful junior career with the Kitchener Rangers as an offensive defenceman. He was named as a second-team all-star in the 1999–2000 OHL season.

After three seasons in the Maple Leafs organization, exclusively with the St. John's Maple Leafs of the AHL, Rourke was dealt to the Carolina Hurricanes for Harold Druken. Rourke appeared in 25 games for the Hurricanes, and spent most of two seasons with their AHL affiliate, the Lowell Lock Monsters. After signing a free agent contract with the New York Islanders, Rourke again split time between the NHL and AHL, appearing in 17 games with New York and spending the majority of his time with the Bridgeport Sound Tigers. Rourke was subsequently dealt to the Edmonton Oilers, and assigned to the Springfield Falcons after failing to make the team in training camp. On November 8, 2007, Rourke was called up in place of Bryan Young, who was assigned to Springfield.

On May 27, 2008, Rourke signed with the ERC Ingolstadt of the German League, he played with EHC Black Wings Linz, Austria last season and signed than on 4 July 2009 a contract with Krefeld Pinguine.

== Career statistics ==
=== Regular season and playoffs ===
			Regular season					Playoffs
Season	Team	League	GP	G	A	Pts	PIM	GP	G	A	Pts	PIM
1996–97	Kitchener Rangers	OHL	25	1	1	2	12	6	0	0	0	0
1997–98	Kitchener Rangers	OHL	48	5	17	22	59	6	1	1	2	6
1998–99	Kitchener Rangers	OHL	66	11	28	39	79	1	0	0	0	2
1999–00	Kitchener Rangers	OHL	67	31	43	74	57	5	0	6	6	13
2000–01	St. John's Maple Leafs	AHL	64	9	19	28	36	—	—	—	—	—
2001–02	St. John's Maple Leafs	AHL	62	2	9	11	48	10	0	2	2	6
2002–03	St. John's Maple Leafs	AHL	65	12	19	31	49	—	—	—	—	—
2003–04	Lowell Lock Monsters	AHL	45	5	9	14	45	—	—	—	—	—
2003–04	Carolina Hurricanes	NHL	25	1	2	3	22	—	—	—	—	—
2004–05	Lowell Lock Monsters	AHL	60	7	9	16	75	11	1	2	3	40
2005–06	Bridgeport Sound Tigers	AHL	58	9	22	31	42	1	1	0	1	0
2005–06	New York Islanders	NHL	6	0	1	1	0	—	—	—	—	—
2006–07	Bridgeport Sound Tigers	AHL	60	5	15	20	60	—	—	—	—	—
2006–07	New York Islanders	NHL	11	0	1	1	4	—	—	—	—	—
2007–08	Springfield Falcons	AHL	44	3	11	14	24	—	—	—	—	—
2007–08	Edmonton Oilers	NHL	13	0	0	0	5	—	—	—	—	—
2008–09	ERC Ingolstadt	DEL	42	4	14	18	12	—	—	—	—	—
2008–09	EHC Black Wings Linz	EBEL	3	1	2	3	0	—	—	—	—	—
2009–10	Krefeld Pinguine	DEL	54	15	13	28	45	—	—	—	—	—
NHL totals			55	1	4	5	31	—	—	—	—	—
AHL totals			458	52	113	165	379	22	2	4	6	46
