= Kevin Lowe Trophy =

The Kevin Lowe Trophy (Trophée Kevin Lowe) is awarded annually to the player in the Quebec Maritimes Junior Hockey League (QMJHL) judged to be the best defensive defenceman. The winner is determined by the number of bodychecks, plus-minus differential, the player's role within the team, and the number of scoring opportunities.

The award is named after Kevin Lowe, an alumnus of the Quebec Remparts and a seven-time National Hockey League (NHL) all-star defenceman, and a six-time Stanley Cup winner for the Edmonton Oilers and New York Rangers.

== Winners ==
Season	Player	Team
2004–05	Nathan Saunders	Moncton Wildcats
2005–06	Olivier Magnan	Rouyn-Noranda Huskies
2006–07	Kris Letang	Val-d'Or Foreurs
2007–08	Mathieu Bolduc	Chicoutimi Saguenéens
2008–09	Maxime Ouimet	Rimouski Océanic
2009–10	David Savard	Moncton Wildcats
2010–11	Andrew Randazzo	Drummondville Voltigeurs
2011–12	Morgan Ellis	Shawinigan Cataractes
2012–13	Jonathan Narbonne	Moncton Wildcats
2013–14	Justin Haché	Cape Breton Screaming Eagles
2014–15	Jan Kostalek	Rimouski Océanic
2015–16	Allan Caron	Rouyn-Noranda Huskies
2016–17	Zachary Lauzon	Rouyn-Noranda Huskies
2017–18	Tobie Paquette-Bisson	Blainville-Boisbriand Armada
2018–19	Jacob Neveu	Rouyn-Noranda Huskies
2019–20	Adam McCormick	Cape Breton Eagles
2020–21	Noah Laaouan	Charlottetown Islanders
2021–22	Noah Laaouan	Charlottetown Islanders
2022–23	Tyson Hinds	Sherbrooke Phoenix
2023–24	Mikaël Diotte	Drummondville Voltigeurs
2024–25	Alex Carr	Rouyn-Noranda Huskies
2025–26	Félix Plamondon	Shawinigan Cataractes
