= Bill Zonnon =

Canadian ice hockey player (born 2006)

- Born: October 3, 2006 (age 20) Montreal, Quebec, Canada
- Height: 6 ft 2 in (188 cm)
- Weight: 190 lb (86 kg; 13 st 8 lb)
- Position: Right wing
- Shoots: Left
- NHL team (P) Cur. team: Pittsburgh Penguins; WBS Penguins (AHL)
- NHL draft: 22nd overall, 2025; Pittsburgh Penguins
- Playing career: 2026–present

Bill Zonnon (born October 3, 2006) is a Canadian ice hockey player for the Wilkes-Barre/Scranton Penguins of the American Hockey League (AHL) as a prospect to the Pittsburgh Penguins of the National Hockey League (NHL). He was drafted 22nd overall by the Penguins in the 2025 NHL entry draft.

== Playing career ==
Zonnon was drafted sixth overall by the Rouyn-Noranda Huskies in the 2022 QMJHL draft. During the 2022–23 season, in his rookie year, he recorded 16 goals and 23 assists in 63 games. During the 2023–24 season, he recorded 18 goals and 40 assists in 68 games. During the 2024–25 season, in his draft eligible year, he recorded 28 goals and 55 assists in 64 games. During the playoffs he led his team in scoring with eight goals and eight assists in 13 games. In three seasons with the Huskies he recorded 62 goals and 118 assists in 195 games. On June 5, 2025, he was traded to the Blainville-Boisbriand Armada, in exchange for Samuel Rheault and three first-round draft picks.

On June 27, 2025, he was drafted 22nd overall by the Pittsburgh Penguins in the 2025 NHL entry draft.

== Career statistics ==
			Regular season					Playoffs
Season	Team	League	GP	G	A	Pts	PIM	GP	G	A	Pts	PIM
2022–23	Rouyn-Noranda Huskies	QMJHL	63	16	23	39	12	9	2	5	7	0
2023–24	Rouyn-Noranda Huskies	QMJHL	68	18	40	58	28	10	6	4	10	2
2024–25	Rouyn-Noranda Huskies	QMJHL	64	28	55	83	32	13	8	8	16	8
2025–26	Blainville-Boisbriand Armada	QMJHL	35	14	32	46	6	17	2	13	15	8
2025–26	Wilkes-Barre/Scranton Penguins	AHL	—	—	—	—	—	11	4	3	7	2
QMJHL totals			230	76	150	226	78	49	18	30	48	18

Awards and achievements
Preceded by Ben Kindel	Pittsburgh Penguins first-round draft pick 2025	Succeeded by Will Horcoff
