= 2024–25 QMJHL season =

56th season of the QMJHL

- League: Quebec Maritimes Junior Hockey League
- Sport: Hockey
- Duration: Regular season September 20, 2024 – March 22, 2025; Playoffs; March 27, 2025 – May 19, 2025
- Teams: 18
- TV partner(s): Eastlink TV; TVA Sports; MATV

Draft
- Top draft pick: Maddox Dagenais
- Picked by: Quebec Remparts

Regular season
- Jean Rougeau Trophy: Moncton Wildcats (2)
- Season MVP: Jonathan Fauchon (Blainville-Boisbriand/Rimouski)
- Top scorer: Jonathan Fauchon (Blainville-Boisbriand/Rimouski)

Playoffs
- Playoffs MVP: Caleb Desnoyers (Wildcats)
- Finals champions: Moncton Wildcats
- Runners-up: Rimouski Océanic

QMJHL seasons
- 2023–24 2025–26

2024–25 CHL season
- League: Canadian Hockey League
- Sport: Hockey
- Duration: OHL; September 2024 – May 2025; QMJHL; September 2024 – May 2025; WHL; September 2024 – May 2025
- Teams: 60
- TV partner(s): CBC Television/Gem, TSN, RDS, Rogers TV, Shaw TV
- Season MVP: Gavin McKenna (Medicine Hat Tigers) (WHL)
- Top scorer: Michael Misa (Saginaw Spirit) (OHL)

Memorial Cup
- Finals champions: London Knights (OHL) (3rd title)
- Runners-up: Medicine Hat Tigers (WHL)

The 2024–25 QMJHL season was the 56th season of the Quebec Maritimes Junior Hockey League. The league played a 64-game regular season reduced from 68 games which began on September 20, 2024, and ended on March 22, 2025. This was the final season of play for the Acadie–Bathurst Titan, as the franchise was sold to a group that moved them to St. John's, Newfoundland for the 2025–26 season, where they will play as the Newfoundland Regiment.

== Regular season standings ==
As of March 22, 2025

Note: GP = Games played; W = Wins; L = Losses; OTL = Overtime losses; SL = Shootout losses; GF = Goals for; GA = Goals against; PTS = Points; x = clinched playoff berth; y = clinched division title; z = clinched Jean Rougeau Trophy

=== Eastern Conference ===
Maritimes Division	GP	W	L	OTL	SL	PTS	GF	GA	Rank
xyz-Moncton Wildcats	64	53	9	2	0	108	294	144	1
x-Cape Breton Eagles	64	34	23	4	3	75	212	195	5
x-Acadie–Bathurst Titan	64	33	28	2	1	69	182	212	6
x-Charlottetown Islanders	64	30	29	4	1	65	194	203	7
x-Halifax Mooseheads	64	18	33	8	1	47	155	231	9
Saint John Sea Dogs	64	21	43	0	0	42	154	262	10

East Division	GP	W	L	OTL	SL	PTS	GF	GA	Rank
xy-Rimouski Océanic	64	46	14	2	2	96	249	178	2
x-Chicoutimi Saguenéens	64	36	18	3	7	82	238	204	3
x-Baie-Comeau Drakkar	64	36	23	4	1	77	236	186	4
x-Quebec Remparts	64	23	34	3	4	53	177	237	8

=== Western Conference ===
West Division	GP	W	L	OTL	SL	PTS	GF	GA	Rank
xy-Rouyn-Noranda Huskies	64	37	19	3	5	82	258	210	2
x-Blainville-Boisbriand Armada	64	34	21	7	2	77	248	209	4
x-Val-d'Or Foreurs	64	29	28	6	1	65	239	270	6
x-Gatineau Olympiques	64	17	32	8	7	49	181	240	7

Central Division	GP	W	L	OTL	SL	PTS	GF	GA	Rank
xy-Drummondville Voltigeurs	64	40	18	3	3	86	224	174	1
x-Shawinigan Cataractes	64	38	18	3	5	84	253	190	3
x-Sherbrooke Phoenix	64	33	25	2	4	72	201	201	5
Victoriaville Tigres	64	17	43	1	3	38	166	315	8

== Scoring leaders ==
Note: GP = Games played; G = Goals; A = Assists; Pts = Points; PIM = Penalty minutes
Source: chl.ca

Player	Team	GP	G	A	Pts	PIM
Jonathan Fauchon	Blainville/Rimouski	64	46	57	103	50
Justin Carbonneau	Blainville-Boisbriand Armada	62	46	43	89	61
Philippe Veilleux	Val-d'Or Foreurs	64	40	47	87	16
Antonin Verreault	Rouyn-Noranda Huskies	63	37	48	85	38
Caleb Desnoyers	Moncton Wildcats	56	35	49	84	39
Luke Woodworth	Drummondville Voltigeurs	61	18	66	84	26
Bill Zonnon	Rouyn-Noranda Huskies	64	28	55	83	32
Matyas Melovsky	Baie-Comeau Drakkar	57	26	57	83	35
Vincent Desjardins	Blainville-Boisbriand Armada	64	18	63	81	37
Justin Poirier	Baie-Comeau Drakkar	58	43	37	80	57

== Leading goaltenders ==
Note: GP = Games played; Mins = Minutes played; W = Wins; L = Losses: OTL = Overtime losses; SL = Shootout losses; GA = Goals Allowed; SO = Shutouts; GAA = Goals against average
Source: chl.ca

Player	Team	GP	Mins	W	L	OTL	SOL	GA	SO	Sv%	GAA
William Lacelle	Rimouski Océanic	36	2,120:44	27	5	1	2	84	3	.909	2.38
Jacob Steinman	Moncton/Halifax	52	3,009:12	29	16	4	1	121	3	.923	2.41
Riley Mercer	Drummondville Voltigeurs	46	2,731:50	27	15	2	2	115	5	.925	2.53
Félix Hamel	Shawinigan/Blainville-Boisbriand	44	2,441:21	30	11	1	0	107	4	.914	2.63
Lucas Beckman	Baie-Comeau Drakkar	52	3,058:09	31	18	2	0	135	4	.914	2.65

== 2025 Gilles-Courteau Trophy playoffs ==
In the first two rounds seeding is determined by conference standings, and in the final two rounds seeding is determined by overall standings.

Conference quarterfinals
W1	Drummondville	3
E9	Halifax	4
W2	Rouyn-Noranda	4
W7	Gatineau	1
W3	Shawinigan	4
W6	Val-d'Or	1
W4	Blainville-Boisbriand	1
W5	Sherbrooke	4
E1	Moncton	4
E8	Quebec	0
E2	Rimouski	4
E7	Charlottetown	0
E3	Chicoutimi	4
E6	Acadie–Bathurst	1
E4	Baie-Comeau	4
E5	Cape Breton	2

Conference semifinals
W2	Rouyn-Noranda	4
E9	Halifax	0
W3	Shawinigan	4
W5	Sherbrooke	0
E1	Moncton	4
E4	Baie-Comeau	1
E2	Rimouski	4
E3	Chicoutimi	2

Semifinals
1	Moncton	4
6	Rouyn-Noranda	0
2	Rimouski	4
4	Shawinigan	3

Gilles-Courteau Trophy Championship
1	Moncton	4
2	Rimouski	2

== Conference quarterfinals ==
=== Western Conference quarterfinals ===
==== (1) Drummondville Voltigeurs vs. (8) Halifax Mooseheads ====
March 28	Halifax Mooseheads	3–2	Drummondville Voltigeurs	Centre Marcel-Dionne	Recap
No scoring		First period	No scoring
No scoring		Second period	1:36 - Luke Woodworth (1)
Antoine Fontaine (1) - 10:37; Caylen Blake (1) - 13:18; Quinn Kennedy (1) - 15:03		Third period	5:37 - Ethan Gauthier (1)
Jacob Steinman (33 saves / 35 shots)		Goalie stats	Riley Mercer (14 saves / 14 shots); Louis-Félix Charrois (2 saves / 5 shots)

March 29	Halifax Mooseheads	3–2	OT	Drummondville Voltigeurs	Centre Marcel-Dionne	Recap
Shawn Carrier (1) - pp - 0:46		First period		4:34 - Ethan Gauthier (2)
No scoring		Second period		No scoring
Braeden MacPhee (1) - 0:54		Third period		19:22 - Sam Oliver (1)
Liam Kilfoil (1) - pp - 16:40		First overtime period		No scoring
Jacob Steinman (45 saves / 47 shots)		Goalie stats		Louis-Félix Charrois (24 saves / 27 shots)

April 1	Drummondville Voltigeurs	4–1	Halifax Mooseheads	Scotiabank Centre	Recap
Luke Woodworth (2) - 11:27		First period	No scoring
No scoring		Second period	No scoring
Luke Woodworth (3) - 8:57; Sam Oliver (2) - 18:26; Jesse Allecia (1) - pp - en - 19:13		Third period	17:42 - Quinn Kennedy (2)
Louis-Félix Charrois (22 saves / 23 shots)		Goalie stats	Jacob Steinman (30 saves / 33 shots)

April 2	Drummondville Voltigeurs	3–1	Halifax Mooseheads	Scotiabank Centre	Recap
No scoring		First period	No scoring
Ethan Gauthier (3) - sh - 15:08		Second period	No scoring
Ethan Gauthier (4) - pp - 1:12; Ethan Gauthier (5) - 12:39		Third period	11:12 - Owen Phillips (1)
Louis-Félix Charrois (16 saves / 17 shots)		Goalie stats	Jacob Steinman (51 saves / 54 shots)

April 4	Drummondville Voltigeurs	2–4	Halifax Mooseheads	Scotiabank Centre	Recap

April 7	Halifax Mooseheads	0–6	Drummondville Voltigeurs	Centre Marcel-Dionne	Recap

April 8	Halifax Mooseheads	2–0	Drummondville Voltigeurs	Centre Marcel-Dionne	Recap

Halifax wins series 4 – 3

==== (2) Rouyn-Noranda Huskies vs. (7) Gatineau Olympiques ====
March 28	Gatineau Olympiques	1–5	Rouyn-Noranda Huskies	Aréna Glencore	Recap

March 29	Gatineau Olympiques	1–2	Rouyn-Noranda Huskies	Aréna Glencore	Recap

April 1	Rouyn-Noranda Huskies	2–1	Gatineau Olympiques	Centre Slush Puppie	Recap

April 2	Rouyn-Noranda Huskies	2–3	OT	Gatineau Olympiques	Centre Slush Puppie	Recap

April 4	Gatineau Olympiques	4–8	Rouyn-Noranda Huskies	Aréna Glencore	Recap
Nicolas Petrut (1) - pp - 2:05		First period	6:56 - Samuel Rousseau (1); 19:01 - pp - Lars Steiner (2); 19:50 - Antonin Verreault (1)
Maxim Dubé (2) - 8:43; William-Alexis Tremblay (1) - 12:06; Jan Goličič (1) - pp - 18:06		Second period	0:51 - Samuel Beauchemin (3); 1:57 - Benjamin Brunelle (3); 8:00 - Antonin Verreault (2); 16:00 - Bill Zonnon (2); 17:26 - Ty Higgins (1)
No scoring		Third period	No scoring
Iain Wintle (6 saves / 11 shots); Xavier Delisle (20 saves / 23 shots)		Goalie stats	Samuel Meloche (14 saves / 18 shots); Zach Pelletier (4 saves / 4 shots)

Rouyn-Noranda wins series 4 – 1

==== (3) Shawinigan Cataractes vs. (6) Val-d'Or Foreurs ====
March 28	Val-d'Or Foreurs	2–3	Shawinigan Cataractes	Centre Gervais Auto	Recap
Noah Reinhart (1) - 7:29		First period	9:57 - Cole Chandler (1)
No scoring		Second period	No scoring
Philippe Veilleux (1) - 0:11		Third period	10:18 - Vince Elie (1); 14:01 - Vince Elie (2)
Émile Beaunoyer (28 saves / 31 shots)		Goalie stats	Mathys Fernandez (19 saves / 21 shots)

March 29	Val-d'Or Foreurs	2–5	Shawinigan Cataractes	Centre Gervais Auto	Recap
Samuel Fiala (1) - 11:46		First period	12:42 - Jordan Forget (1); 18:22 - pp - Jordan Forget (2)
No scoring		Second period	0:42 - Julien Lanthier (1)
Noah Reinhart (2) - 16:41		Third period	1:36 - Mathieu Plante (1); 17:48 - en - Matvei Gridin (1)
Émile Beaunoyer (27 saves / 31 shots); Cédric Massé (10 saves / 10 shots)		Goalie stats	Mathys Fernandez (26 saves / 28 shots)

April 1	Shawinigan Cataractes	3–4	OT	Val-d'Or Foreurs	Centre Agnico Eagle	Recap

April 2	Shawinigan Cataractes	4–0	Val-d'Or Foreurs	Centre Agnico Eagle	Recap

April 4	Shawinigan Cataractes	5–2	Val-d'Or Foreurs	Centre Agnico Eagle	Recap

Shawinigan wins series 4 – 1

==== (4) Blainville-Boisbriand Armada vs. (5) Sherbrooke Phoenix ====
March 27	Sherbrooke Phoenix	5–1	Blainville-Boisbriand Armada	Centre d'Excellence Sports Rousseau	Recap
No scoring		First period	No scoring
Hugo Marcil (1) - 7:22; Hugo Primeau (1) - 12:07		Second period	11:01 - Egor Goriunov (1)
Alexis Doucet (1) - 7:06; Thomas Rousseau (1) - 11:56; Charles-Antoine Beauregard (1) - 17:53		Third period	No scoring
Linards Feldbergs (30 saves / 31 shots)		Goalie stats	Félix Hamel (16 saves / 21 shots)

March 28	Sherbrooke Phoenix	2–3	Blainville-Boisbriand Armada	Centre d'Excellence Sports Rousseau	Recap
Chad Bellemare (1) - 14:59		First period	No scoring
No scoring		Second period	7:34 - Justin Carbonneau (1); 15:07 - Justin Carbonneau (2); 18:37 - pp - Mateo Nobert (1)
Hugo Primeau (2) - pp - 1:02		Third period	No scoring
Linards Feldbergs (26 saves / 29 shots)		Goalie stats	Félix Hamel (31 saves / 33 shots)

April 1	Blainville-Boisbriand Armada	4–6	Sherbrooke Phoenix	Palais des Sports Léopold-Drolet	Recap
Félix Hamel (23 saves / 28 shots)		Goalie stats	Linards Feldbergs (36 saves / 40 shots)

April 2	Blainville-Boisbriand Armada	3–4	2OT	Sherbrooke Phoenix	Palais des Sports Léopold-Drolet	Recap
Olivier Metcalfe (2) - pp - 2:46; Egor Goriunov (2) - pp - 9:32		First period		11:24 - pp - Robin Benoit (1)
Ludovik Grenier (1) - 10:16		Second period		5:59 - Louis-Alex Tremblay (2)
No scoring		Third period		7:05 - Robin Benoit (2)
No scoring		Second overtime period		3:01 - Jean-Félix Lapointe (1)
Félix Hamel (38 saves / 42 shots)		Goalie stats		Linards Feldbergs (43 saves / 46 shots)

April 4	Sherbrooke Phoenix	2–1	OT	Blainville-Boisbriand Armada	Centre d'Excellence Sports Rousseau	Recap
No scoring		First period		No scoring
Mateo Nobert (2) - pp - 2:08		Second period		No scoring
No scoring		Third period		1:54 - Mavrick Lachance (3)
No scoring		First overtime period		6:42 - Hugo Primeau (3)
Linards Feldbergs (33 saves / 34 shots)		Goalie stats		Vincent Gladu (25 saves / 27 shots)

Sherbrooke wins series 4 – 1

=== Eastern Conference quarterfinals ===
==== (1) Moncton Wildcats vs. (8) Quebec Remparts ====
March 28	Quebec Remparts	3–4	OT	Moncton Wildcats	Avenir Centre	Recap
Antoine Dorion (1) - 5:35		First period		3:11 - Dylan MacKinnon (1); 16:33 - Julius Sumpf (1)
No scoring		Second period		No scoring
Thomas Auger (1) - 10:01; Justin Côté (1) - pp - 11:38		Third period		16:10 - Gabe Smith (1)
No scoring		First overtime period		1:38 - Julius Sumpf (2)
Louis-Antoine Denault (39 saves / 43 shots)		Goalie stats		Mathis Rousseau (22 saves / 25 shots)

March 29	Quebec Remparts	0–4	Moncton Wildcats	Avenir Centre	Recap
No scoring		First period	No scoring
No scoring		Second period	No scoring
No scoring		Third period	2:00 - Étienne Morin (1); 13:00 - Julius Sumpf (3); 15:17 - pp - Caleb Desnoyers (1); 16:08 - en - Preston Lounsbury (1)
Louis-Antoine Denault (38 saves / 41 shots)		Goalie stats	Rudy Guimond (33 saves / 33 shots)

April 1	Moncton Wildcats	4–3	OT	Quebec Remparts	Videotron Centre	Recap
Dyllan Gill (1) - 19:15		First period		13:52 - Justin Côté (2)
Gabe Smith (2) - pp - 10:59; Caleb Desnoyers (2) - pp - 12:09		Second period		17:24 - Nathan Quinn (1)
No scoring		Third period		4:16 - Mathias Loiselle (1)
Gabe Smith (3) - 8:34		First overtime period		No scoring
Mathis Rousseau (25 saves / 28 shots)		Goalie stats		Louis-Antoine Denault (40 saves / 44 shots)

April 2	Moncton Wildcats	4–3	Quebec Remparts	Videotron Centre	Recap
Gabe Smith (4) - 4:55; Maxime Côté (1) - 9:35; Juraj Pekarčík (1) - 11:14		First period	No scoring
No scoring		Second period	11:59 - pp - Justin Côté (3); 19:07 - Thomas Auger (2)
Alex Mercier (1) - pp - 4:46		Third period	18:54 - Justin Côté (4)
Rudy Guimond (20 saves / 23 shots)		Goalie stats	Louis-Antoine Denault (14 saves / 17 shots); Patrick Deniger (7 saves / 8 shots)

Moncton wins series 4 – 0

==== (2) Rimouski Océanic vs. (7) Charlottetown Islanders ====
March 28	Charlottetown Islanders	2–6	Rimouski Océanic	Colisée Financière Sun Life	Recap
William Shields (1) - pp - 1:18; Simon Hughes (1) - 17:43		First period	10:00 - pp - Mathieu Cataford (1)
No scoring		Second period	1:34 - Jacob Mathieu (1); 2:52 - Mathieu Cataford (2)
No scoring		Third period	3:09 - Mathieu Cataford (3); 7:47 - Maxime Coursol (1); 18:55 - pp - Jacob Mathieu (2)
Nicolas Ruccia (33 saves / 39 shots)		Goalie stats	Mathis Langevin (15 saves / 17 shots)

March 29	Charlottetown Islanders	0–10	Rimouski Océanic	Colisée Financière Sun Life	Recap
No scoring		First period	10:57 - Dominic Pilote (1); 12:23 - Maël Lavigne (1)
No scoring		Second period	3:25 - Jacob Mathieu (3); 5:56 - Lou Lévesque (1); 9:32 - pp - Jacob Mathieu (4); 12:02 - pp - Eriks Mateiko (1)
No scoring		Third period	0:48 - Jacob Mathieu (5); 9:07 - Mathieu Cataford (4); 12:08 - Lou Lévesque (2); 13:40 - Alexandre Blais (1)
Nicolas Ruccia (13 saves / 17 shots); Donald Hickey (26 saves / 32 shots)		Goalie stats	Mathis Langevin (27 saves / 27 shots)

April 1	Rimouski Océanic	4–0	Charlottetown Islanders	Eastlink Centre	Recap
Pier-Olivier Roy (1) - pp - 6:06		First period	No scoring
Jonathan Fauchon (1) - pp - 1:11; Mathys Dubé (1) - 11:24		Second period	No scoring
Jonathan Fauchon (2) - pp - 6:31		Third period	No scoring
Mathis Langevin (22 saves / 22 shots)		Goalie stats	Donald Hickey (22 saves / 26 shots)

April 2	Rimouski Océanic	4–1	Charlottetown Islanders	Eastlink Centre	Recap
Jacob Mathieu (6) - pp - 5:53		First period	16:29 - Maxwell Jardine (1)
Maël St-Denis (1) - pp - 5:56		Second period	No scoring
Maël Lavigne (2) - 11:11; Mathieu Cataford (5) - pp - 16:40		Third period	No scoring
Mathis Langevin (26 saves / 27 shots)		Goalie stats	Nicolas Ruccia (34 saves / 38 shots)

Rimouski wins series 4 – 0

==== (3) Chicoutimi Saguenéens vs. (6) Acadie–Bathurst Titan ====
March 28	Acadie–Bathurst Titan	2–3	Chicoutimi Saguenéens	Centre Georges-Vézina	Recap

March 29	Acadie–Bathurst Titan	0–2	Chicoutimi Saguenéens	Centre Georges-Vézina	Recap

April 1	Chicoutimi Saguenéens	4–3	OT	Acadie–Bathurst Titan	K.C. Irving Regional Centre	Recap

April 2	Chicoutimi Saguenéens	1–2	Acadie–Bathurst Titan	K.C. Irving Regional Centre	Recap

April 4	Chicoutimi Saguenéens	5–1	Acadie–Bathurst Titan	K.C. Irving Regional Centre	Recap

Chicoutimi wins series 4 – 1

==== (4) Baie-Comeau Drakkar vs. (5) Cape Breton Eagles ====
March 28	Cape Breton Eagles	1–3	Baie-Comeau Drakkar	Centre Henry-Leonard	Recap
Angelo Fullerton (1) - 16:18		First period	1:39 - Evan Courtois (1)
No scoring		Second period	1:52 - Skogen Schrott (1)
No scoring		Third period	4:23 - Skogen Schrott (2)
Alexis Cournoyer (18 saves / 21 shots)		Goalie stats	Lucas Beckman (37 saves / 38 shots)

March 29	Cape Breton Eagles	2–5	Baie-Comeau Drakkar	Centre Henry-Leonard	Recap
Andrew Brown (1) - pp - 7:49		First period	No scoring
Andrew Brown (2) - 18:47		Second period	4:36 - sh - Justin Gendron (1); 7:41 - pp - Louis-Charles Plourde (1); 16:48 - Skogen Schrott (3)
No scoring		Third period	8:22 - Samuel Boisvert (1); 19:06 - en - Anthony Lavoie (1)
Alexis Cournoyer (26 saves / 30 shots)		Goalie stats	Lucas Beckman (32 saves / 34 shots)

April 1	Baie-Comeau Drakkar	1–5	Cape Breton Eagles	Centre 200	Recap
No scoring		First period	13:21 - pp - Cole Burbidge (1)
Matyáš Melovský (1) - pp - 7:07		Second period	3:06 - Romain Litalien (1); 5:19 - Lucas Romeo (1); 8:10 - Jacob Newcombe (1); 19:46 - pp - Jacob Newcombe (2)
No scoring		Third period	No scoring
Lucas Beckman (18 saves / 23 shots)		Goalie stats	Jakub Milota (23 saves / 24 shots)

April 2	Baie-Comeau Drakkar	4–0	Cape Breton Eagles	Centre 200	Recap
Raoul Boilard (1) - 15:11		First period	No scoring
Justin Gendron (2) - 4:18		Second period	No scoring
Samuel Boisvert (2) - 2:30; Justin Gendron (3) - en - 18:06		Third period	No scoring
Lucas Beckman (30 saves / 30 shots)		Goalie stats	Jakub Milota (32 saves / 35 shots)

April 4	Baie-Comeau Drakkar	2–3	5OT	Cape Breton Eagles	Centre 200	Recap
19:12 - Matyáš Melovský (2)		First period		Xavier Daigle (1) - pp - 15:08
11:05 - Raoul Boilard (2)		Second period		No scoring
No scoring		Third period		Lucas Romeo (2) - 5:01
No scoring		Fifth overtime period		Angelo Fullerton (2) - 1:42
Lucas Beckman (54 saves / 57 shots)		Goalie stats		Jakub Milota (84 saves / 86 shots)

April 7	Cape Breton Eagles	1–6	Baie-Comeau Drakkar	Centre Henry-Leonard	Recap
No scoring		First period	Louis-Charles Plourde (2) - 4:32
5:07 - Aiden McCullough (1)		Second period	Alexis Michaud (1) - 8:00
No scoring		Third period	Justin Gendron (4) - 4:03; Louis-Charles Plourde (3) - 15:24; Matyáš Melovský (3) - en - 15:57; Oliver Samson (1) - 17:22
Jakub Milota (34 saves / 39 shots)		Goalie stats	Lucas Beckman (20 saves / 21 shots)

Baie-Comeau wins series 4 – 2

== Conference semifinals ==
=== Eastern Conference semifinals ===
==== (1) Moncton Wildcats vs. (4) Baie-Comeau Drakkar ====
April 11	Baie-Comeau Drakkar	0–7	Moncton Wildcats	Avenir Centre	Recap

April 13	Baie-Comeau Drakkar	1–4	Moncton Wildcats	Avenir Centre	Recap

April 15	Moncton Wildcats	2–5	Baie-Comeau Drakkar	Centre Henry-Leonard	Recap

April 16	Moncton Wildcats	4–3	2OT	Baie-Comeau Drakkar	Centre Henry-Leonard	Recap

April 18	Moncton Wildcats	5–4	Baie-Comeau Drakkar	Centre Henry-Leonard	Recap

Moncton wins series 4 – 1

==== (2) Rimouski Océanic vs. (3) Chicoutimi Saguenéens ====
April 11	Chicoutimi Saguenéens	2–5	Rimouski Océanic	Colisée Financière Sun Life	Recap

April 12	Chicoutimi Saguenéens	2–3	OT	Rimouski Océanic	Colisée Financière Sun Life	Recap

April 15	Rimouski Océanic	0–3	Chicoutimi Saguenéens	Centre Georges-Vézina	Recap

April 16	Rimouski Océanic	2–3	OT	Chicoutimi Saguenéens	Centre Georges-Vézina	Recap

April 18	Chicoutimi Saguenéens	2–3	Rimouski Océanic	Colisée Financière Sun Life	Recap

April 20	Rimouski Océanic	4–1	Chicoutimi Saguenéens	Centre Georges-Vézina	Recap

Rimouski wins series 4 – 2

=== Western Conference semifinals ===
==== (2) Rouyn-Noranda Huskies vs. (8) Halifax Mooseheads ====
April 11	Halifax Mooseheads	1–4	Rouyn-Noranda Huskies	Aréna Glencore	Recap

April 12	Halifax Mooseheads	0–5	Rouyn-Noranda Huskies	Aréna Glencore	Recap

April 15	Rouyn-Noranda Huskies	4–1	Halifax Mooseheads	Scotiabank Centre	Recap

April 16	Rouyn-Noranda Huskies	5–1	Halifax Mooseheads	Scotiabank Centre	Recap

Rouyn-Noranda wins series 4 – 0

==== (3) Shawinigan Cataractes vs. (5) Sherbrooke Phoenix ====
April 11	Sherbrooke Phoenix	4–5	Shawinigan Cataractes	Centre Gervais Auto	Recap

April 12	Sherbrooke Phoenix	2–5	Shawinigan Cataractes	Centre Gervais Auto	Recap

April 15	Shawinigan Cataractes	5–2	Sherbrooke Phoenix	Palais des Sports Léopold-Drolet	Recap

April 16	Shawinigan Cataractes	3–2	OT	Sherbrooke Phoenix	Palais des Sports Léopold-Drolet	Recap

Shawinigan wins series 4 – 0

== Semifinals ==
=== (1) Moncton Wildcats vs. (6) Rouyn-Noranda Huskies ===
April 24	Rouyn-Noranda Huskies	3–5	Moncton Wildcats	Avenir Centre	Recap
Samuel Beauchemin (5) – 13:07		First period	No scoring
Ty Higgins (4) – 18:13		Second period	1:37 – pp – Markus Vidicek (3); 2:15 – Caleb Desnoyers (7)
Bill Zonnon (7) – pp – 9:21		Third period	2:37 – Loke Johansson (1); 7:39 – Maxime Côté (2); 19:06 – en – Julius Sumpf (8)
Samuel Meloche (19 saves / 23 shots)		Goalie stats	Mathis Rousseau (36 saves / 39 shots)

April 25	Rouyn-Noranda Huskies	1–2	Moncton Wildcats	Avenir Centre	Recap
No scoring		First period	No scoring
Bill Zonnon (8) – 18:51		Second period	No scoring
No scoring		Third period	4:43 – Natan Grenier (3); 5:23 – Preston Lounsbury (4)
Samuel Meloche (25 saves / 27 shots)		Goalie stats	Rudy Guimond (28 saves / 29 shots)

April 29	Moncton Wildcats	4–3	Rouyn-Noranda Huskies	Aréna Glencore	Recap
Dyllan Gill (2) – 0:11		First period	No scoring
Preston Lounsbury (5) – 6:11; Preston Lounsbury (6) – 9:56		Second period	No scoring
Caleb Desnoyers (8) – 10:20		Third period	3:51 – Alex Carr (3); 8:40 – Antonin Verreault (3); 12:34 – pp – Thomas Verdon (2)
Mathis Rousseau (38 saves / 41 shots)		Goalie stats	Samuel Meloche (18 saves / 22 shots)

April 30	Moncton Wildcats	4–3	OT	Rouyn-Noranda Huskies	Aréna Glencore	Recap
Caleb Desnoyers (9) – 4:17		First period		No scoring
Alex Mercier (2) – pp – 18:01; Juraj Pekarcik (6) – 19:22		Second period		0:21 – Lars Steiner (4); 3:41 – Alexis Lemire (2)
No scoring		Third period		18:10 – Rémi Gélinas (6)
Alex Mercier (3) – 4:17		First overtime period		No scoring
Rudy Guimond (32 saves / 35 shots)		Goalie stats		Samuel Meloche (36 saves / 40 shots)

Moncton wins series 4 – 0

=== (2) Rimouski Océanic vs. (4) Shawinigan Cataractes ===
April 25	Shawinigan Cataractes	1–5	Rimouski Océanic	Colisée Financière Sun Life	Recap
Vince Elie (4) – 19:15		First period	10:32 – Maël St-Denis (2); 17:57 – Jacob Mathieu (9)
No scoring		Second period	6:50 – Lou Lévesque (6)
No scoring		Third period	14:49 – Pier-Olivier Roy (3); 19:52 – Thomas Belzil (1)
Mathys Fernandez (30 saves / 35 shots)		Goalie stats	Mathis Langevin (33 saves / 34 shots)

April 27	Shawinigan Cataractes	0–7	Rimouski Océanic	Colisée Financière Sun Life	Recap
No scoring		First period	15:28 – Dominic Pilote (3)
No scoring		Second period	7:47 – Jack Martin (1); 10:31 – Jacob Mathieu (10); 13:02 – pp – Eriks Mateiko (4)
No scoring		Third period	5:25 – Jacob Mathieu (11); 7:29 – Alexandre Blais (3); 16:02 – Mathys Dubé (3)
Mathys Fernandez (20 saves / 24 shots); Owen Bresson (14 saves / 17 shots)		Goalie stats	Mathis Langevin (24 saves / 24 shots)

April 29	Rimouski Océanic	2–5	Shawinigan Cataractes	Centre Gervais Auto	Recap
Maël Lavigne (5) – 19:44		First period	19:23 – Matvei Gridin (7)
Mathys Dubé (4) – 7:36		Second period	5:14 – Jordan Tourigny (2); 11:45 – Yoan Loshing (5); 19:37 – Yoan Loshing (6)
No scoring		Third period	16:29 – Louis-Philippe Fontaine (2)
Mathis Langevin (3 saves / 3 shots); William Lacelle (21 saves / 26 shots)		Goalie stats	Mathys Fernandez (26 saves / 28 shots)

April 30	Rimouski Océanic	2–3	2OT	Shawinigan Cataractes	Centre Gervais Auto	Recap
Basile Sansonnens (1) – 1:41		First period		12:10 – Brogan McNeil (1)
No scoring		Second period		12:56 – Kody Dupuis (3)
Maxime Coursol (4) – pp – 18:46		Third period		No scoring
No scoring		Second overtime period		2:00 – Isaac Ménard (1)
William Lacelle (49 saves / 52 shots)		Goalie stats		Mathys Fernandez (39 saves / 41 shots)

May 2	Shawinigan Cataractes	2–3	OT	Rimouski Océanic	Colisée Financière Sun Life	Recap
Matvei Gridin (8) – 12:08		First period		No scoring
No scoring		Second period		17:39 – Eriks Mateiko (5)
Cole Chandler (4) – 9:51		Third period		11:32 – pp – Alexandre Blais (4)
No scoring		First overtime period		17:59 – Maël Lavigne (6)
Mathys Fernandez (53 saves / 56 shots)		Goalie stats		William Lacelle (39 saves / 41 shots)

May 4	Rimouski Océanic	1–5	Shawinigan Cataractes	Centre Gervais Auto	Recap
No scoring		First period	7:36 – Vince Elie (5)
Jacob Mathieu (12) – 5:01		Second period	6:20 – Jiri Klima (3); 14:34 – pp – Louis-Philippe Fontaine (3)
No scoring		Third period	17:12 – Jiri Klima (4); 19:08 – Jordan Forget (4)
William Lacelle (25 saves / 30 shots)		Goalie stats	Mathys Fernandez (21 saves / 22 shots)

May 6	Shawinigan Cataractes	3–4	2OT	Rimouski Océanic	Colisée Financière Sun Life	Recap
No scoring		First period		No scoring
Cole Chandler (5) – 17:45		Second period		5:49 – Jack Martin (2); 6:21 – Alexandre Blais (5); 13:59 – Jacob Mathieu (13)
Vince Elie (6) – pp – 5:15; Isaac Ménard (2) – 16:23		Third period		No scoring
No scoring		Second overtime period		17:08 – Eriks Mateiko (6)
Mathys Fernandez (39 saves / 43 shots)		Goalie stats		William Lacelle (44 saves / 47 shots)

Rimouski wins series 4 – 3

== Gilles-Courteau Trophy championship ==
=== (1) Moncton Wildcats vs. (2) Rimouski Océanic ===
May 10	Rimouski Océanic	1–4	Moncton Wildcats	Avenir Centre	Recap
No scoring		First period	5:46 – Juraj Pekarcik (7)
No scoring		Second period	6:22 – Markus Vidicek (4); 17:57 – pp – Vincent Collard (2)
Maxime Coursol (5) – 8:36		Third period	18:53 – en – Preston Lounsbury
Mathis Langevin (34 saves / 37 shots)		Goalie stats	Mathis Rousseau (13 saves / 14 shots)

May 11	Rimouski Océanic	3–4	2OT	Moncton Wildcats	Avenir Centre	Recap
Jack Martin (3) – 11:21; Mathieu Cataford (6) – 19:22		First period		7:03 – Julius Sumpf (9)
No scoring		Second period		9:51 – pp – Markus Vidicek (5)
Jonathan Fauchon (4) – 17:20		Third period		5:03 – Juraj Pekarcik (8)
No scoring		Second overtime period		2:34 – Vincent Collard (3)
William Lacelle (42 saves / 46 shots)		Goalie stats		Rudy Guimond (28 saves / 31 shots)

May 14	Moncton Wildcats	6–4	Rimouski Océanic	Colisée Financière Sun Life	Recap
Vincent Collard (4) – 7:07; Juraj Pekarcik (9) – 8:43		First period	No scoring
Vincent Collard (5) – sh – 6:55; Etienne Morin (2) – pp – 14:48; Vincent Collard (6) – pp – 16:22		Second period	2:52 – Mathieu Cataford (7); 4:40 – Maël Lavigne (7); 13:17 – pp – Jonathan Fauchon
Vincent Collard (7) – 4:55		Third period	12:52 – Jacob Mathieu (14)
Mathis Rousseau (43 saves / 37 shots)		Goalie stats	William Lacelle (11 saves / 16 shots); Mathis Langevin (8 saves / 9 shots)

May 15	Moncton Wildcats	1–5	Rimouski Océanic	Colisée Financière Sun Life	Recap
No scoring		First period	1:04 – Maël Lavigne (8); 4:20 – pp – Maxime Coursol (6); 7:08 – Maël St-Denis (3); 18:15 – pp – Jonathan Fauchon (6)
No scoring		Second period	19:10 – Eriks Mateiko (7)
Julius Sumpf (10) – 16:58		Third period	No scoring
Rudy Guimond (10 saves / 13 shots); Mathis Rousseau (25 saves / 27 shots)		Goalie stats	Mathis Langevin (29 saves / 30 shots)

May 17	Rimouski Océanic	3–1	Moncton Wildcats	Avenir Centre	Recap
Jacob Mathieu (15) – 15:05		First period	18:15 – Preston Lounsbury (8)
Maël Lavigne (9) – 9:05		Second period	No scoring
Jacob Mathieu (16) – en – 18:41		Third period	No scoring
Mathis Langevin (33 saves / 34 shots)		Goalie stats	Mathis Rousseau (20 saves / 22 shots)

May 19	Moncton Wildcats	3–2	Rimouski Océanic	Colisée Financière Sun Life	Recap
No scoring		First period	No scoring
Gabe Smith (5) – 6:30; Loke Johansson (2) – 8:11; Gabe Smith (6) – 17:46		Second period	No scoring
No scoring		Third period	7:11 – Jonathan Fauchon (7); 11:32 – pp – Jacob Mathieu (17)
Mathis Rousseau (24 saves / 26 shots)		Goalie stats	Mathis Langevin (30 saves / 33 shots)

Moncton wins series 4 – 2

== Playoff scoring leaders ==
Note: GP = Games played; G = Goals; A = Assists; Pts = Points; PIM = Penalties minutes

Player	Team	GP	G	A	Pts	PIM
Jacob Mathieu	Rimouski Océanic	23	17	14	31	18
Caleb Desnoyers	Moncton Wildcats	19	9	21	30	14
Jonathan Fauchon	Rimouski Océanic	23	7	15	22	4
Gabe Smith	Moncton Wildcats	19	6	16	22	12
Juraj Pekarcik	Moncton Wildcats	19	9	12	21	13
Alexandre Blais	Rimouski Océanic	23	5	15	20	14
Etienne Morin	Moncton Wildcats	19	2	18	20	4
Pier-Olivier Roy	Rimouski Océanic	21	3	16	19	4
Mathieu Cataford	Rimouski Océanic	12	7	11	18	4
Matvei Gridin	Shawinigan Cataractes	16	8	9	17	6

== Playoff leading goaltenders ==
Note: GP = Games played; Mins = Minutes played; W = Wins; L = Losses: OTL = Overtime losses; SL = Shootout losses; GA = Goals Allowed; SO = Shutouts; GAA = Goals against average

Player	Team	GP	Mins	W	L	GA	SO	Sv%	GAA
Mathis Langevin	Rimouski Océanic	18	994:42	12	4	26	3	.944	1.57
Louis-Félix Charrois	Drummondville Voltigeurs	7	387:19	3	4	12	1	.913	1.86
Jakub Milota	Cape Breton Eagles	4	319:52	2	2	11	0	.940	2.06
Samuel Meloche	Rouyn-Noranda Huskies	13	787:25	8	5	27	1	.911	2.06
Raphaël Précourt	Chicoutimi Saguenéens	11	660:11	6	5	24	2	.926	2.18

== Trophies and awards ==
2024–25 QMJHL Awards
Award	Recipient(s)	Ref
Gilles-Courteau Trophy; Playoff champions	Moncton Wildcats	
Jean Rougeau Trophy; Regular season champions	Moncton Wildcats	
Luc Robitaille Trophy; Team with the best goals for average	Moncton Wildcats	
Robert Lebel Trophy; Team with the best goals against average	Moncton Wildcats	
Michel Brière Memorial Trophy; Regular season MVP	Jonathan Fauchon (Blainville-Boisbriand/Rimouski)	
Jean Béliveau Trophy; Top point scorer	Jonathan Fauchon (Blainville-Boisbriand/Rimouski)	
Mario Lemieux Trophy; Top goal scorer	Sam Oliver (Drummondville Voltigeurs)	
Guy Lafleur Trophy; Playoff MVP	Caleb Desnoyers (Moncton Wildcats)	
Patrick Roy Trophy; Goaltender of the Year	Jacob Steinman (Halifax Mooseheads)	
Jacques Plante Memorial Trophy; Goaltender with best goals against average	William Lacelle (Rimouski Océanic)	
Guy Carbonneau Trophy; Best Defensive Forward	Matyas Melovsky (Baie-Comeau Drakkar)	
Emile Bouchard Trophy; Defenceman of the Year	Xavier Villeneuve (Blainville-Boisbriand Armada)	
Kevin Lowe Trophy; Best Defensive Defenceman	Alex Carr (Rouyn-Noranda Huskies)	
Michael Bossy Trophy; Top Prospect	Caleb Desnoyers (Moncton Wildcats)	
Sidney Crosby Trophy; Rookie of the Year	Matvei Gridin (Shawinigan Cataractes)	
Michel Bergeron Trophy; Offensive Rookie of the Year	Matvei Gridin (Shawinigan Cataractes)	
Raymond Lagacé Trophy; Defensive Rookie of the Year	William Lacelle (Rimouski Océanic)	
David Desharnais Trophy; Most Sportsmanlike Player	Julius Sumpf (Moncton Wildcats)	
QMJHL Humanitarian of the Year; Humanitarian of the Year	Max Jardine (Charlottetown Islanders)	
Marcel Robert Trophy; Best Scholastic Player	Mathieu Cataford (Rimouski Océanic)	
Paul Dumont Trophy; Personality of the Year	Caleb Desnoyers (Moncton Wildcats)	
Ron Lapointe Trophy; Coach of the Year	Gardiner MacDougall (Moncton Wildcats)	
Maurice Filion Trophy; General Manager of the Year	Olivier Picard (Blainville-Boisbriand Armada)	

=== All-Star teams ===
First All-Star Team:

- Jacob Steinman, Goaltender, Halifax Mooseheads/Moncton Wildcats
- Xavier Villeneuve, Defenceman, Blainville-Broisbriand Armada
- Alexis Bernier, Defenceman, Baie-Comeau Drakkar
- Jonathan Fauchon, Blainville-Boisbriand Armada/Rimouski Océanic
- Caleb Desnoyers, Forward, Moncton Wildcats
- Justin Carbonneau, Forward, Blainville-Broisbriand Armada

Second All-Star Team

- Riley Mercer, Goaltender, Drummondville Voltigeurs
- Ty Higgins, Defenceman, Rouyn-Noranda Huskies
- Alex Carr, Defenceman, Rouyn-Noranda Huskies
- Antonin Verreault, Forward, Rouyn-Noranda Huskies
- Sam Oliver, Forward, Baie-Comeau Drakkar
- Luke Woodworth, Forward, Drummondville Voltigeurs

All-Rookie Team

- William Lacelle, Goaltender, Rimouski Océanic
- Benjamin Cossette Ayotte, Defenceman, Val-d'Or Foreurs
- Carlos Händel, Defenceman, Halifax Mooseheads
- Matvei Gridin, Forward, Shawinigan Cataractes
- Lars Steiner, Forward, Rouyn-Noranda Huskies
- Thomas Rousseau, Forward, Sherbrooke Phoenix

== See also ==
- List of QMJHL seasons
- 2024–25 OHL season
- 2024–25 WHL season

== Sources ==
- "EDITORIAL: Changes to NCAA, junior hockey will have lasting impact". Rocky Mountain Outlook. Great West Media. 2 December 2024.

Preceded by 2023–24 QMJHL season	QMJHL seasons	Succeeded by 2025–26 QMJHL season
