= Paul Dumont Trophy =

- Description: Annual award presented to the Personality of the Year in the Quebec Maritimes Junior Hockey League
- Country: Canada
- Presented by: Quebec Maritimes Junior Hockey League

The Paul Dumont Trophy is awarded annually to the "Personality of the Year" in the Quebec Maritimes Junior Hockey League (QMJHL). The award can be won by anyone connected to the league, including players and staff. It was named after former league president Paul Dumont.

== Winners ==
Season	Recipient	Team
1989–90	Stéphane Fiset	Victoriaville Tigres
1990–91	Patrice Brisebois	Drummondville Voltigeurs
1991–92	Patrick Poulin	Saint-Hyacinthe Laser
1992–93	Martin Lapointe	Laval Titan
1993–94	Yanick Dubé	Laval Titan
1994–95	Éric Dazé	Beauport Harfangs
1995–96	Christian Dubé	Sherbrooke Faucons
1996–97	Michel Therrien	Granby Prédateurs
1997–98	Mike Ribeiro	Rouyn-Noranda Huskies
1998–99	Simon Gagné	Quebec Remparts
1999–2000	Brad Richards	Rimouski Océanic
2000–01	Simon Gamache	Val-d'Or Foreurs
2001–02	Olivier Michaud	Shawinigan Cataractes
2002–03	Jean-François Plourde	Sherbrooke Castors
2003–04	Sidney Crosby	Rimouski Océanic
2004–05	Sidney Crosby	Rimouski Océanic
2005–06	Clément Jodoin	Lewiston Maineiacs
2006–07	Kris Letang	Val-d'Or Foreurs
2007–08	Martin Mondou	Shawinigan Cataractes
2008–09	Guy Boucher	Drummondville Voltigeurs
2009–10	Joël Chouinard	Victoriaville Tigres
2010–11	Louis Leblanc	Montreal Juniors
2011–12	Jonathan Huberdeau	Saint John Sea Dogs
2012–13	Jonathan Drouin	Halifax Mooseheads
2013–14	Zachary Fucale	Halifax Mooseheads
2014–15	Nikolaj Ehlers	Halifax Mooseheads
2015–16	Pierre-Luc Dubois	Cape Breton Screaming Eagles
2016–17	Thomas Chabot	Saint John Sea Dogs
2017–18	Dominique Ducharme	Drummondville Voltigeurs
2018–19	Alexis Lafrenière	Rimouski Océanic
2019–20	Alexis Lafrenière	Rimouski Océanic
2020–21	Nicolas Sauvé	Blainville-Boisbriand Armada
2021–22	Joshua Roy	Sherbrooke Phoenix
2022–23	Joshua Roy	Sherbrooke Phoenix
2023–24	Émile Chouinard	Baie-Comeau Drakkar
2023–24	Jacob Newcombe	Cape Breton Eagles
2024–25	Caleb Desnoyers	Moncton Wildcats
2025–26	Glenn Stanford	Newfoundland Regiment
