= Mario Lemieux Trophy =

The Mario Lemieux Trophy (French: Trophée Mario-Lemieux) is awarded annually by the Quebec Maritimes Junior Hockey League (QMJHL) to the player who has scored the most goals during the regular season. The trophy was first created for the 2023–24 season, and is named after Mario Lemieux, who played three seasons in the QMJHL from 1981 to 1984 with the Laval Voisins. During the 1983–84 season, Lemieux scored 133 goals in 70 games, setting a league record that still stands. The QMJHL is presently the only component league in the Canadian Hockey League (CHL) that has an award for goal-scoring, as neither the Ontario Hockey League nor the Western Hockey League does so, nor is there an equivalent CHL Award.

== Recipients ==
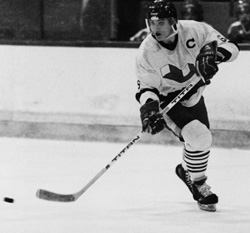
Trophy namesake Lemieux during his record-setting 1983–84 season

Season	Winner	Team	Goals	Ref
2023–24	Justin Poirier	Baie-Comeau Drakkar	51	
2024–25	Sam Oliver	Drummondville Voltigeurs	50	
2025–26	Justin Carbonneau	Blainville-Boisbriand Armada	51	

== See also ==
- Maurice "Rocket" Richard Trophy – National Hockey League equivalent trophy
- Willie Marshall Award – American Hockey League equivalent trophy
- List of Canadian Hockey League awards
