= Justin Carbonneau =

Canadian ice hockey player (born 2006)

- Born: November 25, 2006 (age 19) Lévis, Quebec, Canada
- Height: 6 ft 1 in (185 cm)
- Weight: 203 lb (92 kg; 14 st 7 lb)
- Position: Right wing
- Shoots: Right
- NHL team (P) Cur. team: St. Louis Blues; Springfield Thunderbirds (AHL)
- NHL draft: 19th overall, 2025; St. Louis Blues
- Playing career: 2026–present

Justin Carbonneau (born November 25, 2006) is a Canadian professional ice hockey player for the Springfield Thunderbirds of the American Hockey League (AHL) as a prospect under contract to the St. Louis Blues in the National Hockey League (NHL). He was drafted 19th overall by the Blues in the 2025 NHL entry draft.

== Playing career ==
Carbonneau was drafted 20th overall by the Rouyn-Noranda Huskies in the 2022 QMJHL draft. He played two games for the Huskies before being traded to the Blainville-Boisbriand Armada. During the 2024–25 season, in his draft eligible year, he recorded 46 goals and 43 assists in 62 games. In three seasons in the QMJHL, he recorded 82 goals and 86 assists in 162 games.

On June 27, 2025, he was drafted 19th overall by the St. Louis Blues in the 2025 NHL entry draft. On September 10, 2025, he signed a three-year, two-way entry-level contract with the Blues.

== International play ==
Carbonneau made his international debut for Canada White at the 2023 World U-17 Hockey Challenge where he recorded one assist in six games and won a gold medal.

== Career statistics ==
Bold indicates led league

=== Regular season and playoffs ===
			Regular season					Playoffs
Season	Team	League	GP	G	A	Pts	PIM	GP	G	A	Pts	PIM
2022–23	Rouyn-Noranda Huskies	QMJHL	2	0	2	2	0	—	—	—	—	—
2022–23	Blainville-Boisbriand Armada	QMJHL	30	5	13	18	10	4	0	2	2	2
2023–24	Blainville-Boisbriand Armada	QMJHL	68	31	28	59	32	7	3	3	6	6
2024–25	Blainville-Boisbriand Armada	QMJHL	62	46	43	89	61	5	3	0	3	12
2025–26	Blainville-Boisbriand Armada	QMJHL	60	**51**	29	80	64	17	9	11	20	14
2025–26	Springfield Thunderbirds	AHL	—	—	—	—	—	3	0	0	0	2
QMJHL totals			222	133	115	248	167	33	15	16	31	34

=== International ===
Year	Team	Event	Result	GP	G	A	Pts	PIM
2023	Canada White	U17	1st place, gold medalist(s)	6	0	1	1	2
Junior totals				6	0	1	1	2

Awards and achievements
Preceded by Adam Jiříček	St. Louis Blues first-round draft pick 2025	Succeeded by Tynan Lawrence
