= Eriks Mateiko =

Latvian ice hockey player (born 2005)

- Born: 18 November 2005 (age 20) Jelgava, Latvia
- Height: 6 ft 5 in (196 cm)
- Weight: 208 lb (94 kg; 14 st 12 lb)
- Position: Wing
- Shoots: Left
- NHL team (P) Cur. team: Washington Capitals; Hershey Bears (AHL)
- NHL draft: 90th overall, 2024; Washington Capitals
- Playing career: 2025–present

Eriks Mateiko (Latvian: Ēriks Mateiko; born November 18, 2005) is a Latvian professional ice hockey winger currently playing for the Hershey Bears in the American Hockey League (AHL) while under contract as a prospect to the Washington Capitals of the National Hockey League (NHL). He was drafted 90th overall by the Capitals in the 2024 NHL entry draft.

== Playing career ==
Mateiko was selected 108th overall by the Saint John Sea Dogs in the 2022 CHL Import Draft. He played the 2022–23 season with the Sea Dogs, registering 16 goals and 20 assists in 62 games. His breakout year came in the 2023–24 season, where he improved his performance to 23 goals and 20 assists in 49 games, leading the team in goals.

In the 2024 NHL entry draft, Mateiko was selected 90th overall by the Washington Capitals in the third round. On September 27, 2024, he signed a three-year entry-level contract with the Capitals, set to begin in the 2025–26 season.

During the 2024–25 season, on January 6, 2025, Mateiko was traded by the Sea Dogs to the Rimouski Océanic, to play out his final year of junior hockey.

== International play ==
Mateiko represented Latvia at the U18 World Championships in 2022 and 2023, captaining the team in his second tournament.

He also represented Latvia at the World Juniors in 2024 and 2025. In the 2025 tournament, he led his team in points, scoring five of the team's ten goals, including one in Latvia's 3–2 upset against Canada (he also scored the shootout winner in this game), two in their 4–3 win against Germany, and two in their 3–2 quarterfinal loss to Sweden. Mateiko finished the tournament tied for fourth in goals.

== Career statistics ==
=== Regular season and playoffs ===
			Regular season					Playoffs
Season	Team	League	GP	G	A	Pts	PIM	GP	G	A	Pts	PIM
2022–23	Saint John Sea Dogs	QMJHL	62	16	20	36	25	5	1	0	1	6
2023–24	Saint John Sea Dogs	QMJHL	49	23	20	43	20	—	—	—	—	—
2024–25	Saint John Sea Dogs	QMJHL	23	14	5	19	14	—	—	—	—	—
2024–25	Rimouski Océanic	QMJHL	24	12	10	22	6	18	7	4	11	4
2025–26	Hershey Bears	AHL	27	1	5	6	16	—	—	—	—	—
AHL totals			27	1	5	6	16	—	—	—	—	—

=== International ===
Year	Team	Event	Result	GP	G	A	Pts	PIM
2022	Latvia	U18	7th	4	2	0	2	0
2022	Latvia	WJAC	5th	2	0	0	0	0
2023	Latvia	U18	8th	5	1	1	2	0
2024	Latvia	WJC	8th	5	1	0	1	4
2025	Latvia	WJC	7th	5	5	0	5	0
Junior totals				21	9	1	10	4
