= Caleb Desnoyers =

Canadian ice hockey player (born 2007)

- Born: April 11, 2007 (age 19) Saint-Hyacinthe, Quebec, Canada
- Height: 6 ft 2 in (188 cm)
- Weight: 173 lb (78 kg; 12 st 5 lb)
- Position: Centre
- Shoots: Left
- NHL team (P) Cur. team: Utah Mammoth; Tucson Roadrunners (AHL)
- NHL draft: 4th overall, 2025; Utah Mammoth
- Playing career: 2026–present

Caleb Desnoyers (born April 11, 2007) is a Canadian professional ice hockey player for the Tucson Roadrunners of the American Hockey League (AHL) as a prospect under contract to the Utah Mammoth of the National Hockey League (NHL). He was selected fourth overall by the Mammoth in the 2025 NHL entry draft.

== Playing career ==
Desnoyers played for the Saint-Hyacinthe Gaulois of the Quebec Junior AAA Hockey League at 15 years old. During his first season with the team he recorded 23 goals and 30 assists in 42 games. He ranked second in the league in scoring with 53 points.

On June 9, 2023, Desnoyers was drafted first overall by the Moncton Wildcats in the 2023 QMJHL Draft. During the 2023–24 season, in his rookie season, he recorded 20 goals and 36 assists in 60 regular season games. Among rookies, he ranked third in points, power-play assists (18) and face-off efficiency (53.9%). Following the season he was named to the Rookie All-Star Team. He was also named a finalist for the Michel Bergeron Trophy, awarded to the QMJHL's rookie of the year.

On October 22, 2024, Desnoyers was selected to compete in the CHL/USA Prospects Challenge. On November 3, 2024, he scored his first career hat-trick. He finished the week with five goals and three assists in three games and was subsequently named to the QMJHL Team of the Week for the week ending November 5, 2024. The 2024–25 season marked a breakout for Desnoyers, who finished fifth in scoring during the regular season with 84 points in 56 games, helping his team to win the Jean Rougeau Trophy. He was a finalist for the Michel Brière Memorial Trophy, awarded to the most valuable player of the season, and was named a First Team All-Star. As well, he received the Paul Dumont Trophy as the QMJHL personality of the year. In the QMJHL playoffs, the Wildcats embarked on a deep run to the Finals, where they defeated the Rimouski Océanic in six games to claim the Gilles-Courteau Trophy as league champions. In 19 playoff games, Desnoyers had 9 goals and 21 assists, with his 30 points being second in postseason scoring. He received the Guy Lafleur Trophy as the most valuable player of the playoffs, becoming the first player to do so in their draft-eligible season since Jonathan Drouin in 2013. As QMJHL champions, the Wildcats competed at the 2025 Memorial Cup, losing in the semi-final to the OHL's London Knights. Desnoyers had a goal and an assist in four tournament games.

Following his successful season, Desnoyers received the Michael Bossy Trophy, awarded to the player considered the QMJHL's top prospect for the 2025 NHL entry draft. He was also named Wildcats captain ahead of the 2025–26 QMJHL season, despite not sure whether he wanted to return to Moncton, go straight to the NHL, or take the NCAA route. Desnoyers was selected fourth overall in the 2025 NHL entry draft by the Utah Mammoth. He revealed in August 2025 that he had been dealing with wrist issues all of the previous season and underwent wrist surgery to resolve these problems, with recovery time projected at 12 weeks, which included missing the beginning of the 2025–26 NHL season. He was assigned back to Moncton on September 26 from the Mammoth's training camp as a part of their cuts.

On March 23, 2026 the Mammoth announced that they had signed Desnoyers to a 3-year, entry-level contract that begins at the start of the 2026–27 season.

== International play ==
Medal record

Representing Canada

Ice hockey

World Junior Championships
Bronze medal – third place	2026 United States	

World U18 Championships
Gold medal – first place	2024 Finland	

On October 23, 2023, Desnoyers was selected to represent Canada White at the 2023 World U-17 Hockey Challenge. During the tournament he recorded three goals and two assists in eight games and won a gold medal.

On April 16, 2024, Desnoyers was selected to represent Canada at the 2024 IIHF World U18 Championships. During the tournament he recorded one goal and four assists in five games and won a gold medal. In August 2024, he represented Canada at the 2024 Hlinka Gretzky Cup. During the tournament he recorded one goal and four assists in five games and won his third gold medal in nine months.

In December 2025, he was selected to represent Canada at the 2026 World Junior Ice Hockey Championships. During the tournament he recorded six assists in seven games and won a bronze medal.

== Personal life ==
Desnoyers' father, David, played major junior ice hockey in the Quebec Major Junior Hockey League (QMJHL) for the now-defunct Saint-Hyacinthe Laser. His older brother, Elliot, is a professional ice hockey player for the Iowa Wild of the American Hockey League.

== Career statistics ==
=== Regular season and playoffs ===
			Regular season					Playoffs
Season	Team	League	GP	G	A	Pts	PIM	GP	G	A	Pts	PIM
2023–24	Moncton Wildcats	QMJHL	60	20	36	56	26	4	1	1	2	2
2024–25	Moncton Wildcats	QMJHL	56	35	49	84	39	19	9	21	30	14
2025–26	Moncton Wildcats	QMJHL	45	22	56	78	36	21	7	18	25	16
QMJHL totals			161	77	141	218	101	44	17	40	57	32

=== International ===
Year	Team	Event	Result	GP	G	A	Pts	PIM
2023	Canada White	U17	1st place, gold medalist(s)	8	3	2	5	4
2024	Canada	HG18	1st place, gold medalist(s)	5	1	4	5	6
2024	Canada	U18	1st place, gold medalist(s)	5	1	4	5	8
2026	Canada	WJC	3rd place, bronze medalist(s)	7	0	6	6	4
Junior totals				25	5	16	21	22

== Awards and honours ==
Award	Year	Ref
QMJHL
All-Rookie Team	2024	
First All-Star Team	2025	
Paul Dumont Trophy	2025	
Gilles-Courteau Trophy champion	2025	
Guy Lafleur Trophy	2025	
Michael Bossy Trophy	2025	

Awards and achievements
Preceded by Cole Beaudoin	Utah Mammoth first-round draft pick 2025	Succeeded by Ethan Belchetz
