= Xavier Villeneuve =

Canadian ice hockey player (born 2007)

- Born: September 29, 2007 (age 18) Les Cèdres, Quebec, Canada
- Height: 5 ft 11 in (180 cm)
- Weight: 162 lb (73 kg; 11 st 8 lb)
- Position: Defence
- Shoots: Left
- QMJHL team: Blainville-Boisbriand Armada
- NHL draft: 34th overall, 2026; Chicago Blackhawks

Xavier Villeneuve (born September 29, 2007) is a Canadian ice hockey defenceman for the Blainville-Boisbriand Armada of the Quebec Maritimes Junior Hockey League (QMJHL). He was selected 34th overall by the Chicago Blackhawks in the 2026 NHL entry draft.

== Playing career ==
In 2021–22, Villeneuve played with the Lac St-Louis Grenadiers M15 AAA team, scoring 23 points in 27 games played. The next year, he played in the U.S., joining the Pittsburgh Penguins Elite U15 program, affiliated with the NHL team. Appearing in 48 games, he posted five goals and 18 assists for 23 points. After the season, he was selected in the first round of the 2023 Quebec Maritimes Junior Hockey League (QMJHL) draft by the Blainville-Boisbriand Armada. During the 2023–24 season with the Armada, Villeneuve appeared in 54 games, posting eight goals and 43 points which led all rookie defencemen in the league. He was named the QMJHL Defensive Rookie of the Year for his performance.

In 2024–25, Villeneuve posted 12 goals and 50 assists in 61 games and was named the Emile Bouchard Trophy winner as the league's best defenceman. He was also named a third-team CHL All-Star. He returned to the Armada for the 2025–26 season and scored 36 points in the first 35 games.

Villeneuve is considered a top prospect eligible for the 2026 NHL entry draft. In October 2025, he received an "A" rating from the NHL Central Scouting Bureau, indicating his status as a first-round prospect.

== International play ==
Medal record

Representing Canada

Ice hockey

World U18 Championship
Gold medal – first place	2025 United States	

Villeneuve was selected to represent Canada at the 2023 World U-17 Hockey Challenge. In seven games there, he recorded three assists. He also participated for Canada at the 2025 IIHF World U18 Championships, posting four goals and four assists in eight games while winning the championship.

== Career statistics ==
			Regular season					Playoffs
Season	Team	League	GP	G	A	Pts	PIM	GP	G	A	Pts	PIM
2023–24	Blainville-Boisbriand Armada	QMJHL	54	8	35	43	26	7	1	4	5	0
2024–25	Blainville-Boisbriand Armada	QMJHL	61	12	50	62	24	5	0	4	4	0
2025–26	Blainville-Boisbriand Armada	QMJHL	37	6	32	38	35	17	6	8	14	14
QMJHL totals			152	26	117	143	85	29	7	16	23	14

== Personal life ==
Villeneuve was born on September 29, 2007, in Les Cèdres, Quebec. At age four, his father enrolled him in figure skating classes, which he disliked. He said that, at first, "I was on the ice and I was crying and screaming. I really didn't love it," but after trying out ice hockey soon after, "I started to love it. He couldn't get me off the ice." Xavier is the nephew of Steve Maltais.
