= Christian LaRue =

Canadian ice hockey coach

Christian La Rue
- Born: 1970 or 1971 (age 53–54)
- Occupation: Ice hockey coach
- Known for: Head coach of Moncton Wildcats (2002–05)

Christian La Rue (born 1970 or 1971) is a Canadian ice hockey coach. He was head coach of the Moncton Wildcats of the Quebec Major Junior Hockey League (2002–05) and before that of the Chicoutimi Saguenéens (1996–97). In May 2005 la Rue was named head coach of the Saint John Sea Dogs of the Quebec Major Junior Hockey League (QMJHL), an appointment that was, however, to last less than a year.

On the international scene, La Rue was an assistant coach for the Canadian team at the International Ice Hockey Federation's World Under 18 Hockey Championship in the Czech Republic in June 2005 when Canada brought home a silver medal. He was also an assistant coach with the national under 18 team when it won a gold medal at the 2000 summer championship.
