= Nikita Prishchepov =

Russian ice hockey player (born 2004)

- Born: 20 February 2004 (age 22) Orenburg, Russia
- Height: 6 ft 1 in (185 cm)
- Weight: 194 lb (88 kg; 13 st 12 lb)
- Position: Center
- Shoots: Left
- NHL team (P) Cur. team: Colorado Avalanche; Colorado Eagles (AHL)
- NHL draft: 217th overall, 2024; Colorado Avalanche
- Playing career: 2024–present

Nikita Olegovich Prishchepov (Russian: Никита Олегович Прищепов; born 20 February 2004) is a Russian professional ice hockey center for the Colorado Eagles of the American Hockey League (AHL) while under contract to the Colorado Avalanche of the National Hockey League (NHL).

A seventh round draft pick of the Avalanche in the 2024 NHL entry draft, Prishchepov made his debut the season after being drafted.

== Playing career ==
Growing up in Russia, Prishchepov played youth hockey in the country, most notably in the HC Vityaz system, before moving to Canada in 2021 to join the Victoriaville Tigres of the Quebec Major Junior Hockey League. In his debut season in North America, Prishchepov recorded 27 points in 65 games but was not selected in the 2022 NHL entry draft, his first draft of eligibility. He would play two more seasons in Victoriaville, recording 41 points and 67 points in each of his successive campaigns with the club. Following his third season with the Tigres, Prishchepov was named a finalist of the Guy Carbonneau Trophy, which is awarded to the league's best defensive forward, after averaging 54.2% in faceoffs throughout the season and being a mainstay on the team's penalty kill, though he did not end up winning the award.

Having gone undrafted in his first two years of eligibility, Prishchepov entered the 2024 NHL entry draft having been considered to be a late selection, being ranked the 188th North American skater by the NHL Central Scouting Bureau. Ultimately, he was selected in the seventh round, 217th overall by the Colorado Avalanche with the team's final pick in the draft. Following the Draft, Prishchepov was invited to Colorado's pre-season training camp before being cut from the team on 29 September. As an 'overaged' player, Prishchepov was eligible to play in the American Hockey League (AHL) despite being drafted out of the Canadian Hockey League, and was subsequently assigned to the Colorado Eagles' training camp, the AHL-level affiliate of the Avalanche. One week later, he was signed to a standard three-year, entry-level contract by the Avalanche on 6 October.

Starting his first professional season with the Eagles, Prishchepov appeared in six games with the club, recording one goal and three assists before being called up to the severely injury-depleted Avalanche on 2 November. The Avalanche began the season with injuries to several core members of the team, and Prishchepov was called up after Matt Stienburg, a fellow rookie who had been called up by the club earlier in the season due to the many injuries the team was facing, was given a two-game suspension by the NHL for a charging incident. He made his debut the following night, recording 13:30 of ice time in a 5–2 defeat to the Nashville Predators. In doing so, he became the third player from the 2024 NHL draft to debut in the league, following first-round draft picks Macklin Celebrini and Jett Luchanko. He was also the first seventh-round pick from the 2021-2024 drafts to play in the NHL. Prishchepov's debut gained traction as an atypical story given the unconventional nature of a seventh-round draft pick appearing in an NHL game the season following their draft year; Prishchepov was only the second player since the 2004–05 NHL lockout to debut the season following being drafted in the final round of the draft, after Dylan Ferguson, another player who was forced to appear with their NHL club following a slew of injuries to mainstay players. His play was considered strong by pundits in his opening match, and he recorded two shots on goal.

== Personal life ==
Prishchepov was born and raised in Russia. He did not speak English when he initially arrived in North America in 2021, but has taken English lessons each year since arriving and by 2024 was considered to be near-fluent. He has a sister and a brother who live in Russia. Due to his career and ongoing hostilities between Russia and the Western World, Prichepov has not seen his family since 2021, but video calls them 4–5 times a week.

== Career statistics ==
			Regular season					Playoffs
Season	Team	League	GP	G	A	Pts	PIM	GP	G	A	Pts	PIM
2020–21	Russkie Vityazi	MHL	37	2	9	11	18	—	—	—	—	—
2021–22	Victoriaville Tigres	QMJHL	65	9	18	27	56	—	—	—	—	—
2022–23	Victoriaville Tigres	QMJHL	63	14	27	41	63	5	2	2	4	6
2023–24	Victoriaville Tigres	QMJHL	63	22	45	67	70	14	3	8	11	20
2024–25	Colorado Eagles	AHL	51	9	14	23	38	3	0	0	0	2
2024–25	Colorado Avalanche	NHL	10	0	0	0	0	—	—	—	—	—
2025–26	Colorado Eagles	AHL	22	3	9	12	28	—	—	—	—	—
NHL totals			10	0	0	0	0	—	—	—	—	—
