= 2023–24 QMJHL season =

- League: Quebec Maritimes Junior Hockey League
- Sport: Hockey
- Duration: Regular season September 22, 2023 – March 23, 2024; Playoffs; March 29, 2024 – May 14, 2024
- Teams: 18
- TV partner(s): Eastlink TV; TVA Sports; MATV

Draft
- Top draft pick: Caleb Desnoyers
- Picked by: Moncton Wildcats

Regular season
- Jean Rougeau Trophy: Baie-Comeau Drakkar (3)
- Season MVP: Mathieu Cataford (Halifax Mooseheads)
- Top scorer: Antonin Verreault (Rouyn-Noranda Huskies)

Playoffs
- Playoffs MVP: Vsevolod Komarov (Voltigeurs)
- Finals champions: Drummondville Voltigeurs
- Runners-up: Baie-Comeau Drakkar

QMJHL seasons
- 2022–23 2024–25

2023–24 CHL season
- League: Canadian Hockey League
- Sport: Hockey
- Duration: OHL; September 2023 – May 2024; QMJHL; September 2023 – May 2024; WHL; September 2023 – May 2024
- Teams: 60
- TV partner(s): RDS; TSN; Rogers TV
- Season MVP: Jagger Firkus (Moose Jaw Warriors) (WHL)
- Top scorer: Jagger Firkus (Moose Jaw Warriors) (WHL)

Memorial Cup
- Champions: Saginaw Spirit (OHL) (1st title)
- Runners-up: London Knights (OHL)

The 2023–24 QMJHL season was the 55th season of the Quebec Maritimes Junior Hockey League. The league played a 68-game regular season which began on September 22, 2023, and ended on March 23, 2024.

The playoffs began on March 29, 2024 and ended on May 14, 2024. The Drummondville Voltigeurs won their second Gilles-Courteau Trophy, sweeping the Baie-Comeau Drakkar in the finals, and played in the 2024 Memorial Cup which was hosted by the Saginaw Spirit of the Ontario Hockey League at Dow Event Center in Saginaw, Michigan.

== Regular season standings ==
As of March 23, 2024

Note: GP = Games played; W = Wins; L = Losses; OTL = Overtime losses; SL = Shootout losses; GF = Goals for; GA = Goals against; PTS = Points; x = clinched playoff berth; y = clinched division title; z = clinched Jean Rougeau Trophy

=== Eastern Conference ===
Maritimes Division	GP	W	L	OTL	SL	PTS	GF	GA	Rank
xy-Halifax Mooseheads	68	42	18	7	1	92	227	184	2
x-Moncton Wildcats	68	38	23	4	3	83	274	231	3
x-Cape Breton Eagles	68	39	26	1	2	81	216	194	4
x-Acadie–Bathurst Titan	68	30	31	3	4	67	227	243	7
x-Charlottetown Islanders	68	26	34	6	2	60	208	267	8
x-Saint John Sea Dogs	68	20	39	5	4	49	185	293	9

East Division	GP	W	L	OTL	SL	PTS	GF	GA	Rank
xyz-Baie-Comeau Drakkar	68	53	12	2	1	109	290	163	1
x-Rimouski Océanic	68	37	26	5	0	79	250	236	5
x-Chicoutimi Saguenéens	68	35	25	4	4	78	247	229	6
Quebec Remparts	68	21	41	5	1	48	165	265	10

=== Western Conference ===
West Division	GP	W	L	OTL	SL	PTS	GF	GA	Rank
xy-Rouyn-Noranda Huskies	68	47	15	1	5	100	301	192	2
x-Blainville-Boisbriand Armada	68	31	31	4	2	68	214	230	5
x-Gatineau Olympiques	68	25	31	6	6	62	213	268	7
Val-d'Or Foreurs	68	15	48	3	2	35	173	319	8

Central Division	GP	W	L	OTL	SL	PTS	GF	GA	Rank
xy-Drummondville Voltigeurs	68	48	14	5	1	102	306	183	1
x-Victoriaville Tigres	68	43	20	4	1	91	263	218	3
x-Sherbrooke Phoenix	68	32	30	1	5	70	215	239	4
x-Shawinigan Cataractes	68	30	34	3	1	64	195	215	6

== Scoring leaders ==
Note: GP = Games played; G = Goals; A = Assists; Pts = Points; PIM = Penalty minutes
Source: CHL.ca

Player	Team	GP	G	A	Pts	PIM
Antonin Verreault	Rouyn-Noranda Huskies	68	36	71	107	48
Justin Gill	Baie-Comeau Drakkar	65	40	58	98	66
Mathieu Cataford	Halifax Mooseheads	65	40	50	90	33
Markus Vidicek	Halifax Mooseheads	64	45	43	88	27
Israël Mianscum	Sherbrooke Phoenix	61	35	52	87	55
Alexandre Blais	Rimouski Océanic	68	24	60	84	40
Justin Poirier	Baie-Comeau Drakkar	68	51	31	82	68
Robert Orr	Acadie–Bathurst Titan	64	24	58	82	37
Justin Larose	Victoriaville Tigres	67	38	42	80	26
Jérémie Minville	Gatineau Olympiques	68	38	41	79	57

== Leading goaltenders ==
Note: GP = Games played; Mins = Minutes played; W = Wins; L = Losses: OTL = Overtime losses; SL = Shootout losses; GA = Goals Allowed; SO = Shutouts; GAA = Goals against average
Source: CHL.ca

Player	Team	GP	Mins	W	L	OTL	SOL	GA	SO	Sv%	GAA
William Rousseau	Rouyn-Noranda Huskies	50	2,942:12	34	10	1	4	110	8	.924	2.24
Mathis Rousseau	Halifax Mooseheads	44	2,615:29	31	8	4	0	99	5	.925	2.27
Samuel St-Hilaire	Sherbrooke Phoenix	36	2,090:32	18	12	1	3	84	5	.915	2.41
Charles-Édward Gravel	Blainville-Boisbriand/Baie-Comeau	51	2,997:14	31	17	1	1	124	2	.909	2.48
Nicolas Ruccia	Cape Breton Eagles	40	2,322:35	21	15	0	2	100	6	.910	2.58

== 2024 Gilles-Courteau Trophy playoffs ==
In the first two rounds seeding is determined by conference standings, and in the two final rounds seeding is determined by overall standings.

Conference quarter-finals
W1	Drummondville	4
W8	Saint John	0
W2	Rouyn-Noranda	4
W7	Gatineau	1
W3	Victoriaville	4
W6	Shawinigan	0
W4	Sherbrooke	4
W5	Blainville-Boisbriand	3
E1	Baie-Comeau	4
E8	Charlottetown	0
E2	Halifax	0
E7	Acadie–Bathurst	4
E3	Moncton	0
E6	Chicoutimi	4
E4	Cape Breton	4
E5	Rimouski	1

Conference semi-finals
W1	Drummondville	4
W4	Sherbrooke	2
W2	Rouyn-Noranda	1
W3	Victoriaville	4
E1	Baie-Comeau	4
E7	Acadie–Bathurst	0
E4	Cape Breton	4
E6	Chicoutimi	0

Semi-finals
2	Drummondville	4
5	Victoriaville	1
1	Baie-Comeau	4
7	Cape Breton	1

Gilles-Courteau Trophy Championship
1	Baie-Comeau	0
2	Drummondville	4

== Conference quarterfinals ==
=== Western Conference quarterfinals ===
==== (1) Drummondville Voltigeurs vs. (8) Saint John Sea Dogs ====
March 29	Saint John Sea Dogs	3–7	Drummondville Voltigeurs	Centre Marcel Dionne	Recap
Nicolas Bilodeau (1) - pp - 18:48		First period	10:45 - Luke Woodworth (1); 19:04 - Mikael Huchette (1); 19:25 - Justin Côté (1)
Drew Elliott (1) - 1:44		Second period	5:07 - pp - Ethan Gauthier (1)
Pavel Šimek (1) - 5:07		Third period	4:33 - Justin Côté (2); 12:36 - Sam Oliver (1); 17:03 - en - Sam Oliver (2)
Patrick Leaver (33 saves / 39 shots)		Goalie stats	Riley Mercer (24 saves / 27 shots)

March 30	Saint John Sea Dogs	2–6	Drummondville Voltigeurs	Centre Marcel Dionne	Recap
Tyler Peddle (1) - 9:01		First period	3:43 - Peter Repcik (1)
Brody Fournier (1) - 1:56		Second period	6:02 - Noah Reinhart (1); 18:23 - pp - Ethan Gauthier (2)
No scoring		Third period	7:06 - Renaud Poulin (1); 12:51 - Mikaël Diotte (1); 16:55 - sh - en - Vsevolod Komarov (1)
Patrick Leaver (35 saves / 40 shots)		Goalie stats	Riley Mercer (20 saves / 22 shots)

April 2	Drummondville Voltigeurs	4–2	Saint John Sea Dogs	TD Station	Recap
Justin Côté (3) - 11:06; Maxime Lafond (1) - 16:29		First period	No scoring
Peter Repcik (2) - 1:32; Justin Côté (4) - 8:31		Second period	13:33 - Drew Elliott (2)
No scoring		Third period	0:19 - Pavel Šimek (2)
Riley Mercer (19 saves / 21 shots)		Goalie stats	Patrick Leaver (45 saves / 49 shots)

April 3	Drummondville Voltigeurs	8–1	Saint John Sea Dogs	TD Station	Recap
No scoring		First period	No scoring
Peter Repcik (3) - 1:34; Noah Reinhart (2) - 1:41; Ethan Gauthier (3) - pp - 8:47; Ethan Gauthier (4) - 13:51		Second period	5:52 - pp - Matteo Mann (1)
Maxime Lafond (2) - 6:49; Simon-Pier Brunet (1) - en - 12:57; William Dumont (1) - pp - 14:47; Renaud Poulin (2) - 15:49		Third period	No scoring
Riley Mercer (30 saves / 31 shots)		Goalie stats	Patrick Leaver (47 saves / 54 shots)

Drummondville wins series 4–0

==== (2) Rouyn-Noranda Huskies vs. (7) Gatineau Olympiques ====
March 29	Gatineau Olympiques	0–4	Rouyn-Noranda Huskies	Aréna Glencore	Recap

March 30	Gatineau Olympiques	1–2	Rouyn-Noranda Huskies	Aréna Glencore	Recap

April 2	Rouyn-Noranda Huskies	2–5	Gatineau Olympiques	Centre Slush Puppie	Recap

April 3	Rouyn-Noranda Huskies	6–1	Gatineau Olympiques	Centre Slush Puppie	Recap

April 5	Gatineau Olympiques	3–8	Rouyn-Noranda Huskies	Aréna Glencore	Recap

Rouyn-Noranda wins series 4–1

==== (3) Victoriaville Tigres vs. (6) Shawinigan Cataractes ====
March 29	Shawinigan Cataractes	3–4	OT	Victoriaville Tigres	Colisée Desjardins	Recap

March 30	Shawinigan Cataractes	1–5	Victoriaville Tigres	Colisée Desjardins	Recap

April 2	Victoriaville Tigres	3–0	Shawinigan Cataractes	Centre Gervais Auto	Recap

April 3	Victoriaville Tigres	5–1	Shawinigan Cataractes	Centre Gervais Auto	Recap

Victoriaville wins series 4–0

==== (4) Sherbrooke Phoenix vs. (5) Blainville-Boisbriand Armada ====
March 29	Blainville-Boisbriand Armada	3–4	OT	Sherbrooke Phoenix	Palais des Sports Léopold-Drolet	Recap

March 30	Blainville-Boisbriand Armada	2–3	OT	Sherbrooke Phoenix	Palais des Sports Léopold-Drolet	Recap

April 2	Sherbrooke Phoenix	3–4	Blainville-Boisbriand Armada	Centre d'Excellence Sports Rousseau	Recap

April 3	Sherbrooke Phoenix	2–1	Blainville-Boisbriand Armada	Centre d'Excellence Sports Rousseau	Recap

April 5	Blainville-Boisbriand Armada	5–4	Sherbrooke Phoenix	Palais des Sports Léopold-Drolet	Recap

April 7	Sherbrooke Phoenix	2–3	Blainville-Boisbriand Armada	Centre d'Excellence Sports Rousseau	Recap

April 9	Blainville-Boisbriand Armada	1–3	Sherbrooke Phoenix	Palais des Sports Léopold-Drolet	Recap

Sherbrooke wins series 4–3

=== Eastern Conference quarterfinals ===
==== (1) Baie-Comeau Drakkar vs. (8) Charlottetown Islanders ====
March 29	Charlottetown Islanders	1–4	Baie-Comeau Drakkar	Centre Henry-Leonard	Recap
No scoring		First period	5:11 - Jules Boilard (1)
Alexis Michaud (1) - 18:03		Second period	6:24 - Isaac Dufort (1); 8:49 - Justin Poirier (1); 18:52 - pp - Justin Gill (1)
No scoring		Third period	No scoring
Carter Bickle (40 saves / 44 shots)		Goalie stats	Charles-Édward Gravel (14 saves / 15 shots)

March 30	Charlottetown Islanders	1–4	Baie-Comeau Drakkar	Centre Henry-Leonard	Recap
No scoring		First period	1:06 - Matyáš Melovský (1); 4:32 - pp - Félix Gagnon (1)
Simon Hughes (1) - pp - 4:21		Second period	14:19 - pp - Justin Poirier (2)
No scoring		Third period	10:04 - Matyáš Melovský (2)
Carter Bickle (32 saves / 36 shots)		Goalie stats	Charles-Édward Gravel (21 saves / 22 shots)

April 2	Baie-Comeau Drakkar	5–3	Charlottetown Islanders	Eastlink Centre	Recap
Anthony Lavoie (1) - 0:23		First period	14:49 - pp - Simon Hughes (2)
Matyáš Melovský (3) - sh - 7:55; Niks Feņenko (1) - 7:55; Alexis Bernier (1) - 8:45; Raoul Boilard (1) - 19:42		Second period	No scoring
No scoring		Third period	1:25 - Alexis Michaud (2); 10:05 - pp - William Shields (1)
Charles-Édward Gravel (23 saves / 26 shots)		Goalie stats	Carter Bickle (36 saves / 41 shots)

April 3	Baie-Comeau Drakkar	7–1	Charlottetown Islanders	Eastlink Centre	Recap
Justin Poirier (3) - pp - 18:46		First period	No scoring
Matyáš Melovský (4) - pp - 2:33; Justin Gill (2) - 8:49; Justin Poirier (4) - 9:14; Justin Gill (3) - 18:52		Second period	5:25 - Cole Huckins (1)
Isaac Dufort (2) - pp - 5:09; Isaac Dufort (3) - 17:46		Third period	No scoring
Charles-Édward Gravel (20 saves / 21 shots)		Goalie stats	Carter Bickle (48 saves / 55 shots)

Baie-Comeau wins series 4–0

==== (2) Halifax Mooseheads vs. (7) Acadie–Bathurst Titan ====
March 29	Acadie–Bathurst Titan	2–1	OT	Halifax Mooseheads	Scotiabank Centre	Recap
Dylan Andrews (1) - 8:40		First period		No scoring
No scoring		Second period		19:02 - Braeden MacPhee (1)
No scoring		Third period		No scoring
Milo Roelens (1) - 2:57		First overtime period		No scoring
Antoine Keller (26 saves / 27 shots)		Goalie stats		Mathis Rousseau (33 saves / 35 shots)

March 30	Acadie–Bathurst Titan	2–1	OT	Halifax Mooseheads	Scotiabank Centre	Recap

April 2	Halifax Mooseheads	2–7	Acadie–Bathurst Titan	K.C. Irving Regional Centre	Recap

April 3	Halifax Mooseheads	2–3	Acadie–Bathurst Titan	K.C. Irving Regional Centre	Recap

Acadie–Bathurst wins series 4–0

==== (3) Moncton Wildcats vs. (6) Chicoutimi Saguenéens ====
March 29	Chicoutimi Saguenéens	3–0	Moncton Wildcats	Avenir Centre	Recap

March 30	Chicoutimi Saguenéens	5–4	Moncton Wildcats	Avenir Centre	Recap

April 2	Moncton Wildcats	2–4	Chicoutimi Saguenéens	Centre Georges-Vézina	Recap

April 3	Moncton Wildcats	2–5	Chicoutimi Saguenéens	Centre Georges-Vézina	Recap

Chicoutimi wins series 4–0

==== (4) Cape Breton Eagles vs. (5) Rimouski Océanic ====
March 29	Rimouski Océanic	2–6	Cape Breton Eagles	Centre 200	Recap

March 30	Rimouski Océanic	3–7	Cape Breton Eagles	Centre 200	Recap

April 2	Cape Breton Eagles	3–1	Rimouski Océanic	Colisée Financière Sun Life	Recap

April 3	Cape Breton Eagles	3–4	Rimouski Océanic	Colisée Financière Sun Life	Recap

April 5	Cape Breton Eagles	4–2	Rimouski Océanic	Colisée Financière Sun Life	Recap

Cape Breton wins series 4–1

== Conference semifinals ==
=== Western Conference semifinals ===
==== (1) Drummondville Voltigeurs vs. (4) Sherbrooke Phoenix ====
April 12	Sherbrooke Phoenix	2–5	Drummondville Voltigeurs	Centre Marcel-Dionne	Recap

April 13	Sherbrooke Phoenix	2–5	Drummondville Voltigeurs	Centre Marcel-Dionne	Recap

April 16	Drummondville Voltigeurs	7–1	Sherbrooke Phoenix	Palais des Sports Léopold-Drolet	Recap

April 17	Drummondville Voltigeurs	1–5	Sherbrooke Phoenix	Palais des Sports Léopold-Drolet	Recap

April 19	Sherbrooke Phoenix	4–3	Drummondville Voltigeurs	Centre Marcel-Dionne	Recap

April 21	Drummondville Voltigeurs	6–1	Sherbrooke Phoenix	Palais des Sports Léopold-Drolet	Recap

Drummondville wins series 4–2

==== (2) Rouyn-Noranda Huskies vs. (3) Victoriaville Tigres ====
April 12	Victoriaville Tigres	6–3	Rouyn-Noranda Huskies	Aréna Glencore	Recap

April 13	Victoriaville Tigres	7–6	Rouyn-Noranda Huskies	Aréna Glencore	Recap

April 16	Rouyn-Noranda Huskies	4–1	Victoriaville Tigres	Colisée Desjardins	Recap

April 17	Rouyn-Noranda Huskies	4–5	Victoriaville Tigres	Colisée Desjardins	Recap

April 19	Rouyn-Noranda Huskies	3–5	Victoriaville Tigres	Colisée Desjardins	Recap

Victoriaville wins series 4–1

=== Eastern Conference semifinals ===
==== (1) Baie-Comeau Drakkar vs. (7) Acadie–Bathurst Titan ====
April 12	Acadie–Bathurst Titan	1–2	Baie-Comeau Drakkar	Centre Henry-Leonard	Recap

April 13	Acadie–Bathurst Titan	2–4	Baie-Comeau Drakkar	Centre Henry-Leonard	Recap

April 16	Baie-Comeau Drakkar	6–5	OT	Acadie–Bathurst Titan	K.C. Irving Regional Centre	Recap

April 17	Baie-Comeau Drakkar	5–4	OT	Acadie–Bathurst Titan	K.C. Irving Regional Centre	Recap

Baie-Comeau wins series 4–0

==== (4) Cape Breton Eagles vs. (6) Chicoutimi Saguenéens ====
April 12	Chicoutimi Saguenéens	0–4	Cape Breton Eagles	Centre 200	Recap

April 13	Chicoutimi Saguenéens	0–1	Cape Breton Eagles	Centre 200	Recap

April 16	Cape Breton Eagles	6–2	Chicoutimi Saguenéens	Centre Georges-Vézina	Recap

April 17	Cape Breton Eagles	8–5	Chicoutimi Saguenéens	Centre Georges-Vézina	Recap

Cape Breton wins series 4–0

== Semifinals ==
=== (2) Drummondville Voltigeurs vs. (5) Victoriaville Tigres ===
April 26	Victoriaville Tigres	1–2	Drummondville Voltigeurs	Centre Marcel-Dionne	Recap

April 27	Victoriaville Tigres	1–5	Drummondville Voltigeurs	Centre Marcel-Dionne	Recap

April 30	Drummondville Voltigeurs	3–2	Victoriaville Tigres	Colisée Desjardins	Recap

May 1	Drummondville Voltigeurs	2–3	OT	Victoriaville Tigres	Colisée Desjardins	Recap

May 3	Victoriaville Tigres	2–3	OT	Drummondville Voltigeurs	Centre Marcel-Dionne	Recap

Drummondville wins series 4–1

=== (1) Baie-Comeau Drakkar vs. (7) Cape Breton Eagles ===
April 25	Cape Breton Eagles	0–4	Baie-Comeau Drakkar	Centre Henry-Leonard	Recap

April 26	Cape Breton Eagles	3–5	Baie-Comeau Drakkar	Centre Henry-Leonard	Recap

April 29	Baie-Comeau Drakkar	1–2	Cape Breton Eagles	Centre 200	Recap

April 30	Baie-Comeau Drakkar	8–2	Cape Breton Eagles	Centre 200	Recap

May 2	Cape Breton Eagles	1–2	OT	Baie-Comeau Drakkar	Centre Henry-Leonard	Recap

Baie-Comeau wins series 4–1

== Gilles-Courteau Trophy championship ==
=== (1) Baie-Comeau Drakkar vs. (2) Drummondville Voltigeurs ===
May 9	Drummondville Voltigeurs	5–0	Baie-Comeau Drakkar	Centre Henry-Leonard	Recap
Alexis Gendron (9) – pp – 1:56; Luke Woodworth (7) – 12:51		First period	No scoring
Justin Côté (8) – 4:28; Alexis Gendron (10) – 18:02		Second period	No scoring
Alexis Gendron (11) – 2:02		Third period	No scoring
Riley Mercer (43 saves / 43 shots)		Goalie stats	Charles-Édward Gravel (25 saves / 30 shots)

May 10	Drummondville Voltigeurs	1–0	OT	Baie-Comeau Drakkar	Centre Henry-Leonard	Recap
No scoring		First period		No scoring
No scoring		Second period		No scoring
No scoring		Third period		No scoring
Ethan Gauthier (11) – 5:23		First overtime period		No scoring
Riley Mercer (33 saves / 33 shots)		Goalie stats		Charles-Édward Gravel (38 saves / 39 shots)

May 13	Baie-Comeau Drakkar	2–6	Drummondville Voltigeurs	Centre Marcel-Dionne	Recap
No scoring		First period	3:34 – Vsevolod Komarov (5); 11:55 – Sam Oliver (7); 13:27 – Ethan Gauthier (12); 16:42 – Lukas Landry (2)
Justin Poirier (18) – pp – 16:41		Second period	7:58 – Justin Côté (9); 17:56 – Ethan Gauthier (13)
Isaac Dufort (7) – 10:26		Third period	No scoring
Charles-Édward Gravel (24 saves / 30 shots)		Goalie stats	Riley Mercer (17 saves / 19 shots)

May 14	Baie-Comeau Drakkar	3–4	Drummondville Voltigeurs	Centre Marcel-Dionne	Recap
No scoring		First period	5:28 – pp – Ethan Gauthier (14)
Niks Fenenko (5) – 16:25		Second period	9:30 – Sam Oliver (8)
Justin Gill (11) – 18:37; Matyas Melovsky (5) – 19:38		Third period	1:36 – Matteo Rotondi (1); 8:20 – pp – Sam Oliver (9)
Charles-Édward Gravel (26 saves / 30 shots)		Goalie stats	Riley Mercer (23 saves / 26 shots)

Drummondville wins series 4–0

== Playoff leading scorers ==
Note: GP = Games played; G = Goals; A = Assists; Pts = Points; PIM = Penalties minutes

Player	Team	GP	G	A	Pts	PIM
Justin Poirier	Baie-Comeau Drakkar	17	18	9	27	12
Ethan Gauthier	Drummondville Voltigeurs	19	14	11	25	4
Justin Gill	Baie-Comeau Drakkar	17	11	14	25	18
Luke Woodworth	Drummondville Voltigeurs	19	7	17	24	14
Maxime Pellerin	Victoriaville Tigres	14	13	8	21	20
Cam Squires	Cape Breton Eagles	14	9	11	20	15
Mikael Huchette	Drummondville Voltigeurs	19	4	16	20	12
Alexis Gendron	Drummondville Voltigeurs	15	11	8	19	16
Matyas Melovsky	Baie-Comeau Drakkar	17	5	14	19	8
Niks Fenenko	Baie-Comeau Drakkar	17	5	13	18	4

== Playoff leading goaltenders ==
Note: GP = Games played; Mins = Minutes played; W = Wins; L = Losses: OTL = Overtime losses; SL = Shootout losses; GA = Goals Allowed; SO = Shutouts; GAA = Goals against average

Player	Team	GP	Mins	W	L	GA	SO	Sv%	GAA
Riley Mercer	Drummondville Voltigeurs	19	1144:57	16	3	36	2	.934	1.89
Antoine Keller	Acadie–Bathurst Titan	7	433:56	4	3	17	0	.925	2.35
Charles-Édward Gravel	Baie-Comeau Drakkar	17	1036:34	12	5	41	1	.910	2.37
Mathys Fernandez	Shawinigan Cataractes	2	111:52	0	2	5	0	.909	2.68
Nicolas Ruccia	Cape Breton Eagles	14	811:59	9	5	37	2	.911	2.73

== Trophies and awards ==
2023–24 QMJHL Awards
Award	Recipient(s)	Runner(s)-up/Finalists	Source
Gilles-Courteau Trophy; Playoff champions	Drummondville Voltigeurs	Baie-Comeau Drakkar	
Jean Rougeau Trophy; Regular season champions	Baie-Comeau Drakkar	Drummondville Voltigeurs	
Luc Robitaille Trophy; Team with the best goals for average	Drummondville Voltigeurs	Rouyn-Noranda Huskies	
Robert Lebel Trophy; Team with the best goals against average	Baie-Comeau Drakkar	Halifax Mooseheads; Rouyn-Noranda Huskies	
Michel Brière Memorial Trophy; Regular season MVP	Mathieu Cataford, Halifax Mooseheads	Justin Gill, Baie-Comeau Drakkar; Antonin Verreault, Rouyn-Noranda Huskies	
Jean Béliveau Trophy; Top Scorer	Antonin Verreault, Rouyn-Noranda Huskies	Justin Gill, Baie-Comeau Drakkar	
Mario Lemieux Trophy; Top goal scorer	Justin Poirier, Baie-Comeau Drakkar	Markus Vidicek, Halifax Mooseheads	
Guy Lafleur Trophy; Playoff MVP	Vsevolod Komarov, Drummondville Voltigeurs		
Patrick Roy Trophy; Goaltender of the Year	William Rousseau, Rouyn-Noranda Huskies	Mathis Rousseau, Halifax Mooseheads; Samuel St-Hilaire, Sherbrooke Phoenix	
Jacques Plante Memorial Trophy; Goaltender with best goals against average	William Rousseau, Rouyn-Noranda Huskies	Mathis Rousseau, Halifax Mooseheads	
Guy Carbonneau Trophy; Best Defensive Forward	Félix Gagnon, Baie-Comeau Drakkar	Nikita Prishchepov, Victoriaville Tigres; Anthony Turcotte, Rouyn-Noranda Huskies	
Emile Bouchard Trophy; Defenceman of the Year	Vsevolod Komarov, Drummondville Voltigeurs	Maveric Lamoureux, Drummondville Voltigeurs; Pier-Olivier Roy, Victoriaville Tigres	
Kevin Lowe Trophy; Best Defensive Defenceman	Mikaël Diotte, Drummondville Voltigeurs	Alex Carr, Rouyn-Noranda Huskies; Pier-Olivier Roy, Victoriaville Tigres	
Michael Bossy Trophy; Top Prospect	Maxim Massé, Chicoutimi Saguenéens	Raoul Boilard, Baie-Comeau Drakkar; Spencer Gill, Rimouski Océanic	
RDS Cup; Rookie of the Year	Émile Guité, Chicoutimi Saguenéens	Xavier Villeneuve, Blainville-Boisbriand Armada	
Michel Bergeron Trophy; Offensive Rookie of the Year	Émile Guité, Chicoutimi Saguenéens	Raoul Boilard, Baie-Comeau Drakkar; Caleb Desnoyers, Moncton Wildcats	
Raymond Lagacé Trophy; Defensive Rookie of the Year	Xavier Villeneuve, Blainville-Boisbriand Armada	Alex Huang, Chicoutimi Saguenéens; Jakub Milota, Cape Breton Eagles	
Frank J. Selke Memorial Trophy; Most Sportsmanlike Player	Preston Lounsbury, Moncton Wildcats	Justin Larose, Victoriaville Tigres; Julien Paillé, Baie-Comeau Drakkar	
QMJHL Humanitarian of the Year; Humanitarian of the Year	Marcus Kearsey, Charlottetown Islanders	Jacob Mathieu, Rimouski Océanic; Anthony Lavoie, Baie-Comeau Drakkar	
Marcel Robert Trophy; Best Scholastic Player	Alexis Morin, Chicoutimi Saguenéens	Alexis Bonefon, Shawinigan Cataractes; Mathieu Cataford, Halifax Mooseheads	
Paul Dumont Trophy; Personality of the Year	Émile Chouinard, Baie-Comeau Drakkar; Jacob Newcombe, Cape Breton Eagles	Yanick Jean, Chicoutimi Saguenéens; Justin Poirier, Baie-Comeau Drakkar	
Ron Lapointe Trophy; Coach of the Year	Jean-François Grégoire, Baie-Comeau Drakkar	Gilles Bouchard, Sherbrooke Phoenix; Sylvain Favreau, Drummondville Voltigeurs	
Maurice Filion Trophy; General Manager of the Year	Jean-François Grégoire, Baie-Comeau Drakkar	Yanick Jean, Chicoutimi Saguenéens; Yanick Lemay, Drummondville Voltigeurs	

=== All-Star teams ===
First All-Star Team:

- William Rousseau, Goaltender, Rouyn-Noranda Huskies
- Vsevolod Komarov, Defenceman, Drummondville Voltigeurs
- Pier-Olivier Roy, Defenceman, Victoriaville Tigres
- Mathieu Cataford, Halifax Mooseheads
- Justin Gill, Forward, Baie-Comeau Drakkar
- Antonin Verreault, Forward, Halifax Mooseheads

Second All-Star Team

- Mathis Rousseau, Goaltender, Halifax Mooseheads
- Maveric Lamoureux, Defenceman, Drummondville Voltigeurs
- Jérémy Langlois, Defenceman, Rouyn-Noranda Huskies
- Israël Mianscum, Forward, Sherbrooke Phoenix
- Justin Poirier, Forward, Baie-Comeau Drakkar
- Markus Vidicek, Forward, Halifax Mooseheads

== See also ==
- List of QMJHL seasons
- 2023–24 OHL season
- 2023–24 WHL season

Preceded by 2022–23 QMJHL season	QMJHL seasons	Succeeded by 2024–25 QMJHL season
