= Moncton Wildcats =

Junior ice hockey team in Moncton, New Brunswick

Moncton Wildcats Wildcats de Moncton
- City: Moncton, New Brunswick
- League: Quebec Maritimes Junior Hockey League
- Conference: Eastern
- Division: Maritimes
- Founded: 1995
- Home arena: Avenir Centre
- Colours: Red, white, blue and gold
- General manager: Taylor MacDougall
- Head coach: Gardiner MacDougall
- Website: moncton-wildcats.com

Franchise history
- 1995–1996: Moncton Alpines
- 1996–present: Moncton Wildcats

Championships
- Playoff championships: QMJHL Champions; 2006, 2010, 2025

Current uniform

The Moncton Wildcats are a Canadian junior ice hockey team in the Quebec Maritimes Junior Hockey League (QMJHL) based in Moncton, New Brunswick. The franchise was granted for the 1995–96 season known as the Moncton Alpines, then rebranded as the Wildcats in the next season. The team played at the Moncton Coliseum from 1995 until 2018, and moved into the Avenir Centre prior to the 2018–19 season. After winning the 2005–06 QMJHL championship, the team hosted the 2006 Memorial Cup and reached the final game. The Wildcats also won the league championship in 2009–10, and competed at the 2010 Memorial Cup in Brandon, Manitoba. The team won its third QMJHL championship in 2024–25, defeating the Rimouski Océanic in six games to claim the Gilles-Courteau Trophy, before participating in the 2025 Memorial Cup in Rimouski.

== History ==
The Moncton Alpines joined the Quebec Major Junior Hockey League for the 1995–96 season. They played for one season under the ownership of racing driver John Graham and were coached by Lucien DeBlois. The franchise was purchased by Robert Irving in May 1996, and renamed the Moncton Wildcats with new uniforms and logo.

Moncton hosted the 2006 Memorial Cup. The team hired former NHL coach of the year Ted Nolan, and acquired players such as Keith Yandle, and various rookies. The Wildcats finished in first place in the league, going 52–15–0–3 for 107 points and winning the Jean Rougeau Trophy for the first time. The Wildcats defeated the Quebec Remparts to the President's Cup. In the Memorial Cup, Moncton finished second in the round-robin after defeating Peterborough and Vancouver but losing to Quebec. The Wildcats defeated the Giants in the semi-final, but lost to the Remparts 6–2 in the Memorial Cup final.

In 2024–25, the Wildcats had their best regular season in franchise history, recording 53 wins and 108 points under head coach Gardiner MacDougall. In the playoffs, Moncton swept the Quebec Remparts, defeated the Baie-Comeau Drakkar in five games, and swept the Rouyn-Noranda Huskies before winning the championship series against the Rimouski Océanic in six games to claim the Gilles-Courteau Trophy, the franchise's third QMJHL championship, after wins in 2006 and 2010. Caleb Desnoyers won the Guy Lafleur Trophy as playoff MVP, totalling 30 points during the playoffs.

== Coaches ==
- 1995–1996 Lucien DeBlois: 14–48–8–0
- 1996–1997 Bill Riley: 16–52–2–0
- 1997–2000 Réal Paiement: 111–77–21–3
- 2000–2001 Tom Coolen (Fired in November 2001): 43–82–10–9
- 2001–2005 Christian La Rue (Fired in January 2005): 126–91–21–0
- 2005 Daniel Lacroix: 8–8–5
- 2005–2006 Ted Nolan: 52–15–0–3
- 2006–2007 John Torchetti: 39–25–4–2
- 2007–2013 Danny Flynn: 222–151–47
- 2013–2019 Darren Rumble (Fired in January 2019): 180–169–19–14
- 2019 John Torchetti (Fired in December 2019): 24–9–0
- 2019–2024 Daniel Lacroix: 138–103–15–9
- 2024–present Gardiner MacDougall

== Players ==
=== Retired numbers ===
- 29 Corey Crawford (Moncton Wildcats, 2001–2005)

=== NHL alumni ===
The following players have played in at least one National Hockey League (NHL) game as of the 2023–24 season:

- Dmitry Afanasenkov
- Evgeny Artyukhin
- Jean-Sébastien Aubin
- Ivan Barbashev
- Mark Barberio
- Oskars Bārtulis
- François Beauchemin
- Steve Bernier
- Luc Bourdon
- Gabriel Bourque
- Corey Crawford
- Pierre Dagenais
- Jean-François Damphousse
- Phillip Danault
- Jason Demers
- Nicolas Deschamps
- Louis Domingue
- Philippe Dupuis
- Jonathan Ferland
- Gabriel Fortier
- Conor Garland
- Jonathan Girard
- Brandon Gormley
- Benoit-Olivier Groulx
- Dmitrij Jaškin
- Ross Johnston
- Dmitri Kalinin
- Mārtiņš Karsums
- Simon Lajeunesse
- Andrew MacDonald
- Zack MacEwen
- Brad Marchand
- Johnny Oduya
- P.A. Parenteau
- Jakob Pelletier
- Adam Pineault
- Jean-François Racine
- Jérôme Samson
- David Savard
- Zack Sill
- Jordan Spence
- Alexei Tezikov
- Patrick Thoresen
- Vladimir Tkachev
- Josh Tordjman
- Keith Yandle

=== NHL first round draft picks ===
List of first round selections in the NHL entry draft:

Year	#	Player	Nationality	NHL team
1997	24	Jean-François Damphousse (G)	Canada	New Jersey Devils
2003	16	Steve Bernier (RW)	Canada	San Jose Sharks
2010	13	Brandon Gormley (D)	Canada	Phoenix Coyotes
2019	26	Jakob Pelletier (LW)	Canada	Calgary Flames
2025	4	Caleb Desnoyers (C)	Canada	Utah Mammoth

== Season-by-season results ==
- 1995–96 Moncton Alpines
- 1996–present Moncton Wildcats

=== Regular season ===
OTL = Overtime loss
SL = Shootout loss

Season	Games	Won	Lost	Tied	OTL	SL	Points	Pct %	Goals For	Goals Against	Standing
1995–96	70	14	48	8	–	–	36	0.257	215	360	7th in Dilio
1996–97	70	16	52	2	–	–	34	0.243	192	354	7th in Dilio
1997–98	70	39	32	9	–	–	67	0.479	240	229	4th in Dilio
1998–99	70	38	25	7	–	–	81	0.593	257	235	4th in Dilio
1999–2000	72	44	20	5	3	–	96	0.646	292	211	1st in Maritimes
2000–01	72	23	41	6	2	–	54	0.361	246	323	4th in Maritimes
2001–02	72	20	41	4	7	–	51	0.306	214	287	4th in Maritimes
2002–03	72	37	20	10	5	–	89	0.583	255	216	3rd in Maritimes
2003–04	70	46	19	3	2	–	97	0.679	270	206	2nd in Atlantic
2004–05	70	37	23	8	2	–	84	0.586	206	175	2nd in Atlantic
2005–06	70	52	15	–	0	3	107	0.776	345	184	1st in East
2006–07	70	39	25	–	4	2	84	0.557	254	263	3rd in East
2007–08	70	21	34	–	5	10	57	0.300	191	242	8th in East
2008–09	68	48	14	–	2	4	102	0.706	236	149	1st in East
2009–10	68	48	14	–	2	4	102	0.706	276	164	2nd in Atlantic
2010–11	68	33	25	–	3	7	76	0.485	232	256	3rd in Maritimes
2011–12	68	30	31	–	3	4	67	0.441	190	228	4th in Maritimes
2012–13	68	42	23	–	2	1	87	0.640	274	202	2nd in Telus Maritimes
2013–14	68	33	32	–	0	2	69	0.507	214	226	3rd in Telus Maritimes
2014–15	68	46	19	–	0	3	95	0.699	287	232	1st in Maritimes
2015–16	68	36	21	–	9	2	83	0.610	268	250	2nd in Maritimes
2016–17	68	14	51	–	2	1	31	0.228	170	356	6th in Maritimes
2017–18	68	27	33	–	5	3	62	0.456	233	282	5th in Maritimes
2018–19	68	38	21	–	4	5	85	0.625	274	222	4th in Maritimes
2019–20	64	50	13	–	1	0	101	0.789	276	148	1st in Maritimes
2020–21	31	11	17	–	2	1	25	0.403	105	136	5th in Maritimes
2021–22	68	28	31	–	6	3	65	0.478	208	273	5th in Maritimes
2022–23	68	35	29	–	2	2	74	0.544	255	249	2nd in Maritimes
2023–24	68	38	23	–	4	3	83	0.610	274	231	2nd in Maritimes
2024–25	64	53	9	–	2	0	108	0.844	294	144	1st in Maritimes
2025–26	64	50	10	–	2	2	104	0.813	302	164	1st in Eastern Conference

=== Playoffs ===
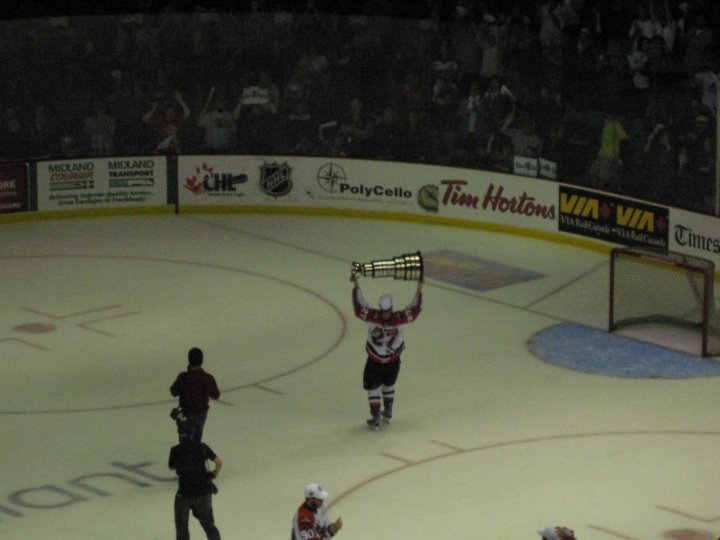
Saint John 4 @ Wildcats 7.

Season	1st round	2nd round	3rd round	Finals
1995–96	Did not qualify			
1996–97	Did not qualify			
1997–98	W, 4–2, Chicoutimi	3rd, round-robin, Quebec/Rimouski	–	–
1998–99	L, 0–4, Rimouski	–	–	–
1999–2000	W, 4–0, Acadie–Bathurst	W, 4–3, Quebec	L, 1–4, Rimouski	–
2000–01	Did not qualify			
2001–02	Did not qualify			
2002–03	L, 2–4, Quebec	–	–	–
2003–04	W, 4–0, Baie-Comeau	W, 4–2, P.E.I.	W, 4–1, Rimouski	L, 1–4, Hull
2004–05	W, 4–2, Drummondville	L, 2–4, Rouyn-Noranda	–	–
2005–06	W, 4–1, Victoriaville	W, 4–1, Halifax	W, 4–1, Gatineau	W, 4–2, Quebec
2006–07	L, 3–4, Halifax	–	–	–
2007–08	Did not qualify			
2008–09	W, 4–1, P.E.I.	L, 2–4, Rimouski	–	–
2009–10	W, 4–1, Cape Breton	W, 4–1, Rouyn-Noranda	W, 4–1, Drummondville	W, 4–2, Saint John
2010–11	L, 1–4, Lewiston	–	–	–
2011–12	L, 0–4, Halifax	–	–	–
2012–13	L, 1–4, Victoriaville	–	–	–
2013–14	L, 2–4, Blainville-Boisbriand	–	–	–
2014–15	W, 4–1, Chicoutimi	W, 4–3, Halifax	L, 0–4, Quebec	–
2015–16	W, 4–1, Victoriaville	W, 4–2, Gatineau	L, 2–4, Rouyn-Noranda	–
2016–17	Did not qualify			
2017–18	W, 4–3, Rimouski	L, 1–4, Blainville-Boisbriand	–	–
2018–19	W, 4–3, Baie-Comeau	L, 0–4, Halifax	–	–
2019–20	QMJHL playoffs cancelled due to ongoing COVID-19 pandemic			
2020–21	Lost round-robin tournament	–	–	–
2021–22	L, 0–3, Charlottetown	–	–	–
2022–23	W, 4–3, Baie-Comeau	L, 1–4, Halifax	–	–
2023–24	L, 0–4, Chicoutimi	–	–	–
2024–25	W, 4–0, Quebec	W, 4–1, Baie-Comeau	W, 4–0, Rouyn-Noranda	W, 4–2, Rimouski
2025–26	W, 4–0, Saint John	W, 4–0, Val-d'Or	W, 4–3, Blainville-Boisbriand	L, 2–4, Chicoutimi

=== Memorial Cup ===
The Memorial Cup is contested annually by the champions of the Ontario Hockey League (OHL), Quebec Maritimes Junior Hockey League (QMJHL), and Western Hockey League (WHL), as well as a predetermined host team. The competition consists of a round-robin, a semifinal game, and a final game. Below are the results of every game the Moncton Wildcats have competed in.

Year	Round-robin	Semifinal	Final
2006 (Note: Host team)	W, 3–2, Vancouver Giants; W, 4–2, Peterborough Petes; L, 3–4, Quebec Remparts	W, 3–1, Vancouver Giants	L, 2–6, Quebec Remparts
2010	L, 4–5, Calgary Hitmen; L, 0–4, Brandon Wheat Kings; L, 3–4, Windsor Spitfires	–	–
2025	L, 2–3, London Knights; L, 1–3, Medicine Hat Tigers; W, 6–2, Rimouski Océanic	L, 2–5, London Knights	–

== See also ==
- List of ice hockey teams in New Brunswick
