= Centre Marcel-Dionne =

Arena in Drummondville, Quebec

Coordinates: 45°53′01″N 72°29′35″W

The Centre Marcel Dionne is a 4,000 capacity (3,038 seated) multi-purpose arena in Drummondville, Quebec, Canada. It is home to the Drummondville Voltigeurs Ice hockey team. It is named in honour of Marcel Dionne. It was built in 1963 and was originally called the Centre Civique.

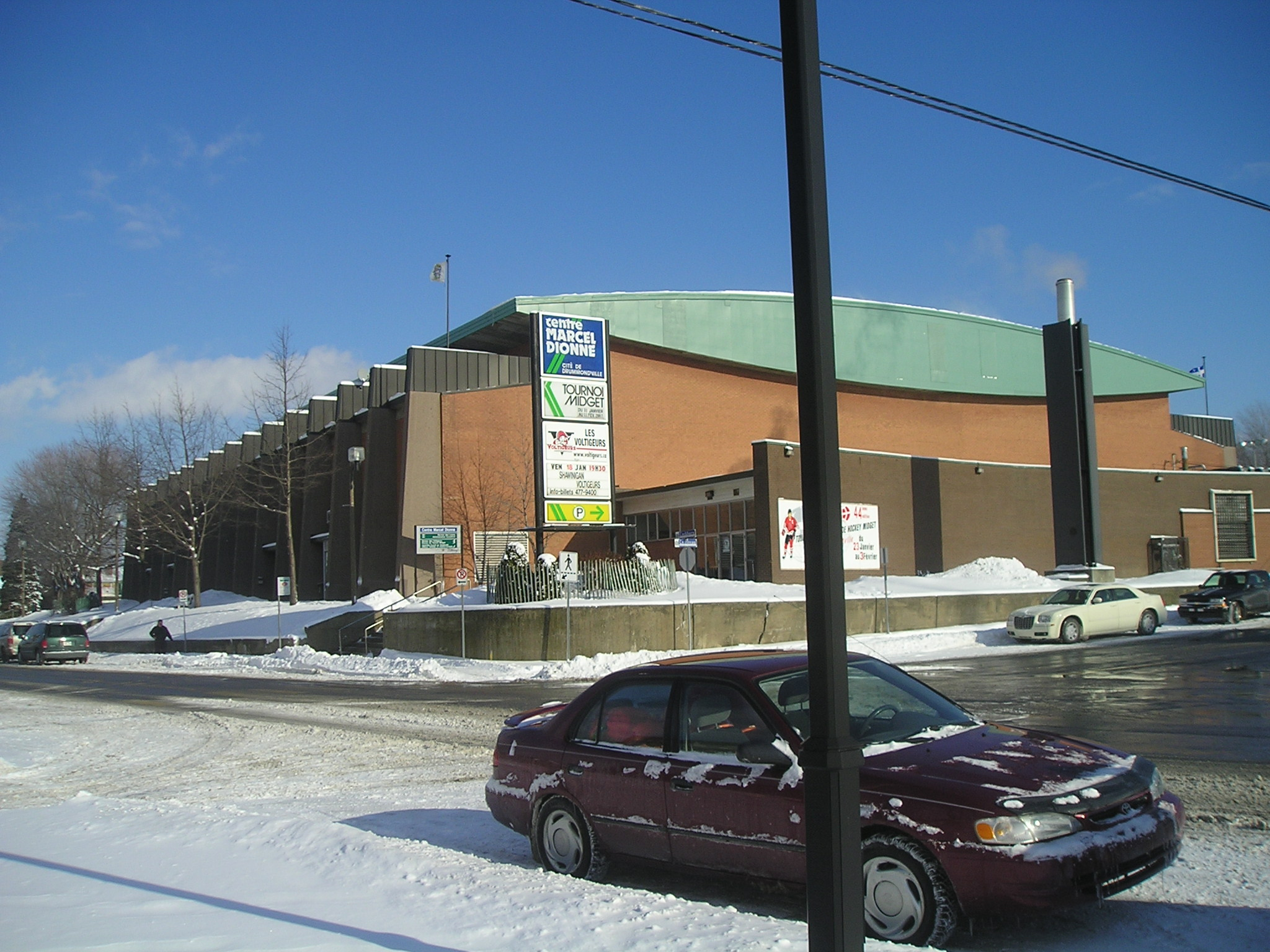
View on the arena
