= Rouyn-Noranda Huskies =

Junior ice hockey team in Rouyn-Noranda, Quebec

Rouyn-Noranda Huskies Huskies de Rouyn-Noranda
- City: Rouyn-Noranda, Quebec
- League: Quebec Maritimes Junior Hockey League
- Conference: Western
- Division: West
- Founded: 1996
- Home arena: Aréna Glencore
- Colours: Black, red, silver and white
- General manager: Yannick Gaucher
- Head coach: Steve Hartley
- Website: www.huskies.qc.ca

Franchise history
- 1933–1972: Montreal Junior Canadiens
- 1972–1975: Montreal Bleu Blanc Rouge
- 1975–1982: Montreal Juniors
- 1982–1984: Verdun Juniors
- 1984–1989: Verdun Junior Canadiens
- 1989–1996: Saint-Hyacinthe Laser
- 1996–present: Rouyn-Noranda Huskies

Championships
- Playoff championships: Memorial Cup; 2019; QMJHL Champions; 2016, 2019

Current uniform

The Rouyn-Noranda Huskies are a Canadian junior ice hockey team in the Quebec Maritimes Junior Hockey League based in Rouyn-Noranda, Quebec. The team plays its home games at the Aréna Glencore. The Huskies finished first overall in the QMJHL, during the 2007–08, 2015–16 and 2018–19 seasons, winning the Jean Rougeau Trophy. The team has won two President's Cups, and represented the QMJHL at the 2016 Memorial Cup, and as the 2019 Memorial Cup winners.

== History ==
The Rouyn-Noranda franchise started out as the Montreal Junior Canadiens. While in Montreal, the team won three Memorial Cups in 1950, 1969 and 1970. The team has since played in Verdun and Saint-Hyacinthe.

On April 25, 1996, Sylvain Danis and Dave Morin, then owners of the Saint-Hyacinthe Laser, decided to transfer the team to Rouyn-Noranda. Aware that the "National Capital of Copper" is a city which breathes hockey, they were confident that it was the best decision for the franchise. Former NHL Hall of Famers from the area include Dave Keon and Jacques Laperrière.

The Huskies name was chosen to represent the tough and determined nature of the local citizens and mining community. The team is currently owned entirely by local interests and all the decisions of the sixteen shareholders are made in the interest of the team and the city which it represents.

Since 1996, the Huskies have won five regular season division titles, in 1998, 2005, 2008, 2010 and 2016. Rouyn-Noranda finished first overall in the QMJHL in 2007–08 winning its first Jean Rougeau Trophy, posting 97 points in the regular season. The 2015-16 season marked the team's 20th anniversary and they posted their best record in franchise history finishing first in the QMJHL with a franchise record 113 points. The team won its first President's Cup since relocating to Rouyn-Noranda in 2016.

The team won its second President's Cup in the 2018-19 season, and went on to win the 2019 Memorial Cup. Mario Pouliot retired from his positions for health reasons on May 25, 2021. In three seasons with the Huskies, he led the team to 113 victories combined in the regular seasons and playoffs.

=== Coaches ===
- Charles Thiffault (1996–1997)
- Jean Pronovost (1997–2001)
- Bob Mongrain (2001–2003)
- André Tourigny (2003–2013)
- Gilles Bouchard (2013–2018)
- Mario Pouliot (2018–2021)
- Brad Yetman (2021–2023)
- Martin Dagenais (2023–2024)
- Steve Hartley (2024–present)

=== Awards ===
George Parsons Trophy
(Most Sportsmanlike at the Memorial Cup)

- 2015-16 Francis Perron

Jean Béliveau Trophy
(Top Scorer)

- 1998–99 Mike Ribeiro
- 2018–19 Peter Abbandonato
- 2023–24 Antonin Verreault

RDS Cup
(Rookie of the year)

- 1997–98 Mike Ribeiro

Michel Bergeron Trophy
(Offensive Rookie of the Year)

- 1997–98 Mike Ribeiro

Paul Dumont Trophy
(Personality of the year)

- 1997–98 Mike Ribeiro

Telus Cup – Offensive
(Offensive player of the year)

- 1997–98 Pierre Dagenais
- 1998–99 James Desmarais

Telus Cup – Defensive
(Defensive player of the year)

- 2000–01 Maxime Ouellet

Marcel Robert Trophy
(Scholastic player of the year)

- 2002–03 Éric L'Italien

== Players ==
=== NHL alumni ===
- Sven Andrighetto
- Jean-Christophe Beaudin
- Alexandre Bolduc
- Marc-André Bourdon
- Mathieu Carle
- Jordan Caron
- Sébastien Centomo
- Patrice Cormier
- Philippe Cornet
- Pierre Dagenais
- Jean-Sébastien Dea
- Guillaume Desbiens
- Nicolas Deslauriers
- Noah Dobson
- William Dufour
- Pascal Dupuis
- Philippe Dupuis
- Alexandre Fortin
- Alexandre Giroux
- A.J. Greer
- Rafaël Harvey-Pinard
- Nikita Kucherov
- Jakub Lauko
- Jérémy Lauzon
- Guillaume Lefebvre
- Maxime Macenauer
- Olivier Magnan
- Timo Meier
- Philippe Myers
- Liam O'Brien
- Maxime Ouellet
- Mike Ribeiro
- Rémi Royer
- Maxime Talbot
- Joël Teasdale
- Ivan Vishnevskiy

== Yearly results ==
=== Regular season ===
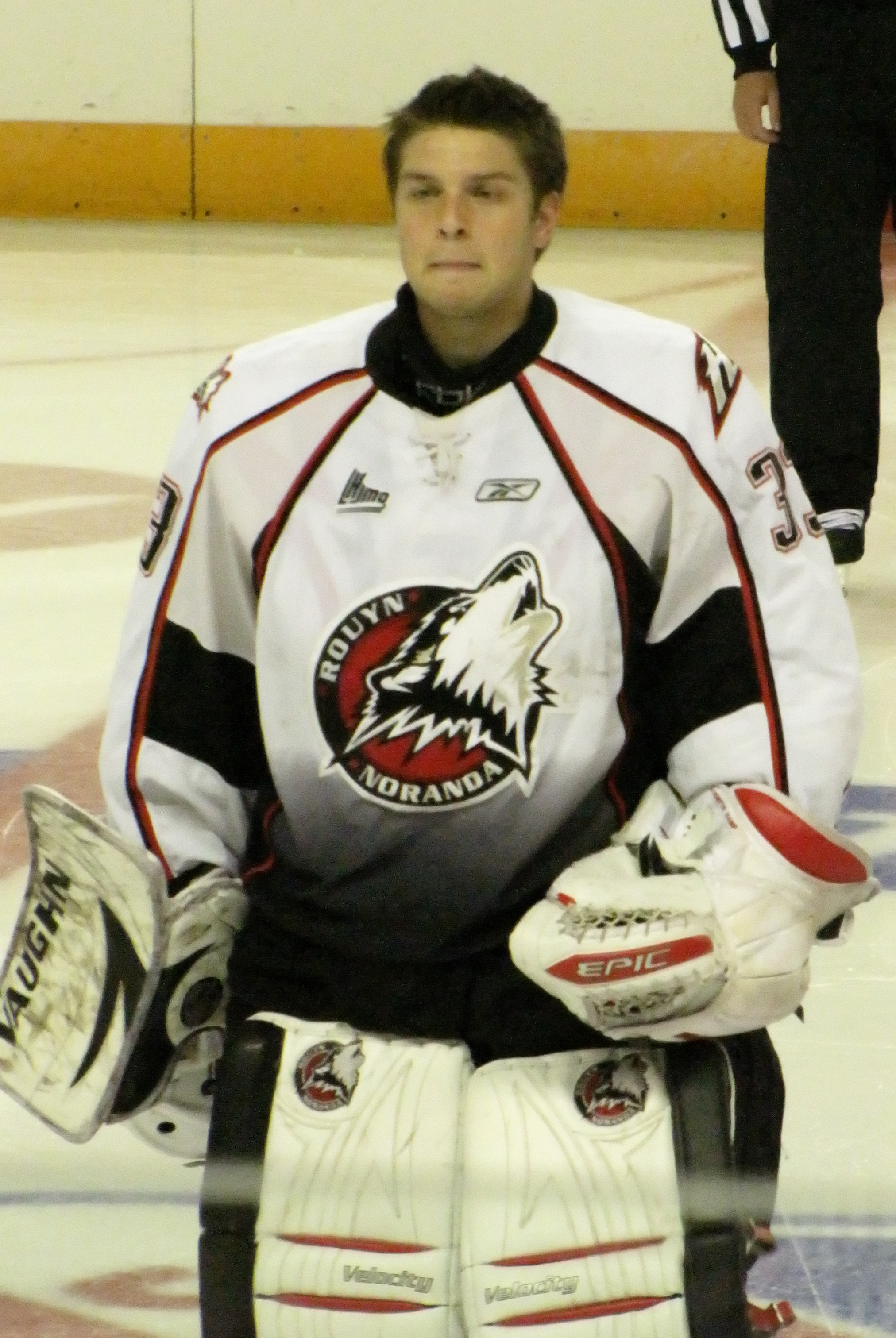
Goaltender Mickael Audette, wearing the jersey as of September 2010

Legend: OTL = Overtime loss, SL = Shootout loss

Season	Games	Won	Lost	Tied	OTL	SL	Points	Pct %	Goals for	Goals against	Standing
1996–97	70	16	49	5	-	-	37	0.264	174	324	7th Lebel
1997–98	70	43	23	4	-	-	90	0.643	338	245	1st Lebel
1998–99	70	36	23	11	-	-	83	0.593	314	261	2nd Lebel
1999–2000	72	33	33	4	2	-	72	0.486	272	288	2nd West
2000–01	72	43	22	5	2	-	93	0.632	318	251	2nd West
2001–02	72	26	36	6	4	-	62	0.403	232	281	3rd West
2002–03	72	31	33	0	8	-	70	0.431	268	273	4th West
2003–04	70	30	27	9	4	-	73	0.493	260	265	3rd West
2004–05	70	31	23	11	5	-	78	0.521	266	244	1st West
2005–06	70	43	22	-	2	3	91	0.614	305	259	3rd West
2006–07	70	36	27	-	3	4	79	0.564	265	266	6th Telus
2007–08	70	47	20	-	2	1	97	0.693	294	238	1st Telus
2008–09	68	30	30	-	5	3	68	0.441	210	245	3rd West
2009–10	68	41	21	-	2	4	88	0.603	256	205	1st West
2010–11	68	12	50	-	4	2	30	0.221	151	339	6th West
2011–12	68	24	36	-	4	4	56	0.412	227	296	5th Telus West
2012–13	68	40	24	-	1	3	84	0.618	283	255	2nd Telus West
2013–14	68	35	28	-	3	2	75	0.551	254	243	5th Telus West
2014–15	68	33	30	-	4	1	71	0.522	246	245	4th West
2015–16	68	54	9	-	3	2	113	0.831	302	181	1st West
2016–17	68	43	18	-	0	2	93	0.684	272	181	1st West
2017–18	68	39	19	-	7	3	88	0.647	239	179	3rd West
2018–19	68	59	8	-	8	1	119	0.875	320	138	1st QMJHL
2019–20	63	29	30	-	2	2	62	0.492	180	209	2nd West
2020–21	40	17	18	-	4	1	39	0.488	100	146	5th West
2021–22	68	28	35	-	1	4	61	0.449	190	256	3rd West
2022–23	68	37	24	-	4	3	81	0.596	240	227	2nd West
2023–24	68	47	15	-	1	5	100	0.735	301	192	1st West
2024–25	64	37	19	-	3	5	82	0.641	258	210	1st West
2025–26	64	40	17	-	5	2	87	0.680	221	178	1st Western

=== Playoffs ===
Season	1st round	2nd round	3rd round	Finals
1996–97	Did not qualify			
1997–98	L, 2–4, Hull	–	–	–
1998–99	Bye	W, 4–3, Sherbrooke	L, 0–4, Hull	–
1999–2000	W, 4–1, Sherbrooke	L, 2–4, Hull	–	–
2000–01	W, 4–1, Hull	L, 0–4, Shawinigan	–	–
2001–02	L, 0–4, Victoriaville	–	–	–
2002–03	L, 0–4, Hull	–	–	–
2003–04	W, 4–3, Lewiston	L, 0–4, Gatineau	–	–
2004–05	Bye	W, 4–2, Moncton	L, 0–4, Halifax	–
2005–06	L, 1–4, Shawinigan	–	–	–
2006–07	W, 4–1, Gatineau	W, 4–3, Drummondville	L, 0–4, Lewiston	–
2007–08	W, 4–0, Val-d'Or	W, 4–0, Rimouski	W, 4–0, Saint John	L, 1–4, Gatineau
2008–09	L, 2–4, Montreal	–	–	–
2009–10	W, 4–2, Val-d'Or	L, 1–4, Moncton	–	–
2010–11	Did not qualify			
2011–12	L, 0–4, Shawinigan	–	–	–
2012–13	W, 4–1, Drummondville	W, 4–1, Quebec	L, 0–4, Halifax	–
2013–14	W, 4–1, Quebec	L, 0–4, Baie-Comeau	–	–
2014–15	L, 2–4, Val-d'Or	–	–	–
2015–16	W, 4–0, Drummondville	W, 4–1, Blainville-Boisbriand	W, 4–2, Moncton	W, 4–1, Shawinigan
2016–17	W, 4–2, Halifax	L, 3–4, Chicoutimi	–	–
2017–18	L, 3–4, Sherbrooke	–	–	–
2018–19	W, 4–2, Shawinigan	W, 4–0, Victoriaville	W, 4–0, Rimouski	W, 4–2, Halifax
2019–20	QMJHL playoffs cancelled			
2020–21	L, 0–3, Victoriaville	–	–	–
2021–22	L, 0–3, Shawinigan	–	–	–
2022–23	W, 4–1, Shawinigan	L, 0–4, Gatineau	–	–
2023–24	W, 4–1, Gatineau	L, 1–4, Victoriaville	–	–
2024–25	W, 4–0, Gatineau	W, 4–0, Halifax	L, 0–4, Moncton	–
2025–26	W, 4–3, Gatineau	W, 4–0, Shawinigan	L, 2–4, Chicoutimi	–

=== Memorial Cup ===
2016
Finished round-robin portion in 3rd place with 1–2 record.
Defeated Red Deer Rebels 3–1 in semifinal.
Lost to London Knights 3–2 in final. Finished 2nd place in Memorial Cup.

2019
Finished round-robin portion in 3rd place with 2–1 record.
Defeated Guelph Storm 6–4 in semifinal.
Defeated Halifax Mooseheads 4–2 in final. Won Memorial Cup.
