= Centre d'Excellence Sports Rousseau =

Multi-purpose arena in Boisbriand, Quebec

Coordinates: 45°37′53″N 73°51′31″W

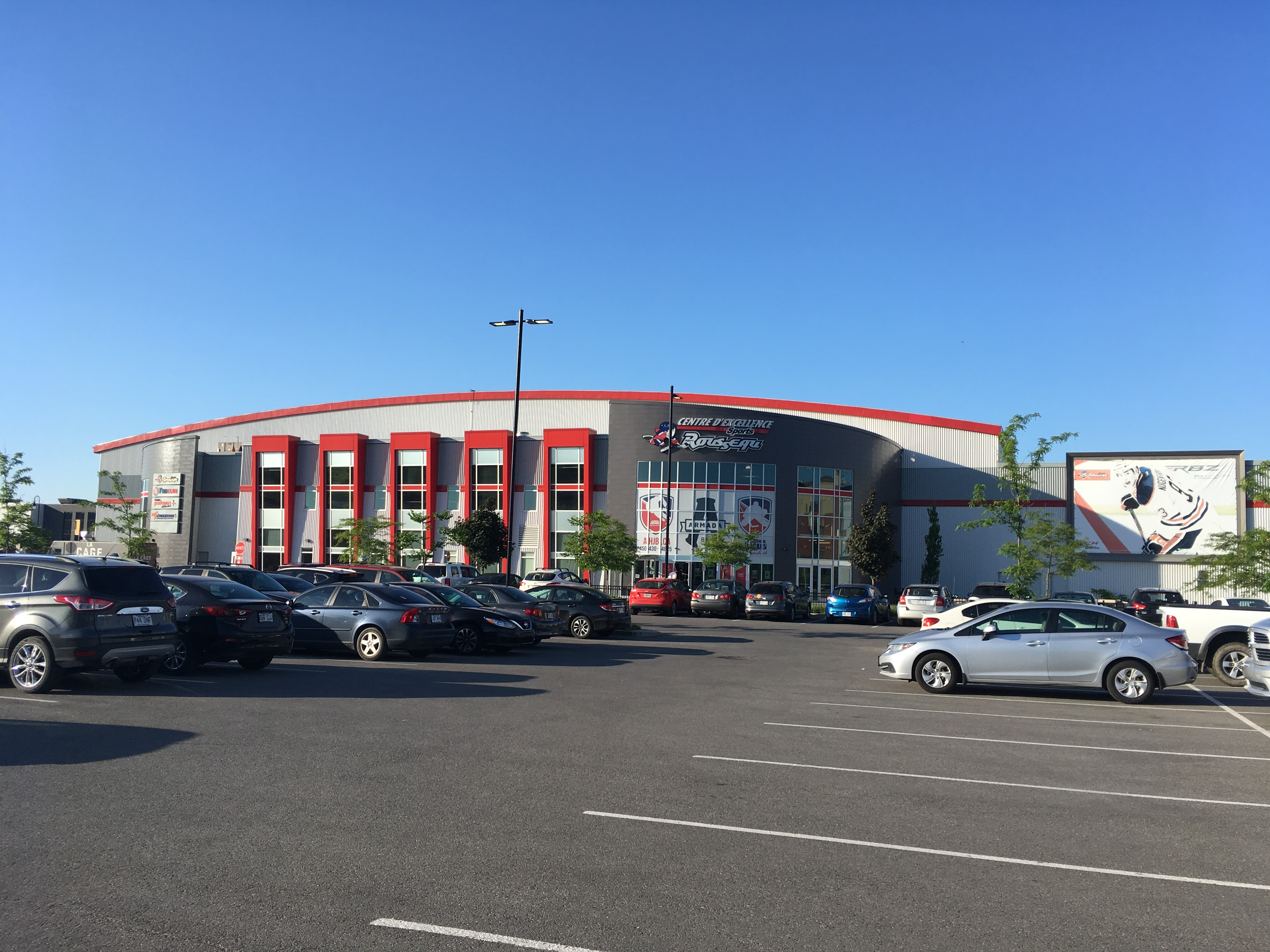

- Location within Quebec Location within Canada
- Location: 3600, boulevard Grande-Allée; Boisbriand, Quebec; J7H 1M9
- Owner: Blainville
- Operator: Boisbriand
- Capacity: Hockey: 3,100 (fixed), 3,250 (standing room)

Construction
- Groundbreaking: 2009
- Opened: 2011
- Cost: C$20.1 million
- Architect: Tremblay L'Écuyer Architectes

Tenants
- Blainville-Boisbriand Armada; Laser de Boisbriand; Le Fan Club restaurant Sports Rousseau (hockey store); La ligue de hockey Sportech (adult hockey league); Centre Performe Plus Joël Bouchard

The Centre d'Excellence Sports Rousseau is a 3,100 capacity multi-purpose arena in Boisbriand, Quebec, Canada. It is home to the Blainville-Boisbriand Armada ice hockey club in the QMJHL, who were previously known as the Montreal Junior Hockey Club.

The area has ice surface dimensions available:

- 200 x 85 for hockey
- 130 x 65 for 3 on 3 events
- 55 x 30 for other events
