= Centre Henry-Leonard =

Multi-purpose arena in Baie-Comeau, Quebec, Canada

Coordinates: 49°12′37″N 68°09′46″W

The Centre Henry-Leonard is a 3,042 capacity (2,779 seated) multi-purpose arena in Baie-Comeau, Quebec, Canada. It is home to the Baie-Comeau Drakkar ice hockey team of the Quebec Maritimes Junior Hockey League. It was built in 1970.
