= Rimouski Océanic =

Junior ice hockey team in Rimouski, Quebec

Rimouski Océanic Océanic de Rimouski
- City: Rimouski, Quebec
- League: Quebec Maritimes Junior Hockey League
- Conference: Eastern
- Division: East
- Founded: 1995
- Home arena: Colisée Financière Sun Life
- Colours: Royal blue, white and navy blue
- General manager: Danny Dupont
- Head coach: Joel Perrault
- Website: https://chl.ca/lhjmq-oceanic/

Franchise history
- 1969–1982: Sherbrooke Castors
- 1982–1989: Saint-Jean Castors
- 1989–1995: Saint-Jean Lynx
- 1995–present: Rimouski Océanic

Championships
- Playoff championships: Memorial Cup: 2000; QMJHL: 2000, 2005, 2015

Current uniform

The Rimouski Océanic are a Canadian junior ice hockey team in the Quebec Maritimes Junior Hockey League (QMJHL). The franchise was granted for the 1969–70 season as the Sherbrooke Castors. The Castors played in Sherbrooke from 1969 to 1982 before moving to Saint-Jean-sur-Richelieu, Quebec, in 1982 to become the Saint-Jean Castors. In 1989, the team was renamed the Saint-Jean Lynx. In 1995, the team then moved to Rimouski, Quebec, to become the Rimouski Océanic.

== History ==
The team won the QMJHL championship in the 1999–2000 season and went on to win the Memorial Cup that year, with a team featuring future NHL star Brad Richards.

Sidney Crosby joined the team during the 2003–04 QMJHL season. Crosby's 135 points for the club set a new record for a 16-year-old in the QMJHL and was second only to Wayne Gretzky in that particular age-group for all Canadian hockey.

In 2005, the Océanic set a QMJHL record after going 28 consecutive games without a loss. The team then went on to win seven games in a row in the playoffs, improving the unbeaten streak to an unofficial 35-straight. They won their second QMJHL championship in five years and subsequently represented the QMJHL in the 2005 Memorial Cup. After losing the opener against the hometown London Knights, the Océanic beat both the defending Memorial Cup champion Kelowna Rockets, who were in their third-straight Memorial Cup, and the Ottawa 67's. Rimouski then beat the 67's again in the semi-finals to set up a rematch of their opening game against the Knights. However, the Océanic were shut out in the final game 4–0.

The QMJHL announced on April 3, 2008, that the Océanic were chosen to host the 2009 Memorial Cup.

In the 2014–15 season, the Océanic captured the QMJHL championship in double overtime of the seventh game against the Quebec Remparts. Because the Remparts were the hosts of 2015 Memorial Cup, they had already qualified for the Memorial Cup tournament prior to the QMJHL final, thus entering Rimouski into the Cup tournament. The Océanic finished 1–2 in the round robin portion in the tournament, advancing to the tie-breaker to play the Remparts, ultimately losing 5–2.

== Logo and jerseys ==
The Océanic logo is an ocean liner with a set of teeth on the bow, jutting out of waves creating both a profile that suggests both a striking shark and a fleur-de-lis. The team colours are royal blue, navy blue and white, and their home arena is the Colisée Financière Sun Life.

The team's sweater has proven popular in the United States, as Reebok has issued it with Crosby's number 87 on it.

== Playoff results ==
Season-by-season playoff results.

Season	1st round	2nd round	3rd round	Finals
1995–96	Round-robin - advanced	L, 0–4, Beauport	-	-
1996–97	L, 1–3, Chicoutimi	-	-	-
1997–98	W, 4–1, Halifax	1st, round-robin, Quebec/Moncton	W, 4–2, Quebec	L, 0–4, Val-d'Or
1998–99	W, 4–0, Moncton	L, 3–4, Quebec	-	-
1999–2000	Bye	W, 4–0, Halifax	W, 4–1, Moncton	W, 4–1, Hull
2000–01	W, 4–2, Halifax	L, 1–4, Baie-Comeau	-	-
2001–02	L, 3–4, Halifax	-	-	-
2002–03	-	-	-	-
2003–04	Bye	W, 4–0, Shawinigan	L, 1–4, Moncton	-
2004–05	Bye	W, 4–0, Lewiston	W, 4–1, Chicoutimi	W, 4–0, Halifax
2005–06	-	-	-	-
2006–07	-	-	-	-
2007–08	W, 4–1, Baie-Comeau	L, 0–4, Rouyn-Noranda	-	-
2008–09	W, 4–0, Chicoutimi	W, 4–1, Moncton	L, 0–4, Drummondville	-
2009–10	W, 4–3, Chicoutimi	L, 1–4, Drummondville	-	-
2010–11	L, 1–4, Gatineau	-	-	-
2011–12	W, 4–0, Val-d'Or	W, 4–3, Blainville-Boisbriand	W, 4–2, Halifax	L, 0–4, Saint John
2012–13	L, 2–4, Gatineau	-	-	-
2013–14	W, 4–0, Chicoutimi	L, 3–4, Blainville-Boisbriand	-	-
2014–15	W, 4–0, Victoriaville	W, 4–1, Gatineau	W, 4–0, Val-d'Or	W, 4–3, Quebec
2015–16	L, 2–4, Charlottetown	-	-	-
2016–17	L, 0–4, Saint John	-	-	-
2017–18	L, 3–4, Moncton	-	-	-
2018–19	W, 4–0, Chicoutimi	W, 4–1, Cape Breton	L, 0–4, Rouyn-Noranda	-
2019–20	QMJHL playoffs cancelled			
2020–21	W, 3–2, Shawinigan	L, 0–3, Val-d'Or	-	-
2021–22	W, 3–2, Saint John	L, 1–3, Quebec	-	-
2022–23	W, 4–1, Chicoutimi	L, 0–4, Quebec	-	-
2023–24	L, 1–4, Cape Breton	-	-	-
2024–25	W, 4–0, Charlottetown	W, 4–2, Chicoutimi	W, 4–3, Shawinigan	L, 2–4, Moncton
2025–26	-	-	-	-

== Players ==
=== Retired numbers ===
- Allan Sirois's # 12 was retired on September, 20, 2003.
- Vincent Lecavalier's # 4 was retired on September, 26, 2004.
- Brad Richards's # 39 was retired on September, 26, 2004.
- Jonathan Beaulieu's # 9 was retired on March, 10, 2006.
- Michel Ouellet's # 28 was retired on January, 30, 2015.
- Sidney Crosby's # 87 was retired on September, 27, 2019, and retired for all teams in the QMJHL.

=== NHL alumni ===
Alumni of the Océanic who have played in the National Hockey League.

- Éric Bélanger
- Francis Bélanger
- Alex Belzile
- Zachary Bolduc
- Marc-André Bourdon
- Jordan Caron
- Sébastien Caron
- Ryane Clowe
- Patrice Cormier
- Philippe Cornet
- Patrick Coulombe
- Sidney Crosby
- Cédrick Desjardins
- Michael Frolik
- Frédérik Gauthier
- Aaron Johnson
- Juraj Kolnik
- Samuel Laberge
- Alexis Lafrenière
- Vincent Lecavalier
- Maxime Macenauer
- Tomas Malec
- Samuel Morin
- Liam O'Brien
- Michel Ouellet
- Jean-Marc Pelletier
- Marc-Antoine Pouliot
- Adam Raska
- Brad Richards
- Philippe Sauvé
- Petr Straka
- Derrick Walser
