= Blainville-Boisbriand Armada =

Junior ice hockey team in Boisbriand, Quebec

Blainville-Boisbriand Armada Armada de Blainville-Boisbriand
- City: Boisbriand, Quebec
- League: Quebec Maritimes Junior Hockey League
- Conference: Western
- Division: West
- Founded: 2011
- Home arena: Centre d'Excellence Sports Rousseau
- Colours: Black and white
- General manager: Olivier Picard
- Head coach: Alexandre Jacques
- Website: armadahockey.ca

Franchise history
- 2005–2008: St. John's Fog Devils
- 2008–2011: Montreal Junior
- 2011–present: Blainville-Boisbriand Armada

Current uniform

The Blainville-Boisbriand Armada are a Canadian junior ice hockey team of the Quebec Maritimes Junior Hockey League. The team is based in Boisbriand, Quebec, Canada, and plays its home games at the Centre d'Excellence Sports Rousseau.

== History ==
The Armada started as the St. John's Fog Devils when Newfoundland was granted an expansion franchise. The team was sold to a group intending to move it to Montreal for the 2008–09 season where it became the Montreal Junior Hockey Club. In June 2011, the Quebec Major Junior Hockey League approved the sale of the Juniors to a group led by former NHL defenceman Joël Bouchard, who moved the team to Boisbriand, Quebec, for the 2011–12 season. On July 12, 2011, the team unveiled its new name, logo and colours.

In 2018, head coach and general manager Joël Bouchard was hired by the Montreal Canadiens to coach their minor league affiliate in the American Hockey League, the Laval Rocket for the 2018–19 season.

== Season-by-season records ==
Note: GP = Games played, W = Wins, L = Losses, OTL = Overtime losses, SOL = Shootout losses, Pts = Points, GF = Goals for, GA = Goals against

Season	GP	W	L	OTL	SOL	Pts	GF	GA	Finish	Playoffs
2011–12	68	40	22	4	2	86	258	219	1st, Telus West	Won first round, 4–0 vs. Gatineau; Lost second round, 3–4 to Rimouski
2012–13	68	41	19	2	6	90	272	182	1st, Telus West	Won first round, 4–1 vs. Acadie-Bathurst; Won second round, 4–0 vs. Val-d'Or; Lost semifinals, 2–4 vs. Baie-Comeau
2013–14	68	41	17	5	5	92	243	196	2nd, Telus West	Won first round, 4–2 vs. Moncton; Won second round, 4–3 vs. Rimouski; Lost semifinals, 3–4 vs. Baie-Comeau
2014–15	68	41	18	7	2	91	244	185	1st, West	Lost first round, 2–4 vs. Gatineau
2015–16	68	26	32	8	2	62	171	201	4th, West	Won first round, 4–2 vs. Val d'Or; Lost second round, 1–4 vs. Rouyn-Noranda
2016–17	68	43	19	4	2	92	224	171	2nd, West	Won first round, 4–0 vs. Drummondville; Won second round, 4–3 vs. Acadie–Bathurst; Won semifinals, 4–1 vs. Charlottetown; Lost finals 0–4 vs. Saint John
2017–18	68	50	11	4	3	107	276	184	1st, West	Won first round, 4–0 vs. Val-d'Or; Won second round, 4–1 vs. Moncton; Won semifinals, 4–3 vs. Charlottetown; Lost finals, 2–4 vs. Acadie–Bathurst
2018–19	68	26	40	2	0	54	196	270	6th, West	Lost first round, 1–4 vs. Sherbrooke
2019–20	63	32	27	2	2	68	212	219	1st, West	Postseason cancelled due to COVID-19 pandemic
2020–21	32	18	10	4	0	40	133	118	2nd, West	Won first round, 3–1 vs. Gatineau; Lost quarterfinals, 2–3 vs. Victoriaville
2021–22	68	30	29	5	4	69	225	259	5th, West	Won first round, 3–1 vs. Drummondville; Lost second round, 0–3 vs. Sherbrooke
2022–23	68	22	37	6	3	53	206	261	7th, West	Lost first round, 0–4 vs. Sherbrooke
2023–24	68	31	31	4	2	68	214	230	5th, West	Lost first round, 3–4 vs. Sherbrooke
2024–25	64	34	21	7	2	77	248	209	4th, West	Lost first round, 1–4 vs. Sherbrooke
2025–26	64	40	18	5	1	86	270	176	2nd, West	Won first round, 4–0 vs. Victoriaville; Won second round, 4–2 vs. Newfoundland; Lost semifinals, 3–4 vs. Moncton

== NHL alumni ==
- Alex Barre-Boulet
- Drake Batherson
- Samuel Bolduc
- Pierre-Luc Dubois
- Danick Martel
- Stefan Matteau
- Sam Montembeault
- Xavier Ouellet
- Cedric Paquette
- Joel Teasdale
- Daniel Walcott
