= 2011 Memorial Cup =

Canadian junior men's ice hockey championship

2011 Mastercard Memorial Cup

Tournament details
- Venue(s): Hershey Centre; Mississauga, Ontario
- Dates: May 20–29, 2011
- Teams: 4
- Host team: Mississauga St. Michael's Majors (OHL)
- TV partner(s): Sportsnet, RDS

Final positions
- Champions: Saint John Sea Dogs (QMJHL) (1st title)
- Runners-up: Mississauga St. Michael's Majors (OHL)

Tournament statistics
- Games played: 9
- Attendance: 48,248 (5,361 per game)
- Scoring leader: Andrew Shaw (Attack) (7 points)

Awards
- MVP: Jonathan Huberdeau (Sea Dogs)

The Memorial Cup trophy

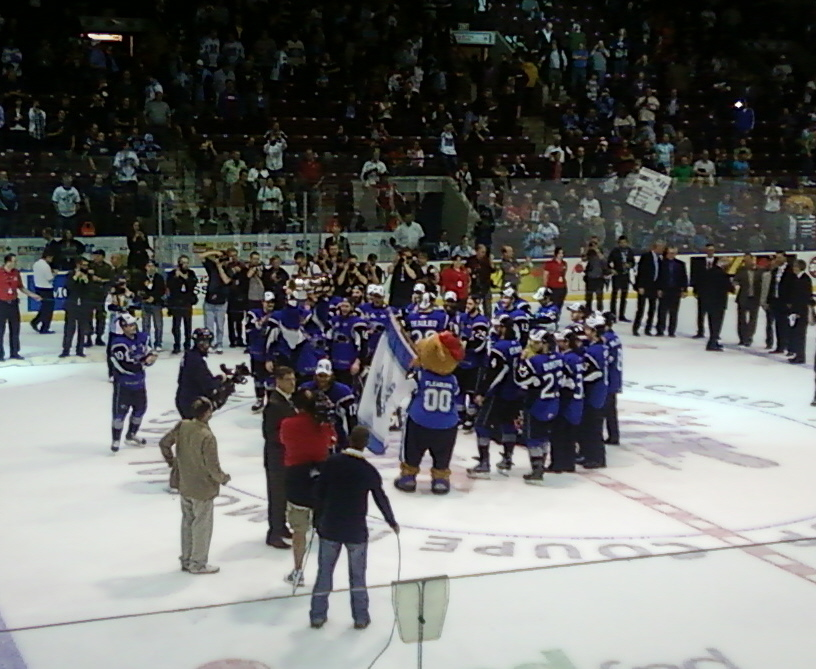
Saint John Sea Dogs celebrate winning the Memorial Cup

The 2011 Memorial Cup was a four-team round-robin format ice hockey tournament played from May 20–29, 2011 in Mississauga, Ontario. It was the 93rd annual Memorial Cup competition and determined the major junior ice hockey champion of the Canadian Hockey League (CHL). The Ontario Hockey League (OHL) announced on May 10, 2010 that the Mississauga St. Michael's Majors were chosen to host the event at the Hershey Centre. Other tournament participants included the Owen Sound Attack from the Ontario Hockey League (OHL), the Saint John Sea Dogs from the Quebec Major Junior Hockey League (QMJHL) and the Kootenay Ice from the Western Hockey League (WHL).

The Majors won the right to host the event over the Barrie Colts, Kingston Frontenacs and Windsor Spitfires.

The Saint John Sea Dogs defeated the Mississauga St. Michael's Majors 3–1 in the final to win the title for the first time, and as a result, became the first team based in Canada's Maritime Provinces to win the Memorial Cup.

== Round-robin Standings ==
Pos	Team	Pld	W	L	GF	GA	GD	
1	Saint John Sea Dogs (QMJHL)	3	2	1	11	10	+1	Advanced directly to the championship game
2	Mississauga St. Michael's Majors (Host/OHL)	3	2	1	8	6	+2	Advanced to the semifinal game
3	Owen Sound Attack (OHL)	3	1	2	8	6	+2	
4	Kootenay Ice (WHL) (Note: Kootenay finished fourth based on head-to-head round-robin matchups, but defeated Owen Sound in the tiebreaker game.)	3	1	2	6	11	−5	Advanced to the semifinal game

== Schedule ==
All times local (UTC −5)

=== Round Robin ===
May 20	Saint John Sea Dogs	4–3	Mississauga St. Michael's Majors	Hershey Centre, Mississauga, Ontario	Recap
Tomáš Jurčo (1) – 1:44; Jonathan Huberdeau (1) – pp – 17:35		First period	7:07 – Casey Cizikas (1); 13:55 – pp – Devante Smith-Pelly (1)
Michael Kirkpatrick (1) – pp – 6:58		Second period	No scoring
Nathan Beaulieu (1) – pp – 8:00		Third period	8:33 – pp – Casey Cizikas (2)
Jacob DeSerres 24 saves / 27 shots		Goalie stats	J. P. Anderson 27 saves / 31 shots

May 21	Owen Sound Attack	5–0	Kootenay Ice	Hershey Centre, Mississauga, Ontario	Recap
Robby Mignardi (1) – 16:49		First period	No scoring.
Roman Berdnikov (1) – 3:30		Second period	No scoring
Robby Mignardi (2) – sh – 12:29; Andrew Fritsch (1) – pp – 16:23; Garrett Wilson (1) – pp– 17:27		Third period	No scoring
Jordan Binnington 29 saves / 29 shots		Goalie stats	Nathan Lieuwen 27 saves / 32 shots

May 22	Mississauga St. Michael's Majors	2–1	Kootenay Ice	Hershey Centre, Mississauga, Ontario	Recap
Maxim Kitsyn (1) – 9:18		First period	7:55 – pp – Cody Eakin (1)
No scoring		Second period	No scoring
Rob Flick (1) – 11:51		Third period	No scoring
J. P. Anderson 32 saves / 33 shots		Goalie stats	Nathan Lieuwen 32 saves / 34 shots

May 23	Owen Sound Attack	2–3	OT	Saint John Sea Dogs	Hershey Centre, Mississauga, Ontario	Recap
Matt Petgrave (1) – 6:36; Andrew Shaw (1) – pp – 14:23		First period		No scoring
No scoring		Second period		13:49 – pp – Stanislav Galiev (1)
No Scoring		Third period		16:33 – Tomáš Jurčo (2)
No scoring		First overtime period		17:35 – Jonathan Huberdeau (2)
Jordan Binnington 41 saves / 44 shots		Goalie stats		Jacob DeSerres 47 saves / 49 shots

May 24	Kootenay Ice	5–4	OT	Saint John Sea Dogs	Hershey Centre, Mississauga, Ontario	Recap
No scoring		First period		No scoring
Drew Czerwonka (1) – pp – 13:13; Kevin King (1) – pp – 15:10		Second period		1:26 – Ryan Tesnik (1); 5:33 – Tomáš Jurčo (3)
Jesse Ismond (1) – 0:23; Matt Fraser (1) – pp – 7:19		Third period		2:10 – Kevin Gagné (1); 19:45 – Tomáš Jurčo (4)
Matt Fraser (2) – 3:55		First overtime period		No scoring
Nathan Lieuwen 19 saves / 23 shots		Goalie stats		Mathieu Corbeil-Thériault 40 saves / 45 shots

May 25	Mississauga St. Michael's Majors	3–1	Owen Sound Attack	Hershey Centre, Mississauga, Ontario	Recap
Jordan Mayer (1) – 8:01		First period	No Scoring
Rob Flick (2) – pp – 18:24		Second period	8:00 – Andrew Shaw (2)
Justin Shugg (1) – en – 19:25		Third period	No scoring
J. P. Anderson 21 saves / 22 shots		Goalie stats	Jordan Binnington 25 saves / 27 shots

=== Playoff round ===
Tiebreaker

May 26	Kootenay Ice	7–3	Owen Sound Attack	Hershey Centre, Mississauga, Ontario	Recap
No scoring		First period	7:12 – Cameron Brace (1); 13:55 – Jarrod Maidens (1)
Erik Benoit (1) – 7:48; Joe Antilla (1) – sh – 8:01; Matt Fraser (3) – pp – 11:14		Second period	No scoring
Matt Fraser (4) – pp – 1:13; Cody Eakin (2) – 3:24; Max Reinhart (1) – sh – 4:59; Cody Eakin (3) – en – 17:28		Third period	5:37 – pp – Mike Halmo (1)
Nathan Lieuwen 28 saves / 31 shots		Goalie stats	Scott Stajcer 25 saves / 31 shots Jordan Binnington 3 saves / 3 shots

Semi-final

May 27	Kootenay Ice	1–3	Mississauga St. Michael's Majors	Hershey Centre, Mississauga, Ontario	Recap
No scoring		First period	1:03 – pp – Devante Smith-Pelly (2)
Joe Antilla (2) – pp – 19:59		Second period	17:40 – Devante Smith-Pelly (3)
No scoring		Third period	19:05 – en – Chris DeSousa (1)
Nathan Lieuwen 23 saves / 25 shots		Goalie stats	J. P. Anderson 28 saves / 29 shots

Final

May 29	Mississauga St. Michael's Majors	1–3	Saint John Sea Dogs	Hershey Centre, Mississauga, Ontario	Recap
No scoring		First period	2:24 – sh – Simon Després (1)
Riley Brace (1) – 14:41		Second period	13:17 – Zack Phillips (1)
No scoring		Third period	16:17 – Jonathan Huberdeau (3)
J. P. Anderson 22 saves / 25 shots		Goalie stats	Jacob DeSerres 34 saves / 35 shots

== Statistical leaders ==
=== Skaters ===
Player	Team	GP	G	A	Pts	PIM
Andrew Shaw	Owen Sound Attack	4	2	5	7	16
Matt Fraser	Kootenay Ice	5	4	2	6	2
Jonathan Huberdeau	Saint John Sea Dogs	4	3	3	6	4
Cody Eakin	Kootenay Ice	5	3	3	6	4
Devante Smith-Pelly	Mississauga St. Michael's Majors	5	3	3	6	4
Max Reinhart	Kootenay Ice	5	1	5	6	2
Tomáš Jurčo	Saint John Sea Dogs	4	4	1	5	2
Michael Kirkpatrick	Saint John Sea Dogs	3	1	4	5	4
Mike Halmo	Owen Sound Attack	4	1	4	5	6
Zack Phillips	Saint John Sea Dogs	4	1	4	5	0

GP = Games played; G = Goals; A = Assists; Pts = Points; PIM = Penalty minutes

=== Goaltending ===
This is a combined table of the top goaltenders based on goals against average and save percentage with at least sixty minutes played. The table is sorted by GAA.

Player	Team	GP	W	L	SA	GA	GAA	SV%	SO	TOI
Jordan Binnington	Owen Sound Attack	4	1	2	98	5	1.42	.951	1	211:00
Jacob DeSerres	Saint John Sea Dogs	3	3	0	111	6	1.82	.946	0	198:00
J. P. Anderson	Mississauga St. Michael's Majors	5	3	2	140	10	2.02	.929	0	297:00
Nathan Lieuwen	Kootenay Ice	5	2	3	146	16	3.18	.890	0	302:00
Mathieu Corbeil-Thériault	Saint John Sea Dogs	1	0	1	40	5	4.81	.889	0	62:00

GP = Games played; W = Wins; L = Losses; SA = Shots against; GA = Goals against; GAA = Goals against average; SV% = Save percentage; SO = Shutouts; TOI = Time on ice (minutes:seconds)

== Rosters ==
=== Mississauga St. Michael's Majors (Host/OHL) ===
- Head coach: Dave Cameron

Pos.	No.	Player
GK	31	Mickael Audette
GK	34	J. P. Anderson
D	2	Dylan DeMelo
D	5	Stuart Percy
D	6	Michael D'Orazio
D	7	Alex Cord
D	10	Brett Fleming
D	15	David Corrente
D	22	Marc Cantin
F	4	Justin Shugg
F	8	Derek Shoenmakers
F	11	Casey Cizikas
F	12	Jamie Wise
F	13	Maxim Kitsyn
F	14	Corey Bureau
F	16	Joseph Cramarossa
F	17	Justin Rasmussen
F	19	Jordan Mayer
F	23	Devante Smith-Pelly
F	24	Gregg Sutch
F	25	Riley Brace
F	26	Rob Flick
F	27	Mika Partanen
F	28	Chris DeSousa

=== Owen Sound Attack (OHL) ===
- Head coach:Mark Reeds

Pos.	No.	Player
GK	31	Jordan Binnington
GK	35	Michael Zador
GK	40	Scott Stajcer
D	2	Keevin Cutting
D	3	Greg Staeger
D	4	Jay Gilbert
D	6	Brayden Rose
D	12	Jesse Blacker
D	22	Matt Petgrave
D	24	Matt Stanisz
D	26	Geoffrey Schemitsch
F	7	Jarrod Maidens
F	8	Roman Berdnikov
F	9	Gemel Smith
F	10	Robby Mignardi
F	11	Cameron Brace
F	15	Andrew Shaw
F	17	Garrett Wilson
F	18	Joey Hishon
F	19	Andrew Fritsch
F	20	Brendan Childerley
F	21	Holden Cook
F	25	Daniel Zweep
F	28	Mike Halmo
F	29	Kurtis Gabriel
F	37	Liam Heelis

=== Kootenay Ice (WHL) ===
- Head coach: Kris Knoblauch

Pos.	No.	Player
GK	1	Mackenzie Skapski
GK	29	Brett Teskey
GK	31	Nathan Lieuwen
D	2	Hayden Rintoul
D	3	Brayden McNabb
D	4	James Martin
D	5	Jagger Dirk
D	6	Luke Paulsen
D	14	Mike Simpson
D	24	Joey Leach
D	27	John Neilbrandt
F	7	Kevin King
F	8	Adam Rossignol
F	9	Cody Eakin
F	11	Matt Fraser
F	12	Sam Reinhart
F	15	Steele Boomer
F	17	Elgin Pearce
F	18	Jesse Ismond
F	19	Drew Czerwonka
F	20	Joe Antilla
F	21	Brock Montgomery
F	22	Erik Benoit
F	23	Max Reinhart
F	25	Brendan Hurley

=== Saint John Sea Dogs (QMJHL) ===
- Head coach: Gerard Gallant

Pos.	No.	Player
GK	1	Jacob DeSerres
GK	35	Mathieu Corbeil-Thériault
D	4	Éric Gélinas
D	5	Gabriel Bourret
D	6	Jason Seed
D	21	Kevin Gagné
D	23	Pierre Durepos
D	28	Nathan Beaulieu
D	47	Simon Després
F	7	Zack Phillips
F	9	Stephen MacAulay
F	10	Michael Kirkpatrick
F	11	Jonathan Huberdeau
F	13	Tomáš Jurčo
F	14	Jason Cameron
F	15	Scott Oke
F	16	Steven Anthony
F	17	Mike Thomas
F	18	Danick Gauthier
F	19	Ryan Tesink
F	22	Aidan Kelly
F	25	Alexandre Beauregard
F	97	Stanislav Galiev

== Awards ==
- Stafford Smythe Memorial Trophy (MVP) – Jonathan Huberdeau (Saint John Sea Dogs)
- Ed Chynoweth Trophy (Leading Scorer) – Andrew Shaw (Owen Sound Attack)
- George Parsons Trophy (Sportsmanlike) – Marc Cantin (Mississauga St. Michael's Majors)
- Hap Emms Memorial Trophy (Top Goalie) – Jordan Binnington (Owen Sound Attack)
- All-Star Team:

Goaltender: Jordan Binnington (Owen Sound Attack)
Defence: Stuart Percy (Mississauga St. Michael's Majors), Nathan Beaulieu (Saint John Sea Dogs)
Forwards: Andrew Shaw (Owen Sound Attack), Devante Smith-Pelly (Mississauga St. Michael's Majors), Jonathan Huberdeau (Saint John Sea Dogs)

== Road to the Cup ==
=== OHL playoffs ===
Conference Quarter-finals	Conference Semi-finals
1	Mississauga	4
8	Belleville	0
1	Mississauga	4
7	Sudbury	0
2	Ottawa	0
7	Sudbury	4
Eastern
3	Niagara	4
6	Brampton	0
3	Niagara	4
4	Oshawa	1
4	Oshawa	4
5	Kingston	1
1	Owen Sound	4
8	London	2
1	Owen Sound	4
6	Plymouth	0
3	Kitchener	3
6	Plymouth	4
Western
2	Saginaw	4
7	Guelph	2
2	Saginaw	2
4	Windsor	4
4	Windsor	4
5	Erie	3

Conference Finals
1	Mississauga	4
3	Niagara	1
1	Owen Sound	4
4	Windsor	1

OHL Championship
E1	Mississauga	3
W1	Owen Sound	4

=== QMJHL playoffs ===
Round 1
1	Saint John	4
16	Cape Breton	0
6	Acadie-Bathurst	0
11	Victoriaville	4
2	Montréal	4
15	Halifax	0
8	Lewiston	4
9	Moncton	1
3	Québec	4
14	Val-d'Or	0
7	Shawinigan	4
10	P.E.I.	1
4	Drummondville	4
13	Chicoutimi	0
5	Gatineau	4
12	Rimouski	1

Quarter-finals
1	Saint John	4
11	Victoriaville	1
2	Montréal	2
8	Lewiston	4
3	Québec	4
7	Shawinigan	3
4	Drummondville	3
5	Gatineau	4

Semi-finals
1	Saint John	4
8	Lewiston	0
3	Québec	3
5	Gatineau	4

President Cup Championship
1	Saint John	4
5	Gatineau	2

=== WHL playoffs ===
Conference Quarter-finals	Conference Semi-finals
1	Saskatoon	4
8	Prince Albert	2
1	Saskatoon	0
4	Kootenay	4
4	Kootenay	4
5	Moose Jaw	2
Eastern
2	Red Deer	4
7	Edmonton	0
2	Red Deer	1
3	Medicine Hat	4
3	Medicine Hat	4
6	Brandon	2
1	Portland	4
8	Everett	0
1	Portland	4
2	Kelowna	2
2	Kelowna	4
7	Prince George	0
Western
3	Spokane	4
6	Chilliwack	1
3	Spokane	4
4	Tri-City	2
4	Tri-City	4
5	Vancouver	0

Conference Finals
3	Medicine Hat	0
4	Kootenay	4
1	Portland	4
3	Spokane	2

WHL Championship
E4	Kootenay	4
W1	Portland	1
