= David Štich =

Czech ice hockey player

- Born: 15 April 1989 (age 35); Plzeň, Czechoslovakia
- Height: 6 ft 2 in (188 cm)
- Weight: 229 lb (104 kg; 16 st 5 lb)
- Position: Defence
- Shoots: Left
- ELH team (P) Cur. team Former teams: HC Litvínov; BK Mladá Boleslav (ELH); HC Plzeň; Hartford Wolf Pack; Peoria Rivermen; HC Bílí Tygři Liberec; HC Slavia Praha; HC Vítkovice; Piráti Chomutov; Motor České Budějovice
- NHL draft: Undrafted
- Playing career: 2005–present

David Štich (born 15 April 1989 in Plzeň) is a Czech professional ice hockey defenceman who currently plays with Banes Motor České Budějovice in the Czech Extraliga (ELH).

Štich previously played for HC Lasselsberger Plzeň, HC Berounští Medvědi, Saint John Sea Dogs, Montreal Juniors, HC Benátky nad Jizerou Bílí Tygři Liberec and HC Slavia Praha, HC Vítkovice, BK Mladá Boleslav, HC Kladno and Piráti Chomutov.
