= Jonathan Huberdeau =

Canadian ice hockey player (born 1993)

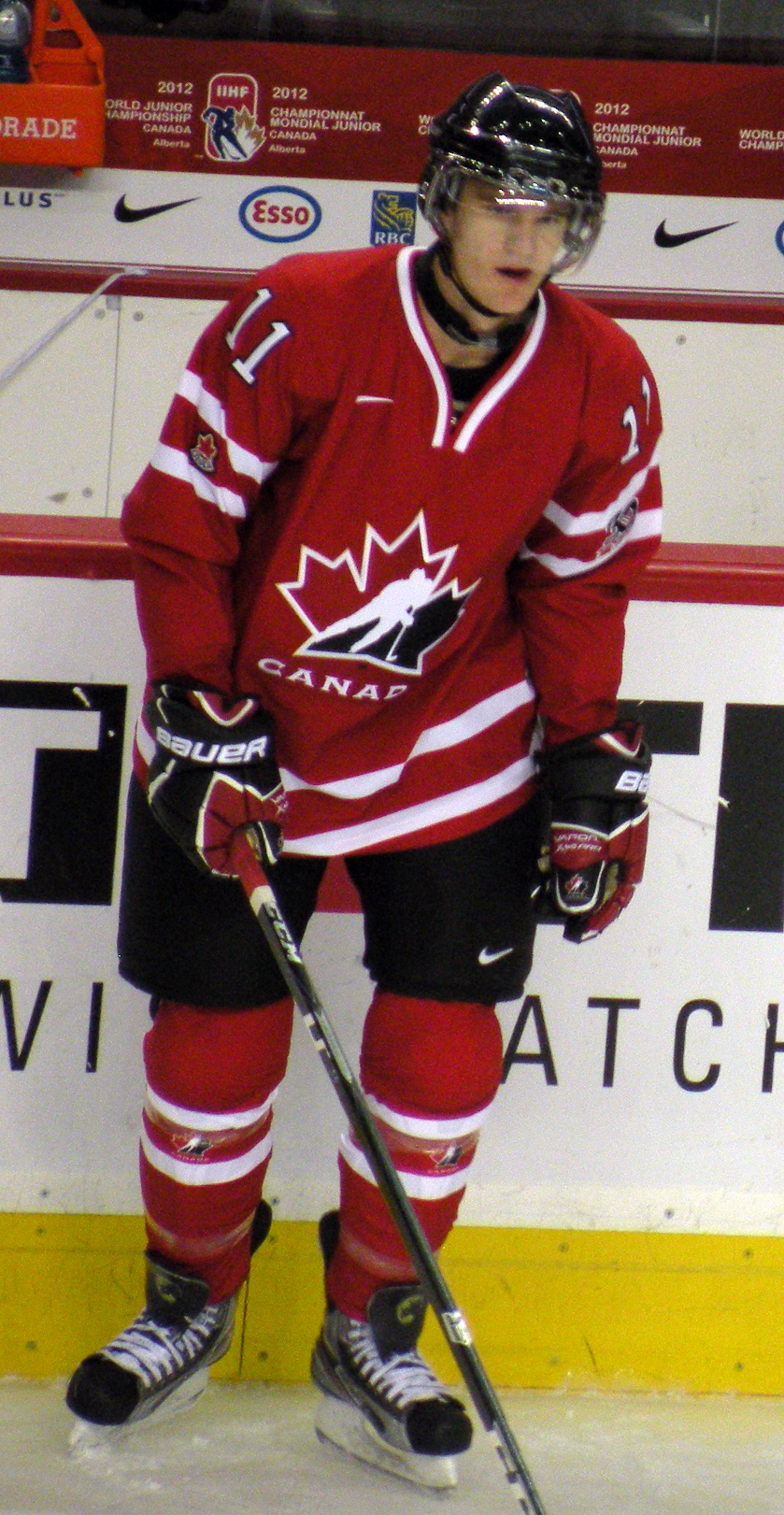
- Huberdeau with Canada during the 2012 World Junior Championships
- Born: June 4, 1993 (age 33) Saint-Jérôme, Quebec, Canada
- Height: 6 ft 1 in (185 cm)
- Weight: 200 lb (91 kg; 14 st 4 lb)
- Position: Winger
- Shoots: Left
- NHL team Former teams: Calgary Flames; Florida Panthers
- National team: Canada
- NHL draft: 3rd overall, 2011; Florida Panthers
- Playing career: 2013–present

Jonathan Huberdeau (born June 4, 1993) is a Canadian professional ice hockey player who is a winger and alternate captain for the Calgary Flames of the National Hockey League (NHL). Huberdeau was selected third overall by the Florida Panthers in the 2011 NHL entry draft and made his NHL debut with the team in 2013. After playing with the Panthers for ten seasons and setting the franchise record for points scored in a single season, Huberdeau was included in a blockbuster trade with the Flames which sent Matthew Tkachuk to Florida.

== Early life ==
Huberdeau was born and raised in Saint-Jérôme, Quebec, to Alain and Josee Huberdeau. Huberdeau's first language is French, but he chose to attend an anglophone high school to better prepare himself for the NHL. Since the Huberdeau family took their RV to Florida each winter, Jonathan attended more Florida Panthers than Montreal Canadiens games in his youth.

== Playing career ==
=== Junior ===
Huberdeau played Midget AAA hockey with the Ste. Eustache Vikings of the Quebec Midget League. He led the league in scoring during the 2008–09 season. After his performance, he was drafted in the first round, 18th overall, in the 2009 Quebec Major Junior Hockey League (QMJHL) Midget draft by the Saint John Sea Dogs. He scored a goal in his first QMJHL game, against the Acadie–Bathurst Titan. Huberdeau was the leading scorer among 16-year-olds in the QMJHL for the 2009–10 season, and scored on all six of his shootout attempts. In January 2010, he was named the QMJHL's scholastic player of the month. The Sea Dogs reached the QMJHL finals during Huberdeau's rookie season.

Prior to the start of the 2010–11 season, Huberdeau was 1 of 33 prospects selected to attend the NHL Research, Development and Orientation Camp in August. The prospects were invited to participate to try out potential rule changes the NHL was considering, and also to be briefed with information on security and professionalism to assist with their future careers in the public eye.

Huberdeau was considered a solid prospect for the 2011 NHL entry draft at the start of the 2010–11 QMJHL season, and his strong play helped him move up the rankings. He scored 43 goals and added 62 assists in 67 games for the Sea Dogs. At the end of the 2010–11 season, NHL Central Scouting ranked him third among North American skaters, moving up one spot from the mid-season rankings. Ahead of the NHL draft, Russian-based club Vityaz Chekhov made Huberdeau the fifth overall selection in the 2011 KHL Junior Draft. After being informed of his selection, Huberdeau said, "For sure, I don't want to go there. I didn't talk to anybody about that."

The Sea Dogs captured the 2011 QMJHL championship and represented the league at the 2011 Memorial Cup. At the Memorial Cup tournament, the Sea Dogs earned a bye to the final game after victories in their first two round-robin games. In the final against the Mississauga St. Michael's Majors, Huberdeau recorded a goal and an assist, helping the Sea Dogs to a 3–1 victory. He was awarded the Stafford Smythe Memorial Trophy as the tournament's Most Valuable Player, and was named to the tournament's All-Star Team.

Huberdeau was nominated for three QMJHL awards at the end of the season, including the Michel Brière Memorial Trophy for Most Valuable Player, the Mike Bossy Trophy as top professional prospect and the Paul Dumont Trophy as the QMJHL's personality of the year. He did not win any of the awards – Sean Couturier was named MVP and top prospect, while Louis Leblanc captured the award for personality of the year. Huberdeau was named to the league's First All-Star Team.

=== Professional ===
==== Florida Panthers (2013–2022) ====
On September 20, 2011, playing in his second NHL pre-season game for the Florida Panthers, Huberdeau scored a goal against the Nashville Predators. He played five pre-season games with the Panthers, tallying three goals and one assist to lead the team in pre-season scoring before being sent back to Saint John on October 3.

Following the conclusion of the 2012–13 NHL lockout, Huberdeau made the Panthers starting roster for the 2012–13 season. He scored his first NHL goal on January 19, 2013, against Cam Ward of the Carolina Hurricanes on the second shift and first shot of his NHL career. Huberdeau would add two assists in the 5–1 victory to earn the first star of the game in his NHL debut. NHL regulations allowed the Panthers to keep Huberdeau in their lineup for a maximum of five games before they could either return him to his junior team or keep him in Florida. On January 28, 2013, after registering a goal and two assists in five games, the Panthers announced Huberdeau would remain with the Panthers for the remainder of the NHL season. As a result of his outstanding rookie season, Huberdeau won the 2013 Calder Memorial Trophy.

In the 2014–15 season, Huberdeau scored a career-high 15 goals and 39 assists (54 points) in 77 games played. After Florida's late-season acquisition of forward Jaromír Jágr from the New Jersey Devils, who was placed on Florida's top line alongside Huberdeau and Aleksander Barkov, Huberdeau recorded 6 goals and 15 assists (21 points) in 20 games played to finish the season. Huberdeau's assists total (39) was the most for a Panther since Stephen Weiss in 2008–09. At the conclusion of the season, Huberdeau was set to become a restricted free agent.

On September 6, 2016, the Panthers signed Huberdeau to a six-year, $35.4 million contract averaging $5.9 million per season. Panthers president of hockey operations Dale Tallon spoke very highly of Huberdeau after the signing, saying, "Jonathan is a highly talented and dynamic player who is another important piece of our team's young core. In each of his last two seasons, he has posted over 50 points and has developed into a key component of our team's offense."

On November 16, 2019, Huberdeau surpassed Stephen Weiss to become the all-time leader for the Florida Panthers in assists.

On April 1, 2022, Huberdeau picked up his 71st assist in the Panthers' 4–0 win over the Chicago Blackhawks. In doing so, he surpassed Joé Juneau's previous NHL record (70) for most assists in a single season by a left-winger.

On April 5, 2022, Huberdeau became the first Panthers player to reach 100 points in a season in the Panthers' 7–6 comeback win against the Toronto Maple Leafs, with Huberdeau scoring the overtime goal.

==== Calgary Flames (2022–present) ====
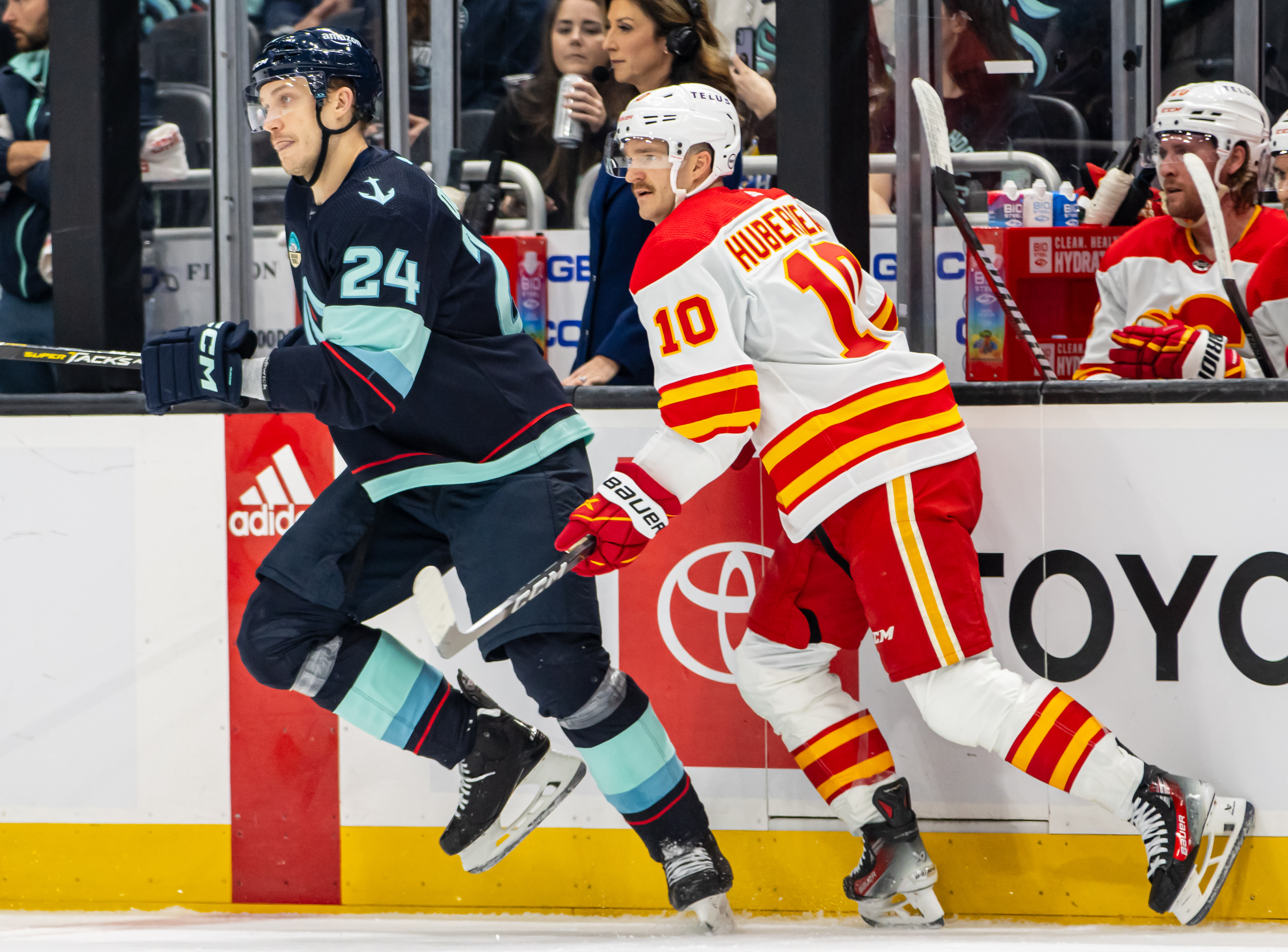
Huberdeau (right) and Jamie Oleksiak (left) of the Seattle Kraken in 2023.

On July 22, 2022, Huberdeau, along with MacKenzie Weegar, Cole Schwindt, and a 2025 conditional first-round draft pick (Cullen Potter), were traded to the Calgary Flames for Matthew Tkachuk and a conditional fourth-round draft pick (Mads Kongsbak Klyvo). On August 3, Huberdeau signed an eight-year, $84 million contract extension with the Flames, carrying an average annual value of $10.5 million. It was the largest contract in Flames' franchise history, surpassing Sean Monahan's $44.625 million contract signed in 2016.

Huberdeau's point production during the 2022–23 season took a significant dip from his previous season with the Florida Panthers, setting an NHL record for the biggest point drop off in NHL history between seasons; falling from 115 points in 2021–22, to 55 points the next season – his lowest points production for a full season since 2014–15. (Note: Huberdeau missed more than half of the 2016–17 season, scoring just 26 points.) His output continued its decline, to 52 points, in the 2023–24 season – the second lowest points per game (ppg) production rate of his 12 year NHL career. (Note: Only 2013–14 was lower points per game for Huberdeau.) In the 2024–25 season, Huberdeau's output increased to 62 points.

On February 5, 2026, the Flames announced that Huberdeau needed hip surgery and would miss the remainder of the 2025–26 season. Through 50 games played, he had 10 goals and 15 assists.

== International play ==
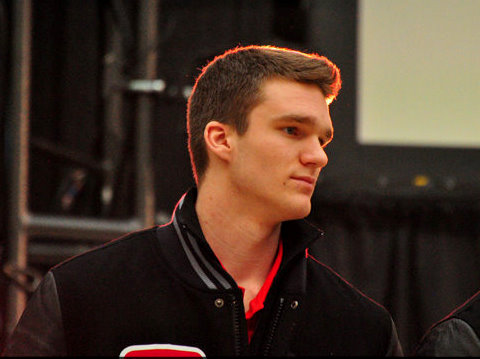
- Huberdeau at a press conference during the 2012 World Junior Championships

Medal record

Men's ice hockey

Representing Canada

World Junior Championships
Bronze medal – third place	2012 Canada	

Huberdeau's first experience with Hockey Canada came when he represented Team Quebec at the 2010 World U-17 Hockey Challenge. He scored two goals and added a single assist in five games. He represented Canada at the 2010 Ivan Hlinka Memorial Tournament, recording three assists as Canada captured the gold medal.

Huberdeau continued his international success by representing Canada at the 2012 World Junior Championships. He scored one goal and four assists in Canada's 8–1 victory over Finland to open the tournament.

== Personal life ==
Huberdeau is an ambassador for the Fondation Cité de la Santé, which benefits the Cité de la Santé hospital where he was born. He hosts an annual golf tournament to raise money for the foundation. He has also participated in charity golf tournaments for the Sea Dogs, to raise money for scholarships for Sea Dogs players who transition into careers outside of hockey.

In March 2020, Huberdeau donated memorabilia to Athletes for COVID-19 Relief to raise funds for the Center for Disaster Philanthropy's COVID-19 Response Fund. In 2022, he pledged to donate his brain to Project Enlist Canada for research on brain injuries, alongside numerous other athletes and armed forces members.

Huberdeau and his partner Catherine Deslongchamps welcomed their first child, a son named Jacob, in June 2025.

== Career statistics ==
=== Regular season and playoffs ===
Bold indicates led league

			Regular season					Playoffs
Season	Team	League	GP	G	A	Pts	PIM	GP	G	A	Pts	PIM
2009–10	Saint John Sea Dogs	QMJHL	61	15	20	35	43	21	11	7	18	22
2010–11	Saint John Sea Dogs	QMJHL	67	43	62	105	88	19	16	14	30	16
2011–12	Saint John Sea Dogs	QMJHL	37	30	42	72	50	15	10	11	21	18
2012–13	Saint John Sea Dogs	QMJHL	30	16	29	45	48	—	—	—	—	—
2012–13	Florida Panthers	NHL	48	14	17	31	18	—	—	—	—	—
2013–14	Florida Panthers	NHL	69	9	19	28	37	—	—	—	—	—
2014–15	Florida Panthers	NHL	79	15	39	54	38	—	—	—	—	—
2015–16	Florida Panthers	NHL	76	20	39	59	43	6	1	2	3	10
2016–17	Florida Panthers	NHL	31	10	16	26	13	—	—	—	—	—
2017–18	Florida Panthers	NHL	82	27	42	69	32	—	—	—	—	—
2018–19	Florida Panthers	NHL	82	30	62	92	40	—	—	—	—	—
2019–20	Florida Panthers	NHL	69	23	55	78	30	4	1	2	3	2
2020–21	Florida Panthers	NHL	55	20	41	61	36	6	2	8	10	4
2021–22	Florida Panthers	NHL	80	30	**85**	115	54	10	1	4	5	4
2022–23	Calgary Flames	NHL	79	15	40	55	36	—	—	—	—	—
2023–24	Calgary Flames	NHL	81	12	40	52	49	—	—	—	—	—
2024–25	Calgary Flames	NHL	81	28	34	62	34	—	—	—	—	—
2025–26	Calgary Flames	NHL	50	10	15	25	41	—	—	—	—	—
NHL totals			962	263	544	807	501	26	5	16	21	20

=== International ===
Year	Team	Event	Result	GP	G	A	Pts	PIM
2008	Canada	U17	7th	5	2	1	3	4
2012	Canada	WJC	3rd place, bronze medalist(s)	6	1	8	9	16
2013	Canada	WJC	4th	6	3	6	9	4
2014	Canada	WC	5th	8	1	4	5	2
Junior totals				17	6	15	21	24
Senior totals				8	1	4	5	2

== Awards and honours ==
Award	Year	Ref
CHL / QMJHL
First Team All-Star	2011	
CHL Memorial Cup All-Star Team	2011	
NHL
Calder Memorial Trophy	2013	
NHL All-Rookie Team	2013	
NHL All-Star Game	2020, 2022	
NHL Second All-Star Team	2021, 2022	
Calgary Flames
Ralph T. Scurfield Humanitarian Award	2023	
J. R. "Bud" McCaig Award	2024	

== Notes ==
Awards and achievements
Preceded by Gabriel Landeskog	Winner of the Calder Trophy; 2013	Succeeded by Nathan MacKinnon
Preceded by Quinton Howden	Florida Panthers first-round draft pick 2011	Succeeded by Mike Matheson
