= Andrew Shaw (ice hockey) =

Canadian ice hockey player (born 1991)

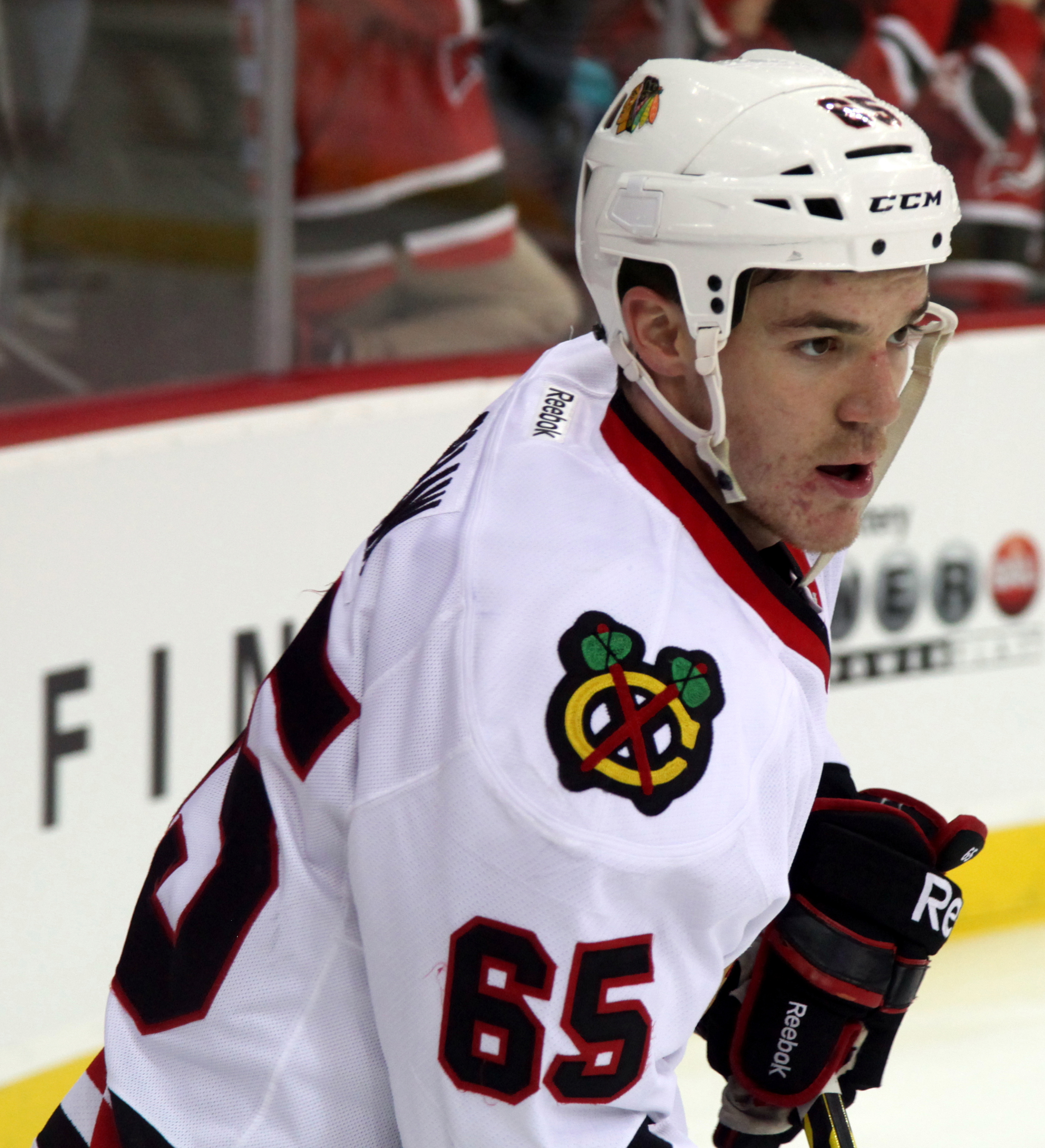
- Shaw with the Chicago Blackhawks in December 2014
- Born: July 20, 1991 (age 35) Belleville, Ontario, Canada
- Height: 5 ft 11 in (180 cm)
- Weight: 182 lb (83 kg; 13 st 0 lb)
- Position: Centre / right wing
- Shot: Right
- Played for: Chicago Blackhawks; Montreal Canadiens
- NHL draft: 139th overall, 2011; Chicago Blackhawks
- Playing career: 2011–2021

Andrew Shaw (born July 20, 1991) is a Canadian former professional ice hockey player. He was selected in the fifth round, 139th overall, by the Chicago Blackhawks of the National Hockey League (NHL) in the 2011 NHL entry draft and is a two-time Stanley Cup champion with the Blackhawks (2013 and 2015). Shaw also played for the Montreal Canadiens prior to the end of his career in 2021 due to suffering multiple concussions.

== Early life ==
Shaw grew up in Belleville, Ontario. He has three siblings. When he was growing up, many, including his own family, believed his younger brother had a better chance of making the NHL.

== Playing career ==
=== Junior ===
==== Niagara IceDogs ====
Shaw made his OHL debut with the Niagara IceDogs in a September 20, 2008 game against the Ottawa 67's. He scored his first OHL goal in a game against the Plymouth Whalers. On November 14, Shaw had his first assist in a game against the Kitchener Rangers at the Kitchener Memorial Auditorium Complex. Shaw had 17 points (eight goals and nine assists) overall in his OHL rookie season and ranked second on his team with 97 penalty minutes (PIM) in 56 regular-season games.

On October 17, 2009 in a game against the Sudbury Wolves, Shaw gained a goal and two assists making it his first career multi-point game. In a January 2, 2010 game at Sudbury he had his first career multi-goal game. Shaw had 11 goals and 25 assists in 68 regular-season tilts. He ranked fifth on the team with 36 points and paced the team with 129 PIM, recording 4 PIM in five postseason appearances.

==== Owen Sound Attack ====
Shaw had a season-best four assists in a September 15, 2010 game against the Guelph Storm. From October 14 to October 23, he had a point in six straight games, with two goals and six assists, and Shaw had points (four goals and two assists) in four straight games during the OHL playoffs. He also had three multi-goal games in 20 OHL postseason games in 2011. After the end of the season Shaw was honoured as the OHL's Hardest Working Player of the Year.

During the 2010-11 season, Shaw led Owen Sound with 135 penalty minutes and ranked fifth on the team with a junior career-high 54 points. This season gave him junior career highs, with 54 points, 22 goals, 32 assists, 135 penalty minutes in 66 regular-season games. He registered a junior-career best +17 plus/minus rating, led his team with 135 PIM, ranked third on his team with 10 goals and fourth with 17 points (10 goals and 7 assists) in 20 postseason appearances. Shaw paced the attack with 53 PIM on the way to the OHL Championship, paced all skaters at the 2011 Memorial Cup with seven points (2 goals and 5 assist) in four games.

=== Professional (2011–2021) ===
==== Chicago Blackhawks ====
Despite missing two consecutive drafts, Shaw was selected by the Chicago Blackhawks in the 5th round (139th overall) of the 2011 NHL entry draft. Shaw split time between the Chicago Blackhawks and their AHL associate the Rockford IceHogs in the 2011–12 season, playing 38 games for the IceHogs and 37 games for the Blackhawks and recording 12 goals, 11 assists and 23 points for both clubs. Shaw made his professional debut in an October 8, 2011 game against the Grand Rapids Griffins. In Rockford's 5–3 win against the Peoria Rivermen on October 9 at Carver Arena Shaw made an assist on the game-winning goal, his first professional career point. In Rockford's 6–4 win against the Peoria Rivermen on October 28 at Carver Arena he scored the first goal of his professional career. Shaw had both the first multi-point game (one goal and two assists) and first shorthanded goal of his professional career in Rockford's 7–3 win over the Peoria Rivermen on November 25. In Rockford's 6–3 at-home victory over the Chicago Wolves on December 9, Shaw had the first multi-goal game of his professional career and he was named the #1 Star of the game. Shaw scored two goals in Rockford's 5–4 shootout loss to Grand Rapids Griffins on December 14 at Van Andel Arena. For the month of December, Shaw totalled nine points: eight goals and one assist.

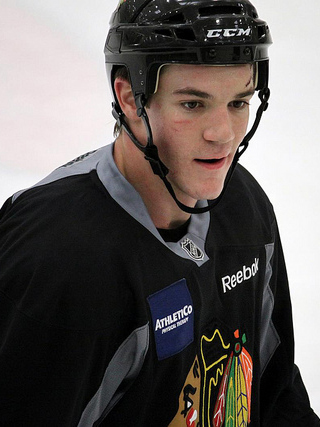
Shaw practicing in January 2012 with the Chicago Blackhawks

On January 3, 2012, Shaw signed a three-year entry-level contract and was recalled the following day by Chicago to replace injured agitator Daniel Carcillo, his first career NHL recall. On January 5, Shaw made his NHL debut in a game against the Philadelphia Flyers, getting into a fight, with Flyers rookie Zac Rinaldo, on the second shift, the first fight of his NHL career. He needed stitches, but later returned to score the first goal of his NHL career on his first shot of his first game against Ilya Bryzgalov and played on the Blackhawks first line with Patrick Sharp and captain Jonathan Toews. On January 18, Shaw recorded his first career assist on a goal by Jonathan Toews in a game against the Buffalo Sabres. Between January 12 through January 18 Shaw had a goal in four straight games. Shaw would continue the remainder of the season for the Blackhawks contributing to either the fourth line with Jamal Mayers and John Scott or the third line with Bryan Bickell and Dave Bolland. Shaw missed three postseason tilts (April 17–21) in the Blackhawks first round exit to the Phoenix Coyotes due to a suspension from an illegal hit to Coyotes goaltender Mike Smith in game two. He would return to the Blackhawks lineup for game six but the Blackhawks would lose the game 4–0 to lose the series 4–2. Shaw would finish the 2012 playoffs pointless in three games.

During the lock-out, Shaw played for the IceHogs. He served a six-game suspension after leaving the bench to join a fight in a game against the Lake Erie Monsters on November 3, 2012. Four games after serving that suspension, Shaw received a one-game suspension for a boarding incident in a game against the Chicago Wolves on November 28. Shaw scored a goal in each of the four games between these two suspensions. Shaw had a goal and an assist in a 4–3 shootout win over the Lake Erie Monsters. Shaw returned to the Blackhawks when the abbreviated NHL season started in January 2013. He played in all 48 regular season games with nine goals, six assists and 15 points recorded as the Blackhawks won the Presidents' Trophy as the regular season champions and advanced to the Stanley Cup playoffs and, eventually, the Stanley Cup Final. On June 12, 2013, Shaw had the game-winning tip-in of the opening game of the Finals to give the Blackhawks a 4–3 triple-overtime victory over the Boston Bruins. Minutes into the first period of the sixth (and final) game of the Finals on June 24, Shaw took a puck off Shawn Thornton's shot to the face. He fell to the ice and laid in a small pool of blood. Officials stopped the play and Shaw was helped to his feet by teammates Nick Leddy and Michal Rozsíval and repaired in the dressing room by the trainers. Shaw returned in the second period and hoisted the Stanley Cup with his wounds still partially bleeding. After the playoffs ended, Shaw revealed that he had a broken rib while playing in the Stanley Cup Final that was originally sustained in the second round against the Detroit Red Wings and sustained a broken orbital bone as a result from getting hit in the face by the puck in game six of the finals. Shaw played all 23 playoff games and scored nine points (five goals, four assists) and continuing on the third line role with Brandon Saad and Viktor Stålberg.

In the 2013–14 season, Shaw had a breakout season as he hit the 20-goal mark for the first time, ending the season with 80 games played and 20 goals, 19 assists and 39 points recorded.

He finished the 2014–15 season playing in 79 games with 15 goals, 11 assists and 26 points recorded. He was also the team leader in penalty minutes with 67. On May 19, in the second overtime of game two of the Western Conference Final against the top seeded Anaheim Ducks, Shaw deliberately headbutted the puck into the Ducks' net. The goal was waved off by the game's referees, but the Blackhawks eventually won the game after Marcus Krüger scored with 3:48 remaining in the third overtime period. Shaw and the Blackhawks eventually erased a 3–2 series deficit and defeated the Ducks in round three in seven games and then the Tampa Bay Lightning in the 2015 Stanley Cup Final in six games, giving Shaw his second Stanley Cup. He ended the 2015 playoffs with five goals and seven assists for 12 points in all 23 contests played.

Shaw finished the 2015–16 season playing in 78 games with 14 goals, 20 assists and 34 points and was again the team leader in penalty minutes with 69. On April 19, 2016, Shaw recorded one goal and two assists both coming on goals by Duncan Keith in game four in the first round of the 2016 playoffs against the St. Louis Blues. Later in the same game, he shouted a homophobic slur towards a referee who had penalized him for interference against Blues defenseman Jay Bouwmeester and also instigated a brawl after the final horn. Shaw apologized for the remarks the next day during a press conference at O'Hare International Airport moments before the Blackhawks boarded their flight to St. Louis for game five. The NHL suspended Shaw for one game and fined him $5,000. After missing game five due to the suspension, Shaw came back to the Blackhawks lineup in game six and recording a goal where the Blackhawks would win 6–3 to help force a game seven which the Blackhawks where he would add another goal but the Blackhawks would lose the game 3–2 and the series 4–3 resulting in their elimination from the 2016 playoffs. Shaw finished the playoffs with four goals and two assists for six points in six games.

==== Montreal Canadiens ====
On June 24, 2016, Shaw was traded to the Montreal Canadiens during the 2016 NHL entry draft in exchange for two 2016 second-round picks. Three days later on June 27, Shaw came to a six-year contract agreement with the Canadiens worth $23.4 million. The NHL suspended Shaw for three games for boarding Connor Hobbs during a preseason game played on September 26. Shaw scored his first goal with the Canadiens on October 13. Controversy ensued Shaw again when he slew footed Johan Larsson of the Buffalo Sabres at the end of the same game. The incident occurred towards the end of the game while the Canadiens had a 4–1 lead over the Sabres. Shaw was assessed a match-penalty, but did not receive any supplemental discipline after meeting with the Department of Player Safety. On December 12, Shaw sustained a concussion after being upended on a hit by Boston Bruins defenseman Torey Krug, causing him to miss 14 games. He then finished the 2016–17 season with 12 goals, 17 assists and 29 points recorded in 68 games played. He also led the team in penalty minutes with 110. Shaw also played in five games in the Canadiens first round exit in the 2017 playoffs in six games to the New York Rangers.

On March 13, 2018, Shaw checked Dallas Stars defenseman Greg Pateryn but was injured himself on the play. He suffered a torn lateral collateral ligament and a concussion. As a result, Shaw underwent knee surgery and was expected to miss around six months to recover. He finished the injury-marred season with 51 games played with 10 goals, 10 assists and 20 points and the Canadiens struggled heavily as a team and with injuries throughout the season resulting in them missing the playoffs by 26 points in the standings.

Although Shaw missed the Canadiens training camp, he was cleared to play in time for the start of the 2018–19 season and had a resurgent season filled with milestones while playing most of the season on Montreal’s second line with off-season acquisitions Max Domi and Tomáš Tatar. On November 24, 2018, Shaw recorded his 100th NHL assist on a goal by Tomáš Tatar in a 3–2 loss to the Boston Bruins. On December 6, Shaw scored his 100th NHL goal in a 5–2 win over the Ottawa Senators against Senators goaltender Craig Anderson. Shaw suffered a neck injury on December 31, in a game against the Dallas Stars which kept him out of the lineup for 15 games. After missing all of January and the first four games in February, he returned to the Montreal lineup on February 9, 2019, a 4–3 OT loss against the Toronto Maple Leafs. On February 26, Shaw scored his first career hat trick in an 8–1 win over the Detroit Red Wings. On March 28, Shaw played his 500th NHL game in a 6–2 loss to the Columbus Blue Jackets. Shaw finished his bounce-back season with 63 games played with 19 goals, a career high 28 assists and career high 47 points recorded and the Canadiens as a team had a revamped season having come just two points out of a playoff spot. As a result of his rejuvenation, Shaw was nominated by the Canadiens for the Bill Masterton Memorial Trophy, the award that goes to the player that "best exemplifies the qualities of perseverance, sportsmanship and dedication to hockey" but was not named a top three finalist by the league.

==== Return to Chicago ====
On June 30, 2019, the Canadiens traded Shaw (alongside a 2021 seventh-round pick) back to the Blackhawks in exchange for 2020 second and seventh-round picks and a 2021 third-round pick. On November 30, Shaw suffered a concussion during a game against the Colorado Avalanche and was immediately placed on injured reserve. This injury effectively ended his season after the first 26 games of the 2019–20 season when the team announced he would not return. On July 14, 2020, Shaw opted out of playing the remainder of the season (which saw the regular season end three weeks early and the playoffs postponed to the summer with an expanded format due to the COVID-19 pandemic), citing a preference to continue healing from the concussion.

On February 9, 2021, 14 games into the pandemic-shortened 2020–21 season, Shaw suffered another concussion in a game against the Dallas Stars, causing him to miss the remainder of the season. On April 26, towards the end of the season, Shaw announced his retirement effective immediately after being advised by the team doctors to discontinue his playing career due to multiple concussions within short time spans. Shaw was nominated for the Bill Masterton Memorial Trophy after the season ended by the Blackhawks making it the second time in his career where Shaw has been nominated for the trophy but wasn't named a top three finalist by the NHL.

== Playing style ==
Shaw developed a reputation as an agitator for his aggressive play and verbal instigation while playing for the Chicago Blackhawks. He compared his playing style to Boston Bruins player Brad Marchand, whom he fought in the third game of the 2013 Stanley Cup Final, by saying "We're both agitators. We both play physical and we're always chirping." Joel Quenneville, who coached Shaw in Chicago from 2011 to 2016, praised Shaw by stating, "You're not going to find the same ingredient that [Shaw] provides, whether it's the game-to-game consistency of being an agitator, net-front presence on your power play, good in the room, good on the bench, good on the ice, smart hockey player, makes plays, brings that nastiness you appreciate and comes ready to play every game." Shaw has also gained the nickname "Mutt" from some of his teammates and fans regarding his rough style of play.

Shaw also performs an intricate warm-up ritual which he has practiced before every period since 2009. As part of his routine, Shaw strikes his shin pads approximately seven times with his hockey stick, practices fore and back-hand face-off draws, twirls his hockey stick in his hands, plants the knob-end of his stick onto the ground, and then walks in a circle around it.

== Personal life ==
Shaw is known for wearing a black rubber bracelet with 'Ironworkers Local 721', the name of a local union in Belleville, on the back in tribute to ironworkers from his hometown and as a reminder of his roots. In July 2013, he brought the Stanley Cup back to his hometown for his day with the cup. In August 2013, Shaw auctioned the stitches from his facial injury—made famous as "the definitive image of the NHL playoffs"—for $6,500 and donated the money to The V Foundation for Cancer Research.

Shaw and his wife have two children. Shaw was diagnosed with attention deficit disorder in 2016.

In May 2023, on the Raw Knuckles Podcast with Chris Nilan and Tim Stapleton, Shaw discussed the alleged sexual assault of Kyle Beach, which happened during the Blackhawks' 2009–10 season. On the podcast, Shaw said that the issue "should have nothing to do with the players and the coaching staff", but instead should have been handled by the team's management and HR. He also said, "As a 20 year old, I would've never put myself in the situation Kyle was in. [...] Obviously, I don't know what was going on with Kyle, but he put himself in a bad situation." He received criticism for his comments, particularly for victim blaming.

== Career statistics ==
			Regular season					Playoffs
Season	Team	League	GP	G	A	Pts	PIM	GP	G	A	Pts	PIM
2008–09	Niagara IceDogs	OHL	56	8	9	17	97	12	2	1	3	22
2009–10	Niagara IceDogs	OHL	68	11	25	36	129	5	0	0	0	4
2010–11	Owen Sound Attack	OHL	66	22	32	54	135	20	10	7	17	53
2011–12	Rockford IceHogs	AHL	38	12	11	23	99	—	—	—	—	—
2011–12	Chicago Blackhawks	NHL	37	12	11	23	50	3	0	0	0	15
2012–13	Rockford IceHogs	AHL	28	8	6	14	84	—	—	—	—	—
2012–13	Chicago Blackhawks	NHL	48	9	6	15	38	23	5	4	9	35
2013–14	Chicago Blackhawks	NHL	80	20	19	39	76	12	2	6	8	12
2014–15	Chicago Blackhawks	NHL	79	15	11	26	67	23	5	7	12	36
2015–16	Chicago Blackhawks	NHL	78	14	20	34	69	6	4	2	6	18
2016–17	Montreal Canadiens	NHL	68	12	17	29	110	5	0	0	0	7
2017–18	Montreal Canadiens	NHL	51	10	10	20	53	—	—	—	—	—
2018–19	Montreal Canadiens	NHL	63	19	28	47	71	—	—	—	—	—
2019–20	Chicago Blackhawks	NHL	26	3	7	10	33	—	—	—	—	—
2020–21	Chicago Blackhawks	NHL	14	2	2	4	6	—	—	—	—	—
NHL totals			544	116	131	247	573	72	16	19	35	123

== Awards and honours ==
Award	Year	Ref
CHL
Memorial Cup All-Star Team	2011	
NHL
Stanley Cup champion	2013, 2015	
