= Nathan Beaulieu =

Canadian ice hockey player (born 1992)

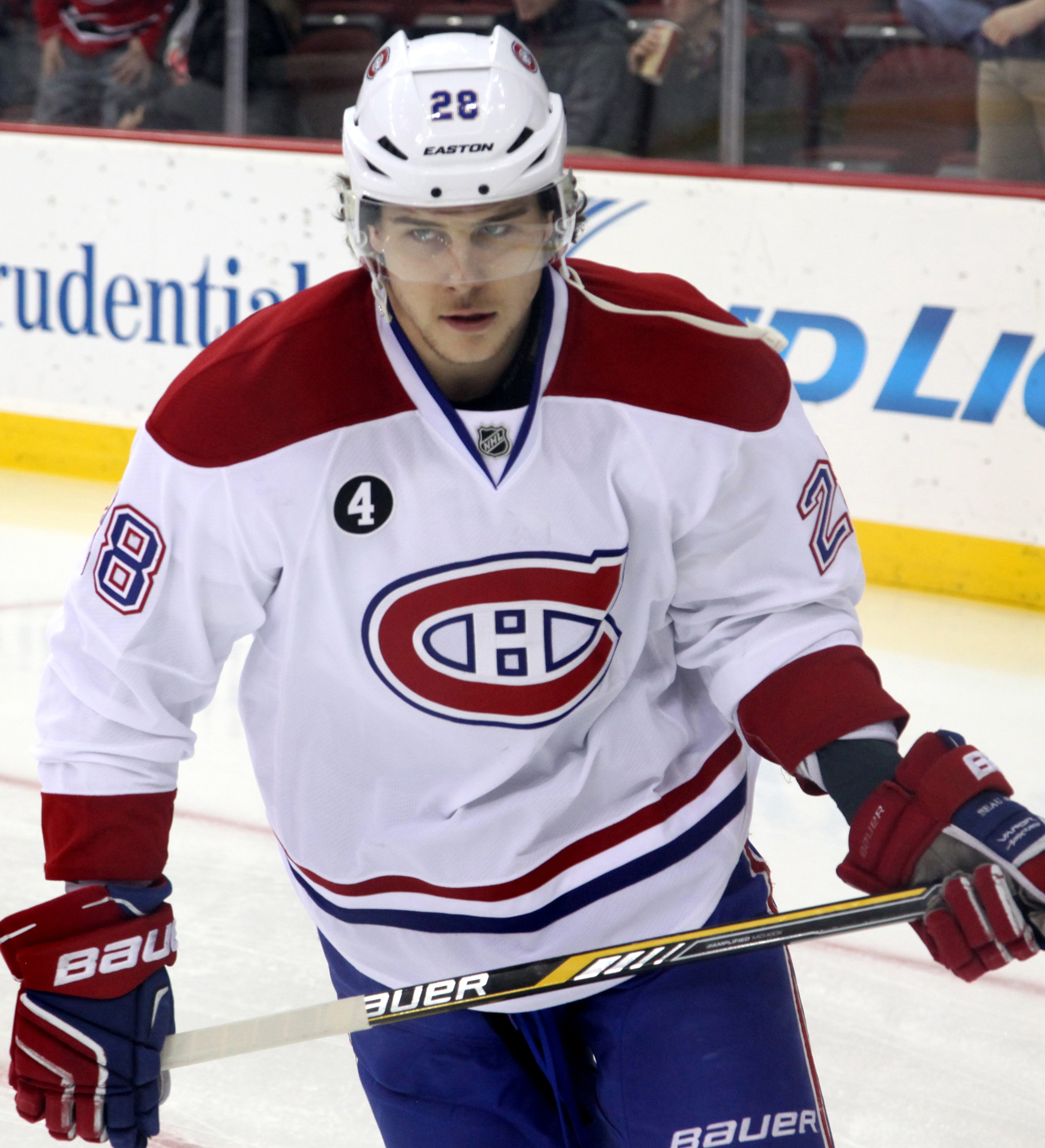
- Beaulieu with the Montreal Canadiens in 2015
- Born: December 5, 1992 (age 33) Strathroy, Ontario, Canada
- Height: 6 ft 2 in (188 cm)
- Weight: 205 lb (93 kg; 14 st 9 lb)
- Position: Defence
- Shot: Left
- Played for: Montreal Canadiens; Buffalo Sabres; Winnipeg Jets; Anaheim Ducks; EHC Kloten; Barys Astana
- NHL draft: 17th overall, 2011; Montreal Canadiens
- Playing career: 2012–2024

Nathan Anthony Richard Beaulieu (born December 5, 1992) is a Canadian former professional ice hockey defenceman. He was selected in the first round, 17th overall, by the Montreal Canadiens in the 2011 NHL entry draft. Beaulieu played in the National Hockey League (NHL) for the Canadiens, Buffalo Sabres, Winnipeg Jets, and Anaheim Ducks.

In junior, Beaulieu helped the Saint John Sea Dogs win the 2011 Memorial Cup, and was named to the tournament's all-star team.

== Playing career ==
=== Junior ===
Beaulieu was drafted by the Saint John Sea Dogs in the fourth round, 68th overall, of the 2008 Quebec Major Junior Hockey League (QMJHL) Midget Draft. When he began his junior career with the Sea Dogs in 2008–09, his father Jacques was the team's head coach. His father was fired by the team and replaced with Gerard Gallant in 2009, an incident which caused Beaulieu to consider leaving the team. He decided to remain with Saint John after speaking with Gallant.

During the 2010–11, Beaulieu established himself as a top prospect for the 2011 NHL entry draft, and was nominated for the Mike Bossy Trophy, awarded to the QMJHL's top professional prospect; he lost the award to Sean Couturier. Beaulieu was ranked fifth among North American skaters by the NHL Central Scouting Bureau in its final rankings, an improvement from his mid-season ranking of ninth. Saint John won the QMJHL championship and moved on to the 2011 Memorial Cup. Beaulieu scored the winning goal in the team's first game of the tournament against hosts Mississauga St. Michael's Majors. The Sea Dogs met the Majors again in the championship game of the tournament and won 3–1 to capture the Memorial Cup. After the tournament, Beaulieu was named to the Memorial Cup All-Star Team. The Sea Dogs win was the second Memorial Cup win for the Beaulieu family, as his father Jacques was an assistant coach with the London Knights when they won in 2005.

=== Professional ===
Beaulieu made his professional debut in the 2012–13 season with the Canadiens' American Hockey League (AHL) affiliate, the Hamilton Bulldogs. He later played his first NHL game with the Canadiens on March 30, 2013, versus the New York Rangers.

In his fifth season with the Canadiens in 2017–18, Beaulieu posted career highs in his second full NHL year, appearing in 74 games with 4 goals and 24 points.

As an impending restricted free agent from the Canadiens, on June 17, 2017, Beaulieu was traded by Montreal to the Buffalo Sabres in exchange for the Sabres' third-round pick in the 2017 NHL entry draft. On July 31, 2017, he was signed to a two-year $4.8 million contract with the Sabres.

During his second season with the Sabres in 2018–19, Beaulieu's role was reduced and was regularly a healthy scratch. Through the mid-point of the season, Beaulieu requested to be traded due to his limited play while in a contract year. He remained with the team featuring in 30 games for 7 points before he was ultimately dealt by the Sabres at the trade deadline to the Winnipeg Jets for a six-round pick in the 2019 NHL entry draft on February 25, 2019.

With Beaulieu approaching arbitration rights as a restricted free agent the Jets declined to tender a qualifying offer, releasing him as a free agent on June 25, 2019. On July 1, 2019, Beaulieu opted to re-sign with the Jets on a cheaper one-year, $1 million contract. Later that season, on February 16, 2020, Beaulieu scored his first goal as a Winnipeg Jet- the game-winner- in a 3–2 home ice victory against the Chicago Blackhawks.

During his fourth year with the Jets, in the 2020–21 season, Beaulieu was traded to the Pittsburgh Penguins in exchange for a conditional 2022 seventh-round draft pick on March 21, 2022.

As a free agent from the Penguins having not featured for the club, Beaulieu went unsigned over the summer. He initially joined the Anaheim Ducks on a professional tryout (PTO) in preparation for the 2022–23 season before agreeing to a one-year, $850,000 contract following a successful training camp on October 1, 2022. In his lone season with the Ducks, Beaulieu added just 4 assists through 52 regular season games from the blueline.

Leaving the Ducks as a free agent, Beaulieu for the second consecutive season was signed to a PTO, accepting an invitation to the Carolina Hurricanes' training camp on August 22, 2023. Despite this, Beaulieu would ultimately sign overseas with EHC Kloten of the Swiss-based National League (NL) for the 2023–24 season.

On June 28, 2024, Beaulieu joined Barys Astana of the Kontinental Hockey League (KHL) on a one-year contract. On October 18 of the same year, following just 8 appearances with Barys, Beaulieu was suddenly released by the club along with fellow North American ex-NHLers Michael McLeod and Will Butcher. Beaulieu was later signed to a contract with Slovak club, HC Nové Zámky of the Tipos Extraliga, however did not feature with the club.

He announced his retirement from professional hockey following 13 professional seasons on July 23, 2025.

== Personal life ==
On April 27, 2013, Beaulieu—along with his father Jacques—were involved in an altercation in their hometown of Strathroy, Ontario. The incident in question took place following a charity golf tournament at a private residence and stemmed from property damages by the Beaulieus. As a result, two people were assaulted and suffered minor injuries. In August 2013, Beaulieu and his father pleaded guilty to assault. Each was assessed penalties of conditional discharges with nine months' probation, a joint recommendation from the Crown and the defence.

== International play ==
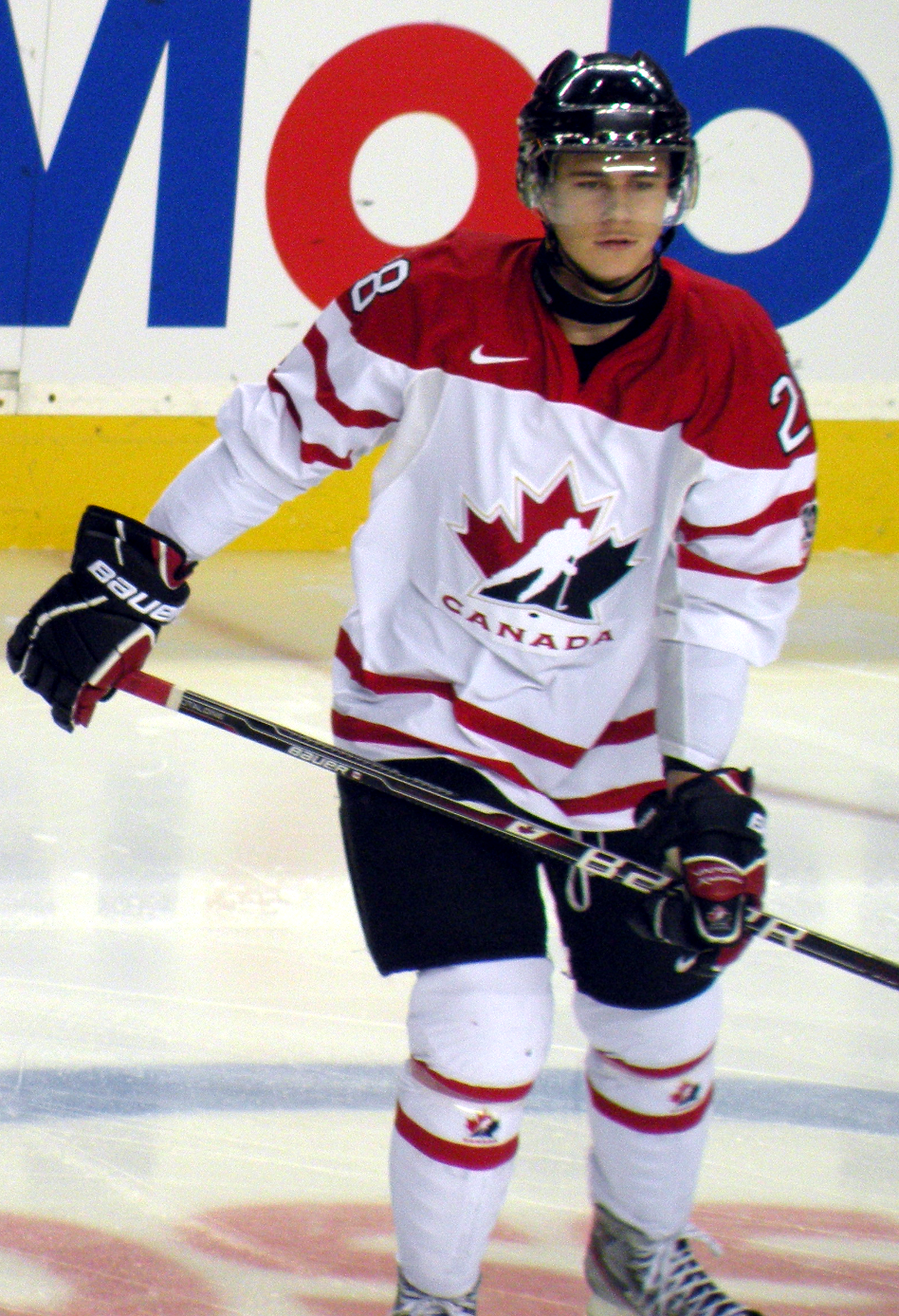
- Beaulieu in January 2012

Medal record

Representing Canada

Ice hockey

World Junior Championships
Bronze medal – third place	2012 Canada	

Beaulieu participated at the 2012 World Junior Ice Hockey Championships held in Canada and won the bronze medal.

== Career statistics ==
=== Regular season and playoffs ===
			Regular season					Playoffs
Season	Team	League	GP	G	A	Pts	PIM	GP	G	A	Pts	PIM
2008–09	Saint John Sea Dogs	QMJHL	49	2	8	10	14	4	0	0	0	2
2009–10	Saint John Sea Dogs	QMJHL	66	12	33	45	40	21	4	12	16	22
2010–11	Saint John Sea Dogs	QMJHL	65	12	33	45	52	19	4	13	17	26
2011–12	Saint John Sea Dogs	QMJHL	53	11	41	52	100	17	4	11	15	32
2012–13	Hamilton Bulldogs	AHL	67	7	24	31	63	—	—	—	—	—
2012–13	Montreal Canadiens	NHL	6	0	2	2	0	—	—	—	—	—
2013–14	Hamilton Bulldogs	AHL	57	7	20	27	33	—	—	—	—	—
2013–14	Montreal Canadiens	NHL	17	0	2	2	8	7	0	2	2	2
2014–15	Montreal Canadiens	NHL	64	1	8	9	45	5	0	1	1	0
2014–15	Hamilton Bulldogs	AHL	8	2	2	4	9	—	—	—	—	—
2015–16	Montreal Canadiens	NHL	64	2	17	19	55	—	—	—	—	—
2016–17	Montreal Canadiens	NHL	74	4	24	28	44	5	0	1	1	0
2017–18	Buffalo Sabres	NHL	59	1	8	9	36	—	—	—	—	—
2018–19	Buffalo Sabres	NHL	30	3	4	7	32	—	—	—	—	—
2018–19	Winnipeg Jets	NHL	18	0	5	5	7	—	—	—	—	—
2019–20	Winnipeg Jets	NHL	38	1	7	8	29	4	0	1	1	7
2020–21	Winnipeg Jets	NHL	25	0	1	1	20	—	—	—	—	—
2021–22	Winnipeg Jets	NHL	24	0	4	4	25	—	—	—	—	—
2022–23	Anaheim Ducks	NHL	52	0	4	4	39	—	—	—	—	—
2022–23	San Diego Gulls	AHL	4	1	0	1	0	—	—	—	—	—
2023–24	EHC Kloten	NL	13	0	2	2	2	—	—	—	—	—
2024–25	Barys Astana	KHL	8	0	1	1	12	—	—	—	—	—
NHL totals			471	12	86	98	340	21	0	5	5	9

=== International ===
Year	Team	Event	Result	GP	G	A	Pts	PIM
2009	Canada Atlantic	U17	9th	5	0	2	2	4
2012	Canada	WJC	3rd place, bronze medalist(s)	6	0	1	1	16
Junior totals				11	0	3	3	20

== Awards and honours ==
Award	Year
QMJHL
President's Cup champion	2011, 2012
Second All-Star Team	2012
CHL
CHL/NHL Top Prospects Game	2011
Memorial Cup champion	2011
Memorial Cup All-Star Team	2011

Awards and achievements
Preceded by Jarred Tinordi	Montreal Canadiens first-round draft pick 2011	Succeeded by Alex Galchenyuk
