= Saint John Sea Dogs =

Junior ice hockey team in Saint John, New Brunswick

- City: Saint John, New Brunswick
- League: Quebec Maritimes Junior Hockey League
- Conference: Eastern
- Division: Maritimes
- Founded: 2005
- Home arena: TD Station
- Colours
- General manager: Trevor Georgie
- Head coach: Jim Hulton
- Website: sjseadogs.com

Championships
- Playoff championships: Memorial Cup Champions; 2011, 2022; QMJHL Champions; 2011, 2012, 2017

Current uniform

The Saint John Sea Dogs are a Canadian junior ice hockey team in the Quebec Maritimes Junior Hockey League (QMJHL) based in Saint John, New Brunswick. Founded as an expansion team in 2005, the Sea Dogs play their home games at TD Station and became the first team from Atlantic Canada to win a Memorial Cup championship in 2011. The Sea Dogs won the 2022 Memorial Cup as the host team, and have three President's Cup championships in franchise history: 2011, 2012, and 2017.

== History ==
Saint John was granted a Quebec Major Junior Hockey League expansion team for the 2005–06 season, and chose a harbour seal for the team's logo. The Sea Dogs' first head coach was Christian La Rue under general manager Bob LeBlanc. The Sea Dogs were also given the first overall pick at the 2005 QMJHL Draft, selecting defenceman Alex Grant. The Sea Dogs did not qualify for the playoffs in their first season of play.

During the offseason, La Rue was replaced with former London Knights assistant coach Jacques Beaulieu. Following the mid-season resignation of Leblanc, Beaulieu assumed the dual role of coach and general manager. The Sea Dogs had another first overall pick at the 2006 QMJHL Draft, where they selected defenceman Yann Sauvé. The team missed the playoffs again in 2007, and selected defenceman Simon Després first overall. The team also selected goaltender Robert Mayer third overall at the 2007 CHL Import Draft.

In 2008, the team signed coach Beaulieu's son Nathan. In the 2008–09 season, the Sea Dogs hosted the second game of the Canada–Russia Series at TD Station. The Russians defeated Team QMJHL by a score of 4–3, with the Canadian roster featuring four Sea Dogs players: Grant, Després, Sauvé, and rookie Steven Anthony (in place of an injured Chris DiDomenico). Later that season, the Sea Dogs fired Beaulieu after a first round playoff loss.

In the 2009 QMJHL Draft, the team chose future NHL forward Jonathan Huberdeau 18th overall. In the 2009 CHL Import Draft, the Sea Dogs chose Russian forward Stanislav Galiev first overall as well as Slovak forward Tomáš Jurčo fourth overall. In the 2009–10 season, the Saint John Sea Dogs won 22 consecutive games beginning on October 17 until December 12. The offense was led by Mike Hoffman (45 points). Following their streak, the Sea Dogs were first place in the league.

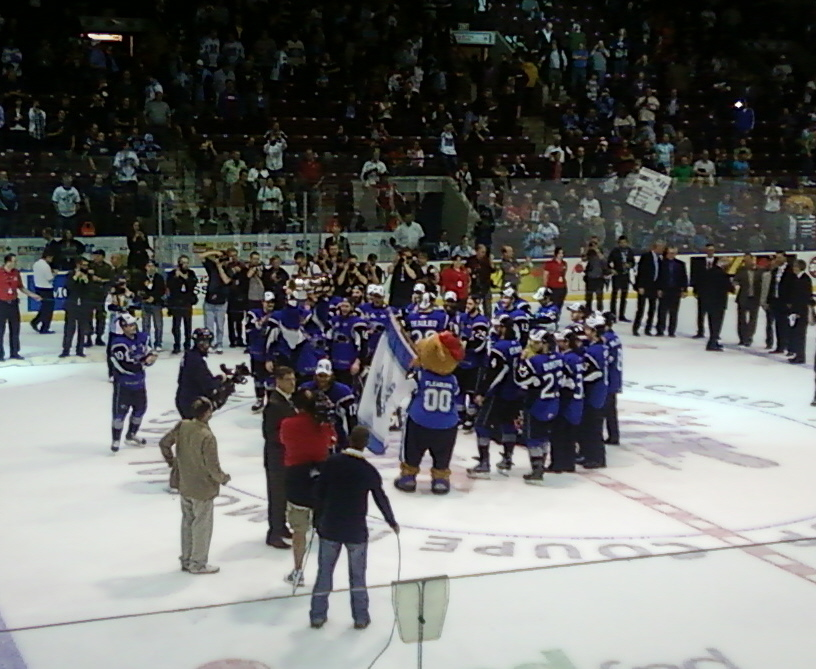
Saint John Sea Dogs celebrate winning the 2011 Memorial Cup championship.

The Sea Dogs tied a QMJHL record for most wins in a season with 58 in 2010–11, and won their first QMJHL President's Cup. In the same season, the Sea Dogs then became the first team from Atlantic Canada to win a Memorial Cup. In 2011, Yann Sauvé became the first player from the Saint John Sea Dogs organization to play an NHL game with his draft team, the Vancouver Canucks.

In 2014, the Sea Dogs were purchased by Scott McCain of McCain Foods. Trevor Georgie was named president of the Sea Dogs, previously working as a senior manager of consulting at Wasserman Media Group. He sought to attract a younger demographic to the games. The Sea Dogs won their second Memorial Cup in 2022.

== Players ==
=== Team captains ===
- 2005–06 – Vincent Lambert / Kevin Coughlin
- 2006–07 – Charles Bergeron / David MacDonald
- 2007–08 – Alex Grant
- 2008–09 – Alex Grant / David Štich
- 2009–11 – Mike Thomas
- 2011–12 – Jonathan Huberdeau
- 2012–13 – Jonathan Huberdeau / Pierre Durepos
- 2013–14 – Sébastien Auger
- 2014–15 – Olivier LeBlanc / Mark Tremaine
- 2015–17 – Spencer Smallman
- 2017–18 – Joe Veleno / Bailey Webster
- 2018–19 – Anthony Boucher / Michael Campoli
- 2019–20 – Nicolas Guay
- 2020–21 – Vacant
- 2021–22 – Vincent Sévigny
- 2022–23 – Charlie DesRoches
- 2023–24 – Peter Reynolds
- 2024–25 – Eriks Mateiko / Nate Tivey
- 2025–26 – Olivier Groulx

=== Sea Dogs Hall of Fame ===
- Jonathan Huberdeau (2009–2013)
- Mike Thomas (2006–2011)
- Gerard Gallant (2009–2012)
- Mike Kelly (2010–2014)
- Thomas Chabot (2013–2017)

=== NHL alumni ===
The following players have played in at least one National Hockey League (NHL) game as of the 2023–24 season:

- Nathan Beaulieu
- Thomas Chabot
- Charlie Coyle
- Simon Després
- Christopher DiDomenico
- William Dufour
- Stanislav Galiev
- Brett Gallant
- Julien Gauthier
- Éric Gélinas
- Alex Grant
- Matthew Highmore
- Mike Hoffman
- Jonathan Huberdeau
- Bokondji Imama
- Mathieu Joseph
- Tomáš Jurčo
- Yan Kuznetsov
- Yann Sauvé
- Joe Veleno
- Jakub Zbořil

=== NHL first round draft picks ===
List of first round selections in the NHL entry draft:

| Year | # | Player | Nationality | NHL team |
|---|---|---|---|---|
| 2009 | 30 | Simon Després (D) | Canada | Pittsburgh Penguins |
| 2011 | 3 | Jonathan Huberdeau (C) | Canada | Florida Panthers |
| 2011 | 17 | Nathan Beaulieu (D) | Canada | Montreal Canadiens |
| 2011 | 28 | Zack Phillips (C) | Canada | Minnesota Wild |
| 2015 | 13 | Jakub Zbořil (D) | Czech Republic | Boston Bruins |
| 2015 | 18 | Thomas Chabot (D) | Canada | Ottawa Senators |

== Season-by-season results ==
=== Regular season ===
QMJHL season standings.
OTL = Overtime loss, SL = Shootout loss

| Season | Division | Games | Won | Lost | OTL | SOL | Points | Pct % | Goals For | Goals Against | Standing | |
| Season | Division | Games | Won | Lost | OTL | SOL | Points | Pct % | Goals For | Goals Against | Division | QMJHL |
|---|---|---|---|---|---|---|---|---|---|---|---|---|
| 2005–06 | East | 70 | 15 | 47 | 2 | 6 | 38 | 0.214 | 174 | 325 | 8th | 17th |
| 2006–07 | East | 70 | 20 | 47 | 1 | 2 | 43 | 0.286 | 209 | 337 | 8th | 18th |
| 2007–08 | East | 70 | 41 | 22 | 4 | 3 | 89 | 0.586 | 265 | 238 | 2nd | 5th |
| 2008–09 | Atlantic | 68 | 34 | 30 | 2 | 2 | 72 | 0.500 | 222 | 232 | 3rd | 9th |
| 2009–10 | Atlantic | 68 | 53 | 12 | 1 | 2 | 109 | 0.779 | 309 | 187 | 1st | 1st |
| 2010–11 | Maritimes | 68 | 58 | 7 | 1 | 2 | 119 | 0.875 | 324 | 165 | 1st | 1st |
| 2011–12 | Maritimes | 68 | 50 | 15 | 0 | 3 | 103 | 0.757 | 298 | 180 | 1st | 1st |
| 2012–13 | Maritimes | 68 | 23 | 44 | 1 | 0 | 47 | 0.346 | 173 | 271 | 5th | 16th |
| 2013–14 | Maritimes | 68 | 19 | 44 | 2 | 3 | 43 | 0.316 | 165 | 255 | 6th | 17th |
| 2014–15 | Maritimes | 68 | 32 | 26 | 4 | 6 | 74 | 0.544 | 237 | 241 | 2nd | 9th |
| 2015–16 | Maritimes | 68 | 42 | 20 | 6 | 0 | 90 | 0.662 | 258 | 222 | 1st | 3rd |
| 2016–17 | Maritimes | 68 | 48 | 14 | 5 | 1 | 102 | 0.750 | 287 | 180 | 1st | 1st |
| 2017–18 | Maritimes | 68 | 14 | 43 | 9 | 2 | 39 | 0.287 | 181 | 301 | 6th | 18th |
| 2018–19 | Maritimes | 68 | 13 | 49 | 2 | 4 | 32 | 0.235 | 169 | 364 | 5th | 17th |
| 2019–20 | Maritimes | 64 | 30 | 33 | 1 | 0 | 61 | 0.477 | 226 | 280 | 4th | 11th |
| 2020–21 | Maritimes | 33 | 15 | 14 | 3 | 1 | 34 | 0.515 | 138 | 136 | 3rd | 11th |
| 2021–22 | Maritimes | 68 | 47 | 17 | 1 | 3 | 98 | 0.721 | 311 | 201 | 2nd | 3rd |
| 2022–23 | Maritimes | 68 | 24 | 38 | 5 | 1 | 54 | 0.397 | 233 | 318 | 5th | 15th |
| 2023–24 | Maritimes | 68 | 20 | 39 | 5 | 4 | 49 | 0.360 | 185 | 293 | 6th | 16th |
| 2024–25 | Maritimes | 64 | 21 | 43 | 0 | 0 | 42 | 0.328 | 154 | 262 | 6th | 17th |
| 2025–26 | Eastern | 64 | 23 | 36 | 5 | 0 | 51 | 0.398 | 216 | 265 | 8th | 14th |

=== Playoffs ===
| Season | 1st round | 2nd round | 3rd round | Finals |
|---|---|---|---|---|
| 2005–06 | Did not qualify | | | |
| 2006–07 | Did not qualify | | | |
| 2007–08 | 4–0 – P.E.I. Rocket | 4–2 – Acadie–Bathurst Titan | 0–4 – Rouyn-Noranda Huskies | Did not advance |
| 2008–09 | 0–4 – Cape Breton Screaming Eagles | Did not advance | | |
| 2009–10 | 4–1 – P.E.I. Rocket | 4–0 – Gatineau Olympiques | 4–2 – Victoriaville Tigres | 2–4 – Moncton Wildcats |
| 2010–11 | 4–0 – Cape Breton Screaming Eagles | 4–1 – Victoriaville Tigres | 4–0 – Lewiston Maineiacs | 4–2 – Gatineau Olympiques |
| 2011–12 | 4–0 – Cape Breton Screaming Eagles | 4–0 – Baie-Comeau Drakkar | 4–1 – Chicoutimi Saguenéens | 4–0 – Rimouski Océanic |
| 2012–13 | 0–4 – Halifax Mooseheads | Did not advance | | |
| 2013–14 | Did not qualify | | | |
| 2014–15 | 1–4 – Baie-Comeau Drakkar | Did not advance | | |
| 2015–16 | 4–1 – Acadie-Bathurst Titan | 4–3 – Cape Breton Screaming Eagles | 1–4 – Shawinigan Cataractes | Did not advance |
| 2016–17 | 4–0 – Rimouski Océanic | 4–0 – Val-d'Or Foreurs | 4–2 – Chicoutimi Saguenéens | 4–0 – Blainville-Boisbriand Armada |
| 2017–18 | Did not qualify | | | |
| 2018–19 | Did not qualify | | | |
| 2019–20 | QMJHL playoffs cancelled due to ongoing COVID-19 pandemic | | | |
| 2020–21 | Lost round-robin tournament | Did not advance | | |
| 2021–22 | 2–3 – Rimouski Océanic | Did not advance | | |
| 2022–23 | 1–4 – Gatineau Olympiques | Did not advance | | |
| 2023–24 | 0–4 – Drummondville Voltigeurs | Did not advance | | |
| 2024–25 | Did not qualify | | | |
| 2025–26 | 0–4 – Moncton Wildcats | Did not advance | | |

=== Memorial Cup ===
The Memorial Cup is contested annually by the champions of the Ontario Hockey League (OHL), Quebec Maritimes Junior Hockey League (QMJHL), and Western Hockey League (WHL), as well as a predetermined host team. The competition consists of a round-robin, a semifinal game, and a final game. Below are the results of every game the Saint John Sea Dogs have competed in.

| Year | Round-robin | Semifinal | Final |
|---|---|---|---|
| 2011 | 4–3 Mississauga St. Michael's Majors | Bye | 3–1 Mississauga St. Michael's Majors |
| 2011 | 3–2 Owen Sound Attack | Bye | 3–1 Mississauga St. Michael's Majors |
| 2011 | 4–5 Kootenay Ice | Bye | 3–1 Mississauga St. Michael's Majors |
| 2012 | 3–5 London Knights | 4–7 Shawinigan Cataractes | |
| 2012 | 5–2 Edmonton Oil Kings | 4–7 Shawinigan Cataractes | |
| 2012 | 4–1 Shawinigan Cataractes | 4–7 Shawinigan Cataractes | |
| 2017 | 2–3 Windsor Spitfires | 3–6 Erie Otters | |
| 2017 | 7–12 Erie Otters | 3–6 Erie Otters | |
| 2017 | 7–0 Seattle Thunderbirds | 3–6 Erie Otters | |
| 2022 (Note: Host team) | 5–3 Hamilton Bulldogs | Bye | 6–3 Hamilton Bulldogs |
| 2022 | 3–4 Edmonton Oil Kings | Bye | 6–3 Hamilton Bulldogs |
| 2022 | 5–3 Shawinigan Cataractes | Bye | 6–3 Hamilton Bulldogs |

== See also ==
- List of ice hockey teams in New Brunswick
