= Stanislav Galiev =

Russian ice hockey player (born 1992)

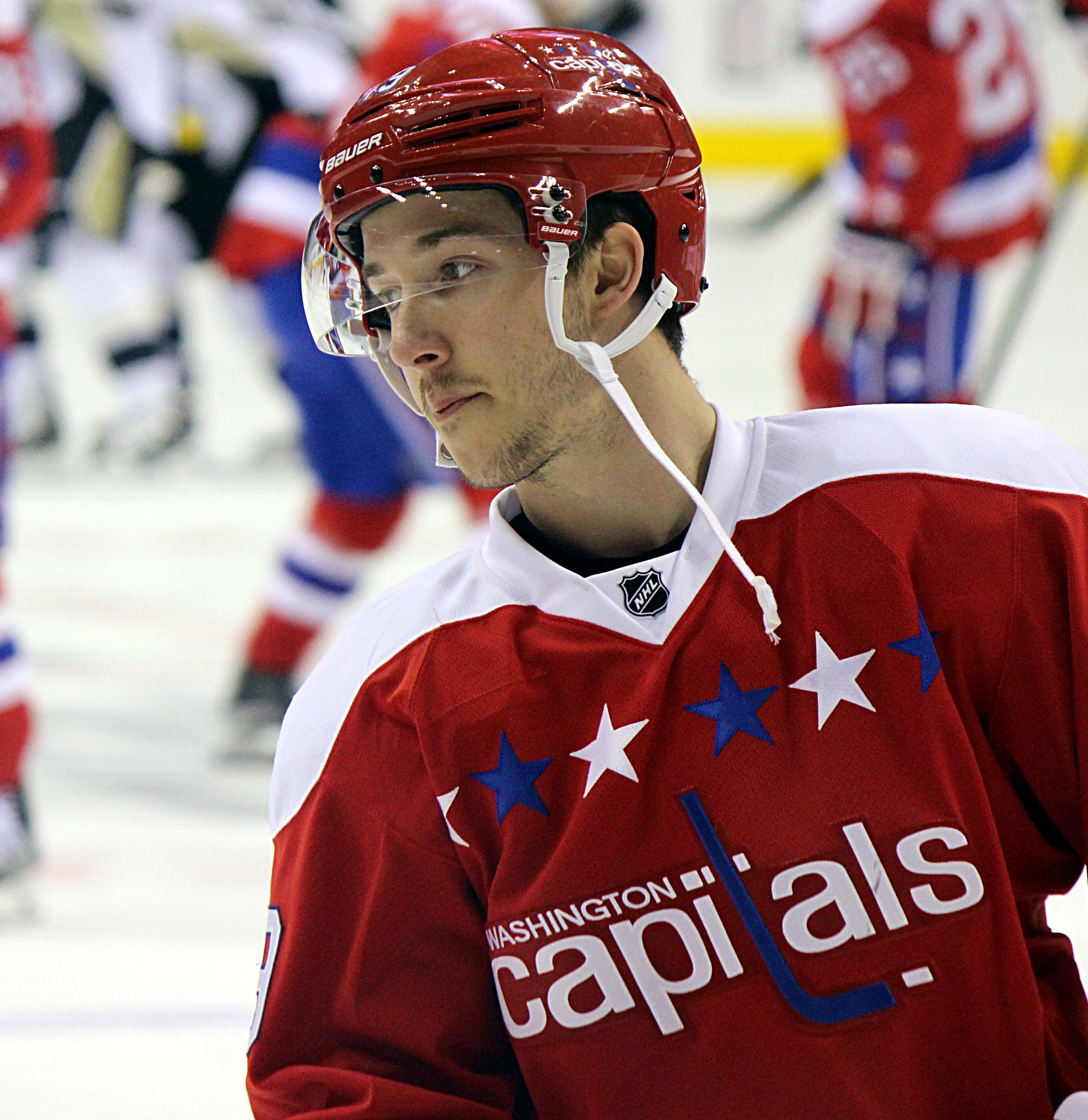
- Galiev with the Capitals in 2016.
- Born: January 17, 1992 (age 34) Moscow, Russia
- Height: 6 ft 1 in (185 cm)
- Weight: 188 lb (85 kg; 13 st 6 lb)
- Position: Right wing
- Shoots: Right
- KHL team Former teams: CSKA Moscow; Washington Capitals; Ak Bars Kazan; Dynamo Moscow; Avangard Omsk
- National team: Russia
- NHL draft: 86th overall, 2010; Washington Capitals
- Playing career: 2012–present

Stanislav Galiev (Russian: Станислав Галиев; born 17 January 1992) is a Russian professional ice hockey right winger for HC CSKA Moscow of the Kontinental Hockey League (KHL). He previously played for the Washington Capitals of the National Hockey League (NHL).

== Playing career ==
As a youth, Galiev played in the 2005 Quebec International Pee-Wee Hockey Tournament with a team from Moscow.

He played junior ice hockey with the Saint John Sea Dogs of the Quebec Major Junior Hockey League. He was drafted by the Washington Capitals in the 3rd round (86th overall) of the 2010 NHL entry draft. Galiev made his NHL debut for the Capitals in the 2014–15 season, on April 8, 2015, against the Boston Bruins and scored his first NHL goal on April 11, 2015, against the New York Rangers in the last game of the regular season.

After five seasons within the Capitals organization and unable to make an impression in the NHL, Galiev left as a free agent and returned to Russia to sign a two-year contract with Ak Bars Kazan of the KHL on July 14, 2017.

Galiev remained with Ak Bars for four seasons, before leaving the club as a free agent at the conclusion of the 2020–21 season. He was signed to a lucrative two-year contract with HC Dynamo Moscow on 1 May 2021.

After a lone season with Dynamo Moscow, Galiev was returned by Dynamo to former club Ak Bars Kazan in a trade for Jordan Weal on 1 July 2022.

Galiev played two further seasons with Ak Bars before leaving the club as a free agent to sign a one-year contract with Avangard Omsk on 30 July 2024. During the 2024–25 season, Galiev struggled to produce offensively with Avangard, posting just 2 goals and 7 points through 33 regular season games. On 24 December 2024, Galiev was traded to HC CSKA Moscow in exchange for future considerations.

== International play ==
Medal record

Ice hockey

Representing ROC

Olympic Games
Silver medal – second place	2022 Beijing	

Representing Russia

Ivan Hlinka Memorial Tournament
Silver medal – second place	2009 Slovakia	

Galiev played with the Russian junior team at the 2009 Ivan Hlinka Memorial Tournament, helping capture a silver medal.

On 23 January 2022, Galiev was named to the roster to represent Russian Olympic Committee athletes at the 2022 Winter Olympics.

== Career statistics ==
=== Regular season and playoffs ===
			Regular season					Playoffs
Season	Team	League	GP	G	A	Pts	PIM	GP	G	A	Pts	PIM
2008–09	Indiana Ice	USHL	60	29	35	64	46	13	5	4	9	8
2009–10	Saint John Sea Dogs	QMJHL	67	15	45	60	38	21	8	11	19	14
2010–11	Saint John Sea Dogs	QMJHL	64	37	28	65	40	19	10	17	27	12
2011–12	Saint John Sea Dogs	QMJHL	20	13	6	19	16	17	16	18	34	6
2012–13	Hershey Bears	AHL	17	0	1	1	8	—	—	—	—	—
2012–13	Reading Royals	ECHL	46	23	24	47	32	10	4	7	11	0
2013–14	Hershey Bears	AHL	16	3	3	6	0	—	—	—	—	—
2013–14	Reading Royals	ECHL	14	5	8	13	6	3	1	1	2	0
2014–15	Hershey Bears	AHL	67	25	20	45	24	5	1	0	1	0
2014–15	Washington Capitals	NHL	2	1	0	1	0	—	—	—	—	—
2015–16	Hershey Bears	AHL	5	3	0	3	2	—	—	—	—	—
2015–16	Washington Capitals	NHL	24	0	3	3	4	—	—	—	—	—
2016–17	Hershey Bears	AHL	56	21	19	40	20	12	3	4	7	4
2017–18	Ak Bars Kazan	KHL	52	12	14	26	55	19	10	5	15	8
2018–19	Ak Bars Kazan	KHL	59	10	12	22	38	4	0	0	0	0
2019–20	Ak Bars Kazan	KHL	54	16	17	33	16	4	2	2	4	0
2020–21	Ak Bars Kazan	KHL	52	16	11	27	16	15	4	5	9	2
2021–22	Dynamo Moscow	KHL	47	25	17	42	12	11	6	0	6	12
2022–23	Ak Bars Kazan	KHL	58	17	17	34	12	24	7	4	11	2
2023–24	Ak Bars Kazan	KHL	61	7	16	23	14	5	0	0	0	2
2024–25	Avangard Omsk	KHL	33	2	5	7	6	—	—	—	—	—
2024–25	CSKA Moscow	KHL	21	4	2	6	2	2	0	0	0	2
NHL totals			26	1	3	4	4	—	—	—	—	—
KHL totals			437	109	111	220	171	84	29	16	45	28

=== International ===
Year	Team	Event	Result	GP	G	A	Pts	PIM
2009	Russia	IH18	2nd place, silver medalist(s)	4	1	2	3	4
2022	ROC	OG	2nd place, silver medalist(s)	4	0	0	0	2
Junior totals				4	1	2	3	4
Senior totals				4	0	0	0	2

== Awards and honours ==
Award	Year
USHL
All-Rookie team	2009
All-Star Game	2009
Clark Cup (Indiana Ice)	2009
QMJHL
CHL Top Prospects Game	2010
All-Rookie Team	2010
Memorial Cup (Saint John Sea Dogs)	2011
ECHL
Kelly Cup (Reading Royals)	2013
KHL
Gagarin Cup (Ak Bars Kazan)	2018
