= Yann Sauvé =

Canadian ice hockey player

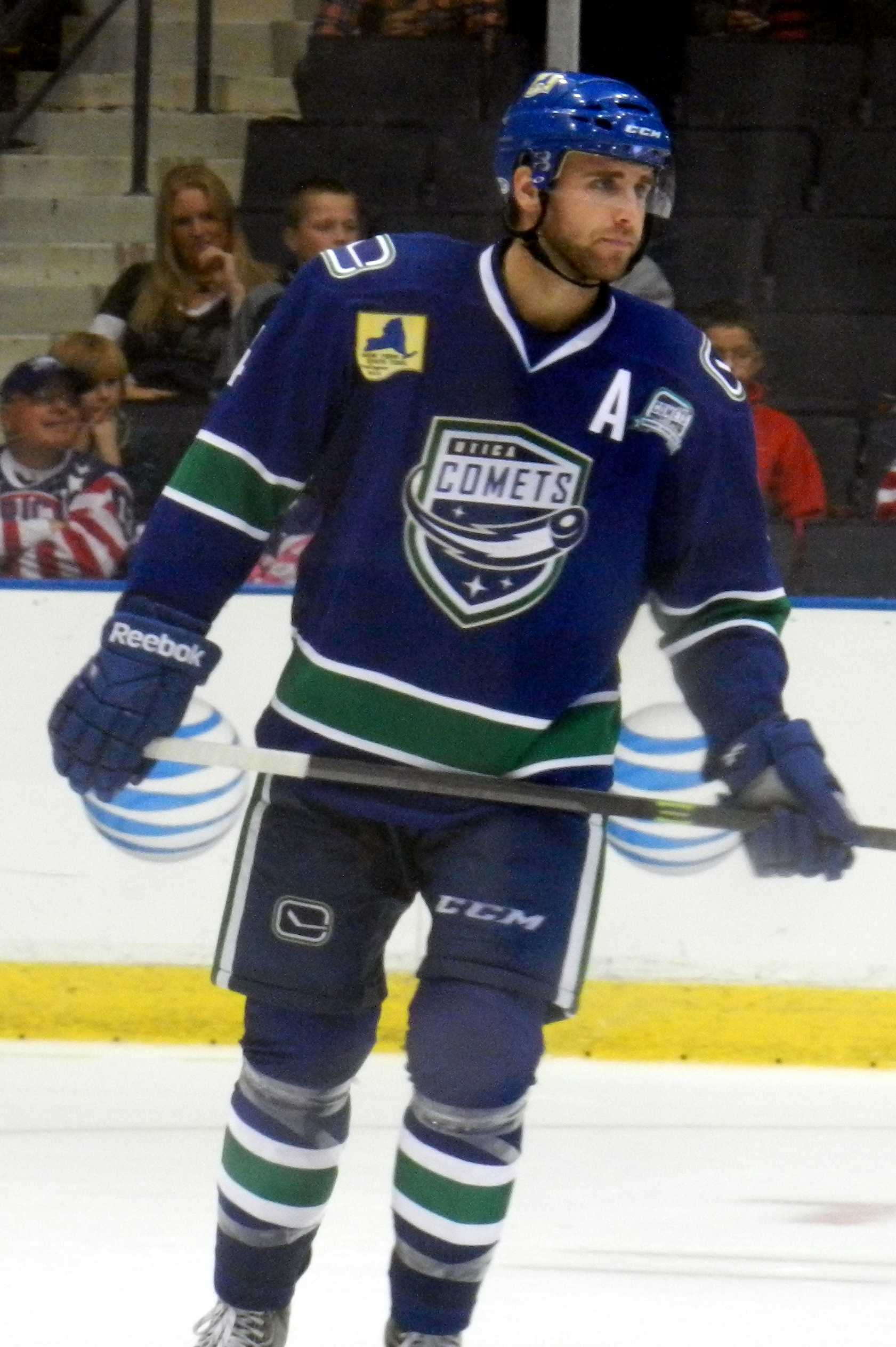
- Sauvé with the Utica Comets in 2013
- Born: February 18, 1990 (age 36) Montreal, Quebec, Canada
- Height: 6 ft 3 in (191 cm)
- Weight: 213 lb (97 kg; 15 st 3 lb)
- Position: Defence
- Shoots: Left
- Magnus team Former teams: Brûleurs de Loups; Vancouver Canucks; KHL Medveščak Zagreb; EHC München; Nottingham Panthers; EC VSV
- NHL draft: 41st overall, 2008; Vancouver Canucks
- Playing career: 2010–present

Yann Michel Sauvé (born February 18, 1990) is a Canadian professional ice hockey defenceman who is currently playing for Brûleurs de Loups of the Ligue Magnus. He was drafted by the National Hockey League (NHL)'s Vancouver Canucks in the 2008 NHL entry draft, selected in the second round, 41st overall. He played major junior hockey with the Saint John Sea Dogs of the Quebec Major Junior Hockey League (QMJHL) for four seasons before he joined the Canucks' minor league affiliates in 2010. He split the 2010–11 season between the Canucks and their two minor league teams, the Victoria Salmon Kings of the ECHL and the Manitoba Moose of the American Hockey League (AHL). The Canucks changed AHL affiliates twice, and Sauve joined the Chicago Wolves and Utica Comets as a result. Sauvé was born in Montreal, Quebec, but grew up in Rigaud, Quebec.

== Playing career ==
As a youth, Sauvé played in the 2003 Quebec International Pee-Wee Hockey Tournament with a minor ice hockey team from La Presqu'île.

=== Junior ===
After a year of minor hockey with the Chateauguay Patriotes, Sauvé was selected first overall by the Saint John Sea Dogs in the 2006 Quebec Major Junior Hockey League (QMJHL) Entry Draft. He began his junior career with the Sea Dogs the following season in 2006–07, recording two goals and 15 points over 60 games as a rookie. After his first QMJHL season had ended, Sauvé was named to Canada's national team for the 2007 IIHF World U18 Championships, held in Rauma and Tampere, Finland. He recorded one assist over six games, as Canada was defeated in the bronze medal game by Sweden.

The following season, he improved to 6 goals and 21 points. After ranking as the 21st-best prospect among North American skaters in the NHL Central Scouting Bureau (CSB)'s mid-season listings, he was chosen to compete in the CHL Top Prospects Game in January 2008. During the contest, which showcases the best junior players in Canada eligible for the NHL entry draft, Sauvé gained notoriety by fighting Steven Stamkos. He then helped the Sea Dogs to the franchise's first playoff appearance, advancing to the semifinals, where they were defeated by the Rouyn-Noranda Huskies. Sauvé had a goal and two assists in 14 playoff games.

After completing the campaign, the CSB dropped him eight places to 29th in their final rankings of North American prospects. With his individual ranking dropping with each listing, he was also chosen as one of the five most overrated prospects for the draft. Sauvé was selected in the second round, 41st overall, by the Vancouver Canucks. He was scouted as a physically imposing stay-at-home defenceman who had failed to live to expectations in the QMJHL after being selected first overall in the league's entry draft two years prior. Sauvé described himself as a player in the same mould as Mike Komisarek.

Upon his draft, he returned to the QMJHL for two more seasons. In 2008–09, he scored 5 goals and 30 points. After the Sea Dogs were eliminated in the playoffs, Sauvé was signed to an amateur tryout contract by the Canucks' American Hockey League (AHL) affiliate, the Manitoba Moose, who were finishing their 2008–09 AHL season. However, after a week, he was released from his tryout without having played a game. Competing in his fourth and final junior season the following campaign, he recorded a QMJHL career-high 7 goals, 29 assists and 36 points. Near the beginning of the season, he was named the league's defensive player of the week after recording a goal and four assists over three games from October 19–25, 2009. After the Sea Dogs won the Jean Rougeau Trophy as the team with the best regular season record, they advanced to the QMJHL finals, where they were defeated in six games by the Moncton Wildcats. Sauvé contributed 15 points in 21 playoff games.

=== Professional ===
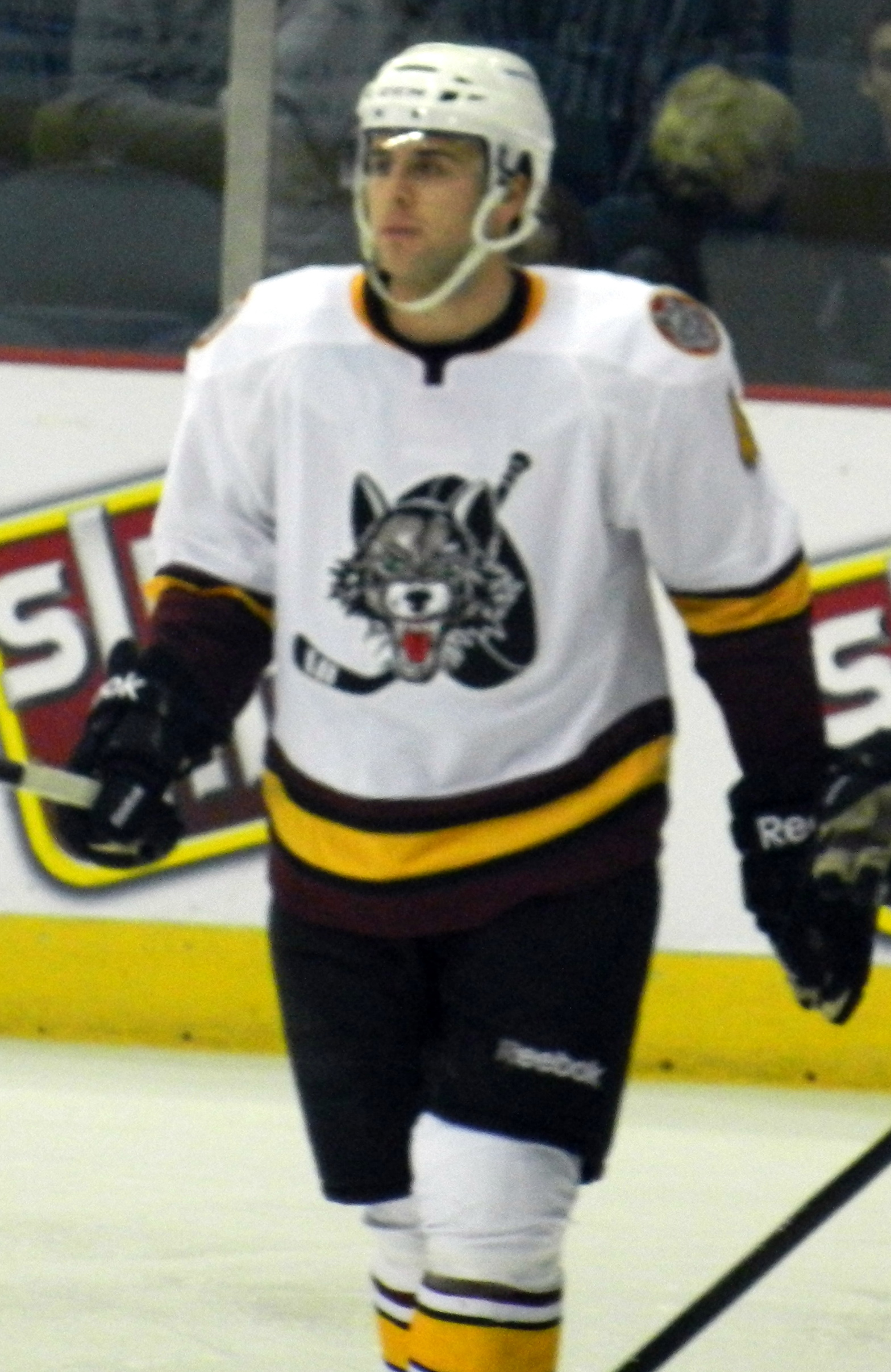
Sauve playing for the Chicago Wolves in 2011

On May 31, 2010, Sauvé signed a three-year, entry-level contract with the Vancouver Canucks. While in Vancouver for the team's 2010 training camp, Sauvé was hit by a car while crossing the street, suffering a concussion that sidelined him for over two months. Unable to play, he was subsequently assigned to the Moose. After being cleared to play, Sauvé was reassigned by the Moose to the Canucks' third-tier ECHL affiliate, the Victoria Salmon Kings. He made his professional debut November 26, 2010, against the Idaho Steelheads. The following day, he recorded his first professional point, an assist, against the Steelheads. After seven games with Victoria, Sauvé was recalled to Manitoba on December 16. He recorded an assist in each of his first two AHL games, both against the Chicago Wolves.

By February 2011, the Canucks were playing with four of their regular defencemen sidelined. After Andrew Alberts suffered a wrist injury on February 14, Sauvé was called up to the NHL club as a replacement. He made his NHL debut the following day against the Minnesota Wild, registering 12 minutes of ice time in a 4–1 win.

In 2014, as a free agent, Sauvé signed with the Orlando Solar Bears. Sauvé currently holds the record for the fastest shot competition for the ECHL All-Star Classic, at nearly 100 miles per hour. In the 2014–15 season, he appeared in just 13 regular season games with the Solar Bears, as he was loaned out to the AHL on three separate occasions with the St. John's IceCaps, Springfield Falcons and Providence Bruins.

On July 16, 2015, Sauvé secured a one-year AHL contract as a free agent with the Portland Pirates. In the 2015–16 season, Sauvé appeared in just 3 games with the Pirates as he was unable to secure a role on the club. He was reassigned to the ECHL with the Manchester Monarchs before on March 7, 2016, he was traded to the Stockton Heat in exchange for future considerations.

As a free agent in the off-season, Sauvé opted to pursue a career abroad, agreeing to an initial try-out contract with Croatian club KHL Medveščak Zagreb of the Kontinental Hockey League (KHL) on July 20, 2016. Throughout the 2016–17 season, he appeared in 25 games, scoring 3 points. After Zagreb failed to qualify for the KHL playoffs, on February 9, 2017, Sauvé returned to the ECHL to join the Manchester Monarchs for the remainder of their season. However, after just two games with Manchester, he signed a contract in Germany with EHC München of the Deutsche Eishockey Liga (DEL) on February 17, 2017.

On August 12, 2017, Sauvé moved to the United Kingdom to sign for the Nottingham Panthers of the Elite Ice Hockey League (EIHL). After a couple of other stops in Europe, Sauve returned to Quebec and played for the Laval North Petroliers for the 2021–22 season.

== Career statistics ==
=== Regular season and playoffs ===
| | | | Regular season | | | | | Playoffs |
| Season | Team | League | GP | G | A | Pts | PIM | GP | G | A | Pts | PIM |
|---|---|---|---|---|---|---|---|---|---|---|---|---|
| 2006–07 | Saint John Sea Dogs | QMJHL | 60 | 2 | 13 | 15 | 75 | — | — | — | — | — |
| 2007–08 | Sain John Sea Dogs | QMJHL | 69 | 6 | 15 | 21 | 92 | 14 | 1 | 2 | 3 | 23 |
| 2008–09 | Saint John Sea Dogs | QMJHL | 61 | 5 | 25 | 30 | 64 | 4 | 0 | 2 | 2 | 8 |
| 2009–10 | Saint John Sea Dogs | QMJHL | 61 | 7 | 29 | 36 | 65 | 21 | 5 | 10 | 15 | 36 |
| 2010–11 | Victoria Salmon Kings | ECHL | 8 | 0 | 2 | 2 | 4 | — | — | — | — | — |
| 2010–11 | Manitoba Moose | AHL | 39 | 3 | 11 | 14 | 24 | 13 | 0 | 1 | 1 | 4 |
| 2010–11 | Vancouver Canucks | NHL | 5 | 0 | 0 | 0 | 0 | — | — | — | — | — |
| 2011–12 | Chicago Wolves | AHL | 73 | 3 | 6 | 9 | 78 | 3 | 0 | 1 | 1 | 2 |
| 2012–13 | Kalamazoo Wings | ECHL | 32 | 10 | 9 | 19 | 40 | — | — | — | — | — |
| 2012–13 | Chicago Wolves | AHL | 17 | 0 | 2 | 2 | 10 | — | — | — | — | — |
| 2013–14 | Utica Comets | AHL | 67 | 1 | 13 | 14 | 63 | — | — | — | — | — |
| 2013–14 | Vancouver Canucks | NHL | 3 | 0 | 0 | 0 | 0 | — | — | — | — | — |
| 2014–15 | Orlando Solar Bears | ECHL | 13 | 2 | 2 | 4 | 19 | 4 | 0 | 2 | 2 | 4 |
| 2014–15 | St. John's IceCaps | AHL | 4 | 1 | 0 | 1 | 0 | — | — | — | — | — |
| 2014–15 | Springfield Falcons | AHL | 17 | 0 | 2 | 2 | 12 | — | — | — | — | — |
| 2014–15 | Providence Bruins | AHL | 4 | 0 | 1 | 1 | 2 | — | — | — | — | — |
| 2015–16 | Portland Pirates | AHL | 3 | 0 | 1 | 1 | 0 | — | — | — | — | — |
| 2015–16 | Manchester Monarchs | ECHL | 52 | 7 | 22 | 29 | 52 | 5 | 0 | 1 | 1 | 6 |
| 2015–16 | Stockton Heat | AHL | 4 | 0 | 0 | 0 | 2 | — | — | — | — | — |
| 2016–17 | KHL Medveščak Zagreb | KHL | 25 | 2 | 1 | 3 | 61 | — | — | — | — | — |
| 2016–17 | Manchester Monarchs | ECHL | 2 | 0 | 2 | 2 | 2 | — | — | — | — | — |
| 2016–17 | EHC München | DEL | 1 | 0 | 0 | 0 | 25 | 12 | 0 | 1 | 1 | 4 |
| 2017–18 | Nottingham Panthers | EIHL | 54 | 10 | 27 | 37 | 96 | 4 | 1 | 2 | 3 | 2 |
| 2018–19 | KHL Medveščak Zagreb | EBEL | 24 | 6 | 8 | 14 | 12 | — | — | — | — | — |
| 2018–19 | EC VSV | EBEL | 25 | 2 | 10 | 12 | 26 | — | — | — | — | — |
| 2019–20 | Brûleurs de Loups | FRA | 36 | 6 | 15 | 21 | 57 | 4 | 0 | 2 | 2 | 4 |
| NHL totals | | | 8 | 0 | 0 | 0 | 0 | — | — | — | — | — |

=== International ===
| Year | Team | Event | Result | GP | G | A | Pts | PIM |
|---|---|---|---|---|---|---|---|---|
| 2006 | Canada Quebec | WHC17 | 1st place, gold medalist(s) | 6 | 1 | 1 | 2 | 8 |
| 2007 | Canada | WJC18 | 4th | 6 | 0 | 1 | 1 | 4 |
| Junior totals | | | | 12 | 1 | 2 | 3 | 12 |
