= Tomáš Jurčo =

Slovak ice hockey player (born 1992)

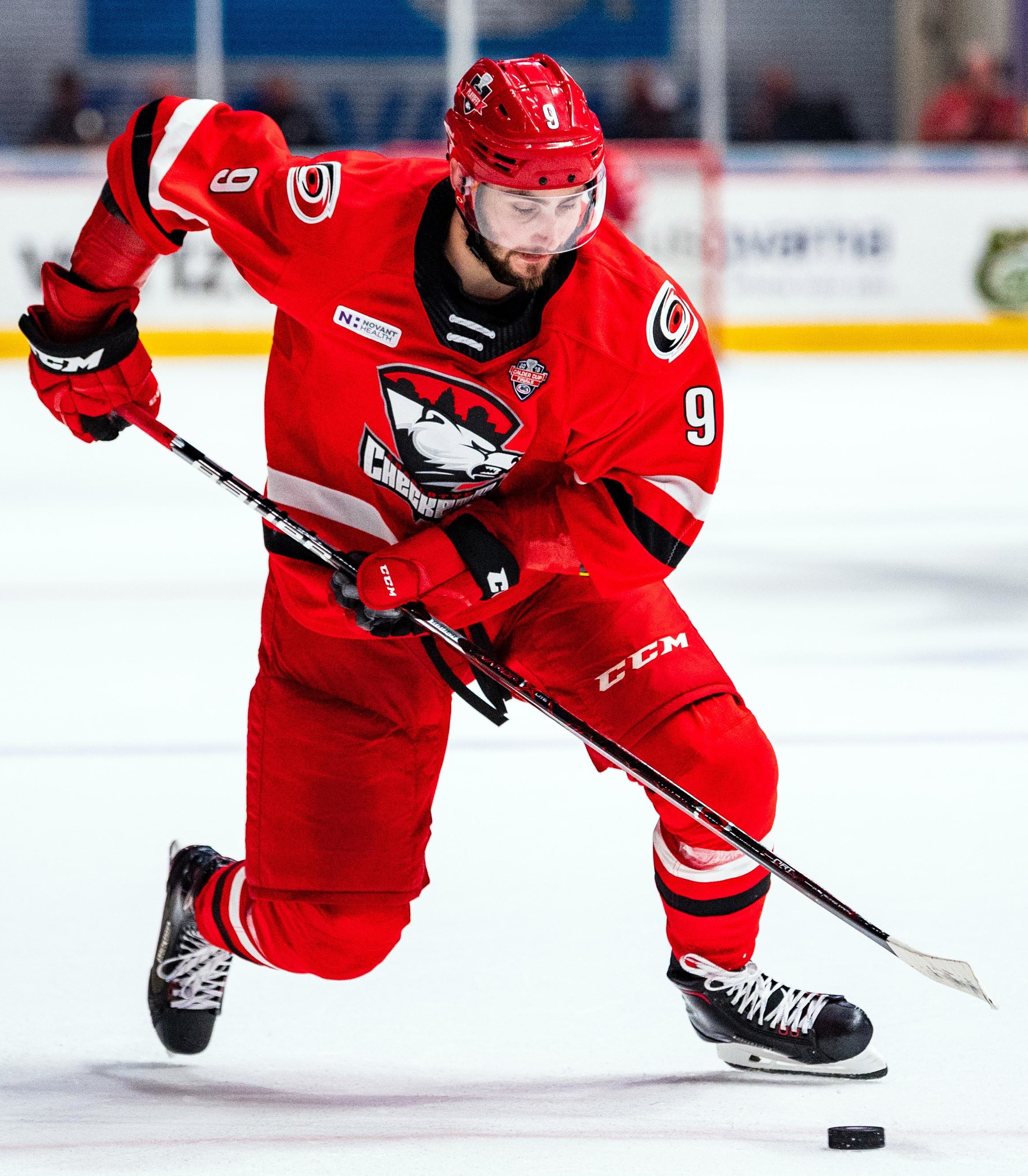
- Jurčo with the Charlotte Checkers in 2019
- Born: 28 December 1992 (age 33) Košice, Czechoslovakia
- Height: 6 ft 1 in (185 cm)
- Weight: 203 lb (92 kg; 14 st 7 lb)
- Position: Right wing
- Shoots: Left
- Slovak team Former teams: HC Košice; Detroit Red Wings; Chicago Blackhawks; Edmonton Oilers; Vegas Golden Knights; Barys Nur-Sultan; Kunlun Red Star; HC Davos; Avangard Omsk; Lada Togliatti
- National team: Slovakia
- NHL draft: 35th overall, 2011; Detroit Red Wings
- Playing career: 2009–present

Tomáš Jurčo (born 28 December 1992) is a Slovak professional ice hockey right winger who is currently playing for HC Košice of the Slovak Extraliga (Slovak). He began playing hockey with Košice before moving to North America in 2009 to play for the Saint John Sea Dogs of the Quebec Major Junior Hockey League (QMJHL). He spent three seasons with Saint John, helping them win the Memorial Cup as major junior champions of Canada in 2011. Jurčo was drafted in the second round, 35th overall, by the Detroit Red Wings in the 2011 NHL entry draft.

== Playing career ==
=== Junior ===
At the 2009 CHL Import Draft, Jurčo was selected fourth overall by the Saint John Sea Dogs of the Quebec Major Junior Hockey League (QMJHL). He joined the team that year and was nominated for the 2009–10 QMJHL Rookie of the Year award. His skill set involves a unique set of hands and a good sense of vision on the ice, and he was compared to his favourite player and fellow countryman, Marián Hossa. Jurčo's videos demonstrating his skills are popular among hockey fans on YouTube. Jurčo was a key contributor in the Sea Dogs' Memorial Cup championship title in 2011, where Saint John defeated the Mississauga St. Michael's Majors 3–1 in the Final.

On 25 June 2011, the Detroit Red Wings drafted Jurčo in the second round, 35th overall, as the team's first pick in the 2011 NHL entry draft.

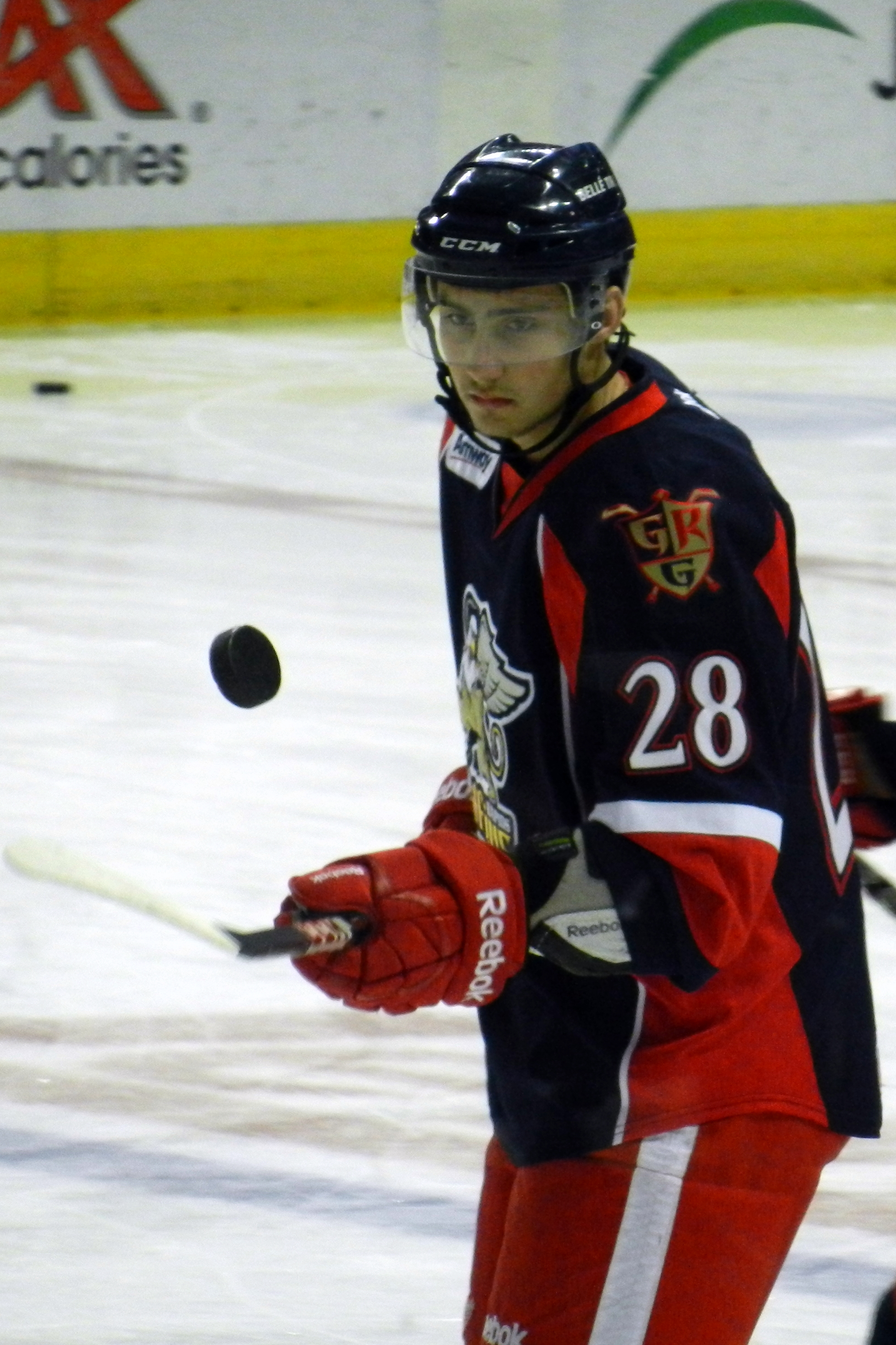
Jurčo with the Griffins.

=== Professional ===
On 7 August 2012, Jurčo signed a three-year, entry-level contract with the Red Wings. He was then assigned to the team's American Hockey League (AHL) affiliate, the Grand Rapids Griffins, for the 2012–13 season. He recorded 14 goals and 14 assists in 74 games in his first professional season. Jurčo was among the team's leading scorers during the 2013 Calder Cup playoffs, recording eight goals and six assists to help lead the Griffins to the Calder Cup championship over the Syracuse Crunch.

Jurčo began the 2013–14 season with the Griffins before being called up to the Detroit Red Wings. At the time of his first call-up, Jurčo led the Griffins in goals (11), assists (16), points (27) and power play goals (5). On 15 December 2013, Jurčo made his NHL debut for the Red Wings in a game against the Tampa Bay Lightning. Two nights later, on 17 December, he scored his first career NHL goal against Jonas Hiller of the Anaheim Ducks.

On 24 July 2015, Jurčo signed a two-year contract extension with the Red Wings. On 17 November 2015, Jurčo was assigned to the Grand Rapids Griffins on a conditioning assignment. Before being assigned to Grand Rapids, Jurčo appeared in four games for the Red Wings that season, recording one assist. On 20 November, Jurčo tied a franchise record with three power play goals, becoming just the third Griffin to accomplish the feat. Jurčo was named the CCM/AHL Player of the Week for the week ending 22 November. He posted a league-best seven points for the week, three goals, and four assists, and helped lead the Griffins to three consecutive wins, tallying assists on all three game-winning goals. On 28 November, Jurčo was recalled by the Red Wings from his conditioning assignment. In five games for the Griffins, Jurčo recorded five goals and four assists and helped lead the Griffins in winning all five games he appeared in.

On 24 February 2017, Jurčo was traded to the Chicago Blackhawks in exchange for a third-round pick in the 2017 draft. During his career with the Red Wings, he recorded 15 goals and 24 assists in 159 games. He closed out the regular season with the Blackhawks in scoring just 1 goal in 13 games and was a healthy scratch through Chicago's first-round defeat to the Nashville Predators. As a restricted free agent, on 26 June 2017, Jurčo was re-signed to a one-year contract extension with the Blackhawks.

At the conclusion of his contract with the Blackhawks, Jurčo remained a free agent over the summer and into the 2018–19 season. At the mid-point of the season, Jurčo belatedly signed a one-year AHL contract with the Springfield Thunderbirds, affiliate to the Florida Panthers on 3 January 2019. Jurčo posted 10 points in 14 games with the Thunderbirds before he was dealt to the Charlotte Checkers in exchange for future considerations, correlating in the Florida Panthers acquisition of Cliff Pu, on 25 February 2019. Jurčo made an immediate impact with the league-leading Checkers, contributing with 17 points in 19 regular season games. He helped Charlotte capture the Calder Cup with 18 points in 18 games, marking his second AHL championship.

On 1 July 2019, Jurčo was signed by former Red Wings general manager Ken Holland as a free agent with the Edmonton Oilers on a one-year $750,000 contract. He began the 2019–20 season, on the Oilers opening night roster, registering two assists through 12 games before he was re-assigned to AHL affiliate, the Bakersfield Condors. Suffering an injury, Jurčo was limited to just eight games with the Condors before the remainder of the season was cancelled due to the COVID-19 pandemic.

As a free agent from the Oilers, Jurčo signed a one-year, $700,000 contract with the Vegas Golden Knights on 10 October 2020.

On 3 November 2021, Jurčo belatedly signed a one-year contract with Barys Nur-Sultan of the Kontinental Hockey League (KHL). In his lone season with Barys in 2021–22, Jurčo was immediately inserted into the line-up and registered 11 points through 17 regular season games.

Leading into the following 2022–23 season, Jurčo again remained un-signed until opting to continue in the KHL by joining Chinese club, Kunlun Red Star on 24 November 2022.

After tenures with HC Davos and Avangard Omsk, Jurčo rejoined Kunlun Red Star on a one-year contract for the 2024–25 season on 26 July 2024.

On 2 July 2026, Jurčo opted to return to hometown club, HC Košice of the Slovak Extraliga, agreeing to a one-year contract.

== International play ==
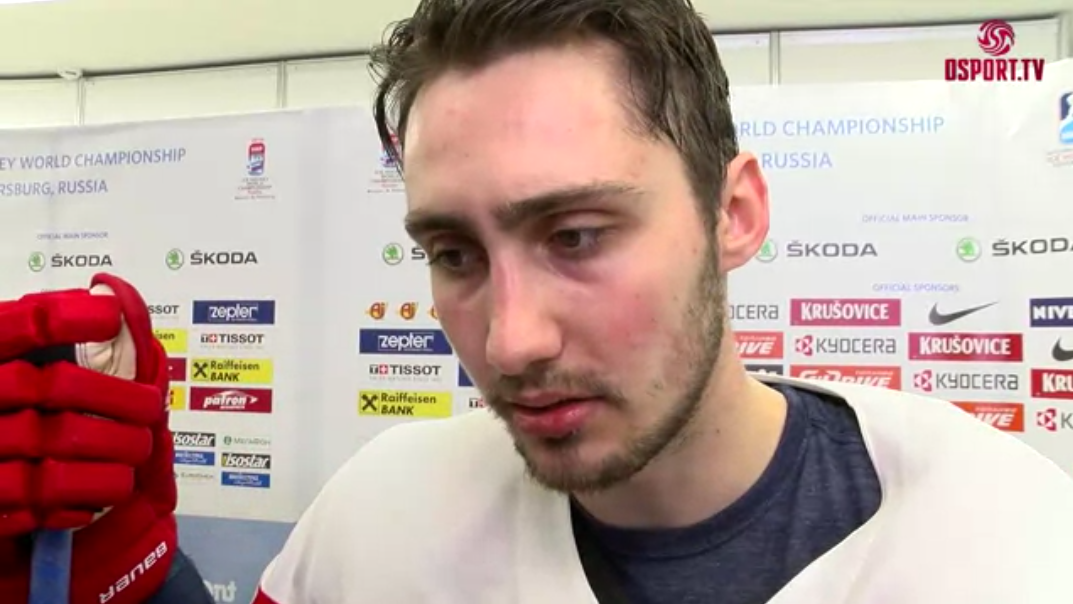
- Jurco at the 2016 IIHF World Championship.

Medal record

Representing Slovakia

Ice hockey

Olympic Games
Bronze medal – third place	2022 Beijing	

Jurčo represented Slovakia at the 2011 World Junior Ice Hockey Championships, scoring one point in six games. He again represented Slovakia at the 2012 World Junior Ice Hockey Championships, where he was the leading scorer on the team, recording one goal and seven assists in five games.

Jurčo was selected to play for the senior Slovakia team at the 2014 Winter Olympics in Sochi, where he finished the tournament with one goal in four games.

Jurčo represented Slovakia at the 2015 IIHF World Championship, where he recorded one assist in five games. Jurčo represented Slovakia at the 2016 IIHF World Championship, where he recorded two goals and three assists in seven games.

== Personal life ==
Jurčo is the younger brother of Petra Jurčová, a veteran of the Slovak women's ice hockey team.

== Career statistics ==
=== Regular season and playoffs ===
			Regular season					Playoffs
Season	Team	League	GP	G	A	Pts	PIM	GP	G	A	Pts	PIM
2007–08	HC Košice	SVK U18	57	28	24	52	30	—	—	—	—	—
2008–09	HC Košice	SVK U18	5	8	5	13	2	—	—	—	—	—
2008–09	HC Košice	SVK U20	48	19	30	49	20	3	5	0	5	0
2009–10	Saint John Sea Dogs	QMJHL	64	26	25	51	24	21	7	10	17	8
2010–11	Saint John Sea Dogs	QMJHL	60	31	25	56	17	19	6	12	18	8
2011–12	Saint John Sea Dogs	QMJHL	48	30	38	68	37	16	13	16	29	12
2012–13	Grand Rapids Griffins	AHL	74	14	14	28	22	24	8	6	14	21
2013–14	Grand Rapids Griffins	AHL	32	13	19	32	14	8	5	2	7	11
2013–14	Detroit Red Wings	NHL	36	8	7	15	14	3	0	0	0	0
2014–15	Detroit Red Wings	NHL	63	3	15	18	14	7	1	1	2	2
2015–16	Grand Rapids Griffins	AHL	5	5	4	9	4	—	—	—	—	—
2015–16	Detroit Red Wings	NHL	44	4	2	6	16	—	—	—	—	—
2016–17	Detroit Red Wings	NHL	16	0	0	0	2	—	—	—	—	—
2016–17	Grand Rapids Griffins	AHL	2	1	1	2	6	—	—	—	—	—
2016–17	Chicago Blackhawks	NHL	13	1	0	1	2	—	—	—	—	—
2017–18	Rockford IceHogs	AHL	36	13	12	25	38	—	—	—	—	—
2017–18	Chicago Blackhawks	NHL	29	6	4	10	12	—	—	—	—	—
2018–19	Springfield Thunderbirds	AHL	14	4	6	10	8	—	—	—	—	—
2018–19	Charlotte Checkers	AHL	19	8	9	17	14	18	7	11	18	18
2019–20	Edmonton Oilers	NHL	12	0	2	2	4	—	—	—	—	—
2019–20	Bakersfield Condors	AHL	8	4	3	7	10	—	—	—	—	—
2020–21	Henderson Silver Knights	AHL	22	4	7	11	21	4	1	1	2	2
2020–21	Vegas Golden Knights	NHL	8	0	1	1	0	—	—	—	—	—
2021–22	Barys Nur–Sultan	KHL	17	3	8	11	30	5	2	0	2	4
2022–23	Kunlun Red Star	KHL	32	10	15	25	16	—	—	—	—	—
2023–24	HC Davos	NL	17	6	3	9	6	—	—	—	—	—
2023–24	Avangard Omsk	KHL	21	8	8	16	2	12	3	2	5	8
2024–25	Kunlun Red Star	KHL	55	9	20	29	20	—	—	—	—	—
2025–26	Lada Togliatti	KHL	32	7	6	13	14	—	—	—	—	—
NHL totals			221	22	31	53	64	10	1	1	2	2
KHL totals			157	37	57	94	82	17	5	2	7	12

=== International ===
Year	Team	Event	Result	GP	G	A	Pts	PIM
2009	Slovakia	WJC18	7th	6	2	3	5	2
2011	Slovakia	WJC	8th	6	1	0	1	0
2012	Slovakia	WJC	6th	5	1	7	8	4
2014	Slovakia	OG	11th	4	1	0	1	2
2015	Slovakia	WC	9th	5	0	1	1	0
2016	Slovakia	WC	9th	7	2	3	5	0
2018	Slovakia	WC	9th	7	4	1	5	8
2021	Slovakia	OGQ	Q	3	0	1	1	6
2022	Slovakia	OG	3rd place, bronze medalist(s)	7	1	1	2	2
Junior totals				17	4	10	14	6
Senior totals				33	8	7	15	18

== Awards and honours ==
Award	Year
CHL
CHL/NHL Top Prospects Game	2011
Memorial Cup (Saint John Sea Dogs)	2011
AHL
Calder Cup (Grand Rapids Griffins)	2013
Calder Cup (Charlotte Checkers)	2019
