= Zack Phillips =

Canadian ice hockey player (born 1992)

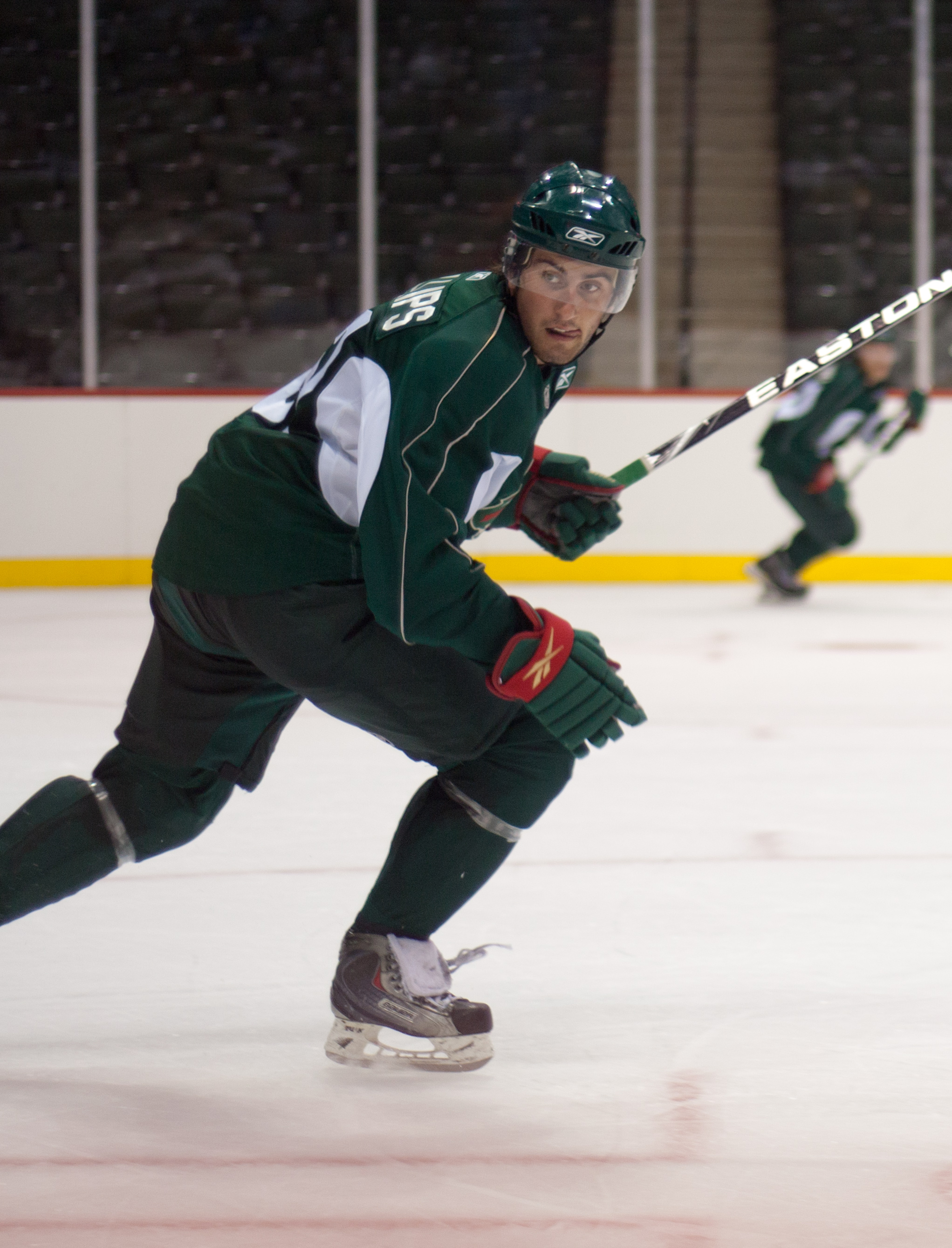
- Phillips with the Minnesota Wild in 2011
- Born: October 28, 1992 (age 33) Fredericton, New Brunswick, Canada
- Height: 6 ft 1 in (185 cm)
- Weight: 181 lb (82 kg; 12 st 13 lb)
- Position: Centre
- Shoots: Right
- EIHL team Former teams: Manchester Storm; Houston Aeros; Iowa Wild; Providence Bruins; Chicago Wolves; Tingsryds AIF; Nottingham Panthers; Fehérvár AV19; HK Dukla Michalovce; JKH GKS Jastrzębie; TH Unia Oświęcim; Starbulls Rosenheim; Fife Flyers; Füchse Duisburg
- NHL draft: 28th overall, 2011; Minnesota Wild
- Playing career: 2012–present

Zack Phillips (born October 28, 1992) is a Canadian professional ice hockey centre. He is currently playing for the British Elite Ice Hockey League (EIHL) side, Manchester Storm.

Phillips was most recently with German Oberliga side Starbulls Rosenheim, and prior to that iced in Poland for JKH GKS Jastrzębie and TH Unia Oświęcim.

== Playing career ==
Phillips played his junior hockey for the Saint John Sea Dogs of the Quebec Major Junior Hockey League. He was selected 28th overall in the 2011 NHL entry draft by the Minnesota Wild.

On December 19, 2011, the Minnesota Wild signed Phillips to a three-year entry-level contract.

In the 2014–15 season, on March 2, 2015, the Wild traded Phillips, while with AHL affiliate the Iowa Wild, to the Boston Bruins in exchange for Jared Knight. He was assigned to Boston's AHL affiliate the Providence Bruins.

In the following 2015–16 season, Phillips was unable to keep his initial scoring pace with the Providence Bruins and was assigned to ECHL affiliate, the Atlanta Gladiators. After 5 games with the Gladiators, Phillips was traded by the Bruins to the St. Louis Blues in exchange for future considerations on March 4, 2016.

At the conclusion of his NHL contract, Phillips chose to continue his professional career in Sweden, agreeing to a one-year deal Tingsryds AIF of the Allsvenskan on June 1, 2016.

After a spell in Sweden, Phillips moved to the UK to sign for EIHL side, the Nottingham Panthers on July 3, 2017. He then continued his journeyman career with Hungarian club, Fehérvár AV19, competing in the Austrian Hockey League (EBEL) for the 2018–19 season.

Having played three seasons abroad in Europe, Phillips returned to North America prior to the 2019–20 season, agreeing to a contract with the Toledo Walleye of the ECHL on August 7, 2019. Phillips made 12 appearances with the Walleye, registering just 3 points, before he was released on November 25, 2019. He joined the Worcester Railers, making 2 appearances before he was traded to join his third ECHL club for the season with the Norfolk Admirals on December 2, 2019. He registered a further 5 points in 17 games with the Admirals before leaving the ECHL to sign with Slovak club, HK Dukla Michalovce, for the remainder of the season.

In September 2020, Phillips signed with Polska Hokej Liga side JKH GKS Jastrzębie. In 2021, Phillips remained in Poland to sign for TH Unia Oświęcim, before leaving mid-season to join German club Starbulls Rosenheim.

In July 2022, Phillips agreed terms to return to the EIHL for the 2022–23 season - signing a one-year deal with the Fife Flyers.

In the summer of 2023, Phillips returned to Germany to sign for Füchse Duisburg. But in December 2023, he headed back to the EIHL for a third time to sign for Manchester Storm.

== Career statistics ==
			Regular season					Playoffs
Season	Team	League	GP	G	A	Pts	PIM	GP	G	A	Pts	PIM
2008–09	Lawrence Academy	HS-Prep	30	19	29	48	18	—	—	—	—	—
2009–10	Saint John Sea Dogs	QMJHL	65	16	28	44	31	21	2	4	6	4
2010–11	Saint John Sea Dogs	QMJHL	67	38	57	95	16	17	9	15	24	8
2011–12	Saint John Sea Dogs	QMJHL	60	30	50	80	32	4	2	10	12	2
2012–13	Houston Aeros	AHL	71	8	19	27	10	5	0	1	1	2
2013–14	Iowa Wild	AHL	76	12	21	33	16	—	—	—	—	—
2014–15	Iowa Wild	AHL	49	7	8	15	14	—	—	—	—	—
2014–15	Providence Bruins	AHL	16	3	8	11	0	2	0	0	0	4
2015–16	Providence Bruins	AHL	39	5	9	14	8	—	—	—	—	—
2015–16	Atlanta Gladiators	ECHL	5	1	1	2	0	—	—	—	—	—
2015–16	Chicago Wolves	AHL	9	0	0	0	6	—	—	—	—	—
2015–16	Kalamazoo Wings	ECHL	2	1	1	2	2	5	2	1	3	0
2016–17	Tingsryds AIF	Allsv	50	11	17	28	24	4	1	2	3	0
2017–18	Nottingham Panthers	EIHL	56	15	31	46	12	4	2	0	2	0
2018–19	Fehérvár AV19	EBEL	52	10	20	30	12	5	0	0	0	0
2019–20	Toledo Walleye	ECHL	12	2	1	3	6	—	—	—	—	—
2019–20	Worcester Railers	ECHL	2	0	0	0	0	—	—	—	—	—
2019–20	Norfolk Admirals	ECHL	17	5	1	6	6	—	—	—	—	—
2019–20	HK Dukla Michalovce	Slovak	12	4	5	9	2	—	—	—	—	—
2020–21	JKH GKS Jastrzębie	Polska Hokej Liga	35	17	25	42	12	14	8	6	14	2
2021–22	TH Unia Oświęcim	Polska Hokej Liga	9	4	2	6	4	—	—	—	—	—
2021–22	Starbulls Rosenheim	Oberliga	34	22	17	39	2	7	6	3	9	8
2022–23	Fife Flyers	EIHL	53	19	26	45	10	—	—	—	—	—
2023–24	Füchse Duisburg	Oberliga	24	6	8	14	6	—	—	—	—	—
2023–24	Manchester Storm	EIHL	36	10	11	21	2	2	0	0	0	0
AHL totals			260	35	65	100	54	7	0	1	1	6

Awards and achievements
Preceded by Jonas Brodin	Minnesota Wild first-round draft pick 2011	Succeeded by Mathew Dumba
