= David Perron =

Canadian ice hockey player (born 1988)

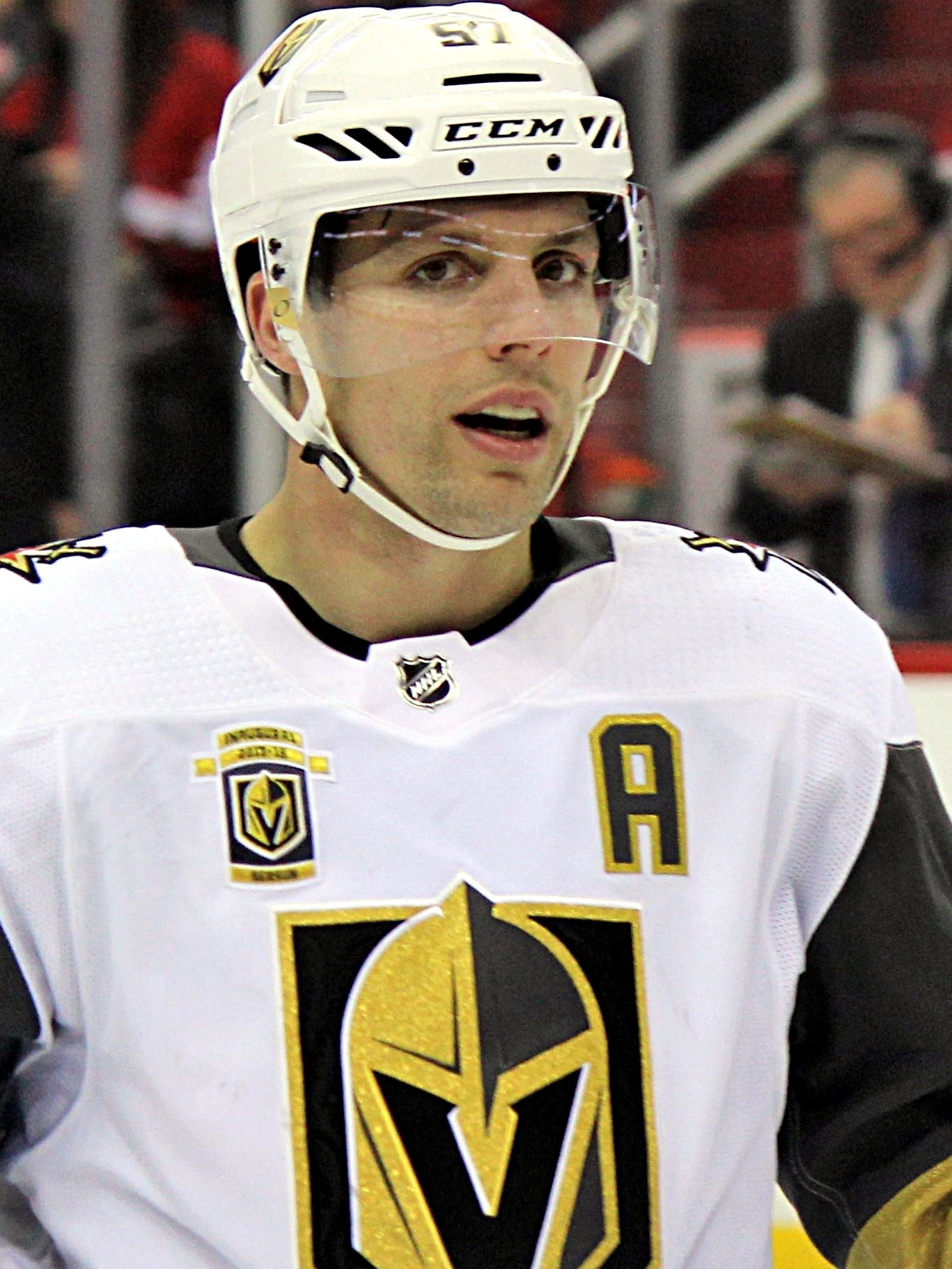
- Perron with the Vegas Golden Knights in 2018
- Born: May 28, 1988 (age 38) Sherbrooke, Quebec, Canada
- Height: 6 ft 0 in (183 cm)
- Weight: 202 lb (92 kg; 14 st 6 lb)
- Position: Left wing
- Shoots: Right
- NHL team Former teams: Dallas Stars; St. Louis Blues; Edmonton Oilers; Pittsburgh Penguins; Anaheim Ducks; Vegas Golden Knights; Detroit Red Wings; Ottawa Senators
- NHL draft: 26th overall, 2007; St. Louis Blues
- Playing career: 2007–present

David Perron (born May 28, 1988) is a Canadian professional ice hockey player who is a left winger for the Dallas Stars of the National Hockey League (NHL).

Growing up in Sherbrooke, Quebec, Perron played his junior hockey for the Lewiston Maineiacs of the Quebec Major Junior Hockey League where he led them to the 2006 President's Cup. As a result of his play, Perron was drafted in the first round, 26th overall, by the St. Louis Blues in the 2007 NHL entry draft. He began his professional career with the Blues organization before being traded to the Edmonton Oilers in 2013. His short stint in Edmonton was met with a myriad of injuries which also prohibited him from participating in the 2014 World Championship. After two years with the Oilers, Perron was traded to the Pittsburgh Penguins and Anaheim Ducks before returning to St. Louis in 2016. He was left unprotected by the team for the 2017 NHL expansion draft and was selected by the Vegas Golden Knights for their inaugural season. Perron had a career-high season with the Golden Knights and returned to St. Louis for the third time where he won the Stanley Cup in 2019. He initially joined Detroit in 2022, the first free agent contract of his career not signed with St. Louis; he then signed with the Ottawa Senators two seasons later, before being traded back to Detroit in 2026.

== Playing career ==
=== Early career ===
Perron was born on May 28, 1988, in Sherbrooke, Quebec to parents François Perron and Brigitte Labrecque. Growing up in Sherbrooke, Perron played in the 2001 and 2002 Quebec International Pee-Wee Hockey Tournaments with minor ice hockey teams from his hometown. Although he was eligible to be drafted into the Quebec Major Junior Hockey League's midget draft, Perron was overlooked twice before being selected in 2006. He played with the Saint-Jérôme Panthers in the Quebec Junior AAA Hockey League during his first year of NHL draft eligibility where he recorded 69 points in 51 games. Despite his performance, Perron was never interviewed by any NHL teams and went undrafted in 2006.

Perron then had an excellent rookie season in the Quebec Major Junior Hockey League (QMJHL), leading the Lewiston Maineiacs in scoring with 39 goals and 83 points in 70 games played. His increase in scoring caught the attention of NHL scouts and he was ranked 10th over all 2007 draft-eligible North American skaters by the National Hockey League (NHL)'s Central Scouting Bureau. He helped lead the Maineiacs to their first President's Cup in franchise history and participated in the Memorial Cup. During their Memorial Cup run, Perron was the team's second leading goal scorer with 12 goals and 16 assists.

=== Professional ===
==== St. Louis Blues (2007–2013) ====
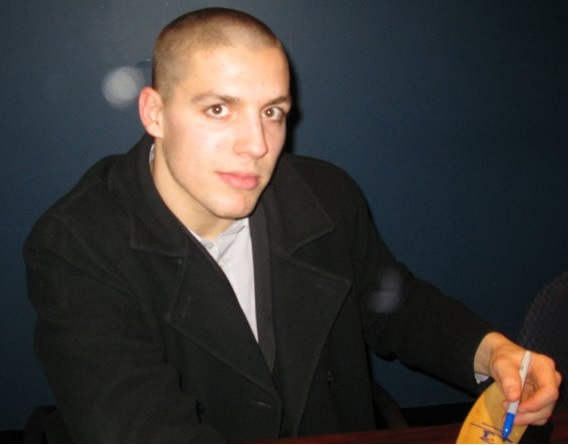
Perron in 2010

Perron was selected in the first round, 26th overall, by the St. Louis Blues in the 2007 NHL entry draft. On the day of his draft, Perron told reporters that he "had every intention of making the team at training camp." He signed a three-year entry-level contract with the team on September 5, 2007, after St. Louis Blues President John Davidson praised his "tremendous creativity and offensive skill." In October, it was confirmed that Perron would start the season with the Blues after an impressive training camp.

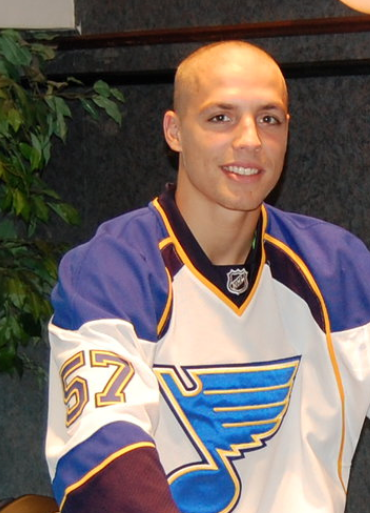
Perron in 2010

Due to the language differences in St. Louis versus Quebec, Perron did not set up his bank account or cash cheques from training camp, resulting in coach Andy Murray helping him set up his first bank account and credit card. He also showed up to Blues practice with white skates, which Murray then ordered the equipment staff to paint black. Upon making his NHL debut during the 2007–08 season, he subsequently became the fifth youngest skater in Blues history at 19 years, 137 days old. On November 3, 2007, Perron scored his first career NHL goal during a 3–2 loss against the Chicago Blackhawks. His goal came during the first period off of a pass from Doug Weight and after review of the play, he helped the Blues tie the game. He finished his rookie season with 13 goals and 27 points in 62 games and was named to the 2008 NHL YoungStars Game.

Perron rejoined the Blues for the 2008–09 pre-season during which he recorded a hat-trick to lift the Blues 9–2 over the Atlanta Thrashers. He impressed Davidson and assistant general manager (GM) Doug Armstrong during training camp who praised his work ethic and perseverance. Davidson spoke highly of Perron's efforts by saying "You know that I can tell with David Perron ... he wants it as bad as anybody in the NHL...Now that he's made the NHL, he wants to come back and prove that he can play at another level. The passion that that kid has is special." This season proved to be his most successful at the time and by January, Perron had recorded a team-leading 24 assists and earned a spot on the sophomore team at the NHL YoungStars Game. Coach Murray would often place Perron with young players like Patrik Berglund and T. J. Oshie to form the Kid Line which was used to boost the energy of the game. He concluded his sophomore campaign placing third on the team in scoring as he helped lead the Blues to the 2009 Stanley Cup playoffs. During their playoff run, Perron recorded two points in four games as they lost to the Vancouver Canucks in the Western Conference quarter final.

After attending the Blues' training camp, Perron was selected for their 2009–10 opening night roster. Following his successful sophomore season, expectations were high for Perron to make an impact with the team while playing alongside David Backes and Andy McDonald. He began the season well and scored his first NHL regular season hat trick on November 10, 2009, in a 6–1 win over the Canucks. A few days later during a game against the New York Islanders, Perron skated the puck up the ice and deked around two Islander players to score the fourth goal of the game against Dwayne Roloson. His goal was later voted by fans as the runner-up Best Moment Of the Season. Some teammates preferred to not have Perron on their line because he held on to the puck too long. Veteran Keith Tkachuk would serve as a mentor for him during the season, often having a trainer alert Perron to meet him in a closed-door room in between periods. He concluded his third season with a then-career high 20 goals in 82 games, placing him fourth on the Blues in points scored.

During the summer of 2010, Perron signed a two-year contract worth $4.3 million to stay with the Blues. Armstrong stated that the contract was because "we are expecting David to grow into a complete player at this level." He began his fourth year campaign with a scoring streak of five goals in his first ten games before sustaining a season-ending concussion on November 4. The concussion was the result of an elbow to the temple from San Jose Sharks forward Joe Thornton and he missed 13 months to recover. Thornton received a two-game suspension for the hit and Perron ended his 167 consecutive games played streak. As a result, Perron was unable to join the Blues for the start of their 2011–12 campaign but was medically cleared to play in December. Upon returning to the Blues' lineup, Perron helped them boost their rankings in the Central Division and Western Conference while scoring in four consecutive games. By February, Perron had recorded 24 points in 30 games and was named the third NHL Star of the Week. He finished the regular season recording 42 points in 57 games as the Blues qualified for the 2012 Stanley Cup playoffs.

The Blues met with the San Jose Sharks in the first round the Stanley Cup playoffs whom they beat in five games. The series winning goal was scored by Perron after deflecting Alex Pietrangelo's shot into the net to break a 1–1 tie with eight minutes remaining. This goal was later voted by Blues fans as the Best Moment of the season. After losing to the Los Angeles Kings, Perron signed a four-year, $15.25 million contract extension with the Blues although the following season would be his last. In his final season with the team, Perron failed to maintain the same scoring level from the previous season and only recorded 10 goals in 48 games. Under new head coach Ken Hitchcock, Perron was often relegated to the fourth line or made a healthy scratch for being too aggressive in the offensive zone and racking up penalty minutes. They would often disagree on plays, and Perron admitted that he was a "very difficult coach."

==== Edmonton Oilers (2013–2015) ====
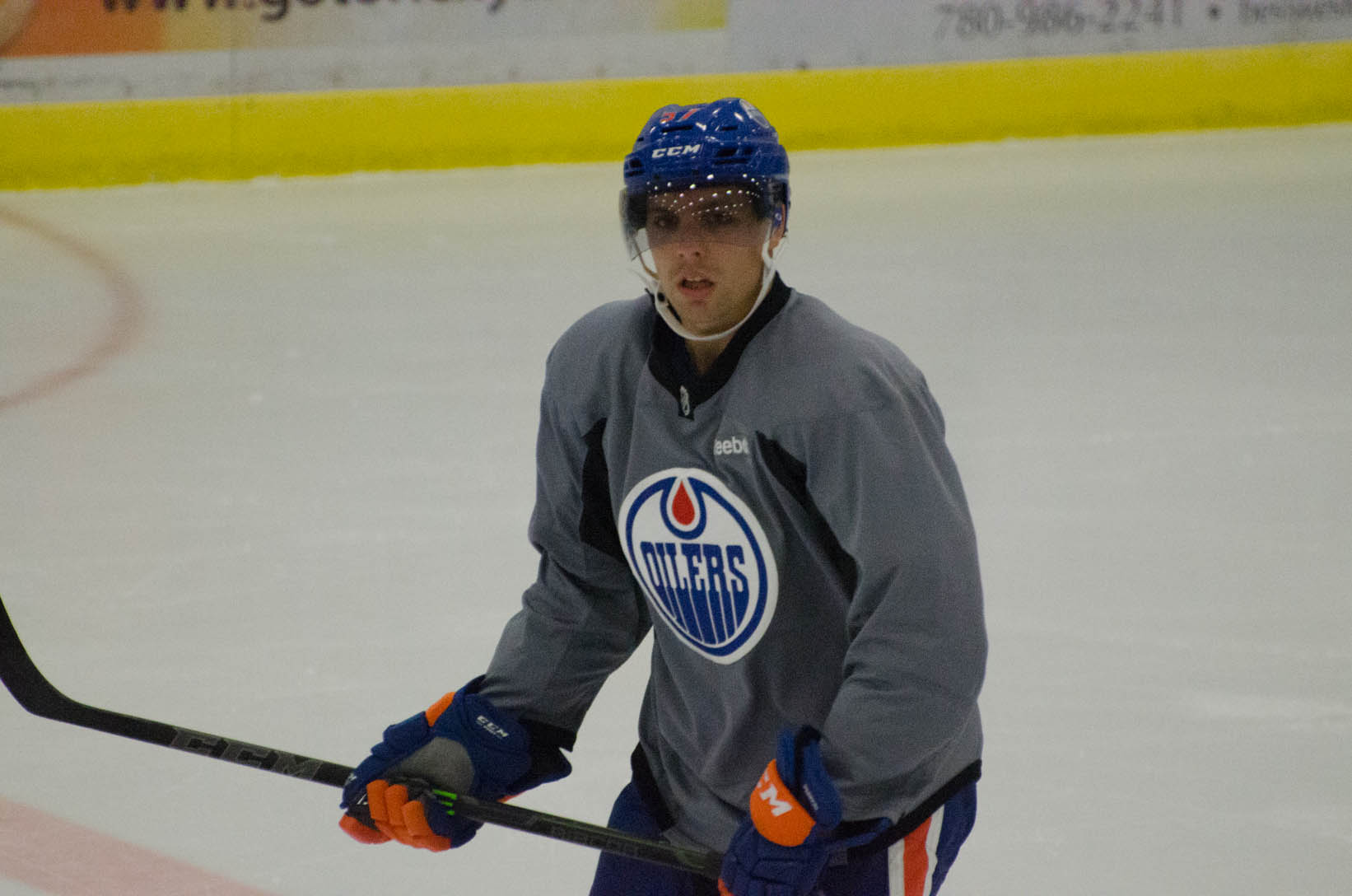
Perron with the Edmonton Oilers in September 2014

On July 10, 2013, Perron was traded to the Edmonton Oilers in exchange for Magnus Pääjärvi and a 2014 second-round pick. When speaking of the trade, Oilers coach Dallas Eakins praised Perron by saying "I love his competitiveness...As much skill as he has, he's got that little bit of nasty in him." General manager Craig MacTavish said he expected to use Perron on the left wing with Jordan Eberle or Nail Yakupov and play on their penalty kill. Through three preseason games, Perron recorded three goals and four points. He was named to the Oilers opening night roster where he played in 13 consecutive games before missing one due to an illness. Upon returning to the lineup, he fell ill again and underwent an MRI due to pain in his neck. Perron ended up missing four games before returning to the ice on November 7 against the Philadelphia Flyers. In his first season with the club, Perron played alongside Jordan Eberle and tied him for team lead in goals. In May, he was named to Canada national team roster for the 2014 World Championship but was forced to decline due to an injury.

In his second and final year with Edmonton, Perron started late due to a hip injury. He began training in August and was paired with Leon Draisaitl and Mark Arcobello during the regular season. The Oilers began the season with a 6–12–2 record and two five game losing streaks by November. Perron actively voiced his frustrations about the loses by saying "something has to change...when you are making those mistakes, something needs to happen. They are the same mistakes we were doing last year. We keep talking about how much better we are this year, but for me it is the same record now that we had last year. It is not better."

==== Pittsburgh Penguins (2015–2016) ====
On January 2, 2015, Perron was traded to the Pittsburgh Penguins in exchange for Rob Klinkhammer and a 2015 first-round pick. When speaking of the trade, he said "After a few years you just want to win... Obviously it's not going to happen this year in Edmonton." At the time of the trade, Perron had recorded 19 points in 38 games. He made his debut a night later, scoring the Penguins' lone goal in a 4–1 loss to the Montreal Canadiens. When reflecting on his debut, during which he played alongside Sidney Crosby, Perron said "I was probably the happiest guy in hockey that day." From there, he recorded five goals in his next six games with the team, tying his amount with Edmonton. However, his streak ended and he went goalless in the last 12 games of the season and first round of the 2015 Stanley Cup playoffs. After the Penguins were eliminated, Perron revealed that he had been playing with a rib injury since their final regular season game against the Buffalo Sabres.

During the summer prior to the 2015–16 season, Perron began power skating training in Montreal and various Ironman Triathlon competitions in Mont-Tremblant. In September while attending training camp, Perron declared that "It's great to feel good again and feel 100 percent." As a result of his off-season training, Perron was paired alongside Sidney Crosby and Phil Kessel on the Penguin's first line, which he called "a great opportunity." Perron also changed his jersey number from 39 to 57, which he had worn on previous teams, and offered the first 57 fans who brought back their old Perron jerseys to the Consol Energy Center a new one for free. Following camp, Perron began the season often skating on the Penguins second line.

==== Anaheim Ducks (2016) ====
On January 16, 2016, Perron and Adam Clendening were traded to the Anaheim Ducks in exchange for Carl Hagelin. At the time of the trade, Perron had recorded 16 points in 43 games with 28 penalty minutes. Often playing alongside Ryan Getzlaf, Perron recorded 14 points in his first 15 games with the team and led the league in Plus–minus. By the time he suffered a shoulder injury in a game a Winnipeg Jets in March, Perron recorded 20 points in 28 games, surpassing his total with Pittsburgh. His hot start slowed down on March 20 after it was announced that he was expected to miss four to six weeks to recover from a separated shoulder. During his recovery period, Perron worked out with fellow injured teammate Kevin Bieksa before they both returned to the Ducks lineup prior to the 2016 Stanley Cup playoffs.

During game one of the Stanley Cup playoffs against the Nashville Predators, Perron continued to play alongside Ryan Getzlaf and right winger Chris Stewart. He ended the game with his second-highest amount of minutes on the ice with 18:25 minutes as the Ducks lost 3–2. After the game, Perron said his injury had affected his playmaking abilities: "Having not played together for a little while, and me being a half-step behind can make a big difference. I thought the game was extremely fast early on. Again, to jump right into the playoffs isn't easy, but it was a fun, emotional game." He eventually bounced back and helped the Ducks lead their series 3–2 by scoring his first goal of the postseason 22 seconds after Ryan Johansen in game five. After losing to the Predators in game seven, coach Bruce Boudreau was fired and Perron became an unrestricted free agent.

==== Return to St. Louis (2016–2017) ====
On July 1, 2016, Perron signed a two-year, $7.5 million contract to return to the Blues. Armstrong commented on Perron's return by saying "he's coming back as a much more mature player on and off the ice, and we're going to be the benefactors of that." Perron also met with the management of the Montreal Canadiens during the summer who offered him a one-year contract compared to St. Louis' two years. He shared his disappointment with Réseau des sports on the turnout, saying it was a dream for him to play in Montreal one day.

Perron subsequently began the 2016–17 season with the Blues after attending their training camp. Although he began the season going pointless in the first six games, he recorded his third career hat trick on October 23 in a 6–4 win over the Calgary Flames. Perron spent the remainder of the season on the Blues' second line as the team qualified for the 2017 Stanley Cup playoffs. They beat the Minnesota Wild in five games before losing to the Nashville Predators in the second round. During their playoff berth against the Predators, Perron was occasionally benched due to taking too many unnecessary penalties. He ended the postseason with one point in 11 games.

==== Vegas Golden Knights (2017–2018) ====
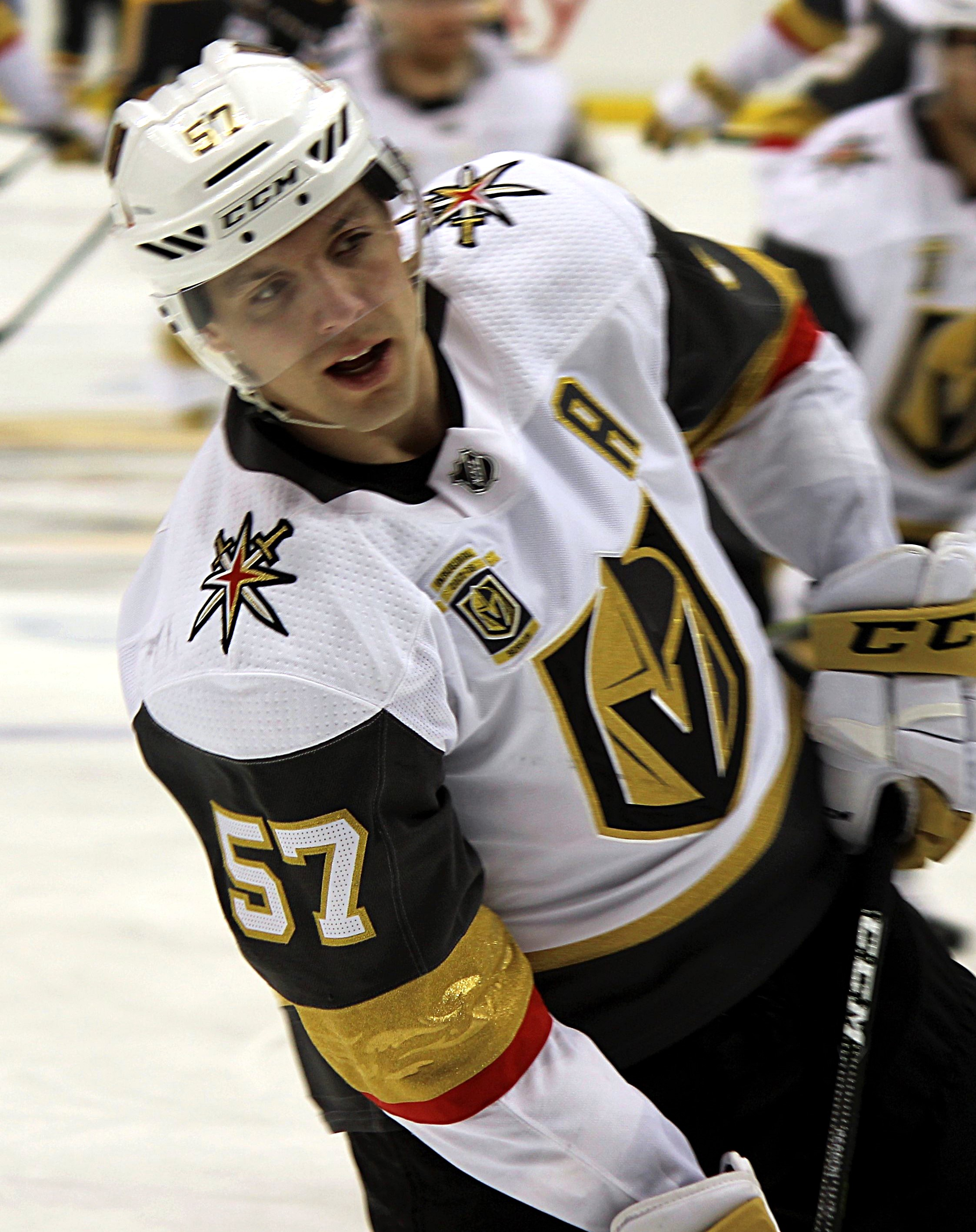
Perron with the Golden Knights during their inaugural season

On June 21, 2017, Perron's stint with the Blues was cut short as he was left unprotected and selected by the Vegas Golden Knights at the 2017 NHL expansion draft. NHL analyst Pierre McGuire praised their selection of Perron by saying "there's no question if you're going to be successful and you're Las Vegas, you need guys that can score, David Perron is one of those guys."

Perron began the 2017–18 season with the Golden Knights for their inaugural season but suffered an upper-body injury during a game against the San Jose Sharks on November 24. At the time of his injury, Perron was the second leading points scorer for the team with six goals and 19 points. He was activated off injured reserve by the Golden Knights on December 8, 2017, after missing six games. In spite of his injury, Perron recorded a career-high 66 points in 70 games as the Golden Knights qualified for the 2018 Stanley Cup playoffs. When questioned on the Golden Knights success, Perron replied that "every guy in our room has a chip on his shoulder...and every time we step on the ice it's a fight to prove our worth."

During the Golden Knights post-season berth, Perron recorded nine points in 15 games. He proved to be an asset to the team as they became the third expansion squad in league history to advance to the Stanley Cup Final in its inaugural season. The Golden Knights competed against the Washington Capitals before eventually losing the series in five games. During the game, Perron and teammate Reilly Smith scored goals in the second period to take the lead 3–2 but Washington scored the winning goal at 12:23 of the third period. As a free agent, Perron chose to return to St. Louis for a third time by signing a four-year, $16 million contract. When reflecting on his career-high season, Perron called it the "best year of his life" and he remained friends with various members from the team.

==== Third stint in St. Louis (2018–2022) ====
For the third time in his career, Perron returned to the St. Louis Blues for another season. Coach Mike Yeo spoke highly of Perron pending his return to the city by saying "bottom line is he's here because he's a good NHL player...the track record is there. He did it with us two years ago. He did it last year in Vegas, and I think it makes us stronger from top to bottom." At the beginning of the season, Perron recorded his fourth career hat trick during a 5–3 win over the Calgary Flames. On January 31, 2019, Perron suffered an upper-body injury and was placed on the team's long term Injured reserve list. Due to his injury, the Blues recalled Jordan Kyrou as his replacement until he was activated off injured reserve on March 16, 2019. After recording 46 points in 57 regular-season games, Perron helped the Blues advance in the standings and qualify for the 2019 Stanley Cup playoffs where they beat the Winnipeg Jets, Dallas Stars, San Jose Sharks to advance to the 2019 Stanley Cup Final.

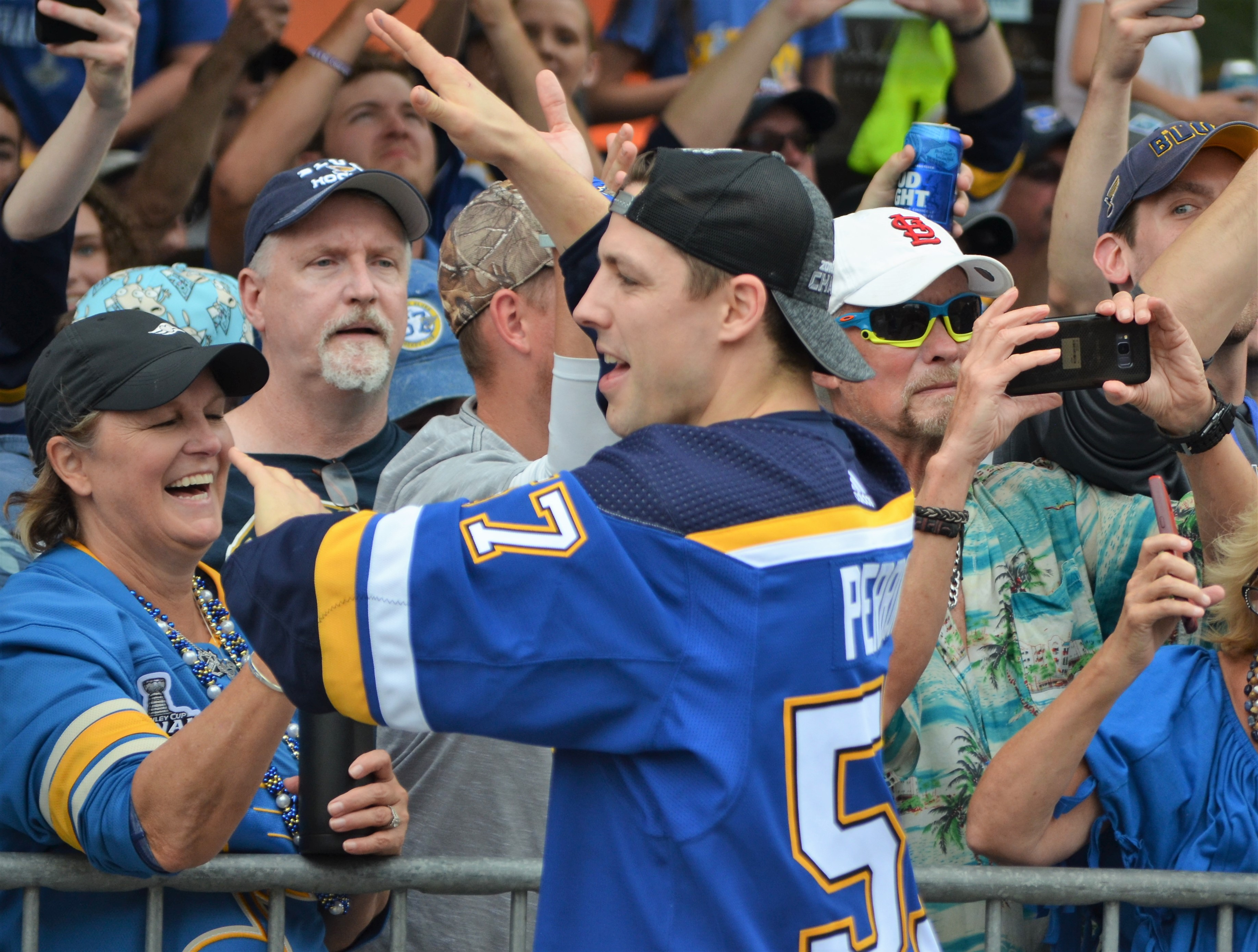
Perron during the 2019 Stanley Cup parade

When the Stanley Cup Final series with the Boston Bruins was tied 2–2, Perron recorded the game-winning goal in game five as the result of a contested non-called tripping penalty. When asked of the missed call after the game, NHL's director of officiating Stephen Walkom said "we don't make comments on judgment calls within games. There are hundreds of judgment calls in every game. The official on the play, he viewed it and he didn't view it as a penalty at the time. The Blues would go on to win the series in seven games following a 4–1 win. Upon winning the Stanley Cup for the first time in his career, Perron brought it to his hometown of Sherbrooke.

During the shortened 2019–20 season, Perron recorded his fifth career hat trick during a 5-2 win over the Colorado Avalanche. Due to his successful start to the season, Perron was listed as a “Last Man standing” option at the 2020 National Hockey League All-Star Game, allowing fans to vote him into the competition. At the time of voting, Perron had recorded 18 goals and 44 points, on track to best his career high of goals. In an effort to encourage fans to vote, Blues goaltender Jordan Binnington said in an interview, "he's playing some of the best hockey I’ve ever seen him play. He's working well with the boys, the boys love him, and it would be great to have him here that week." On January 11, 2020, Perron was voted into the All-Star Game along with Toronto's Mitch Marner, Vancouver's Quinn Hughes, and Washington's T. J. Oshie. He competed in the NHL Shooting Stars challenge where he ended with a four-way tie for fifth place. He returned to the Blues lineup following the break before it was paused due to the COVID-19 pandemic. At the time the league paused play, Perron placed only behind Ryan O'Reilly in team points and led the league in overtime goals.

On May 3, 2021, Perron assisted on an empty-net goal by Ryan O'Reilly near the end of his 900th game in the NHL, his 600th as a St Louis Blue, to record his 600th career point and his 400th with St. Louis, reaching four milestones in the same game.

==== Detroit Red Wings (2022–2024) ====
On July 13, 2022, Perron signed a two-year, $9.5 million contract with the Detroit Red Wings. This was the first time in Perron's career he had signed an NHL contract with a team other than the Blues.

==== Ottawa Senators (2024–2026) ====
On July 1, 2024, Perron signed as a free agent to a two-year, $8 million contract with the Ottawa Senators.

==== Return to Detroit (2026) ====
On March 5, 2026, Perron was traded back to the Red Wings, in exchange for a conditional 2026 fourth-round pick.

==== Dallas Stars (2026–present) ====
On October 16, 2026, Perron signed a one-year, $850,000 contract with the Dallas Stars.

== Personal life ==
Perron and his wife Vanessa Vandal, an interior designer, have four children together. Vandal has also been a star on the show Hockey Wives, which covers her pregnancies and decision to return to school for interior design. The family resides in Chesterfield, Missouri with their two dogs, Jack and Stella, and their calico cat, Alice. During the off-season, Perron enjoys time at the lake on his boat.

Throughout his time in the NHL, Perron has been active in various charities and fundraisers. In 2016, he established the David Perron Attitude Hockey Foundation hockey tournament in Brompton. He recruited various Quebec born hockey players to participate with the aim of providing "role models for young hockey players." He has also contributed as an ambassador to the Athletes for Animals Foundation and coordinated a weekend charity tournament with Kris Letang in 2018.

== Career statistics ==
			Regular season					Playoffs
Season	Team	League	GP	G	A	Pts	PIM	GP	G	A	Pts	PIM
2005–06	Saint-Jérôme Panthers	QJAHL	51	24	45	69	92	—	—	—	—	—
2006–07	Lewiston Maineiacs	QMJHL	70	39	44	83	75	17	12	16	28	22
2007–08	St. Louis Blues	NHL	62	13	14	27	38	—	—	—	—	—
2008–09	St. Louis Blues	NHL	81	15	35	50	50	4	1	1	2	4
2009–10	St. Louis Blues	NHL	82	20	27	47	60	—	—	—	—	—
2010–11	St. Louis Blues	NHL	10	5	2	7	12	—	—	—	—	—
2011–12	St. Louis Blues	NHL	57	21	21	42	19	9	1	4	5	10
2012–13	St. Louis Blues	NHL	48	10	15	25	44	6	0	2	2	6
2013–14	Edmonton Oilers	NHL	78	28	29	57	90	—	—	—	—	—
2014–15	Edmonton Oilers	NHL	38	5	14	19	20	—	—	—	—	—
2014–15	Pittsburgh Penguins	NHL	43	12	10	22	42	5	0	1	1	4
2015–16	Pittsburgh Penguins	NHL	43	4	12	16	28	—	—	—	—	—
2015–16	Anaheim Ducks	NHL	28	8	12	20	34	7	1	2	3	8
2016–17	St. Louis Blues	NHL	82	18	28	46	54	11	0	1	1	8
2017–18	Vegas Golden Knights	NHL	70	16	50	66	50	15	1	8	9	10
2018–19	St. Louis Blues	NHL	57	23	23	46	46	26	7	9	16	16
2019–20	St. Louis Blues	NHL	71	25	35	60	52	9	4	5	9	8
2020–21	St. Louis Blues	NHL	56	19	39	58	22	—	—	—	—	—
2021–22	St. Louis Blues	NHL	67	27	30	57	48	12	9	4	13	10
2022–23	Detroit Red Wings	NHL	82	24	32	56	52	—	—	—	—	—
2023–24	Detroit Red Wings	NHL	76	17	30	47	55	—	—	—	—	—
2024–25	Ottawa Senators	NHL	43	9	7	16	12	6	2	1	3	4
2025–26	Ottawa Senators	NHL	40	10	15	25	22	—	—	—	—	—
2025–26	Detroit Red Wings	NHL	16	3	0	3	18	—	—	—	—	—
NHL totals			1,239	332	480	812	877	110	26	38	64	88

== Awards and honours ==
Award	Year	Refs
NHL
NHL YoungStars Game	2008	
Stanley Cup champion	2019	
All-Star Game	2020	

Awards and achievements
Preceded by Ian Cole	St. Louis Blues first-round draft pick 2007	Succeeded by Alex Pietrangelo
