= Benoit Doucet =

Canadian-German ice hockey player and coach

- Born: April 23, 1963 (age 62) Montreal, Quebec, Canada
- Height: 5 ft 9 in (175 cm)
- Weight: 183 lb (83 kg; 13 st 1 lb)
- Position: Centre
- Shot: Left
- Played for: Moncton Golden Flames; EV Landshut; EHC Olten; Düsseldorfer EG; Kölner Haie
- National team: Germany
- Playing career: 1985–1999

Benoit Doucet (born April 23, 1963) is a Canadian-German ice hockey coach and a former professional player.

He spent most of his professional playing career in Germany and represented the German Men's National Team at the 1994 and 1998 Olympic Games and three World Championships. He is currently the head coach of ESV Waldkirchen in Germany.

== Playing career ==
Doucet played for the Hull Olympiques in the junior league QMJHL alongside John Chabot and Sylvain Turgeon and then spent the 1984-85 season at the Université de Moncton.

He went undrafted, but was invited to the Calgary Flames training camp in 1985 and made 79 AHL appearances for Calgary's affiliate Moncton Golden Flames in the 1985-86 season. Doucet never landed a spot on the Flames' NHL roster and after competing in the Canadian National Team system in 1986-87, he left North America to pursue a career in Europe. This proved to be a decision that he would never regret, Doucet said years later.

He spent his first two years in Germany in the country's second division with Duisburger SC and ECD Sauerland, displaying his scoring prowess: For Duisburg, Doucet registered 43 goals and 51 assists in 27 games through the 1988-89 season and then broke his own record the following season: He was virtually unstoppable as he totaled 67 goals and 60 assists in 33 games for the Iserlohn-based team.

Doucet's impact in Germany's second division led to strong interest from teams of the country's top-tier. He signed with EV Landshut in 1990 and continued his high-scoring ways in Germany's top division, tallying 45 goals and 42 assists in 43 contests.

Prior to the 1991-92 season, Doucet inked a contract with Düsseldorfer EG, the team that swept all before them in German ice hockey in the early 1990s. He won German championships with DEG in 92, 93 and 96 and played a total of 280 Bundesliga/DEL games for the Düsseldorf team, recording 136 goals and 198 assists. One of the great moments of his career came in game five of the 1993 finals between arch rivals DEG and Kölner Haie, when Doucet scored the game-winner in overtime to give Düsseldorf their fourth straight title.

Doucet retired in 1998, but made a brief comeback in 1998-99, playing six games for Kölner Haie and ten games for second-division side Grefrather EV. After winding down his playing career, he returned to his native Quebec.

== International career ==
Doucet received German citizenship in the early 90s. He played for the German Men's National Team at the 1994 and 1998 Olympic Games, attended three World Championships and the 1996 World Cup of Hockey.

== Coaching career ==
He worked as a coach at hockey academies in Canada and was named head coach of German DEL2 side Fischtown Pinguins on June 3, 2015. He was sacked by the Pinguins on January 25, 2016 despite sitting in second place in the DEL2. In 2020, he took over the coaching job at ESV Waldkirchen in the German minor league Landesliga. In June 2022, Doucet was named head coach of German Landesliga side EV Moosburg. In 2023, he went back to Waldkirchen. He parted ways with the team in July 2024.

== Career statistics ==
=== Regular season and playoffs ===
			Regular season					Playoffs
Season	Team	League	GP	G	A	Pts	PIM	GP	G	A	Pts	PIM
1979–80	Lac St-Louis Lions	QMAAA	42	42	42	84	41	5	3	7	10
1980–81	Hull Olympiques	QMJHL	70	25	38	63	47	—	—	—	—	—
1981–82	Hull Olympiques	QMJHL	62	35	65	100	40	14	10	16	26	4
1982–83	Hull Olympiques	QMJHL	68	61	76	137	53	7	8	8	16	8
1983–84	Lausanne HC	SUI.2
1984–85	University of Moncton	AUS	24	19	22	41	0	—	—	—	—	—
1985–86	Moncton Golden Flames	AHL	79	26	34	60	18	10	3	2	5	7
1986–87	Canadian National Team	Intl	63	27	31	58	86	—	—	—	—	—
1986–87	Moncton Golden Flames	AHL	—	—	—	—	—	5	0	3	3	17
1988–89	Duisburger SV	FRG.2	43	86	94	180	78	—	—	—	—	—
1989–90	ECD Sauerland	FRG.2	51	94	78	172	117	—	—	—	—	—
1990–91	EV Landshut	1.GBun	43	45	42	87	82	5	9	7	16	12
1991–92	Düsseldorfer EG	1.GBun	44	24	34	58	37	9	6	6	12	13
1992–93	Düsseldorfer EG	1.GBun	17	3	5	8	13	11	6	9	15	10
1993–94	Düsseldorfer EG	1.GBun	44	24	25	49	61	11	3	4	7	16
1994–95	Düsseldorfer EG	DEL	39	24	33	57	66	10	5	5	10	26
1995–96	Düsseldorfer EG	DEL	46	30	33	63	84	13	2	11	13	34
1996–97	Düsseldorfer EG	DEL	46	19	30	49	66	4	1	2	3	8
1997–98	Düsseldorfer EG	DEL	45	12	41	53	67	3	0	1	1	8
1998–99	Grefrather EV	GER.2	10	2	7	9	32	—	—	—	—	—
1998–99	Kölner Haie	DEL	6	0	1	1	6	—	—	—	—	—
1.GBun totals			148	96	106	202	193	36	24	26	50	51
DEL totals			182	85	138	223	289	30	8	19	27	76

=== International ===
Year	Team	Event	GP	G	A	Pts	PIM
1993	Germany	WC	6	1	3	4	6
1994	Germany	OG	8	3	0	3	15
1995	Germany	WC	5	3	0	3	6
1996	Germany	WC	6	1	0	1	18
1996	Germany	WCH	4	1	0	1	2
1997	Germany	OGQ	3	1	2	3	12
1998	Germany	OG	4	0	0	0	6
Senior totals			36	10	5	15	65
