= Marc-André Cliche =

Canadian ice hockey player

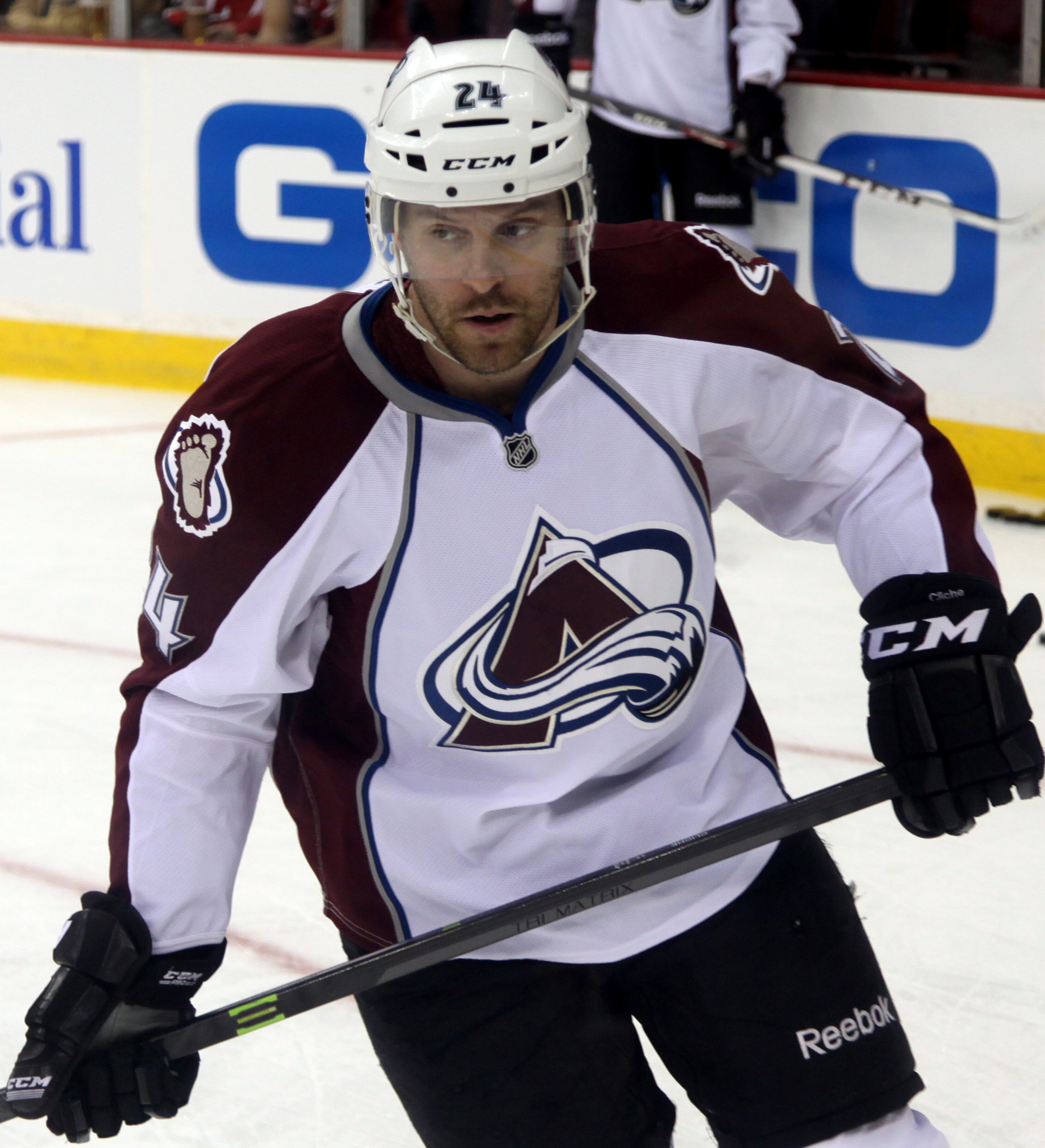
- Cliche with the Colorado Avalanche in November 2014
- Born: March 23, 1987 (age 39) Rouyn-Noranda, Quebec, Canada
- Height: 6 ft 0 in (183 cm)
- Weight: 205 lb (93 kg; 14 st 9 lb)
- Position: Centre
- Shot: Right
- Played for: Los Angeles Kings; Colorado Avalanche
- NHL draft: 56th overall, 2005; New York Rangers
- Playing career: 2007–2017

Marc-André Cliche (born March 23, 1987) is a Canadian former professional ice hockey centre. He played in the National Hockey League (NHL) with the Los Angeles Kings and the Colorado Avalanche.

== Playing career ==
As a youth, Cliche played in the 2000 and 2001 Quebec International Pee-Wee Hockey Tournaments with minor ice hockey teams from Rouyn-Noranda and Val-d'Or.

Cliche was drafted in the second round, 56th overall, by the New York Rangers in the 2005 NHL entry draft. He was drafted from the QMJHL where he played with the Lewiston Maineiacs for four years. In his final junior season, Cliche was selected and played for Canada at the 2007 World Junior Ice Hockey Championships.

On February 5, 2007, Cliche was traded by the Rangers to the Los Angeles Kings along with Jason Ward and Jan Marek for Sean Avery and John Seymour. He was then signed to a three-year entry-level contract with the Kings on April 9, 2007. Cliche made his professional debut in the 2007–08 season with the Kings affiliate, the Manchester Monarchs. In a season interrupted with injury, Cliche played in 52 games scoring 21 points.

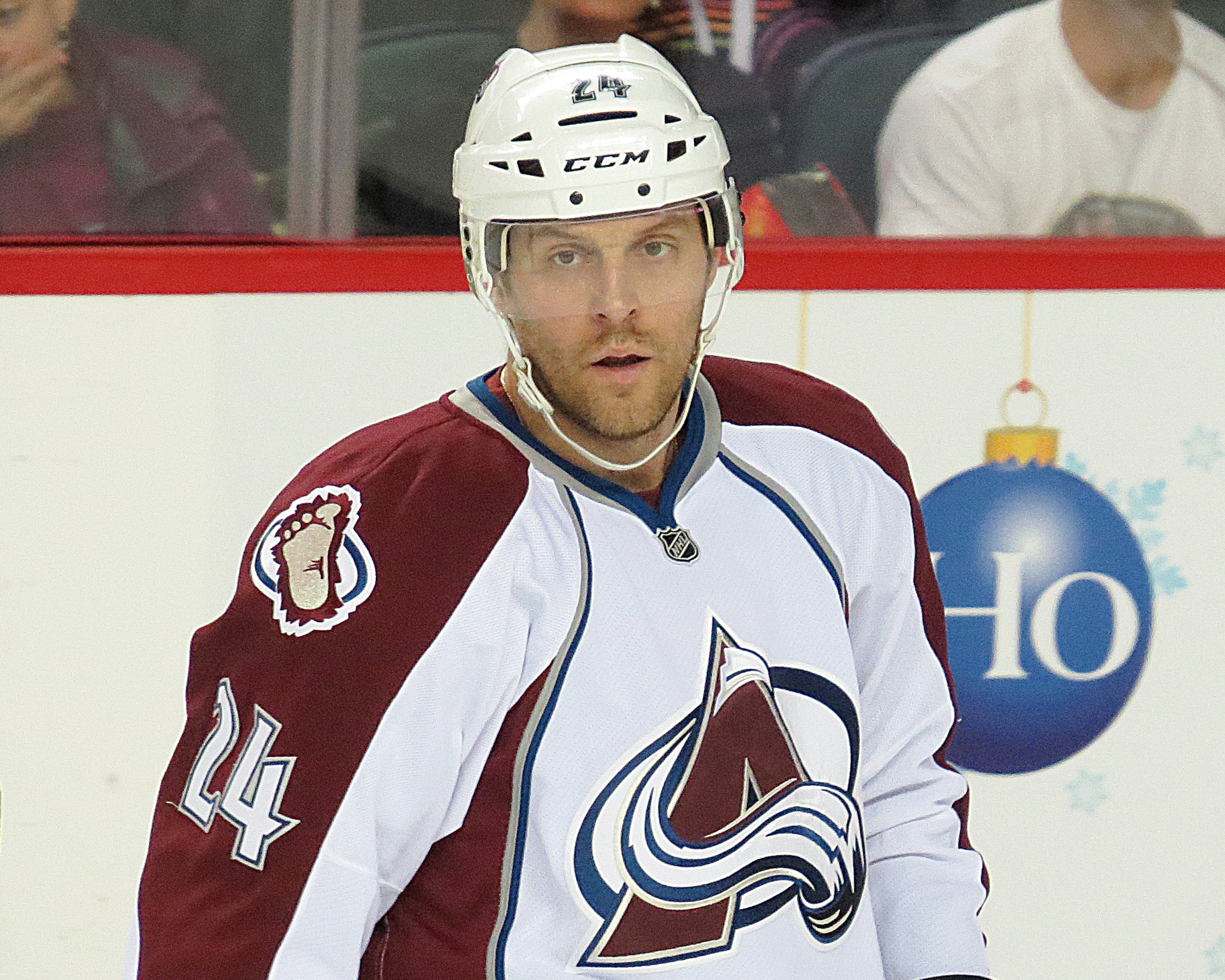
Cliche with the Colorado Avalanche in December 2013

In the 2009–10 season, the last year of his entry-level contract, Cliche was again a mainstay of the Monarchs checking line. On March 2, 2010, he received his first NHL recall and made his debut with the Kings in a solitary game against the Dallas Stars. During the following 2010–11 season, unable to gain a position on the Kings roster, Cliche was selected and served as the Captain of the Manchester Monarchs from October 29, 2010. In the 2011–12 season, Cliche scored a professional high 17 goals and 41 points in 72 games. Although he was recalled as a black ace by the Kings during their playoff run and was with the team when they won the Stanley Cup, he was subsequently scratched from the line-up during the entire series and did not qualify to have his name engraved on the cup.

On June 15, 2012, after five seasons within the Kings organization, becoming a veteran presence among the Monarchs forwards, Cliche extended his tenure in signing a two-year contract extension. He remained with the Monarchs for the following 2012–13 season, scoring 10 goals and 20 points in 52 games. Prior to the 2013–14 season, on September 22, 2013, Cliche placed on waivers by the Kings and claimed by the Colorado Avalanche. With the opportunity given to become the Avalanche's fourth-line centre by head coach Patrick Roy, Cliche played in his first NHL game since 2010 when he contributed with an assist for his first NHL point in a victory over the Nashville Predators on October 4, 2013. After the first month of the season, Cliche established himself as a regular among the penalty kill and fourth line. In his 49th career game, he finally scored his long-awaited first NHL goal in a 7-1 victory on February 1, 2014, against Ryan Miller of the Buffalo Sabres. In leading the Avalanche with time on the penalty kill among forwards, Cliche was rewarded in signing a two-year contract extension to remain with the club on February 27, 2014. He helped the club qualify for the post-season for the first time in 4 years appearing scoreless in 7 playoff games in a series defeat to the Minnesota Wild.

In the 2014–15 season, Cliche retained his fourth-line centre role with the Avalanche, matching his offence from the previous year with 7 points in 74 games as Colorado missed out on the post-season. With the Avalanche looking to rebound in the final year of his contract in 2015–16, Cliche was placed on waivers after Avalanche training camp and returned to the AHL with new AHL affiliate, the San Antonio Rampage, to begin the year. He assumed a leadership role within the Rampage and was unable to earn a recall to the NHL. Cliche regained his scoring touch in the AHL compiling 19 points in 38 games before he was dealt at the trade deadline by the Avalanche to the New York Islanders in exchange for Taylor Beck on February 29, 2016. He was directly assigned to remain in the AHL with the Bridgeport Sound Tigers.

On July 4, 2016, as a free agent, Cliche was unable to garner NHL interest, opting to sign a one-year AHL contract with the Toronto Marlies.

== Career statistics ==
=== Regular season and playoffs ===
			Regular season					Playoffs
Season	Team	League	GP	G	A	Pts	PIM	GP	G	A	Pts	PIM
2002–03	Amos Forestiers	QMAAA	42	26	16	42	18	—	—	—	—	—
2003–04	Lewiston Maineiacs	QMJHL	52	8	10	18	17	7	1	2	3	0
2004–05	Lewiston Maineiacs	QMJHL	19	4	4	8	8	—	—	—	—	—
2005–06	Lewiston Maineiacs	QMJHL	66	37	45	82	60	6	2	2	4	0
2006–07	Lewiston Maineiacs	QMJHL	52	24	30	54	42	16	6	16	22	10
2007–08	Manchester Monarchs	AHL	52	11	10	21	25	4	0	1	1	2
2008–09	Manchester Monarchs	AHL	31	5	4	9	19	—	—	—	—	—
2009–10	Manchester Monarchs	AHL	66	11	14	25	45	12	1	1	2	8
2009–10	Los Angeles Kings	NHL	1	0	0	0	0	—	—	—	—	—
2010–11	Manchester Monarchs	AHL	63	14	21	35	35	—	—	—	—	—
2011–12	Manchester Monarchs	AHL	72	17	24	41	35	4	1	0	1	6
2012–13	Manchester Monarchs	AHL	57	10	10	20	46	3	0	0	0	4
2013–14	Colorado Avalanche	NHL	76	1	6	7	17	7	0	0	0	2
2014–15	Colorado Avalanche	NHL	74	2	5	7	17	—	—	—	—	—
2015–16	San Antonio Rampage	AHL	38	6	13	19	8	—	—	—	—	—
2015–16	Bridgeport Sound Tigers	AHL	6	1	0	1	32	3	2	0	2	0
2016–17	Toronto Marlies	AHL	16	1	2	3	6	—	—	—	—	—
AHL totals			401	76	98	174	251	26	4	2	6	20
NHL totals			151	3	11	14	34	7	0	0	0	2

Medal record

Representing Canada

Ice hockey

World Junior Championships
Gold medal – first place	2007 Mora	

=== International ===
Year	Team	Event	Result	GP	G	A	Pts	PIM
2004	Canada Quebec	U17	3rd place, bronze medalist(s)	6	2	1	3	0
2007	Canada	WJC	1st place, gold medalist(s)	6	0	0	0	4
Junior totals				12	2	1	3	4
