= Kris Letang =

Canadian ice hockey player (born 1987)

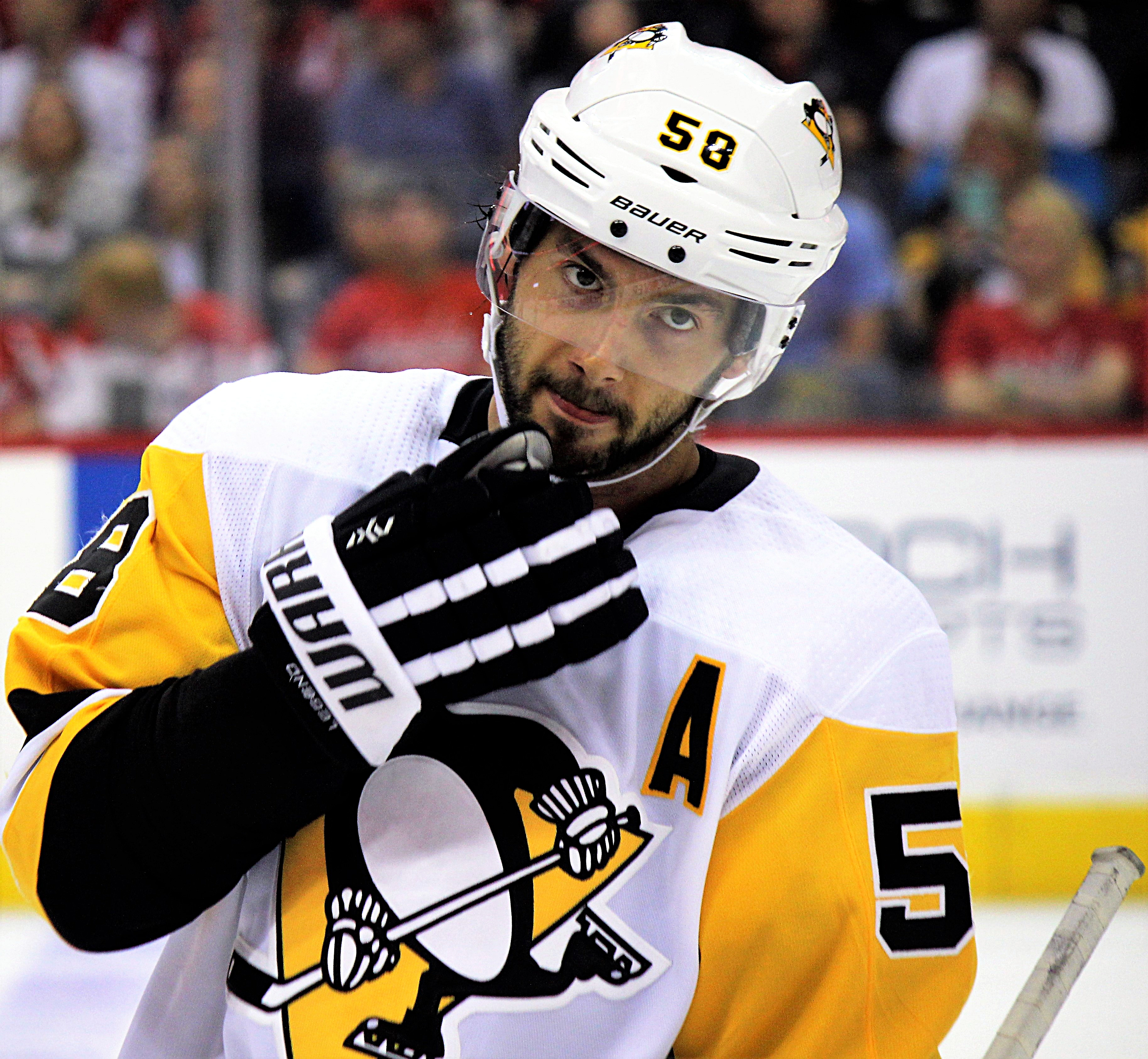
- Letang with the Pittsburgh Penguins in November 2017
- Born: April 24, 1987 (age 39) Montreal, Quebec, Canada
- Height: 6 ft 0 in (183 cm)
- Weight: 199 lb (90 kg; 14 st 3 lb)
- Position: Defence
- Shoots: Right
- NHL team: Pittsburgh Penguins
- NHL draft: 62nd overall, 2005; Pittsburgh Penguins
- Playing career: 2006–present

Kristopher Joseph Pierre Irwin Letang (born April 24, 1987) is a Canadian professional ice hockey player who is a defenceman and alternate captain for the Pittsburgh Penguins of the National Hockey League (NHL). He played juniors in the Quebec Major Junior Hockey League (QMJHL) with Val-d'Or Foreurs for three seasons, during which time he was selected 62nd overall by the Penguins in the 2005 NHL entry draft. In his second full NHL season, Letang won the 2009 Stanley Cup with Pittsburgh. He became a two-time Stanley Cup champion when the Penguins defeated the San Jose Sharks in 2016, and a three-time Stanley Cup champion when the Penguins defeated the Nashville Predators in 2017. Internationally, he has competed for Canada at the under-18 and under-20 levels, winning back-to-back gold medals at the World Junior Championships in 2006 and 2007.

== Playing career ==
Letang played major junior hockey for the Val-d'Or Foreurs of the Quebec Major Junior Hockey League for three seasons. After recording 32 points in his junior rookie season, he was named to the QMJHL and the CHL All-Rookie Team. That summer, he was drafted in the third round, 62nd overall, in the 2005 NHL entry draft by the Pittsburgh Penguins. The next season, a 68-point effort in just 60 games earned him QMJHL First Team All-Star honours.

=== Pittsburgh Penguins (2006–present) ===
==== Early years in Pittsburgh, first Stanley Cup title (2006–2011) ====
Making the Penguins out of training camp, Letang made his NHL debut in the 2006–07 season. He scored his first NHL goal in his third game, against Henrik Lundqvist of the New York Rangers in a 6–5 win. However, after two goals in seven games, Letang was scratched twice and then returned to Val-d'Or for further development. Playing in his third season with Val-d'Or, he led the Foreurs to the 2007 QMJHL Finals with 31 points in the post-season, only to be swept by the Lewiston MAINEiacs in four games. Upon the Foreurs' elimination, he was assigned to the Pittsburgh Penguins' American Hockey League (AHL) affiliate, the Wilkes-Barre/Scranton Penguins, who were in the second round of the Calder Cup playoffs, and recorded an assist in his only game. At season's end, he was the recipient of three major QMJHL awards. In addition to receiving the Emile Bouchard Trophy as the QMJHL's best defenceman and the Paul Dumont Trophy as the best personality, Letang also received the Kevin Lowe Trophy, as the best defensive defenceman, indicative of Letang's abilities on both ends of the ice.

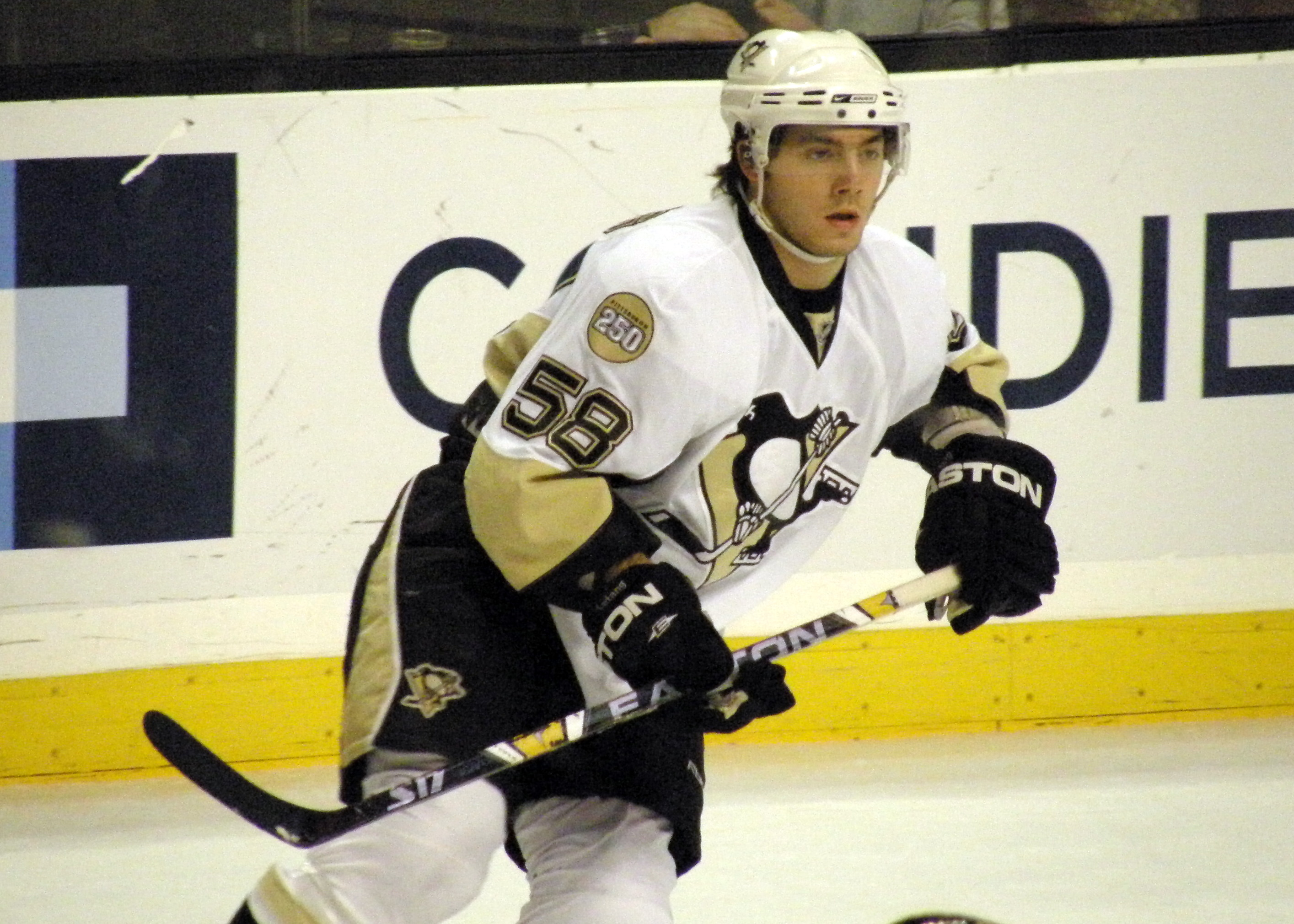
Letang with the Penguins in February 2008

After beginning the 2007–08 season in Wilkes-Barre/Scranton, Letang was quickly recalled by Pittsburgh after recording seven points in ten games in the AHL. Letang excelled in his rookie season with Pittsburgh and was invited to the 2008 NHL YoungStars Game during All-Star weekend, alongside teammate Tyler Kennedy. He completed the season with 17 points in 63 games, sixth among rookie defencemen. Making his Stanley Cup playoffs debut, Letang helped the Penguins to the 2008 Stanley Cup Final, where they were defeated in six games by the Detroit Red Wings.

Entering the 2008–09 season, the Penguins' top two defencemen, Sergei Gonchar and Ryan Whitney, were both put on the long-term injured reserve, immediately increasing Letang's responsibilities on the team's blueline. He was placed on the Penguins top defensive pairing with Brooks Orpik, replacing Gonchar. The increased playing time resulted in a 10-goal, 33-point season, leading all team defencemen. During the season, Letang was also invited to his second NHL YoungStars Game during the 2009 All-Star weekend in his hometown of Montreal, playing for the Sophomores team.

After the Penguins eliminated the Philadelphia Flyers in the first round, Letang scored his first career NHL playoff goal in game three of the second round against the Washington Capitals on May 6, 2009, in overtime. Letang's playing status for the game had been uncertain due to a suspected shoulder injury resulting from a Mike Green hit received in Game 3. Nevertheless, his game-winning goal cut the Capitals' series lead to 2–1, helping Pittsburgh overcome the initial 2–0 series deficit and win in seven games. Advancing to the Finals, they met the Red Wings for the second consecutive year. Letang scored one goal in the series, in Game 3, helping the Penguins defeat the Red Wings in seven games. They won the Stanley Cup on June 12, 2009, winning the deciding game 2–1 at the Joe Louis Arena. Letang finished the post-season with four goals and 13 points over 23 games.

The following season, Letang recorded a career-low three goals to go with 24 assists. Late in the regular season, Letang signed a four-year contract extension through to the 2013–14 season on March 30, 2010, worth an annual salary of $3.5 million. Entering the 2010 playoffs as defending champions and fourth seed in the East, the Penguins were eliminated in the second round by the eighth-seeded Montreal Canadiens after they had defeated the fifth-seeded Ottawa Senators in the first round. Letang surpassed his regular season goals total with five tallies in 13 post-season games, along with two assists for seven points.

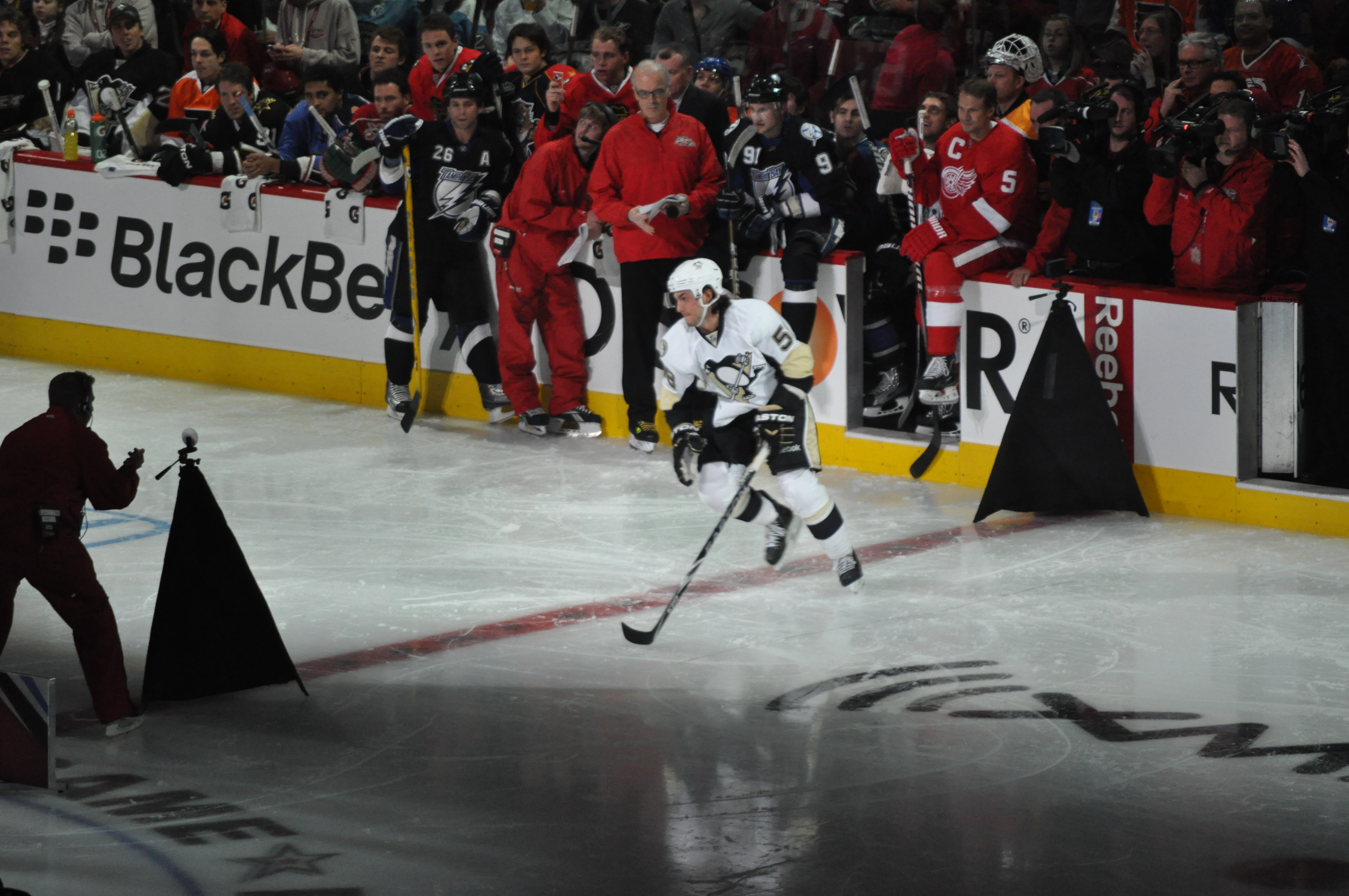
Letang competing in the fastest skater event for the 2011 NHL All-Star Game

With the departure of the Penguins' top defenceman, Sergei Gonchar, the following summer, Letang assumed a larger role with the club in 2010–11. Enjoying a career year, he was voted in as a starter for the 2011 NHL All-Star Game in Raleigh, North Carolina. With a career-high 50 points (eight goals and 42 assists), Letang finished the season as the second-highest scorer for the Penguins, behind Sidney Crosby. His efforts helped the Penguins to the fourth-best record in the NHL with 49 wins and 106 points despite long-term injuries to the team's top three centres – Crosby, Evgeni Malkin and Jordan Staal. Matching up against the Tampa Bay Lightning in the first round, Pittsburgh lost the series in seven games; Letang had four assists.

==== Injury-depleted seasons (2011–2015) ====
On November 26, 2011, Letang suffered a broken nose and a concussion due to receiving an illegal check to the head delivered by Max Pacioretty. Letang remained in the game, and scored the game-winning goal in overtime, but would miss the next 21 games due to injury before returning to the line-up on January 19. On January 23, 2012, Letang made the NHL 2012 All-Star Game roster as an injury replacement for Winnipeg's Dustin Byfuglien, joining teammates Evgeni Malkin and James Neal. He then finished the 2011–12 season with 10 goals and 32 assists for 42 points in 51 games. In their first round loss to the Stanley Cup playoffs against the Philadelphia Flyers, Letang scored one goal and had two assists while earning a game misconduct in Game 3 for fighting Kimmo Timonen.

On January 4, 2013, due to the 2012–13 NHL lockout, Letang signed with SKA Saint Petersburg of the Kontinental Hockey League (KHL). However, Letang did not play in a game for Saint Petersburg, as the NHL lockout ended on January 6. For the 2012–13 season, Letang recorded five goals and 33 assists in 35 games, was named a finalist for the James Norris Memorial Trophy, awarded to the NHL's top defenceman, and was named to the NHL second all-star team.

On July 2, 2013, Letang signed an eight-year contract with Pittsburgh valued at $58 million that went into effect in the 2014–15 season. Letang played in 34 games in the 2013–14 season before it was announced he would miss six weeks after suffering a stroke. On March 16, 2014, Dan Bylsma, then-head coach of the Penguins, announced Letang was cleared by doctors to return to full practice.

Letang's persistence through stroke recovery led to his being a finalist for the Bill Masterton Memorial Trophy for the 2014–15 season. He finished third in voting for the Masterton Trophy, given "to the player who best exemplifies the qualities of perseverance, sportsmanship and dedication to hockey."

==== Back-to-back Stanley Cup titles (2015–2018) ====
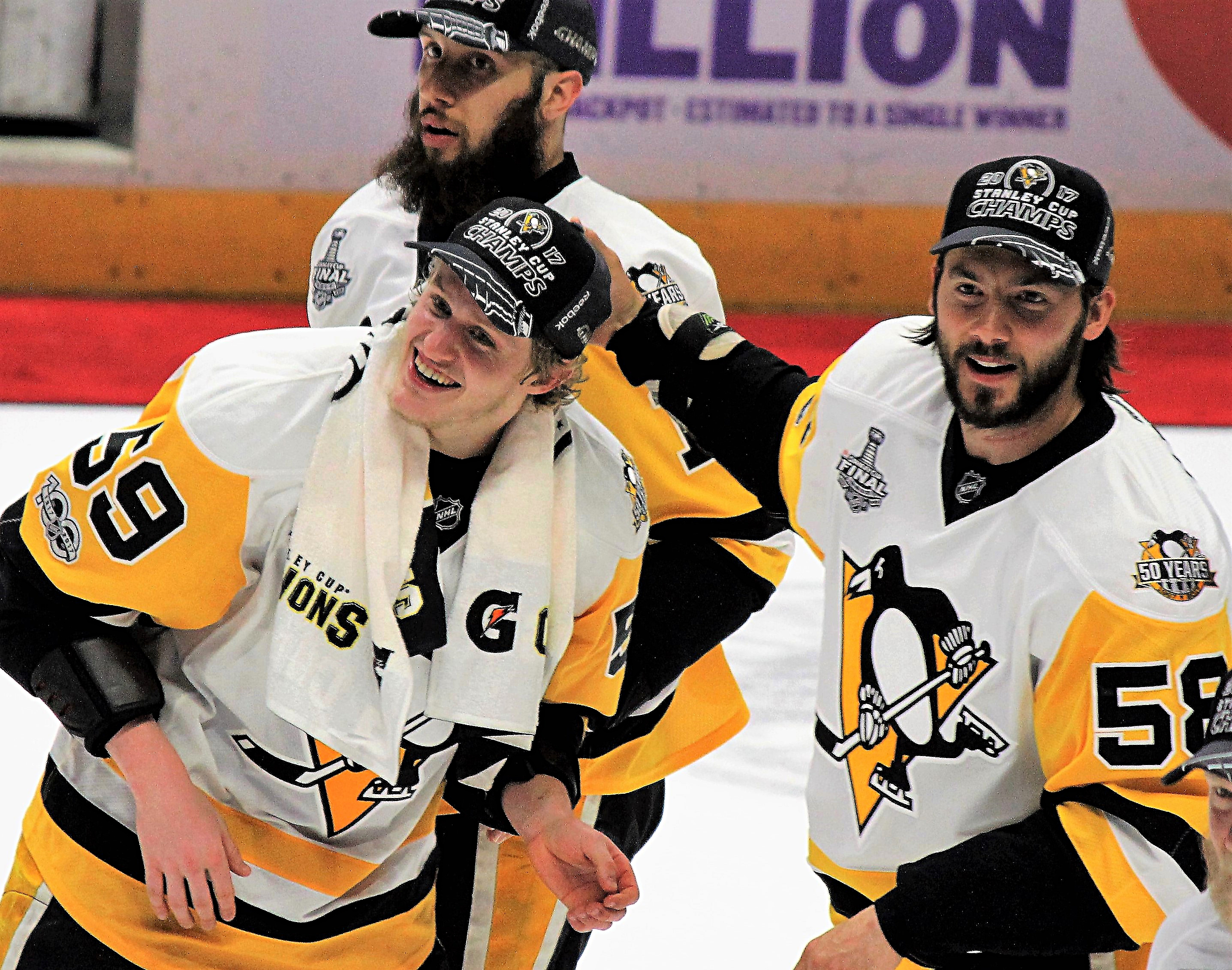
Letang (right foreground) celebrates with Jake Guentzel and Nick Bonino after the Penguins won the 2017 Stanley Cup Final

In the 2015–16 season, Letang was named to play for the Metropolitan Division team in the 2016 NHL All-Star Game. Letang and the Penguins would matchup against the New York Rangers in the first round for the second straight year and a matchup between the two teams for a third consecutive time. On April 19, 2016, in game three of the series, Letang was the subject of a controversial slash to the neck of Rangers' forward Viktor Stålberg. Although he was not injured, the incident resulted in Stålberg losing three teeth. Despite this, Letang was not disciplined by the league or penalized in the game. He would go on to score an empty-net goal against the Rangers as the Penguins won the game 3–1 for a 2–1 series lead. The Penguins would go on to defeat the Rangers in five games before defeating the Presidents' Trophy-winning Washington Capitals in six games in the second round and the Tampa Bay Lightning in seven games in the Eastern Conference Finals, to help the Penguins clinch a spot in the Stanley Cup Final for the first time since 2009. He scored the Cup-winning goal in game six of the 2016 Stanley Cup Final, against Martin Jones of the San Jose Sharks. He became just the fourth player in NHL history to record a point on all four game-winning goals in the Stanley Cup Final. He finished fourth in voting for the Norris Trophy, and was named to the end of season second all-star team.

In the 2016–17 season, Letang required neck surgery due to a herniated disk in his neck and did not play in the playoffs. Despite this, his name was added to the Stanley Cup and he received a day with the Cup as well since he met the 41 regular season game requirement having played in 41 games exactly with five goals and 29 assists for 34 points.

Letang enjoyed a healthy 2017–18 campaign as he recorded nine goals and 42 assists for 51 points in 79 games. He was named to the 2018 NHL All-Star Game. He recorded three goals and eight assists for 11 points in all 12 playoff games as the Penguins would defeat the in-state rival Philadelphia Flyers in six games, matching up a second round series against the Washington Capitals for a third consecutive season, where the Penguins would lose to the eventual Stanley Cup champion Capitals in six games.

==== Recent years (2018–present) ====
On October 6, 2018, in a 5–1 loss to the Montreal Canadiens, Letang recorded his 441st assist, setting a new Penguins franchise record for most points by a defenceman. In January 2019, Letang was voted to the 2019 NHL All-Star Game as part of the 'Last Men In' vote. On February 11, 2019, in a 4–1 win over the Philadelphia Flyers, Letang passed Paul Coffey for most goals by a Penguins defenceman.

On October 13, 2019, he recorded his 500th NHL point, assisting on a Sam Lafferty goal against the Winnipeg Jets. Letang was named to the 2020 NHL All-Star Game, and served as captain of the Metropolitan Division team.

With his prior eight-year deal concluding at the end of the 2021–22 season, Letang was poised to become an unrestricted free agent, but on July 7 he opted to sign a six-year, $36.6 million extension with the Penguins. The Hockey News remarked that the term ensured that he "will very likely retire as a Penguin." Early into the 2022–23 season, Letang suffered a stroke on November 28, the second of his career. His condition was not believed to be career-threatening, but it was announced that he would be out indefinitely. He was ultimately absent for twelve days, and on December 10 he returned to the line-up, skating 22:14 in a 3–1 victory against the Buffalo Sabres. Letang missed further time in January 2023, following the death of his father, Claude Fouquet, which caused him to leave prior to the 2023 NHL Winter Classic against the Boston Bruins. The Penguins subsequently travelled to Montreal to join him for the wake. On April 2, 2023, Letang became the third player in Penguins history to play his 1,000th NHL game with the team, joining Crosby and Malkin (who also played his 1,000th game earlier that season). Letang ultimately played 64 games, registering 12 goals and 29 assists. In recognition of his performing despite multiple health and familial issues, Letang was named a finalist for the Masterton Trophy for the second time; he won the Masteron Trophy at the 2023 NHL Awards. The season was a disappointment for the Penguins, who missed the playoffs for the first time in sixteen years and the first time in Letang's career.

In April 2025, Letang underwent surgery to close a patent foramen ovale (PFO), a small hole in the heart. He finished the 2024–25 season with nine goals and 21 assists in 74 games.

In October 2025, Letang, Sidney Crosby, and Evgeni Malkin were recognized by the Penguins before their first game of the 2025–26 season as the first trio of teammates to play 20 seasons together in the history of major North American sports.

== International play ==
Medal record

Representing Canada

Ice hockey

World Junior Championships
Gold medal – first place	2007 Sweden	
Gold medal – first place	2006 Canada	

IIHF World U18 Championships
Silver medal – second place	2005 Czech Republic	

Letang debuted internationally for Canada in his junior rookie season during the 2005 World U18 Championships in the Czech Republic. Letang scored four points in six games in a silver medal effort, losing to the United States in the final.

The next two years, Letang competed in the World Junior Championships, earning gold in 2006 and 2007, as part of a five-year Canadian championship run. He won the first gold medal with Canada in Vancouver as the host country, then returned the next year in Sweden to score six points in six games as team captain. Letang was named to the tournament All-Star team, along with national teammates Carey Price and Jonathan Toews.

== Personal life ==
Letang lost one of his closest friends, Luc Bourdon, who was a defensive prospect for the Vancouver Canucks, when he died in a motorcycle accident on May 29, 2008. Letang was at the time playing in the 2008 Stanley Cup Final against the Detroit Red Wings. He and Bourdon had been teammates in junior with the Val-d'Or Foreurs and the Canadian junior team. He had been planning on buying a motorcycle but decided against it following the death of Bourdon.

Letang and his then long-term girlfriend, Catherine Laflamme, had a son born in November 2012. The couple wed on July 18, 2015, in Montreal. On December 20, 2017, the couple announced on Instagram they were expecting a second child. Their daughter was born in July 2018. His wife was a cast member on the third season of the Canadian reality series Hockey Wives.

== Career statistics ==
=== Regular season and playoffs ===
			Regular season					Playoffs
Season	Team	League	GP	G	A	Pts	PIM	GP	G	A	Pts	PIM
2002–03	Collège Antoine–Girouard	QMAAA	42	2	10	12	34	—	—	—	—	—
2003–04	Collège Antoine–Girouard	QMAAA	39	12	41	53	94	13	7	9	16	38
2004–05	Val-d'Or Foreurs	QMJHL	70	13	19	32	79	—	—	—	—	—
2005–06	Val-d'Or Foreurs	QMJHL	60	25	43	68	156	5	1	5	6	20
2006–07	Val-d'Or Foreurs	QMJHL	40	14	38	52	74	19	12	19	31	48
2006–07	Pittsburgh Penguins	NHL	7	2	0	2	4	—	—	—	—	—
2006–07	Wilkes-Barre/Scranton Penguins	AHL	—	—	—	—	—	1	0	1	1	2
2007–08	Wilkes-Barre/Scranton Penguins	AHL	10	1	6	7	4	—	—	—	—	—
2007–08	Pittsburgh Penguins	NHL	63	6	11	17	23	16	0	2	2	12
2008–09	Pittsburgh Penguins	NHL	74	10	23	33	24	23	4	9	13	26
2009–10	Pittsburgh Penguins	NHL	73	3	24	27	51	13	5	2	7	6
2010–11	Pittsburgh Penguins	NHL	82	8	42	50	101	7	0	4	4	10
2011–12	Pittsburgh Penguins	NHL	51	10	32	42	34	6	1	4	5	21
2012–13	Pittsburgh Penguins	NHL	35	5	33	38	16	15	3	13	16	8
2013–14	Pittsburgh Penguins	NHL	37	11	11	22	16	13	2	4	6	14
2014–15	Pittsburgh Penguins	NHL	69	11	43	54	79	—	—	—	—	—
2015–16	Pittsburgh Penguins	NHL	71	16	51	67	66	23	3	12	15	22
2016–17	Pittsburgh Penguins	NHL	41	5	29	34	32	—	—	—	—	—
2017–18	Pittsburgh Penguins	NHL	79	9	42	51	56	12	3	8	11	15
2018–19	Pittsburgh Penguins	NHL	65	16	40	56	48	4	0	1	1	2
2019–20	Pittsburgh Penguins	NHL	61	15	29	44	38	4	0	0	0	0
2020–21	Pittsburgh Penguins	NHL	55	7	38	45	32	6	1	5	6	6
2021–22	Pittsburgh Penguins	NHL	78	10	58	68	49	7	1	3	4	0
2022–23	Pittsburgh Penguins	NHL	64	12	29	41	30	—	—	—	—	—
2023–24	Pittsburgh Penguins	NHL	82	10	41	51	62	—	—	—	—	—
2024–25	Pittsburgh Penguins	NHL	74	9	21	30	52	—	—	—	—	—
2025–26	Pittsburgh Penguins	NHL	74	3	31	34	38	6	2	0	2	20
NHL totals			1,235	178	628	806	843	155	25	67	92	162

=== International ===
Year	Team	Event	Result	GP	G	A	Pts	PIM
2004	Canada Quebec	U17	3rd place, bronze medalist(s)	6	1	1	2	18
2005	Canada	WJC18	2nd place, silver medalist(s)	6	2	2	4	20
2006	Canada	WJC	1st place, gold medalist(s)	6	1	2	3	2
2007	Canada	WJC	1st place, gold medalist(s)	6	0	6	6	12
Junior totals				24	4	11	15	54

== Awards ==
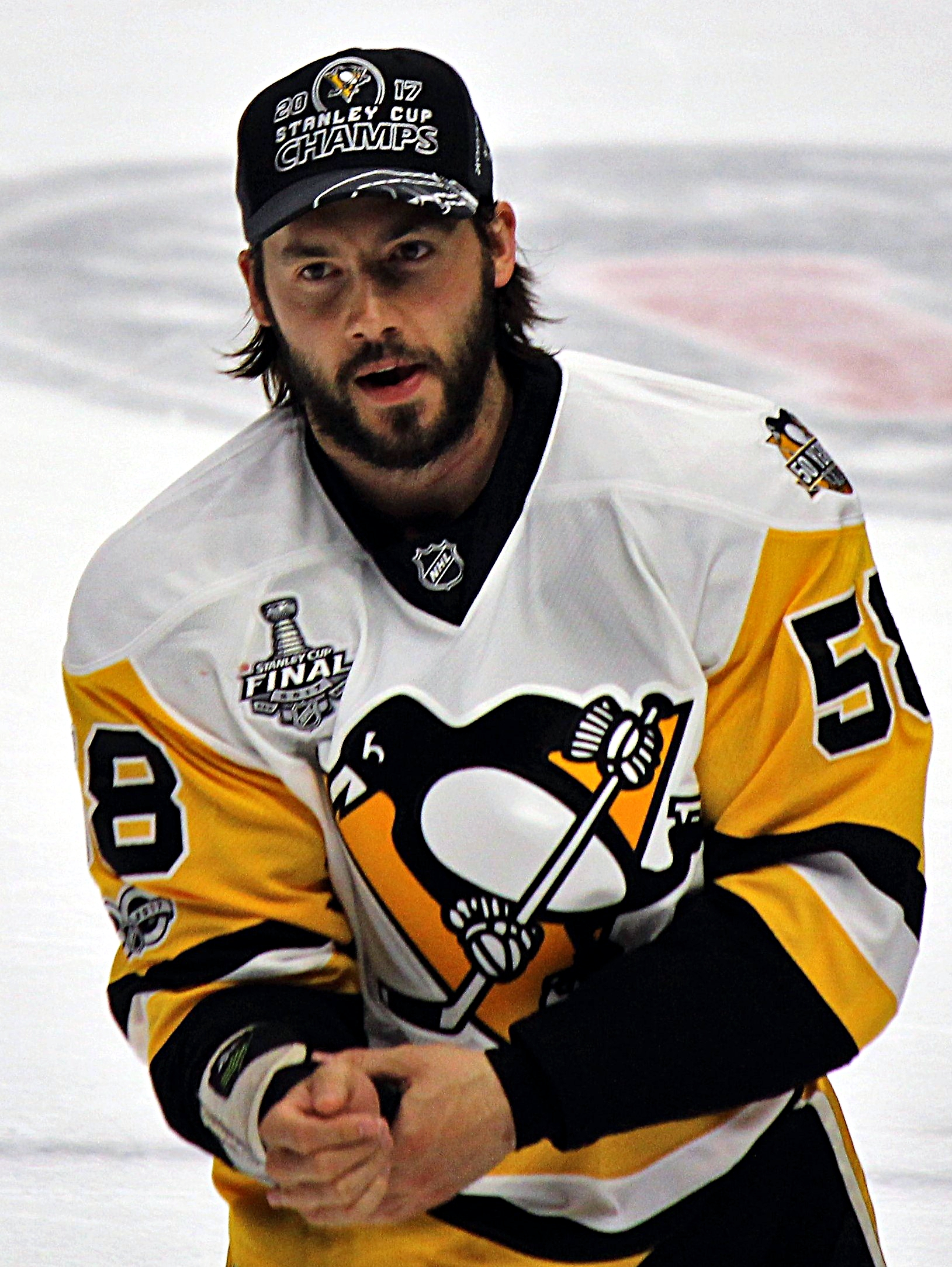
Letang after winning his third Stanley Cup as a member of the Penguins in 2017.

=== NHL ===
National Hockey League
Award	Year
NHL YoungStars Game	2008, 2009
Stanley Cup champion	2009, 2016, 2017
NHL All-Star Game	2011, 2012, 2016, 2018, 2019, 2020
NHL Second Team All-Star	2013, 2016
Bill Masterton Memorial Trophy	2023

=== Pittsburgh Penguins team awards ===
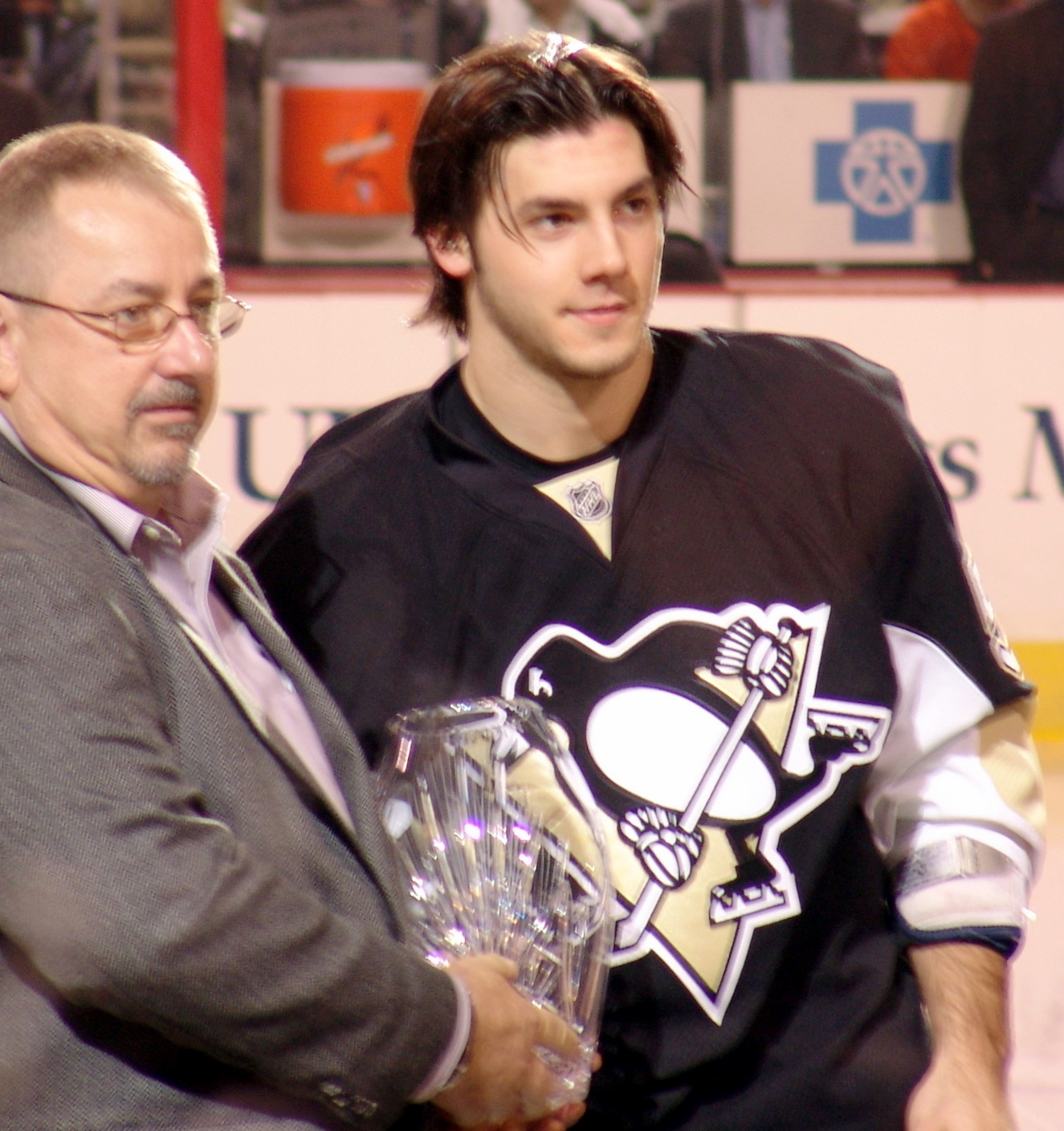
Letang receiving the Michel Brière Rookie of the Year Award in April 2008

Penguins Team Awards
Award	Year
Michel Brière Rookie of the Year Award	2008
Pittsburgh Penguins' Defensive Player of the Year	2015, 2016

=== IIHF ===
International
Award	Year
World Junior Ice Hockey Championships All-Star team	2007

=== Major junior ===
Major junior
Award	Year
QMJHL All-Rookie Team in	2005
CHL All Rookie Team	2005
QMJHL first All-Star team in	2006 and 2007
Emile Bouchard Trophy	2007
Kevin Lowe Trophy	2007
Paul Dumont Trophy	2007

== Records ==
=== NHL ===
- Most assists in a period (5, tied with Dale Hawerchuk)
- Most assists in a game by a defenceman (6, tied with 6 others)

=== Pittsburgh Penguins ===
- Most career goals by a defenceman (175)
- Most career assists by a defenceman (597)
- Most career points by a defenceman (772)
- Most assists in a game (6, tied with 3 others)
- Most assists in a playoff game by a defenceman (4, tied with 2 others)
- Most points in a playoff game by a defenceman (4, tied with 2 others)
- Most career playoff assists by a defenceman (67)
- Most career playoff goals by a defenceman (23)
- Most career playoff points by a defenceman (90)

Awards and achievements
Preceded by Carey Price	Bill Masterton Memorial Trophy; 2023	Succeeded by Connor Ingram
