= Éric Gélinas =

Canadian ice hockey player (born 1991)

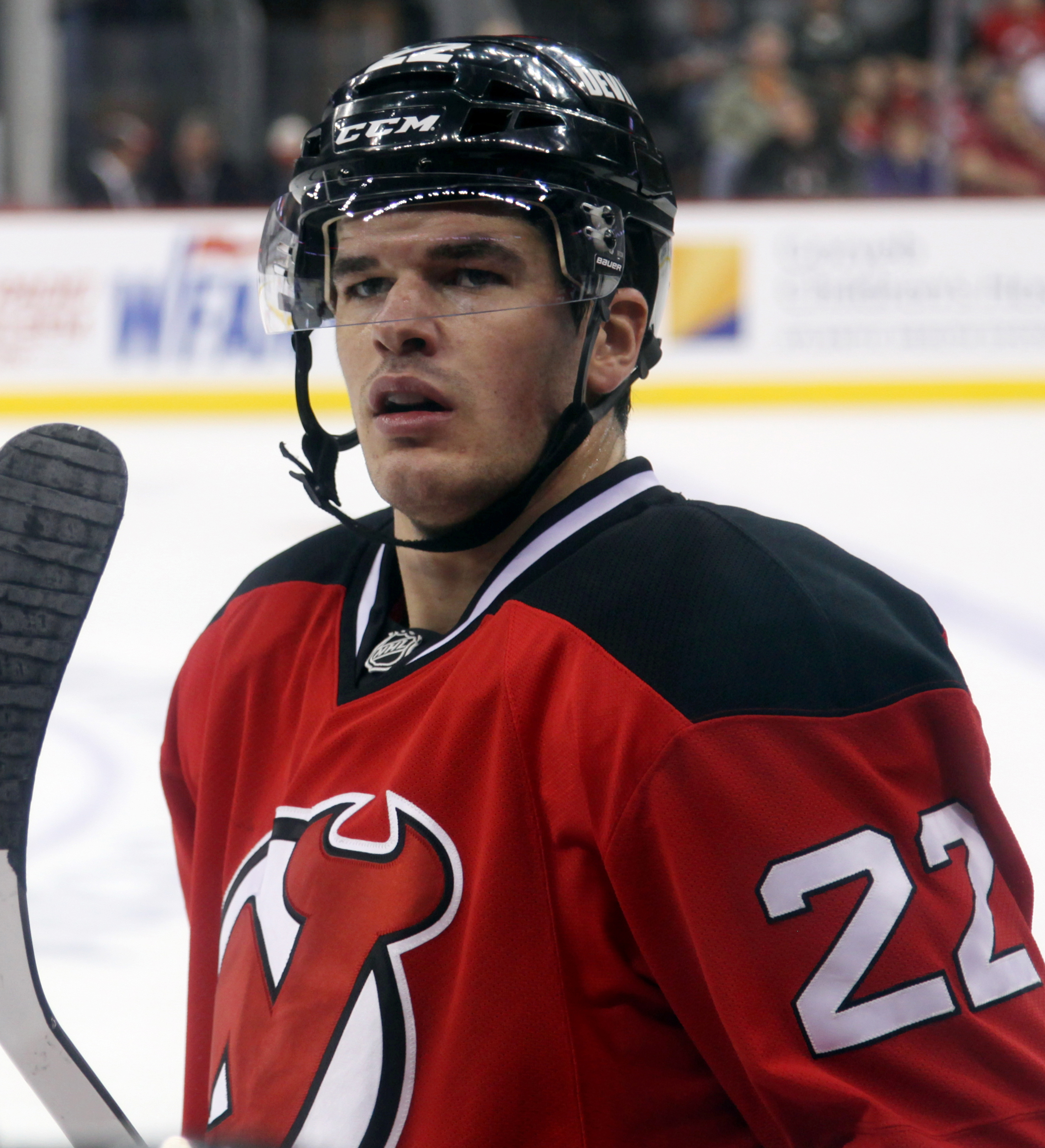
- Gélinas with the New Jersey Devils in 2014
- Born: May 8, 1991 (age 35) Vanier, Ontario, Canada
- Height: 6 ft 4 in (193 cm)
- Weight: 210 lb (95 kg; 15 st 0 lb)
- Position: Defence
- Shoots: Left
- Liiga team Former teams: Lukko; New Jersey Devils; Colorado Avalanche; HC Slovan Bratislava; Rögle BK; Djurgårdens IF; SC Bern; HC Ajoie
- NHL draft: 54th overall, 2009; New Jersey Devils
- Playing career: 2011–present

Éric Gélinas (born May 8, 1991) is a Canadian professional ice hockey defenceman for Lukko of the Liiga. He was selected in the second round, 54th overall, by the New Jersey Devils in the 2009 NHL entry draft. Gélinas has also previously played for the Colorado Avalanche.

== Playing career ==
=== Amateur ===
Gélinas began playing ice hockey at the age of four, and modelled his game after Chris Pronger, from whom he took the jersey number 44. At the major junior level, Gélinas played two seasons for the now-defunct Lewiston Maineiacs of the Quebec Major Junior Hockey League (QMJHL), and in 2008–09 led team defencemen in points, registering ten goals and 29 assists in 67 games. He also participated in the 2009 CHL Top Prospects Game. At the end of the season, on June 26, 2009, he was drafted by the New Jersey Devils in the second round, 54th overall, at the 2009 NHL entry draft.

Following the Maineiacs' folding in 2011, Gélinas played one-and-a-half seasons for the Chicoutimi Saguenéens before eventually being traded to the Saint John Sea Dogs. He was then part of the Sea Dogs team that won the 2011 Memorial Cup, defeating the Mississauga St. Michael's Majors in the final.

=== Professional ===
Upon finishing his major junior career, Gélinas was assigned to the Albany Devils, New Jersey's affiliate in the American Hockey League (AHL). He played in 75 games during the 2011–12 season, tying the AHL lead in goals by a defenceman with 16, while being named top Albany defenceman and finishing 16th overall in the League in points for a defenceman, with 37.

In the following season, 2012–13, Gélinas missed nearly two months of action after taking a puck in the mouth during Albany's final pre-season game at the Binghamton Senators on October 6, 2012; the impact left him with a broken lower jaw. After returning from the injury, Gélinas played 57 games, scoring six goals and 16 assists for 22 points.

On April 23, 2013, Gélinas was called up from Albany to join the New Jersey Devils. He made his NHL debut at the Devils' last home game of the 2012–13 season against the Pittsburgh Penguins. In the 2013–14 season, he scored his first NHL goal on October 24, 2013, against Roberto Luongo of the Vancouver Canucks.

Following the 2014–15 season, Gélinas became a restricted free agent under the NHL Collective Bargaining Agreement. The New Jersey Devils made him a qualifying offer to retain his NHL rights and, on July 5, 2015, Gélinas filed for salary arbitration.

In the 2015–16 season, Gélinas was traded at the trade deadline to the Colorado Avalanche in exchange for a 2017 3rd-round pick on February 29, 2016.

On June 26, 2017, Gélinas as an impending restricted free agent, was not tendered a qualifying contract by the Colorado Avalanche, thus ending his tenure with club in releasing him to free agency.

On August 29, 2017, Gélinas signed with the Montreal Canadiens to a professional tryout contract, where he would attend the team's training camp. Gélinas was not given a contract by the Canadiens, but was signed by the team's AHL affiliate, the Laval Rocket on October 1. In the 2017–18 season, Gélinas regained his scoring touch from the blueline with the Rocket, contributing with 13 goals and 26 points in 64 games as Laval missed out on the playoffs in their inaugural season.

As a free agent in the off-season and unable to attract an NHL contract, Gélinas opted to pursue a contract abroad, agreeing to a one-year deal with Slovak club, Slovan Bratislava of the Kontinental Hockey League (KHL) on August 23, 2018. In the 2018–19 season, Gélinas established himself with Slovan in a top four pairing role on the blueline, recording 5 goals and 15 points in 52 games. With Slovan eliminated from playoff contention, Gélinas left the club with 3 game left in the season to join Swedish outfit Rögle BK of the SHL, for their post-season push on February 17, 2019.

After three productive European seasons, Gélinas returned to North America and signed as a free agent to a one-year, two-way contract with the Carolina Hurricanes on June 13, 2021. After attending the Hurricanes training camp, Gélinas was assigned to AHL affiliate, the Chicago Wolves, to begin the 2021–22 season. Having registered just 2 goals through 9 games, Gélinas unable to cement a regular role with the Wolves was placed on unconditional waivers to mutually terminate his contract with the Hurricanes on November 21, 2021.

On November 23, 2021, Gélinas was promptly signed for the remainder of the season to re-join Rögle BK of the SHL. He appeared in only 12 games in his return to Rögle BK, unable to replicate his previous offensive output with only 2 points. On February 12, 2022, he transferred within the SHL to relegation threatened Djurgårdens IF for the remainder of the season. He collected 4 goals and 6 points through 13 games with Djurgårdens IF before he was unable to help prevent demotion to the HockeyAllsvenskan at the completion of the season.

During his brief tenure with Djurgårdens, Gélinas agreed to a two-year contract with Swiss club, SC Bern of the NL, on February 15, 2022. Limited to just 15 regular season games for the 2022–23 season, Gélinas was granted a release from the final year of his deal with Bern and joined fellow Swiss club, HC Ajoie, on June 20, 2023.

Gélinas joined Rauman Lukko in December 2024 and quickly became a key player, especially on the power play, scoring 6 goals and 11 assists in 21 games before a knee injury in February sidelined him . Despite the injury, his impact was significant, and Lukko has extended his contract for the upcoming 2025–26 season.

== Personal life ==
Gélinas' father, Marc Gélinas, as well as his older brother, Karl, both played baseball. His father was drafted by the Pittsburgh Pirates at the 1978 MLB draft, while his brother was drafted by the Los Angeles Angels of Anaheim at the 2003 MLB draft, and is playing for the CanAm League's Québec Capitales. His uncle, Pierre Gelinas, was a CFL football player for the Montreal Alouettes.

== Career statistics ==
			Regular season					Playoffs
Season	Team	League	GP	G	A	Pts	PIM	GP	G	A	Pts	PIM
2007–08	Lewiston MAINEiacs	QMJHL	54	3	16	19	34	5	0	0	0	2
2008–09	Lewiston MAINEiacs	QMJHL	67	10	29	39	80	4	0	1	1	12
2009–10	Lewiston MAINEiacs	QMJHL	33	3	16	19	33	—	—	—	—	—
2009–10	Chicoutimi Saguenéens	QMJHL	28	3	9	12	26	6	1	4	5	6
2010–11	Chicoutimi Saguenéens	QMJHL	35	9	15	24	41	—	—	—	—	—
2010–11	Saint John Sea Dogs	QMJHL	27	3	17	20	26	19	5	7	12	25
2011–12	Albany Devils	AHL	75	16	21	37	55	—	—	—	—	—
2012–13	Albany Devils	AHL	57	6	16	22	46	—	—	—	—	—
2012–13	New Jersey Devils	NHL	1	0	0	0	0	—	—	—	—	—
2013–14	Albany Devils	AHL	13	1	4	5	10	4	0	1	1	0
2013–14	New Jersey Devils	NHL	60	7	22	29	22	—	—	—	—	—
2014–15	New Jersey Devils	NHL	61	6	13	19	42	—	—	—	—	—
2015–16	New Jersey Devils	NHL	34	1	5	6	16	—	—	—	—	—
2015–16	Colorado Avalanche	NHL	6	0	0	0	0	—	—	—	—	—
2016–17	Colorado Avalanche	NHL	27	0	1	1	12	—	—	—	—	—
2016–17	San Antonio Rampage	AHL	27	3	9	12	14	—	—	—	—	—
2017–18	Laval Rocket	AHL	64	13	13	26	52	—	—	—	—	—
2018–19	HC Slovan Bratislava	KHL	52	5	10	15	32	—	—	—	—	—
2018–19	Rögle BK	SHL	8	1	3	4	4	2	1	0	1	2
2019–20	Rögle BK	SHL	36	5	13	18	16	—	—	—	—	—
2020–21	Rögle BK	SHL	46	8	26	34	53	14	1	6	7	10
2021–22	Chicago Wolves	AHL	9	2	0	2	6	—	—	—	—	—
2021–22	Rögle BK	SHL	12	1	1	2	4	—	—	—	—	—
2021–22	Djurgårdens IF	SHL	13	4	2	6	10	—	—	—	—	—
2022–23	SC Bern	NL	15	0	3	3	12	—	—	—	—	—
2023–24	HC Ajoie	NL	30	5	9	14	33	—	—	—	—	—
2024–25	Lukko	Liiga	21	6	11	17	12	11	2	4	6	14
2025–26	Lukko	Liiga	57	10	14	24	30	4	0	1	1	6
NHL totals			189	14	41	55	92	—	—	—	—	—
SHL totals			115	19	45	64	87	16	2	6	8	12
