= 2006–07 QMJHL season =

Canadian junior ice hockey season

The 2006–07 QMJHL season was the 38th season in the history of the Quebec Major Junior Hockey League. The regular season ran from September 14, 2006 to March 18, 2007. Eighteen teams played 70 games each in the schedule. The Lewiston Maineiacs finished first overall in the regular season winning their first Jean Rougeau Trophy. Lewiston won 16 playoff games, losing only one, en route to their first President's Cup, defeating the Val-d'Or Foreurs in the finals.

== Final standings ==
Note: GP = Games played; W = Wins; L = Losses; OTL = Overtime loss; SL = Shootout loss; PTS = Points; GF = Goals for; GA = Goals against

Telus Division	GP	W	L	OTL	SL	Pts	GF	GA
y-Val-d'Or Foreurs	70	41	23	4	2	88	280	231
x-Victoriaville Tigres	70	38	25	3	4	83	264	240
x-Gatineau Olympiques	70	39	27	2	2	82	303	274
x-Drummondville Voltigeurs	70	37	26	1	6	81	262	255
x-Quebec Remparts	70	37	28	2	3	79	294	288
x-Rouyn-Noranda Huskies	70	36	27	3	4	79	265	266
x-Baie-Comeau Drakkar	70	35	26	1	8	79	304	285
x-Chicoutimi Saguenéens	70	34	28	7	1	76	235	236
x-Shawinigan Cataractes	70	25	39	2	4	56	228	301
Rimouski Océanic	70	22	39	7	2	53	237	303

Eastern Division	GP	W	L	OTL	SL	Pts	GF	GA
y-Lewiston Maineiacs	70	50	14	2	4	106	282	196
x-Cape Breton Screaming Eagles	70	46	22	2	0	94	308	200
x-Moncton Wildcats	70	39	25	4	2	84	254	263
x-P.E.I. Rocket	70	36	26	2	6	80	278	250
x-Acadie-Bathurst Titan	70	35	28	2	5	77	291	269
x-Halifax Mooseheads	70	32	31	3	4	71	269	287
x-St. John's Fog Devils	70	28	36	2	4	62	228	310
Saint John Sea Dogs	70	20	47	1	2	43	209	337

- complete list of standings.

== Scoring leaders ==
Note: GP = Games played; G = Goals; A = Assists; Pts = Points; PIM = Penalty minutes

Player	Team	GP	G	A	Pts	PIM
François Bouchard	Baie-Comeau Drakkar	68	45	80	125	72
Thomas Beauregard	Acadie-Bathurst Titan	69	71	53	124	44
Mathieu Perreault	Acadie-Bathurst Titan	67	41	78	119	66
Claude Giroux	Gatineau Olympiques	63	48	64	112	49
David Desharnais	Chicoutimi Saguenéens	61	38	70	108	32
Brent Aubin	Quebec Remparts	68	51	54	105	124
Vyacheslav Trukhno	Gatineau Olympiques	60	25	77	102	67
Benoît Doucet	Victoriaville Tigres	64	43	57	100	38
Morten Madsen	Victoriaville Tigres	62	32	68	100	86
Jérôme Samson	Val-d'Or Foreurs	71	44	55	99	36

- complete scoring statistics

== Leading goaltenders ==
Note: GP = Games played; Mins = Minutes Played; W = Wins; L = Losses: OTL = Overtime losses; SL = Shootout losses; GA = Goals allowed; SO = Shutouts; GAA = Goals against average

Player	Team	GP	Mins	W	L	GA	SO	Sv%	GAA
Ondřej Pavelec	Cape Breton Screaming Eagles	43	2335	28	11	98	1	0.908	2.52
Jonathan Bernier	Lewiston Maineiacs	37	2185	26	10	94	2	0.905	2.58
Peter Delmas	Lewiston Maineiacs	34	1982	23	10	93	3	0.898	2.81
Guillaume Blouin	Rouyn-Noranda Huskies	11	488	3	3	24	0	0.902	2.95
Pier-Olivier Pelletier	Halifax Mooseheads	51	2952	29	18	146	1	0.901	2.97

== Canada-Russia Challenge ==
The 2006 ADT Canada-Russia Challenge was hosted by the Rouyn-Noranda Huskies and the Val-d'Or Foreurs. On November 20, 2006, the QMJHL All-stars defeated the Russian Selects 6–2 at the Aréna Dave Keon. On November 21, 2006, the QMJHL All-stars defeated the Russian Selects 4–3 at the Centre Air Creebec. Since the tournament began in 2003, the QMJHL All-stars have won five games, the Russian Selects have three wins.

== Playoffs ==
The top nine teams from the Telus division, and top seven teams from the Eastern division qualified for the playoffs. The ninth place team in the Telus division qualified in the Eastern division, and ranked by regular season points. All series were best-of-seven. Divisions crossed over in the semifinals.

Brad Marchand was the leading scorer of the playoffs with 40 points (16 goals, 24 assists).

Division quarterfinals	Division semifinals
E1	Lewiston	4
E8^{†}	Shawinigan	0
E1	Lewiston	4
E6	Halifax	1
E3	Moncton	3
E6	Halifax	4
Eastern Division
E2	Cape Breton	4
E7	St. John's	0
E2	Cape Breton	4
E5	Acadie-Bathurst	1
E4	P.E.I.	3
E5	Acadie-Bathurst	4
T1	Val-d'Or	4
T8	Chicoutimi	0
T1	Val-d'Or	4
T7	Baie-Comeau	1
T2	Victoriaville	2
T7	Baie-Comeau	4
Telus Division
T4	Drummondville	4
T5	Quebec	1
T4	Drummondville	3
T6	Rouyn-Noranda	4
T3	Gatineau	1
T6	Rouyn-Noranda	4

Semifinals
E1	Lewiston	4
T6	Rouyn-Noranda	0
T1	Val-d'Or	4
E2	Cape Breton	3

Finals
E1	Lewiston	4
T1	Val-d'Or	0

^{†}Shawinigan seeded 8th in Eastern division.

== All-star teams ==
First team

- Goaltender - Ondrej Pavelec, Cape Breton Screaming Eagles
- Left defence - Andrew MacDonald, Moncton Wildcats
- Right defence - Kris Letang, Val-d'Or Foreurs
- Left winger - Vyacheslav Trukhno, Gatineau Olympiques
- Centreman - Mathieu Perreault, Acadie-Bathurst Titan
- Right winger - Thomas Beauregard, Acadie-Bathurst Titan

Second team

- Goaltender - Jonathan Bernier, Lewiston Maineiacs
- Left defence - Oskars Bartulis, Cape Breton Screaming Eagles
- Right defence - Jean-Claude Sawyer, Cape Breton Screaming Eagles
- Left winger - Benoît Doucet, Victoriaville Tigres
- Centreman - James Sheppard, Cape Breton Screaming Eagles
- Right winger - François Bouchard, Baie-Comeau Drakkar

Rookie team

- Goaltender - Peter Delmas, Lewiston Maineiacs
- Left defence - Mark Barberio, Cape Breton Screaming Eagles / Moncton Wildcats
- Right defence - Simon Lacroix, Shawinigan Cataractes
- Left winger - Michael Frolik, Rimouski Océanic
- Centreman - Christopher DiDomenico, Saint John Sea Dogs
- Right winger - Jakub Voracek, Halifax Mooseheads
- List of First/Second/Rookie team all-stars.

== Trophies and awards ==
Team

- President's Cup - Playoff Champions, Lewiston Maineiacs
- Jean Rougeau Trophy - Regular Season Champions, Lewiston Maineiacs
- Luc Robitaille Trophy - Team that scored the most goals, Cape Breton Screaming Eagles
- Robert Lebel Trophy - Team with best GAA, Lewiston Maineiacs

Player

- Michel Brière Memorial Trophy - Most Valuable Player, Mathieu Perreault, Acadie-Bathurst Titan
- Jean Béliveau Trophy - Top Scorer, François Bouchard, Baie-Comeau Drakkar
- Guy Lafleur Trophy - Playoff MVP, Jonathan Bernier, Lewiston Maineiacs
- Telus Cup – Offensive - Offensive Player of the Year
- Telus Cup – Defensive - Defensive Player of the Year
- Jacques Plante Memorial Trophy - Best GAA, Ondrej Pavelec, Cape Breton Screaming Eagles
- Guy Carbonneau Trophy - Best Defensive Forward, Marc-André Cliche - Lewiston Maineiacs
- Emile Bouchard Trophy - Defenceman of the Year, Kris Letang, Val-d'Or Foreurs
- Kevin Lowe Trophy - Best Defensive Defenceman, Kris Letang, Val-d'Or Foreurs
- Mike Bossy Trophy - Best Pro Prospect, Angelo Esposito, Quebec Remparts
- RDS Cup - Rookie of the Year, Jakub Voracek, Halifax Mooseheads
- Michel Bergeron Trophy - Offensive Rookie of the Year, Jakub Voracek, Halifax Mooseheads
- Raymond Lagacé Trophy - Defensive Rookie of the Year, T. J. Brennan, St. John's Fog Devils
- Frank J. Selke Memorial Trophy - Most sportsmanlike player, David Desharnais, Chicoutimi Saguenéens
- QMJHL Humanitarian of the Year - Humanitarian of the Year, Roger Kennedy, Halifax Mooseheads
- Marcel Robert Trophy - Best Scholastic Player, Alexandre Picard-Hooper, Baie-Comeau Drakkar
- Paul Dumont Trophy - Personality of the Year, Kris Letang, Val-d'Or Foreurs

Executive

- Ron Lapointe Trophy - Coach of the Year, Clément Jodoin, Lewiston Maineiacs
- Maurice Filion Trophy - General Manager of the Year, Pascal Vincent, Cape Breton Screaming Eagles
- John Horman Trophy - Executive of the Year, Pierre Dufour, Val D'Or Foreurs
- Jean Sawyer Trophy - Marketing Director of the Year, Nadia Lacasse & Mélanie Allard, Rouyn-Noranda Huskies

== See also ==
- 2007 Memorial Cup
- 2007 NHL entry draft
- 2006–07 OHL season
- 2006–07 WHL season

Preceded by 2005–06 QMJHL season	QMJHL seasons	Succeeded by 2007–08 QMJHL season
