= Lewiston Maineiacs =

Junior ice hockey team in Lewiston, Maine

- City: Lewiston, Maine
- League: Quebec Major Junior Hockey League
- Operated: 2003–2011
- Home arena: Androscoggin Bank Colisée
- Colors: Black, blue and orange

Franchise history
- 1969–1973: Trois-Rivières Ducs
- 1973–1992: Trois-Rivières Draveurs
- 1992–1998: Sherbrooke Faucons
- 1998–2003: Sherbrooke Castors
- 2003–2011: Lewiston Maineiacs

The Lewiston Maineiacs were a junior ice hockey team of the Quebec Major Junior Hockey League based in Lewiston, Maine, United States. The team played its home games at the Androscoggin Bank Colisée. They were the second QMJHL team in the United States, and the only one to play a full season. They won the President's Cup in 2007, becoming the only American based franchise to accomplish the feat.

On May 31, 2011, the QMJHL decided to fold the team following eight years of financial losses.

== History ==
Their franchise was granted for the 1969–70 season. They played in Trois-Rivières, Quebec, from 1969 to 1992. They were known as the Ducs from 1969 to 1973, and as the Draveurs from 1973 to 1992. They moved to Sherbrooke, Quebec, in 1992 to become the Faucons (1992–1998) and the Castors (1998–2003). The Castors moved to Lewiston, Maine, in 2003.

The MAINEiacs clinched the Jean Rougeau Trophy for first overall in the regular season for 2006–07. During the same season, Lewiston increased its annual attendance totals to 94,903 tickets sold. In the playoffs that year, Lewiston went 16–1 to cruise to their first President's Cup.

=== 2007 Memorial Cup ===
After winning the 2007 President's Cup, the MAINEiacs won eligibility to play in the 2007 Memorial Cup in Vancouver, British Columbia. Following an opening win over the Medicine Hat Tigers, the MAINEiacs suffered a huge loss with the injury of their captain, Marc-André Cliche, and never really found their scoring touch. They crashed out of the tournament in fourth place after losing consecutive games to the Vancouver Giants, Plymouth Whalers, and the Whalers again in the tie-breaker, scoring only three goals in three games in the process.

Scores

- Saturday, May 19: Lewiston 3, Medicine Hat Tigers 1
- Sunday, May 20: Vancouver Giants 2, Lewiston 1
- Tuesday, May 22: Plymouth Whalers 2, Lewiston 1 (OT)
- Thursday, May 24: Plymouth Whalers 5, Lewiston 1

=== Sale and aborted relocation ===
On January 25, 2009, it was announced that the MAINEiacs were negotiating with the city of Boisbriand, Quebec (a suburb of Montreal), in hopes of relocating the franchise for the 2009–10 season. Under the plan, Mark Just would remain majority owner with 51% of the shares, with former NHL defenseman Joel Bouchard owning the rest. On January 31, the team announced that they had filed their intent to relocate, and had submitted papers to do so to the QMJHL.

In a January 31 media release announcing the move of the MAINEiacs franchise, owner Mark Just said that community support for the team was a major consideration. During the six seasons since the team moved from Sherbrooke, Quebec, to Lewiston, the MAINEiacs never managed to break even. However, on February 2, Farrel Miller, owner of the QMJHL's Montreal Junior Hockey Club, issued a statement that his team would fight the MAINEiacs move to Boisbriand on territorial grounds.

The Montreal Junior Hockey Club has communicated to the QMJHL that it will retain, without modification, its exclusive geographic territory that it acquired in connection with its 2008 Franchise Agreement with the QMJHL. On January 21, 2009, the Montreal Junior Hockey Club communicated to the Governors of the QMJHL that (i) it has chosen to retain its exclusive territory without modification and (ii) that it is not seeking any financial compensation in connection with this issue.

After several weeks of negotiations with a number of Canadian cities (most notably Fredericton, New Brunswick), MAINEiacs Head Coach Don Macadam announced on March 24, 2009, that the MAINEiacs would be remaining in Lewiston. In June 2010, Lewiston businessman Paul Spellman became minority owner of the team, and in early August 2010, former Moncton Wildcats General Manager Bill Schurman was named as the team's Sports Management Consultant. However, relocation rumors continued to follow the team, with Summerside, Prince Edward Island (where Schurman, a native of that town, had recently been the municipality's Director of Community Services), and St. John's, Newfoundland and Labrador, named as a potential destinations in January 2011.

Schurman's denials of the team looking into a Summerside relocation proved unconvincing, and the rumours had a negative effect on attendance. However, Schurman's dream of moving the MAINEiacs to his home city ultimately failed, as a preliminary exploration to gauge support for a move to Summerside found little traction. The team then began to look at other possibilities, but found that few other relocation options existed.

=== Takeover by league and disbanding ===
On May 31, 2011, the Quebec Major Junior Hockey League held a conference call to prepare an offer to purchase the team from Mark Just for 3.5 million dollars. Under the league's plan, the MAINEiacs would then be disbanded, with players being selected by other clubs in a dispersal draft. Late on May 31, the league issued a press release confirming the sale of the MAINEiacs to the league, and the subsequent disbanding / dispersal draft occurred the following week. Colisée stated they would search for a replacement team from outside of the QMJHL to take the MAINEiacs place.

The Lewiston franchise was disbanded by the QMJHL in the summer of 2011. To replace the defunct MAINEiacs club, the Sherbrooke Phoenix were scheduled to begin play for the 2012–13 season, the 3rd franchise to call Sherbrooke home in 25 years.

The City of Lewiston and the Androscoggin Bank Colisée would end up getting the American Hockey League's Portland Pirates to move to the Colisée for the 2013–14 season after disputing their lease with the Cumberland County Civic Center in Portland. Starting in 2019, the NAHL Maine Nordiques and their partner organization, the NA3HL Lewiston-Auburn Nordiques, began play at the Colisée.

== Coaches ==
- Mario Durocher: 2003–04
- Clément Jodoin: 2004–2007
- Ed Harding: 2007 – January 12, 2009
- Don MacAdam: January 13, 2009 – December 10, 2009
- Jeff Guay: interim: December 10, 2009 – December 27, 2009 (then moved to assistant coach).
- Jean-François Houle: December 27, 2009 – May 31, 2011

== Players ==
=== QMJHL award winners ===
- Mike Bossy Trophy — best pro prospect: Alexandre Picard, 2004
- Paul Dumont Trophy — personality of the year: Clement Jodoin, 2006
- Ron Lapointe Trophy — Coach of the Year: Clement Jodoin, 2007
- Guy Carbonneau Trophy — Best Defensive forward: Marc-André Cliche, 2007.
- Guy Lafleur Trophy — QMJHL playoff's Most Valuable Player: Jonathan Bernier, 2007

=== All-stars ===
- Jonathan Paiement: 1st team (defense) 2003–04
- Alexandre Picard: 1st team (right wing) 2003–04,
- Alex Bourret: 2nd team (right wing) 2004–05
- Jonathan Bernier: 2nd team (goaltender) 2006–07
- Peter Delmas: all-rookie team (goaltender) 2006–07
- Stefano Giliati: 2nd team (left wing) 2007–08
- Kevin Marshall: 2nd team (defense) 2007–08

=== Captains ===
- 2003–04: Francis Trudel
- 2004–05: No captain
- 2005 – January 2006: Brandon Roach
- January 2006 – May 2007: Marc-André Cliche
- September 2007 – March 2008: Marc-André Daneau
- September 2008 – June 2009: Danick Paquette
- September 2009 – May 2010: Billy Lacasse
- September 2010 – 2011: Cameron Critchlow

=== NHL alumni ===
Nine MAINEiacs to date have played in the NHL:

- Jonathan Bernier
- Antoine Bibeau
- Michael Chaput
- Marc-André Cliche
- Éric Gélinas
- Jaroslav Halák
- Kevin Marshall
- David Perron
- Alexandre Picard

=== NHL draftees ===
In addition, the MAINEiacs have had several players drafted by National Hockey League teams. They are:

2004 NHL Draft

- Alexandre Picard (2004 1st round, #8 overall by Columbus Blue Jackets)
- Jonathan Paiement (2004 8th round, #247 overall by New York Rangers)

2005 NHL Draft

- Alex Bourret (2005 1st round, #16 overall by Atlanta Thrashers)
- Chad Denny (2005 2nd round, #49 overall by Atlanta Thrashers)
- Marc-André Cliche (2005 2nd round, #56 overall by New York Rangers)
- Olivier Legault (2005 4th round, #93 overall by Florida Panthers)
- Mathieu Aubin (2005 5th round, #130 overall by Montreal Canadiens)

2006 NHL Draft

- Jonathan Bernier (2006 1st round, #11 overall by Los Angeles Kings)
- Stefan Chaput (2006 5th round, #153 overall, by Carolina Hurricanes)

2007 NHL Draft

- David Perron (2007 1st round, #26 overall by St. Louis Blues)
- Kevin Marshall (2007 2nd round #41 overall by Philadelphia Flyers)
- Michael Ward (2007 7th round #197 overall by Tampa Bay Lightning)

2008 NHL Draft

- Peter Delmas (2008 2nd round, #61 overall by Colorado Avalanche)
- Danick Paquette (2008 3rd round #64 overall by Atlanta Thrashers)

2009 NHL Draft

- Éric Gélinas (2009 2nd round, #54 overall by New Jersey Devils)

2010 NHL Draft

- Michael Chaput (2010 3rd round, #89 overall by Philadelphia Flyers)
- Samuel Carrier (2010 6th round, #176 overall by Washington Capitals)

== Season-by-season results ==
=== Regular season ===
Legend: OTL = Overtime loss, SL = Shootout loss

Season	Games	Won	Lost	Tied	OTL	SL	Points	Pct %	Goals for	Goals against	Standing
2003–04	70	33	31	5	1	-	72	0.507	233	215	3rd East
2004–05	70	32	30	8	0	-	72	0.514	214	209	4th East
2005–06	70	36	23	-	3	8	83	0.581	240	207	4th East
2006–07	70	50	14	-	2	4	106	0.714	282	196	1st East
2007–08	70	37	26	-	0	5	81	0.579	222	212	5th East
2008–09	68	22	43	-	1	2	47	0.324	190	286	4th Central
2009–10	68	26	42	-	0	0	49	0.382	212	298	4th Central

=== Playoffs ===
- 2003–04 – Lost to Rouyn-Noranda Huskies 4–3 in first round.
- 2004–05 – Defeated Shawinigan Cataractes 4–0 in first round.
  – Lost to Rimouski Océanic 4–0 in quarterfinals.
- 2005–06 – Lost to Halifax Mooseheads 4–2 in conference quarterfinals.
- 2006–07 – Defeated Shawinigan Cataractes 4–0 in conference first roundfinals.
  – Defeated Halifax Mooseheads 4–1 in conference quarterfinals.
  – Defeated Rouyn-Noranda Huskies 4–0 in league semifinals.
  – Defeated Val-d'Or Foreurs 4–0 in QMJHL finals. QMJHL CHAMPIONS
  – Finished Memorial Cup round-robin tied for third.
  – Lost to Plymouth Whalers 5–1 in the tiebreaker game.
- 2007–08 – Lost to Cape Breton Screaming Eagles 4–2 in conference quarterfinals.
- 2008–09 – Lost to Drummondville Voltigeurs 4–0 in conference quarterfinals.
- 2009–10 – Lost to Drummondville Voltigeurs 4–0 in conference quarterfinals.
- 2010–11 – Defeated Moncton Wildcats 4–1 in the round of 16.
  – Defeated Montreal Junior 4–2 in league quarterfinals.
  – Lost to Saint John Sea Dogs 4–0 in league semifinals.
