= Université de Moncton Aigles Bleus Hockey assault =

The Université de Moncton Aigles Bleus Hockey Assault was an on-ice assault which took place in Charlottetown, Prince Edward Island, on February 24, 1996 during the Atlantic University Sport playoff game between the Université de Moncton Aigles Bleus and the UPEI Panthers.

== Incident ==
The game was tied 2-2 during regulation play. With 31.6 seconds remaining in the first overtime period, Tyler Ertel of UPEI fired a shot at the Aigles Bleus' net. The puck hit under the crossbar and bounced back. Initially, referee Brian Carragher did not signal a goal. After consulting the goal judge Carragher awarded the goal to UPEI, giving them the win. Video showed that the puck had likely entered the net.

Moncton goalie Pierre Gagnon grabbed Carragher and reportedly said "You blew it — you choked." Eight Aigles Bleus players backed Carragher into a corner and punched him repeatedly. Carragher was reportedly speared twice in the groin. Patrick Daviault, an assistant coach for the Aigles Bleus, pulled a metal net mooring from the ice and threw it into a pane of glass in front of the goal judge, shattering it.

Two uniformed police officers intervened as did 10 to 15 off-duty police officers who were in the stands along with 10 campus police. The incident took 20 minutes to contain.

== Fallout ==
The Université de Moncton temporarily shut down the men's hockey program pending an investigation.

Initially Frantz Bergevin-Jean, Mathieu Bibeau and Sylvain Ducharme were suspended for five years each by Atlantic University Sport. Pierre Gagnon was suspended for two years and Phillipe Lavoie for one year. Jean Imbeau was given a three-game suspension for throwing a stool on the ice.

On appeal the suspensions were reduced. Bibeau and Ducharme were given three-year suspensions, or two years plus 400 hours of community service. Bergevin-Jean was suspended for two years was suspended for two years or one year and 200 hours of community service. Gagnon's suspension stood at two years but he was given the option to reduce it to one year with 200 hours of community service. Lavoie's suspension was overturned as it was determined that he did not take part in the assault but actually attempted to pry his teammate away using his stick. Imbeau's three-game suspension remained in place.

Police threatened to lay charges, but this did not happen.

The Université de Moncton reinstated the hockey program in April 1996 on the recommendation of Ken Dryden who was asked to investigate the incident.

Assistant coach Patrick Daviault was fired.
