= Moncton Aigles Bleus =

Université de Moncton athletic teams

Moncton Aigles Bleus and Bleues
- University: Université de Moncton
- Association: U Sports
- Conference: Atlantic University Sport
- Athletic director: Martine LeBlanc
- Location: Moncton, New Brunswick
- Varsity teams: 9 (4 men's, 5 women's)
- Ice hockey arena: Jean-Louis Lévesque Arena
- Soccer stadium: Moncton Stadium
- Mascot: Super Blue (French: Super Bleu)
- Colours: Blue and Gold
- Website: www.goaigles.ca
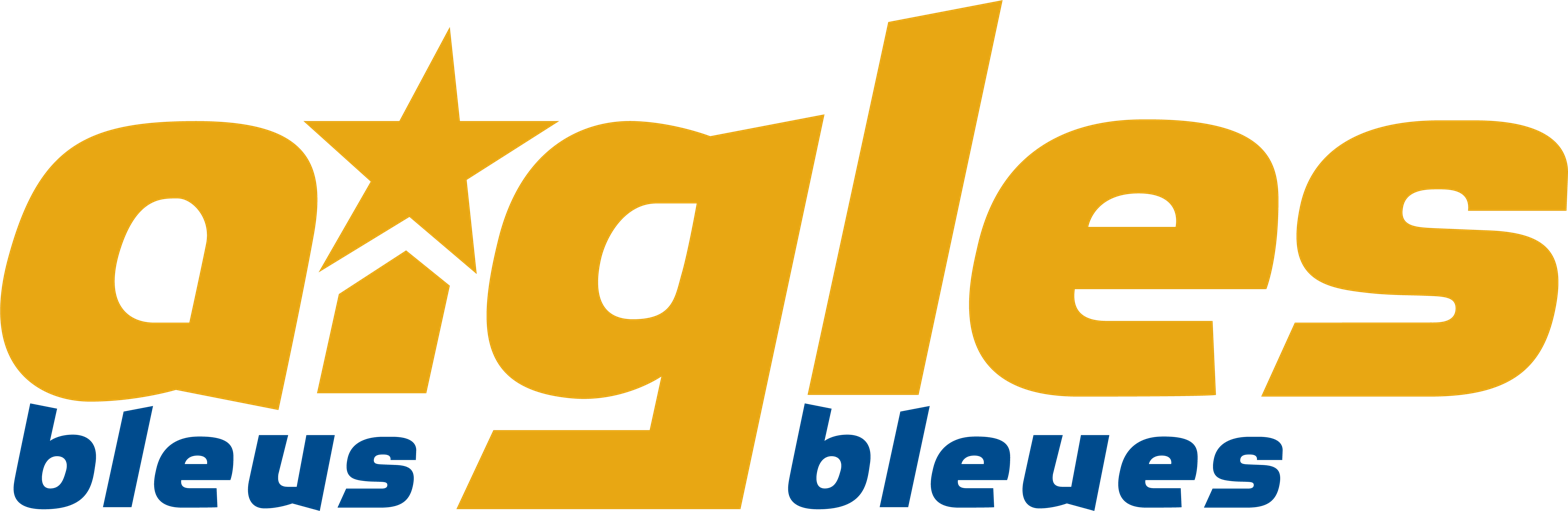

The Moncton Aigles Bleus and Bleues (French: Aigles Bleu(e)s de Moncton; French for: Moncton Blue Eagles) are the athletic teams that represent Université de Moncton in Moncton, New Brunswick, Canada. They play in U Sports, which encompasses university teams from across Canada, and play within the Atlantic University Sport conference. The name Moncton Aigles Bleus was formerly used for male teams only, with the female teams being called the Moncton Anges Bleus, but now the women's teams are called the Moncton Aigles Bleues.

== Varsity Teams ==
Moncton currently has seven varsity programs competing in the following sports:

Men's sports	Women's sports
Cross country	Cross country
Ice hockey	Ice hockey
Soccer	Soccer
Track and field	Track and field
	Volleyball

== Championships ==
The men's hockey team has won 15 championships, 11 of those are at the Atlantic University Sport level, and 4 are at the national U Sports level. The women's hockey team has won one AUS trophy. The men's Athletics team has won 6 AUS. The women's Athletics team has won 2 AUS and women's volleyball has won 5 AUS titles.

== See also ==
- U Sports
- Atlantic University Sport
- Université de Moncton Aigles Bleus Hockey assault
