= Ron Lapointe Trophy =

The Ron Lapointe Trophy is awarded annually by the Quebec Maritimes Junior Hockey League to the "Coach of the Year." The award is named for Ron Lapointe.

== Winners ==
List of "Coach of the Year" winners. Winners in bold also won the Brian Kilrea Coach of the Year Award.

Season	Coach	Team
1992–93	Guy Chouinard	Sherbrooke Faucons
1993–94	Richard Martel	Saint-Hyacinthe Laser
1994–95	Michel Therrien	Laval Titan Collège Français
1995–96	Jean Pronovost	Shawinigan Cataractes
1996–97	Clément Jodoin	Halifax Mooseheads
1997–98	Guy Chouinard	Québec Remparts
1998–99	**Guy Chouinard**	Québec Remparts
1999–2000	Doris Labonté	Rimouski Océanic
2000–01	Denis Francoeur	Shawinigan Cataractes
2001–02	Réal Paiement	Acadie-Bathurst Titan
2002–03	Shawn MacKenzie	Halifax Mooseheads
2003–04	Benoit Groulx	Gatineau Olympiques
2004–05	Richard Martel	Chicoutimi Saguenéens
2005–06	André Tourigny	Rouyn-Noranda Huskies
2006–07	**Clément Jodoin**	Lewiston MAINEiacs
2007–08	Pascal Vincent	Cape Breton Screaming Eagles
2008–09	Danny Flynn	Moncton Wildcats
2009–10	Gerard Gallant	Saint John Sea Dogs
2010–11	Gerard Gallant	Saint John Sea Dogs
2011–12	Jean-François Houle	Blainville-Boisbriand Armada
2012–13	Dominique Ducharme	Halifax Mooseheads
2013–14	Éric Veilleux	Baie-Comeau Drakkar
2014–15	Joël Bouchard	Blainville-Boisbriand Armada
2015–16	**Gilles Bouchard**	Rouyn-Noranda Huskies
2016–17	Danny Flynn	Saint John Sea Dogs
2017–18	Joël Bouchard	Blainville-Boisbriand Armada
2018–19	**Mario Pouliot**	Rouyn-Noranda Huskies
2019–20	Stéphane Julien	Sherbrooke Phoenix
2020–21	Jim Hulton	Charlottetown Islanders
2021–22	**Jim Hulton**	Charlottetown Islanders
2022–23	Stéphane Julien	Sherbrooke Phoenix
2023–24	Jean-François Grégoire	Baie-Comeau Drakkar
2024–25	**Gardiner MacDougall**	Moncton Wildcats
2025–26	Sylvain Favreau	Drummondville Voltigeurs

== See also ==
- Brian Kilrea Coach of the Year Award
