= Cole Harbour =

Cole Harbour may refer to the following places:

- Cole Harbour (natural harbour), Nova Scotia, Canada
- Cole Harbour, Nova Scotia, Canada, a community
  - Cole Harbour (electoral district), a Nova Scotia provincial electoral district
- Cole Harbour, Guysborough County, Nova Scotia, Canada, a community
- Cole Harbour 30, a Mi'kmaq reserve in Nova Scotia, Canada
- Coleharbor, North Dakota, United States

== See also ==
- Coal Harbour (disambiguation)
- Coldharbour (disambiguation)
- Cole (disambiguation)
- Coral Harbour, Nunavut, Canada
- Cole (disambiguation)
- Harbor (disambiguation)
- Cole Harbour-Eastern Passage, a provincial electoral district in Nova Scotia, Canada
- Dartmouth—Cole Harbour, a federal electoral district in Nova Scotia, Canada
- Dartmouth-Cole Harbour (provincial electoral district) in Nova Scotia, Canada
