= Coldharbour =

Coldharbour /ˈkoʊldhɑːrbər/, Cold Harbour, or Cold Harbor may refer to:

== Places ==
=== England ===
- Coldharbour, Buckinghamshire, a civil parish including Fairford Leys
- Coldharbour, Cornwall
- Cold Harbour, Lincolnshire, a hamlet near Old Somerby
- Coldharbour, City of London
- Coldharbour, Greenwich, London
- Coldharbour (Lambeth ward), London
- Coldharbour, Havering, London
- Coldharbour, Tower Hamlets, London
- Coldharbour, Surrey
- Cold Harbour, Wiltshire, a hamlet of Great Hinton

=== United States ===
- Cold Harbor, Virginia
  - Cold Harbor National Cemetery, at the site of the Battle of Cold Harbor
  - Battle of Cold Harbor, American Civil War

== Arts and entertainment ==
- Cold Harbour (novel), a 1990 novel by Jack Higgins
- Cold Harbour, a 1924 novel by Francis Brett Young
- Cold Harbour (film), 2013 South African crime thriller
- Coldharbour, a fictional town in The Silver Sequence young adult fantasy novels
- Coldharbour, a fictional realm in The Elder Scrolls video game series
- Coldharbour Recordings, a sublabel of Armada Music
- "Cold Harbor", an episode of the 2025 television series Severance

== See also ==
- Coral Harbour, Nunavut, Canada
- Coal Harbour (disambiguation)
- Cole Harbour (disambiguation)
- Coldharbour Mill Working Wool Museum, an industrial museum in Uffculme, Devon, England
