= Coal Harbour (disambiguation) =

Coal Harbour is a section of Burrard Inlet in Vancouver, Canada.

Coal Harbour may also refer to:

- Coal Harbour (Vancouver Island), Canada, a harbour and community, former location of RCAF Coal Harbour and Coal Harbour whaling station
  - Coal Harbour Water Aerodrome
- Vancouver Harbour Flight Centre, formerly Vancouver Coal Harbour Seaplane Base, Vancouver, Canada
- Coal Harbour (South Georgia)

== See also ==
- Coldharbour (disambiguation)
- Cole Harbour (disambiguation)
- Coral Harbour, Nunavut, Canada
- Fuelling station, or coaling station, a repository of fuel
- Coalport (disambiguation)
