= MacKenzie Weegar =

Canadian ice hockey player (born 1994)

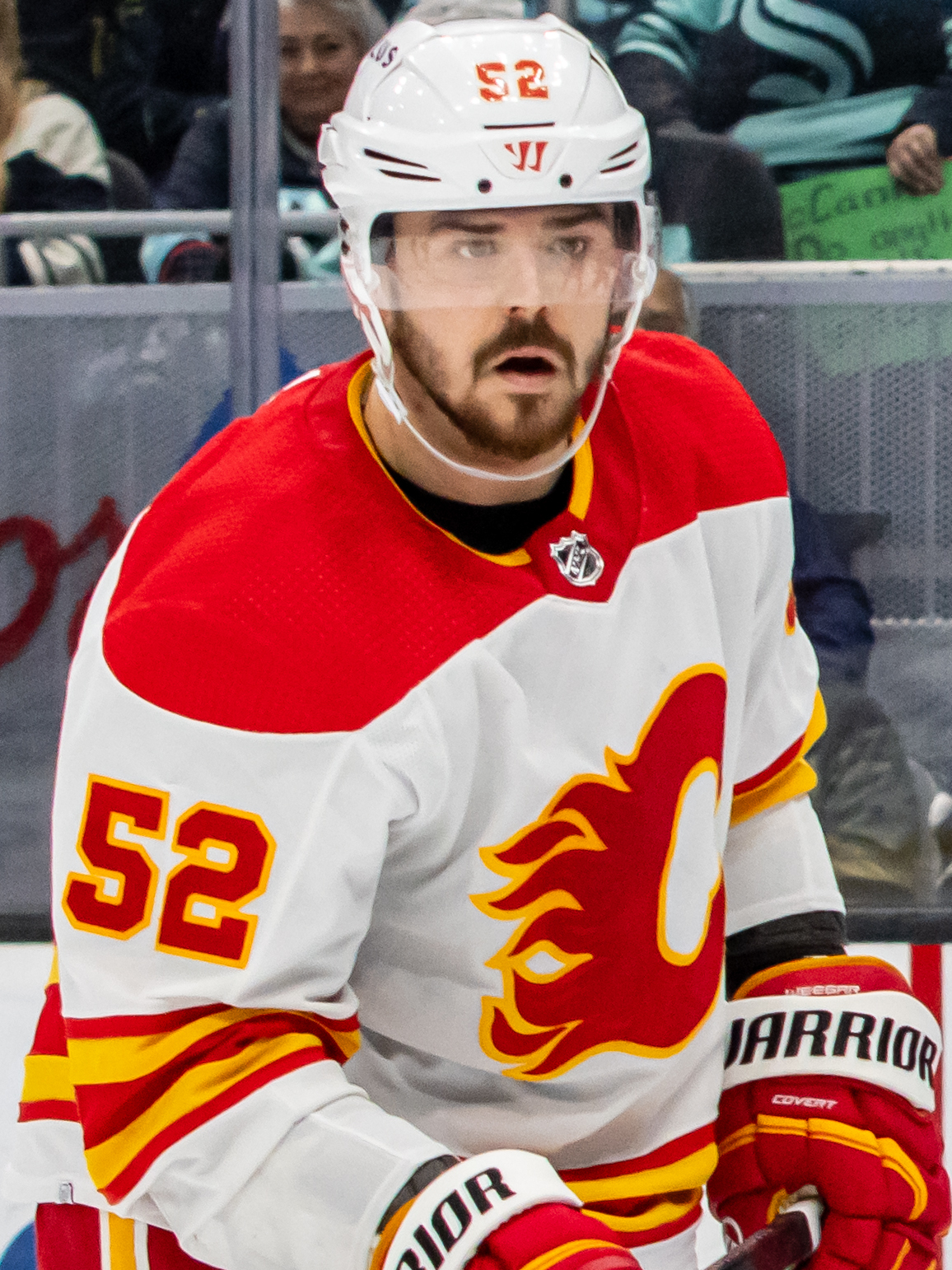
- Weegar with the Calgary Flames in 2023
- Born: January 7, 1994 (age 32) Ottawa, Ontario, Canada
- Height: 6 ft 0 in (183 cm)
- Weight: 210 lb (95 kg; 15 st 0 lb)
- Position: Defence
- Shoots: Right
- NHL team Former teams: Utah Mammoth; Florida Panthers; Calgary Flames
- National team: Canada
- NHL draft: 206th overall, 2013; Florida Panthers
- Playing career: 2014–present

MacKenzie Weegar (born January 7, 1994) is a Canadian professional ice hockey player who is a defenceman for the Utah Mammoth of the National Hockey League (NHL). Weegar was drafted by the Florida Panthers with the 206th overall pick in the 2013 NHL entry draft.

== Playing career ==
=== Amateur ===
Weegar played major junior hockey with the Halifax Mooseheads in the Quebec Major Junior Hockey League. After his selection to the Panthers, Weegar was signed following his second season with the Mooseheads in 2013–14 to a three-year, entry-level deal on May 29, 2014.

=== Professional ===
==== Florida Panthers organization ====
Following the signing, Weegar participated in the 2014 Prospect Tournament alongside fellow Panthers rookies Logan Shaw and Vincent Trocheck. After participating in the Panthers' five preseason games, Weegar was re-assigned to their American Hockey League (AHL) affiliate, the San Antonio Rampage, to start the 2014–15 season. Although he missed a few early games due to an upper-body injury, Weegar earned his first AHL point with an assist on October 24, 2014. He would later score his first professional goal during a 3–0 win over the Iowa Wild on December 12. Within his first 19 games with the club, Weegar accumulated one goal and four assists. In late January, Weegar was re-assigned to the Panthers ECHL affiliate, the Cincinnati Cyclones. In his first five games with the Cyclones, he tallied one goal and three assists for four points. Weegar added one more assist in his next six games and was recalled to the AHL on February 5. He was returned to the ECHL a few games later but quickly returned to the AHL. Upon rejoining the Rampage, he played alongside Shayne Taker and Josh McFadden. Weegar finished the 2014–15 season with two goals and eight assists for 10 points through 31 AHL games.

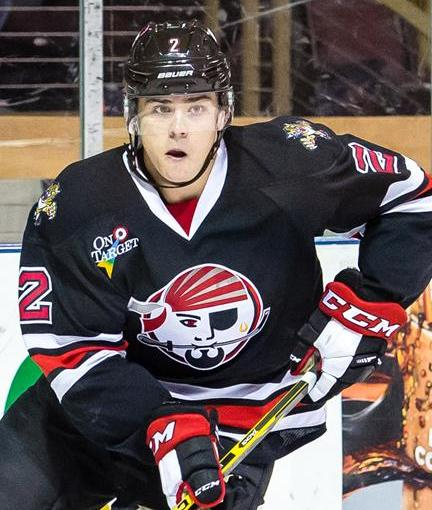
Weegar with the Portland Pirates in 2015

During the 2015 offseason, the Panthers signed a multi-year player development deal with the Portland Pirates to make them their new AHL affiliate. Weegar again participated in the Panthers' rookie tournament before being assigned to the Portland Pirates for the 2015–16 season. He scored his first career goal with the Pirates on October 30 in a loss to the Rochester Americans. Although the Pirates qualified for the 2016 Calder Cup playoffs, Weegar remainder a healthy scratch as they were eliminated by the Hershey Bears.

Entering the final year of his entry-level contract, Weegar returned to the Panthers' new AHL affiliate, the Springfield Thunderbirds, for the 2016–17 season. Despite missing 10 games during the season, Weegar proved to be one of the Thunderbirds' best players and most prolific goal scorer. He scored his first goal and assist of the season on October 16 to help lead the Thunderbirds to their first regular season win in franchise history. On October 26, Weegar scored the game-winning goal in overtime to add to his team-leading four points to lead the Thunderbirds to their first home victory. By January 10, Weegar had accumulated eight goals and six assists for 14 points. As a result of his accomplishments, he became the first Springfield Thunderbird to participate in the AHL All-Star Game. Following the All-Star Game, Weegar continued to produce points and led all team defencemen with 12 goals and 29 points through 51 games. On April 3, 2017, Weegar received his first call up to the NHL level as a replacement for Aaron Ekblad. He subsequently made his NHL debut with the Panthers that night in a 4–1 loss to the Montreal Canadiens. He recorded one shot on goals, two hits, and served a minor penalty while playing 16:45 of ice time. After playing in three games with Florida, and recording four penalty minutes and three shots on goal, Weegar was returned to the Springfield Thunderbirds. He finished the season leading all team defencemen with 14 goals and 22 assists for 36 and points through 60 games. Ahead of the 2017 NHL Expansion Draft, the Panthers left Weegar available to be chosen by the Vegas Golden Knights. After he remained unpicked, they signed him to a one-year, two-way contract on August 3.

In the first year of his new contract, Weegar stayed at the NHL level for the entirety of the 2017–18 season. Although he was named to their opening night roster, Weegar served as a healthy scratch through the first five games of the season. He eventually made his season debut on October 20 and subsequently scored his first career NHL goal that night against the Pittsburgh Penguins. While he struggled to score again, Weegar worked with former NHL defenceman Chris Pronger to improve his defensive game. As he began to improve, coach Bob Boughner responded by gifting him time as the second defenceman on the second power-play unit. Although he was inconsistent with his scoring, Weegar's defensive play continued to earn him praise from Boughner. During a 3–2 road win over the New Jersey Devils in November, Boughner moved Weegar up to the second defensive pairing with Mike Matheson and he played 20 minutes of ice time. As the season continued, Weegar and Ian McCoshen rotated through the Panthers third defensive pairing with Alexander Petrovic. Overall, Weegar played 8:19:10 minutes of ice time with Petrovic and they both finished the season with two goals apiece and combined for 17 assists. As a restricted free agent, Weegar signed a one-year, one-way contract extension with the Panthers on July 25, 2018.

Weegar improved offensively for the Panthers during the 2018–19 season and set new career highs in goals, assists, and games played while also averaging a career-best 16:58 of ice time. Although he missed the majority of training camp due to a shoulder injury, Weegar was named to the Panthers opening night roster for the second consecutive season. However, he was scratched for the first two games in favor of rookie Jacob MacDonald. Throughout the majority of the 2018-19 campaign, Weegar played a lot on the bottom pair but was occasionally rewarded with some playing time in the top four. While playing alongside Bogdan Kiselevich on the Panthers third pairing, Weegar averaged just over 14 minutes per game and was absent from the power play or penalty killing unit. However, after the NHL All-Star break, Weegar began consistently playing alongside Keith Yandle on the Panthers second defensive pairing. On January 15, Weegar suffered a concussion and missed four games after a hit by Candadiens left winger Paul Byron. Upon returning from the injury, he began to hit his stride and tallied three goals, five assists, 49 hits and 41 blocked shots over his final 18 games. During the 220:04 that Weegar and Yandle shared the ice at 5-on-5, the Panthers led the opposition in goals (11-6), shots (116-100) and attempts (226-200).

Although the Panthers began the 2019–20 season dropping two out of three games, Weegar was strong from the start. When new head coach Joel Quenneville put Weegar and Aaron Ekblad on their top unit, they combined for 5 points, 14 shots on goal and a plus-6 rating over three games. By the end of October, he led all Panthers defencemen with three goals and nine points while playing on their top pairing with Ekblad. Weegar's 58.43 Corsi-for percentage was also the third-best among defenceman at 5-on-5 play. However, he shortly thereafter suffered an upper body injury and subsequently missed eight games. At the time of the injury on November 10, Weegar had accumulated three goals and seven assists while averaging 19:57 of ice time over 17 games. He returned to the Panthers roster on November 30 and recorded two hits, two blocks and a plus-2 rating over 19:51 minutes of ice time. However, Weegar suffered another upper-body injury on December 28 and subsequently missed another 15 games to recover. When he returned to the lineup on February 4, 2020, he recorded one shot, two hits, one block and one takeaway in 13:29 of ice time alongside Keith Yandle. He immediately resumed his scoring touch and quickly set new career-highs with seven goals and 11 assists for 18 points.

Once the NHL resumed play for the 2020 Stanley Cup qualifiers, Weegar returned to the Panthers for their series against the New York Islanders. Although he sat out for their exhibition loss to the Tampa Bay Lightning, Weegar and Ekblad were expected to return to the lineup for Game 1 of the Stanley Cup Qualifiers. Weegar made his NHL postseason debut on August 1, 2020, during Game 1 of the Qualifiers. He tallied an assist in that game as the Panthers fell 2–1 to the Islanders. After the Panthers were eliminated from playoff contention, Weegar signed a three-year contract extension to remain with the team.

==== Calgary Flames ====
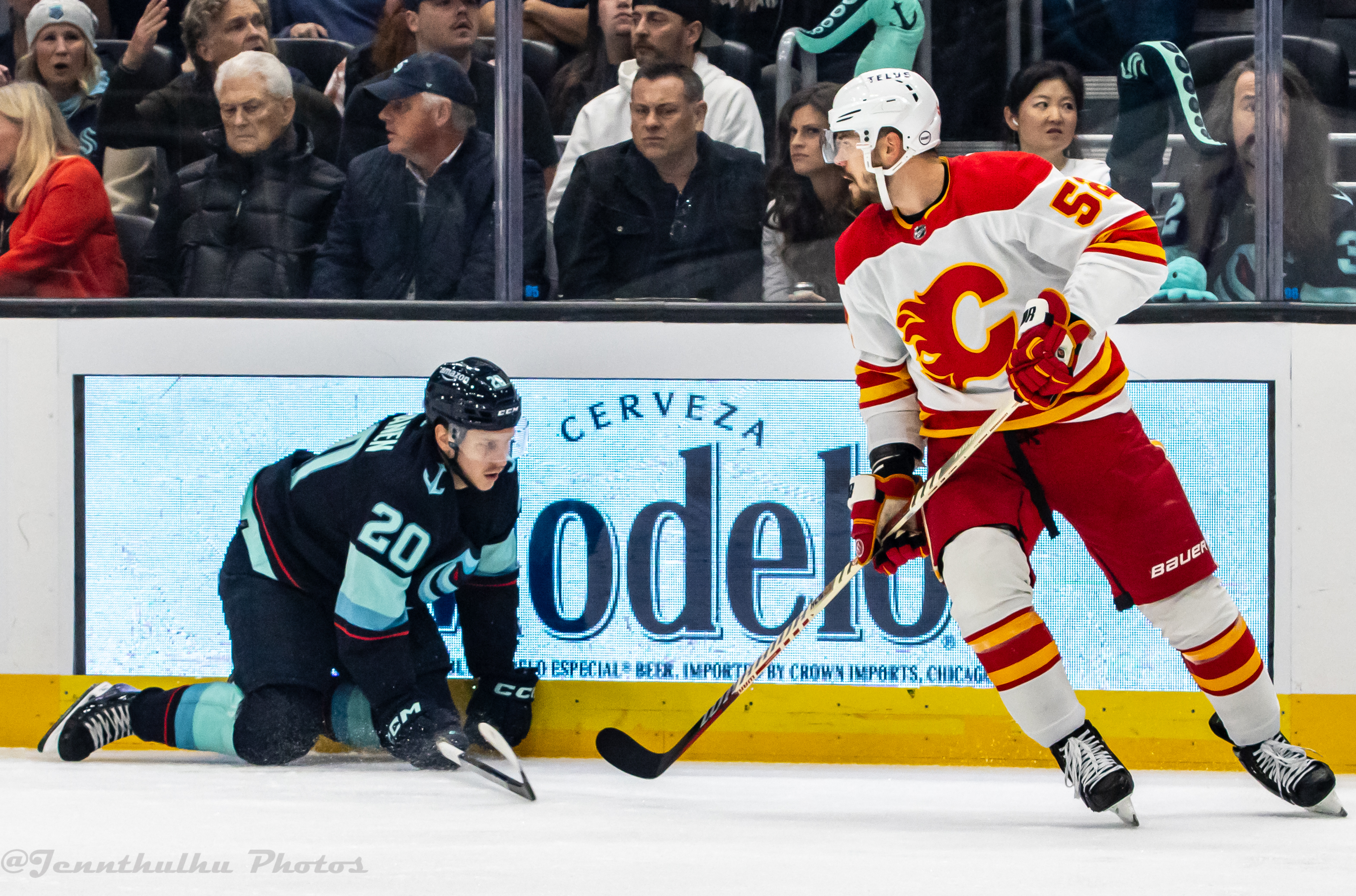
Weegar (right) as a member of the Calgary Flames in a game against the Seattle Kraken in 2023.

On July 22, 2022, Weegar was included in the blockbuster trade for the Panthers along with Jonathan Huberdeau, Cole Schwindt and a conditional 2025 first-round selection (Cullen Potter) to the Calgary Flames in exchange for Matthew Tkachuk and a conditional fourth-round selection in 2025 (Mads Kongsbak Klyvo).

==== Utah Mammoth ====
During the 2025–26 season, in his fourth year with the Flames and with the club transitioning to a rebuild, Weegar accepted a trade to the Utah Mammoth in exchange for Olli Määttä, Jonathan Castagna, and 3 second-round selections in 2026 on March 4, 2026.

== International play ==
Medal record

Representing Canada

Ice hockey

World Championships
Gold medal – first place	2023 Finland/Latvia	

Following the Flames not qualifying for the 2023 Stanley Cup playoffs, Weegar accepted his first invitation to join Team Canada for the 2023 IIHF World Championship. Recording three goals and eight assists in ten games, he led the team and all defencemen in the tournament in points on the way to winning a gold medal. He was named Best Defenceman of the event by the IIHF directorate, as well as to the Media All-Star Team.

== Personal life ==
Weegar is the first cousin of former NHL player and current broadcaster Craig Rivet. Weegar wears uniform number 52, the same number Rivet wore during his career.

Weegar married his fiancé Maggie Wallace on July 27th, 2025.

== Career statistics ==
=== Regular season and playoffs ===
			Regular season					Playoffs
Season	Team	League	GP	G	A	Pts	PIM	GP	G	A	Pts	PIM
2010–11	Winchester Hawks	EOJHL	40	10	23	33	94	—	—	—	—	—
2010–11	Nepean Raiders	CCHL	5	0	2	2	0	—	—	—	—	—
2011–12	Nepean Raiders	CCHL	53	13	37	50	61	18	2	4	6	24
2012–13	Halifax Mooseheads	QMJHL	62	8	36	44	58	17	0	5	5	10
2013–14	Halifax Mooseheads	QMJHL	61	12	47	59	97	16	5	17	22	14
2014–15	San Antonio Rampage	AHL	31	2	8	10	40	—	—	—	—	—
2014–15	Cincinnati Cyclones	ECHL	21	1	12	13	13	—	—	—	—	—
2015–16	Portland Pirates	AHL	62	7	17	24	60	1	0	0	0	0
2016–17	Springfield Thunderbirds	AHL	60	14	22	36	70	—	—	—	—	—
2016–17	Florida Panthers	NHL	3	0	0	0	4	—	—	—	—	—
2017–18	Florida Panthers	NHL	60	2	6	8	32	—	—	—	—	—
2018–19	Florida Panthers	NHL	64	4	11	15	64	—	—	—	—	—
2019–20	Florida Panthers	NHL	45	7	11	18	33	4	0	1	1	4
2020–21	Florida Panthers	NHL	54	6	30	36	45	6	1	2	3	6
2021–22	Florida Panthers	NHL	80	8	36	44	81	10	0	1	1	10
2022–23	Calgary Flames	NHL	81	4	27	31	43	—	—	—	—	—
2023–24	Calgary Flames	NHL	82	20	32	52	51	—	—	—	—	—
2024–25	Calgary Flames	NHL	81	8	39	47	33	—	—	—	—	—
2025–26	Calgary Flames	NHL	60	3	18	21	69	—	—	—	—	—
2025–26	Utah Mammoth	NHL	19	1	6	7	19	6	2	3	5	2
NHL totals			629	63	216	279	474	26	3	7	10	22

=== International ===
Year	Team	Event	Result	GP	G	A	Pts	PIM
2023	Canada	WC	1st place, gold medalist(s)	10	3	8	11	6
2025	Canada	WC	5th	8	0	1	1	6
Senior totals				18	3	9	12	12

== Awards and honours ==
Award	Year	Ref
AHL
AHL All-Star Game	2016–17	
CCHL
Rookie of the Year	2012	
Second All-Star Team	2012	
Top Prospect Award	2012	
QMJHL
All-Rookie Team	2013	
Best plus-minus (+55)	2013	
Memorial Cup champion	2013	
Second All-Star Team	2014	
International
World Championship Best Defenceman	2023	
World Championship Media All-Star Team	2023	
