= Éric Veilleux =

Canadian ice hockey player and coach

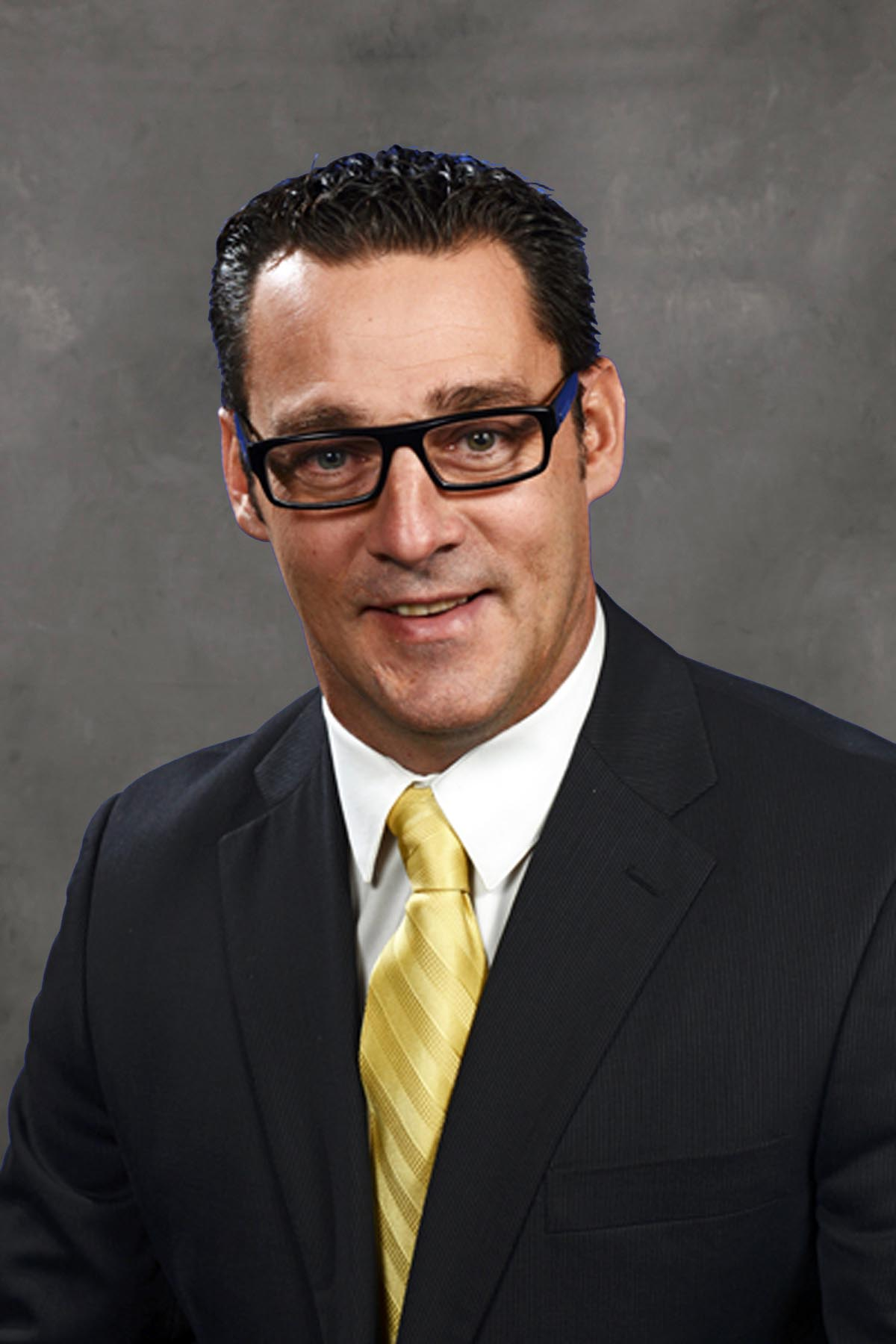
- Veilleux in 2016
- Born: February 20, 1972 (age 54) Quebec City, Quebec, Canada
- Height: 5 ft 9 in (175 cm)
- Weight: 165 lb (75 kg; 11 st 11 lb)
- Position: Centre
- Shot: Left
- Played for: Cornwall Aces; Hershey Bears; SaiPa; Kentucky Thoroughblades; Manitoba Moose; Lowell Lock Monsters
- NHL draft: Undrafted
- Playing career: 1993–2001

Éric Veilleux (born February 20, 1972) is a Canadian former professional ice hockey forward. Veilleux spent most of his professional career in the American Hockey League. He is the head coach of the Quebec Remparts of the QMJHL

== Coaching career ==
For the 2015–16 season, he was the head coach with the Norfolk Admirals of the ECHL following a season as an assistant coach with the American Hockey League's Norfolk Admirals. In May 2016, he was named the head coach and general manager of the Victoriaville Tigres of the Quebec Major Junior Hockey League before being hired to coach the Colorado Avalanche's AHL affiliate, the San Antonio Rampage, on July 6, 2016.

He coached the Rampage for two seasons, finishing out of the playoffs in both occasions, before leaving the club and Avalanche organization following the 2017–18 season.

He returned to the QMJHL as the head coach of the Halifax Mooseheads for the 2018–19 season.

After a successful season, he returned to the AHL to become an assistant coach with the Syracuse Crunch.

On July 6, 2023, Veilleux was hired as the new head coach of the Quebec Remparts, succeeding Patrick Roy.

== Career statistics ==
			Regular season					Playoffs
Season	Team	League	GP	G	A	Pts	PIM	GP	G	A	Pts	PIM
1989–90	Hawkesbury Hawks	CJHL	55	33	68	101	127	—	—	—	—	—
1990–91	Hawkesbury Hawks	CJHL	55	33	52	85	116	—	—	—	—	—
1991–92	Laval Titan	QMJHL	60	31	40	71	87	10	3	5	8	31
1992–93	Laval Titan	QMJHL	70	55	70	125	100	13	9	11	20	19
1993–94	Cornwall Aces	AHL	77	8	19	27	69	13	1	7	8	20
1994–95	Cornwall Aces	AHL	70	13	23	36	93	13	1	1	2	20
1995–96	Cornwall Aces	AHL	71	25	35	60	119	8	2	6	8	2
1996–97	Hershey Bears	AHL	68	28	33	61	118	23	11	10	21	14
1997–98	Hershey Bears	AHL	78	24	38	62	127	7	4	2	6	8
1998–99	SaiPa	SM-l	9	1	2	3	14	—	—	—	—	—
1998–99	Kentucky Thoroughblades	AHL	68	8	25	33	114	6	0	2	2	6
1999-00	Manitoba Moose	IHL	73	14	13	27	102	2	0	1	1	2
2000–01	Lowell Lock Monsters	AHL	15	0	1	1	22	—	—	—	—	—
AHL totals			447	106	174	280	662	70	19	28	47	70

== Awards and honours ==
Award	Year
AHL
Calder Cup (Hershey Bears)	1997
QMJHL
Ron Lapointe Trophy – Coach of the Year	2013–14
