= Sam Simon (businessman) =

Armenian-American businessman

- Occupations: Entrepreneur; Business executive
- Employer: Simon Group Holdings
- Title: Founder, Chairman, and Owner

Sam Simon is an Armenian-American businessman. Simon is the founder and chairman of Atlas Oil, which is a portfolio company of Simon Group Holdings, a holding company that includes 120 different companies and direct investments. Simon is also the owner of the Simon Family Estate winery, the Halifax Mooseheads and a shareholder and board member of the Ipswich Town Football Club.

== Early life ==
Sam Simon's family is of Armenian descent. They emigrated to Detroit from Iraq via Lebanon in 1973, when Sam was nine years old. The family received $200 from the Armenian Catholic Church to help fund their flights to America, which Simon helped pay off by working neighborhood jobs and assisting his father, Ramzi, at a local gas station. Eventually, Simon's father founded an ice sales business through the gas station. The company became the second largest ice distributor in Michigan, expanding its clients to bars, marinas, drug stores, party stores, and other service stations. The Simons sold the ice business and purchased a closed gas station, which grew to a chain of additional stations.

== Atlas Oil ==
Simon founded Atlas Oil in 1985 at the age of 19, with a single delivery truck that he purchased with a $30,000 cash advance on his credit card. Atlas is headquartered in Houston. In 2014, Atlas delivered about 1 billion gallons of fuel annually to both commercial and retail customers, including Marathon, Clark, CITGO, Phillips 66, and Valero. They also provide crude hauling and transloading, as well as renewable fuels, including ethanol, biodiesel, and diesel exhaust fluid. Atlas is also involved in emergency fueling, including aiding in disaster relief efforts after Hurricane Florence, Hurricane Michael, and Superstorm Sandy. Other clients have included data centers, hospitals, corporate headquarters, cell towers, and energy plants.

As of 2023, Atlas Oil has approximately 700 employees and several billion dollars a year in sales. The company has received two Health & Safety Excellence Awards from the Texas Oil and Gas Awards and has been ranked a top place to work in the state by the Detroit Free Press. In 2026, Atlas Oil was the second largest privately held company in the State of Michigan with $8.8 billion in annual revenues.

== Simon Group Holdings ==
Atlas Oil is held under Simon Group Holdings (SGH), which houses Simon's interests in diversified energy, real estate, aerospace and defense, sports, media, and entertainment, as well as wines and spirits. It has more than 120 companies and direct investments, with Atlas Oil as Simon Group Holdings’ inaugural business. In 2018, SGH co-founded VESTA Modular, which manufactures modular housing units. He sold the business to Balmoral Funds LLC in 2018.

SGH acquired Plum Gas Solutions in 2023. The company is located in the Province of Alberta and manufactures natural gas systems – including their proprietary Pressure Regulation Systems. SGH also owns Fuel Automation Station, a could-based fueling and logistics company, and ETI Tech, an Ohio-based aeronautics company that provides parts for aircraft.

== Simon Family Estate ==
Sam Simon joined The Napa Valley Reserve in 2003. He then founded Simon Family Estate with Maayan Koschitzky as the winemaker in 2017, releasing their first vintages in 2019. Its initial grapes were sourced from St. Helena, Oakville and Coombsville. The winery first focused on Cabernet Sauvignon varietals, with their 2021 Reserve Cabernet Sauvignon being awarded a score of 100 by Decanter magazine. The company acquired Collinetta Vineyard in Napa Valley in February 2025. Its wines are produced at Eleven Eleven Wines, and they have a private tasting salon in Napa.

== Sports ownership ==
In 2023, Simon became the majority owner of the QMJHL hockey team the Halifax Mooseheads. Previous owner, former NHL star Bobby Smith, had said that he was not actively shopping ownership of his team, but made the decision to sell after Simon approached him regarding a potential acquisition of the team. Simon had previously been in the running to purchase the Detroit Pistons twenty years prior. His son, Peter, is involved in the management of the Mooseheads. Simon purchased the remaining 15% of the team in 2024, making the family its sole owners under Simon Sports, a sports investment company of which Peter Simon serves as president. Simon Sports is based in Birmingham, Michigan and holds a portfolio of sports-related investments. That year, Simon Sports became a shareholder and board member of the Ipswich Town Football Club of the English Premier League.

== Personal life ==
Simon received the Ernst & Young Entrepreneur of the Year award in 1999. In 2014, he was appointed to the National Petroleum Council by Secretary of Energy Spencer Abraham and sat on its advisory board. Simon and his wife, Nada, founded the philanthropic organization the Sam & Nada Foundation. Sam and Nada have twin sons, Michael and Peter.
