= Dominique Ducharme =

Canadian ice hockey player and coach

- Born: March 12, 1973 (age 53) Notre-Dame-des-Prairies, Quebec, Canada
- Height: 5 ft 11 in (180 cm)
- Position: Forward
- Shot: Left
- Played for: Cornwall Aces; Orques d'Anglet
- Coached for: Montreal Canadiens
- NHL draft: Undrafted
- Playing career: 1995–2002
- Coaching career: 2002–Present

Dominique Ducharme (born March 12, 1973) is a Canadian professional ice hockey coach and former player who is currently an assistant coach for the Vegas Golden Knights of the National Hockey League (NHL). Previously, he served as head coach of the Montreal Canadiens for parts of two seasons between 2020–21 and 2021–22.

== Playing career ==
Ducharme had a standout collegiate career playing for the Vermont Catamounts of the National Collegiate Athletic Association (NCAA). Collectively, he ranks ninth all-time in team history for points (149), and seventh all-time in assists (93), playing alongside the likes of future NHLers and Stanley Cup champions Martin St. Louis and Tim Thomas.

Following graduation, Ducharme began his professional career splitting time between the Raleigh IceCaps and Huntington Blizzard of the ECHL along with the Cornwall Aces of the American Hockey League (AHL) in 1995–96. He then embarked on a five-year career across the various French leagues, before retiring from active play in 2002.

== Coaching career ==
After retiring as a player, Ducharme spent one season as a coach for the University of Quebec at Trois-Rivieres in 2002–03. The following year, Ducharme assumed his first head coaching role, working with his hometown junior team, the Joliette L'Action in the Quebec Junior AAA Hockey League (QMAAA). He stayed there until 2008, when he accepted a position as an assistant coach with the Montreal Junior Hockey Club in the Quebec Major Junior Hockey League (QMJHL), prior to joining the Halifax Mooseheads in 2011.

Ducharme's first season with the Mooseheads saw the team finish sixth overall in the QMJHL, and second in the Maritimes Division reaching the semifinals of the President's Cup. In 2012–13, with a roster featuring top NHL Draft prospects like Nathan MacKinnon and Jonathan Drouin, Ducharme and the Mooseheads went 58–6–3–1, registering 347 goals for and only 176 goals against. In the 2013 President's Cup playoffs, Halifax lost just one game to capture its first QMJHL title in team history. With automatic entry in the 2013 Memorial Cup tournament, the Mooseheads defeated the Portland Winterhawks 6–4, to win its first Memorial Cup, and become the third-straight QMJHL team to win the tournament in as many years. For his efforts, Ducharme was awarded with the Ron Lapointe Trophy as the league's Coach of the Year.

Following the 2015–16 QMJHL season, Ducharme resigned his position with the Mooseheads and joined Drummondville as both head coach and general manager.

Ducharme has also been involved with Hockey Canada, first assisting on Quebec in the 2011 World Under-17 Hockey Challenge, and as an assistant coach for the Canada Under-18 National Team at the 2013 Ivan Hlinka Memorial Tournament. Ducharme served as the head coach for Canada during the 2017 World Junior Ice Hockey Championships, leading the team to a silver medal, and the 2018 World Junior Ice Hockey Championships, leading them to gold.

On April 27, 2018, Ducharme was hired as an assistant coach by the Montreal Canadiens, following the firings of J. J. Daigneault and Daniel Lacroix.

On February 24, 2021, Ducharme was promoted to interim head coach by the Canadiens, following the termination of predecessor Claude Julien and associate coach Kirk Muller.

On June 19, 2021, Ducharme tested positive for COVID-19, placing him in isolation for 14 days; he continued work through phone calls and video calls, talking with the coaching staff and players as they won their semifinal playoff series against the Vegas Golden Knights, advancing to the 2021 Stanley Cup Finals. On July 2, Ducharme rejoined the team for morning skate ahead of Game 3 of the Stanley Cup Finals. In the first Stanley Cup Finals game at the Bell Centre the Canadiens were defeated by the Tampa Bay Lightning by a score of 6–3. The Canadiens would ultimately lose the series 4 games to 1.

On July 13, 2021, Ducharme was formally named the 31st head coach in Canadiens history, signing a three-year extension with the team.

On February 9, 2022, Ducharme was fired as head coach of the Montreal Canadiens; at the time of his departure, the Canadiens held a record of 8–30–7, last overall in the NHL.

On July 12, 2023, Ducharme was hired as an assistant coach for the Vegas Golden Knights.

== Career statistics ==
=== Regular season and playoffs ===
| | | | Regular season | | | | | Playoffs |
| Season | Team | League | GP | G | A | Pts | PIM | GP | G | A | Pts | PIM |
|---|---|---|---|---|---|---|---|---|---|---|---|---|
| 1991–92 | University of Vermont | ECAC | 31 | 13 | 19 | 32 | 20 | — | — | — | — | — |
| 1992–93 | University of Vermont | ECAC | 31 | 16 | 22 | 38 | 18 | — | — | — | — | — |
| 1993–94 | University of Vermont | ECAC | 33 | 12 | 31 | 43 | 26 | — | — | — | — | — |
| 1994–95 | University of Vermont | ECAC | 35 | 13 | 23 | 36 | 28 | — | — | — | — | — |
| 1995–96 | Raleigh IceCaps | ECHL | 6 | 1 | 2 | 3 | 0 | — | — | — | — | — |
| 1995–96 | Huntington Blizzard | ECHL | 13 | 5 | 3 | 8 | 2 | — | — | — | — | — |
| 1995–96 | Cornwall Aces | AHL | 5 | 1 | 1 | 2 | 6 | — | — | — | — | — |
| 1996–97 | Toulouse-Blagnac | France3 | 27 | 56 | 49 | 105 | 46 | — | — | — | — | — |
| 1997–98 | Cergy-Pontoise | France3 | 28 | 73 | 68 | 141 | 40 | — | — | — | — | — |
| 1998–99 | Cergy-Pontoise | France2 | 28 | 29 | 34 | 62 | — | — | — | — | — | — |
| 1999–00 | Orques d’Anglet | Ligue Élite | 35 | 16 | 22 | 38 | 40 | — | — | — | — | — |
| 2001–02 | Orques d'Anglet | Ligue Élite | 35 | 13 | 22 | 35 | — | — | — | — | — | — |
| AHL totals | | | 5 | 1 | 1 | 2 | 6 | — | — | — | — | — |

== Head coaching record ==
=== NHL ===
| Team | Year | Regular season | | | | | | Postseason | | | |
| Team | Year | G | W | L | OTL | Pts | Finish | W | L | Win% | Result |
|---|---|---|---|---|---|---|---|---|---|---|---|
| Montreal Canadiens | 2020–21 | 38 | 15 | 16 | 7 | 37 | 4th in North | 13 | 9 | .591 | Lost in Stanley Cup Finals |
| Montreal Canadiens | 2021–22 | 45 | 8 | 30 | 7 | 23 | Fired | — | — | — | — |
| Total | | 83 | 23 | 46 | 14 | | | 13 | 9 | .591 | |

=== QMJHL ===
| Team | Year | Regular season | | | | | | | Post season | | | |
| Team | Year | G | W | L | T | OTL | Pts | Finish | W | L | Win % | Result |
|---|---|---|---|---|---|---|---|---|---|---|---|---|
| Halifax Mooseheads | 2011–12 | 68 | 36 | 22 | — | 2 | 85 | 2nd in Maritimes | 10 | 7 | .588 | Lost in Semi-finals |
| Halifax Mooseheads | 2012–13 | 68 | 58 | 6 | — | 3 | 120 | 1st in Maritimes | 19 | 2 | .905 | President's Cup champions Memorial Cup champions |
| Halifax Mooseheads | 2013–14 | 68 | 48 | 18 | — | 3 | 97 | 1st in Maritimes | 11 | 5 | .688 | Lost in Semi-finals |
| Halifax Mooseheads | 2014–15 | 68 | 32 | 30 | — | 4 | 70 | 4th in Maritimes | 7 | 7 | .500 | Lost in Quarter-finals |
| Halfax Mooseheads | 2015–16 | 68 | 21 | 39 | — | 7 | 50 | 6th in Maritimes | — | — | — | Missed playoffs |
| Drummondville Voltigeurs | 2016–17 | 68 | 28 | 34 | — | 1 | 62 | 4th in West | 0 | 4 | .000 | Lost in Round 1 |
| Drummondville Voltigeurs | 2017–18 | 68 | 44 | 20 | — | 4 | 92 | 2nd in West | 5 | 5 | .500 | Lost in Quarter-finals |
| Total* | | | 255 | 158 | — | 37 | | | 52 | 26 | .667 | |

- Due to his Team Canada's stints, the total is the games he coached himself, excluding when he was with Team Canada.

== Awards and honors ==
| Award | Year |
|---|---|
| All-ECAC Hockey Rookie Team | 1991–92 |
| Ron Lapointe Trophy (QMJHL) | 2012–13 |
| Brian Kilrea Coach of the Year Award (CHL) | 2012–13 |

| Preceded by Claude Julien | Head coach of the Montreal Canadiens; 2021–2022 | Succeeded by Martin St. Louis |
