= Clément Jodoin =

Canadian ice hockey coach

- Born: January 10, 1952 (age 74) Saint-Césaire, Quebec, Canada
- Height: 5 ft 11 in (180 cm)
- Weight: 168 lb (76 kg; 12 st 0 lb)
- Position: Forward
- Shot: Left
- Played for: Rosemont National
- NHL draft: Undrafted
- Playing career: 1969–1974

Clément Jodoin (born January 10, 1952) is a Canadian former professional ice hockey player, former head coach of the Hamilton Bulldogs of the American Hockey League (AHL), a former assistant coach of the Montreal Canadiens, having previously been the head coach of the Rimouski Océanic of the Quebec Major Junior Hockey League.

== Career ==
Jodoin played junior ice hockey with Rosemont National in the QMHL during 1969–70 and 1970–71, and later with Concordia University in the CIS. Jodoin was hired as an assistant coach with the Pittsburgh Penguins for the 1987–88 NHL season, then earned his first head coaching duties with the Halifax Citadels of the American Hockey League during 1990–91 and 1991–92. Jodoin would return to the NHL as an assistant coach with the Quebec Nordiques for 1992–93 and 1993–94. When the QMHL expanded to the Maritimes, Jodoin returned to the City of Halifax as coach of the Halifax Mooseheads for their first three seasons from 1994–95 to 1996–97. Jodoin was again hired as an NHL assistant coach, this time with the Montreal Canadiens for six seasons from 1997–98 to 2002–03. Jodoin returned to the QMJHL, coaching the Lewiston Maineiacs for three seasons from 2004–05 to 2006–07. Jodoin received the Paul Dumont Trophy in the 2005–06 as "Personality of the Year."

He served as assistant coach with the Canada national junior hockey team for the 2006, 2007 and 2008 World Junior Ice Hockey Championships. Jodoin has twice been named the QMJHL's "Coach of the Year," receiving the Ron Lapointe Trophy in 1997 and 2007. The Canadian Hockey League honoured Jodoin with the Brian Kilrea Coach of the Year Award in 2007, leading the Lewiston Maineiacs to the QMJHL President's Cup and a 2007 Memorial Cup berth.

He joined the coaching staff of Rimouski Océanic in 2007 and stayed on the job until 2011, followed by a single season (2011–12) as head coach of AHL's Hamilton Bulldogs. He represented the Cantonniers of Magog Midget AAA hockey team for the 2012-2013 season as their president of honour. In 2012, he embarked on another five-year stint as assistant coach with the Montreal Canadiens. On May 29, 2017, he was named assistant coach of Eisbären Berlin of the German top-flight DEL, serving as assistant to head coach Uwe Krupp. In May 2018, the Eisbären organization promoted Jodoin to the head coaching position. Following four home losses in a row, Jodoin was relieved off his duties on December 20, 2018. In January 2019, he joined the staff of EHC Red Bull München as an assistant coach.
