= Colby Village, Nova Scotia =

Subdivision of Cole Harbour, Nova Scotia, Canada

Coordinates: 44.670°N 63.482°W

Colby Village is a subdivision of Cole Harbour, Nova Scotia, notable for being the home of Sidney Crosby and Bissett Park.

There are four schools located in Colby Village: Colby Village Elementary, Caldwell Road Elementary, Astral Drive Elementary, and Astral Drive Junior High.

The Cole Harbour Outdoor Pool and Tennis Complex is a popular summer spot for the Colby natives with swimming and tennis lessons taught daily.

== Public transport ==
Colby Village is served by Halifax Transit local bus route "59 Colby", which provides all-day service to nearby Portland Hills Terminal. In addition, two peak-hour express routes serve the community, namely: the "159 Colby Express", which links Colby Village to downtown Dartmouth, downtown Halifax, and Dalhousie University, as well as the "179 Cole Harbour Express", which connects Colby Village to the Woodside Ferry Terminal.
