= Danny Flynn (ice hockey) =

Canadian ice hockey coach

- Born: September 5, 1957 (age 69); Dartmouth, Nova Scotia, Canada
- Occupation: Ice hockey coach
- Years active: 1990 to present
- Employer: Saint John Sea Dogs
- Organization: QMJHL

Danny Flynn (born September 5, 1957) is a Canadian former ice hockey player and coach. He is currently an amateur scout for the Columbus Blue Jackets of the National Hockey League (NHL).

Flynn was the Assistant Coach of the Sault Ste. Marie Greyhounds of the Ontario Hockey League in 1993 when the team won the Memorial Cup under head coach Ted Nolan.

Flynn coached the St. Francis Xavier University men's ice hockey team to the CIS national championship in 2003–04. He was inducted into the Hall of Fame in 2010 despite illegally bringing one of his players — convicted sex offender Jarret Reid, who was also on Flynn's 1993 Memorial Cup team — over the border to participate in an all-star game between the CIAU and NCAA in 1997 while Reid was on probation. Flynn played a key role in rehabilitating Reid's public image, including arranging for Reid to receive a prestigious scholarship rewarding leadership skills and another scholarship from the Canadian Olympic Committee that Reid received based on recommendations from both Flynn and Hockey Canada.

Between 2007 and 2013, Flynn served as the head coach and general manager for the Moncton Wildcats of the QMJHL where he twice lead the Wildcats to capture the QMJHL championships. Flynn also served as an assistant coach for the Buffalo Sabres of the NHL before returning to the Canadian Hockey League to serve as head coach of the QMJHL's Saint John Sea Dogs from 2015 until 2017 and assistant coach of the Western Hockey League's Portland Winterhawks in 2017–18.

== Awards and honours ==
Award	Year
Ron Lapointe Trophy - QMJHL Coach of the Year	2008–09
