= André Tourigny =

Canadian ice hockey coach

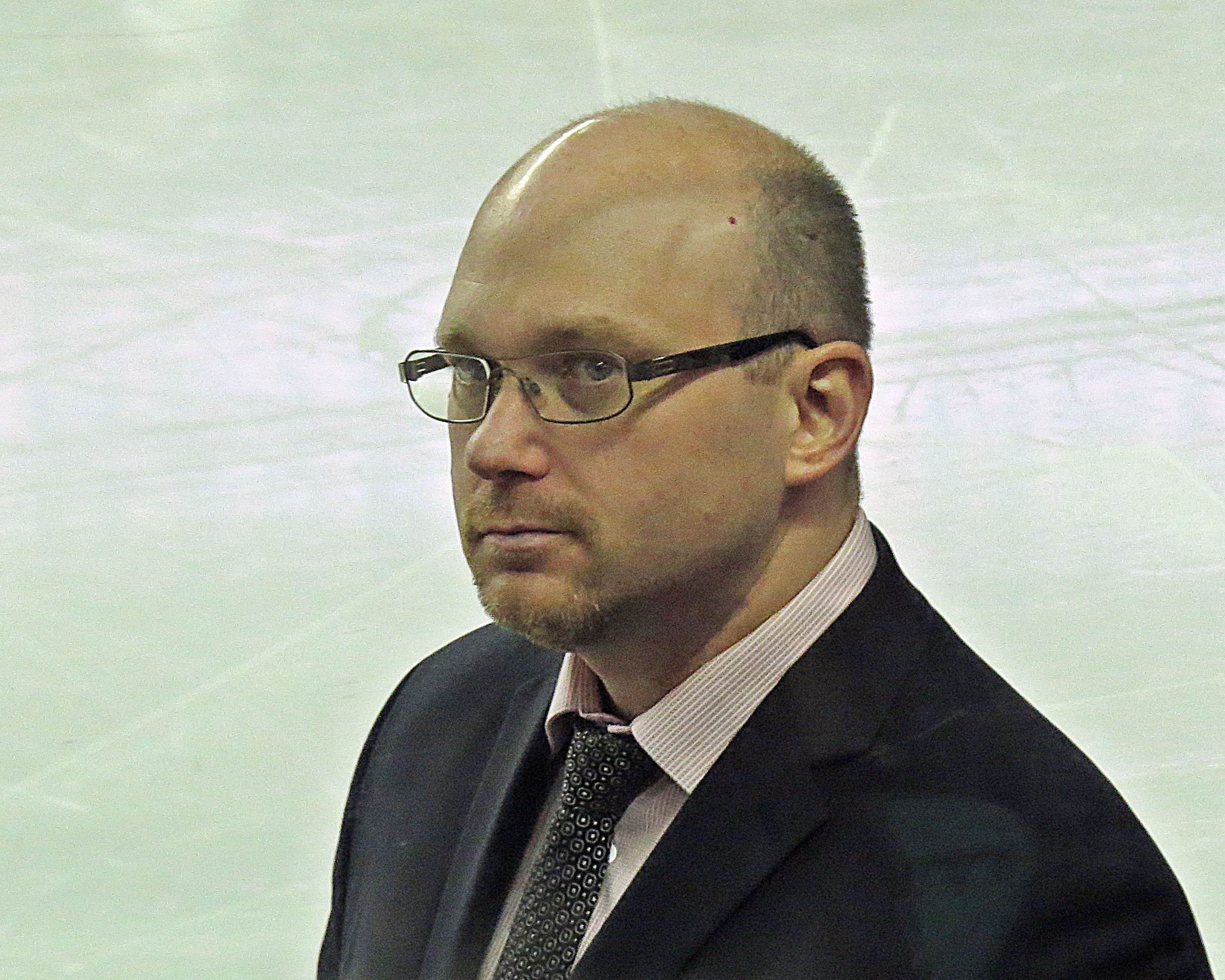
- Tourigny in 2013
- Born: May 31, 1974 (age 52) Nicolet, Quebec, Canada
- Current NHL coach: Utah Mammoth
- Coached for: Arizona Coyotes
- Coaching career: 2002–present

André Tourigny (born May 31, 1974) is a Canadian professional ice hockey coach who is the head coach for the Utah Mammoth of the National Hockey League (NHL). He previously served as head coach of the Arizona Coyotes and an assistant coach for the Ottawa Senators and Colorado Avalanche.

== Coaching career ==
From 2002 to 2013 Tourigny served as the head coach and general manager for the Rouyn-Noranda Huskies of the Quebec Major Junior Hockey League (QMJHL). Tourigny served as an assistant coach for the Canada men's national junior ice hockey team at the IIHF World U20 Championship in 2010 and 2011, helping the team to win a silver medal in both 2010 and 2011.

On June 24, 2013, Tourigny opted to pursue an NHL coaching career in accepting an assistant coaching role for fellow former QMHL coach Patrick Roy of the Colorado Avalanche. After two seasons with the Avalanche as their primary defensive coach, Tourigny, seeking a head coaching position, resigned from his position on May 17, 2015.

On July 3, 2015, Tourigny was named as an assistant coach of the Ottawa Senators. On April 12, 2016, Tourigny was fired by the Senators.

On May 2, 2016, Tourigny signed a five-year contract as the head coach of the Halifax Mooseheads of the QMJHL. He was the ninth head coach in franchise history.

On June 13, 2017, Tourigny left the Halifax Mooseheads after one season and joined the Ottawa 67's of the Ontario Hockey League (OHL) to become the head coach and vice president of hockey operations. He became the ninth head coach in the 67's history.

On July 5, 2018, Tourigny was named head coach of the Canada men's national under-18 ice hockey team for the 2018 Hlinka Gretzky Cup, where Canada took home gold.

Following a 50–12–6 record and franchise record-breaking 106 points, Tourigny was named OHL Coach of the Year after coaching the 67's to a top place finish in the regular season and an Eastern Conference Championship, where the 67's set the OHL record for 14 straight wins to start a playoff since the conference playoff format was introduced. Tourigny followed that up with his second OHL Coach of the Year with a 50–11–1 record and 101 points prior to the OHL season being cancelled. The 67's set a franchise record for consecutive wins of 15 and yet another first-place finish in the OHL regular season standings. For his efforts, Tourigny also took home the CHL Coach of the Year award.

During the 2019–20 season, Tourigny served as an assistant coach for the Canadian junior national team again at the 2020 World Junior Ice Hockey Championships, where he took home a gold medal. On January 27, 2020, Tourigny was retained as head coach for the 2021 World Junior Ice Hockey Championships. On March 24, 2021, Tourigny was signed to a one-year contract by Hockey Canada to serve as either head coach or assistant coach in various international competitions.

Tourigny discussing becoming the Arizona Coyotes coach in 2021

On July 1, 2021, Tourigny was named as head coach of the Arizona Coyotes on a three-year contract. Tourigny signed a three-year extension to his contract prior to the start of the 2023–24 season, ensuring he would remain with the club through at least 2027.

He retained his role once the Coyotes' hockey operations were transferred to the Utah Mammoth. Tourigny led Utah to 38 wins in their inaugural 2024–25 season; the team improved the next season and made the 2026 Stanley Cup playoffs as the first wildcard team in the Western Conference.

== Head coaching record ==
=== NHL ===
Team	Year	Regular season						Postseason			
Team	Year	G	W	L	OTL	Pts	Finish	W	L	Win%	Result
ARI	2021–22	82	25	50	7	57	8th in Central	—	—	—	Missed playoffs
ARI	2022–23	82	28	40	14	70	7th in Central	—	—	—	Missed playoffs
ARI	2023–24	82	36	41	5	77	7th in Central	—	—	—	Missed playoffs
UTA	2024–25	82	38	31	13	89	6th in Central	—	—	—	Missed playoffs
UTA	2025–26	82	43	33	6	92	4th in Central	2	4	.333	Lost in first round (VGK)
Total		410	170	195	45			2	4	.333	1 playoff appearance

=== QMJHL ===
Team	Year	Regular season							Postseason
Team	Year	G	W	L	T	OTL	Pts	Finish	Result
ROU	2002–03	49	23	22	0	4	50	4th in West	Lost in conference quarterfinals (0–4 vs. HUL)
ROU	2003–04	70	30	27	9	4	73	3rd in Western	Won in first round (4–3 vs. LEW); Lost in QMJHL quarterfinals (0–4 vs. GAT)
ROU	2004–05	70	31	23	11	5	78	1st in Western	Won in QMJHL quarterfinals (4-2 vs. MON); Lost in QMJHL semifinals (0–4 vs. HAL)
ROU	2005–06	70	43	22	-	5	91	3rd in Western	Lost in division quarterfinals (1–4 vs. SHA)
ROU	2006–07	70	36	27	-	7	79	6th in Telus	Won in division quarterfinals (4–1 vs. GAT); Won in division semifinals (4–3 vs. DRU); Lost in QMJHL semifinals (0–4 vs. LEW)
ROU	2007–08	70	47	20	-	3	97	1st in Telus	Won in division quarterfinals (4–0 vs. VDO); Won in division semifinals (4–0 vs. RIM); Won in QMJHL semifinals (4–0 vs. SJN); Lost in President's Cup (1–4 vs. GAT)
ROU	2008–09	68	30	30	-	8	68	3rd in Telus West	Lost in first round (2–4 vs. MTL)
ROU	2009–10	68	41	21	-	6	88	1st in Telus West	Won in first round (4–2 vs. VDO); Lost in QMJHL quarterfinals (1–4 vs. MON)
ROU	2010–11	68	12	50	-	6	30	6th in Telus West	Missed playoffs
ROU	2011–12	68	24	36	-	8	56	5th in Telus West	Lost in first round (0–4 vs. SHA)
ROU	2012–13	68	40	24	-	4	84	2nd in Telus West	Won in first round (4–1 vs. DRU); Won in QMJHL quarterfinals (4–1 vs. QUE); Lost in QMJHL semifinals (0–4 vs. HAL)
HAL	2016–17	68	27	35	-	6	60	5th in Maritimes	Lost in first round (2–4 vs. ROU)
ROU Total		739	357	302	20	60	794	3 Division Titles	0 President's Cups (45–53, 0.459)
HAL Total		68	27	35	-	6	60	0 Division Titles	0 President's Cups (2–4, 0.333)
QMJHL Total		807	384	337	20	66	854	3 Division Titles	0 President's Cups (47–57, 0.452)

=== OHL ===
Team	Year	Regular season							Postseason
Team	Year	G	W	L	T	OTL	Pts	Finish	Result
OTT	2017–18	68	30	29	-	9	69	4th in East	Lost in conference quarterfinals (1–4 vs. HAM)
OTT	2018–19	68	50	12	-	6	106	1st in East	Won in conference quarterfinals (4–0 vs. HAM); Won in conference semifinals (4–0 vs. SBY); Won in conference finals (4–0 vs. OSH); Lost in J. Ross Robertson Cup (2–4 vs. GUE)
OTT	2019–20	62	50	11	-	1	101	1st in East	Playoffs cancelled
OHL Total		198	130	52	-	16	276	2 Division Titles	0 J. Ross Robertson Cups (14–8, 0.636)

== Awards and honours ==
Award	Year
QMJHL
Ron Lapointe Trophy	2005–06
OHL
Matt Leyden Trophy	2018–19, 2019–20
CHL
Brian Kilrea Coach of the Year Award	2019–20

Sporting positions
Preceded by Rick Tocchet	Head coach of the Arizona Coyotes; 2021–2024	Succeeded by Position abolished
Preceded by Position created	Head coach of the Utah Mammoth; 2024–present	Incumbent
