= Halifax Mooseheads =

Junior ice hockey team in Halifax, Nova Scotia

- City: Halifax, Nova Scotia
- League: Quebec Maritimes Junior Hockey League
- Conference: Eastern
- Division: Maritimes
- Founded: 1994
- Home arena: Scotiabank Centre
- Colours: Green, white, red
- Owner: Sam Simon
- General manager: Cam Russell
- Head coach: Brad Mackenzie
- Website: www.halifaxmooseheads.ca

Championships
- Playoff championships: Memorial Cup Champions; 2013; QMJHL Champions; 2013

Current uniform

The Halifax Mooseheads are a Canadian junior ice hockey team in the Quebec Maritimes Junior Hockey League (QMJHL) based in Halifax, Nova Scotia. The team was founded in 1994 and began play in the Dilio Division of the QMJHL for the 1994–95 season. They have appeared in the President's Cup Finals five times, winning in 2013. The other four appearances were in 2003, 2005, 2019 and 2023. They hosted the Memorial Cup in 2000 and 2019 and won the tournament in 2013. The team plays their home games at the Scotiabank Centre.

The Mooseheads were the first team from Atlantic Canada to join the QMJHL. With the Mooseheads' success, the QMJHL then expanded to several other east coast cities. The QMJHL's eastward expansion has been credited with elevating the skill level and the career opportunities for hockey talent from the region. In the 2018–19 season, three of the NHL's top seven scorers were QMJHL alumni from Halifax; two of them former Mooseheads.

== History ==
=== Inception and first seasons: 1994–1997 ===
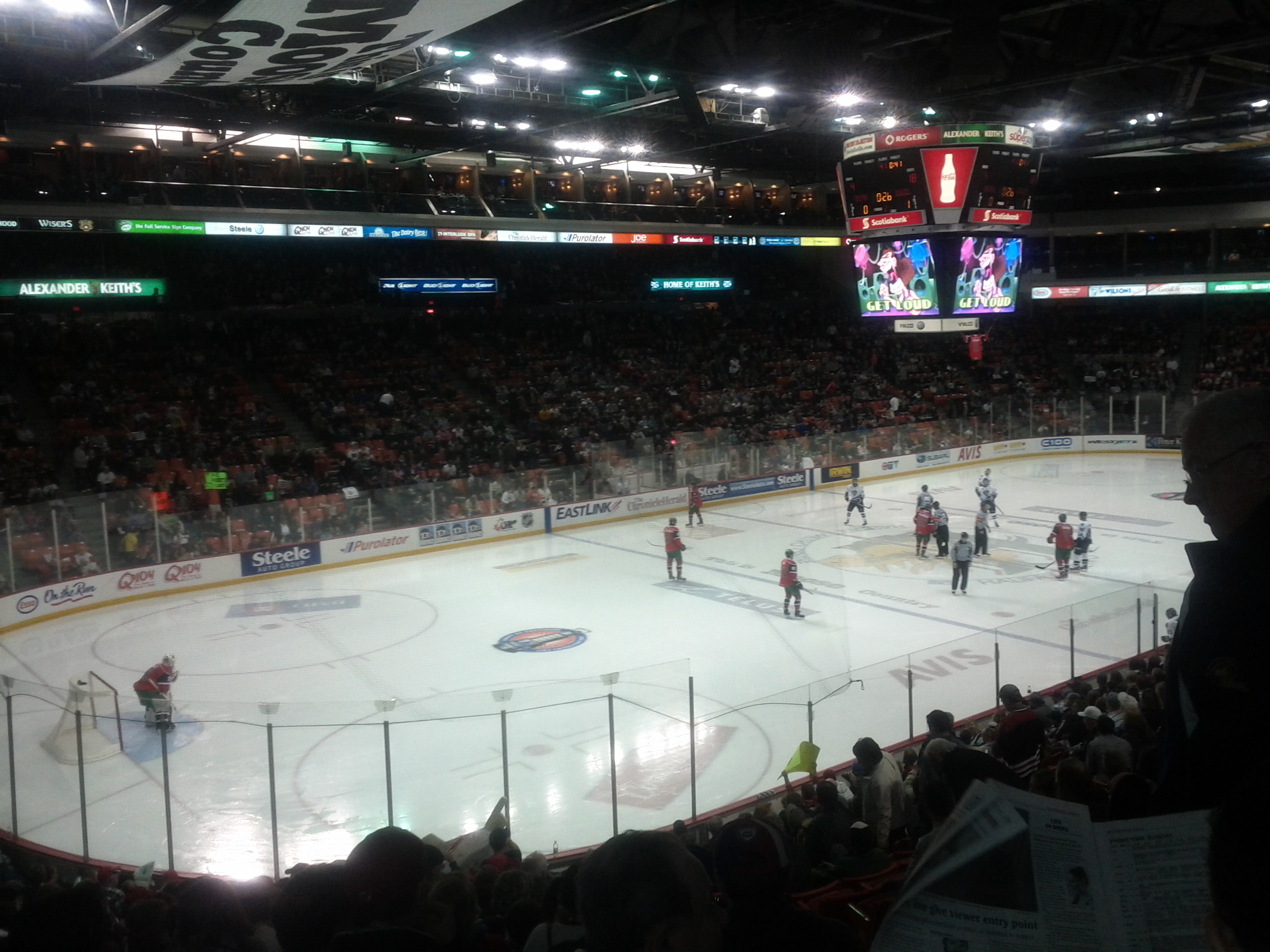
Halifax Mooseheads prepare to face off in a 2012 semi-final game.

Halifax was home to professional American Hockey League clubs for 22 seasons; however, in 1993 the Quebec Nordiques-affiliated Halifax Citadels announced plans to relocate the team. Faced with the loss of its major hockey draw, brewery executive Harold MacKay proposed the city seek a Quebec Major Junior Hockey League (QMJHL) franchise. Since its founding in 1969, the QMJHL consisted of almost exclusively Quebec-based teams. Expansion to Atlantic Canada was considered financially unfeasible by QMJHL commissioner Gilles Courteau and much of the league's executive committee due to the added travel costs for the existing franchises, but on 17 March 1994, the QMJHL Board of Governors unanimously approved the Halifax application.

MacKay won the financial backing of Moosehead Breweries president and CEO Derek Oland. The company put up the $500,000 expansion franchise fee and secured the team's naming rights. Nine minority owners included auto dealer John Gwynne-Timothy, fuel company executive Laddie Farquhar, and National Hockey League players Wendell Young and Cam Russell.

The new club then had to create a team in less than six months. MacKay recruited as the team's head coach and general manager Clément Jodoin, then an assistant coach with the Quebec Nordiques and a former AHL defenceman who had spent seven seasons in Halifax. He added as an assistant coach Shawn MacKenzie, a former professional goaltender and university coach.

With attendance averaging over 3700 per game, the Mooseheads finished their first season with a 24–42–6 record, earning a playoff berth despite finishing 11th overall in the 13-team league. The club lost in the first round, but took the first-place Beauport Harfangs to seven games. The Mooseheads continued to build over the next couple of seasons, finishing with a winning record and third place in their division in their third season. Fan support continued to grow, averaging 5349 during the regular season and reaching 9600 in the playoffs. The team reached the President's Cup semi-final for the first time in 1997, losing to the Chicoutimi Saguenéens in a seventh game. The club also continued to have success in recruitment, drafting winger Alex Tanguay, a future NHL all-star and Stanley Cup winner, 20th overall in the 1996 midget draft.

=== First Memorial Cup tournament: 1997–2003 ===
The Mooseheads underwent several changes prior to its fourth season in 1997–98. In addition to losing key players such as Shelley, the team's inaugural coach and general manager, Clément Jodoin, moved to an assistant coaching position with the Montreal Canadiens and the club's founder Harold MacKay stepped down as president. The organization recruited Denis Leblanc as general manager and Danny Grant, a former NHL 50-goal scorer and university coach, as the Mooseheads' new coach. The club struggled on the ice, finishing fifth in their division and losing in the first round of the playoffs in five games. Grant was then replaced as coach by Bob Mongrain.

Aided by key acquisitions, including goaltenders Pascal Leclaire and Aleksei Volkov, and Slovakian forward Ladislav Nagy, the team rebounded to second place divisional finishes in 1999 and 2000, losing in the second round both seasons. Despite limited on-ice success, the Mooseheads still drew many fans; in 1998–99 cumulative attendance topped one million through the regular season and playoffs. It was the key factor in the Canadian Hockey League's awarding the 2000 Memorial Cup tournament to Halifax.

Following the four-game sweep to the Rimouski Océanic in the second round of the 2000 QMJHL playoffs, and a month before the Memorial Cup tournament was to begin, the club released Mongrain, replacing him with assistant coach Shawn Mackenzie. Led by a 10-point performance by Ramzi Abid, the Mooseheads finished the Memorial Cup round-robin with a 2–1 record, but lost in the semi-final to the Ontario Hockey League's Barrie Colts.

Following the team's strong Memorial Cup showing, Mackenzie was awarded the head coaching job to start the 2000–01 season, while Marcel Patenaude took over as general manager. After a slow 2–12 start to the season, the team improved and finished the season in first place in the Atlantic Division, only to lose to Rimouski in five games in the first round of the playoffs. A third place-overall finish the next season propelled Halifax into the second round, ending with a six-game second round loss to the Cape Breton Screaming Eagles.

In 2002, Sidney Crosby, a skilled forward from the Halifax suburb of Cole Harbour, had attracted media attention from an early age and often played with older teammates. In early 2002, he was 14 and playing triple-A midget hockey when the Mooseheads approached the QMJHL for permission to sign Crosby for the 2002–03 season. The club asked the league to adopt a rule similar to one in the Ontario Hockey League allowing an underage player to play a season with his hometown club prior to draft eligibility. The QMJHL board of governors turned down the request.

The 2002–03 season became the club's most successful at the time, marking its first appearance in a President's Cup final. With a regular season record of 44–15–10–3, the club secured first place in its division, before sweeping Cape Breton in the first round, then beating Acadie Bathurst and Baie Comeau each in seven-game series. The team then met the Hull Olympiques in the final, taking them to seven games before dropping a 7–2 decision in the deciding game.

The 2002–03 season was also significant as the city of Halifax played host to the World Junior Hockey Championship and original majority owner Moosehead Breweries disclosed the company was looking for a buyer for its 64 percent share of the club. Before the start of the 2003–04 season, the club announced that Bobby Smith, a Nova Scotia native and former NHL forward and general manager, had become majority owner. The club retained the rights to the Mooseheads' name and logo.

=== New ownership: 2003–2011 ===
After having brought in several older players for a run at the league championship, the Mooseheads iced a less experienced team for the 2003–04 season. Among players the team lost was the team's then-offensive leader, Brandon Benedict, who retired with a record of 303 points in 343 games played for the Mooseheads. Outscored 194–274 on the season, the team did not qualify for of the playoffs for the first time in its history. In addition, team owner Bobby Smith engaged in a public spat with the management of the club's arena, claiming the Mooseheads' lease was the worst in junior hockey. After threatening to leave for an older, smaller rink, the dispute was resolved after municipal government intervened.

The Mooseheads team that began the 2004–05 season was much improved over the previous year, going into the Christmas break eight games over .500, although the team was often undisciplined and plagued by suspensions. Among them was an eight-game suspension of winger Frédérik Cabana for a knee-on-knee hit that sidelined Rimouski's Sidney Crosby for two weeks. In response, Smith fired coach Shawn MacKenzie, replacing him with a former NHL linemate, Al MacAdam. Under MacAdam, the team ended the season in first place in their division and moving on to the league final for the second time in three seasons. The season came to an end when the Oceanic and Crosby swept the Mooseheads in the final.

MacAdam returned as coach again in 2005–06, and the Mooseheads finished fifth in their division, while advancing to the second round of the playoffs. MacAdam then retired and was replaced by assistant coach Cam Russell, who was also a part owner of the club and 10-year NHL defenceman.

Russell's best season as coach saw the club advance to the 2007–08 semi-finals, before losing in four games to the Olympiques. The next two seasons had the club finish out of the playoffs and in last place in their division. 2009–10 was the worst season in the team's history, finishing with just 13 wins and a .191 record while Russell insisted it was setting the stage for a complete team rebuild. The club went into the 2010 and 2011 QMJHL midget drafts and CHL import drafts with a number of early round picks. A few games into the 2010–11 season, Russell stepped away from the bench to become the club's full-time general manager, with Bobby Smith taking over the head coach's role.

=== Rebuild and President's Cup championship: 2011–2017 ===
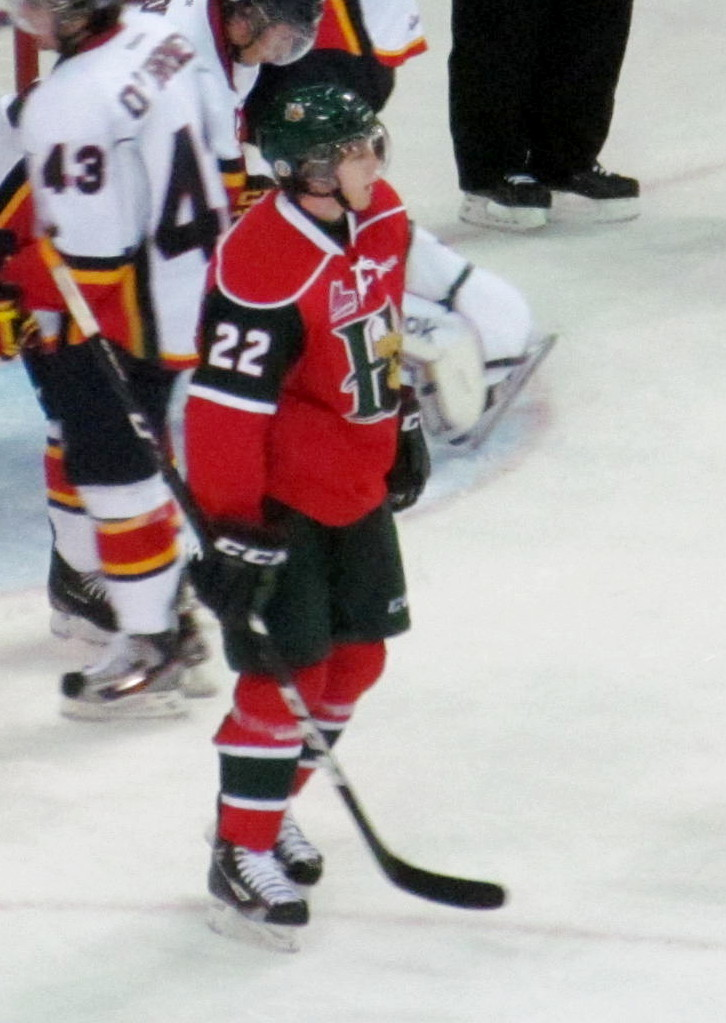
Nathan MacKinnon

In 2011, Nathan MacKinnon, a fast-skating forward from Dartmouth and had developed his skills in the Cole Harbour minor hockey system like Sidney Crosby, was attracting media attention. MacKinnon was also a life-long Mooseheads fan; his family were season tickets holders and had billeted several Mooseheads' players. After failing to land Crosby nine years earlier, the club was determined to add MacKinnon to the Mooseheads roster, however, Baie Comeau Drakkar held the first pick in the June 2011 QMJHL midget draft. The Drakkar chose to select him, despite MacKinnon's signalling he would choose to play in the United States rather than sign with Baie Comeau. Five weeks later, the Drakkar agreed to trade MacKinnon to Halifax in exchange for two top forwards and three consecutive first round draft picks.

The results of Russell's strategic rebuilding program were evident in the 2011–12 season, but coincided with a new coach. Dominique Ducharme was a former junior AAA head coach and QMJHL assistant coach. A trade with the Rouyn-Noranda Huskies netted them the second pick overall in the 2011 midget draft, allowing the Mooseheads to select highly ranked centre Jonathan Drouin. With the eleventh pick, the club chose Montreal goaltender Zachary Fucale. In the 2010 import draft, the club had acquired Czech power forward Martin Frk.

The 2012–13 Mooseheads season then became the most successful in the franchise's history. They finished the season atop all teams in the Canadian Hockey League with just six regulation losses and a .882 record, outscoring their opposition 347–176. Anchored by Drouin and MacKinnon, the team had seven players with a plus-40 rating or better, as well as a defence led by German import Konrad Abeltshauser. In the playoffs, the team improved its winning record to .941, sweeping three rounds before losing one game to Baie Comeau in the final en route to a home ice President's Cup win.

The Mooseheads then went on to compete in the 2013 Memorial Cup in Saskatoon, Saskatchewan. After finishing the round-robin with a 2–1 record, they faced and defeated the Portland Winterhawks in the tournament final by a score of 6–4. Nathan MacKinnon recorded two hat-tricks during the tournament, including one in the championship game. It marked the third straight Memorial Cup championship for the QMJHL.

In the 2013 NHL entry draft, four members of the Mooseheads were selected, including MacKinnon at #1, Drouin at #3 and Fucale as the top goalie, at #36 overall.

The 2013–14 was also successful. While MacKinnon had departed for the Colorado Avalanche, Drouin and Fucale both returned to the Mooseheads lineup, and the club added a couple of star forwards by way of the 2013 import draft, Nikolaj Ehlers and Timo Meier.

The club found itself in a rebuilding mode once again in the 2014–15 season. With the departure of more Memorial Cup veterans including Fucale and Drouin, Ehlers and Meier became the team leaders. After a fourth-place divisional finish, the team upset favoured Shawinigan Cataractes in the first playoff round, before falling to the Moncton Wildcats in seven games.

The following season saw the club fall back into losing territory, recording only 21 wins and finishing out of the playoffs in sixth place in the Maritimes division. The Ducharme era came to a close, with the coach moving to the Drummondville Voltigeurs before taking on the role of head coach of the Canada national junior team. In May, the club signed a five-year deal with former NHL assistant coach Andre Tourigny to take over as head coach. While the team showed improvement in 2016–17, finishing in fifth place, they were ousted by Rouyn-Noranda 2–4 in the opening round of the playoffs. Tourigny then departed for the OHL at the end of the season.

The Mooseheads made history at the 2016 QMJHL draft by being the first team to have the first and second overall picks when they selected highly touted prospects Benoit-Olivier Groulx and Truro's Jared McIsaac.

=== Recent years: 2017–present ===
As the 2017–18 season approached, Smith and Russell were already looking forward to the club's 25th anniversary season. At the centre of their plans was a bid for the 2019 Memorial Cup tournament and to make sure the Mooseheads were legitimate contenders for a second national junior title. The CHL announced in May 2018 that Halifax had won the right to host the event, beating out a rival proposal from Moncton. Among the commitments made by Halifax was a promise to keep ticket prices affordable after high prices in previous tournaments were blamed for empty seats. The club set the cost of tournament passes for season ticket holders at $320, less than half the price of passes at the 2018 tournament in Regina.

The Mooseheads began the season by moving offices, training, and practice facilities to the RBC Centre, a new $43 million four-pad arena in Dartmouth.

Assistant coach Jim Midgley took over the head coaching duties for the 2017–18 season, looking for improved results from the returning Olivier-Groulx and MacIsaac, along with goaltender Alexis Gravel and veteran Max Fortier. While import star Nico Hischier had departed after one season, selected first overall by the New Jersey Devils in the 2017 NHL entry draft, the club had signed another top Czech prospect, Filip Zadina.

The club began its 25th anniversary year in 2018 with another coaching change. Éric Veilleux was a former NHL forward and AHL head coach who had led the Shawinigan Cataractes to a Memorial Cup crown in 2012 and only had one losing season in nine years as a head coach in major junior.

The team then traded for veteran players, including Antoine Morand and Samuel Asselin from the reigning Memorial Cup champion Acadie-Bathurst Titan, and Bridgewater, Nova Scotia, native Keith Getson from the Charlottetown Islanders. The team finished the season with its second-best all-time record at 49 wins and a .750 points percentage, good for first place in the Maritimes Division. After a seven-game, come-from-behind win over Quebec in the first round, the Mooseheads swept the Moncton Wildcats in four straight, then beat Drummondville in six games in a semi-final matchup. The Mooseheads were led by the production of NHL draft prospect Raphaël Lavoie, who led the league in playoff scoring with 20 goals. In the final, the Mooseheads faced the league-leading Rouyn-Noranda Huskies, a team that had finished the regular season with 59 wins and had lost only two playoff games. The Huskies won the final in six games, hoisting the President's Cup on Halifax ice.

The two teams met again in the Memorial Cup tournament: the Huskies as QMJHL champions with the Mooseheads qualifying as hosts. The Mooseheads advanced with a bye to the championship game following a 2–1 record and first-place finish in the round-robin with their lone loss coming against the Huskies. The Huskies then also advanced to the final and defeated the Mooseheads again by a score of 4–2. Following the season, head coach Veilleux left the team for a position with the Syracuse Crunch of the American Hockey League.

On March 14, 2021, Kenzie Lalonde became the first woman to provide play-by-play coverage on television for any QMJHL game; the game was between the Mooseheads, who were hosting, and the Charlottetown Islanders.

== Coaches ==
- Clément Jodoin – 1994–1997
- Shawn MacKenzie – 1996–97*, 2000–2005
- Danny Grant – 1997–1998
- Bob Mongrain – 1998–2000
- Cam Russell – 2000–01 season*
- Chris Donnelly – 2003–04 season*
- Marcel Patenaude – 2004–05 season*
- Al MacAdam – 2004–2006
- Cam Russell – 2006–2010
- Bobby Smith – 2010–2011
- Dominique Ducharme – 2011–2016
- Andre Tourigny – 2016–2017
- Jim Midgley – 2017–2018
- Éric Veilleux – 2018–2019
- J. J. Daigneault – 2019–2021
- Sylvain Favreau – 2021–2023
- Jim Midgley – 2023–2024
- Andrew Lord – 2024–2025
- Brad Mackenzie – 2025–present

* = Interim head coach

== Players ==
=== Retired numbers ===
List of retired numbers from 1994 to present.

- 18 Alex Tanguay (1996–1999)
- 22 Nathan MacKinnon (2011–2013)
- 25 Jody Shelley (1994–1997)
- 47 Jean-Sébastien Giguère (1994–1997)

Honorary

- Pat Connolly (broadcaster)

=== NHL alumni ===
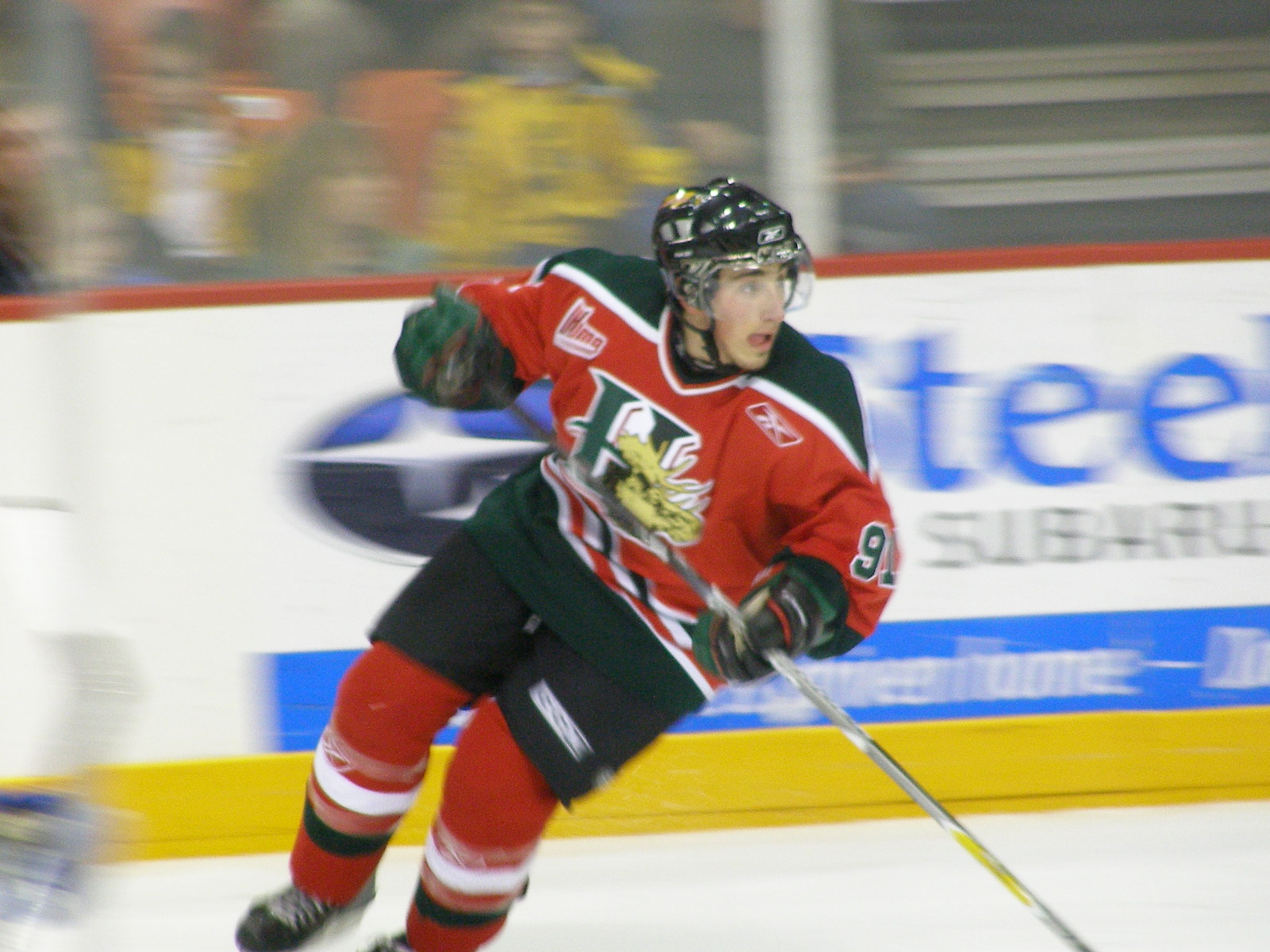
Brad Marchand

The following players have played in at least one National Hockey League (NHL) game as of the 2023-24 season:

- Ramzi Abid
- Justin Barron
- Andrew Bodnarchuk
- David Brine
- Frédéric Cassivi
- Marc Chouinard
- Elliot Desnoyers
- Joe DiPenta
- Jonathan Drouin
- Jeremy Duchesne
- Arnaud Durandeau
- Benoit Dusablon
- Nikolaj Ehlers
- Ryan Flinn
- Martin Frk
- Zachary Fucale
- Jean-Sébastien Giguère
- Alexandre Grenier
- Benoit-Olivier Groulx
- Nico Hischier
- Éric Houde
- Milan Jurcina
- Jason King
- Raphaël Lavoie
- Pascal Leclaire
- Joey MacDonald
- Nathan MacKinnon
- Brad Marchand
- Timo Meier
- Ladislav Nagy
- Xavier Parent
- Alexandre Picard
- Brandon Reid
- Jody Shelley
- Alex Tanguay
- Jakub Voracek
- Petr Vrana
- MacKenzie Weegar
- Filip Zadina

=== NHL first round draft picks ===
List of first round selections in the NHL entry draft:

| Year | # | Player | Nationality | NHL team |
|---|---|---|---|---|
| 1995 | 13 | Jean-Sébastien Giguère (G) | Canada | Hartford Whalers |
| 1998 | 12 | Alex Tanguay (C) | Canada | Colorado Avalanche |
| 2001 | 8 | Pascal Leclaire (G) | Canada | Columbus Blue Jackets |
| 2007 | 7 | Jakub Voracek (RW) | Czech Republic | Columbus Blue Jackets |
| 2007 | 19 | Logan MacMillan (C) | Canada | Anaheim Ducks |
| 2013 | 1 | Nathan MacKinnon (C) | Canada | Colorado Avalanche |
| 2013 | 3 | Jonathan Drouin (LW) | Canada | Tampa Bay Lightning |
| 2014 | 9 | Nikolaj Ehlers (LW) | Denmark | Winnipeg Jets |
| 2015 | 9 | Timo Meier (RW) | Switzerland | San Jose Sharks |
| 2017 | 1 | Nico Hischier (C) | Switzerland | New Jersey Devils |
| 2018 | 6 | Filip Zadina (RW) | Czech Republic | Detroit Red Wings |
| 2020 | 25 | Justin Barron (D) | Canada | Colorado Avalanche |
| 2021 | 27 | Zachary L'Heureux (LW) | Canada | Nashville Predators |

=== All-25 Team ===
The club marked its first quarter century in 2018–19, by naming the Mooseheads' all-time, all-star team. Members were chosen by fan ballot from a shortlist of 100 names.

| Head coach | | Nationality | Seasons | Career notes |
|---|---|---|---|---|
| Dominique Ducharme | | Canada | 2011–2016 | Won 2013 President's Cup and Memorial Cup |
| Position | Player | Nationality | Seasons | Career notes |
| D | Konrad Abeltshauser | Germany | 2009–2013 | Drafted by San Jose Sharks in 2010 |
| D | Andrew Bodnarchuk | Canada | 2005–2008 | Drafted by Boston Bruins in 2006 |
| LW | Jonathan Drouin | Canada | 2011–2014 | Drafted by Tampa Bay Lightning in 2013 |
| LW | Nikolaj Ehlers | Denmark | 2013–2015 | Drafted by Winnipeg Jets in 2014 |
| RW | Maxime Fortier | Canada | 2014–2018 | |
| G | Zachary Fucale | Canada | 2011–2014 | Drafted by Montreal Canadiens in 2013 |
| G | Jean-Sébastien Giguère | Canada | 1994–1997 | Drafted by Hartford Whalers in 1995 |
| C | Nico Hischier | Switzerland | 2016–2017 | Drafted first overall by New Jersey Devils in 2017 |
| D | Trey Lewis | Canada | 2010–2013 | |
| D | Ali MacEachern | Canada | 1997–2001 | |
| C | Nathan MacKinnon | Canada | 2011–2013 | Drafted first overall by the Colorado Avalanche in 2013 |
| D | Jared McIsaac | Canada | 2016–2020 | Drafted by Detroit Red Wings in 2018 |
| C | Ladislav Nagy | Slovakia | 1998–1999 | Drafted by St. Louis Blues in 1997 |
| C | Alex Tanguay | Canada | 1996–1999 | Drafted by Colorado Avalanche in 1998 |
| RW | Jakub Voráček | Czech Republic | 2006–2008 | Drafted by Columbus Blue Jackets in 2007 |
| D | MacKenzie Weegar | Canada | 2012–2014 | Drafted by Florida Panthers in 2013 |

== Season-by-season results ==
=== Regular season ===
QMJHL season standings.
OTL = Overtime loss, SL = Shootout loss

| Season | GP | Won | Lost | Tied | OTL | SOL | Points | Pts % | GF | GA | Standing |
|---|---|---|---|---|---|---|---|---|---|---|---|
| 1994–95 | 72 | 24 | 42 | 6 | — | — | 54 | 0.375 | 257 | 317 | 6th in Dilio Division |
| 1995–96 | 70 | 32 | 36 | 2 | — | — | 66 | 0.471 | 258 | 262 | 4th in Dilio Division |
| 1996–97 | 70 | 37 | 29 | 4 | — | — | 78 | 0.557 | 267 | 255 | 3rd in Dilio Division |
| 1997–98 | 70 | 24 | 41 | 5 | — | — | 53 | 0.379 | 263 | 316 | 5th in Dilio Division |
| 1998–99 | 70 | 46 | 20 | 4 | — | — | 96 | 0.686 | 298 | 206 | 2nd in Dilio Division |
| 1999–2000 | 72 | 41 | 20 | 6 | 5 | — | 93 | 0.611 | 316 | 259 | 2nd in Maritimes Division |
| 2000–01 | 72 | 32 | 24 | 10 | 6 | — | 80 | 0.514 | 235 | 253 | 1st in Maritimes Division |
| 2001–02 | 72 | 39 | 21 | 9 | 3 | — | 90 | 0.604 | 267 | 197 | 2nd in Maritimes Division |
| 2002–03 | 72 | 44 | 15 | 10 | 3 | — | 101 | 0.681 | 289 | 206 | 1st in Maritimes Division |
| 2003–04 | 70 | 17 | 43 | 7 | 3 | — | 44 | 0.293 | 194 | 274 | 4th in Atlantic Division |
| 2004–05 | 70 | 42 | 16 | 10 | 2 | — | 96 | 0.671 | 242 | 172 | 1st in Atlantic Division |
| 2005–06 | 70 | 35 | 33 | — | 1 | 1 | 72 | 0.507 | 246 | 258 | 5th in East Division |
| 2006–07 | 70 | 32 | 31 | — | 3 | 4 | 71 | 0.457 | 269 | 287 | 6th in East Division |
| 2007–08 | 70 | 42 | 23 | — | 6 | 2 | 89 | 0.600 | 278 | 241 | 1st in East Division |
| 2008–09 | 68 | 19 | 41 | — | 3 | 5 | 46 | 0.279 | 193 | 290 | 6th in Atlantic Division |
| 2009–10 | 68 | 13 | 48 | — | 3 | 4 | 33 | 0.191 | 171 | 288 | 6th in Atlantic Division |
| 2010–11 | 68 | 20 | 43 | — | 2 | 3 | 45 | 0.331 | 186 | 262 | 5th in Maritimes Division |
| 2011–12 | 68 | 39 | 22 | — | 2 | 5 | 85 | 0.625 | 250 | 238 | 2nd in Maritimes Division |
| 2012–13 | 68 | 58 | 6 | — | 3 | 1 | 120 | 0.882 | 347 | 176 | 1st in Telus Maritimes Division |
| 2013–14 | 68 | 47 | 18 | — | — | 3 | 97 | 0.713 | 292 | 182 | 1st in Telus Maritimes Division |
| 2014–15 | 68 | 32 | 30 | — | 4 | 2 | 70 | 0.515 | 227 | 242 | 4th in Maritimes Division |
| 2015–16 | 68 | 21 | 39 | — | 7 | 1 | 50 | 0.345 | 193 | 277 | 6th in Maritimes Division |
| 2016–17 | 68 | 27 | 35 | — | 3 | 3 | 60 | 0.441 | 229 | 259 | 5th in Maritimes Division |
| 2017–18 | 68 | 43 | 18 | — | 6 | 1 | 93 | 0.684 | 270 | 223 | 2nd in Maritimes Division |
| 2018–19 | 68 | 49 | 15 | — | 2 | 2 | 102 | 0.750 | 300 | 164 | 1st in Maritimes Division |
| 2019–20 | 63 | 20 | 38 | — | 3 | 2 | 45 | 0.357 | 170 | 263 | 5th in Maritimes Division |
| 2020–21 | 43 | 15 | 19 | — | 5 | 4 | 39 | 0.453 | 152 | 183 | 4th in Maritimes Division |
| 2021–22 | 68 | 38 | 28 | — | 1 | 1 | 78 | 0.574 | 272 | 272 | 4th in Maritimes Division |
| 2022–23 | 68 | 50 | 11 | — | 4 | 3 | 107 | 0.787 | 335 | 196 | 1st in Maritimes Division |
| 2023–24 | 68 | 42 | 18 | — | 7 | 1 | 92 | 0.676 | 227 | 184 | 1st in Maritimes Division |
| 2024–25 | 64 | 19 | 35 | — | 8 | 2 | 48 | 0.375 | 155 | 231 | 5th in Maritimes Division |
| 2025–26 | 64 | 29 | 29 | — | 3 | 3 | 64 | 0.500 | 214 | 258 | 7th in Eastern Conference |

=== Playoffs ===
| Season | 1st round | 2nd round | 3rd round | Finals |
|---|---|---|---|---|
| 1994–95 | L, 3–4, Beauport | – | – | – |
| 1995–96 | 1–5 in round-robin | – | – | – |
| 1996–97 | W, 3–1, Beauport | W, 4–3, Shawinigan | L, 3–4, Chicoutimi | – |
| 1997–98 | L, 1–4, Rimouski | – | – | – |
| 1998–99 | Bye | L, 1–4, Acadie–Bathurst | – | – |
| 1999–2000 | W, 4–2, Baie-Comeau | L, 0–4, Rimouski | – | – |
| 2000–01 | L, 2–4, Rimouski | – | – | – |
| 2001–02 | W, 4–3, Rimouski | L, 2–4, Cape Breton | – | – |
| 2002–03 | W, 4–0, Cape Breton | W, 4–3, Acadie–Bathurst | W, 4–3, Baie-Comeau | L, 3–4, Hull |
| 2003–04 | Did not qualify | | | |
| 2004–05 | Bye | W, 4–1, Gatineau | W, 4–0, Rouyn-Noranda | L, 0–4, Rimouski |
| 2005–06 | W, 4–2, Lewiston | L, 1–4, Moncton | – | – |
| 2006–07 | W, 4–3, Moncton | L, 1–4, Lewiston | – | – |
| 2007–08 | W, 4–2, Victoriaville | W, 4–1, Cape Breton | L, 0–4, Gatineau | – |
| 2008–09 | Did not qualify | | | |
| 2009–10 | Did not qualify | | | |
| 2010–11 | L, 0–4, Montreal | – | – | – |
| 2011–12 | W, 4–0, Moncton | W, 4–3, Quebec | L, 2–4, Rimouski | – |
| 2012–13 | W, 4–0, Saint John | W, 4–0, Gatineau | W, 4–0, Rouyn-Noranda | W, 4–1, Baie-Comeau |
| 2013–14 | W, 4–0, Charlottetown | W, 4–1, Gatineau | L, 3–4, Val-d'Or | – |
| 2014–15 | W, 4–3, Shawinigan | L, 3–4, Moncton | – | – |
| 2015–16 | Did not qualify | | | |
| 2016–17 | L, 2–4, Rouyn-Noranda | – | – | – |
| 2017–18 | W, 4–1, Baie-Comeau | L, 0–4, Charlottetown | – | – |
| 2018–19 | W, 4–3, Quebec | W, 4–0, Moncton | W, 4–2, Drummondville | L, 2–4, Rouyn-Noranda |
| 2019–20 | QMJHL playoffs cancelled due to ongoing COVID-19 pandemic | | | |
| 2020–21 | Did not qualify^{1} | | | |
| 2021–22 | L, 2–3, Acadie–Bathurst | – | – | – |
| 2022–23 | W, 4–0, Cape Breton | W, 4–1, Moncton | W, 4–2, Sherbrooke | L, 2–4, Quebec |
| 2023–24 | L, 0–4, Acadie–Bathurst | – | – | – |
| 2024–25 | W, 4–3, Drummondville | L, 0–4, Rouyn-Noranda | – | – |
| 2025–26 | L, 0–4, Chicoutimi | – | – | – |

^{1} Due to local travel restrictions, all Nova Scotia-based teams were deemed ineligible to compete in the playoffs. Three New Brunswick-based teams competed in a six-game round-robin tournament to determine who would face the Charlottetown Islanders in the Maritimes Division final.

=== Memorial Cup ===
The Memorial Cup is contested annually by the champions of the Ontario Hockey League (OHL), Quebec Maritimes Junior Hockey League (QMJHL), and Western Hockey League (WHL), as well as a predetermined host team. The competition consists of a round-robin, a semifinal game, and a final game. Below are the results of every game the Halifax Mooseheads have competed in.

| Year | Round-robin | Semifinal | Final |
|---|---|---|---|
| 2000 (Note: Host team) | W, 5–2 Barrie Colts; W, 7–1 Kootenay Ice; L, 3–5 Rimouski Océanic | L, 3–6 Barrie Colts | |
| 2013 | W, 7–4 Portland Winterhawks; L, 2–5 Saskatoon Blades; W, 9–2 London Knights | Bye | W, 6–4 Portland Winterhawks |
| 2019 | W, 4–1 Prince Albert Raiders; W, 4–2 Guelph Storm; L, 3–4 Rouyn-Noranda Huskies | Bye | L, 2–4 Rouyn-Noranda Huskies |

== Team records ==
Team records for a single season
| Statistic | Total | Season |
|---|---|---|
| Most points | 120 | 2012–13 |
| Most wins | 58 | 2012–13 |
| Fewest points | 33 | 2009–10 |
| Fewest wins | 13 | 2009–10 |
| Most goals for | 347 | 2012–13 |
| Fewest goals for | 171 | 2009-10 |
| Fewest goals against | 164 | 2018–19 |
| Most goals against | 317 | 1994–95 |
| Highest average attendance | 8686 | 2012–13 |
| Lowest average attendance | 3768 | 1994–95 |

Individual player records for a single season
| Statistic | Player | Total | Season |
|---|---|---|---|
| Most goals | Ladislav Nagy | 71 | 1998–99 |
| Most assists | Jordan Dumais | 86 | 2022–23 |
| Most points | Jordan Dumais | 140 | 2022–23 |
| Most points, rookie | Ladislav Nagy | 126 | 1998–99 |
| Most points, defenceman | Jasmin Gelinas | 87 | 1999-2000 |
| Most goals, defenceman | Mario Dumoulin | 23 | 1998–99 |
| Most penalty minutes | Carlyle Lewis | 425 | 1998–99 |
| Best GAA, (Note: Goals against average, minimum 1,500 minutes played) goaltender | Zachary Fucale | 2.26 | 2013–14 |
| Most shutouts, goaltender | Zachary Fucale | 6 | 2013–14 |
| Plus/Minus | Nikolaj Ehlers | +65 | 2013–14 |
