= Coldharbour, Cornwall =

Coordinates: 50.2961°N 5.1605°W

Coldharbour
- Location within Cornwall
- OS grid reference: SW750488
- Civil parish: Perranzabuloe
- Unitary authority: Cornwall
- Ceremonial county: Cornwall
- Region: South West
- Country: England
- Sovereign state: United Kingdom
- Post town: Truro
- Postcode district: TR
- Police: Devon and Cornwall
- Fire: Cornwall
- Ambulance: South Western

Coldharbour is a hamlet in the parish of Perranzabuloe, Cornwall, England.
