= Cole Harbour, Nova Scotia =

Cole Harbour
- Community
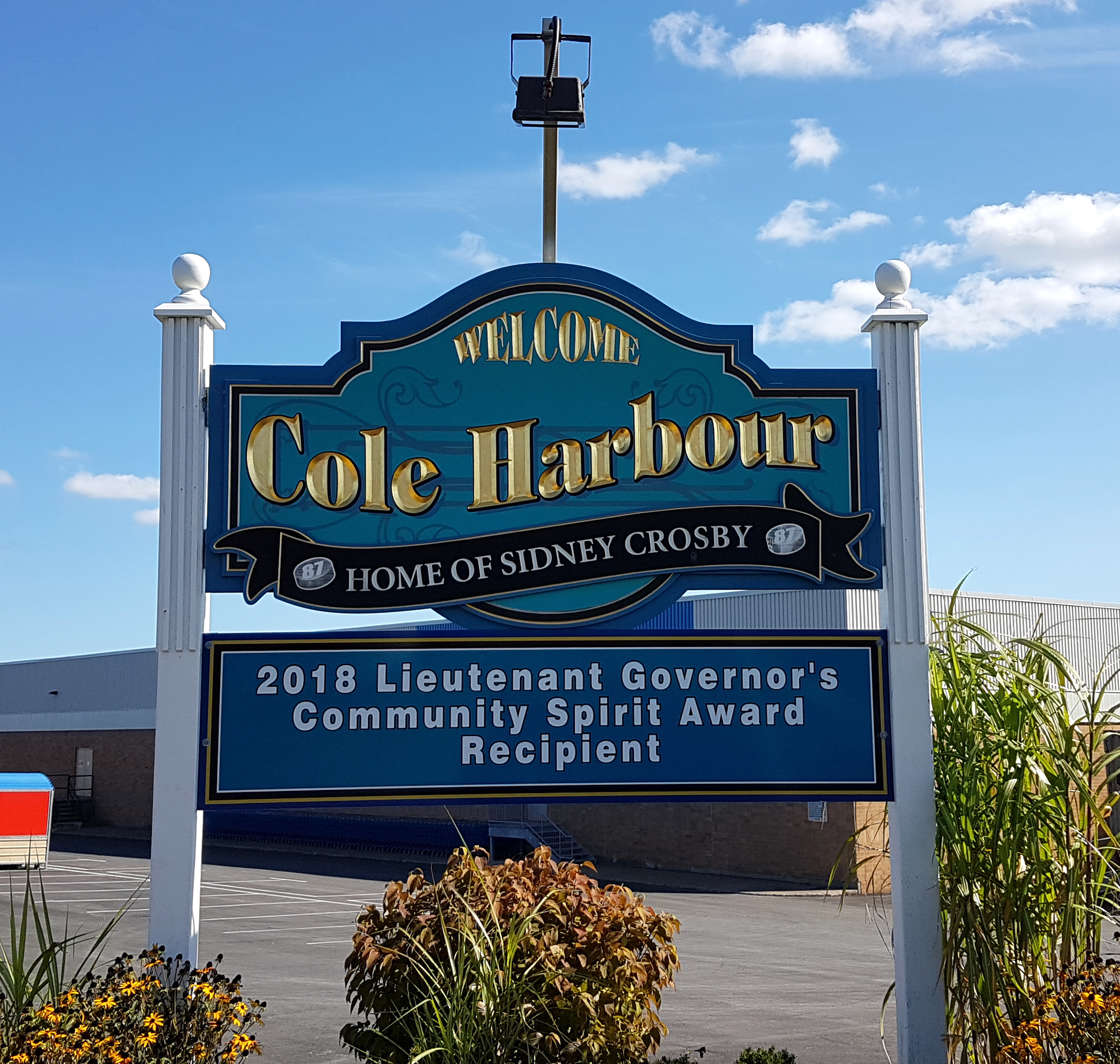
- Cole Harbour city sign

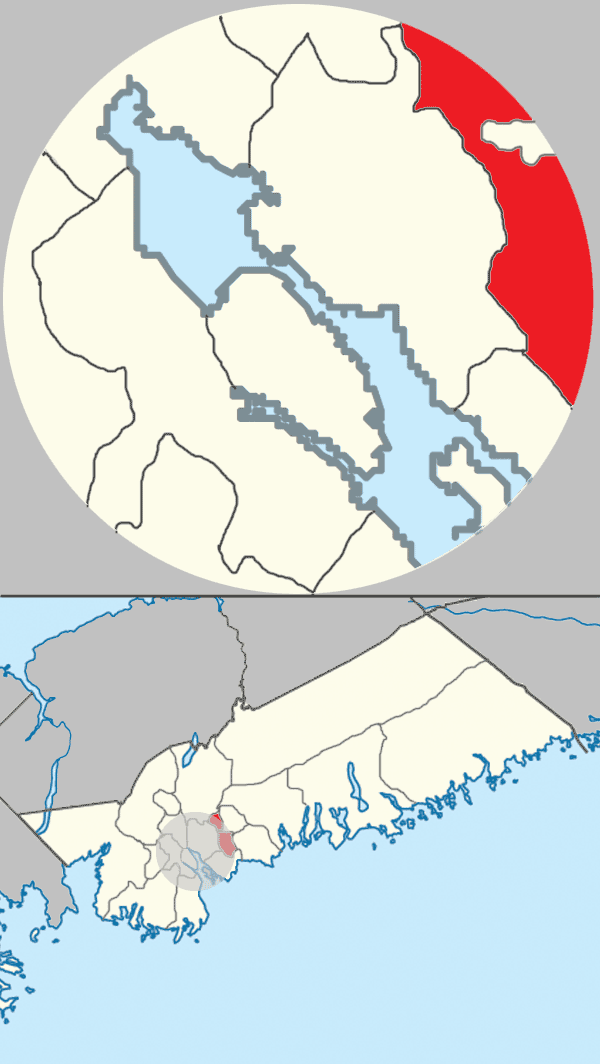
- Halifax Harbour(top), and Halifax Regional Municipality.

- Location of Cole Harbour, Nova Scotia
- Coordinates: 44°40′18″N 63°29′23″W
- Country: Canada
- Province: Nova Scotia
- Municipality: Halifax Regional Municipality
- Community council: Harbour East - Marine Drive Community Council
- District: 4 - Cole Harbour - Westphal
- Founded: 1754

Area
  - Total: 10.00 km^{2} (3.86 sq mi)
- Time zone: UTC-4 (AST)
  - Summer (DST): UTC-3 (ADT)
- Canadian Postal code: B2V, B2W, B2Z
- Area codes: 782, 902
- GNBC code: CAHMN

Cole Harbour is a former village and current community located in Nova Scotia, Canada, that is part of the Halifax Regional Municipality.

== Geography ==
It is situated 6 kilometres (4 miles) east of the central business district of Dartmouth and takes its name from Cole Harbour, a natural harbour fronting the Atlantic Ocean.

Cole Harbour is adjacent to and immediately east of the former city boundary of Dartmouth; prior to municipal amalgamation and the creation of the Halifax Regional Municipality in 1995, Cole Harbour was an unincorporated village within the Municipality of the County of Halifax. Because of amalgamation in the Halifax region, Canada Post recognizes most of Cole Harbour's residents as living in neighbouring Dartmouth.

== Transportation ==
The centre of Cole Harbour is at the intersection of Forest Hills Parkway and Route 207 (Cole Harbour Road). A small business district is situated along Route 207 with several residential subdivisions such as Forest Hills and Colby Village located north and south of this road.

The Forest Hills Parkway links the community to Highway 107, while Cole Harbour Road becomes Portland Street further to the west in Dartmouth and links to Highway 111.

Extensive residential and commercial development took place during the 1970s and 1980s following completion of Highway 111 and the widening of Cole Harbour Road.

Until the mid-1980s, CN Rail operated a rail line from Dartmouth to Upper Musquodoboit with part of the route crossing the southern edge of the community. The abandoned rail corridor was converted to a rail trail named the Salt Marsh Trail and is part of the Trans Canada Trail.

== Schools ==
- Cole Harbour District High School
- Astral Drive Junior High School
- Sir Robert Borden Junior High School
- Astral Drive Elementary School
- Bel Ayr Elementary School
- Caldwell Road Elementary School
- Colby Village Elementary School
- Colonel John Stewart Elementary School
- George Bissett Elementary School
- Humber Park Elementary School
- Joseph Giles Elementary School
- Robert Kemp Turner Elementary School

=== Community and recreation facilities ===
Cole Harbour Place is the main recreation center in Cole Harbour offering swimming and aquatics, skating, fitness classes, and a gym. Housed within Cole Harbour Place is a branch of the Halifax Public Libraries- offering for loan books, movies, and reference materials. Many special interest classes are held within the library space.

=== Sea Cadets ===
Cole Harbour is home to Royal Canadian Sea Cadet Corps IROQUOIS, recipient of the Convoy Shield for the most proficient Sea Cadet Corps in the Maritime area.

== Notable people ==
- Malcolm Cameron, professional ice hockey coach for the ECHL and WHL.
- Marc Cheverie, retired professional ice hockey goalie for the AHL and EIHL
- Mike Clattenburg, film director, writer and creator of Trailer Park Boys
- Sidney Crosby, professional hockey player, 3x Stanley Cup Champion and 2x Gold & 1x Silver Olympic medallist, captain of the Pittsburgh Penguins and Canada men's national ice hockey team
- Kevin Deveaux, lawyer and former senior global adviser on parliaments for the United Nations
- Joe DiPenta, professional hockey player, 2007 Stanley Cup Champion
- T. J. Grant, UFC fighter
- Ian Hanlin, voice actor
- Craig Hillier, professional hockey player
- Andrew Hogan, first Roman Catholic priest to be elected to the House of Commons of Canada
- Nathan MacKinnon, professional hockey player, 2022 Stanley Cup Champion & 1x Silver Olympic medallist
- Tony Ince, Senator in the Senate of Canada
- Matt Mays, musician and film producer
- John Paul Tremblay, actor
- Robb Wells, actor
- Jason John Whitehead, comedian
- Jeff Williams, former international rugby player
- Morgan Williams, international rugby player
- Cameron Russell, former NHL defenceman and current general manager of the Halifax Mooseheads, played with the Cole Harbour Red Wings
- Rob Dow, head coach of the Penn State soccer team. He had previously led the University of Vermont program to the 2024 NCAA championship.
