= Coalport (disambiguation) =

Coalport or Coal Port, can refer to:

- Coalport, a village in Shropshire, England.
- Coalport Branch Line, a railway branch line in Shropshire, England.
- Coalport Canal, alternate name for a portion of the Shropshire Canal in England.
- Coalport China Museum, a museum.
- Coalport porcelain, a type of porcelain.
- Coalport, Pennsylvania, a borough in Pennsylvania, US.
- Coalport, Ohio, former name for the village of Middleport, Ohio, US.
- Coalport West railway station, a railway station in Coalport, England.
- Coalport/North Clinton, Trenton, New Jersey, a neighborhood in Trenton, New Jersey, US.

== See also ==
- Coal (disambiguation)
- Port (disambiguation)
- Coaling station, where a ship refuels its coal bunker
- Coal Harbor (disambiguation)
