= Cam Russell =

Canadian ice hockey player

- Born: January 12, 1969 (age 57) Halifax, Nova Scotia, Canada
- Height: 6 ft 4 in (193 cm)
- Weight: 200 lb (91 kg; 14 st 4 lb)
- Position: Defence
- Shot: Left
- Played for: Chicago Blackhawks; Colorado Avalanche
- NHL draft: 50th overall, 1987; Chicago Blackhawks
- Playing career: 1989–1999

Cameron D. Russell (born January 12, 1969) is a Canadian former National Hockey League defenceman.

== Biography ==
As a youth, Russell played in the 1982 Quebec International Pee-Wee Hockey Tournament with the Cole Harbour Red Wings a minor ice hockey team from Dartmouth, Nova Scotia.

Chosen in the third round of the 1987 NHL entry draft (50th overall) by the Chicago Blackhawks, Russell played ten seasons, almost all of which came within the Chicago Blackhawks organization. He finished his career in 1998–99 with the Colorado Avalanche.

The following season, Russell became an assistant coach with the Halifax Mooseheads in the Quebec Major Junior Hockey League, serving from 1999 to 2002. He returned to the Mooseheads in 2008 as the team's head coach and general manager, moving solely to the general manager role early in the 2010–11 season.

Russell was the GM and architect of the Mooseheads 2013 Memorial Cup win.

== Career statistics ==
=== Regular season and playoffs ===
			Regular season					Playoffs
Season	Team	League	GP	G	A	Pts	PIM	GP	G	A	Pts	PIM
1985–86	Hull Olympiques	QMJHL	56	3	4	7	24	15	0	2	2	4
1986–87	Hull Olympiques	QMJHL	66	3	16	19	119	8	0	1	1	16
1987–88	Hull Olympiques	QMJHL	53	9	18	27	141	19	2	5	7	39
1988–89	Hull Olympiques	QMJHL	66	8	32	40	109	9	2	6	8	6
1989–90	Indianapolis Ice	IHL	46	3	15	18	114	9	0	1	1	24
1989–90	Chicago Blackhawks	NHL	19	0	1	1	27	1	0	0	0	0
1990–91	Indianapolis Ice	IHL	53	5	9	14	125	6	0	2	2	30
1990–91	Chicago Blackhawks	NHL	3	0	0	0	5	1	0	0	0	0
1991–92	Indianapolis Ice	IHL	41	4	9	13	78	—	—	—	—	—
1991–92	Chicago Blackhawks	NHL	19	0	0	0	34	12	0	2	2	2
1992–93	Chicago Blackhawks	NHL	67	2	4	6	151	4	0	0	0	0
1993–94	Chicago Blackhawks	NHL	67	1	7	8	200	—	—	—	—	—
1994–95	Chicago Blackhawks	NHL	33	1	3	4	88	16	0	3	3	8
1995–96	Chicago Blackhawks	NHL	61	2	2	4	129	6	0	0	0	2
1996–97	Chicago Blackhawks	NHL	44	1	1	2	65	4	0	0	0	4
1997–98	Chicago Blackhawks	NHL	41	1	1	2	79	—	—	—	—	—
1998–99	Chicago Blackhawks	NHL	7	0	0	0	10	—	—	—	—	—
1998–99	Colorado Avalanche	NHL	35	1	2	3	84	—	—	—	—	—
NHL totals			396	9	21	30	872	44	0	5	5	16
