= Cole Harbour (natural harbour) =

Natural harbour in Nova Scotia, Canada

Coordinates: 44.663°N 63.437°W

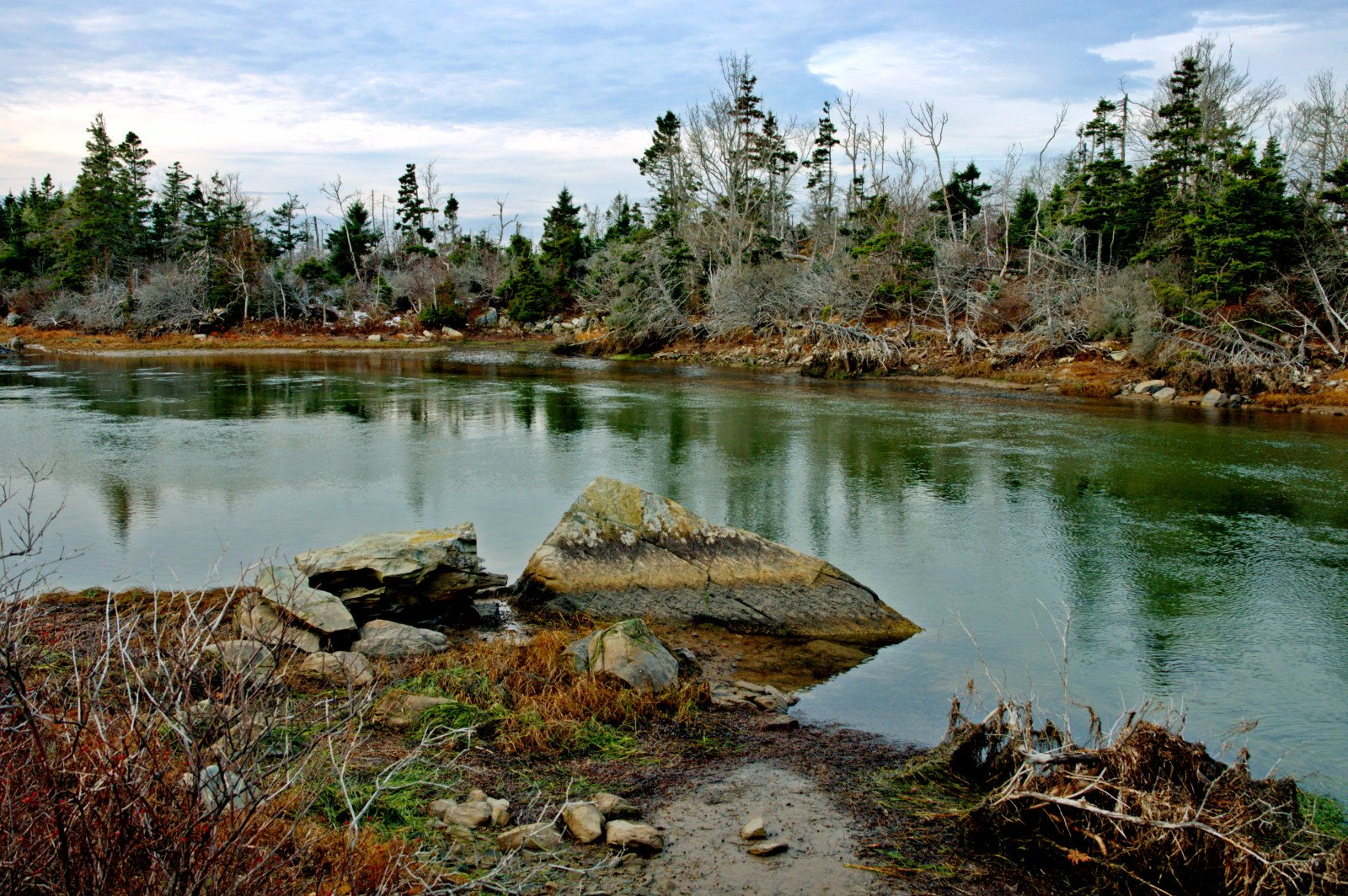
Salt marsh of Cole Harbour

Cole Harbour is the name for a natural harbour located in the Canadian province of Nova Scotia.

It is located in central Halifax County, with the mouth of the harbour located 6 kilometres northeast of Halifax Harbour.

The entrance to Cole Harbour is protected by Rainbow Haven Beach, a barrier beach which forms a lagoon on the inland side.

Measuring approximately 4 kilometres east to west and 3 kilometres north to south, the harbour is shallow and rocky. Virtually the entire shoreline and the harbour itself are protected by the provincial government as the Cole Harbour - Lawrencetown Coastal Heritage Provincial Park.

The centre of the harbour is divided by a man-made feature; during the late 19th century a railway was constructed from Dartmouth to Musquodoboit Harbour and crossed the width of Cole Harbour on a 3 kilometre causeway. Rail service was abandoned by CN Rail during the 1980s and the corridor has been converted to a rail trail as part of the Trans Canada Trail.

Part of the western shore of Cole Harbour was dyked during the 19th century to provide land for farmers. These structures were destroyed in the early 20th century and are now occupied by several residential homes along the Cow Bay road.

This park features 7 main trails (7.9 km total) which highlight the area’s heritage and natural flora and fauna, as well as woodlands, fields and salt marsh shoreline. The trailhead and parking lot are located at 256 Bissett Road in Cole Harbour. The trails running from this main trailhead interconnect; each trail has its own character. The trails are open year-round (no winter maintenance) for all to explore the area’s wildlife, including bird watching, while hiking, cycling, skiing, and snowshoeing along the trails. The rails to trails corridor, Trans Canada Trail passes through Cole Harbour Heritage Park. The Cole Harbour Parks and Trails Association maintain the trails at the Cole Harbour Heritage Park and a portion of the Trans Canada Trail.

== Communities ==
Communities along the shores of Cole Harbour from west to east include:

- Cow Bay
- Cole Harbour
- Upper Lawrencetown
- West Lawrencetown
- Naugle
