= Shawn MacKenzie =

Canadian ice hockey player (born 1962)

- Born: August 22, 1962 (age 64) Bedford, Nova Scotia, Canada
- Height: 5 ft 10 in (178 cm)
- Weight: 175 lb (79 kg; 12 st 7 lb)
- Position: Goaltender
- Caught: Left
- Played for: New Jersey Devils
- NHL draft: 169th overall, 1980; Colorado Rockies
- Playing career: 1982–1987

Shawn Kenneth MacKenzie (born August 22, 1962) is a Canadian former professional ice hockey goaltender who played a total of 130 minutes during 6 games in the National Hockey League with the New Jersey Devils. He had 15 goals scored against him in those 130 minutes of play, for a goals against average of 6.92.

From 2000 to 2004, he served as head coach of the QMJHL's Halifax Mooseheads. During the 2005–2006 season, he was head coach of the CEHL's Dartmouth Destroyers.

MacKenzie was born in Bedford, Nova Scotia. Since 2006, he has coached minor hockey in the Bedford Minor Hockey Association.

== Career statistics ==
=== Regular season and playoffs ===
			Regular season									Playoffs
Season	Team	League	GP	W	L	T	MIN	GA	SO	GAA	SV%	GP	W	L	MIN	GA	SO	GAA	SV%
1979–80	Windsor Spitfires	OMJHL	41	17	14	1	1964	158	0	4.83	.847	13	6	6	680	45	0	3.97	—
1980–81	Windsor Spitfires	OHL	60	30	27	2	3540	282	1	4.78	—	11	3	4	622	47	0	4.53	—
1981–82	Windsor Spitfires	OHL	17	6	11	0	1001	77	0	4.62	—	—	—	—	—	—	—	—	—
1981–82	Oshawa Generals	OHL	32	20	12	0	1934	124	1	3.85	—	12	7	5	707	53	0	4.50	—
1982–83	New Jersey Devils	NHL	6	0	1	0	130	15	0	6.92	.779	—	—	—	—	—	—	—	—
1982–83	Wichita Wind	CHL	36	10	23	2	2083	148	1	4.26	.878	—	—	—	—	—	—	—	—
1983–84	Maine Mariners	AHL	34	14	13	5	1946	113	0	3.48	.879	1	0	0	—	0	0	0.00	1.00
1984–85	Maine Mariners	AHL	24	8	8	3	1254	70	3	3.35	.873	2	0	1	69	9	0	7.83	—
1985–86	Hershey Bears	AHL	10	5	3	0	521	36	0	4.15	.875	—	—	—	—	—	—	—	—
1985–86	Kalamazoo Wings	IHL	6	4	2	0	262	27	0	4.40	—	—	—	—	—	—	—	—	—
1986–87	Maine Mariners	AHL	6	3	2	0	321	19	1	3.55	.865	—	—	—	—	—	—	—	—
NHL totals			6	0	1	0	131	15	0	6.92	.779	—	—	—	—	—	—	—	—
