= 2011–12 Missouri Mavericks season =

2011–12 Missouri Mavericks
- Conference: 3rd Turner
- 2011–12 record: 39–21–6
- Home record: 19–11–3
- Road record: 20–10–3
- Goals for: 223
- Goals against: 200

Team information
- General manager: Brent Thiessen
- Coach: Scott Hillman
- Arena: Independence Events Center
- Average attendance: 5,531

Team leaders
- Goals: Andrew Courtney (29)
- Assists: Sebastien Thinel (59)
- Points: Sebastien Thinel (82)
- Penalty minutes: Dave Pszenyczny (117)
- Plus/minus: Dave Simoes (+17)
- Wins: Charlie Effinger (32)
- Goals against average: Charlie Effinger (2.70)

The 2011–12 Missouri Mavericks season was the third season of the Central Hockey League (CHL) franchise in Independence, Missouri. On September 17, 2011, the Mavericks announced an affiliation agreement with the Chicago Wolves of the American Hockey League. On March 23, 2012, the Mavericks clinched a playoff berth with a 5–3 victory against the Bloomington Blaze. The Mavericks' season ended on April 26, 2012, when they were eliminated in Game 7 of the Turner Cup Conference Finals by the Fort Wayne Komets.

== Regular season ==
=== Conference standings ===
Updated May 12, 2012.

Turner Conference	GP	W	L	OTL	GF	GA	Pts
Fort Wayne Komets	66	40	19	7	228	187	87
Evansville IceMen	66	40	22	4	215	192	84
Missouri Mavericks	66	39	21	6	223	200	84
Rapid City Rush	66	38	22	6	226	176	82
Quad City Mallards	66	37	27	2	230	201	76
Dayton Gems	66	23	29	14	185	228	60
Bloomington Blaze	66	24	35	7	183	244	55

== Playoffs ==
2012 Central Hockey League Ray Miron President's Cup Playoffs

Turner Conference Semifinals vs. #2 Evansville IceMen (Best-of-Seven Series) (Home: 2-0; Road: 2-0)
#	Date	Opponent	Score	OT	Decision	Series
1	March 28	Evansville IceMen	3-2		Effinger	1-0
2	March 30	@ Evansville IceMen	7-1		Effinger	2-0
3	March 31	@ Evansville IceMen	3-2	OT	Effinger	3-0
4	April 2	Evansville IceMen	3-1		Effinger	4-0

Turner Conference Semifinals vs. #1 Fort Wayne Komets (Best-of-Seven Series) (Home: 1-2; Road: 2-2)
#	Date	Opponent	Score	OT	Decision	Series
1	April 13	@ Fort Wayne Komets	3-2	OT	Effinger	1-0
2	April 14	@ Fort Wayne Komets	6-3		Effinger	2-0
3	April 18	Fort Wayne Komets	3-1		Boucher	2-1
4	April 19	Fort Wayne Komets	5-4	2OT	Boucher	2-2
5	April 21	Fort Wayne Komets	5-2		Effinger	3-2
6	April 24	@ Fort Wayne Komets	4-1		Boucher	3-3
7	April 26	@ Fort Wayne Komets	6-4		Boucher	3-4

== Awards, records, and milestones ==
=== Awards and records ===
Player	Award/Record
Missouri Mavericks (Team)	Franchise-highs in wins (39), points (84), and winning percentage (.636).; Highest Power Play percentage in team history and the only team with a Power Play percentage higher than 20% in the Central Hockey League for the 2011–12 Season (21%).; One of only three teams in the Central Hockey League (along with the Wichita Thunder and Fort Wayne Komets) to win at least 20 games on the road (20-10-3 road record).; Central Hockey League's Best Website award (2011–12 Season); Central Hockey League's Best Use of Social Media award (2011–12 Season); Highest number of sellouts in franchise history (19).; First playoff sweep in franchise history (4 games versus the Evansville IceMen in the Turner Conference Opening Round).; Franchise records in the most postseason games played (11), the latest date on which the team played a postseason game (April 26), and the longest playoff series (7 games).; Played in first Game 7 in franchise history (Turner Conference Final Game 7 versus the Fort Wayne Komets).
Brandon Coccimiglio	CHL Player of The Month (January 2012). He scored 8 goals and 10 assists that month.
Andrew Courtney	Set franchise records for goals, assists, and points by a rookie in a season (59 points on 29 goals and 30 assists); Tied the franchise record for goals in a season (29 goals); CHL All-Star Team (2011–12 Season); CHL All-Rookie Team (2011–12 Season); Finalist for Central Hockey League Rookie of The Year
Charlie Effinger	CHL Goaltender of The Month (October 2011, March 2012); CHL Goaltender of The Week (5 times, a record)
Kris Hogg	CHL Rookie of The Month (October 2011)
Ed McGrane	Franchise record for consecutive games with a point (13), scoring 21 points on 3 goals and 18 assists during the streak. The previous record was 11 games, set by Jeff Christian during the 2009-10 season.; CHL's Most Gentlemanly Player (2011–12 season)
Dave Pszenyczny	Broke team record for goals scored by a Defenseman (14). The previous record was 10 goals, which was set by Mike Burgoyne during the 2009-10 season and Ray DiLauro during the 2010-11 season.
Dave Simoes	CHL's Best Pound-for-Pound Fighter (2011–12 Season)
Brent Thiessen (President & General Manager)	2012 Willis of Texas/N. Thomas Berry Commitment Cup (given to a person who has shown great dedication and passion for not only the CHL, but the sport of Hockey)
Sebastien Thinel	First player in team history to score at least 80 points in a season (82 points on 23 goals and 59 assists); Broke Jeff Christian's franchise record of points scored in a season (78 points during the team's inaugural 2009-10 season).

=== Milestones ===
Player	Milestone
Missouri Mavericks (Team)	The 500,000th fan attends a Missouri Mavericks game

== Transactions ==
The Mavericks have been involved in the following transactions during the 2011–12 season.

Player Signings/Re-Signings/Acquisitions off Waivers/Reactivated from Team Suspension

Player	Former team	Date
Simon Watson	Re-signed	May 31, 2011
Nathan O'Nabigon	Re-signed	June 27, 2011
Carlyle Lewis	Re-signed	June 27, 2011
Derek Knowles	Re-signed	June 27, 2011
Cole Ruwe	Re-signed	June 27, 2011
Brandon Coccimiglio	Re-signed	July 7, 2011
Vern Cooper	Re-signed	July 7, 2011
Andrew Courtney	Re-signed	July 21, 2011
Jakub Macek	SAPA AV19 Székesfehérvár	July 21, 2011
David Pszenyczny	Bossier-Shreveport Mudbugs	July 21, 2011
Mike Wakita	Re-signed	July 21, 2011
Brad Good	Florida Everblades	August 4, 2011
Joshua Hepditch	University of New Brunswick	August 4, 2011
Ed McGrane	Karlskrona HK	August 5, 2011
Charlie Effinger	Newcastle Vipers	August 17, 2011
Zach Carriveau	Nepean Raiders	August 17, 2011
Derek Pallardy	Re-signed	August 18, 2011
John-Scott Dickson	Gwinnett Gladiators	August 18, 2011
Matt Dias	Hockey Milano Rossoblu	August 18, 2011
Lachlan MacIntosh	University of New Brunswick	August 18, 2011
Sebastien Thinel	Odessa Jackalopes	August 23, 2011
Kris Hogg	Lakehead University	August 23, 2011
Jared Lavender	Re-signed	September 2, 2011
Andy Zulyniak	Lakehead University	September 2, 2011
Toms Hartmanis	Newcastle Vipers	September 9, 2011
Dale Mahovsky	Newcastle Vipers	September 9, 2011
Steven Later	Re-signed	September 16, 2011
Gerry Festa	Re-signed	September 16, 2011
Mike Berry	Re-signed	September 16, 2011
Janis Brakss	Montpellier Vipers	September 16, 2011
Derek Smith	Helena Bighorns	November 25, 2011
Justin Grant	Quad City Mallards	November 25, 2011
Brandon Smith	Fayetteville FireAntz	December 14, 2011
Mike Gurtler	Bakersfield Condors	December 15, 2011
Tyler Ruel	Turnhout White Caps	December 18, 2011
Jason Weeks	Tulsa Oilers	December 10, 2011
Dave Simoes	Louisiana IceGators	December 27, 2011
Wes Russell	Robert Morris University	January 14, 2012
Vern Cooper	Reactivated from Team Suspension	January 13, 2012
Mike DeBolt	Unknown (San Antonio Diablos	January 17, 2012
Andrew Favot	Reading Royals	January 19, 2012
Jakub Macek	Re-signed	January 19, 2012
Lukáš Bohunický	HC Slovan Bratislava	February 8, 2012
Randy McNaught	Connecticut Whale (Previously assigned to Mavericks by Whale on a 5-game contract)	February 25, 2012
B.J. O'Brien	Greenville Road Warriors	March 7, 2012
Matt McCready	University of Windsor	March 16, 2012
Kevin Noble	Mercyhurst University	March 28, 2012
Brad Walch	Saginaw Spirit	April 18, 2012

Player waivings/losses to free agency/retirements/placement on team suspension

Player	Waived (new team)/Free agent (new team)/retired/placed on team suspension (new team)	Date
Toby Lafrance	Free agent (Dauphins d'Épinal)	May 16, 2011
Sean Muncy	Free agent (ESV Buchloe)	August 4, 2011
Clayton Barthel	Free agent/retired	August 4, 2011
Brennan Barker	Free agent (Cornwall River Kings)	August 4, 2011
Simon Watson	Retired, named Mavericks' Assistant Director of Hockey Operations	August 5, 2011
Ray DiLauro	Free agent (Nippon Paper Cranes)	August 15, 2011
Ryan Sparling	Free agent (Laredo Bucks)	September 3, 2011
Ryan Jardine	Free agent (Lørenskog IK)	September 3, 2011
Shawn Fensel	Free agent (Las Vegas Wranglers)	September 7, 2011
Todd Griffith	Free agent (Laredo Bucks)	September 8, 2011
Rob Nolan	Free agent (Chicago Express)	September 20, 2011
David Pszenyczny	Waived in Order to Sign with Affiliate Team (Chicago Wolves (Missouri Mavericks' AHL affiliate), signed two-way contract with Wolves, so could be optioned back to Mavericks.)	September 22, 2011
Charlie Effinger	Chicago Wolves Waived in Order to Sign with Affiliate Team(Missouri Mavericks' AHL affiliate), signed two-way contract with Wolves, so could be optioned back to Mavericks.	September 22, 2011
Mike Berry	Waived (Rødovre Mighty Bulls)	October 3, 2011
Janis Brakss	Waived (Danville Dashers)	October 14, 2011
Matt Dias	Waived	October 14, 2011
Toms Hartmanis	Waived (Fife Flyers)	October 18, 2011
Derek Pallardy	Waived (Columbus Cottonmouths)	October 18, 2011
Steven Later	Waived (Horse Lake Chiefs)	October 18, 2011
Jakub Macek	Waived	October 19, 2011
Derek Smith	Waived	November 25, 2011
Justin Grant	Waived (Quad City Mallards)	November 27, 2011
Jason Weeks	Waived	December 15, 2011
Tyler Ruel	Waived (Mississippi Surge)	January 6, 2012
Vern Cooper	Placed on Team Suspension	January 6, 2012
Levente Szuper	Placed on Team Suspension (Arystan Temirtau)	January 14, 2012
Vern Cooper	Waived (Nipissing University	January 13, 2012
Wes Russell	Waived	January 16, 2012
Mike DeBolt	Waived	January 19, 2012
Andrew Favot	Waived/Retired	March 1, 2012
Brad Good	Declared Unrestricted Free agent	March 26, 2012

Trades

June 8, 2011	To Allen Americans: Chris Mifflen	To Missouri: David Nimmo
June 8, 2011	To Arizona Sundogs: Bobby Jarosz, Karl Sellan	To Missouri: Clayton Barthel, Sean Muncy
June 8, 2011	To Tulsa Oilers: Braden Walls	To Missouri: Brennan Barker
August 16, 2011	To Arizona Sundogs: David Nimmo	To Missouri: Future Considerations
August 23, 2011	To Arizona Sundogs: Nick Sirota	To Missouri: Future Considerations
October 17, 2011	To Quad City Mallards: Jared Lavender	To Missouri: Future Considerations
October 17, 2011	To Rapid City Rush: Derek Knowles	To Missouri: Future Considerations
October 18, 2011	To Allen Americans: Joshua Hepditch	To Missouri: Future Considerations
November 29, 2011	To Allen Americans: Lachlan MacIntosh	To Missouri: Brian Mahoney-Wilson, Steve Kaunisto
December 6, 2011	To Dayton Gems: Andy Zulyniak	To Missouri: Financial Considerations
December 27, 2011	To Bloomington Blaze: Brian Mahoney-Wilson	To Missouri: Future Considerations
December 27, 2011	To Arizona Sundogs: Zach Carriveau	To Missouri: Future Considerations
December 31, 2011	To Arizona Sundogs: Steve Kaunisto, Nathan O'Nabigon	To Missouri: Levente Szuper
January 1, 2012	To Arizona Sundogs: Mike Gurtler	To Missouri: Patrick Schafer
January 1, 2012	To Fort Wayne Komets: Gerry Festa	To Missouri: Tristin Llewellyn

Player Transfers to/from affiliate team or on loan from non-affiliate team

Player	To/from	Affiliate team	Date
David Pszenyczny	from	Chicago Wolves	September 22, 2011
Dustin Friesen	from	Chicago Wolves	September 22, 2011
Charlie Effinger	from	Chicago Wolves	September 22, 2011
Ryan Jardine	from	Chicago Wolves	October 3, 2011
Dustin Friesen	to	Chicago Wolves	Unknown (Only known he was with the Wolves as of October 9, 2011)
J. P. Testwuide	from	Chicago Wolves	November 7, 2011
J. P. Testwuide	to	Chicago Wolves	November 14, 2011
J. P. Testwuide	from	Chicago Wolves	December 3, 2011
Dustin Friesen	from	Chicago Wolves	December 3, 2011
J. P. Testwuide	to	Chicago Wolves	December 6, 2011
Dustin Friesen	to	Chicago Wolves	December 6, 2011
Charlie Effinger	to	Chicago Wolves	December 12, 2011
Charlie Effinger	from	Chicago Wolves	December 23, 2011
Randy McNaught	from	Connecticut Whale	February 17, 2012
B.J. O'Brien	to	Chicago Wolves	March 17, 2012
B.J. O'Brien	from	Chicago Wolves	March 18, 2012
Tyler Fletcher	from	Knoxville Ice Bears	December 13, 2011
Tyler Fletcher	to	Knoxville Ice Bears	December 20, 2011

== Roster (all active-roster players during the season) ==
#	Nat	Name	Pos	S/G	Height	Weight	Birthdate	Birthplace	Regular-season GP	Playoff GP
29	(Slovakia)	Lukáš Bohunický	D	L	6 ft 4 in (1.93 m)	220 lb (100 kg)	30 October 1987	Bratislava, Slovakia	12	0
29	(United States)	Zach Carriveau	D	R	5 ft 11 in (1.80 m)	172 lb (78 kg)	6 August 1990	Hollis, Maine	25	0
17	(Canada)	Brandon Coccimiglio	F	L	6 ft 2 in (1.88 m)	209 lb (95 kg)	19 July 1987	Burlington, Ontario	48	9
9	(Canada)	Vern Cooper	C, RW	L	5 ft 8 in (1.73 m)	198 lb (90 kg)	30 December 1990	Waswanipi, Quebec	11	0
27	(Canada)	Andrew Courtney	F	R	6 ft 3 in (1.91 m)	201 lb (91 kg)	8 June 1985	Belleville, Ontario	63	11
35	(United States)	Mike Debolt	G		5 ft 9 in (1.75 m)	154 lb (70 kg)	31 July 1987	Scott AFB, Illinois	0	0
40	(Canada)	John-Scott Dickson	LW	R	6 ft 3 in (1.91 m)	214 lb (97 kg)	10 April 1984	North York, Ontario	66	11
31	(United States)	Charlie Effinger	G	L	6 ft 1 in (1.85 m)	165 lb (75 kg)	23 November 1985	Belleville, Illinois	51	11
71	(Canada)	Andrew Favot	LW	L	5 ft 7 in (1.70 m)	150 lb (68 kg)	26 April 1988	King City, Ontario	18	0
34	(Canada)	Gerry Festa	G	R	5 ft 10 in (1.78 m)	174 lb (79 kg)	18 January 1984	Calgary, Alberta	8	0
12	(Canada)	Tyler Fletcher	D, F	R	6 ft 2 in (1.88 m)	194 lb (88 kg)	2 April 1985	Calgary, Alberta	3	0
14	(Canada)	Dustin Friesen	D	L	6 ft 0 in (1.83 m)	170 lb (77 kg)	1 March 1983	Waldheim, Saskatchewan	1	0
3	(Canada)	Brad Good	D	R	6 ft 2 in (1.88 m)	201 lb (91 kg)	10 March 1986	Kitchener, Ontario	60	0
35	(United States)	Justin Grant	G	L	6 ft 0 in (1.83 m)	195 lb (88 kg)	23 April 1981	Burlington, Iowa	0	0
26	(United States)	Mike Gurtler	LW	L	6 ft 2 in (1.88 m)	196 lb (89 kg)	2 April 1987	(New York (state)) Rochester, New York	9	0
41	(Canada)	Kris Hogg	LW	L	5 ft 11 in (1.80 m)	179 lb (81 kg)	17 June 1986	Sicamous, British Columbia	50	11
21	(Canada)	Ryan Jardine	LW	L	6 ft 0 in (1.83 m)	194 lb (88 kg)	15 March 1980	Ottawa, Ontario	31	11
7	(United States)	Steve Kaunisto	D	L	6 ft 0 in (1.83 m)	192 lb (87 kg)	12 October 1986	Sault Ste. Marie, Michigan	13	0
24	(Canada)	Carlyle Lewis	RW, EN	R	6 ft 3 in (1.91 m)	234 lb (106 kg)	1 March 1978	Middleton, Nova Scotia	37	0
14	(United States)	Tristin Llewellyn	D	L	6 ft 1 in (1.85 m)	179 lb (81 kg)	2 May 1989	Ann Arbor, Michigan	33	11
7	(Canada)	Lachlan MacIntosh	RW	L	5 ft 11 in (1.80 m)	183 lb (83 kg)	9 December 1985	Perth-Andover, New Brunswick	11	0
35	(Slovakia)	Jakub Macek	G	L	6 ft 0 in (1.83 m)	172 lb (78 kg)	25 June 1987	Bratislava, Slovakia	2	0
35	(United States)	Brian Mahoney-Wilson	G	L	5 ft 10 in (1.78 m)	190 lb (86 kg)	7 April 1986	West Roxbury, Massachusetts	5	0
19	(Canada)	Dale Mahovsky	RW	R	6 ft 0 in (1.83 m)	187 lb (85 kg)	12 January 1985	Fort Saskatchewan, Alberta	66	11
7	(Canada)	Matt McCready	D	R	5 ft 11 in (1.80 m)	181 lb (82 kg)	1 July 1987	Kingsville, Ontario	7	11
11	(Canada)	Ed McGrane	C	L	5 ft 11 in (1.80 m)	187 lb (85 kg)	4 May 1978	Hamilton, Ontario	63	11
12	(Canada)	Randy McNaught	F	R	6 ft 4 in (1.93 m)	223 lb (101 kg)	5 September 1990	Nanaimo, British Columbia	15	3
15	(Canada)	Kevin Noble	D	L	6 ft 1 in (1.85 m)	201 lb (91 kg)	14 July 1987	Sparwood, British Columbia	0	9
30	(United States)	B.J. O'Brien	G	L	5 ft 11 in (1.80 m)	176 lb (80 kg)	20 August 1985	Lakeville, Minnesota	2	1
44	(Canada)	Nathan O’Nabigon	LW	L	6 ft 2 in (1.88 m)	194 lb (88 kg)	9 May 1983	Longlac, Ontario	18	0
5	(United States)	Dave Pszenyczny	D	L	6 ft 0 in (1.83 m)	192 lb (87 kg)	18 February 1985	Sterling Heights, Michigan	66	11
71	(Canada)	Tyler Ruel	C	R	6 ft 0 in (1.83 m)	174 lb (79 kg)	16 February 1986	Port Alberni, British Columbia	8	0
35	(United States)	Wes Russell	G	L	6 ft 1 in (1.85 m)	185 lb (84 kg)	7 January 1985	Springfield, Illinois	0	0
2	(United States)	Cole Ruwe	D	L	6 ft 1 in (1.85 m)	190 lb (86 kg)	2 April 1985	Pekin, Illinois	49	7
9	(United States)	Patrick Schafer	F	R	5 ft 10 in (1.78 m)	187 lb (85 kg)	12 December 1987	Hilliard, Ohio	36	10
26	(Canada)	Dave Simoes	D	L	5 ft 10 in (1.78 m)	205 lb (93 kg)	9 March 1985	Vanderhoof, British Columbia	41	11
4	(United States)	Brandon Smith	D, F	R	6 ft 0 in (1.83 m)	205 lb (93 kg)	3 September 1986	Pepper Pike, Ohio	45	11
35	(United States)	Derek Smith	G	L	5 ft 5 in (1.65 m)	150 lb (68 kg)	16 February 1983	Excelsior Springs, Missouri	0	0
35	(Hungary)	Levente Szuper	G	L	5 ft 10 in (1.78 m)	176 lb (80 kg)	11 June 1980	Budapest, Hungary	1	0
15	(United States)	J.P. Testwuide	D, F	L	6 ft 0 in (1.83 m)	200 lb (91 kg)	5 November 1984	Vail, Colorado	4	0
43	(Canada)	Sebastien Thinel	RW	L	6 ft 1 in (1.85 m)	181 lb (82 kg)	24 March 1981	St-Jérôme, Quebec	65	11
8	(Canada)	Mike Wakita	D	L	6 ft 2 in (1.88 m)	214 lb (97 kg)	28 May 1985	Kitimat, British Columbia	65	11
71	(United States)	Brad Walch	D	L	6 ft 1 in (1.85 m)	201 lb (91 kg)	24 January 1991	Saginaw, Michigan	0	2
	(United States)	Jason Weeks	C	R	5 ft 10 in (1.78 m)	198 lb (90 kg)	26 March 1985	(Washington (state)) Seattle, Washington	0	0
4	(Canada)	Andy Zulyniak	D	L	6 ft 1 in (1.85 m)	203 lb (92 kg)	25 February 1985	Winnipeg, Manitoba	15	0

== See also ==
- 2011–12 CHL season
