= 2011–12 Fort Wayne Komets season =

2011–12 Fort Wayne Komets
- League: 2nd CHL
- Conference: 1st Turner
- 2011–12 record: 40-19-7
- Home record: 19-8-6
- Road record: 21-11-1
- Goals for: 228
- Goals against: 187

Team information
- General manager: David Franke
- Coach: Al Sims
- Captain: Colin Chaulk
- Arena: Allen County War Memorial Coliseum
- Average attendance: 7,770

Team leaders
- Goals: Chris Auger (28)
- Assists: Bobby Chaumont (42)
- Points: Bobby Chaumont (66)
- Penalty minutes: Brent Henley (201)
- Plus/minus: Brent Henley (+29)
- Wins: Nick Boucher (32)
- Goals against average: Nick Boucher (2.44)

The 2011–12 Fort Wayne Komets season was the second season in the Central Hockey League (CHL) and the 60th season overall in professional hockey of the CHL franchise in Fort Wayne, Indiana.

== Regular season ==
=== Conference standings ===
Updated May 12, 2012.

Turner Conference	GP	W	L	OTL	GF	GA	Pts
Fort Wayne Komets	66	40	19	7	228	187	87
Evansville IceMen	66	40	22	4	215	192	84
Missouri Mavericks	66	39	21	6	223	200	84
Rapid City Rush	66	38	22	6	226	176	82
Quad City Mallards	66	37	27	2	230	201	76
Dayton Gems	66	23	29	14	185	228	60
Bloomington Blaze	66	24	35	7	183	244	55

== Roster ==
No.	Nat	Player	Pos	S/G	Age	Acquired	Birthplace	Contract
61	(Canada)	Chris Auger	F	L	38	2010	Belleville, Ontario	Komets
35	(Canada)	Kevin Beech	G	L	39	2011	London, Ontario	Komets
21	(Canada)	Jesse Bennefield	LW	R	44	2011	Calgary, Alberta	Komets
33	(Canada)	Nick Boucher	G	L	45	2007	Leduc, Alberta	Komets
91	(Canada)	Colin Chaulk (C)	C	L	49	2007	Toronto, Ontario	Komets
15	(Canada)	Bobby Chaumont	RW	R	41	2011	Sudbury, Ontario	Komets
14	(Canada)	Frankie DeAngelis	D	L	41	2009	Woodbridge, Ontario	Komets
34	(Canada)	Gerry Festa	G	R	42	2012	Calgary, Alberta	Komets
43	(Canada)	Brent Henley	D	L	45	2011	Coquitlam, BC	Komets
7	(Canada)	Jamie Lovell	D	L	43	2011	Elora, Ontario	Komets
10	(United States)	Tom Mele	F	L	40	2011	Bronx, New York	Komets
60	(United States)	Jamie Milam	D	R	41	2011	Lake Orion, Michigan	Komets
23	(United States)	Bryant Molle	D	L	38	2011	Anchorage, Alaska	Komets
4	(United States)	Dustin Molle	D	L	40	2010	Anchorage, Alaska	Komets
55	(Russia)	Artem Podshendyalov	LW	L	36	2010	Omsk, Russia	Komets
64	(Canada)	Jean-Michel Rizk	RW	R	40	2011	Dunham, Ontario	Komets
79	(United States)	Kaleigh Schrock (A)	RW	R	41	2009	Fort Wayne, Indiana	Komets
41	(Canada)	Brett Smith (A)	C	L	44	2011	Guelph, Ontario	Komets
9	(Canada)	David Starenky	D	L	40	2011	Calgary, Alberta	Komets
44	(Canada)	Leo Thomas	C	R	44	2008	Toronto, Ontario	Komets
29	(Canada)	Stephon Thorne	LW	L	35	2011	Mississauga, Ontario	Komets

== See also ==
- 2011–12 CHL season
