= Jarrod Skalde =

Canadian ice hockey player and coach

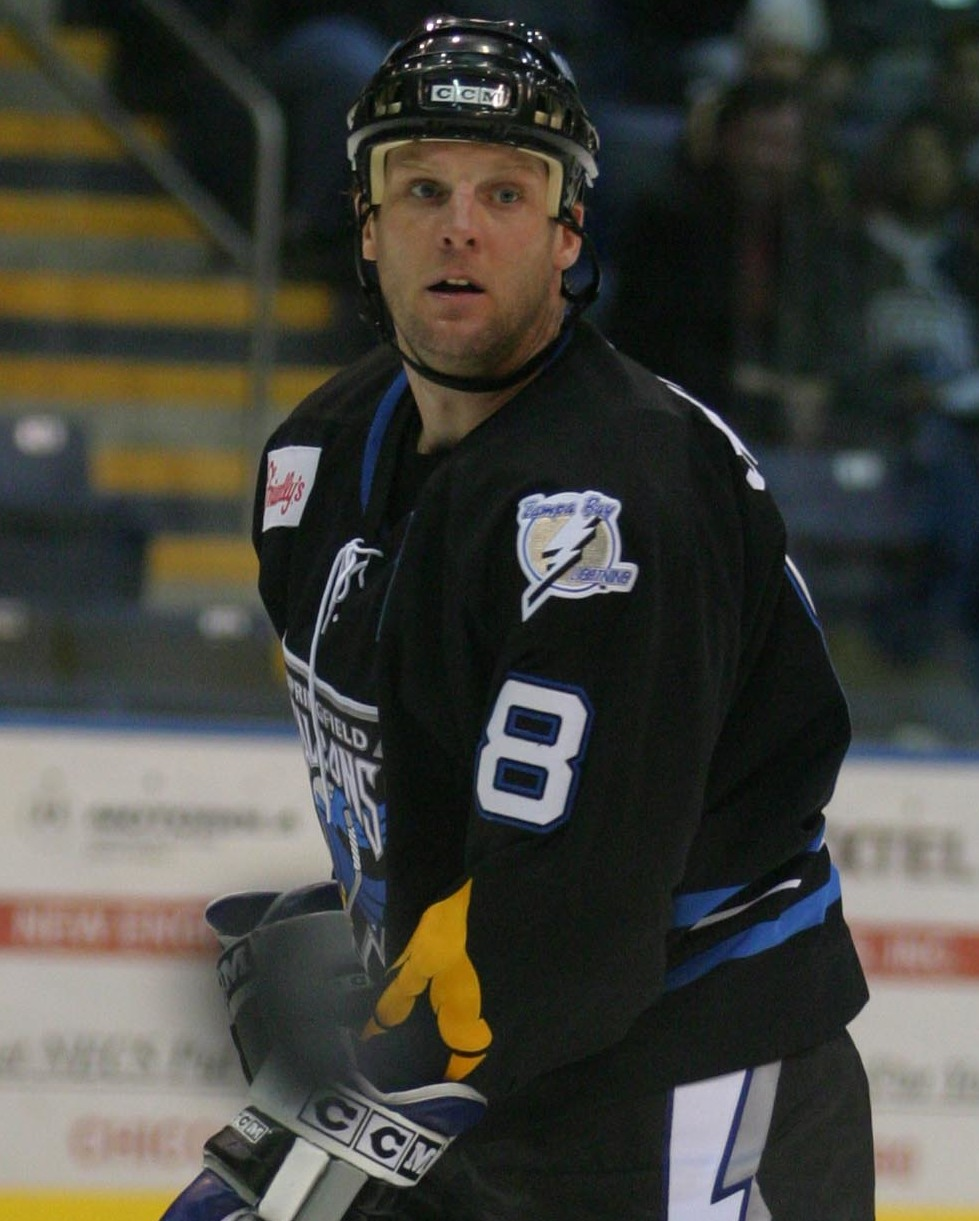
- Skalde with the Springfield Falcons in 2004
- Born: February 26, 1971 (age 55) Niagara Falls, Ontario, Canada
- Height: 6 ft 0 in (183 cm)
- Weight: 180 lb (82 kg; 12 st 12 lb)
- Position: Centre
- Shot: Left
- Played for: New Jersey Devils; Mighty Ducks of Anaheim; Calgary Flames; San Jose Sharks; Dallas Stars; Chicago Blackhawks; Atlanta Thrashers; Philadelphia Flyers; Lausanne HC; Leksands IF; Oji Eagles; HK Jesenice; Vlci Žilina
- NHL draft: 26th overall, 1989; New Jersey Devils
- Playing career: 1990–2008

Jarrod Skalde (born February 26, 1971) is a Canadian ice hockey coach and former player. He was born in Niagara Falls, Ontario. He was most recently the head coach of Slovak ice hockey team Vlci Zilina in Tipos Slovenská hokejová liga. His goal for the 2022-2023 season was to promote with Žilina to Tipos extraliga.

== Playing career ==
=== Junior hockey ===
Skalde was drafted by the Oshawa Generals of the Ontario Hockey League (OHL) in the first round, 15th overall in the 1987 OHL Priority Selection. In his rookie season with the Generals in 1987–88, Skalde scored 12 goals and 28 points in 60 games. In the post-season, Skalde scored two goals and three points in seven games.

In 1988–89, Skalde improved offensively, scoring 38 goals and 76 points in 65 games to finish fourth on team scoring. Skalde added a goal and six points in six playoff games, as the Generals were upset in the first round of the playoffs.

Skalde further improved during the 1989–90 season, scoring 40 goals, tied for the second-highest total on the team, and 92 points, which was the third-highest, in 62 games played, helping the Generals to the best record in the Leyden Division. In the post-season, Skalde had 10 goals and 17 points in 17 games, as Oshawa defeated the Kitchener Rangers to win the J. Ross Robertson Cup and earn a berth in the 1990 Memorial Cup. At the Memorial Cup tournament, Skalde scored two goals and five points in four games, as the Generals defeated the Kitchener Rangers in the final to win the championship.

Skalde returned to Oshawa for a fourth season in 1990–91, and in 15 games with the club, scored eight goals and 22 points. Skalde was then traded to the Belleville Bulls in a deal that sent Rob Pearson to the Generals. Skalde finished the 1990–91 season with Bulls, where in 40 games, he scored 30 goals and 82 points to finish second in team scoring. Overall, between the Generals and the Bulls, Skalde scored 38 goals and 104 points in 55 games, placing tenth in the OHL scoring race. In the post-season, Skalde scored nine goals and 15 points in six games. Following the season, Skalde was named to the OHL First All-Star team.

=== Professional career ===
==== New Jersey Devils ====
Skalde was drafted by the New Jersey Devils of the National Hockey League (NHL) in the second round, 26th overall, in the 1989 NHL entry draft. He appeared in his first NHL game on October 7, 1990, recording an assist in a 7–4 loss to the Pittsburgh Penguins, his only NHL game during the 1990–91 season. In three games with the Utica Devils of the American Hockey League (AHL) that season, Skalde scored three goals and five points.

Skalde spent the majority of the 1991–92 season in the AHL with Utica, where he scored 20 goals and 40 points in 62 games. He also appeared in 15 NHL games that season. On March 4, Skalde scored his first career NHL goal, the game-winning goal against Mike Richter of the New York Rangers in a 5–4 victory. Overall, Skalde scored two goals and six points in the NHL. In the post-season, he returned to Utica, where in four games, Skalde scored three goals and four points.

The 1992–93 season was spent mainly in Utica, as Skalde scored 21 goals and 60 points in 59 games. In five playoff games in the AHL, Skalde had two assists. Skalde appeared in 11 games with New Jersey during the 1992–93 season, earning two points in 11 games. Skalde also played in four games with the Cincinnati Cyclones of the International Hockey League (IHL), scoring a goal and three points.

On June 24, 1993, Skalde was left unprotected during the 1993 NHL Expansion Draft, and was selected by the Mighty Ducks of Anaheim.

==== Mighty Ducks of Anaheim ====
Skalde spent most of the 1993–94 season with the San Diego Gulls of the IHL, scoring 25 goals and 63 points in 58 games. In the post-season, Skalde led San Diego in scoring, with three goals and 15 points in nine games.

Skalde saw action in the NHL during the 1993–94 season with the Mighty Ducks of Anaheim, scoring the overtime winning goal against Curtis Joseph in a 2–1 win over the St. Louis Blues in his first game with the club on December 12. In his next game, on December 14, Skalde recorded his first multi-point NHL game, earning two assists in a 5–2 loss to the Detroit Red Wings. On December 17, he recorded his first career multi-goal game in the NHL, as Skalde scored twice against Darcy Wakaluk of the Dallas Stars in a 3–2 victory. In 20 games with the Mighty Ducks, Skalde recorded five goals and nine points.

In 1994–95, Skalde spent the entire season with the Las Vegas Thunder of the IHL, as in 74 games, he scored 34 goals and 75 points, finishing third in team scoring. In the post-season, Skalde added two goals and six points in nine games.

Skalde began the 1995–96 season with the Baltimore Bandits of the AHL, where in 11 games, he scored two goals and eight points.

On October 30, 1995, the Mighty Ducks traded Skalde to the Calgary Flames for Bobby Marshall.

==== Calgary Flames ====
Skalde was assigned to the Calgary Flames' AHL affiliate, the Saint John Flames, following his trade to the team. Skalde appeared in 68 games with Saint John, scoring 27 goals and 67 points to finish second in team scoring. In the playoffs, Skalde scored four goals and had a team high 13 points in 16 games, as the Flames lost in the Northern Conference finals.

Skalde also appeared in one game with Calgary during the 1995–96, getting no points.

In 1996–97, Skalde spent the season with Saint John. In 65 games, Skalde scored a team high 32 goals and 68 points. In three playoff games, Skalde was held pointless.

Following the season, Skalde was granted free agency.

==== 1997–98 season ====
Skalde appeared in his first game with the San Jose Sharks on October 25, earning an assist in a 4–3 win over the New Jersey Devils. He scored his first goal with the Sharks on November 12 against Arturs Irbe of the Vancouver Canucks in a 5–2 loss. In 22 games with San Jose, Skalde scored four goals and 10 points. On January 8, Skalde was claimed off of waivers by the Chicago Blackhawks.

Skalde appeared in his first game with the Blackhawks on January 10, as he was held off the scoresheet in a 4–3 victory over the Toronto Maple Leafs. On January 15, Skalde scored his first, and only, point with Chicago, earning an assist in a 3–2 loss to the Washington Capitals. On January 23, Skalde was reclaimed off waivers by the Sharks. Before Skalde could appear in another game with San Jose, the team placed him on waivers, and on January 27, the Dallas Stars claimed Skalde.

Skalde appeared in one game with the Stars following their waiver claim, spring no points in a 1–0 victory over the Philadelphia Flyers on February 4. On February 10, Skalde was reclaimed by Chicago Blackhawks off waivers. He appeared in three more games with Chicago, earning no points. On March 6, the Sharks again reclaimed Skalde off waivers. During his tenure with Chicago, Skalde appeared in two games with the IHL affiliate, the Indianapolis Ice, scoring two goals. Skalde finished the 1997–98 season with the Sharks' AHL affiliate, the Kentucky Thoroughblades, playing in 23 games and scoring five goals and 20 points. In the post-season, Skalde had three goals in three games.

==== San Jose Sharks ====
Skalde spent most of the 1998–99 season with Kentucky, as he scored 17 goals and 57 points in 54 games. In 12 playoff games, Skalde scored four goals and nine points. Skalde appeared in 17 games with the Sharks during the 1998–99 season, scoring a goal and two points. Following the season, Skalde was granted free agency.

==== Utah Grizzlies ====
Skalde signed with the Utah Grizzlies of the IHL for the 1999–00 season, leading the Grizzlies in points, with 25 goals and 54 assists, in 77 games. In five playoff games, Skalde was held to an assist. He was named to the IHL First All-Star team. Following the season, Skalde became a free agent.

==== Atlanta Thrashers ====
On July 21, 2000, Skalde signed with the Atlanta Thrashers, making his debut on October 7, in a 2–1 loss to the New York Rangers. He earned his first point with Atlanta on October 17, an assist, in a 3–3 tie against the New Jersey Devils. On October 25, Skalde scored his first goal as a Thrasher against Joaquin Gage of the Edmonton Oilers in a 3–1 victory. In 19 games with Atlanta, Skalde had a goal and three points.

Skalde spent most of the 2000–01 season with the Thrashers' IHL affiliate, the Orlando Solar Bears, scoring 14 goals and 54 points in 60 games. In the playoffs, Skalde added three goals and nine points in 15 games, helping Orlando win the Turner Cup.

In 2001–02, Skalde was assigned to the Thrashers' AHL affiliate, the Chicago Wolves, playing 64 games, scoring 15 goals and 52 points. On March 5, 2002, Skalde was traded by the Thrashers to the Philadelphia Flyers for Joe DiPenta.

==== Philadelphia Flyers ====
Skalde finished the 2001–02 season with the Flyers' AHL affiliate, the Philadelphia Phantoms. In 16 games with the Phantoms, Skalde had four goals and eight points and added two assists in four playoff games. Skalde appeared in one game with the Flyers during the 2001–02, held scoreless in a 3–1 loss to the Buffalo Sabres on April 1. After the season, Skalde was granted free agency.

==== Later career ====
Skalde signed with HC Lausanne of the National League A (NLA) in Switzerland. During the 2002–03 season, Skalde had seven goals and 15 points in 23 games.

Skalde signed with the Dallas Stars on July 17, 2003, and was assigned to the Utah Grizzlies, now in the AHL, for the 2003–04 season. In 77 games, Skalde led the club with 23 goals and 58 points. Skalde became a free agent after the season.

On July 28, 2004, Skalde signed a contract with the defending Stanley Cup champions, the Tampa Bay Lightning but never played for them, as the NHL season was cancelled due to the 2004–05 NHL lockout. Skalde instead began the 2004–05 season with the Springfield Falcons of the AHL, the Lightning's top affiliate, and in 15 games, Skalde had a goal and six points. On November 20, 2004, the Lightning loaned Skalde to the Utah Grizzlies with whom he finished the season, scoring seven goals and 22 points in 56 games. After the season, Skalde was traded to the Phoenix Coyotes for Jason Jaspers before becoming a free agent.

Skalde joined Leksands IF of the Swedish Elite League (SEL) for 2005–06. In 36 games, Skalde had four goals and nine points, as well as 120 penalty minutes. In the post-season, Skalde had no points in nine games. Skalde also appeared in two games with the San Antonio Rampage of the AHL, scoring a goal and three points with the team.

Skalde signed with the Oji Eagles of the Asia League Ice Hockey (ALIH) in 2006–07, a team based in Tomakomai, Japan. In 34 games, Skalde had 15 goals and 47 points, and in four playoff games, Skalde scored two goals.

The following season, Skalde played with HK Acroni Jesenice, scoring one goal in three games. In the post-season, Skalde appeared in six games, scoring a goal and three points.

Skalde played in ten games with the Bloomington Prairie Thunder of the newer International Hockey League in 2008, scoring five goals and nine points.

== Career statistics ==
=== Regular season and playoffs ===
			Regular season					Playoffs
Season	Team	League	GP	G	A	Pts	PIM	GP	G	A	Pts	PIM
1986–87	Fort Erie Meteors	GHL	41	27	34	61	36	—	—	—	—	—
1987–88	Oshawa Generals	OHL	60	12	16	28	24	7	2	1	3	2
1988–89	Oshawa Generals	OHL	65	38	38	76	36	6	1	5	6	2
1989–90	Oshawa Generals	OHL	62	40	52	92	66	17	10	7	17	6
1990–91	New Jersey Devils	NHL	1	0	1	1	0	—	—	—	—	—
1990–91	Oshawa Generals	OHL	15	8	14	22	14	—	—	—	—	—
1990–91	Belleville Bulls	OHL	40	30	52	82	21	6	9	6	15	10
1990–91	Utica Devils	AHL	3	3	2	5	0	—	—	—	—	—
1991–92	Utica Devils	AHL	62	20	20	40	56	4	3	1	4	8
1991–92	New Jersey Devils	NHL	15	2	4	6	4	—	—	—	—	—
1992–93	New Jersey Devils	NHL	11	0	2	2	4	—	—	—	—	—
1992–93	Cincinnati Cyclones	IHL	4	1	2	3	4	—	—	—	—	—
1992–93	Utica Devils	AHL	59	21	39	60	76	5	0	2	2	19
1993–94	Mighty Ducks of Anaheim	NHL	20	5	4	9	10	—	—	—	—	—
1993–94	San Diego Gulls	IHL	57	25	38	63	79	9	3	12	15	10
1994–95	Las Vegas Thunder	IHL	74	34	41	75	103	9	2	4	6	8
1995–96	Baltimore Bandits	AHL	11	2	6	8	55	—	—	—	—	—
1995–96	Saint John Flames	AHL	68	27	40	67	98	16	4	9	13	6
1995–96	Calgary Flames	NHL	1	0	0	0	0	—	—	—	—	—
1996–97	Saint John Flames	AHL	65	32	36	68	94	3	0	0	0	14
1997–98	San Jose Sharks	NHL	22	4	6	10	14	—	—	—	—	—
1997–98	Kentucky Thoroughblades	AHL	23	5	15	20	48	3	3	0	3	6
1997–98	Chicago Blackhawks	NHL	7	0	1	1	4	—	—	—	—	—
1997–98	Dallas Stars	NHL	1	0	0	0	0	—	—	—	—	—
1997–98	Indianapolis Ice	IHL	2	0	2	2	0	—	—	—	—	—
1998–99	San Jose Sharks	NHL	17	1	1	2	4	—	—	—	—	—
1998–99	Kentucky Thoroughblades	AHL	54	17	40	57	75	12	4	5	9	16
1999–00	Utah Grizzlies	IHL	77	25	54	79	98	5	0	1	1	10
2000–01	Atlanta Thrashers	NHL	19	1	2	3	20	—	—	—	—	—
2000–01	Orlando Solar Bears	IHL	60	14	40	54	56	15	3	6	9	20
2001–02	Chicago Wolves	AHL	64	15	37	52	71	—	—	—	—	—
2001–02	Philadelphia Phantoms	AHL	16	4	4	8	23	4	0	2	2	4
2001–02	Philadelphia Flyers	NHL	1	0	0	0	2	—	—	—	—	—
2002–03	Lausanne HC	SUI	23	7	8	15	28	—	—	—	—	—
2003–04	Utah Grizzlies	AHL	77	23	35	58	55	—	—	—	—	—
2004–05	Utah Grizzlies	AHL	56	7	15	22	53	—	—	—	—	—
2004–05	Springfield Falcons	AHL	15	1	5	6	16	—	—	—	—	—
2005–06	San Antonio Rampage	AHL	2	1	2	3	4	—	—	—	—	—
2005–06	Leksands IF	SHL	36	4	5	9	120	9	0	0	0	31
2006–07	Oji Eagles	AL	34	15	32	47	38	4	2	0	2	4
2007–08	Bloomington PrairieThunder	IHL	10	5	4	9	6	—	—	—	—	—
2007–08	HK Jesenice	EBEL	3	1	0	1	0	5	1	2	3	2
2007–08	HK Jesenice	SLO	—	—	—	—	—	1	0	0	0	0
AHL totals			575	178	296	474	724	47	14	19	33	73
NHL totals			115	13	21	34	62	—	—	—	—	—

== Coaching career ==
=== Bloomington PrairieThunder ===
Skalde joined the Bloomington PrairieThunder of the IHL as a player-assistant coach for the 2007-08 season, working with head coach Derek Booth. The PrairieThunder finished in last place in the six-team IHL during the 2007–08 season with a 31–38–3–4 record, earning 69 points.

Skalde was named the head coach of the club for the 2008–09 season. Bloomington finished the season in fifth place with a 29–40–2–5 record, earning 65 points and did not qualify for the post-season.

He returned to the team for the 2009–10 as Bloomington improved to a 31–34–5–6 record, earning 73 points. Despite the improvement, the club failed to make the post-season.

On August 10, 2010, Skalde resigned as head coach of the PrairieThunder.

=== Cincinnati Cyclones ===
On August 12, 2010, Skalde was named the head coach of the Cincinnati Cyclones of the ECHL. The Cyclones underwent numerous changes in the off-season after winning the Kelly Cup in 2009–10. The team was the ECHL affiliate for both the Buffalo Sabres and Nashville Predators.

In his first season with the Cyclones in 2010–11, Skalde led the team to a 33–29–6–4 record, earning 76 points and a playoff berth as the team finished in seventh place in the Eastern Conference. In the post-season, the Cyclones lost to the Reading Royals three games to one in the conference quarter-finals.

In 2011–12, the Cyclones became the ECHL affiliate for the Nashville Predators and Florida Panthers. Cincinnati saw an improvement in points, as the team earned a 35–28–2–7 record, earning 79 points, however, the Cyclones finished in 10th place in the Eastern Conference and failed to qualify for the playoffs.

Skalde returned for a third season with Cincinnati in 2012–13, as he led the team to a 42–22–5–3 record, earning 92 points and winning the North Division, helping the Cyclones into the post-season as the second seed in the Eastern Conference. In the post-season, the Cyclones defeated the Toledo Walleye in six games in the conference quarter-finals, followed by a six game series win over the Gwinnett Gladiators in the conference semi-finals. In the conference finals, the Cyclones lost to the Reading Royals in five games, ending their season.

Following the season, Skalde resigned as head coach of the Cyclones.

=== Norfolk Admirals ===
Skalde joined the Norfolk Admirals of the AHL as an assistant coach, working under head coach Trent Yawney. The Admirals were the AHL affiliate for the Anaheim Ducks.

In the 2013–14, the Admirals earned a record of 40–26–3–7, getting 90 points and qualifying for the playoffs as the eighth seed in the Eastern Conference. In the post-season, Norfolk upset the heavily favoured Manchester Monarchs in four games in the Eastern Conference quarter-finals. In the conference semi-finals, the Admirals lost to the St. John's IceCaps in six games. Following the season, head coach Trent Yawney was promoted to an assistant coach of the Anaheim Ducks, while Skalde was promoted to head coach of the Admirals.

On October 11, 2014, Skalde earned his first career AHL victory in his first game as the head coach, as the Admirals defeated the Hershey Bears 5–4. In his first season as head coach with Norfolk in 2014–15, the team struggled to a 27–39–6–4 record, earning 64 points and finishing in a last place tie with the Bridgeport Sound Tigers in the Eastern Conference. Following the season, Skalde and the Admirals parted ways.

=== Guelph Storm ===
Skalde was named head coach of the Guelph Storm of the OHL midway through the 2015–16 season. At the time of his hiring, the Storm had a record of 3–27–2–0. On December 29, 2015, Skalde coached his first game with Guelph, as the team earned a point in a 2–1 loss to the Erie Otters. Two days later, on December 31, Skalde earned his first career OHL victory, as Guelph defeated the Peterborough Petes 6–4. Under Skalde, the Storm saw some improvement, as they earned a record of 10–22–2–2. Overall, Guelph had a 13–49–4–2 record, finishing in last place in the league and missing the post-season.

Skalde returned to the Storm for the 2016–17 as the team continued to rebuild. In his second season with the Storm, the club improved to a 21–40–5–2 record, earning 49 points, which was a 17 point improvement over the previous season. Despite the improvement, Guelph once again finished out of the playoffs, finishing in last place in the Western Conference. Following the season, Skalde was fired by the Storm.

=== Wilkes-Barre/Scranton Penguins ===
On July 28, 2017, Skalde was named player development coach of the Pittsburgh Penguins.

After one season, Skalde was promoted to being an assistant coach of the Penguins AHL affiliate, the Wilkes-Barre/Scranton Penguins for the 2018–19 season, working with head coach Clark Donatelli. The Penguins finished the season with a 36–30–7–3 record, earning 82 points, however, the club failed to qualify for the post-season.

=== Cardiff Devils ===
Despite the 2020-21 Elite League season being suspended indefinitely because of ongoing coronavirus pandemic restrictions, on September 22, 2020, Skalde was introduced as the new head coach of UK EIHL side Cardiff Devils, replacing Andrew Lord. On April 8, 2022, after only one season with the Devils, Skalde was removed as head coach.

=== Japan men's national team ===
Skalde was named coach of the Japan men's national ice hockey team in 2024.

=== Head coaching record ===
Team	Year	Regular season							Postseason
Team	Year	G	W	L	OTL	SOL	Pts	Finish	Result
BLO	2008–09	76	29	40	5	2	66	6th in IHL	Did not qualify
BLO	2009–10	76	31	34	5	6	73	5th in IHL	Did not qualify
CIN	2010–11	72	33	29	6	4	76	3rd in North	Lost in first round
CIN	2011–12	72	35	28	2	7	79	3rd in North	Did not qualify
CIN	2012–13	72	42	22	5	3	92	1st in North	Lost in third round
NOR	2014–15	76	27	39	6	4	64	5th in East	Did not qualify
GUE	2015–16	36	10	22	2	2	24	5th in Midwest	Did not qualify
GUE	2016–17	68	21	40	5	2	49	5th in Midwest	Did not qualify
AHL Total		76	27	39	6	4	64		
ECHL Total		216	110	79	13	14	247		
IHL Total		152	60	74	10	8	138		
OHL Total		104	31	62	7	4	73		
