= Bryan Smolinski =

American ice hockey player (born 1971)

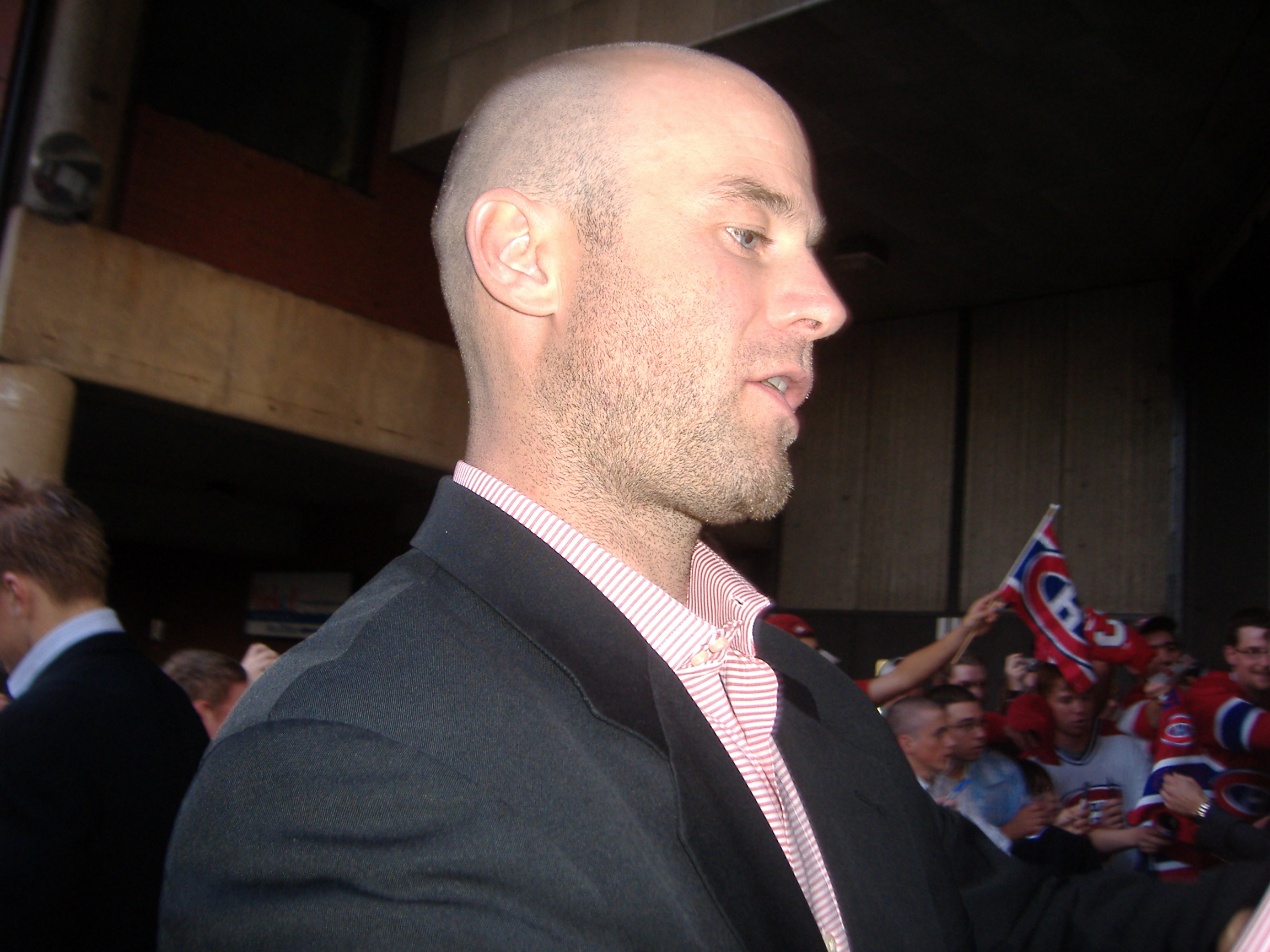
- Smolinski in 2007
- Born: December 27, 1971 (age 54) Toledo, Ohio, U.S.
- Height: 6 ft 1 in (185 cm)
- Weight: 205 lb (93 kg; 14 st 9 lb)
- Position: Center
- Shot: Right
- Played for: Boston Bruins; Pittsburgh Penguins; New York Islanders; Los Angeles Kings; Ottawa Senators; Chicago Blackhawks; Vancouver Canucks; Montreal Canadiens
- National team: United States
- NHL draft: 21st overall, 1990; Boston Bruins
- Playing career: 1992–2010

Bryan Anthony Smolinski (born December 27, 1971) is an American former professional ice hockey center. The Boston Bruins drafted him 21st overall in 1990. He played in the National Hockey League (NHL) for the Pittsburgh Penguins, New York Islanders, Los Angeles Kings, Ottawa Senators, Chicago Blackhawks, Vancouver Canucks and Montreal Canadiens. He had also previously played with the Port Huron Icehawks of the International Hockey League (IHL).

== Playing career ==
=== Drafted ===
Smolinski grew up in Genoa, Ohio and graduated from Cardinal Stritch High School in Oregon, Ohio. He played junior hockey for the Stratford Cullitons and played college hockey for the Michigan State Spartans. After his freshman year, the Boston Bruins drafted him in the first round (21st overall) in the 1990 NHL entry draft. Smolinski completed a four-year tenure with the Spartans before joining the Bruins for the end of the 1992–93 season.

=== National Hockey League ===
In his rookie campaign of 1993–94 Smolinski tallied 31 goals and 51 points. After a 31-point season in the shortened 1994–95 campaign, Smolinski was traded in the summer of 1995 alongside Glen Murray to the Pittsburgh Penguins for Kevin Stevens and Shawn McEachern. In his only season with the Penguins in 1995–96, he scored a career-high 40 assists and 64 points. However, Smolinski and the Penguins could not agree on a new contract in the off-season and he sat out the start of the next season, playing for the Detroit Vipers of the IHL. In November 1996, general manager Mike Milbury of the New York Islanders traded defenseman Darius Kasparaitis and rookie Andreas Johansson for the rights to negotiate a contract with Smolinski.

Smolinski played three seasons for the Islanders before being traded in June 1999 as part of an eight-player deal that saw him, Žigmund Pálffy, goaltender Marcel Cousineau, and fourth-round selection previously acquired from the New Jersey Devils (Daniel Johansson) traded to the Los Angeles Kings for Olli Jokinen, Josh Green, Mathieu Biron, and a first-round selection (Taylor Pyatt). Smolinski played four seasons for the Kings, before being traded to the Ottawa Senators at the trade deadline for defense prospect Tim Gleason on March 11, 2003.

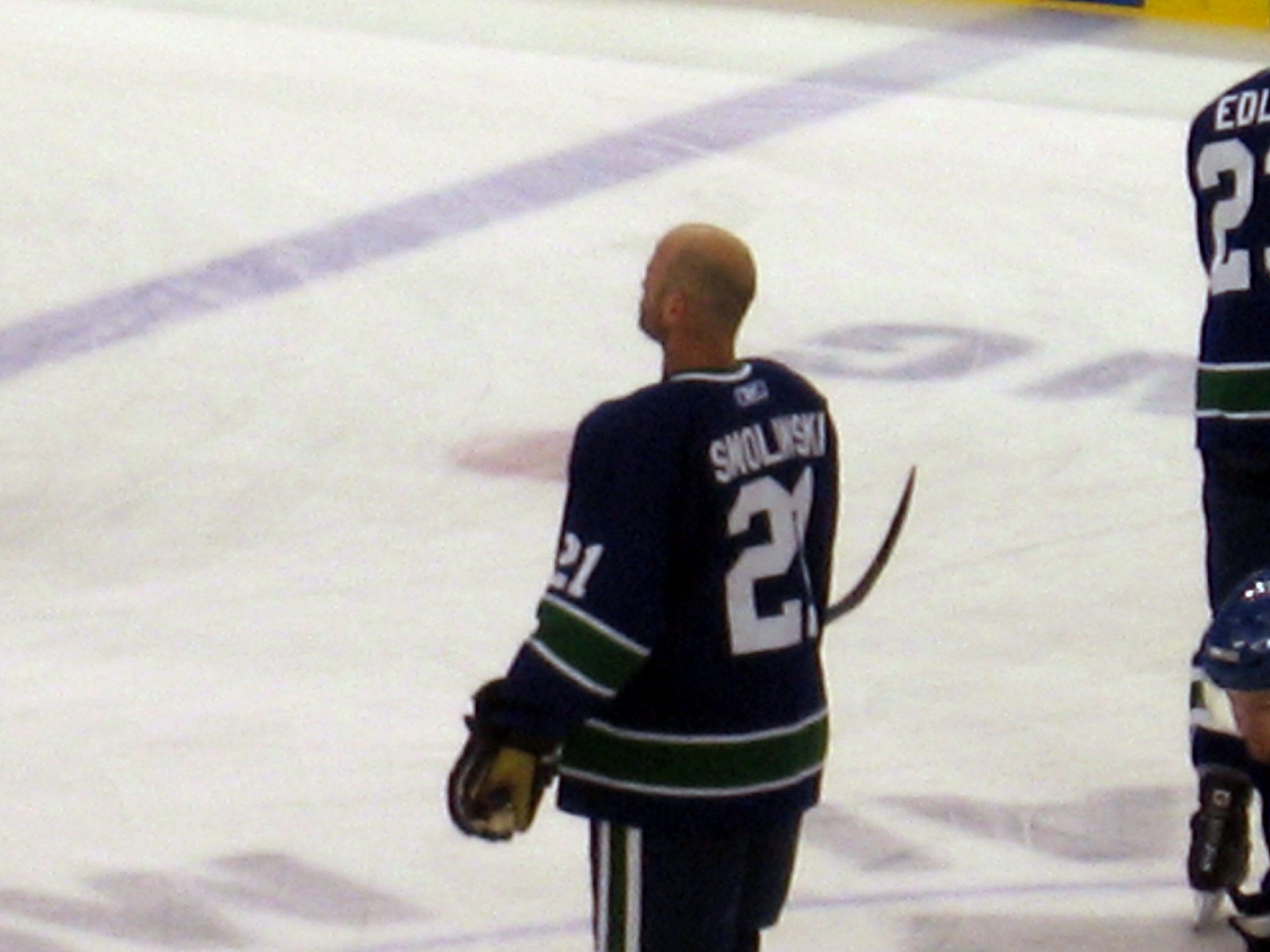
Smolinski with the Vancouver Canucks in 2007.

During the 2004–05 NHL lockout, Smolinski was an assistant hockey coach at Cranbrook Kingswood before briefly playing for the Motor City Mechanics of the United Hockey League (UHL). Returning to the Senators for the 2005–06 season, he was traded in the subsequent off-season on July 9, 2006, to the Chicago Blackhawks in a three-way deal with the Senators and San Jose Sharks. Smolinski started the 2006–07 season with the Blackhawks but was later traded prior to the trade deadline to the Vancouver Canucks on February 26, 2007, for a conditional second round draft pick.

Becoming a free agent in the 2007 off-season, Smolinski signed a one-year contract with the Montreal Canadiens on July 2, 2007. On October 22, Smolinski played in his 1,000th career game, against the Bruins.

=== After the NHL ===
After his stint with the Montreal Canadiens, Smolinski began an assistant coaching job for a Michigan high school team, Birmingham Unified. With Smolinski's help, the team became District Champions for the first time in four years.

Without an NHL job, on February 24, 2009, Smolinski signed a deal with the Port Huron Icehawks of the IHL. On April 30, 2009, Smolinski signed a deal with the Milwaukee Admirals of the AHL. He is currently working with the National Hockey League as a regional director in their Learn To Play (LTP) program. In 2015, he was inducted into the National Polish-American Sports Hall of Fame.

Smolinski also referees high school hockey in Michigan.

== Career statistics ==
=== Regular season and playoffs ===
			Regular season					Playoffs
Season	Team	League	GP	G	A	Pts	PIM	GP	G	A	Pts	PIM
1987–88	Detroit Little Caesars	MNHL	80	43	77	120	—	—	—	—	—	—
1988–89	Stratford Cullitons	MWJHL	46	32	62	94	132	—	—	—	—	—
1989–90	Michigan State University	CCHA	39	10	17	27	45	—	—	—	—	—
1990–91	Michigan State University	CCHA	35	9	12	21	24	—	—	—	—	—
1991–92	Michigan State University	CCHA	44	30	35	65	59	—	—	—	—	—
1992–93	Michigan State University	CCHA	40	31	37	68	91	—	—	—	—	—
1992–93	Boston Bruins	NHL	9	1	3	4	0	4	1	0	1	2
1993–94	Boston Bruins	NHL	83	31	20	51	82	13	5	4	9	4
1994–95	Boston Bruins	NHL	44	18	13	31	31	5	0	1	1	4
1995–96	Pittsburgh Penguins	NHL	81	24	40	64	69	18	5	4	9	10
1996–97	Detroit Vipers	IHL	6	5	7	12	10	—	—	—	—	—
1996–97	New York Islanders	NHL	64	28	28	56	25	—	—	—	—	—
1997–98	New York Islanders	NHL	81	13	30	43	34	—	—	—	—	—
1998–99	New York Islanders	NHL	82	16	24	40	49	—	—	—	—	—
1999–2000	Los Angeles Kings	NHL	79	20	36	56	48	4	0	0	0	2
2000–01	Los Angeles Kings	NHL	78	27	32	59	40	13	1	5	6	14
2001–02	Los Angeles Kings	NHL	80	13	25	38	56	7	2	0	2	2
2002–03	Los Angeles Kings	NHL	58	18	20	38	18	—	—	—	—	—
2002–03	Ottawa Senators	NHL	10	3	5	8	2	18	2	7	9	6
2003–04	Ottawa Senators	NHL	80	19	27	46	49	7	1	1	2	4
2004–05	Motor City Mechanics	UHL	21	9	23	32	18	—	—	—	—	—
2005–06	Ottawa Senators	NHL	81	17	31	48	46	10	3	3	6	2
2006–07	Chicago Blackhawks	NHL	62	14	23	37	29	—	—	—	—	—
2006–07	Vancouver Canucks	NHL	19	4	3	7	8	12	2	2	4	8
2007–08	Montreal Canadiens	NHL	64	8	17	25	20	12	1	2	3	2
2008–09	Port Huron Icehawks	IHL	21	9	21	30	18	6	3	3	6	9
2008–09	Milwaukee Admirals	AHL	—	—	—	—	—	7	3	1	4	6
2009–10	Flint Generals	IHL	48	24	25	49	42	12	3	12	15	4
NHL totals			1,055	274	377	651	606	123	23	29	52	60

=== International ===
Year	Team	Event	GP	G	A	Pts	PIM
1990	United States	WJC	7	2	3	5	8
1996	United States	WCH	6	0	5	5	0
1998	United States	WC	6	3	1	4	10
1999	United States	WC	6	3	3	6	8
2004	United States	WCH	3	1	0	1	0
Senior totals			21	7	9	16	18

== See also ==
- List of NHL players with 1,000 games played

== Championships ==
2016 Michigan Amateur Hockey Association 30+ Recreational Division State Champions

== Awards and honors ==
Award	Year
All-CCHA First Team	1992–93
AHCA West First-Team All-American	1992–93
Hobey Baker Award Finalist (Top Player in the NCAA)	1993

Sporting positions
Preceded by Shayne Stevenson	Boston Bruins first-round draft pick 1990	Succeeded by Glen Murray
