= Justin Hodgman =

Canadian ice hockey player (born 1988)

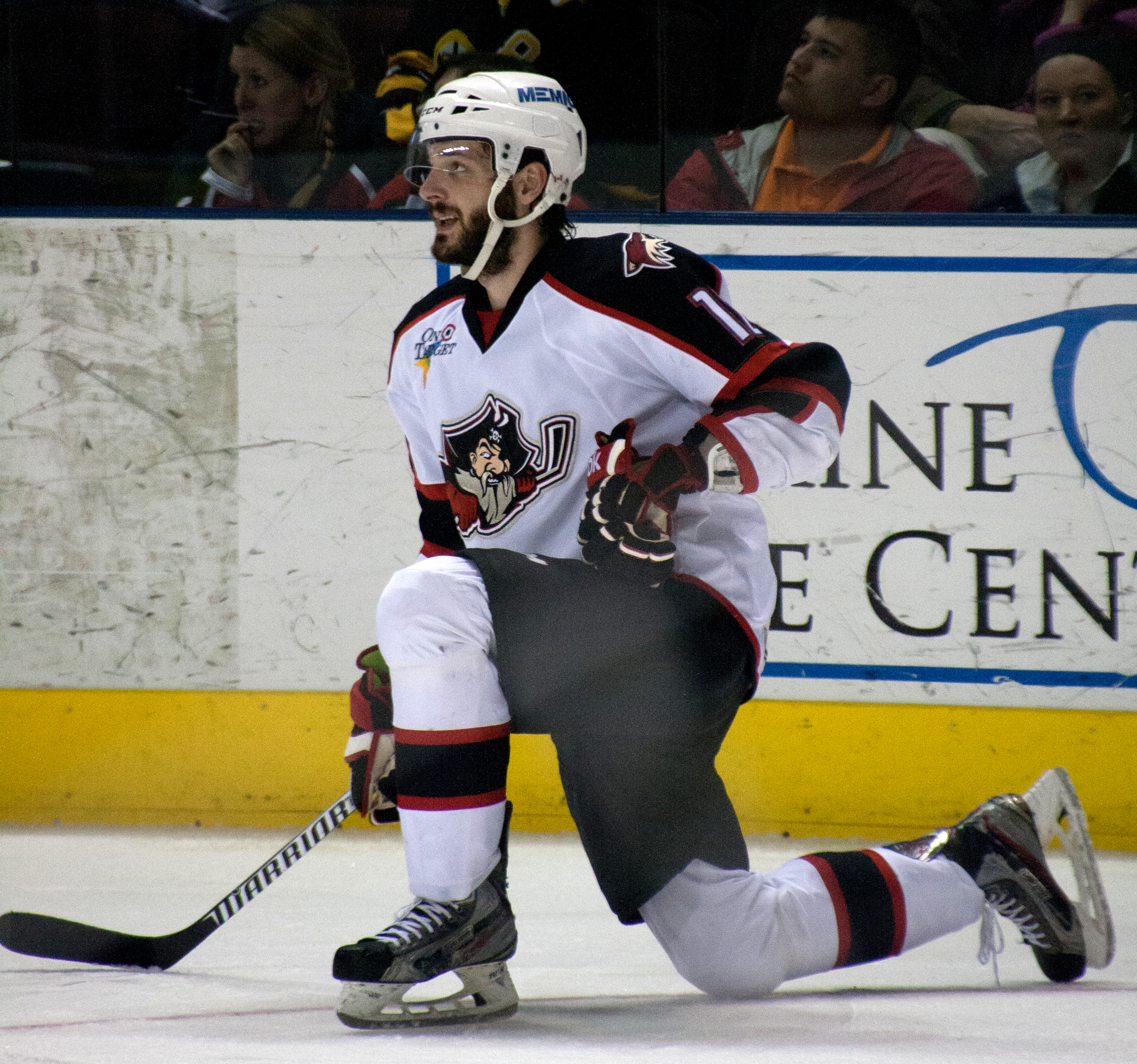
- Born: June 27, 1988 (age 38) Brampton, Ontario, Canada
- Height: 6 ft 2 in (188 cm)
- Weight: 196 lb (89 kg; 14 st 0 lb)
- Position: Centre
- Shot: Right
- Played for: Pelicans; Metallurg Magnitogorsk; Torpedo Nizhny Novgorod; Admiral Vladivostok; Arizona Coyotes; Örebro HK; HC Dynamo Pardubice; Krefeld Pinguine; Ferencvárosi TC; Sheffield Steelers
- NHL draft: Undrafted
- Playing career: 2008–2022

Justin Hodgman (born June 27, 1988) is a retired Canadian professional ice hockey player who last played for UK Elite Ice Hockey League (EIHL) side Sheffield Steelers.

== Playing career ==
Hodgman was a three-time Turner Cup champion with the Fort Wayne Komets in the IHL. He is the youngest player in IHL history to win the Turner Cup playoff MVP award at the age of 19. He played junior hockey for the Erie Otters of the OHL. While playing for the Erie Otters he led the team in scoring three of his four seasons 2007, 2008, 2009. After going undrafted by NHL clubs, he signed as a free agent with the Rockford IceHogs of the American Hockey League in 2009. In his first full professional season in 2009–10, Hodgman was loaned to the ECHL team Toledo Walleye before he was traded by the IceHogs to the Toronto Marlies to play out the year on January 21, 2010.

After three seasons abroad in Finnish Liiga and the Russian Kontinental Hockey League, Hodgman returned to North America signing a one-year two way contract with the Arizona Coyotes on July 1, 2014. Despite a strong training camp, Hodgman was assigned to begin the year with the Portland Pirates. On October 25, 2015, Hodgman was recalled by Arizona and in his first NHL game, he scored his first career goal on the powerplay against Roberto Luongo of the Florida Panthers. Hodgman was unable to secure a regular role with the Coyotes, appearing in 5 games.

On July 8, 2015, Hodgman continued in North America, signing a one-year two-way contract with the St. Louis Blues. In the 2015–16 season, Hodgman was reassigned to add depth to AHL affiliate, the Chicago Wolves. He appeared in 15 games with the Wolves, producing 6 assists, before opting to return to Europe. After clearing unconditional waivers and accepting a mutual termination of his contract with the Blues, Hodgman signed an optional two-year deal with Swedish club, Örebro HK of the top tier SHL on January 4, 2016.

Hodgman split the 2016–17 season, between HC Dynamo Pardubice of the Czech Extraliga and Pelicans of the Liiga. In scoring 20 points in 26 games in his second stint with the Pelicans.

Hodgman opted to return in the offseason to his first professional club, the Fort Wayne Komets of the ECHL on July 18, 2017. Hodgman played two further seasons in Fort Wayne, before returning to Europe following the 2018–19 campaign in signing a one-year contract with German club, Krefeld Pinguine of the DEL, on May 29, 2019.

Hodgman continued his career abroad in the 2020–21 season moving to Ferencvárosi TC of the Erste Liga in Budapest, Hungary.

In June 2021, UK EIHL side Sheffield Steelers announced Hodgman had signed terms ahead of the 2021–22 season. Hodgman retired from hockey in April 2022 following Sheffield's play-off quarter-final defeat to the Dundee Stars.

== Career statistics ==
=== Regular season and playoffs ===
			Regular season					Playoffs
Season	Team	League	GP	G	A	Pts	PIM	GP	G	A	Pts	PIM
2004–05	Huntsville Otters	OPJHL	44	10	10	20	36	—	—	—	—	—
2005–06	Erie Otters	OHL	57	7	13	20	55	—	—	—	—	—
2006–07	Erie Otters	OHL	67	19	32	51	63	—	—	—	—	—
2007–08	Erie Otters	OHL	64	37	43	80	75	—	—	—	—	—
2007–08	Fort Wayne Komets	IHL	11	4	4	8	7	13	7	7	14	12
2008–09	Erie Otters	OHL	66	24	42	66	71	5	0	1	1	4
2008–09	Fort Wayne Komets	IHL	6	2	3	5	20	11	7	5	12	16
2009–10	Toledo Walleye	ECHL	33	9	12	21	35	—	—	—	—	—
2009–10	Toronto Marlies	AHL	38	7	5	12	23	—	—	—	—	—
2009–10	Fort Wayne Komets	IHL	3	1	2	3	0	10	4	13	17	8
2010–11	Toronto Marlies	AHL	42	12	17	29	44	—	—	—	—	—
2010–11	Reading Royals	ECHL	3	0	1	1	4	—	—	—	—	—
2011–12	Lahti Pelicans	SM-l	59	14	39	53	123	17	3	8	11	42
2012–13	Metallurg Magnitogorsk	KHL	51	11	20	31	46	7	1	1	2	18
2013–14	Metallurg Magnitogorsk	KHL	18	3	6	9	12	—	—	—	—	—
2013–14	Torpedo Nizhny Novgorod	KHL	14	1	6	7	6	—	—	—	—	—
2013–14	Admiral Vladivostok	KHL	17	3	7	10	12	5	1	3	4	2
2014–15	Portland Pirates	AHL	62	11	24	35	55	—	—	—	—	—
2014–15	Arizona Coyotes	NHL	5	1	0	1	2	—	—	—	—	—
2015–16	Chicago Wolves	AHL	15	0	6	6	21	—	—	—	—	—
2015–16	Örebro HK	SHL	11	1	3	4	2	—	—	—	—	—
2016–17	HC Pardubice	CZE	5	0	2	2	0	—	—	—	—	—
2016–17	Lahti Pelicans	FIN	26	10	10	20	80	4	1	1	2	4
2017–18	Fort Wayne Komets	ECHL	30	9	16	25	26	1	0	0	0	0
2018–19	Fort Wayne Komets	ECHL	50	15	41	56	53	4	0	1	1	17
2019–20	Krefeld Pinguine	DEL	33	2	14	16	12	—	—	—	—	—
2020–21	Ferencvárosi TC	Erste Liga	33	14	26	40	14	8	3	3	6	—
2021–22	Sheffield Steelers	EIHL	51	10	24	34	24	2	0	0	0	0
KHL totals			100	22	35	57	76	12	2	4	6	20
NHL totals			5	1	0	1	2	—	—	—	—	—
