= 2011–12 Quad City Mallards season =

Hockey season

2011–12 Quad City Mallards
- League: 8th CHL
- Conference: 5th Turner
- 2011–12 record: 37-27-2
- Home record: 20-11-2
- Road record: 17-16-0
- Goals for: 230
- Goals against: 201

Team information
- General manager: David Bell
- Coach: David Bell
- Captain: Darren McMillan
- Arena: i Wireless Center
- Average attendance: 3,353

Team leaders
- Goals: Brandon Marino (41)
- Assists: Brandon Marino (49)
- Points: Brandon Marino (90)
- Penalty minutes: Jason Kostadine (189)
- Plus/minus: Darren McMillan (+24)
- Wins: David McKee (17)
- Goals against average: David Brown (2.86)

The 2011–12 Quad City Mallards season was the second season in the Central Hockey League of the CHL franchise in Moline, Illinois.

== Regular season ==
=== Conference standings ===
Updated May 12, 2012.

Turner Conference	GP	W	L	OTL	GF	GA	Pts
Fort Wayne Komets	66	40	19	7	228	187	87
Evansville IceMen	66	40	22	4	215	192	84
Missouri Mavericks	66	39	21	6	223	200	84
Rapid City Rush	66	38	22	6	226	176	82
Quad City Mallards	66	37	27	2	230	201	76
Dayton Gems	66	23	29	14	185	228	60
Bloomington Blaze	66	24	35	7	183	244	55

== Transactions ==
The Mallards have been involved in the following transactions during the 2011–12 season.

Trades

July 29, 2011	To Wichita Thunder: Adam Russo	To Quad City: Future Considerations

== Roster ==
No.	Nat	Player	Pos	S/G	Age	Acquired	Birthplace	Contract
12	(United States)	Obi Aduba	LW	L	40	2009	Walpole, Massachusetts	Mallards
15	(United States)	Jared Brown	RW	R	39	2011	Gardner, Kansas	Mallards
	(Canada)	Brad Fogal	G	L	39	2011	Sharon, Ontario	Mallards
21	(United States)	Joel Gasper (A)	C	R	41	2009	Crookston, Minnesota	Mallards
23	(United States)	Eric Giosa	C	L	40	2010	Northville, Michigan	Mallards
10	(United States)	Jason Kostadine	RW	R	41	2010	St. Louis, Missouri	Mallards
	(Sweden)	Karl Linden	D	L	38	2011	Sundbyberg, Sweden	Mallards
13	(United States)	Brandon Marino	RW	R	38	2009	Riverside, California	Mallards
6	(Canada)	Darren McMillan (C)	D	R	44	2010	Sault Ste. Marie, Ontario	Mallards
	(United States)	David McKee	G	L	41	2011	Odessa, Texas	Mallards
3	(United States)	Bobby Preece	D		39	2010	Bonita Springs, Florida	Mallards
	(Canada)	Quinn Waller	D		38	2011	Windsor, Ontario	Mallards

== See also ==
- 2011–12 CHL season
