= 2011–12 Rapid City Rush season =

2011–12 Rapid City Rush
- League: 6th Central Hockey League
- Conference: 4th Turner
- 2011–12 record: 38-22-6
- Home record: 21-9-3
- Road record: 17-13-3
- Goals for: 226
- Goals against: 176

Team information
- General manager: Tim Hill
- Coach: Joe Ferras
- Assistant coach: Mark DeSantis
- Captain: Scott Wray
- Alternate captains: Riley Weselowski; Shawn Limpright
- Arena: Rushmore Plaza Civic Center
- Average attendance: 4,700

Team leaders
- Goals: Konrad Reeder (37)
- Assists: Shawn Limpright (53)
- Points: Konrad Reeder (82)
- Penalty minutes: Anthony Perdicaro (109)
- Plus/minus: Riley Weselowski (+23)
- Wins: Tim Boron (24)
- Goals against average: Tim Boron (2.44)

The 2011–12 Rapid City Rush season is the fourth season in the Central Hockey League for the professional ice hockey franchise in Rapid City, South Dakota.

== Regular season ==
=== Conference standings ===
Updated May 12, 2012.

| Turner Conference | GP | W | L | OTL | GF | GA | Pts |
|---|---|---|---|---|---|---|---|
| Fort Wayne Komets | 66 | 40 | 19 | 7 | 228 | 187 | 87 |
| Evansville IceMen | 66 | 40 | 22 | 4 | 215 | 192 | 84 |
| Missouri Mavericks | 66 | 39 | 21 | 6 | 223 | 200 | 84 |
| Rapid City Rush | 66 | 38 | 22 | 6 | 226 | 176 | 82 |
| Quad City Mallards | 66 | 37 | 27 | 2 | 230 | 201 | 76 |
| Dayton Gems | 66 | 23 | 29 | 14 | 185 | 228 | 60 |
| Bloomington Blaze | 66 | 24 | 35 | 7 | 183 | 244 | 55 |

== Transactions ==
The Rush have been involved in the following transactions during the 2011–12 season.

Trades

| October 19, 2011 | To Wichita Thunder: Jarred Mohr | To Rapid City: Future Considerations |

== Roster ==
Updated Dec 12, 2011.

| No. | Nat | Player | Pos | S/G | Age | Acquired | Birthplace | Contract |
|---|---|---|---|---|---|---|---|---|
| 3 | (United States) | Garrett Gruenke | D | L | 42 | 2012 | Plymouth, Minnesota | Rush |
| 6 | (Canada) | Riley Weselowski (A) | D | R | 41 | 2009 | Pilot Mound, Manitoba | Rush |
| 7 | (Canada) | Dominic D'Amour | D | L | 42 | 2012 | Lasalle, Quebec | Rush |
| 7 | (United States) | Joe Grimaldi | D | R | 40 | 2011 | Ronkonkoma, New York | Rush |
| 9 | (United States) | Anthony Perdicaro | F | L | 37 | 2011 | East Rockaway, New York | Rush |
| 11 | (Canada) | Collin Cercelli | F | L | 44 | 2011 | Oshawa, Ontario | Rush |
| 12 | (United States) | Patrick Knowlton | F | L | 40 | 2011 | Slingerlands, New York | Rush |
| 13 | (Canada) | Blake Forsyth | D | L | 47 | 2011 | Winnipeg, Manitoba | Rush |
| 16 | (Canada) | Jeff Kyrzakos | F | R | 41 | 2011 | Toronto, Ontario | Rush |
| 17 | (Canada) | Scott Wray (C) | F | L | 46 | 2009 | Ottawa, Ontario | Rush |
| 19 | (Canada) | Kelly Czuy | F | R | 43 | 2012 | Edmonton, Alberta | Rush |
| 19 | (Canada) | Derek Knowles | F | L | 41 | 2011 | Vanderhoof, British Columbia | Rush |
| 21 | (Canada) | Konrad Reeder | F | R | 44 | 2010 | Vanderhoof, British Columbia | Rush |
| 22 | (United States) | Jordan Behler | D | L | 39 | 2011 | Port Jefferson, New York | Rush |
| 23 | (Canada) | Les Reaney | F | L | 42 | 2008 | Ceylon, Saskatchewan | Rush |
| 25 | (Finland) | Mike Vaskivuo | F | L | 40 | 2011 | Helsinki, Finland | Rush |
| 26 | (Canada) | Shawn Limpright (A) | F | L | 45 | 2011 | St. Adolphe, Manitoba | Rush |
| 28 | (Canada) | Jesse Schultz | F | R | 44 | 2010 | Regina, Saskatchewan | Rush |
| 29 | (Canada) | Andrew Smale | F | R | 44 | 2010 | Bowmanville, Ontario | Rush |
| 30 | (Canada) | Danny Battochio | G | | 40 | 2009 | Lively, Ontario | Rush |
| 31 | (Canada) | Tim Boron | G | | 43 | 2010 | Winnipeg, Manitoba | Rush |
| 40 | (Canada) | Michael Couch | D | L | 43 | 2011 | Halifax, Nova Scotia | Rush |

== See also ==
- 2011–12 CHL season
