= Brian Felsner =

American ice hockey player (born 1972)

- Born: November 7, 1972 (age 52); Mount Clemens, Michigan, U.S.
- Height: 5 ft 11 in (180 cm)
- Weight: 189 lb (86 kg; 13 st 7 lb)
- Position: Left wing
- Shot: Left
- Played for: Chicago Blackhawks
- NHL draft: Undrafted
- Playing career: 1996–2008

Brian Lee Felsner (born November 7, 1972) is an American former professional ice hockey left winger who played 12 games with the Chicago Blackhawks in the National Hockey League during the 1997–98 season. The rest of his career, which lasted from 1996 to 2008, was spent in the minor leagues and then in various European leagues. Felsner's brother Denny was also a professional hockey player.

== Playing career ==
As a youth, Felsner played in the 1985 and 1986 Quebec International Pee-Wee Hockey Tournaments with the Detroit Compuware and Detroit Red Wings minor ice hockey teams.

Felsner played twelve games for the Chicago Blackhawks during the 1997–98 NHL season, scoring a goal and three assists for four points. He first moved to Europe in 2001, playing in Germany's Deutsche Eishockey Liga for Kassel Huskies. He then played two seasons in the Swedish Elitserien for Linköpings HC and four games in Switzerland's Nationalliga A for the Kloten Flyers before returning to Germany to play for Augsburger Panther.

He returned to Elitserien to play for Brynäs IF and then returned to American to play for the Port Huron Icehawks of the International Hockey League before moving to Slovenia to finish his career with HDD Olimpija Ljubljana of the Austrian Hockey League.

== Career statistics ==
=== Regular season and playoffs ===
| | | | Regular season | | | | | Playoffs |
| Season | Team | League | GP | G | A | Pts | PIM | GP | G | A | Pts | PIM |
|---|---|---|---|---|---|---|---|---|---|---|---|---|
| 1992–93 | Compuware Ambassadors | NAHL | 50 | 25 | 35 | 60 | — | — | — | — | — | — |
| 1993–94 | Lake Superior State | CCHA | 6 | 1 | 1 | 2 | 6 | — | — | — | — | — |
| 1994–95 | Lake Superior State | CCHA | 41 | 24 | 28 | 52 | 48 | — | — | — | — | — |
| 1995–96 | Lake Superior State | CCHA | 40 | 17 | 36 | 53 | 44 | — | — | — | — | — |
| 1996–97 | Orlando Solar Bears | IHL | 75 | 29 | 41 | 70 | 38 | 7 | 2 | 3 | 5 | 6 |
| 1997–98 | Indianapolis Ice | IHL | 53 | 17 | 36 | 53 | 36 | — | — | — | — | — |
| 1997–98 | Milwaukee Admirals | IHL | 15 | 7 | 8 | 15 | 20 | 10 | 3 | 9 | 12 | 12 |
| 1997–98 | Chicago Blackhawks | NHL | 12 | 1 | 3 | 4 | 12 | — | — | — | — | — |
| 1998–99 | Detroit Vipers | IHL | 72 | 20 | 35 | 55 | 49 | 11 | 4 | 6 | 10 | 12 |
| 1999–00 | Houston Aeros | IHL | 28 | 7 | 16 | 23 | 20 | — | — | — | — | — |
| 1999–00 | Cincinnati Cyclones | IHL | 38 | 15 | 17 | 32 | 18 | 11 | 4 | 5 | 9 | 20 |
| 2000–01 | Cincinnati Cyclones | IHL | 73 | 27 | 38 | 65 | 62 | 5 | 3 | 2 | 5 | 6 |
| 2001–02 | Lowell Lock Monsters | AHL | 25 | 3 | 10 | 13 | 20 | — | — | — | — | — |
| 2001–02 | Kassel Huskies | DEL | 24 | 5 | 11 | 16 | 24 | 7 | 1 | 0 | 1 | 8 |
| 2002–03 | Linköpings HC | SEL | 31 | 10 | 4 | 14 | 40 | — | — | — | — | — |
| 2003–04 | Kloten Flyers | NLA | 4 | 0 | 1 | 1 | 8 | — | — | — | — | — |
| 2003–04 | Linköpings HC | SEL | 38 | 13 | 15 | 28 | 63 | — | — | — | — | — |
| 2004–05 | Augsburger Panther | DEL | 43 | 11 | 12 | 23 | 89 | 5 | 4 | 0 | 4 | 8 |
| 2005–06 | Port Huron Flags | UHL | 15 | 3 | 13 | 16 | 20 | — | — | — | — | — |
| 2005–06 | Brynäs IF | SEL | 17 | 3 | 5 | 8 | 14 | 4 | 0 | 1 | 1 | 0 |
| 2006–07 | Herning IK | DEN | 15 | 11 | 10 | 21 | 30 | — | — | — | — | — |
| 2006–07 | EHC Biel | NLB | 16 | 14 | 17 | 31 | 46 | 9 | 3 | 7 | 10 | 10 |
| 2007–08 | EHC Biel | NLB | 6 | 2 | 6 | 8 | 0 | — | — | — | — | — |
| 2007–08 | Port Huron Icehawks | IHL | 11 | 5 | 14 | 19 | 12 | — | — | — | — | — |
| 2007–08 | HDD Olimpija Ljubljana | EBEL | 14 | 4 | 9 | 13 | 8 | 14 | 1 | 1 | 2 | 16 |
| IHL totals | | | 354 | 122 | 191 | 313 | 243 | 44 | 16 | 24 | 41 | 56 |
| NHL totals | | | 12 | 1 | 3 | 4 | 12 | — | — | — | — | — |
