= 2012 Central Hockey League All-Star Game =

Exhibition event

2012 CHL All-Star Game
	1	2	3	Total
CHL All-Stars	2	1	3	6
Arizona Sundogs	1	2	1	4
- Date: January 11, 2012
- Arena: Tim's Toyota Center
- City: Prescott Valley, Arizona
- MVP: Brandon Marino (CHL); Kevin Petovello (ARZ)
- Attendance: 4,479

The 2012 Central Hockey League All-Star Game was held on January 11, 2012, at Tim's Toyota Center in Prescott Valley, Arizona, home of the Arizona Sundogs, in the 2011–12 CHL season. The Sundogs lost 6–4 to the CHL's All-Stars.
