= 2011–12 Bloomington Blaze season =

2011–12 Bloomington Blaze
- League: 12th CHL
- Conference: 7th Turner
- 2011–12 record: 24-35-7
- Home record: 14-16-3
- Road record: 10-19-4
- Goals for: 183
- Goals against: 244

Team information
- General manager: Jim Riggs
- Coach: Paul Gardner
- Arena: U.S. Cellular Coliseum
- Average attendance: 2,276

Team leaders
- Goals: Jon Booras (27)
- Assists: Vladimir Nikiforov (30)
- Points: Jon Booras (53)
- Penalty minutes: Craig Cescon (180)
- Plus/minus: Vladimir Nikiforov (+1); Omar Pacha; Doug Krantz
- Wins: Zane Kalemba (18)
- Goals against average: Zane Kalemba (3.47)

The 2011–12 Bloomington Blaze season was the first season of the Central Hockey League (CHL) franchise in Bloomington, Illinois.

== Regular season ==
=== Conference standings ===
Updated May 12, 2012.

Turner Conference	GP	W	L	OTL	GF	GA	Pts
Fort Wayne Komets	66	40	19	7	228	187	87
Evansville IceMen	66	40	22	4	215	192	84
Missouri Mavericks	66	39	21	6	223	200	84
Rapid City Rush	66	38	22	6	226	176	82
Quad City Mallards	66	37	27	2	230	201	76
Dayton Gems	66	23	29	14	185	228	60
Bloomington Blaze	66	24	35	7	183	244	55

== Transactions ==
The Blaze have been involved in the following transactions during the 2011–12 season.

Trades

October 20, 2011	To Wichita Thunder: Future Considerations	To Bloomington: Craig Cescon; Matt Whitehead

== See also ==
- 2011–12 CHL season
