= 2011–12 Dayton Gems season =

2011–12 Dayton Gems (2009–2012)
- League: 11th CHL
- Conference: 6th Turner
- 2011–12 record: 23–29–14
- Home record: 13–12–8
- Road record: 10–17–6
- Goals for: 185
- Goals against: 228

Team information
- Coach: Brian Gratz
- Assistant coach: Chris Lipsett
- Captain: Greg Labenski
- Arena: Hara Arena
- Average attendance: 2,228

Team leaders
- Goals: Damian Surma (31)
- Assists: Brett Lutes (42)
- Points: Damian Surma (65)
- Penalty minutes: Kyle Bochek (122)
- Plus/minus: Damian Surma (+7)
- Wins: Larry Sterling (12)
- Goals against average: Dan Dunn (2.61)

The 2011–12 Dayton Gems season was the second season in the Central Hockey League of the CHL franchise in Dayton, Ohio.

== Regular season ==
=== Conference standings ===
Updated May 12, 2012.

Turner Conference	GP	W	L	OTL	GF	GA	Pts
Fort Wayne Komets	66	40	19	7	228	187	87
Evansville IceMen	66	40	22	4	215	192	84
Missouri Mavericks	66	39	21	6	223	200	84
Rapid City Rush	66	38	22	6	226	176	82
Quad City Mallards	66	37	27	2	230	201	76
Dayton Gems	66	23	29	14	185	228	60
Bloomington Blaze	66	24	35	7	183	244	55

== Roster ==
Updated December 11, 2011.

No.	Nat	Player	Pos	S/G	Age	Acquired	Birthplace	Contract
21	(Canada)	Kyle Bochek	C	L	36	2010	Port Severn, Ontario	Gems
27	(Canada)	Greg Labenski (C)	D	L	46	2009	Welland, Ontario	Gems
11	(United States)	Matthew Larke	RW	R	37	2010	Oxford, Michigan	Gems
72	(Canada)	Chris Lipsett	RW	R	50	2009	Brandon, Manitoba	Gems
19	(Canada)	Brett Lutes	LW	L	43	2010	Riverview, New Brunswick	Gems
11	(United States)	Nino Musitelli	F	R	39	2011	Macomb, Michigan	Gems
24	(United States)	Brandon Naurato	LW	L	40	2010	Livonia, Michigan	Gems
9	(Canada)	Jonathan Ornelas	F	L	38	2009	Mississauga, Ontario	Gems
15	(United States)	Damian Surma	C	L	44	2011	Lincoln Park, Michigan	Gems
25	(Canada)	Andy Zulyniak	D	L	40	2011	Winnipeg, Manitoba	Gems

== See also ==
- 2011–12 CHL season
