= Lukáš Bohunický =

Slovak ice hockey player

- Born: 30 October 1987 (age 38) Bratislava, Czechoslovakia
- Height: 6 ft 4 in (193 cm)
- Weight: 220 lb (100 kg; 15 st 10 lb)
- Position: Defence
- Shoots: Left
- Slovak Extraliga team Former teams: HK Dukla Trenčín; HC Slovan Bratislava
- Playing career: 2007–present

Lukáš Bohunický (born 30 October 1987) is a Slovak professional ice hockey defenceman. He is currently playing for HK Dukla Trenčín of the Slovak Extraliga.

== Career ==
Bohunický played professionally for HC Slovan Bratislava in the Slovak Extraliga and HK Ruzinov 99 Bratislava in Slovak 2. Liga. He spent his Junior Hockey career playing two seasons for the Kootenay Ice of the Canadian Western Hockey League. He has also played on the Slovakia men's national under-18 ice hockey team in the IIHF World U18 Championship and Slovakia's national under-17 ice hockey team in the World Under-17 Hockey Challenge.

On 8 February 2012 he was signed by the Missouri Mavericks of the Central Hockey League for the remainder of the 2011–12 season. On 19 October 2012 he signed with BK Mladá Boleslav.

== Career statistics ==
			Regular season					Playoffs
Season	Team	League	GP	G	A	Pts	PIM	GP	G	A	Pts	PIM
2005–06	Kootenay Ice	WHL	59	2	7	9	52	6	0	1	1	2
2006–07	Kootenay Ice	WHL	71	1	6	7	101	7	0	2	2	14
2007–08	HC Slovan Bratislava	Slovak	27	0	1	1	43	13	0	1	1	2
2007–08	HK Ruzinov	Slovak2	16	1	3	4	26	4	0	0	0	4
2008–09	HC Slovan Bratislava	Slovak	45	0	3	3	69	12	0	3	3	47
2008–09	HK Ruzinov	Slovak2	4	0	2	2	29	—	—	—	—	—
2009–10	HC Slovan Bratislava	Slovak	45	2	9	11	72	15	0	1	1	4
2010–11	HC Slovan Bratislava	Slovak	54	2	2	4	111	7	0	0	0	14
2011–12	HC Slovan Bratislava	Slovak	32	0	3	3	42	—	—	—	—	—
2011–12	Missouri Mavericks	CHL	12	0	3	3	8	—	—	—	—	—
2012–13	BK Mlada Boleslav	Czech2	36	0	5	5	75	10	0	1	1	10
2013–14	BK Mlada Boleslav	Czech2	33	1	3	4	113	5	0	0	0	6
2013–14	HC Ceske Budejovice	Czech3	8	0	0	0	8	—	—	—	—	—
2014–15	Edinburgh Capitals	EIHL	33	1	13	14	29	—	—	—	—	—
2014–15	HC Ceske Budejovice	Czech2	2	0	0	0	12	11	0	3	3	6
2015–16	HC Ceske Budejovice	Czech2	33	0	6	6	49	7	0	0	0	6
Slovak totals			246	7	21	28	391	47	0	5	5	67
Czech2 totals			112	1	14	15	257	33	0	4	4	28
