= Todd Robinson (ice hockey) =

Canadian ice hockey player

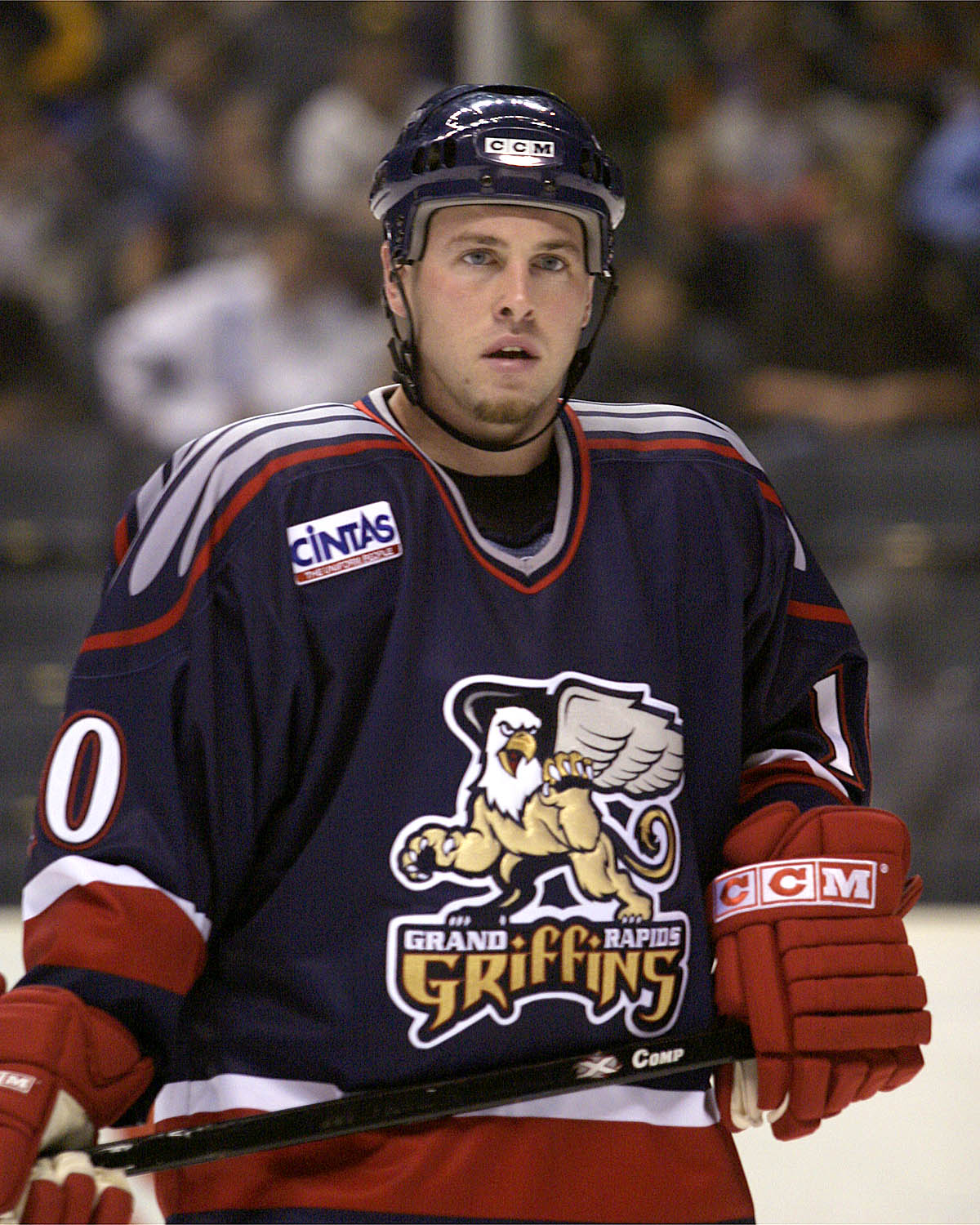
- Robinson with the Grand Rapids Griffins during the 2004-05 season
- Born: June 16, 1978 (age 47) Trail, British Columbia, Canada
- Height: 5 ft 9 in (175 cm)
- Weight: 185 lb (84 kg; 13 st 3 lb)
- Position: Centre
- Shot: Right
- Played for: Idaho Steelheads; Colorado Gold Kings; Muskegon Fury; Chicago Wolves; Hamilton Bulldogs; Cincinnati Mighty Ducks; Grand Rapids Griffins; SønderjyskE; Muskegon Lumberjacks; Odessa Jackalopes; Evansville IceMen; Allen Americans; Tulsa Oilers
- NHL draft: Undrafted
- Playing career: 1999–2014

Todd Robinson (born June 16, 1978) is a Canadian former professional ice hockey center. He predominantly played in the minor hockey leagues most notably with the Muskegon Fury and the Muskegon Lumberjacks. He last played in the 2013–14 season with the Tulsa Oilers of the Central Hockey League before announcing his retirement and taking up an assistant coaching role with major junior team, the Muskegon Lumberjacks of the United States Hockey League.

== Awards and honours ==
Honours	Year
Jim Piggott Memorial Trophy – WHL Rookie of the Year	1994–95
Bob Clarke Trophy – WHL Scoring Leader	1996–97
WHL West First All-Star Team	1996-97
WHL West Second All-Star Team	1997-98
IHL Leading Scorer	2008–09
IHL Most Valuable Player	2008–09
IHL Leading Scorer	2009–10
All-CHL Team (First Team All-Star)	2011–12

== Career statistics ==
			Regular season					Playoffs
Season	Team	League	GP	G	A	Pts	PIM	GP	G	A	Pts	PIM
1994–95	Portland Winter Hawks	WHL	67	21	57	78	40	9	4	4	8	4
1995–96	Portland Winter Hawks	WHL	72	28	63	91	63	7	6	4	10	14
1996–97	Portland Winter Hawks	WHL	71	38	96	134	67	6	2	3	5	4
1997–98	Portland Winter Hawks	WHL	71	35	74	109	55	16	6	21	27	28
1997–98	Portland Winter Hawks	MC	—	—	—	—	—	4	2	6	8	4
1998–99	Portland Winter Hawks	WHL	36	22	35	57	46	4	3	3	6	8
1999–2000	Idaho Steelheads	WCHL	62	26	63	89	40	—	—	—	—	—
1999–2000	Colorado Gold Kings	WCHL	9	4	8	12	8	7	3	7	10	10
2000–01	Muskegon Fury	UHL	61	36	64	100	82	5	3	4	7	16
2000–01	Chicago Wolves	IHL	2	0	1	1	0	—	—	—	—	—
2000–01	Hamilton Bulldogs	AHL	15	2	7	9	0	—	—	—	—	—
2000–01	Cincinnati Mighty Ducks	AHL	—	—	—	—	—	3	1	2	3	4
2001–02	Muskegon Fury	UHL	74	21	71	92	26	17	4	20	24	12
2002–03	Muskegon Fury	UHL	56	16	43	59	40	9	0	10	10	4
2003–04	Muskegon Fury	UHL	72	25	81	106	42	11	2	8	10	10
2004–05	Muskegon Fury	UHL	34	15	34	49	28	17	6	16	22	34
2004–05	Grand Rapids Griffins	AHL	40	7	19	26	6	—	—	—	—	—
2005–06	Muskegon Fury	UHL	56	21	63	84	68	12	3	10	13	10
2006–07	Muskegon Fury	UHL	76	44	79	123	93	11	3	7	10	20
2007–08	SønderjyskE	DNK	45	21	43	64	32	13	3	13	16	14
2008–09	Muskegon Fury	IHL	67	23	89	112	84	11	3	12	15	6
2009–10	Muskegon Fury	IHL	74	21	88	109	48	7	3	7	10	20
2010–11	Odessa Jackalopes	CHL	62	29	70	99	49	9	3	13	16	10
2011–12	Evansville Icemen	CHL	66	23	69	92	68	4	3	1	4	0
2012–13	Evansville Icemen	ECHL	57	7	61	68	32	—	—	—	—	—
2012–13	Allen Americans	CHL	5	1	6	7	4	19	6	16	22	20
2013–14	Tulsa Oilers	CHL	48	17	57	74	42	6	1	2	3	0
UHL/IHL totals			570	222	612	824	511	100	27	94	121	132
CHL totals			181	70	202	272	163	38	13	32	45	30
