= 2011–12 Evansville IceMen season =

American ice hockey club season

2011–12 Evansville IceMen
- League: 4th CHL
- Conference: 2nd Turner
- 2011–12 record: 40-22-4
- Home record: 21-11-1
- Road record: 19-11-3
- Goals for: 215
- Goals against: 192

Team information
- General manager: Richard Kromm
- Coach: Richard Kromm
- Captain: Todd Robinson
- Alternate captains: Matt Gens; Pihilippe Plante
- Arena: Ford Center
- Average attendance: 4,882

Team leaders
- Goals: Brian Bicek (33)
- Assists: Todd Robinson (42)
- Points: Todd Robinson (69)
- Penalty minutes: Mario Boillard (193)
- Wins: Bryan Gillis (26)
- Goals against average: Bryan Gillis (2.51)

The 2011–12 Evansville IceMen season was the second season of the Central Hockey League (CHL) franchise in Evansville, Indiana.

== Regular season ==
=== Conference standings ===
Updated May 12, 2012.

Turner Conference	GP	W	L	OTL	GF	GA	Pts
Fort Wayne Komets	66	40	19	7	228	187	87
Evansville IceMen	66	40	22	4	215	192	84
Missouri Mavericks	66	39	21	6	223	200	84
Rapid City Rush	66	38	22	6	226	176	82
Quad City Mallards	66	37	27	2	230	201	76
Dayton Gems	66	23	29	14	185	228	60
Bloomington Blaze	66	24	35	7	183	244	55

== Transactions ==
The IceMen have been involved in the following transactions during the 2011–12 season.

Free agents acquired

Player	Former team	Date
Todd Robinson	Odessa Jackalopes	June 24, 2011
Matt Gens	Odessa Jackalopes	June 27, 2011
Steve Makway	Dundee Stars	June 29, 2011

Free agents lost

Player	New team	Date
Mario Larocque	Elmira Jackals	July 13, 2011

Players re-signed

Player	Date
Jake Obermeyer	June 6, 2011
Mark Cody	June 17, 2011
Matt Pierce	July 7, 2011

Lost via retirement

Player
Jeff Nelson

== Roster ==
No.	Nat	Player	Pos	S/G	Age	Acquired	Birthplace	Contract
4	(Sweden)	Karl Linden	D	L	38	2011-2012	Stockholm, Sweden	IceMen
7	(United States)	Chad Langlais	D	L	39	2011–2012	Spokane, Washington	IceMen
8	(Canada)	Jordan Little	D	L	44	2010–2011	Winnipeg, Manitoba	IceMen
9	(United States)	Jake Obermeyer	D	R	41	2010–2011	Chanhassen, Minnesota	IceMen
10	(United States)	Brian Bicek	F	L	40	2010–2011	Downers Grove, Illinois	IceMen
11	(Canada)	Mike Sgroi	F	L	47	2011–2012	Toronto, Ontario	IceMen
15	(Canada)	Mario Boillard	C	L	36	2011–2012	Sainte Justine De Newton, Quebec	IceMen
16	(United States)	Sean Oconnor	RW	R	39	2011–2012	Brownstown, Michigan	IceMen
17	(United States)	John Ronan	RW	R	42	2011–2012	South Boston, Massachusetts	IceMen
18	(Canada)	Mark Cody	LW	L	43	2010–2011	Halifax, Nova Scotia	IceMen
19	(Canada)	Todd Robinson (C)	C	R	47	2011–2012	Trail, British Columbia	IceMen
20	(Canada)	Josh Beaulieu	LW	L	39	2011–2012	Comber, Ontario	IceMen
22	(United States)	Matt Gens (A)	D	R	42	2011–2012	Baudette, Minnesota	IceMen
24	(Canada)	Philippe Plante (A)	D	L	47	2011–2012	Greenfield Park, Quebec	IceMen
25	(Sweden)	Niklas Lindberg	C	L	45	2010–2011	Stockholm, Sweden	IceMen
26	(Canada)	Matt Pierce	LW	L	40	2010–2011	Arnprior, Ontario	IceMen
27	(Canada)	Steve Makway	D	L	42	2011–2012	Trail, British Columbia	IceMen
30	(Canada)	Bryan Gillis	G	R	37	2011–2012	Halifax, Nova Scotia	IceMen
34	(Canada)	Malcolm Gwilliam	F	L	41	2011–2012	Kamloops, British Columbia	IceMen
38	(Canada)	Pier-Olivier Pelletier	G	R	38	2011–2012	Saint-Louis-du-Ha! Ha!, Quebec	IceMen

== See also ==
- 2011–12 CHL season
