= Dustin Friesen =

Canadian-German ice hockey player

- Born: March 1, 1983 (age 43) Waldheim, Saskatchewan, Canada
- Height: 6 ft 0 in (183 cm)
- Weight: 200 lb (91 kg; 14 st 4 lb)
- Position: Defenseman
- Shot: Left
- Played for: Bridgeport Sound Tigers; Chicago Wolves; ERC Ingolstadt
- NHL draft: Undrafted
- Playing career: 2009–2020

Dustin Friesen (born March 1, 1983) is a Canadian former professional ice hockey player who played in the American Hockey League (AHL) and the Deutsche Eishockey Liga (DEL).

== Playing career ==
Friesen played five seasons of college hockey at the University of New Brunswick before turning professional in 2009. He spent time with the ECHL's Utah Grizzlies and Idaho Steelheads, both of the ECHL, and the Bridgeport Sound Tigers of the AHL.

On September 22, 2011, Friesen signed a two-way contract with the Chicago Wolves of the AHL, before being optioned to the Missouri Mavericks, the Wolves' CHL affiliate. On October 7, 2011, Friesen was recalled by the Wolves from the Mavericks, before ever playing a game with the Mavericks. On December 3, 2011, Friesen was optioned by the Wolves to the Mavericks again. On December 6, 2011, Friesen was recalled by the Wolves from the Mavericks for a second time.

In the 2012–13 season, Friesen opted to pursue a European career and signed a contract with German club, the Fischtown Pinguins of the 2nd Bundesliga. Dustin re-signed for a second season with the Pinguins after he was voted the Best Defenseman of the league for the season.

After two successful years in the DEL2, Friesen attracted the attention of the top-level German league and signed a one-year contract with DEL club, ERC Ingolstadt on June 10, 2014.

Friesen enjoyed six years with Iserlohn, captaining the club in his final two seasons before leaving as a free agent following the interrupted 2019–20 season due to the COVID-19 pandemic. On April 3, 2019, Friesen was signed to extend his career in the DEL with a one-year contract agreed with the Iserlohn Roosters.

With the ongoing COVID pandemic complicating family considerations and having secured the opportunity to pursue a career in coaching near his hometown in Saskatchewan, Friesen, before beginning his contract with Iserlohn, abruptly announced his retirement after 11 professional seasons on August 12, 2020.

== Career statistics ==
			Regular season					Playoffs
Season	Team	League	GP	G	A	Pts	PIM	GP	G	A	Pts	PIM
2000–01	Swift Current Broncos	WHL	61	3	8	11	33	17	0	0	0	0
2001–02	Swift Current Broncos	WHL	58	5	10	15	29	12	0	1	1	11
2002–03	Swift Current Broncos	WHL	67	7	16	23	40	4	2	0	2	7
2003–04	Swift Current Broncos	WHL	72	11	21	32	39	5	1	1	2	2
2004–05	University of New Brunswick	USports	28	11	10	21	16	4	0	0	0	0
2005–06	University of New Brunswick	USports	28	4	7	11	8	8	0	3	3	6
2006–07	University of New Brunswick	USports	25	3	14	17	16	6	1	5	6	0
2007–08	University of New Brunswick	USports	28	3	21	24	26	5	4	1	5	4
2008–09	University of New Brunswick	USports	28	8	12	20	12	6	1	2	3	2
2009–10	Utah Grizzlies	ECHL	33	2	9	11	20	—	—	—	—	—
2009–10	Idaho Steelheads	ECHL	30	3	15	18	4	15	1	12	13	6
2009–10	Bridgeport Sound Tigers	AHL	8	1	1	2	4	—	—	—	—	—
2010–11	Idaho Steelheads	ECHL	35	2	15	17	12	9	1	2	3	4
2010–11	Bridgeport Sound Tigers	AHL	20	1	2	3	6	—	—	—	—	—
2011–12	Chicago Wolves	AHL	19	1	2	3	4	—	—	—	—	—
2011–12	Missouri Mavericks	CHL	1	0	1	1	0	—	—	—	—	—
2012–13	Fischtown Pinguins	2.GBun	47	12	20	32	26	7	1	3	4	10
2013–14	Fischtown Pinguins	DEL2	54	5	28	33	16	17	0	10	10	2
2014–15	ERC Ingolstadt	DEL	52	4	22	26	22	18	2	1	3	12
2015–16	ERC Ingolstadt	DEL	52	3	11	14	4	2	1	0	1	2
2016–17	ERC Ingolstadt	DEL	52	2	13	15	10	2	0	0	0	0
2017–18	ERC Ingolstadt	DEL	46	2	4	6	16	5	0	1	1	4
2018–19	ERC Ingolstadt	DEL	52	0	6	6	22	7	0	3	3	2
2019–20	ERC Ingolstadt	DEL	52	1	7	8	36	—	—	—	—	—
AHL totals			47	3	5	8	14	—	—	—	—	—
DEL totals			306	12	63	75	110	34	3	5	8	20
