= Ryan Jardine =

Canadian ice hockey player (born 1980)

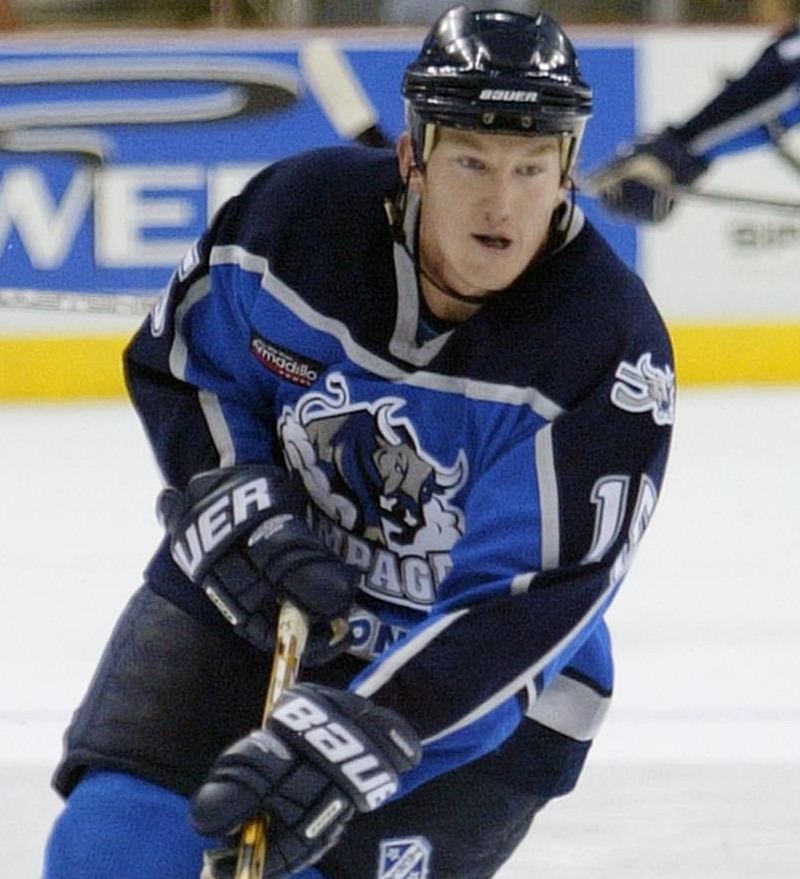
- Jardine with the San Antonio Rampage during the 2004-05 season
- Born: March 15, 1980 (age 46) Carleton Place, Ontario, Canada
- Height: 6 ft 0 in (183 cm)
- Weight: 194 lb (88 kg; 13 st 12 lb)
- Position: Left wing
- Shot: Left
- Played for: Florida Panthers; Hamburg Freezers; Mora IK; Olimpija Ljubljana; HC Bolzano; Lørenskog IK
- NHL draft: 89th overall, 1998; Florida Panthers
- Playing career: 2000–2014

Ryan Jardine (born March 15, 1980) is a Canadian former professional Ice Hockey forward. He played 8 games in the National Hockey League with the Florida Panthers during the 2001–02 season. The rest of his career, which lasted from 2000 to 2014, was spent in the minor American Hockey League and later in several European leagues.

== Playing career ==
Jardine was born in Carleton Place, Ontario, and played major junior with the Sault Ste. Marie Greyhounds of the Ontario Hockey League and his Junior A with the Kanata Stallions of the Canadian Junior Hockey League. Jardine was drafted 89th overall in the 1998 NHL entry draft by the Florida Panthers of the National Hockey League.

After spending the 2000–01 AHL season with the Louisville Panthers of the American Hockey League (AHL), Jardine played eight games for the Panthers during the 2001–02 NHL season with two assists. Jardine played in 64 regular season games and four playoff games for the Utah Grizzlies of the AHL during the 2001–02 AHL season and then spent the next three seasons with the San Antonio Rampage, also of the AHL. Jardine then moved to Europe, signing with the Hamburg Freezers of the Deutsche Eishockey Liga in Germany. After one season with the Freezers, he signed with the Swedish Elitserien team Mora IK and then with the Slovenian team HDD Olimpija Ljubljana of the Erste Back Eishockey Liga. In 2007, Jardine signed with HC Interspar Bolzano-Bozen of Serie A in Itay, where he played for three seasons. On September 30, 2010, the Missouri Mavericks of the Central Hockey League (CHL) signed Jardine for the 2010–2011 Central Hockey League season.

On September 3, 2011, Jardine signed with Lørenskog IK of GET-ligaen. On September 21, 2011, after playing two games and accumulating 2 Assists for Lørenskog IK, Jardine was granted his request to be released by the team for familial reasons. On October 2, 2011, Jardine signed with the Chicago Wolves of the AHL, and was reassigned to the Mavericks, the Wolves' new CHL affiliate, the next day. On September 8, 2012, Jardine returned to the Mavericks for the 2012–13 season by directly signing with the team.

On August 1, 2013, Jardine signed with the Cornwall River Kings of Ligue Nord-Américaine de Hockey.

In July 2014, Missouri Mavericks fans voted Jardine the fourth-greatest Mavericks player in a poll of the Top-10 Mavericks players from the first 5 years of the team's existence.

== Career statistics ==
=== Regular season and playoffs ===
| | | | Regular season | | | | | Playoffs |
| Season | Team | League | GP | G | A | Pts | PIM | GP | G | A | Pts | PIM |
|---|---|---|---|---|---|---|---|---|---|---|---|---|
| 1995–96 | Ottawa Valley Titans U15 | HEU U15 | — | — | — | — | — | — | — | — | — | — |
| 1996–97 | Kanata Valley Lasers | CJHL | 52 | 30 | 27 | 57 | 76 | — | — | — | — | — |
| 1997–98 | Sault Ste. Marie Greyhounds | OHL | 65 | 28 | 32 | 60 | 16 | — | — | — | — | — |
| 1998–99 | Sault Ste. Marie Greyhounds | OHL | 68 | 27 | 34 | 61 | 56 | 5 | 0 | 1 | 1 | 6 |
| 1999–00 | Sault Ste. Marie Greyhounds | OHL | 65 | 43 | 34 | 77 | 58 | 17 | 11 | 8 | 19 | 16 |
| 2000–01 | Louisville Panthers | AHL | 77 | 12 | 14 | 26 | 38 | — | — | — | — | — |
| 2001–02 | Florida Panthers | NHL | 8 | 0 | 2 | 2 | 2 | — | — | — | — | — |
| 2001–02 | Utah Grizzlies | AHL | 64 | 16 | 16 | 32 | 56 | 4 | 1 | 1 | 2 | 0 |
| 2002–03 | San Antonio Rampage | AHL | 64 | 14 | 17 | 31 | 37 | 3 | 1 | 0 | 1 | 0 |
| 2003–04 | San Antonio Rampage | AHL | 22 | 6 | 1 | 7 | 12 | — | — | — | — | — |
| 2004–05 | San Antonio Rampage | AHL | 77 | 14 | 20 | 34 | 72 | — | — | — | — | — |
| 2005–06 | Hamburg Freezers | DEL | 31 | 5 | 6 | 11 | 22 | 6 | 0 | 0 | 0 | 2 |
| 2006–07 | Mora IK | SWE | 51 | 1 | 8 | 9 | 28 | 4 | 0 | 0 | 0 | 8 |
| 2007–08 | Olimpija Ljubljana | EBEL | 27 | 5 | 8 | 13 | 65 | — | — | — | — | — |
| 2007–08 | HC Bolzano | ITA | 18 | 4 | 9 | 13 | 12 | 12 | 4 | 4 | 8 | 8 |
| 2008–09 | HC Bolzano | ITA | 42 | 12 | 29 | 41 | 20 | 6 | 1 | 3 | 4 | 6 |
| 2009–10 | HC Bolzano | ITA | 38 | 16 | 13 | 29 | 24 | 13 | 6 | 5 | 11 | 6 |
| 2010–11 | Missouri Mavericks | CHL | 66 | 23 | 31 | 54 | 65 | 9 | 5 | 6 | 11 | 6 |
| 2011–12 | Lørenskog IK | NOR | 2 | 0 | 1 | 1 | 0 | — | — | — | — | — |
| 2011–12 | Missouri Mavericks | CHL | 31 | 11 | 11 | 22 | 17 | 11 | 2 | 6 | 8 | 2 |
| 2012–13 | Missouri Mavericks | CHL | 48 | 12 | 22 | 34 | 37 | 13 | 1 | 10 | 11 | 4 |
| 2013–14 | Cornwall River Kings | LNAH | 26 | 12 | 10 | 22 | 8 | 2 | 0 | 0 | 0 | 2 |
| AHL totals | | | 304 | 62 | 68 | 130 | 215 | 7 | 2 | 1 | 3 | 0 |
| NHL totals | | | 8 | 0 | 2 | 2 | 2 | — | — | — | — | — |
