= Riley Weselowski =

Canadian ice hockey player

- Born: February 24, 1985 (age 40); Pilot Mound, Manitoba, Canada
- Height: 6 ft 0 in (183 cm)
- Weight: 192 lb (87 kg; 13 st 10 lb)
- Position: Defence
- Shot: Right
- Played for: Florida Everblades; Idaho Steelheads; Rapid City Rush; Cincinnati Cyclones; Wichita Thunder
- NHL draft: Undrafted
- Playing career: 2008–2021

Riley Weselowski (born February 24, 1985) is a Canadian former professional ice hockey defenceman who predominantly played in the ECHL. He is currently serving as the head coach of the Cincinnati Cyclones of the ECHL.

== Playing career ==
Weselowski made his professional debut with the Idaho Steelheads of the ECHL. In 2009, during his second season, he moved to Rapid City Rush. After six seasons with the Rush in the Central Hockey League and ECHL, Weselowski left the club as a free agent and signed a one-year contract with the Cincinnati Cyclones on September 17, 2015.

After spending the 2015–16 season with the Cyclones, he returned to Rapid City on July 27, 2016, extending his record as the longest tenured player in club history .

During his 11th professional year in the 2018–19 season, Weselowski left the Rush for a second time, after he was traded to the league leading Florida Everblades at the trade deadline on March 7, 2019.

During the 2019–20 season, Weselowski joined the Wichita Thunder and served as the team's captain.

== Coaching career ==
In June 2025, Weselowski was announced as the new head coach of the Cincinnati Cyclones.

== Awards and honours ==
Honours	Year
All-CHL Team (First Team All-Star)	2011–12
CHL Most Outstanding Defenceman	2011–12
CHL Man of the Year	2011–12
