= Frankie DeAngelis =

Canadian ice hockey player

- Born: February 15, 1985 (age 41) Woodbridge, Ontario, Canada
- Height: 5 ft 10 in (178 cm)
- Weight: 185 lb (84 kg; 13 st 3 lb)
- Position: Defence
- Shoots: Left
- CHL team Former teams: Fort Wayne Komets; Vaughan Vipers Georgetown Raiders
- NHL draft: Undrafted
- Playing career: 2009–present

Frankie DeAngelis (born February 15, 1985) is a former Canadian professional ice hockey defenceman for the Fort Wayne Komets of the East Coast Hockey League. He is currently the assistant coach of the OJHL North York Rangers.

== Hockey life ==
Frankie started playing hockey in his hometown of Vaughan, Ontario. In his first year on the ice playing Pee-Wee, Frankie scored five goals in one game. In his early years he played for the Vaughan Kings AAA Ice Hockey club of the GTHL.

=== Junior Hockey ===
Frankie was recruited by the Vaughan Vipers of the OPJHL in 2001. He played defense for the team until the end of the 2002-03 season when he was picked up by the Georgetown Raiders. With Frankie's assistance on the blue line the team finished first overall in the 2003–04 and 2004-05 seasons, winning the championship and hosting the Dudley Hewitt Cup in 2005. With the departure of team captain and fan favorite Vince Laise in 2005-06, Frankie was named team captain. That year he finished with a career high 48 points and 69 penalty minutes. Unfortunately that year the team lost to the Hamilton Red Wings (now Toronto Royals) in the Western Conference Semi-Finals.

Frankie was known to visit Pita Pit after a successful home game where he would celebrate his success with the Chicken Crave.

=== Atlantic Hockey League ===
Frankie played for American International College from the 2006-07 season until the 2008-09 season.

=== Professional Hockey career ===
In 2009-10 Frankie signed his first professional contract with the Fort Wayne Komets of the IHL and CHL (defunct). In his first season with the team, Frankie helped the Komets to their second consecutive Turner Cup. Quickly becoming a fan favorite, Frankie's play had him move up to the first d-pairing. In the 2011-12 season, Frankie reached his professional career high in goals (18), assists (28), and points (46). His 14 points in the 2011-12 playoffs helped the Komets defeat the Wichita Thunder 4 games to 1 for the team's third Turner cup in 4 years.

Frankie's father, Lou, was known to travel from southern Ontario, Canada to Fort Wayne, Indiana each home game to cheer on his son and the team. He was with Frankie in the post-game dressing room celebrations after the Komets lifted the Turner Cup in 2012.

Frankie retired from professional hockey after the 2011-12 season.

=== Coaching career ===
Frankie is now the assistant coach for the North York Rangers of the Ontario Junior Hockey League (OJHL), near his hometown of Vaughan, Ontario. In 2017-18, with Frankie's coaching services, the Rangers lost to Frankie's former team, the Georgetown Raiders, in Conference Semi-Finals.

Frankie was selected to the coaching staff for the GTHL AAA All-Star Game.

== Hockey Stats ==
Season	Team	Lge	GP	G	A	Pts	PIM	+/-	GP	G	A	Pts	PIM
2001-02	Vaughan Vipers	OPJHL	13	0	0	0	0						
2002-03	Vaughan Vipers	OPJHL	27	2	4	6	4						
2003-04	Georgetown Raiders	OPJHL	39	7	24	31	25						
2004-05	Georgetown Raiders	OPJHL	49	11	27	38	28						
2005-06	Georgetown Raiders	OPJHL	49	13	35	48	69						
2006-07	American International College	AHA	34	3	8	11	12						
2007-08	American International College	AHA	36	4	10	14	18						
2008-09	American International College	AHA	35	3	7	10	34						
2009-10	Fort Wayne Komets	IHL	73	9	32	41	22	31	12	0	3	3	6
2010-11	Fort Wayne Komets	CHL	54	11	33	44	46	11	8	1	9	10	6
2011-12	Fort Wayne Komets	CHL	66	18	28	46	32	12	18	4	10	14	8

== Awards and honors ==
Honours	Year
All-CHL Team (First Team All-Star)	2011–12
