= Shawn Limpright =

Canadian ice hockey player

- Born: July 6, 1981 (age 43); St. Adolphe, Manitoba, Canada
- Height: 5 ft 11 in (180 cm)
- Weight: 185 lb (84 kg; 13 st 3 lb)
- Position: Left wing
- Shot: Left
- CHL team Former teams: Arizona Sundogs; AHL; Syracuse Crunch; ECHL; Roanoke Express; Dayton Bombers; Las Vegas Wranglers; CHL; Bossier-Shreveport Mudbugs; Rapid City Rush; EIHL; Sheffield Steelers; Superisligaen; Esbjerg Energy
- NHL draft: Undrafted
- Playing career: 2002–2014

Shawn Limpright (born July 6, 1981) is a Canadian retired professional ice hockey player. He last played with the Arizona Sundogs of the Central Hockey League (CHL).

Limpright played major junior hockey in the Western Hockey League with the Moose Jaw Warriors.

== Awards and honours ==
Award	Year
Ray Miron President's Cup - CHL Championship with Bossier-Shreveport Mudbugs	2010–11
All-CHL Team (First Team All-Star)	2011–12
