= Vernon Cooper =

Welsh rugby player (born 1977)

- Born: June 12, 1977 (age 49) Swansea, Wales
- Height: 2.00 m (6 ft 7 in)
- Weight: 118 kg (18 st 8 lb)
- School: Maesydderwen School

Rugby union career
- Position: Lock
- Current team: retired
Senior career
Years	Team	Apps	(Points)
- Ystradgynlais
1997–2003	Llanelli RFC		
- Correct as of 11 July 2014
Provincial / State sides
Years	Team	Apps	(Points)
2003–2011	Scarlets	369	(45)
International career
Years	Team	Apps	(Points)
2002–2003	Wales	3	(0)
- Correct as of 11 July 2014

Vernon Cooper (born 12 June 1977) is a former Welsh rugby union footballer, who played for the Scarlets in the Celtic League. Cooper has also played for Wales. His usual position was at lock.

== Playing career ==
Cooper represented Wales at a number of national levels, including Under-18, Under-19 and Under-21, as well as playing for the Wales 'A' team. He was promoted to the senior national team in 2002. He made his senior debut for Wales on 16 November 2002, playing against Canada at the Millennium Stadium; Wales won 32–21.

The following season, he was again included in Wales' squad for the Tests in August. He came on as a replacement against Ireland at Lansdowne Road, which Ireland won 35–12. He played in the following match against Scotland in Cardiff, which Wales won 23–9.

During the 2008–09 season, he started coaching the Llanelli RFC forwards on a part-time basis, and was also used as an emergency back-row player.

In June 2011, Cooper announced his retirement from rugby due to a knee injury. He is currently the Scarlets' set piece coach.
