= Brandon Marino =

American ice hockey player

- Born: June 4, 1986 (age 39); Riverside, California, USA
- Height: 5 ft 9 in (175 cm)
- Weight: 185 lb (84 kg; 13 st 3 lb)
- Position: Forward
- Shot: Right
- Played for: Norfolk Admirals; Alba Volán Székesfehérvár; Utica Comets
- NHL draft: Undrafted
- Playing career: 2009–2019

Brandon Marino (born June 4, 1986) is an American former professional ice hockey forward. He last played with the Brampton Beast in the ECHL.

== Playing career ==
Undrafted, Marino played collegiate hockey with Bemidji State University in the College Hockey America conference. Marino is also a former Central Hockey League MVP, winning the award for his stellar 2011–12 season. He was selected to the All-ECHL First Team from leading the league in scoring with 30 goals and 88 points in 72 games in the 2013–14 season with the Fort Wayne Komets of the ECHL.

Marino opted to sign his first contract abroad, agreeing to a one-year deal with Hungarian club, Alba Volán Székesfehérvár of the EBEL on May 19, 2014. In the 2014–15 season, Marino played amongst Székesfehérvár top offensive line, placing third in team scoring with 39 points in 50 games.

On August 20, 2015, Marino returned to North America as a free agent, signing a one-year ECHL contract with the Brampton Beast. Selected as captain of the Beast for the 2015–16 season, Marino continued his dominance of the ECHL in contributing with 41 points in 40 games. Marino split the season in earning a loan to the AHL with the Utica Comets and appearing in 30 games for 4 goals.

On May 22, 2016, Marino opted to return to Europe in agreeing to a one-year contract with Slovakian second division club, HK FTC Nové Zámky of the Slovak 1.Liga. After training with FTC, Marino mutually agreed for a release of his contract in order to continue his tenure as Captain with the Brampton Beast on June 29, 2016.

== Awards and honors ==
Honors	Year
All-CHL Team (First Team All-Star)	2011–12
Central Hockey League MVP	2011–12
All-ECHL First Team	2013–14
