= Port Huron Icehawks =

- City: Port Huron, Michigan
- League: International Hockey League
- Founded: 2007
- Home arena: McMorran Arena
- Colors: Red, black
- Owner(s): Larry Kinney
- General manager: Stan Drulia
- Head coach: Stan Drulia
- Affiliates: West Michigan Blizzard, AAHL (lower)

Franchise history
- 2007–2010: Port Huron Icehawks

The Port Huron Icehawks were a minor professional ice hockey team based in Port Huron, Michigan. They were a member of the International Hockey League and played their home games at McMorran Arena from 2007 to 2010.

== History ==
The franchise was announced on June 20, 2007, as part of the new International Hockey League (IHL), a rebrand of the United Hockey League. The Icehawks were owned by Larry Kinney, owner and CEO of Datapak Services Corporation of Howell, Michigan.

The Icehawks were coached by Stan Drulia, a right winger whose professional career spanned 13 years from 1989 to 2001, and included three seasons with the Tampa Bay Lightning of the National Hockey League. After one year directing the hockey operations and head coaching duties with the defunct Port Huron Flags, Drulia returned to the area as both the head coach and general manager of the Icehawks. He remained with the Icehawks for all three of their seasons.

During their inaugural season, Drulia led the Icehawks to the Turner Cup Finals and a triple overtime loss to the Fort Wayne Komets in game seven. The Icehawks went 41–29–2–4 for the 2007–08 regular season and 7–5 in the playoffs, defeating the Flint Generals in the first round in five games. In the 2008–09 season, Drulia directed the Icehawks to another second place regular season finish in the IHL with a record of 44–21–6–5 and 99 points. For his efforts, he was named IHL Coach of the Year. Despite their strong season, the Icehawks struggled in the playoffs and were eliminated by the Muskegon Lumberjacks in the first round in six games. The Icehawks were also named IHL Franchise of the Year in the 2008–09 campaign, based on efforts both on and off the ice.

Drulia resigned after three seasons on May 5, 2010. On June 16, 2010, the Icehawks ceased operations due to financial losses. The IHL also folded one month later.

== Season-by-season results ==
Legend: GP= Games Played, W= Wins, L= Losses, OTL= Overtime losses, SOL= Shootout losses, Pts= Points, GF= Goals For, GA= Goals Against

| Season | GP | W | L | OTL | SOL | Pts | GF | GA | Standing | Playoffs |
|---|---|---|---|---|---|---|---|---|---|---|
| 2007–08 | 76 | 41 | 29 | 2 | 4 | 88 | 242 | 230 | 2nd, League | Lost in finals |
| 2008–09 | 76 | 44 | 21 | 6 | 5 | 99 | 262 | 201 | 2nd, League | Lost in first round |
| 2009–10 | 76 | 47 | 25 | 0 | 4 | 98 | 259 | 223 | 3rd, League | Lost in first round |
| Totals | 228 | 132 | 75 | 8 | 13 | 285 | 763 | 654 | | |
