= Nick Boucher =

Canadian ice hockey player (born 1980)

- Born: December 29, 1980 (age 45) Leduc, Alberta, Canada
- Height: 5 ft 11 in (180 cm)
- Weight: 175 lb (79 kg; 12 st 7 lb)
- Position: Goaltender
- Caught: Left
- Played for: Basingstoke Bison; Elmira Jackals; Muskegon Lumberjacks; Pee Dee Pride; Sydney Bears; Tilburg Trappers; Wheeling Nailers; Wilkes-Barre/Scranton Penguins; Fort Wayne Komets
- NHL draft: 280th overall, 2000; Pittsburgh Penguins
- Playing career: 2003–2012

Nick Boucher (born December 29, 1980) is a Canadian former professional ice hockey goaltender who played for the Fort Wayne Komets of the CHL.

== Playing career ==
Boucher started his career playing for the Cowichan Valley Capitals of the BCHL in 1997. Midway through the 1998-99 BCHL season, Boucher was traded to the Fort Saskatchewan Traders of the AJHL.

Boucher would later commit to Dartmouth College, where he became the starting goaltender. Although Boucher would only win 8 games in his freshman season, the Pittsburgh Penguins made him their final pick of the 2000 NHL Entry Draft, choosing him 280th overall. Boucher's totals would improve in his remaining years with Dartmouth, winning 16, 9, and 17 games respectively. He would leave Dartmouth holding several records, including, but not limited to, career wins (50), career games by a goalie (105), career saves, and wins in a season.

Signing to play with the Penguins farm team, Boucher would start his professional career with the Wheeling Nailers, the ECHL affiliate of the Pittsburgh Penguins, with a late season recall to Pittsburgh's primary minor league affiliate, the Wilkes-Barre Scranton Penguins of the AHL. Boucher would record 20 wins in his rookie season and was named to the ECHL All-Rookie Team. He finished 4th in the ECHL Rookie of the Year voting. Due to the 2004–05 NHL lockout, many pros that would normally have played in the NHL chose to play in the AHL, forcing pros in the AHL down to the ECHL. As a result, Boucher was left out of the Penguins plans, and he became an unrestricted free agent

Boucher would remain in the minors for several years, playing in Pee Dee (Florence, SC), Elmira and Muskegon before traveling to Europe. Boucher would split his 2006–07 season between the Basingstoke Bison of the EIHL and the Tilburg Trappers of the Eredivisie in the Netherlands, where he won his first championship. He would return to North America for the 2007-08 IHL season as a member of the Fort Wayne Komets. Except an 18-game stint with the Sydney Bears of the Australian Ice Hockey League, Boucher has remained with the team, being named the team's MVP in the 2008-2009 and 2011–2012 seasons, the IHL's Goalie Of the Year and First Team All Star in 2008–09, as well as runner-up for the league MVP (winner was Todd Robinson). He has since won 4 championships with the Komets (3 in the IHL and 1 in the CHL).

In his second CHL season with the Komets, he was named the starting goalie for the CHL All Star Game held in Prescott, Arizona, and was named a finalist for goaltender of the year.

In May 2013, Boucher retired from professional hockey. On October 26, 2013, the Fort Wayne Komets permanently retired Boucher's number "33", along with the number "1" of Chuck Adamson, in a pre-game ceremony at the Allen County War Memorial. He is the youngest former Komet player to have his jersey number retired.

== Awards ==
- 2003-2004: ECHL All-Rookie Team
- 2006-2007: Eredivisie Champion
- 2007-2008: IHL Champion
- 2008-2009: IHL Champion
- 2008-2009: IHL First All-Star Team
- 2008-2009: IHL Goaltender of the Year
- 2009-2010: IHL Champion
- 2011-2012: CHL All Star game Starting Goalie
- 2011-2012: CHL Champion

== Records ==
- 1999-2003: Dartmouth College, career saves (2,803)
- 1999-2003: Dartmouth College, career wins (50)
- 2000-2001: Dartmouth College, single season saves (867)
