= Bloomington Thunder (SPHL) =

- City: Bloomington, Illinois
- League: Central Hockey League (2011–2013); Southern Professional Hockey League (2013–2014)
- Operated: 2011–2014
- Home arena: U.S. Cellular Coliseum
- Colors: Purple, Black, Silver, White
- Owners: Illinois Pro Sports, LLC
- Head coach: Greg Pankewicz
- Captain: Travis Granbois
- Media: WJBC-FM (93.7 FM)

Franchise history
- 2011–2013: Bloomington Blaze (CHL)
- 2013–2014: Bloomington Thunder (SPHL)

The Bloomington Thunder were a minor professional ice hockey team that was a member of the Southern Professional Hockey League. Based in Bloomington, Illinois, the Thunder played their home games at the U.S. Cellular Coliseum (now the Grossinger Motors Arena), located in downtown Bloomington. After two years in the Central Hockey League as the Bloomington Blaze, the Thunder played under new ownership and in the Southern Professional Hockey League in the 2013–14 season.

Although the Blaze played at the U.S. Cellular Coliseum, they were not a continuation of the former Bloomington PrairieThunder franchise, who failed to reach an operating agreement with the Coliseum and folded on July 3, 2011. Their first season, the Blaze were coached by Paul Gardner.

On May 15, 2013, it was announced that the Thunder, along with a new Peoria Rivermen team, would join the Southern Professional Hockey League for the 2013–14 season. The Peoria Rivermen of the AHL had been notified that the Vancouver Canucks, who had purchased the team a month earlier, would not keep them in Peoria. The two teams will reportedly be owned by two former Rivermen executives, John Butler, Bart Rogers and David Holt with financial backing from former Rivermen owner Bruce Saurs.

In 2012–13, the Bloomington Blaze were coached by former Dayton Gems coach Brian Gratz. The Gems went a combined 55–58–19 in his tenure there from 2010 to 2012. After 12 games into the 2013–14 SPHL season with a 3–9–0 record, Gratz was fired.

The Bloomington Blaze organization also included a junior hockey team with membership to the Midwest Junior Hockey League (MWJHL) that began play in the 2012–13 season. In April 2014, the professional team folded and was replaced by the junior Tier I Bloomington Thunder of the United States Hockey League. Five months later, the MWJHL junior team was relocated to become the Decatur Blaze and currently plays in the United States Premier Hockey League Midwest Division.

== See also ==
- Bloomington PrairieThunder
