= 2011–12 CHL season =

- League: Central Hockey League
- Sport: Ice hockey
- Teams: 14

Regular season
- Governor's Cup: Wichita Thunder
- Season MVP: Brandon Marino (Fort Wayne)
- Top scorer: Todd Robinson (Evansville)

Finals
- Champions: Fort Wayne Komets
- Runners-up: Wichita Thunder

CHL seasons
- 2010–11 2012–13

The 2011–12 CHL season was the 20th season of the Central Hockey League (CHL).

== League business ==
=== Team changes ===
The Bossier-Shreveport Mudbugs, Colorado Eagles (who moved to the ECHL), Mississippi RiverKings (who moved to the Southern Professional Hockey League), Bloomington PrairieThunder, and the Odessa Jackalopes all left the league.

A new team, the Bloomington Blaze joined the league and will play in the Turner Conference.

=== Realignment ===
Announced on June 14, 2011, the league realigned their conferences with the loss of five teams and the addition of one team. The notable changes are the addition of Bloomington to the Turner Conference and Wichita Thunder to the Berry Conference.

== Teams ==
2011-12 Central Hockey League
Conference	Team	City	Arena
Turner	Bloomington Blaze	Bloomington, Illinois	U.S. Cellular Coliseum
Turner	Dayton Gems	Dayton, Ohio	Hara Arena
Turner	Evansville Icemen	Evansville, Indiana	Ford Center
Turner	Fort Wayne Komets	Fort Wayne, Indiana	Allen County War Memorial Coliseum
Turner	Missouri Mavericks	Independence, Missouri	Independence Events Center
Turner	Quad City Mallards	Moline, Illinois	iWireless Center
Turner	Rapid City Rush	Rapid City, South Dakota	Rushmore Plaza Civic Center
Berry	Allen Americans	Allen, Texas	Allen Event Center
Berry	Arizona Sundogs	Prescott Valley, Arizona	Tim's Toyota Center
Berry	Laredo Bucks	Laredo, Texas	Laredo Entertainment Center
Berry	Rio Grande Valley Killer Bees	Hidalgo, Texas	State Farm Arena
Berry	Texas Brahmas	North Richland Hills, Texas	NYTEX Sports Centre
Berry	Tulsa Oilers	Tulsa, Oklahoma	BOK Center
Berry	Wichita Thunder	Wichita, Kansas	Intrust Bank Arena

== Map of teams ==
Turner Conference Berry Conference

== Regular season ==
=== Conference standings ===
Updated May 12, 2012.

Turner Conference	GP	W	L	OTL	GF	GA	Pts
Fort Wayne Komets	66	40	19	7	228	187	87
Evansville IceMen	66	40	22	4	215	192	84
Missouri Mavericks	66	39	21	6	223	200	84
Rapid City Rush	66	38	22	6	226	176	82
Quad City Mallards	66	37	27	2	230	201	76
Dayton Gems	66	23	29	14	185	228	60
Bloomington Blaze	66	24	35	7	183	244	55

Updated March 26, 2012.

Berry Conference	GP	W	L	OTL	GF	GA	Pts
Wichita Thunder	66	44	19	3	231	181	91
Allen Americans	66	39	18	9	212	175	87
Texas Brahmas	66	33	25	8	171	170	74
Rio Grande Valley Killer Bees	66	32	27	7	208	200	71
Tulsa Oilers	66	29	29	8	207	222	66
Laredo Bucks	66	25	38	3	175	246	53
Arizona Sundogs	66	19	38	9	175	247	47

== Playoffs ==
=== Playoff bracket ===
Conference Semi-Finals
T1	Fort Wayne	4
T4	Rapid City	2
Turner Conference
T2	Evansville	0
T3	Missouri	4
B1	Wichita	4
B4	Rio Grande Valley	1
Berry Conference
B2	Allen	2
B3	Texas	4

Conference Final
T1	Fort Wayne	4
T3	Missouri	3
B1	Wichita	4
B3	Texas	2

Ray Miron Presidents' Cup Finals
T1	Fort Wayne	4
B1	Wichita	1

== CHL Awards ==
Source:Central Hockey League Historical Award Winners

Ray Miron President's Cup:	Fort Wayne Komets
Bud Poile Governors' Cup:	Wichita Thunder
Most Valuable Player:	Brandon Marino (Quad City)
Most Outstanding Goaltender:	Mark Guggenberger (Texas)
Most Outstanding Defenseman:	Riley Weselowski (Rapid City)
Rookie of the Year:	Mark Guggenberger (Texas)
Coach of the Year:	Kevin McClelland (Wichita Thunder)
Man of the Year:	Riley Weselowski (Rapid City)
Rick Kozuback Award (Sportsmanship/Perseverance):	TBD
Joe Burton Award (Scoring Champion):	Todd Robinson (Evansville)
Playoff Most Valuable Player:	Mike Vaskivuo (Fort Wayne)
All-Star Game Most Valuable Player (Arizona):	Kevin Petovello
All-Star Game Most Valuable Player (CHL All-Stars):	Brandon Marino (Quad City)
Athletic Trainer of the Year:	Bryan Rogers (Dayton)
Equipment Manager of the Year:	Romeo Vivit (Rapid City)

=== All-CHL Team ===
Source:CHL Media Relations

- Shawn Limpright, Forward, Rapid City Rush
- Brandon Marino, Forward, Quad City Mallards
- Todd Robinson, Forward, Evansville IceMen
- Frankie DeAngelis, Defense, Fort Wayne Komets
- Riley Weselowski, Defense, Rapid City Rush
- Mark Guggenberger, Goal, Texas Brahmas
