= 2007–08 IHL season =

- Finals champions: Fort Wayne Komets

Seasons
- ← 2006–07 2008–09 →

The 2007–08 International Hockey League season was the 17th season of the International Hockey League (known as the Colonial Hockey League before 1997 and the United Hockey League before 2007), a North American minor professional league. Six teams participated in the regular season, and the Fort Wayne Komets won the league title.

== Regular season ==
	GP	W	L	OTL	SOL	GF	GA	Pts
Fort Wayne Komets	76	56	12	6	2	280	186	120
Port Huron Icehawks	76	41	29	2	4	242	230	88
Flint Generals	76	34	28	5	9	271	276	82
Muskegon Fury	76	35	35	4	2	220	263	76
Kalamazoo Wings	76	31	34	5	6	242	252	73
Bloomington PrairieThunder	76	31	38	3	4	210	258	69

== Turner Cup-Playoffs ==
Turner Cup-Semifinals
1	Fort Wayne Komets	4
4	Muskegon Fury	2
2	Port Huron Icehawks	4
3	Flint Generals	1

Turner Cup-Final
1	Fort Wayne Komets	4
2	Port Huron Icehawks	3
