= 2008–09 IHL season =

- Finals champions: Fort Wayne Komets

Seasons
- ← 2007–08 2009–10 →

The 2008–09 International Hockey League season was the 18th season of the International Hockey League (Colonial Hockey League before 1997, United Hockey League before 2007), a North American minor professional league. Six teams participated in the regular season and the Fort Wayne Komets won the league title.

== Regular season ==
	GP	W	L	OTL	SOL	GF	GA	Pts
Fort Wayne Komets	76	46	18	3	9	288	213	104
Port Huron Icehawks	76	44	21	6	5	262	201	99
Muskegon Lumberjacks	76	43	26	3	4	315	298	93
Kalamazoo Wings	76	44	29	2	1	274	253	91
Bloomington PrairieThunder	76	29	40	2	5	235	291	65
Flint Generals	76	22	47	2	5	241	359	51

== Turner Cup-Playoffs ==
Turner Cup-Semifinals
1	Fort Wayne Komets	4
4	Kalamazoo Wings	2
2	Port Huron Icehawks	2
3	Muskegon Lumberjacks	4

Turner Cup-Final
1	Fort Wayne Komets	4
3	Muskegon Lumberjacks	1
