= 2009–10 IHL season =

- Finals champions: Fort Wayne Komets

Seasons
- ← 2008–09

The 2009–10 International Hockey League season was the 19th and last season of the International Hockey League (Colonial Hockey League before 1997, United Hockey League before 2007), a North American minor professional league. Seven teams participated in the regular season and the Fort Wayne Komets won the league title.

== Regular season ==
	GP	W	L	OTL	SOL	GF	GA	Pts
Muskegon Lumberjacks	76	51	20	1	4	282	218	107
Fort Wayne Komets	76	50	21	1	4	263	183	105
Port Huron Icehawks	76	47	25	0	4	259	223	98
Flint Generals	76	33	36	3	4	232	257	73
Bloomington PrairieThunder	76	31	34	5	6	241	273	73
Quad City Mallards	76	29	35	4	8	207	263	70
Dayton Gems	76	25	46	4	1	200	267	55

== Turner Cup-Playoffs ==
Turner Cup-Semifinals
2	Fort Wayne Komets	4
3	Port Huron Icehawks	3
1	Muskegon Lumberjacks	3
4	Flint Generals	4

Turner Cup-Final
2	Fort Wayne Komets	4
4	Flint Generals	1
