= 2010–11 Wichita Thunder season =

2010–11 Wichita Thunder
- Conference: Turner
- 2010–11 record: 34-26-6
- Home record: 20-9-4
- Road record: 14-17-2
- Goals for: 249
- Goals against: 231

Team information
- General manager: Joel Lomurno
- Coach: Kevin McClelland
- Assistant coach: Jason Duda
- Captain: Daniel Tetrault
- Alternate captains: Lance Galbraith; Andrew Martens
- Arena: Intrust Bank Arena
- Average attendance: 5,342

Team leaders
- Goals: Matt Robinson (39)
- Assists: Aaron Davis (46)
- Points: Jesse Bennefield (75)
- Penalty minutes: Robin Richards (189)
- Plus/minus: Jesse Bennefield (+19)
- Wins: Marc-Antonie Gelinas (25)
- Goals against average: Marc-Antonie Gelinas (2.90)

The 2010–11 Wichita Thunder season was the 19th season of the CHL franchise in Wichita, Kansas.

== Off-season ==
On April 27, 2010, the Wichita Thunder announced that they hired Kevin McClelland as the new head coach and they also announced that Jason Duda would be the new assistant coach. The Thunder overhauled their roster with only three players returning, Ian Keserich, Jason Woll, and Bobby Hughes.

== Regular season ==
=== Conference standings ===
Turner Conference	GP	W	L	OTL	GF	GA	Pts
y-Rapid City Rush	66	40	22	4	210	200	84
x-Colorado Eagles	66	40	22	4	250	199	84
x-Bloomington PrairieThunder	66	37	22	7	188	189	81
x-Missouri Mavericks	66	37	23	6	213	173	80
x-Wichita Thunder	66	34	26	6	249	231	74
x-Fort Wayne Komets	66	31	27	8	187	204	70
x-Quad City Mallards	66	34	31	1	186	182	69
x-Dayton Gems	66	32	29	5	201	200	69
Evansville IceMen	66	21	32	13	181	242	55

x – Qualified for playoffs; y – Won division; z – Won regular season league title After games of March 27, 2011

== Schedule and results ==
=== Pre-season ===
2010 Pre-season Game Log: 1-1-0 (Home: 1-0-0; Road: 0-1-0)
#	Date	Visitor	Score	Home	OT	Decision	Record
1	October 8	Tulsa	6 – 7	Wichita ^{1}		Mark Sibbald	1–0–0
2	October 9	Wichita	3 – 8	Tulsa ^{2}		Marty Magers	1–1–0
Match played at Wichita Ice Center in Wichita, Kansas.; Match played at Oilers Ice Center in Tulsa, Oklahoma.

=== Regular season ===
2010–11 Game Log

October: 3-4-0 (Home: 2-2-0; Road: 1-2-0)
#	Date	Visitor	Score	Home	OT	Decision	Attendance	Record	Pts
1	October 15	Wichita Thunder	3 – 4	Tulsa Oilers		Ian Keserich	5,826	0–1–0	0
2	October 16	Tulsa Oilers	4 – 1	Wichita Thunder		Ian Keserich	7,110	0–2–0	0
3	October 22	Wichita Thunder	1 – 2	Missouri Mavericks		Marty Magers	5,317	0-3-0	0
4	October 23	Allen Americans	5 – 3	Wichita Thunder		Ian Keserich	4,044	0-4-0	0
5	October 29	Rio Grande Valley Killer Bees	4 – 3	Wichita Thunder		Marty Magers	4,019	1-4-0	2
6	October 30	Tulsa Oilers	2 – 4	Wichita Thunder		Marty Magers	4,244	2-4-0	4
7	October 31	Wichita Thunder	8 – 0	Tulsa Oilers		Marc-Antoine Gelinas	3,284	3-4-0	6

November: 4-3-2 (Home: 3-0-2; Road: 1-3-0)
#	Date	Visitor	Score	Home	OT	Decision	Attendance	Record	Pts
8	November 5	Arizona Sundogs	2 – 4	Wichita Thunder		Marc-Antoine Gelinas	4,307	4-4-0	8
9	November 6	Wichita Thunder	4 – 3	Missouri Mavericks	OT	Marty Magers	5,409	5-4-0	10
10	November 12	Missouri Mavericks	2 – 3	Wichita Thunder		Marc-Antoine Gelinas	4,685	6-4-0	12
11	November 13	Bloomington PrairieThunder	3 – 2	Wichita Thunder	SO	Peter Delmas	4,811	6-4-1	13
12	November 18	Wichita Thunder	2 – 6	Odessa Jackalopes		Peter Delmas	2,203	6-5-1	13
13	November 19	Wichita Thunder	1 – 4	Allen Americans		Marc-Antonie Gelinas	4,126	6-6-1	13
14	November 24	Mississippi RiverKings	3 – 2	Wichita Thunder	SO	Marc-Antonie Gelinas	3,817	6-6-2	14
15	November 26	Wichita Thunder	5 – 7	Colorado Eagles		Marty Magers	5,289	6-7-2	14
16	November 27	Colorado Eagles	3 – 5	Wichita Thunder		Marc-Antonie Gelinas	5,011	7-7-2	16

December: 7-6-0 (Home: 4-3-0; Road: 3-3-0)
#	Date	Visitor	Score	Home	OT	Decision	Attendance	Record	Pts
17	December 1	Rapid City Rush	3 – 8	Wichita Thunder		Marc-Antonie Gelinas	6,107	8-7-2	18
18	December 3	Colorado Eagles	4 – 5	Wichita Thunder		Marc-Antonie Gelinas	4,039	9-7-2	20
19	December 4	Wichita Thunder	0 – 5	Mississippi RiverKings		Peter Delmas	2,445	9-8-2	20
20	December 10	Fort Wayne Komets	1 – 5	Wichita Thunder		Marc-Antonie Gelinas	4,182	10-8-2	22
21	December 11	Tulsa Oilers	7 – 4	Wichita Thunder		Marc-Antonie Gelinas	5,098	10-9-2	22
22	December 14	Wichita Thunder	7 – 6	Tulsa Oilers		Marc-Antonie Gelinas	3,800	11-9-2	24
23	December 17	Tulsa Oilers	5 – 3	Wichita Thunder		Marc-Antonie Gelinas	5,333	11-10-2	24
24	December 18	Wichita Thunder	4 – 5	Bloomington PrairieThunder		Peter Delmas	2,365	11-11-2	24
25	December 25	Wichita Thunder	5 – 6	Tulsa Oilers		Marc-Antoine Gelinas	5,049	11-12-2	24
26	December 26	Missouri Mavericks	4 – 7	Wichita Thunder		Marc-Antoine Gelinas	3,871	12-12-2	26
27	December 27	Missouri Mavericks	2 – 0	Wichita Thunder		Marc-Antoine Gelinas	4,577	12-13-2	26
28	December 29	Wichita Thunder	2 – 0	Quad City Mallards		Marc-Antoine Gelinas	2,645	13-13-2	28
29	December 31	Wichita Thunder	4 – 1	Rapid City Rush		Marc-Antoine Gelinas	5,119	14-13-2	30

January: 9-2-1 (Home: 5-1-1; Road: 4-1-0)
#	Date	Visitor	Score	Home	OT	Decision	Attendance	Record	Pts
30	January 1	Wichita Thunder	4 – 7	Rapid City Rush		Marty Magers	4,823	14-14-2	30
31	January 7	Missouri Mavericks	4 – 6	Wichita Thunder		Marc-Antoine Gelinas	4,011	15-14-2	32
32	January 8	Bloomington PrairieThunder	1 – 5	Wichita Thunder		Marc-Antoine Gelinas	5,002	16-14-2	34
33	January 14	Texas Brahmas	4 – 3	Wichita Thunder		Marc-Antoine Gelinas	4,444	16-15-2	34
34	January 15	Arizona Sundogs	3 – 6	Wichita Thunder		Marc-Antoine Gelinas	4,889	17-15-2	36
35	January 17	Wichita Thunder	3 – 2	Quad City Mallards		Marty Magers	1,304	18-15-2	38
36	January 21	Wichita Thunder	4 – 3	Missouri Mavericks	SO	Marc-Antoine Gelinas	5,800	19-15-2	40
37	January 22	Missouri Mavericks	0 – 4	Wichita Thunder		Marc-Antoine Gelinas	7,481	20-15-2	42
38	January 23	Laredo Bucks	3 – 6	Wichita Thunder		Marty Magers	9,477	21-15-2	44
39	January 25	Rapid City Rush	4 – 3	Wichita Thunder	SO	Marc-Antoine Gelinas	3,211	21-15-3	45
40	January 28	Wichita Thunder	5 – 3	Dayton Gems		Marc-Antoine Gelinas	2,722	22-15-3	47
41	January 30	Wichita Thunder	4 – 3	Dayton Gems		Marc-Antoine Gelinas	1,510	23-15-3	49

February: 3-5-3 (Home: 2-2-1; Road: 1-3-2)
#	Date	Visitor	Score	Home	OT	Decision	Attendance	Record	Pts
42	February 4	Wichita Thunder	4 – 5	Fort Wayne Komets	SO	Marc-Antoine Gelinas	6,966	23-15-4	50
43	February 5	Wichita Thunder	4 – 5	Fort Wayne Komets		Marty Magers	10,011	23-16-4	50
44	February 11	Rio Grande Valley Killer Bees	5 – 3	Wichita Thunder		Marc-Antoine Gelinas	10,114	23-17-4	50
45	February 12	Bloomington PrairieThunder	3 – 4	Wichita Thunder	OT	Kevin Beech	5,574	24-17-4	52
46	February 13	Wichita Thunder	1 – 4	Mississippi RiverKings		Marc-Antoine Gelinas	3,487	24-18-4	52
47	February 15	Wichita Thunder	3 – 0	Bossier-Shreveport Mudbugs		Marc-Antoine Gelinas	2,428	25-18-4	54
48	February 18	Mississippi RiverKings	2 – 5	Wichita Thunder		Marc-Antoine Gelinas	4,407	26-18-4	56
49	February 19	Tulsa Oilers	5 – 1	Wichita Thunder		Marc-Antoine Gelinas	8,558	26-19-4	56
50	February 21	Wichita Thunder	1 – 4	Texas Brahmas		Kevin Beech	1,977	26-20-4	56
51	February 23	Texas Brahmas	8 – 7	Wichita Thunder	OT	Marc-Antoine Gelinas	4,107	26-20-5	57
52	February 26	Wichita Thunder	4 – 5	Colorado Eagles	OT	Marc-Antoine Gelinas	26-20-6	5,289	58

March: 8-6-0 (Home: 4-1-0; Road: 4-5-0)
#	Date	Visitor	Score	Home	OT	Decision	Attendance	Record	Pts
53	March 1	Colorado Eagles	6 – 7	Wichita Thunder	SO	Marc-Antoine Gelinas	27-20-6	4,815	60
54	March 4	Wichita Thunder	3 – 2	Rapid City Rush		Kevin Beech	28-20-6	4,795	62
55	March 5	Wichita Thunder	1 – 2	Rapid City Rush		Marc-Antoine Gelinas	28-21-6	4,735	62
56	March 8	Wichita Thunder	3 – 2	Tulsa Oilers	OT	Marc-Antoine Gelinas	29-21-6	4,262	64
57	March 11	Mississippi RiverKings	2 – 5	Wichita Thunder		Marc-Antoine Gelinas	30-21-6	6,436	66
58	March 12	Wichita Thunder	1 – 4	Allen Americans		Marty Magers	30-22-6	4,654	66
59	March 13	Quad City Mallards	1 – 4	Wichita Thunder		Marc-Antoine Gelinas	31-22-6	7,832	68
60	March 17	Wichita Thunder	6 – 4	Quad City Mallards		Marc-Antoine Gelinas	32-22-6	2,185	70
61	March 18	Wichita Thunder	2 – 5	Missouri Mavericks		Kevin Beech	32-23-6	5,800	70
62	March 19	Wichita Thunder	5 – 3	Missouri Mavericks		Kevin Beech	33-23-6	5,800	72
63	March 22	Wichita Thunder	3 – 5	Missouri Mavericks		Marc-Antoine Gelinas	33-24-6	5,518	72
64	March 25	Tulsa Oilers	5 – 3	Wichita Thunder		Kevin Beech	5,666	33-25-6	72
65	March 26	Wichita Thunder	2 – 4	Tulsa Oilers		Marty Magers	8,523	33-26-6	72
66	March 27	Mississippi RiverKings	1 – 8	Wichita Thunder		Marty Magers	5,031	34-26-6	74

Legend: Win (2 points) Loss (0 points) Overtime/shootout loss (1 point)

== Playoffs ==
The Wichita Thunder qualified for the playoffs for the first time since 2007. They lost the opening round best-of-five series against the Missouri Mavericks 2 - 3.

== Awards and records ==
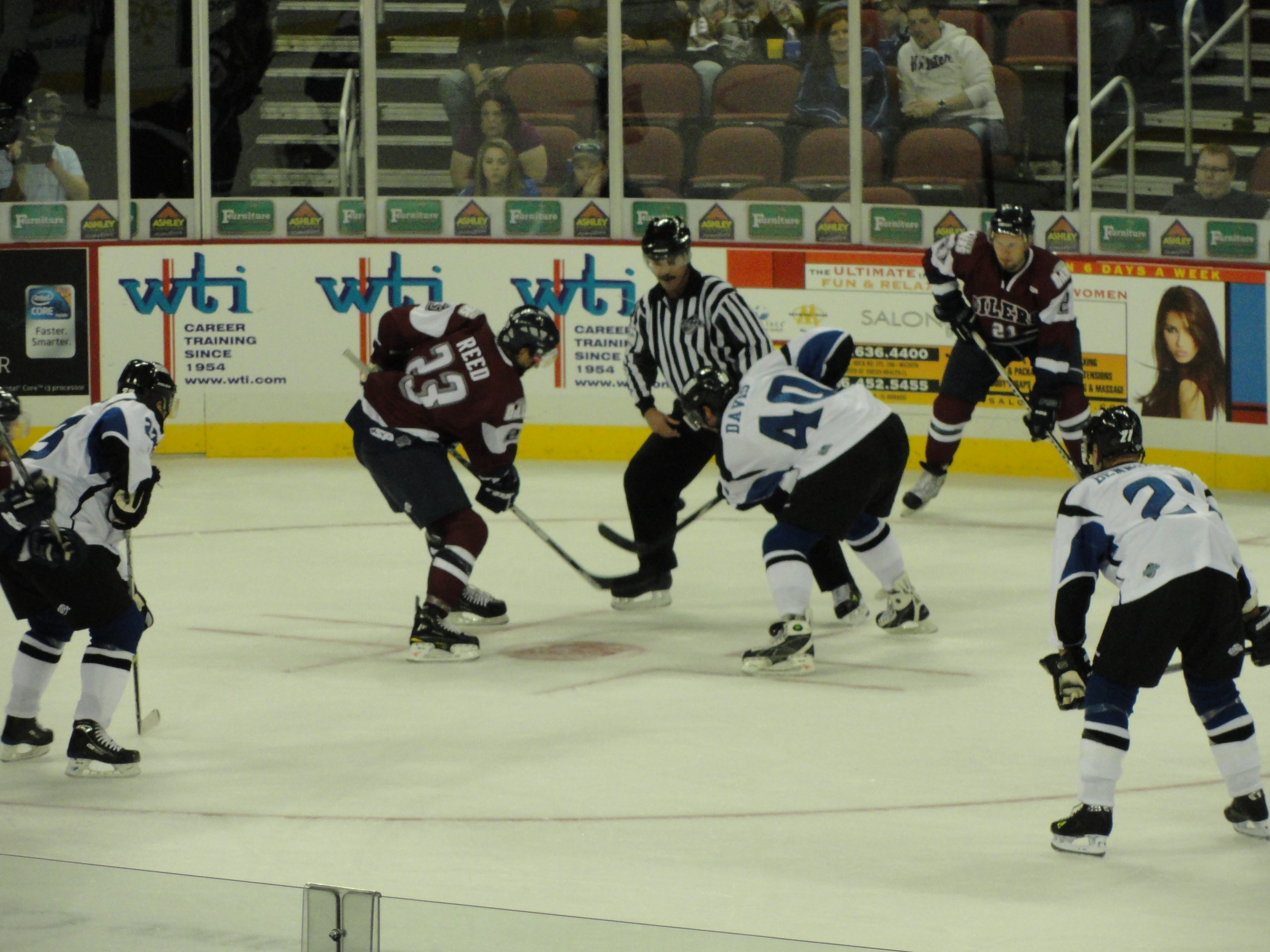
The Wichita Thunder playing the Tulsa Oilers on October 16, 2010.

=== Awards ===
Regular Season
Player	Award	Awarded
Steve Kaunisto	Oakley CHL Player of the Week	November 1, 2010
Matt Robinson	All-Star Game representative	December 29, 2010
A.J. Gale	Sher-Wood CHL Player of the Month (December)	January 6, 2011
Jesse Bennefield	Oakley CHL Player of the Week	January 24, 2011
Marc-Antoine Gelinas	Oakley CHL Goaltender of the Week	March 15, 2011

=== Milestones ===
Regular Season
Player	Milestone	Reached
Chris Moran	1st professional Assist; 1st professional Point	October 23, 2010
Chris Moran	1st professional Goal	October 31, 2010
Daniel Tetrault	100th professional Goal	December 10, 2010

== Transactions ==
The Thunder have been involved in the following transactions during the 2010–11 season.

Trades

September 1, 2010	To Rio Grande Valley Killer Bees: Tomas Klempa	To Wichita: Jesse Bennefield
September 9, 2010	To Laredo Bucks: Ryan Campbell	To Wichita: Eric Giosa
September 9, 2010	To Quad City Mallards: Jason Reese; Eric Giosa	To Wichita: Jason Goulet
November 8, 2010	To Laredo Bucks: Future Considerations	To Wichita: Matt Robinson
January 14, 2011	To Allen Americans: Future Considerations	To Wichita: Dustin Donaghy

Player signings

Player	Former team	Date
Andrew Martens	Ontario Reign	May 29, 2010
Kory Scoran	Tilburg Trappers	May 29, 2010
Daniel Tetrault	Port Huron Icehawks	July 16, 2010
Lance Galbraith	Utah Grizzlies	July 16, 2010
Aaron Davis	Tulsa Oilers	July 30, 2010
Matt Hubbauer	Sheffield Steelers	July 30, 2010
Ryan Hand	Reading Royals	August 12, 2010
Peter Stevens	Sarnia Sting	August 12, 2010
Chris Greene	Mississippi Surge	September 3, 2010
Brent Cullaton	Laredo Bucks	September 11, 2010
Chris Falloon	Rapid City Rush	September 11, 2010
Travis Wight	Nijmegen Devils	September 18, 2010
Marty Magers	Tulsa Oilers	September 28, 2010
A.J. Gale	Texas Brahmas	October 13, 2010
Chris Moran	Niagara University	October 20, 2010
Troy Schwab	Johnstown Chiefs	October 20, 2010
Steven Kaunisto	Reading Royals	October 20, 2010
Mike Looby	Laredo Bucks	November 5, 2010
Robin Richards	Toledo Walleye	November 27, 2010

Players re-signed

Player	Date
Ian Keserich	July 30, 2010
Jason Woll	September 3, 2010
Bobby Hughes	September 11, 2010

Lost via waivers

Player	Date
Jason Woll	October 19, 2010
Peter Stevens	October 25, 2010
Ian Keserich	November 4, 2010
Chris Falloon	November 9, 2010
Chris Moran	November 26, 2010
Ryan Hand	January 15, 2011

Player movement
Date	Player	From	To	Assignment
November 9, 2010	Peter Delmas	Hamilton Bulldogs	Wichita	Loaned by Hamilton
December 28, 2010	Peter Delmas	Wichita	Hamilton	Recalled by Hamilton

== Roster ==
No.	Nat	Player	Pos	S/G	Age	Acquired	Birthplace
21	(Canada)	Jesse Bennefield	RW	R	43	2010	Calgary, Alberta
23	(Canada)	Brent Cullaton	LW	L	50	2010	Petawawa, Ontario
40	(United States)	Aaron Davis	C	L	45	2010	Dearborn Heights, Michigan
18	(United States)	Dustin Donaghy	LW	L	35	2011	Cranbrook, British Columbia
71	(Canada)	Lance Galbraith (A)	RW	L	45	2010	Brampton, Ontario
22	(Canada)	A.J. Gale	LW	L	38	2010	Nanaimo, British Columbia
30	(Canada)	Marc-Antoine Gelinas	G	L	36	2010	Saint-Étienne-de-Lauzon, Quebec
29	(Canada)	Jason Goulet	D	L	42	2010	Winnipeg, Manitoba
19	(United States)	Chris Greene	C	R	39	2010	Massena, New York
10	(Canada)	Matt Hubbauer	C	L	42	2010	Winnipeg, Manitoba
91	(Canada)	Bobby Hughes	C	L	37	2010	Richmond Hill, Ontario
6	(United States)	Steven Kaunisto	D	L	38	2010	Sault Ste. Marie, Michigan
4	(Canada)	Mike Looby	D	L	40	2010	Brampton, Ontario
56	(United States)	Marty Magers	G	L	42	2010	Plainfield, Illinois
55	(Canada)	Andrew Martens (A)	D	L	43	2010	Calgary, Alberta
24	(Canada)	Robin Richards	LW	L	39	2010	Winnipeg, Manitoba
16	(Canada)	Matt Robinson	LW	L	39	2010	South Surrey, British Columbia
28	(Canada)	Troy Schwab	C	L	40	2010	Kindersley, Saskatchewan
5	(Canada)	Kory Scoran	D	L	43	2010	Winnipeg, Manitoba
7	(Canada)	Daniel Tetrault (C)	D	R	45	2010	La Broquerie, Manitoba
27	(Canada)	Travis Wight	D	L	42	2010	Fannystelle, Manitoba

== See also ==
- 2010–11 CHL season
