= 2010–11 Missouri Mavericks season =

2010–11 Missouri Mavericks
- Conference: 4th Turner
- 2010–11 record: 37-23-6
- Home record: 20-10-3
- Road record: 17-13-3
- Goals for: 213
- Goals against: 173

Team information
- General manager: Brent Thiessen
- Coach: Scott Hillman
- Captain: Carlyle Lewis
- Alternate captains: Ray DiLauro, Ryan Jardine
- Arena: Independence Events Center
- Average attendance: 5,406

Team leaders
- Goals: Mike Berry (27)
- Assists: Toby Lafrance, Nick Sirota (36)
- Points: Nick Sirota (61)
- Penalty minutes: Carlyle Lewis (205)
- Plus/minus: Blake Forsyth, Cole Ruwe (+26)
- Wins: Rob Nolan (26)
- Goals against average: Rob Nolan (2.07)

The 2010–11 Missouri Mavericks season was the second season of the Central Hockey League (CHL) franchise in Independence, Missouri.

== Regular season ==
=== Conference standings ===
Turner Conference	GP	W	L	OTL	GF	GA	Pts
y-Rapid City Rush	66	40	22	4	210	200	84
x-Colorado Eagles	66	40	22	4	250	199	84
x-Bloomington PrairieThunder	66	37	22	7	188	189	81
x-Missouri Mavericks	66	37	23	6	213	173	80
x-Wichita Thunder	66	34	26	6	249	231	74
x-Fort Wayne Komets	66	31	27	8	187	204	70
x-Quad City Mallards	66	34	31	1	186	182	69
x-Dayton Gems	66	32	29	5	201	200	69
Evansville IceMen	66	21	32	13	181	242	55

x – Qualified for playoffs; y – Won division; z – Won regular season league title After games of March 27, 2011

== Playoffs ==
In the playoffs, the Mavericks were eliminated in Game four by the Colorado Eagles in the best-of-five Turner Conference semi-finals.

=== 2010-2011 Missouri Mavericks Playoff Game Log ===
2011 Central Hockey League Ray Miron President's Cup Playoffs

Turner Conference Quarterfinals vs. #5 Wichita Thunder (Best-of-five series) (Home: 2–1; Road: 1–1)
#	Date	Opponent	Score	OT	Decision	Series
1	March 30	@ Wichita Thunder	2-1		Gelinas	0–1
2	April 1	Wichita Thunder	5-0		Nolan	1-1
3	April 2	Wichita Thunder	5-4	OT	Gelinas	1–2
4	April 5	@Wichita Thunder	2-1		Nolan	2-2
5	April 6	Wichita Thunder	5-4		Nolan	3–2

Turner Conference Semifinals vs. #2 Colorado Eagles (Best-of-five series) (Home: 1–1; Road: 0–2)
#	Date	Opponent	Score	OT	Decision	Series
1	April 15	@ Colorado Eagles	5-2		Penner	0-1
2	April 16	@ Colorado Eagles	5-1		Penner	0–2
3	April 19	Colorado Eagles	4-3		Nolan	1–2
4	April 21	Colorado Eagles	2-1		Jones	1–3

== Awards and records ==
=== Awards ===
Regular Season
Player	Award	Awarded
Scott Hillman (Head Coach)	Coach (2011 CHL All-Star Game)	December 23, 2010
Rob Nolan	Representative (2011 CHL All-Star Game)	December 29, 2010
Nick Sirota	Representative (2011 CHL All-Star Game)	December 31, 2010

=== Milestones ===
Regular Season
Player	Milestone	Reached

== Transactions ==
Trades

September 22, 2010	To Arizona Sundogs: Bobby Jarosz	To Missouri: Future Considerations
October 12, 2010	To Allen Americans: Chris Mifflen	To Missouri: David Nimmo
October 25, 2010	To Arizona Sundogs: Karl Sellan	To Missouri: Clayton Barthel, Sean Muncy
November 26, 2010	To Fort Wayne Komets: Tab Lardner	To Missouri: Future Considerations
December 6, 2010	To Tulsa Oilers: Braden Walls	To Missouri: Brennan Barker
January 16, 2011	To Rio Grande Valley Killer Bees: Dominic D'Amour	To Missouri: Sean Muncy
February 4, 2011	To Texas Brahmas: Sean Muncy	To Missouri: Todd Griffith, Steven Later

Player Signings

Player	Former team	Date	Signed/Re-Signed/Claimed off Waivers
Carlyle Lewis	Re-Signed	May 14, 2010	Re-Signed
Bill Vandermeer	Re-Signed	May 14, 2010	Re-Signed
Olivier Filion	Victoria Salmon Kings	May 14, 2010	Signed
Chris Mifflen	Re-Signed	May 24, 2010	Re-Signed
Toby Lafrance	Re-Signed	May 24, 2010	Re-Signed
Mike Wakita	Union College	May 24, 2010	Signed
Gerry Festa	Re-Signed	June 24, 2010	Re-Signed
Brett Hammond	Re-Signed	June 24, 2010	Re-Signed
Derek Pallardy	Re-Signed	June 24, 2010	Re-Signed
Simon Watson	Re-Signed	June 24, 2010	Re-Signed
Derek Knowles	The University of Guelph	June 24, 2010	Signed
Blake Forsyth	Re-Signed	August 16, 2010	Re-Signed
Cole Ruwe	Bloomington PrairieThunder	August 16, 2010	Signed
Karl Sellan	Re-Signed	August 16, 2010	Re-Signed
Jeff Broekema	Pickering Panthers	August 17, 2010	Signed
Matthew Brenton	Montreal Juniors	August 17, 2010	Signed
Marco Guercio	Southern Alberta Institute of Technology	August 17, 2010	Signed
Ryan Sparling	St. Francis Xavier University	August 17, 2010	Signed
Myles Stevens	Swan Valley Stampeders	August 17, 2010	Signed
Bobby Jarosz	Michigan State University	August 17, 2010	Signed
Nick Sirota	Re-Signed	August 25, 2010	Re-Signed
Jared Lavender	Re-Signed	August 25, 2010	Re-Signed
Dominic D'Amour	Nottingham Panthers	August 25, 2010	Signed
Rob Nolan	Flint Generals	August 25, 2010	Signed
Mike Berry	Newcastle Vipers	September 13, 2010	Signed
Ray DiLauro	Cleveland Barons	September 13, 2010	Signed
Tab Lardner	Port Huron Icehawks	September 15, 2010	Signed
Nathan O'Nabigon	Allen Americans	September 15, 2010	Signed
Zane Kalemba	Princeton University	September 22, 2010	Signed
Cody Straker	Swan Valley Stampeders	September 29, 2010	Signed
Robby Spalding	Odessa Jackalopes		Signed
Gentry Zollars	New York Aviators		Signed
Ryan Jardine	HC Interspar Bolzano-Bozen Foxes	September 30, 2010	Signed
Cole Ruwe	Re-Signed	October 16, 2010	Signed
Walker Wintoneak	Saskatoon Blades	October 27, 2010	Signed
Ryan McLeod	Rio Grande Valley Killer Bees	January 11, 2011	Claimed off Waivers
Shawn Fensel	Thousand Islands Privateers	January 26, 2011	Signed
Brandon Coccimiglio	Alaska Aces	February 10, 2011	Signed
Andrew Courtney	University of Lethbridge Pronghorns	March 10, 2011	Signed
Vern Cooper	Sault Ste. Marie Greyhounds	March 30, 2011	Signed

Waived/Retired/Placements on Team Suspension

Player	Date	Free Agency Loss (New Team)/Waived (New Team)/Placed on Team Suspension (New Team)/Retired
Mike McGurk		Free Agent (The University of British Columbia)
Tom Maldonado	July 23, 2010	Free Agent (Eaters Geleen)
Charlie Effinger	August 5, 2010	Free Agent (Newcastle Vipers)
Jordan Foreman	August 11, 2010	Free Agent (Stockton Thunder)
Mike Burgoyne	August 30, 2010	Free Agent (HYS The Hague)
Jeff Christian	September 10, 2010	Free Agent (Mississippi RiverKings)
Braden Walls		Free Agent (Bakersfield Condors)
Matthew Brenton	October 11, 2010	Waived (The University of Prince Edward Island)
Jeff Broekema	October 11, 2010	Waived (1000 Islands Privateers)
Marco Guercio	October 11, 2010	Waived
Myles Stevens	October 11, 2010	Waived (Sagkeeng Braves)
Robby Spalding	October 11, 2010	Waived (Knoxville Ice Bears)
Cody Straker	October 11, 2010	Waived (Columbus Cottonmouths)
Gentry Zollars	October 11, 2010	Waived (Louisiana IceGators)
Cole Ruwe	October 15, 2010	Waived (Missouri Mavericks)
Brett Hammond	October 15, 2010	Waived (Columbus Cottonmouths)
Zane Kalemba	October 27, 2010	Waived (Elmira Jackals)
Ryan Sparling	November 1, 2010	Waived (Corner Brook Royals)
Ryan McLeod	January 12, 2011	Waived (Bloomington PrairieThunder)
Olivier Filion	January 16, 2011	Placed on Team Suspension (Saguenay Marquis)
Walker Wintoneak	December 23, 2010	Placed on Team Suspension (The University of Calgary)
Bill Vandermeer	February 23, 2011	Waived

== 2010–2011 Missouri Mavericks roster (all active-roster players during the season and post-season) ==
#	Nat	Name	Pos	Cap/Alt	S/G	Height	Weight	Birthdate	Birthplace	Regular-season GP	Playoff GP
10	(Canada)	Mike Berry	RW		R	5 ft 11 in (1.80 m)	180 lb (82 kg)	28 June 1983	Kanata, Ontario	66	9
17	(Canada)	Brandon Coccimiglio	F		L	6 ft 2 in (1.88 m)	210 lb (95 kg)	19 July 1987	Burlington, Ontario	20	9
15	(Canada)	Vern Cooper	F		L	5 ft 9 in (1.75 m)	202 lb (92 kg)	30 December 1990	Sudbury, Ontario	0	3
28	(Canada)	Andrew Courtney	F		R	6 ft 3 in (1.91 m)	200 lb (91 kg)	8 June 1985	Belleville, Ontario	7	0
55	(Canada)	Dominic D'Amour	D		L	6 ft 3 in (1.91 m)	214 lb (97 kg)	28 January 1984	Lasalle, Quebec	33	0
3	(United States)	Ray DiLauro	D	A	L	6 ft 2 in (1.88 m)	229 lb (104 kg)	13 July 1979	Bensalem, Pennsylvania	65	9
7	(Canada)	Shawn Fensel	D		R	5 ft 9 in (1.75 m)	200 lb (91 kg)	13 November 1986	Nepean, Ontario	23	8
34	(Canada)	Gerry Festa	G		R	5 ft 10 in (1.78 m)	175 lb (79 kg)	18 January 1984	Calgary, Alberta	25	1
13	(Canada)	Blake Forsyth	D		L	6 ft 3 in (1.91 m)	191 lb (87 kg)	4 September 1979	Winnipeg, Manitoba	66	9
64	(Canada)	Olivier Filion	C	A	L	5 ft 10 in (1.78 m)	195 lb (88 kg)	3 October 1982	Montreal, Quebec	32	0
11	(Canada)	Todd Griffith	F		L	5 ft 11 in (1.80 m)	181 lb (82 kg)	27 January 1985	Welland, Ontario	24	7
21	(Canada)	Ryan Jardine	LW	A	L	6 ft 0 in (1.83 m)	193 lb (88 kg)	15 March 1980	Ottawa, Ontario	66	9
32	(United States)	Zane Kalemba	G		L	5 ft 10 in (1.78 m)	171 lb (78 kg)	19 December 1985	Saddle Brook, New Jersey	1	0
19	(Canada)	Derek Knowles	LW		L	6 ft 3 in (1.91 m)	205 lb (93 kg)	6 April 1985	Vanderhoof, British Columbia	38	2
9	(Canada)	Toby Lafrance	C		R	5 ft 9 in (1.75 m)	189 lb (86 kg)	17 June 1987	Granby, Quebec	63	9
23	(Canada)	Tab Lardner	F		L	5 ft 11 in (1.80 m)	175 lb (79 kg)	3 December 1979	Edmonton, Alberta	15	0
4	(Canada)	Steven Later	D		R	6 ft 4 in (1.93 m)	200 lb (91 kg)	12 September 1984	Winnipeg, Manitoba	18	9
6	(United States)	Jared Lavender	D		R	5 ft 11 in (1.80 m)	188 lb (85 kg)	30 March 1984	Cleveland Heights, Ohio	45	7
24	(Canada)	Carlyle Lewis	RW, EN	C	R	6 ft 3 in (1.91 m)	234 lb (106 kg)	1 March 1978	Middleton, Nova Scotia	66	9
11	(United States)	Sean Muncy	F		L	6 ft 0 in (1.83 m)	193 lb (88 kg)	11 January 1983	Chesterfield, Missouri	6	0
47	(Canada)	Rob Nolan	G		L	5 ft 10 in (1.78 m)	190 lb (86 kg)	10 December 1985	Sherwood Park, Alberta	44	9
44	(Canada)	Nathan O'Nabigon	LW		L	6 ft 2 in (1.88 m)	195 lb (88 kg)	3 May 1983	Longlac, Ontario	48	9
20	(United States)	Derek Pallardy	D		L	5 ft 10 in (1.78 m)	175 lb (79 kg)	6 July 1983	Chesterfield, Missouri	57	9
2	(United States)	Cole Ruwe	D		R	6 ft 2 in (1.88 m)	205 lb (93 kg)	2 April 1985	Pekin, Illinois	64	9
28	(Canada)	Karl Sellan	F		L	5 ft 11 in (1.80 m)	200 lb (91 kg)	4 April 1985	Montreal, Quebec	2	0
37	(United States)	Nick Sirota	RW		R	5 ft 11 in (1.80 m)	190 lb (86 kg)	28 January 1984	Fox Lake, Wisconsin	66	9
4	(Canada)	Ryan Sparling	RW		L	5 ft 11 in (1.80 m)	186 lb (84 kg)	23 July 1988	Sydney, Nova Scotia	6	0
16	(Canada)	Bill Vandermeer	C		R	5 ft 11 in (1.80 m)	180 lb (82 kg)	3 May 1984	Caroline, Alberta	26	0
8	(Canada)	Mike Wakita	D		L	6 ft 2 in (1.88 m)	215 lb (98 kg)	28 May 1985	Kitimat, British Columbia	59	0
18	(Canada)	Simon Watson	RW		R	6 ft 0 in (1.83 m)	182 lb (83 kg)	3 April 1980	Waterloo, Ontario	48	9
28	(Canada)	Walker Wintoneak	F		R	6 ft 3 in (1.91 m)	208 lb (94 kg)	25 July 1989	Flin Flon, Manitoba	20	0

== See also ==
- 2010–11 CHL season
