= 2010–11 Colorado Eagles season =

Eight seasons of the CHL franchise in Loveland, Colorado

2010–11 Colorado Eagles
- Conference: Turner
- 2010–11 record: 40-22-4
- Home record: 20-11-2
- Road record: 20-11-2
- Goals for: 250
- Goals against: 199

Team information
- Coach: Chris Stewart
- Assistant coach: Greg Pankewicz
- Captain: Riley Nelson
- Arena: Budweiser Events Center
- Average attendance: 5,289

Team leaders
- Goals: Kevin Ulanski (35)
- Assists: Kevin Ulanski (61)
- Points: Kevin Ulanski (96)
- Penalty minutes: Joe Grimaldi (171)
- Plus/minus: Riley Nelson (+40)
- Wins: Kyle Jones (29)
- Goals against average: Kyle Jones (2.62)

The 2010–11 Colorado Eagles season was the eighth season of the CHL franchise in Loveland, Colorado.

== Regular season ==
=== Conference standings ===
Turner Conference	GP	W	L	OTL	GF	GA	Pts
y-Rapid City Rush	66	40	22	4	210	200	84
x-Colorado Eagles	66	40	22	4	250	199	84
x-Bloomington PrairieThunder	66	37	22	7	188	189	81
x-Missouri Mavericks	66	37	23	6	213	173	80
x-Wichita Thunder	66	34	26	6	249	231	74
x-Fort Wayne Komets	66	31	27	8	187	204	70
x-Quad City Mallards	66	34	31	1	186	182	69
x-Dayton Gems	66	32	29	5	201	200	69
Evansville IceMen	66	21	32	13	181	242	55

x – Qualified for playoffs; y – Won division; z – Won regular season league title After games of March 27, 2011

== Playoffs ==
=== Playoff Bracket ===
Conference Opening Round	Conference Semi-Final
1	Rapid City	3
8	Dayton	0
1	Rapid City	3
6	Fort Wayne	2
3	Bloomington	0
6	Fort Wayne	3
Turner Conference
2	Colorado	3
7	Quad City	1
3	Colorado	3
4	Missouri	1
4	Missouri	3
5	Wichita	2
1	Allen	3
8	Rio Grande Valley	0
1	Allen	3
5	Odessa	2
4	Texas	1
5	Odessa	3
Berry Conference
2	Bossier-Shreveport	3
7	Arizona	1
2	Bossier-Shreveport	3
3	Tulsa	2
3	Tulsa	3
6	Mississippi	2

Conference Final
1	Rapid City	3
2	Colorado	4
1	Allen	1
2	Bossier-Shreveport	4

Ray Miron Presidents' Cup Finals
T2	Colorado	3
B2	Bossier-Shreveport	4

== Awards and records ==
=== Awards ===
Regular season
Player	Award	Awarded
Scott May	Oakley CHL Player of the Week	October 25, 2010
Riley Nelson	Sher-Wood CHL Player of the Month (October)	November 3, 2010
Scott May	CHL Oakley First Star of the Month (October)	November 5, 2010
Kyle Jones	Sher-Wood CHL Goaltender of the Month (November)	December 3, 2010
Adam Chorneyko	CHL All-Rookie Team	March 18, 2011

== Final roster ==
No.	Nat	Player	Pos	S/G	Age	Acquired	Birthplace	Contract
20	(Canada)	Jason Beatty	D	L	42	2007	Sturgis, Saskatchewan	Eagles
67	(Canada)	Adam Chorneyko	F	L	37	2010	St. Albert, Alberta	Eagles
11	(Canada)	Matt Glasser	F	L	38	2010	Calgary, Alberta	Eagles
7	(United States)	Joe Grimaldi	D	R	39	2010	Ronkonkoma, New York	Eagles
10	(Canada)	Steve Haddon	LW	L	41	2006	Sarnia, Ontario	Eagles
44	(Canada)	Matt Hanson	D	L	42	2010	Midway, British Columbia	Eagles
28	(United States)	A.J. Hau	F		39	2010	Fort Collins, Colorado	Eagles
19	(Canada)	Adam Hogg	C	L	42	2008	Conestogo, Ontario	Eagles
29	(Canada)	Kyle Jones	G	L	42	2010	North Delta, British Columbia	Eagles
47	(Canada)	Scott May	F	R	43	2010	White Rock, British Columbia	Eagles
12	(Canada)	Riley Nelson	C		47	2003	Cranbrook, British Columbia	Eagles
31	(Canada)	Andrew Penner	G	R	42	2008	Simcoe, Ontario	Eagles
55	(Canada)	Kyle Peto	D	L	43	2010	Lethbridge, Alberta	Eagles
14	(Canada)	Daymen Rycroft	F		46	2010	Beaverlodge, Alberta	Eagles
23	(Canada)	Aaron Schneekloth	D		47	2006	Calgary, Alberta	Eagles
51	(Canada)	Dylan Stanley	F	R	41	2010	Edmonton, Alberta	Eagles
82	(Canada)	Dan Sullivan	F	R	44	2010	York, Ontario	Eagles
5	(Canada)	Brett Thurston	D	L	43	2009	Strathmore, Alberta	Eagles
9	(United States)	Kevin Ulanski	RW	L	43	2008	Madison, Wisconsin	Eagles
2	(Canada)	Kip Workman	D	R	41	2010	Brandon, Manitoba	Eagles

== See also ==
- 2010–11 CHL season
