= 2010–11 Evansville IceMen season =

American ice hockey club season

2010–11 Evansville IceMen
- Conference: 9th Turner
- 2010–11 record: 21-32-13
- Home record: 11-13-6
- Road record: 10-19-7
- Goals for: 181
- Goals against: 242

Team information
- Coach: Rich Kromm
- Captain: Jeff Nelson
- Alternate captains: Jordan Little; Mario Larocque
- Arena: Swonder Ice Arena
- Average attendance: 1,329

Team leaders
- Goals: Brian Bicek (27)
- Assists: Nicklas Lindberg (54)
- Points: Nicklas Lindberg (69)
- Penalty minutes: Mark Cody (161)
- Plus/minus: Jeff Christian (+5)
- Wins: Matt Lundin (16)
- Goals against average: Matt Lundin (3.34)

The 2010–11 Evansville IceMen season was the first season in the Central Hockey League of the CHL franchise in Evansville, Indiana.

== Off-season ==
During the off-season it was announced that the Evansville IceMen was to participate in the Central Hockey League for the upcoming season.

== Regular season ==
=== Conference standings ===
Turner Conference	GP	W	L	OTL	GF	GA	Pts
y-Rapid City Rush	66	40	22	4	210	200	84
x-Colorado Eagles	66	40	22	4	250	199	84
x-Bloomington PrairieThunder	66	37	22	7	188	189	81
x-Missouri Mavericks	66	37	23	6	213	173	80
x-Wichita Thunder	66	34	26	6	249	231	74
x-Fort Wayne Komets	66	31	27	8	187	204	70
x-Quad City Mallards	66	34	31	1	186	182	69
x-Dayton Gems	66	32	29	5	201	200	69
Evansville IceMen	66	21	32	13	181	242	55

x – Qualified for playoffs; y – Won division; z – Won regular season league title After games of March 27, 2011

== Awards and records ==
=== Awards ===
Regular Season
Player	Award	Awarded
Matt Lundin	Oakley CHL Goaltender of the Week	November 16, 2010

== Transactions ==
The IceMen have been involved in the following transactions during the 2010–11 season.

Trades
January 4, 2011	To Texas Brahmas: Future Considerations	To Evansville: Matt Pierce; Jeff Harvey
February 7, 2011	To Bloomington PrairieThunder: Tom Galvin	To Evansville: Jamie Lovall
February 7, 2011	To Dayton Gems: Damian Surma	To Evansville: Erik Boisvert

== Roster ==
Updated March 17, 2011.

No.	Nat	Player	Pos	S/G	Age	Acquired	Birthplace	Contract
10	(United States)	Brian Bicek	F	L	40	2009	Downers Grove, Illinois	IceMen
16	(Canada)	Jesse Biduke	F	L	38	2010	Whitby, Ontario	IceMen
7	(Canada)	George Bradley	D	R	42	2010	Burlington, Ontario	IceMen
13	(England)	Bo Cheesman	RW	R	45	2010	Guildford, England	IceMen
72	(Canada)	Jeff Christian	F	L	56	2011	Burlington, Ontario	IceMen
18	(Canada)	Mark Cody	LW		44	2009	Halifax, Nova Scotia	IceMen
16	(Canada)	Braden Desmet	F	L	41	2010	Strathmore, Alberta	IceMen
17	(United States)	John DiPace	RW	R	44	2008	Clinton Township, Michigan	IceMen
27	(Canada)	Andrew Gibbons	RW	R	40	2010	Oshawa, Ontario	IceMen
33	(Canada)	Jeff Harvey	G		43	2011	St. Albert, Alberta	IceMen
19	(Russia)	Anton Kharin	F	L	41	2010	Moscow, Russia	IceMen
54	(Canada)	Jordan Lane	F	L	37	2010	Whitehorse, Yukon	IceMen
71	(Canada)	Mario Larocque (A)	D	L	48	2009	Montreal, Quebec	IceMen
25	(Sweden)	Nicklas Lindberg	C	L	46	2010	Stockholm, Sweden	IceMen
8	(Canada)	Jordan Little (A)	D		45	2009	Winnipeg, Manitoba	IceMen
31	(United States)	Matt Lundin	G		40	2009	Apple Valley, Minnesota	IceMen
9	(Canada)	Jeff Nelson (C)	F	L	53	2010	Prince Albert, Saskatchewan	IceMen
22	(United States)	Nick Schneider	D		41	2009	Maplewood, Minnesota	IceMen
37	(Canada)	Lee Zalasky	F	R	42	2010	Lloydminster, Alberta	IceMen

== See also ==
- 2010–11 CHL season
