= 2010–11 Bloomington PrairieThunder season =

2010–11 Bloomington PrairieThunder
- League: 4th CHL
- Conference: 3rd Turner
- 2010–11 record: 37-22-7
- Home record: 20-10-3
- Road record: 17-12-4
- Goals for: 188
- Goals against: 189

Team information
- General manager: Jim Riggs
- Coach: Jason Christie
- Captain: Jason Deleume
- Alternate captains: John Snowden; Craig MacDonald
- Arena: U.S. Cellular Coliseum
- Average attendance: 2,603

Team leaders
- Goals: Brett Holmberg (23)
- Assists: Jason Dale (35)
- Points: Jason Dale (52)
- Penalty minutes: Travis Granbois (131)
- Plus/minus: Garrett Klotz (+21)
- Wins: Marco Emond (25)
- Goals against average: Marco Emond (2.89)

The 2010–11 Bloomington PrairieThunder season was the first season in the Central Hockey League of the CHL franchise in Bloomington, Illinois.

== Off-season ==
On August 10, 2010, it was announced that head coach Jarrod Skalde resigned to pursue other coaching opportunities. On August 25, 2010, they announced that Jason Christie would be the new head coach.

== Regular season ==
=== Conference standings ===
Turner Conference	GP	W	L	OTL	GF	GA	Pts
y-Rapid City Rush	66	40	22	4	210	200	84
x-Colorado Eagles	66	40	22	4	250	199	84
x-Bloomington PrairieThunder	66	37	22	7	188	189	81
x-Missouri Mavericks	66	37	23	6	213	173	80
x-Wichita Thunder	66	34	26	6	249	231	74
x-Fort Wayne Komets	66	31	27	8	187	204	70
x-Quad City Mallards	66	34	31	1	186	182	69
x-Dayton Gems	66	32	29	5	201	200	69
Evansville IceMen	66	21	32	13	181	242	55

x – Qualified for playoffs; y – Won division; z – Won regular season league title After games of March 27, 2011

== Awards and records ==
=== Awards ===
Regular Season
Player	Award	Awarded
Marco Emond	Oakley CHL Goaltender of the Week	October 26, 2010
Alan Mazur	CHL All-Rookie Team	March 18, 2011

=== Milestones ===
Regular Season
Player	Milestone	Reached

== Transactions ==
The PrairieThunder have been involved in the following transactions during the 2010–11 season.

Trades

December 2, 2010	To Odessa Jackalopes: Justin Sawyer	To Bloomington: Pierre-Olivier Beaulieu; David Brown

Player signings

Player	Former team
Shaun Arvai	Amarillo Gorillas
Marco Emond	Bisons de Neuilly-sur-Marne
Jamie Lovell	Port Huron Icehawks
Jason Dale	Bakersfield Condors
Matt McIlvane	Peoria Rivermen
Dustin DeGagne	The College of St. Scholastica
Brad Phillips	University of Notre Dame

Players re-signed

Player	Date
John Snowden	June 17, 2010
Jon Booras	July 22, 2010
Craig Macdonald	July 22, 2010
Brett Holmberg	August 12, 2010
Matt Woodard	September 15, 2010
Brent Clarke	September 15, 2010

Lost via waivers

Player	Date
Rick Varone	October 19, 2010
Shaun Arvai	October 19, 2010
Matt Woodard	October 19, 2010
Kevin Armstrong	October 25, 2010
David Brown	February 9, 2011
Jeff MacPhee	February 9, 2011

== Roster ==
Updated February 9, 2011.

No.	Nat	Player	Pos	S/G	Age	Acquired	Birthplace	Contract
24	(United States)	Bill Bagron	C	L	42	2008	Eagle River, Alaska	PrairieThunder
5	(Canada)	Billy Bezeau	D	R	38	2011	Miscou, New Brunswick	PrairieThunder
27	(United States)	Jon Booras	F	L	42	2009	Billings, Montana	PrairieThunder
11	(Canada)	Chris Cloud	LW	L	36	2010	Waywayseecappo, Manitoba	PrairieThunder
17	(Canada)	Jason Dale	RW	R	36	2010	Pickering, Ontario	PrairieThunder
10	(United States)	Aaron Dawson	D	L	39	2010	Peoria, Illinois	PrairieThunder
18	(Canada)	Dustin DeGagne	D	R	39	2010	Winnipeg, Manitoba	PrairieThunder
9	(Canada)	Jason Deleurme (C)	RW	R	48	2010	Kelowna, British Columbia	PrairieThunder
1	(Canada)	Marco Emond	G	L	47	2010	Valleyfield, Quebec	PrairieThunder
4	(United States)	Tom Galvin	D	L	45	2011	Staten Island, New York	PrairieThunder
12	(Canada)	Travis Granbois	F	R	39	2010	Tahsis, British Columbia	PrairieThunder
19	(Canada)	Brett Holmberg	RW	R	39	2007	Sherwood Park, Alberta	PrairieThunder
33	(Canada)	Garrett Klotz	LW	L	36	2010	Regina, Saskatchewan	Flyers
20	(Canada)	Jeff MacPhee	D	L	40	2011	Calgary, Alberta	PrairieThunder
6	(Canada)	Alan Mazur	D	L	39	2010	Burnaby, British Columbia	PrairieThunder
32	(Canada)	Ryan McLeod	C	R	40	2010	Fernie, British Columbia	PrairieThunder
35	(United States)	Brad Phillips	G	L	35	2010	Farmington Hills, Michigan	PrairieThunder
44	(United States)	Bill Pinel	D	R	37	2010	Third Lake, Illinois	PrairieThunder
25	(United States)	Keith Rodger	D	R	40	2011	Parshall, Colorado	PrairieThunder
16	(Canada)	Brodie Sheahan	RW	R	38	2010	Lethbridge, Alberta	PrairieThunder
22	(United States)	John Snowden	RW	R	43	2009	Everett, Washington	PrairieThunder
7	(United States)	Jason Williams	RW	R	39	2011	Plattsburgh, New York	PrairieThunder

== See also ==
- 2010–11 CHL season
