= 2010–11 Dayton Gems season =

2010–11 Dayton Gems (2009–2012)
- Conference: Turner
- 2010–11 record: 32-29-5
- Home record: 20-11-2
- Road record: 12-18-3
- Goals for: 201
- Goals against: 200

Team information
- Coach: Brian Gratz
- Captain: Greg Labenski
- Arena: Hara Arena
- Average attendance: 1,877

Team leaders
- Goals: Mike Vaskivuo (26)
- Assists: Mike Vaskivuo (34)
- Points: Mike Vaskivuo (60)
- Penalty minutes: Kyle Bochek (139)
- Plus/minus: Chris Lipsett (+14)
- Wins: Jeff Jakaitis (22)
- Goals against average: Jeff Jakaitis (2.58)

The 2010–11 Dayton Gems season was the first season in the Central Hockey League of the CHL franchise in Dayton, Ohio.

== Off-season ==
During the 2010-11 off-season it was announced that the Dayton Gems would move to the Central Hockey League along with the rest of the International Hockey League.

== Regular season ==
=== Conference standings ===
Turner Conference	GP	W	L	OTL	GF	GA	Pts
y-Rapid City Rush	66	40	22	4	210	200	84
x-Colorado Eagles	66	40	22	4	250	199	84
x-Bloomington PrairieThunder	66	37	22	7	188	189	81
x-Missouri Mavericks	66	37	23	6	213	173	80
x-Wichita Thunder	66	34	26	6	249	231	74
x-Fort Wayne Komets	66	31	27	8	187	204	70
x-Quad City Mallards	66	34	31	1	186	182	69
x-Dayton Gems	66	32	29	5	201	200	69
Evansville IceMen	66	21	32	13	181	242	55

x – Qualified for playoffs; y – Won division; z – Won regular season league title After games of March 27, 2011

== Awards and records ==
=== Awards ===
Regular Season
Player	Award	Awarded
Jeff Jakaitis	Oakley CHL Goaltender of the Week	December 21, 2010

== Roster ==
No.	Nat	Player	Pos	S/G	Age	Acquired	Birthplace	Contract
21	(Canada)	Kyle Bochek	C	L	36	2010	Port Severn, Ontario	Gems
12	(Canada)	Erik Boisvert	LW	L	38	2010	Drummondville, Quebec	Gems
29	(United States)	Tom Boudreau	C	R		2010	Oak Lawn, Illinois	Gems
14	(United States)	Nick Canzanello	D	L	38	2010	Rochester, Minnesota	Gems
15	(United States)	Corey Couturier	LW	R	40	2009	Traverse City, Michigan	Gems
22	(United States)	Tysen Dowzak	D	L	36	2010	Fergus Falls, Minnesota	Rangers
23	(Canada)	Paul Ferraro	D	R	38	2010	Pleasantville, New York	Gems
10	(United States)	Tim Hartung	F	R	40	2009	Apple Valley, Minnesota	Gems
27	(Canada)	Greg Labenski (C)	D	L	46	2009	Welland, Ontario	Gems
11	(United States)	Matthew Larke	RW	R	37	2009	Oxford, Michigan	Gems
72	(Canada)	Chris Lipsett	RW	R	50	2009	Brandon, Manitoba	Gems
19	(Canada)	Brett Lutes	LW	L	43	2010	Riverview, New Brunswick	Gems
41	(United States)	Derek MacIntyre	G	L	39	2009	Stanwood, Michigan	Gems
32	(Canada)	Matthew McCue	D	L	36	2010	Cochrane, Alberta	Rangers
56	(Canada)	Matt Miller	F	R	41	2010	Sioux Lookout, Ontario	Gems
24	(United States)	Brandon Naurato	LW	L	40	2010	Livonia, Michigan	Gems
42	(Canada)	Nathan Oke	D	L	39	2009	Fenelon Falls, Ontario	Gems
30	(Canada)	Jon Olthuis	G	L	39	2011	Neerlandia, Alberta	Gems
9	(Canada)	Jonathan Ornelas	F	L	38	2009	Mississauga, Ontario	Gems
8	(United States)	Nathan Schwartzbauer	D	R	42	2010	Wasilla, Alaska	Gems
7	(Canada)	Ernie Stewart	C	L	39	2010	Salmon Arm, British Columbia	Gems
15	(United States)	Damian Surma	C		44	2011	Lincoln Park, Michigan	Gems
26	(United States)	Matt Szypura	D	R	40	2010	Warrenville, Illinois	Gems
25	(Finland)	Mike Vaskivuo	F	L	38	2009	Helsinki, Finland	Gems

== See also ==
- 2010–11 CHL season
