= Joe Grimaldi =

Joe Grimaldi may refer to:

- Joseph Grimaldi (1778–1837), English comic theatre star, especially in the harlequinade
- Joe Grimaldi (ice hockey) (born 1986), American ice hockey defenceman
- Joe Grimaldi, Canadian sound engineer who has been nominated for and won the Canadian Screen Award for Best Sound Mixing
