= 2010–11 Rapid City Rush season =

2010–11 Rapid City Rush
- League: 2nd Central Hockey League
- Conference: 1st Turner
- 2010–11 record: 40-22-4
- Home record: 20-11-2
- Road record: 20-11-2
- Goals for: 210
- Goals against: 200

Team information
- General manager: Tim Hill
- Coach: Joe Ferras
- Assistant coach: Mark DeSantis
- Captain: Scott Wray
- Alternate captains: Riley Weselowski; Colt King; Brendon Hodge
- Arena: Rushmore Plaza Civic Center
- Average attendance: 4,923

Team leaders
- Goals: Ryan Menei (39)
- Assists: Ryan Menei (48)
- Points: Ryan Menei (87)
- Penalty minutes: Kevin Harvey (194)
- Plus/minus: Ryan Menei (+25)
- Wins: Danny Battochio (30)
- Goals against average: Danny Battochio (2.61)

The 2010–11 Rapid City Rush season was the third season of the CHL franchise in Rapid City, South Dakota.

== Regular season ==
=== Conference standings ===
Turner Conference	GP	W	L	OTL	GF	GA	Pts
y-Rapid City Rush	66	40	22	4	210	200	84
x-Colorado Eagles	66	40	22	4	250	199	84
x-Bloomington PrairieThunder	66	37	22	7	188	189	81
x-Missouri Mavericks	66	37	23	6	213	173	80
x-Wichita Thunder	66	34	26	6	249	231	74
x-Fort Wayne Komets	66	31	27	8	187	204	70
x-Quad City Mallards	66	34	31	1	186	182	69
x-Dayton Gems	66	32	29	5	201	200	69
Evansville IceMen	66	21	32	13	181	242	55

x – Qualified for playoffs; y – Won division; z – Won regular season league title After games of March 27, 2011

== Awards and records ==
=== Awards ===
Regular Season
Player	Award	Awarded
Derek LeBlanc	Oakley CHL Player of the Week	November 15, 2010

=== Milestones ===
Regular Season
Player	Milestone	Reached

== See also ==
- 2010–11 CHL season
