= Todd Griffith =

Canadian ice hockey player

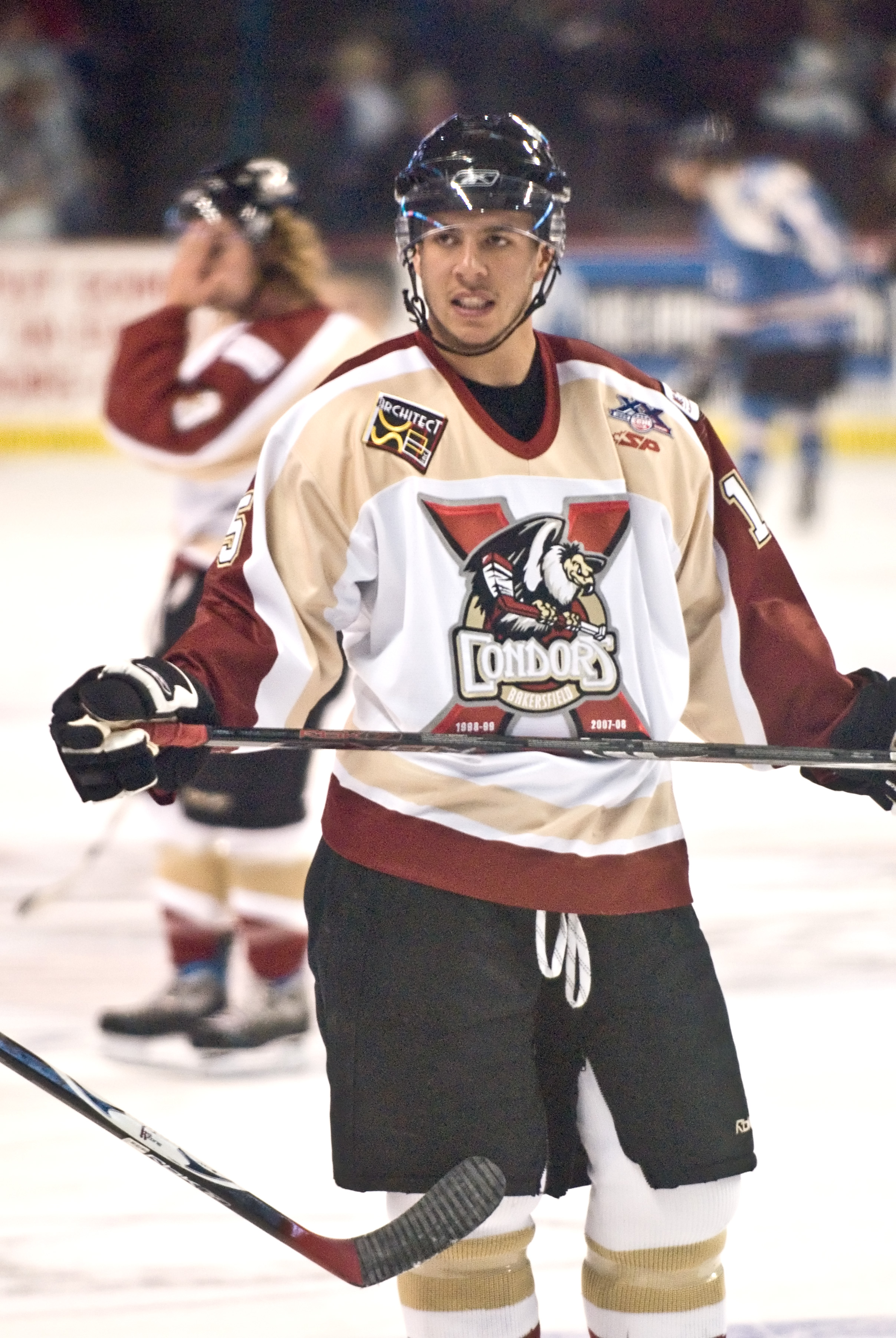
- Born: January 27, 1985 (age 41) Welland, Ontario, Canada
- Height: 5 ft 11 in (180 cm)
- Weight: 181 lb (82 kg; 12 st 13 lb)
- Position: Forward
- Shot: Left
- Played for: AHL; Bridgeport Sound Tigers; ECHL; Toledo Walleye; Reading Royals; Johnstown Chiefs; South Carolina Stingrays; Bakersfield Condors; CHL; Wichita Thunder; Laredo Bucks; Missouri Mavericks; Texas Brahmas; EIHL; Newcastle Vipers
- NHL draft: Undrafted
- Playing career: 2005–2013

Todd Griffith (born January 27, 1985) is a Canadian former professional ice hockey forward.

== Playing career ==
Griffith spent time playing Junior Hockey for the Welland Cougars of the Golden Horseshoe Junior Hockey League and the Belleville Bulls, Owen Sound Attack, and Kingston Frontenacs of the Ontario Hockey League.

Griffith began his professional career with the Laredo Bucks of the Central Hockey League during the 2005-06 season. During the 2006-07 Ice Hockey season, Griffith played 48 games for the Bakersfield Condors of the ECHL and 1 game for the Bridgeport Sound Tigers of the American Hockey League.

During the 2007–08 season, Griffith remained in the ECHL, playing for the Condors and the South Carolina Stingrays. For the 2008-09 Ice Hockey season, Griffith began the season with the Newcastle Vipers of the EIHL, before leaving the team to join the Johnstown Chiefs of the ECHL.

On May 22, 2009, after being with the Chiefs in the interim, Griffith re-signed with the Newcastle Vipers. On October 24, 2009, Griffith left the Vipers again, signing with the Laredo Bucks of the Central Hockey League on January 8, 2010. On November 3, 2010, Griffith was traded by the Bucks to the Texas Brahmas, also of the Central Hockey League, in exchange for Jeff Hazelwood. On February 4, 2011, for the second time during the 2010-2011 season, Griffith was traded, along with Steven Later, to the Missouri Mavericks in exchange for Sean Muncy.

On September 8, 2011, Griffith re-joined the Bucks by signing with the team. On December 11, 2011, Griffith signed with the Reading Royals of the ECHL. On January 29, 2012, Griffith was traded by the Royals to the Toledo Walleye of the ECHL in exchange for Aaron Lewicki and Ryan Blair. On November 19, 2012, Griffith was released by the Walleye. On November 24, 2012, Griffith was signed by the Wichita Thunder of the Central Hockey League.

== Career statistics ==
			Regular season					Playoffs
Season	Team	League	GP	G	A	Pts	PIM	GP	G	A	Pts	PIM
2001–02	Welland Cougars	GHL	27	10	7	17	37	—	—	—	—	—
2002–03	Belleville Bulls	OHL	51	7	1	8	53	7	0	1	1	19
2003–04	Belleville Bulls	OHL	37	9	6	15	46	—	—	—	—	—
2003–04	Owen Sound Attack	OHL	28	6	1	7	22	5	0	2	2	2
2004–05	Kingston Frontenacs	OHL	68	26	32	58	53	—	—	—	—	—
2005–06	Kingston Frontenacs	OHL	55	31	26	57	111	6	2	2	4	12
2005-06	Laredo Bucks	CHL	—	—	—	—	—	7	2	1	3	0
2006–07	Bakersfield Condors	ECHL	46	26	17	43	93	2	0	1	1	6
2006–07	Bridgeport Sound Tigers	AHL	1	0	0	0	2	—	—	—	—	—
2007–08	Bakersfield Condors	ECHL	43	13	16	29	90	—	—	—	—	—
2007–08	South Carolina Stingrays	ECHL	12	6	6	12	16	9	1	0	1	2
2008–09	Newcastle Vipers	EIHL	29	14	7	21	75	—	—	—	—	—
2008–09	Johnstown Chiefs	ECHL	29	10	9	19	97	—	—	—	—	—
2009–10	Newcastle Vipers	EIHL	13	3	6	9	39	—	—	—	—	—
2009–10	Laredo Bucks	CHL	33	12	15	27	27	7	6	3	9	11
2010–11	Texas Brahmas	CHL	16	5	6	11	79	—	—	—	—	—
2010–11	Missouri Mavericks	CHL	24	14	11	25	19	7	0	4	4	4
2011–12	Laredo Bucks	CHL	12	5	7	12	39	—	—	—	—	—
2011–12	Reading Royals	ECHL	14	5	3	8	23	—	—	—	—	—
2011–12	Toledo Walleye	ECHL	24	12	9	21	56	—	—	—	—	—
2012–13	Toledo Walleye	ECHL	4	0	0	0	5	—	—	—	—	—
2012–13	Wichita Thunder	CHL	25	9	11	20	39	6	2	1	3	7
AHL totals			1	0	0	0	2	—	—	—	—	—
ECHL totals			172	72	60	132	380	11	1	1	2	8
CHL totals			110	45	50	95	203	27	10	9	19	22
EIHL totals			42	17	13	30	114	—	—	—	—	—
