= Jeff Nelson (ice hockey) =

Canadian ice hockey player

- Born: December 18, 1972 (age 53) Prince Albert, Saskatchewan, Canada
- Height: 6 ft 0 in (183 cm)
- Weight: 180 lb (82 kg; 12 st 12 lb)
- Position: Centre
- Shot: Left
- Played for: Washington Capitals; Nashville Predators
- NHL draft: 36th overall, 1991; Washington Capitals
- Playing career: 1992–2011

Jeffrey A. C. Nelson (born December 18, 1972) is a Canadian former professional ice hockey player who played in the National Hockey League (NHL). Jeff is the brother of Hershey Bears head coach Todd Nelson.

== Playing career ==
Nelson was selected number thirty six overall by the Washington Capitals in the second round of the 1991 NHL entry draft. Nelson had very significant numbers in the last two years he played in the WHL notching 233 points in only 136 games.

However, Nelson was not able to translate that success to the NHL as he has toiled the majority of his career in the minor leagues. He did get a chance at the NHL when he played in 43 games for the Capitals between the 1994–95 NHL season and the 1995–96 NHL season.

After his very limited success with the Capitals he signed as a free agent with the expansion Nashville Predators on August 19, 1998. While in the Predators organization he played most of his games for the Predators' minor league affiliate the Milwaukee Admirals. However, he did get the chance to play 9 games in the Predators' inaugural season the 1998–99 NHL season. On June 22, 1999, the Predators traded him back to the Capitals for future considerations.

== Career statistics ==
			Regular season					Playoffs
Season	Team	League	GP	G	A	Pts	PIM	GP	G	A	Pts	PIM
1988–89	Prince Albert Raiders	WHL	71	30	57	87	74	4	0	3	3	4
1989–90	Prince Albert Raiders	WHL	72	28	69	97	79	14	2	11	13	10
1990–91	Prince Albert Raiders	WHL	72	46	74	120	58	3	1	1	2	4
1991–92	Prince Albert Raiders	WHL	64	48	65	113	84	9	7	14	21	18
1992–93	Baltimore Skipjacks	AHL	72	14	38	52	12	7	1	3	4	2
1993–94	Portland Pirates	AHL	80	34	73	107	92	17	10	5	15	20
1994–95	Portland Pirates	AHL	64	33	50	83	57	7	1	4	5	8
1994–95	Washington Capitals	NHL	10	1	0	1	2	—	—	—	—	—
1995–96	Washington Capitals	NHL	33	0	7	7	16	3	0	0	0	4
1995–96	Portland Pirates	AHL	39	15	32	47	62	—	—	—	—	—
1996–97	Grand Rapids Griffins	IHL	82	34	55	89	85	5	0	4	4	4
1997–98	Milwaukee Admirals	IHL	52	20	34	54	30	10	2	7	9	15
1998–99	Milwaukee Admirals	IHL	70	20	31	51	66	2	0	0	0	0
1998–99	Nashville Predators	NHL	9	2	1	3	2	—	—	—	—	—
1999–00	Portland Pirates	AHL	73	24	30	54	38	1	0	0	0	0
2000–01	Portland Pirates	AHL	80	18	37	55	63	3	0	2	2	6
2001–02	SERC Wild Wings	DEL	60	13	14	27	60	7	1	3	4	26
2002–03	Cleveland Barons	AHL	80	12	48	60	26	—	—	—	—	—
2003–04	Muskegon Fury	UHL	10	7	14	21	6	—	—	—	—	—
2003–04	Grand Rapids Griffins	AHL	64	14	30	44	43	4	1	0	1	4
2004–05	Muskegon Fury	UHL	78	23	71	94	65	17	4	13	17	16
2005–06	Muskegon Fury	UHL	71	33	83	116	108	12	2	8	10	16
2005–06	Grand Rapids Griffins	AHL	2	1	2	3	6	—	—	—	—	—
2006–07	HC Bolzano	Italy	32	14	30	44	20	5	1	2	3	4
2007–08	Muskegon Fury	IHL	7	0	4	4	8	6	5	2	7	0
2008–09	Mississippi RiverKings	CHL	55	19	39	58	58	12	2	11	13	14
2010–11	Evansville Icemen	CHL	62	15	27	42	34	—	—	—	—	—
NHL totals			52	3	8	11	20	3	0	0	0	4
AHL totals			554	165	340	505	399	39	13	14	27	40

== Awards ==
- WHL East Second All-Star Team – 1991 & 1992
