= A. J. Gale =

Canadian ice hockey player

- Born: February 23, 1987 (age 39) Nanaimo, British Columbia, Canada
- Height: 5 ft 11 in (180 cm)
- Weight: 181 lb (82 kg; 12 st 13 lb)
- Position: Forward
- Shot: Left
- Played for: Copenhagen; Asplöven HC; Lake Erie Monsters; Manchester Monarchs
- NHL draft: Undrafted
- Playing career: 2009–2014

A. J. Gale (born February 23, 1987) is a Canadian former professional ice hockey player. He last played professionally with the Denver Cutthroats of the Central Hockey League (CHL).

== Playing career ==
Undrafted, Gale originally played in the British Columbia Hockey League with the Nanaimo Clippers and at a collegiate level with St. Cloud State University and St. Norbert College.

Gale made his professional debut in the Central Hockey League in the 2009–10 season with the Fort Worth Brahmas before moving to the Wichita Thunder the following season and scoring at a point-per-game pace. In his third professional season, Gale left as a free agent to experience European hockey, initially signing with Copenhagen Hockey of the Danish AL-Bank Ligaen on May 4, 2011.

As an offensively skilled forward, Gale tallied 14 points in 14 games with Copenhagen during the 2011–12 season, before transferring to Sweden on October 28, with Asplöven HC of Division 1. In the remainder of the season, Gale was amongst the club's scoring leaders, scoring 17 goals and 32 points in just 27 games.

Gale returned to North America the following the completion of his season in Sweden and signed a one-year contract with the inaugural Denver Cutthroats of the CHL. His signing on August 8, 2012, marked a reunion alongside former Wichita Thunder team and line mate Troy Schwab. During the 2012–13 season, Gale formed the top scoring line in the CHL alongside Schwab and former NHL veteran Brad Smyth, leading the CHL with 46 goals in just 64 games. On February 20, 2013, Gale was called up to play four games with the American Hockey League affiliate, the Lake Erie Monsters. In returning to the Cutthroats, he finished fourth in league scoring with 84 points and was a finalist for league MVP, before being selected to the All-CHL team.

On August 6, 2013, Gale re-signed on a one-year deal for a second season with the Cutthroats.

== Career statistics ==
			Regular season					Playoffs
Season	Team	League	GP	G	A	Pts	PIM	GP	G	A	Pts	PIM
2003–04	Nanaimo Clippers	BCHL	11	4	2	6	2	5	1	0	1	0
2004–05	Nanaimo Clippers	BCHL	53	19	22	41	53	15	1	2	3	16
2005–06	Nanaimo Clippers	BCHL	60	27	24	51	69	5	1	1	2	2
2006–07	St. Cloud State U.	WCHA	18	0	1	1	8	—	—	—	—	—
2007–08	St. Cloud State U.	WCHA	2	0	0	0	0	—	—	—	—	—
2007–08	Nanaimo Clippers	BCHL	38	27	26	53	46	14	8	18	26	13
2008–09	St. Norbert College	NCHA	19	19	11	30	12	—	—	—	—	—
2009–10	Texas Brahmas	CHL	58	15	10	25	36	7	1	2	3	4
2010–11	Wichita Thunder	CHL	62	26	38	64	38	5	1	4	5	2
2011–12	Copenhagen Hockey	DEN	14	7	7	14	20	—	—	—	—	—
2011–12	Asplöven HC	Swe.2	27	17	15	32	20	10	4	2	6	0
2012–13	Denver Cutthroats	CHL	64	46	38	84	38	5	1	2	3	0
2012–13	Lake Erie Monsters	AHL	4	0	0	0	2	—	—	—	—	—
2013–14	Denver Cutthroats	CHL	25	15	21	36	34	13	11	11	22	15
2013–14	Manchester Monarchs	AHL	27	8	3	11	14	—	—	—	—	—
2014–15	Bentley Generals	ChHL	—	—	—	—	—	8	8	0	8	6
AHL totals			31	8	3	11	16	—	—	—	—	—

== Awards and honours ==
Award	Year
CHL
All-Star Team	2013
All-CHL Team	2013
