= 2010–11 Fort Wayne Komets season =

Hockey competition

2010–11 Fort Wayne Komets
- Conference: Turner
- 2010–11 record: 31-27-8
- Home record: 19-12-5
- Road record: 12-15-3
- Goals for: 187
- Goals against: 204

Team information
- General manager: David Franke
- Coach: Jarrod Skalde
- Assistant coach: Gary Graham
- Captain: Guy Dupuis
- Alternate captains: P. C. Drouin; Kaleigh Schrock
- Arena: Allen County War Memorial Coliseum
- Average attendance: 7,460

Team leaders
- Goals: Tab Lardner (28)
- Assists: Frankie DeAngelis (33)
- Points: Derek Patrosso (44); P.C. Drouin; Frankie DeAngelis
- Penalty minutes: Craig Cescon (174)
- Plus/minus: Four tied at +11
- Wins: Nick Boucher (18)
- Goals against average: Kevin Reiter (2.92)

The 2010–11 Fort Wayne Komets season was the first season in the Central Hockey League of the CHL franchise in Fort Wayne, Indiana.

== Regular season ==
=== Conference standings ===
Turner Conference	GP	W	L	OTL	GF	GA	Pts
y-Rapid City Rush	66	40	22	4	210	200	84
x-Colorado Eagles	66	40	22	4	250	199	84
x-Bloomington PrairieThunder	66	37	22	7	188	189	81
x-Missouri Mavericks	66	37	23	6	213	173	80
x-Wichita Thunder	66	34	26	6	249	231	74
x-Fort Wayne Komets	66	31	27	8	187	204	70
x-Quad City Mallards	66	34	31	1	186	182	69
x-Dayton Gems	66	32	29	5	201	200	69
Evansville IceMen	66	21	32	13	181	242	55

x – Qualified for playoffs; y – Won division; z – Won regular season league title After games of March 27, 2011

== Awards and records ==
=== Awards ===
Regular Season
Player	Award	Awarded
Frankie DeAngelis	Oakley CHL Player of the Week	November 29, 2010

== Transactions ==
The Komets have been involved in the following transactions during the 2010–11 season.

Trades
November 26, 2010	To Missouri Mavericks: Future Considerations	To Fort Wayne: Tab Lardner

== Roster ==
No.	Nat	Player	Pos	S/G	Age	Acquired	Birthplace	Contract
33	(Canada)	Nick Boucher	G	L	44	2007	Leduc, Alberta	Komets
72	(Canada)	Craig Cescon	D	L	38	2010	Mississauga, Ontario	Komets
91	(Canada)	Colin Chaulk	F	L	48	2007	Toronto, Ontario	Komets
94	(Canada)	Mathieu Curadeau	RW	L	40	2010	Montreal, Quebec	Komets
14	(Canada)	Frankie DeAngelis	D	L	40	2009	Woodbridge, Ontario	Komets
	(Canada)	Steven Delisle	D	R	34	2010	Levis, Quebec	Blue Jackets
71	(Canada)	P. C. Drouin (A)	LW	L	50	2007	Saint-Lambert, Quebec	Komets
22	(Canada)	Dan Lapointe	F		40	2011	Victoria, British Columbia	Komets
23	(Canada)	Tab Lardner	F	L	45	2010	Edmonton, Alberta	Komets
--	(United States)	Jamie Milam	D	R	40	2011	Lake Orion, Michigan	Komets
3	(Canada)	Danko Mironovic	D	L	37	2008	Mississauga, Ontario	Komets
4	(Canada)	Dustin Molle	D	L	39	2010	Dundas, Ontario	Komets
15	(Canada)	Neil Musselwhite	F		39	2010	Burlington, Ontario	Komets
29	(United States)	Sean O'Connor	RW	R	38	2009	Brownstown, Michigan	Komets
39	(United States)	Derek Petrosso	RW	R	40	2010	Northville, Michigan	Komets
20	(United States)	Bobby Phillips	D	L	39	2009	Erie, Pennsylvania	Komets
55	(Russia)	Artem Podshendyalov	F		35	2010	Omsk, Soviet Union	Komets
35	(United States)	Kevin Reiter	G	L	43	2010	Pittsburgh, Pennsylvania	Komets
7	(United States)	Keith Rodger	D	R	40	2009	Parshall, Colorado	Komets
79	(United States)	Kaleigh Schrock (A)	RW	R	40	2009	Fort Wayne, Indiana	Komets
--	(Canada)	Brett Smith	C	L	43	2011	Guelph, Ontario	Komets
44	(Canada)	Leo Thomas	C	R	43	2008	Toronto, Ontario	Komets
9	(United States)	Brandon Warner	D	R	42	2007	Huntertown, Indiana	Komets

== Affiliates ==
- NHL - Columbus Blue Jackets
- AHL - Springfield Falcons

== See also ==
- 2010–11 CHL season
