= Jason Goulet =

Canadian ice hockey player

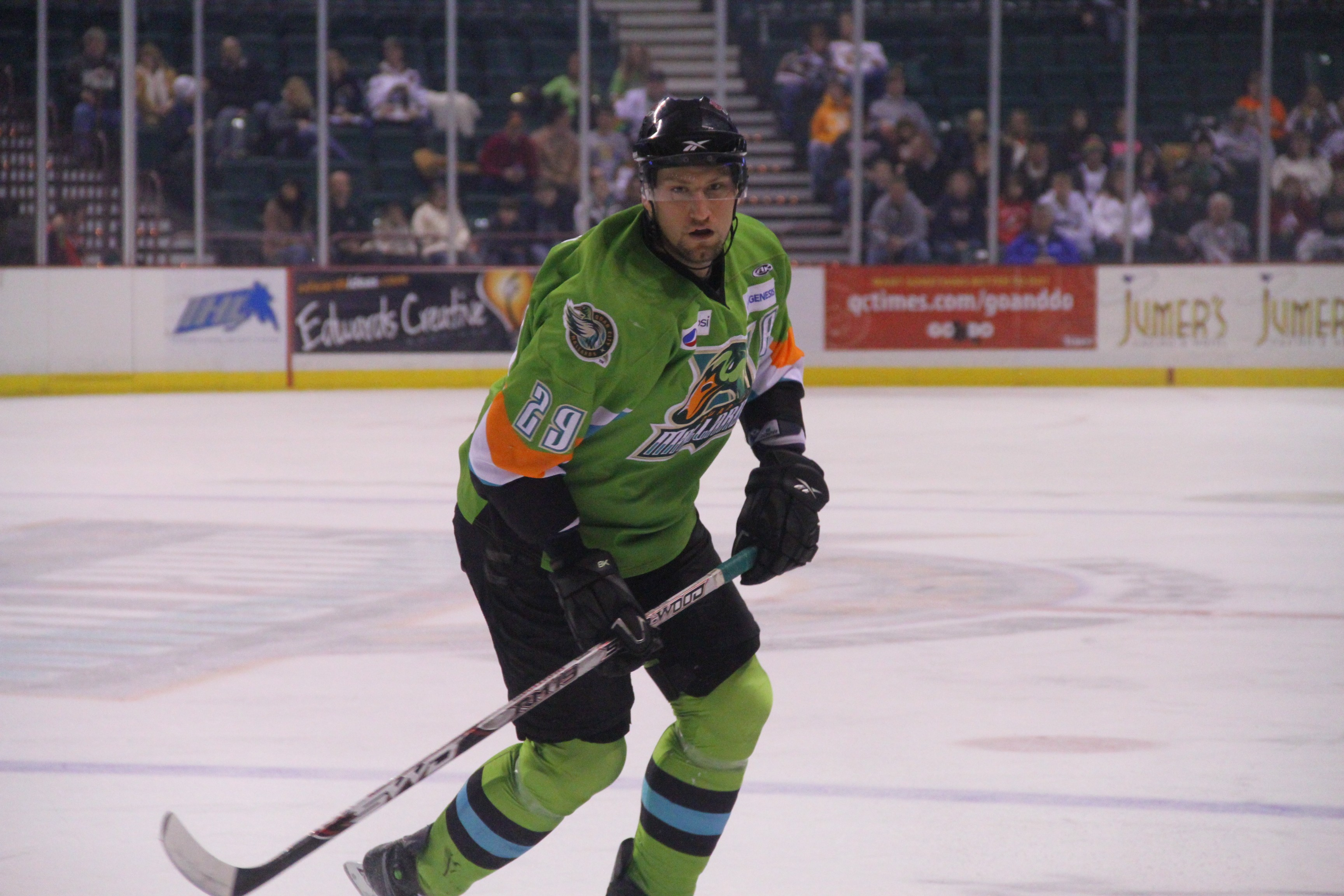
- Born: February 25, 1983 (age 43) Winnipeg, Manitoba, Canada
- Height: 6 ft 5 in (196 cm)
- Weight: 248 lb (112 kg; 17 st 10 lb)
- Position: Defence
- Shot: Right
- Played for: Bridgeport Sound Tigers; Basingstoke Bison
- Playing career: 2004–2012

Jason Goulet (born February 25, 1983) is a Canadian former professional ice hockey defenceman.

== Playing career ==
Goulet played junior hockey in the Western Hockey League for the Saskatoon Blades and the Prince George Cougars. He also played in the Saskatchewan Junior Hockey League for the Battlefords North Stars. He began his pro career in the ECHL with the Fresno Falcons. He then moved to the Oklahoma City Blazers of the Central Hockey League. He split the 2006-07 season in the ECHL with the Pensacola Ice Pilots and the Cincinnati Cyclones and the American Hockey League with the Bridgeport Sound Tigers. He then split the 2007-08 season with ECHL teams the Bakersfield Condors and the Dayton Bombers. In 2008, Goulet signed with the Basingstoke Bison of the United Kingdom.

On November 29, 2008, Goulet was signed by the newly-formed Rapid City Rush of the Central Hockey League (CHL). On that same day he played his first game with his new team - the Rush's inaugural home game and the first professional hockey game in South Dakota sports history. During the game he recorded the first fight in Rush franchise history when he faced off with the Colorado Eagles' Jay Birnie.

In September 2009 Goulet was signed by the Quad City Mallards of the International Hockey League.

In the 2010–11 off-season, Goulet signed a one-year deal with the Wichita Thunder of the Central Hockey League. After a solitary season, on August 8, 2011, he moved to the Arizona Sundogs on a one-year contract for the 2011–12 season.

== Career statistics ==
			Regular season					Playoffs
Season	Team	League	GP	G	A	Pts	PIM	GP	G	A	Pts	PIM
1999–00	Dauphin Kings	MJHL	53	0	5	5	81	—	—	—	—	—
2000–01	Saskatoon Blades	WHL	22	0	0	0	12	—	—	—	—	—
2000–01	Dauphin Kings	MJHL	14	0	1	1	2	—	—	—	—	—
2001–02	Saskatoon Blades	WHL	9	0	0	0	9	—	—	—	—	—
2002–03	Prince George Cougars	WHL	63	1	5	6	137	5	0	0	0	11
2003–04	Prince George Cougars	WHL	8	0	1	1	24	—	—	—	—	—
2003–04	Battlefords North Stars	SJHL	30	2	3	5	96	—	—	—	—	—
2003–04	Fresno Falcons	ECHL	13	0	1	1	23	—	—	—	—	—
2004–05	Kalamazoo Wings	UHL	3	0	0	0	10	—	—	—	—	—
2004–05	Oklahoma City Blazers	CHL	44	2	6	8	133	—	—	—	—	—
2005–06	Oklahoma City Blazers	CHL	64	4	6	10	248	7	0	0	0	6
2006–07	Bridgeport Sound Tigers	AHL	8	0	0	0	20	—	—	—	—	—
2006–07	Pensacola Ice Pilots	ECHL	36	2	5	7	101	—	—	—	—	—
2006–07	Cincinnati Cyclones	ECHL	22	1	2	3	49	—	—	—	—	—
2007–08	Dayton Bombers	ECHL	7	0	0	0	19	—	—	—	—	—
2007–08	Bakersfield Condors	ECHL	54	1	5	6	160	—	—	—	—	—
2008–09	Basingstoke Bison	EIHL	11	1	1	2	24	—	—	—	—	—
2008–09	Rapid City Rush	CHL	52	0	6	6	165	—	—	—	—	—
2009–10	Quad City Mallards	IHL	73	2	8	10	212	—	—	—	—	—
2010–11	Wichita Thunder	CHL	39	0	4	4	121	5	0	0	0	4
2011–12	Arizona Sundogs	CHL	25	0	2	2	60	—	—	—	—	—
ECHL totals			132	4	13	17	352	—	—	—	—	—
CHL totals			224	6	24	30	727	12	0	0	0	10
