= Rob Nolan =

Canadian ice hockey player

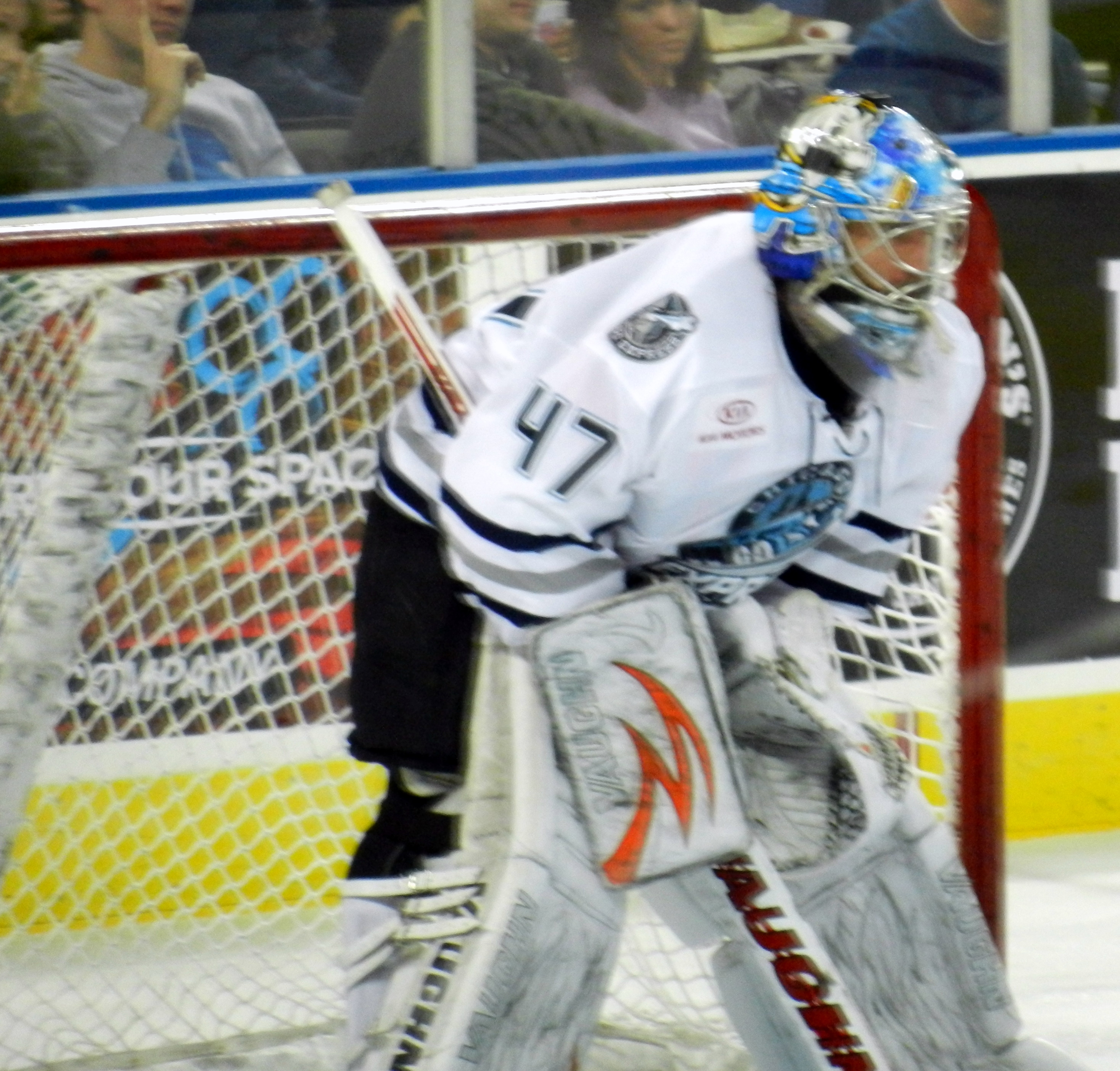
- Nolan with the Chicago Express in 2011
- Born: December 10, 1985 (age 39); Sherwood Park, Alberta, Canada
- Height: 5 ft 10 in (178 cm)
- Weight: 190 lb (86 kg; 13 st 8 lb)
- Position: Goaltender
- Caught: left
- Played for: Flint Generals; Missouri Mavericks; Chicago Express; Toledo Walleye; Colorado Eagles; Frederikshavn White Hawks
- NHL draft: Undrafted
- Playing career: 2009–2013

Rob Nolan (born December 10, 1985) is a Canadian former professional ice hockey goaltender.

After playing collegiately at Michigan Tech, he played professionally for the Flint Generals of the International Hockey League (IHL) for the 2009–10 IHL Season and for the Missouri Mavericks of the Central Hockey League during the 2010-2011 Central Hockey League season.

On September 20, 2011, Nolan signed as a free agent with the Chicago Express of the ECHL. On January 4, 2012, Nolan was traded to the Toledo Walleye of the ECHL for future considerations. That same season, Nolan was traded yet again to the Colorado Eagles of the ECHL, again for future considerations. During that same season, Nolan was twice loaned to the Houston Aeros of the American Hockey League but was returned by the Aeros both times without playing any games for that team.

Nolan then spent the 2012-2013 season (the last of his professional career) with the Danish club Frederikshavn White Hawks (Frederikshavn IK) of the AL-Bank Liagen.

== Career statistics ==
=== Regular season ===
Season	Team	League	GP	W	L	T	OTL	MIN	GA	SO	GAA	SV%
2005-06	Michigan Tech	WCHA	0	11	2	0	—	886	60	0	4.06	0.888
2006-07	Michigan Tech	WCHA	20	7	9	2	—	1170	44	1	2.26	0.910
2007-08	Michigan Tech	WCHA	18	6	9	1	—	992	44	0	2.66	0.899
2008-09	Michigan Tech	WCHA	25	2	17	5	—	1356	69	0	3.05	0.894
2009-10	Flint Generals	IHL	49	19	22	4	—	2679	129	1	2.89	0.912
2010-11	Missouri Mavericks	CHL	44	26	13	5	—	2553	88	7	2.07	0.928
2011-12	Chicago Express	ECHL	16	6	8	1	—	844	42	0	2.99	0.896
2011-12	Toledo Walleye	ECHL	11	3	3	2	—	558	36	1	3.87	0.871
2011-12	Colorado Eagles	ECHL	3	0	2	0	—	150	8	0	3.21	0.912
2012-13	Frederikshavn White Hawks	AL-Bank Liagen	9				—	555	15	0	1.62	0.947

== Awards and honours ==
- 2010–11 All-CHL Team
- 2010–11 CHL All-Star Team
- 2010–11 CHL Most Outstanding Goaltender
