= Kory Scoran =

Canadian ice hockey player

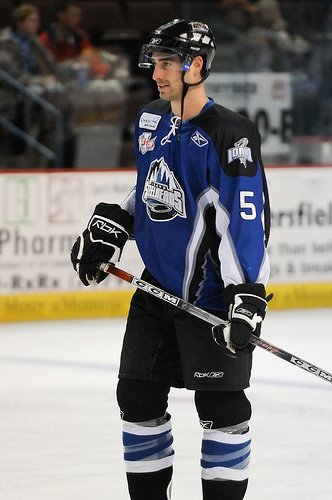
- Kory Scoran when playing for the Idaho Steelheads.
- Born: August 24, 1981 (age 45) Winnipeg, Manitoba, Canada
- Height: 6 ft 3 in (191 cm)
- Weight: 220 lb (100 kg; 15 st 10 lb)
- Position: Defence
- Shot: Left
- ECHL team Former teams: Idaho Steelheads; CHL; Wichita Thunder
- Playing career: 2006–2012

Kory Scoran (born August 24, 1981, Winnipeg, Manitoba) is a Canadian former professional ice hockey defenceman. He played Division 1 Hockey for Lake Superior State University before turning professional with the Idaho Steelheads of the ECHL, where he spent four seasons and won the Kelly Cup in 2006-07. Kory then joined the Tilburg Trappers in the Netherlands, before returning to North America to play for the Wichita Thunder of the Central Hockey League and later rejoining the Steelheads. He played a total of six professional seasons. He is now the Hockey Director at Idaho Ice World.

== Career statistics ==
			Regular season					Playoffs
Season	Team	League	GP	G	A	Pts	PIM	GP	G	A	Pts	PIM
2002–03	Lake Superior State University	NCAA	32	2	1	3	12	—	—	—	—	—
2003–04	Lake Superior State University	NCAA	36	2	10	12	16	—	—	—	—	—
2004–05	Lake Superior State University	NCAA	37	6	6	12	22	—	—	—	—	—
2005–06	Lake Superior State University	NCAA	35	5	8	13	10	—	—	—	—	—
2005–06	Idaho Steelheads	ECHL	1	0	0	0	0	7	0	0	0	4
2006–07	Idaho Steelheads	ECHL	67	2	19	21	57	22	3	4	7	18
2007–08	Idaho Steelheads	ECHL	64	5	18	23	32	4	0	2	2	0
2008–09	Idaho Steelheads	ECHL	68	5	28	33	58	4	0	0	0	2
2009–10	Tilburg Trappers	NIJB	42	9	24	33	34	—	—	—	—	—
2010–11	Wichita Thunder	CHL	64	12	22	34	49	5	0	2	2	12
2011–12	Idaho Steelheads	ECHL	37	1	15	16	8	10	0	6	6	19

== Awards ==
ECHL

- Defenseman of the Year Lake Superior State University
- CCHA Defenseman of the week
- Idaho Steelheads’ Most Improved Player - 2006-2007
- Won Kelly Cup with Idaho Steelheads - 2007
- Selected to play in the All Star Game in 2010-2011 in the Netherlands
- Defenseman of the Year (Idaho Steelheads)
- Second all time in points for defenseman for the Idaho Steelheads(in the ECHL Era)
