= Jeff Kyrzakos =

Canadian ice hockey player

- Born: February 6, 1985 (age 41) Mississauga, Ontario, Canada
- Height: 6 ft 2 in (188 cm)
- Weight: 195 lb (88 kg; 13 st 13 lb)
- Position: Centre
- Shot: Right
- Played for: ECHL; Phoenix RoadRunners; Charlotte Checkers; Stockton Thunder; Mississippi Sea Wolves; CHL; Bossier-Shreveport Mudbugs; Rapid City Rush; Arizona Sundogs
- NHL draft: Undrafted
- Playing career: 2006–2013

Jeff Kyrzakos (born February 6, 1985) is a Canadian former professional ice hockey player. He last played with the Arizona Sundogs of the Central Hockey League (CHL) He is currently the Head Coach and Assistant GM of the OHL's Kitchener Rangers.

Kyrzakos was a member of the 2010–11 Ray Miron President's Cup winning Bossier-Shreveport Mudbugs CHL championship team, and was selected as the 2011 CHL playoff's most valuable player.

== Awards and honours ==
| Honours | Year |
|---|---|
| CHL Playoff Most Valuable Player | 2010–11 |
