= Troy Schwab =

Canadian ice hockey player (born 1984)

- Born: December 24, 1984 (age 41) Kindersley, Saskatchewan, Canada
- Height: 5 ft 8 in (173 cm)
- Weight: 190 lb (86 kg; 13 st 8 lb)
- Position: Center
- Shot: Left
- Played for: Johnstown Chiefs; Wichita Thunder; Eispiraten Crimmitschau; Denver Cutthroats; Toledo Walleye
- NHL draft: Undrafted
- Playing career: 2009–2015

Troy Schwab (born December 24, 1984) is a Canadian former professional ice hockey center, who played in the ECHL and the Central Hockey League. He is currently an assistant coach for the Greenville Swamp Rabbits.

== Playing career ==
Schwab first played minor Junior A hockey with his hometown club, the Kindersley Klippers, of the Saskatchewan Junior Hockey League. After helping win the title in 2004, Schwab led the team and league in scoring with 85 points the following season to be selected to the First All-Star Team and recognized as the 2005 league MVP.

Schwab then committed to play collegiate hockey in the United States, for Lake Superior State University of the Central Collegiate Hockey Association. As a smaller-sized offensive forward, Schwab immediately contributed with the Lakers, contributing 28 points in his freshman season in the 2005–06 season. Impressively elevated to the leadership group in just his sophomore season, Schawb assumed the captaincy by his Junior year. He completed his four-year collegiate career with a productive 110 points over 150 games.

Undrafted initially due to his diminutive size, he was signed to an ECHL contract with the Johnstown Chiefs to begin his professional career. Schwab with fellow collegiate rookie, Connor Shields, led the Chiefs offense in 2009–10 and compiled a team leading 35 assists for 53 points in 67 games. Upon the season end, and with the 22 year operation of the Chiefs folding, Schwab was invited to the Oklahoma City Barons training camp for the following season.

After his release from the Barons training camp, Schwab moved to the Central Hockey League with the Wichita Thunder on October 20, 2010. He amassed 55 points in 54 games during the 2010–11 season, before losing in the first round of the playoffs for the Ray Miron President's Cup. In the offseason on June 26, 2011, his rights were dealt by the Thunder to the Allen Americans in exchange for goalie Chris Whitley.

Without coming to terms with the Americans, Schwab signed for his first European venture on a one-year contract with ETC Crimmitschau of the German 2nd Bundesliga on August 1, 2011. During the 2011–12 season he was among the team leaders in scoring, earning top line time, recording 45 points in 45 games to place second on the Pirates.

Schwab returned to North America the following the completion of his season in Germany and signed a one-year contract with the inaugural Denver Cutthroats of the CHL. His signing on August 8, 2012, marked a reunion alongside former Wichita Thunder team and line mate AJ Gale.

After two successful seasons with the Cutthroats, Schwab opted to leave as the Cutthroats' franchise leading scorer, to sign a one-year contract with the Toledo Walleye of the ECHL on August 8, 2014. In the 2014–15 season, Schwab resumed his role as an offensive leader posting 60 points in 70 games with the top ranked Walleye. He increased his scoring rate in the post-season with 22 points in 21 contests, as the Walleye reached the conference finals.

On July 12, 2015, Schwab announced his retirement from professional hockey.

== Career statistics ==
			Regular season					Playoffs
Season	Team	League	GP	G	A	Pts	PIM	GP	G	A	Pts	PIM
2001–02	Kindersley Klippers	SJHL	61	28	40	68	57	—	—	—	—	—
2002–03	Kindersley Klippers	SJHL	60	25	41	66	103	—	—	—	—	—
2003–04	Kindersley Klippers	SJHL	55	29	36	65	82	—	—	—	—	—
2004–05	Kindersley Klippers	SJHL	51	25	60	85	162	—	—	—	—	—
2005–06	Lake Superior State U.	CCHA	34	8	16	24	18	—	—	—	—	—
2006–07	Lake Superior State U.	CCHA	41	6	24	30	30	—	—	—	—	—
2007–08	Lake Superior State U.	CCHA	36	6	18	24	24	—	—	—	—	—
2008–09	Lake Superior State U.	CCHA	39	11	21	32	30	—	—	—	—	—
2009–10	Johnstown Chiefs	ECHL	67	18	35	53	75	—	—	—	—	—
2010–11	Wichita Thunder	CHL	54	19	36	55	71	5	2	1	3	2
2011–12	ETC Crimmitschau	2.GBun	45	19	26	45	78	—	—	—	—	—
2012–13	Denver Cutthroats	CHL	66	21	60	81	48	5	0	4	4	4
2013–14	Denver Cutthroats	CHL	66	25	71	96	81	16	8	15	23	30
2014–15	Toledo Walleye	ECHL	70	19	41	60	35	21	8	14	22	21
CHL totals			186	65	167	232	200	26	10	20	30	36

== Awards and honours ==
Award	Year
SJHL First All-Star Team	2005
SJHL Most Valuable Player	2005
All-CHL Team (First Team All-Star)	2013–14
