= Andrew Martens =

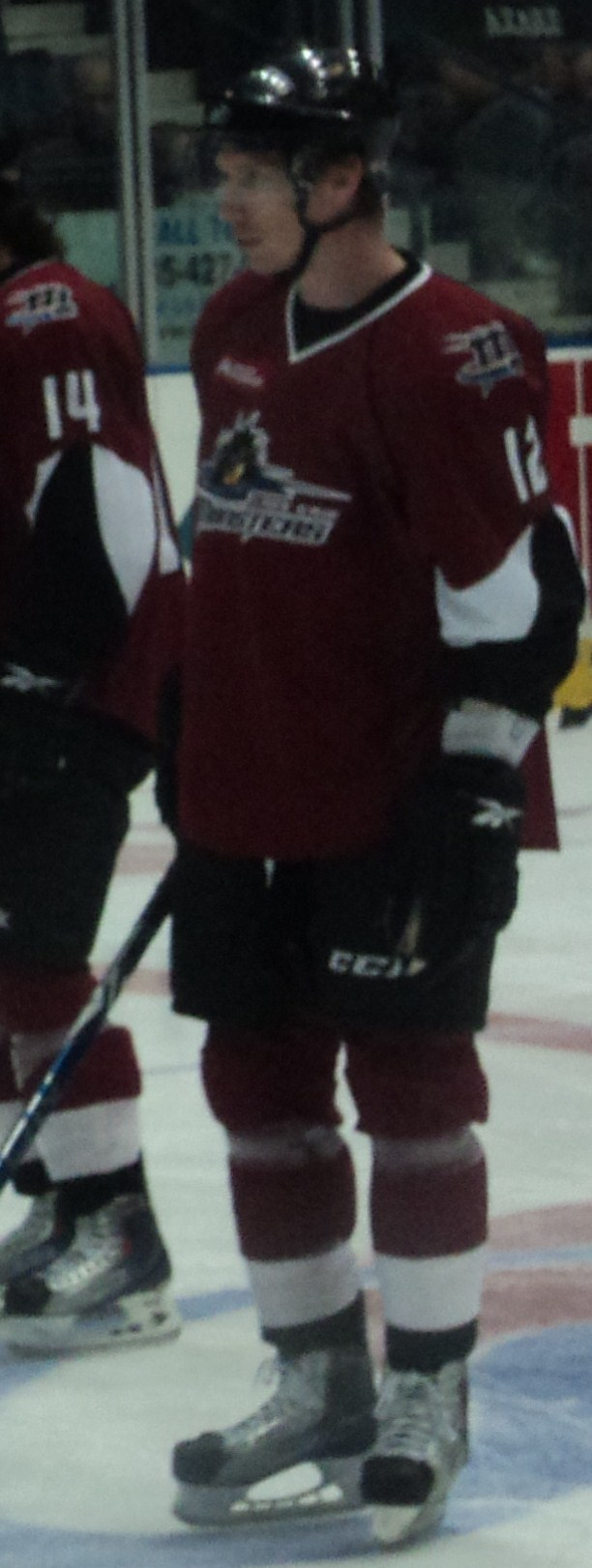
- Born: July 5, 1981 (age 44) Calgary, Alberta, Canada
- Height: 6 ft 1 in (185 cm)
- Weight: 205 lb (93 kg; 14 st 9 lb)
- Position: Defence
- Shot: Left
- Played for: Manitoba Moose; Toronto Marlies; Lake Erie Monsters; Oklahoma City Barons
- NHL draft: Undrafted
- Playing career: 2005–2014

Andrew Martens (born July 5, 1981) is a Canadian former professional ice hockey defenceman who most notably played for the Wichita Thunder of the then Central Hockey League.

== Playing career ==
He played three seasons of college hockey at Bemidji State University before turning pro in the 2005–06 season. In the 2010–11 season with the Thunder, Martens scored 54 points in 65 games to be named Wichita's defenseman of the year and the CHL's most outstanding defenceman. He is a native of Calgary, Alberta.

On December 28, 2011, Martens signed a PTO with the Oklahoma City Barons of the American Hockey League.

After four seasons with Thunder and after the club were granted admission into the ECHL, Martens despite being team captain opted to retire from professional hockey prior to the 2014–15 season on October 9, 2014.

== Career statistics ==
			Regular season					Playoffs
Season	Team	League	GP	G	A	Pts	PIM	GP	G	A	Pts	PIM
2002–03	Bemidji State University	CHA	28	4	1	5	4	—	—	—	—	—
2004–05	Bemidji State University	CHA	36	2	9	11	16	—	—	—	—	—
2005–06	Bemidji State University	CHA	37	5	19	24	47	—	—	—	—	—
2005–06	Greenville Grrrowl	ECHL	5	0	1	1	2	6	0	1	1	0
2006–07	Johnstown Chiefs	ECHL	70	6	24	30	50	2	0	0	0	0
2007–08	Johnstown Chiefs	ECHL	72	9	29	38	73	6	1	0	1	8
2008–09	Ontario Reign	ECHL	48	7	24	31	78	3	2	3	5	2
2008–09	Manitoba Moose	AHL	11	0	5	5	6	—	—	—	—	—
2008–09	Toronto Marlies	AHL	16	1	5	6	6	2	0	0	0	0
2009–10	Ontario Reign	ECHL	72	4	33	37	44	—	—	—	—	—
2010–11	Wichita Thunder	CHL	65	15	39	54	51	5	1	0	1	23
2010–11	Lake Erie Monsters	AHL	1	0	0	0	2	—	—	—	—	—
2011–12	Wichita Thunder	CHL	33	9	17	26	22	—	—	—	—	—
2011–12	Oklahoma City Barons	AHL	12	0	1	1	2	—	—	—	—	—
2011–12	Toronto Marlies	AHL	13	0	2	2	8	—	—	—	—	—
2012–13	Wichita Thunder	CHL	66	7	35	42	34	15	2	8	10	10
2013–14	Wichita Thunder	CHL	63	12	38	50	50	—	—	—	—	—
AHL totals			53	1	13	14	24	2	0	0	0	0

== Awards and honours ==
Award	Year
College
All-CHA First Team	2005–06
Central Hockey League
Most Outstanding Defenseman	2010–11
All-CHL Team	2010–11
