= Joe Grimaldi (ice hockey) =

American Professional ice hockey player

- Born: August 23, 1986 (age 39) Queens, New York, U.S.
- Height: 6 ft 0 in (183 cm)
- Weight: 192 lb (87 kg; 13 st 10 lb)
- Position: Defense
- Shot: Right
- Played for: Rochester Americans; Albany River Rats; Peoria Rivermen; Rosenborg IHK; Nottingham Panthers; HC Valpellice; Colorado Eagles; Edinburgh Capitals
- National team: United States
- NHL draft: Undrafted
- Playing career: 2007–2015

Joe Grimaldi (born August 23, 1986) is an American former professional ice hockey defenseman.

== Early life ==
Undrafted in the NHL, drafted in seventh round by the Windsor Spitfires in the Ontario Hockey League. He was soon asked to play for Team USA at age 16. Grimaldi was a part of the United States National Team Development Program from 2002–04. He won one gold medal at the four nations cup and an International Ice Hockey Federation silver medal in Minsk at the world championships in 2004. Grimaldi chose to enroll at the University of Nebraska Omaha of the CCHA.

In the 2004–05 season, Grimaldi scored 21 points and was named to the CCHA All-Rookie Team. The University of Nebraska Omaha named him most consistent player with +24 plus/minus leading all of college hockey in the 2004–2005 season.

== Career ==
In his second year with the Mavericks, he left for major junior hockey in the Ontario Hockey League with the Ottawa 67's. Brian Kilrea helmed the bench as head coach. While he was with the 67's he signed with the New York Islanders. He played exhibition games with the Islanders before getting sent back to Ottawa for future development. In the 2007–08 season, Grimaldi turned pro officially and signed with the Rochester Americans, an affiliate of the Buffalo Sabres, and was later sent down to the Elmira Jackals (Ottawa Senators) of the ECHL. Grimaldi played in 36 games recording 15 points as a rookie with the Jackals and made his AHL debut with the Rochester Americans and Albany River Rats, an affiliate of the Carolina Hurricanes. On January 15, 2008, Grimaldi was traded to fellow ECHL team the Fresno Falcons, affiliate to the San Jose Sharks. He was later flipped to the Gwinnett Gladiators on February 19. He then played for his sixth team in the year when he was called up to the Peoria Rivermen affiliate for the St. Louis Blues. During his four-game stint, he recorded one assist in the season's last four games. Grimaldi started the 2008–09 season with the Cincinnati Cyclones of the ECHL before returning to the Jackals placing third on the team with 101 penalty minutes. He attended Elmira's training camp before the 2009–10 but because of his previous ankle injury from the year before, he was not cleared to play yet. He later signed a contract midway through the season on December 12, 2009. However, after playing in 33 games with Elmira before departing the team on March 17, 2010.

Grimaldi had retired after the 2010 season due to numerous injuries, but the following year signed in the Atlantic Hockey League with the Colorado Eagles, an affiliate of the Colorado Avalanche. Grimaldi later signed in the GET Ligaen in Norway.

In 2013 Grimaldi played his first overseas season in Norway for Rosenberg in the GET Ligaen. Grimaldi was hit from behind early in the season and suffered a C2 fracture. Grimaldi rehabbed in Norway for 3 months before returning to play. Following that year, Grimaldi joined the Nottingham Panthers of the Elite Ice Hockey League (EIHL) for the 2013–2014 season. He played seven games before feuding with Coach Corey Neilson which led to his release, tallying 8 points (2 goals, 6 assists). During his brief stint, Grimaldi racked up 110 penalty minutes.

The Edinburgh Capitals of the same EIHL chose to bring him back for the 2014–15 season. Grimaldi played until his release on January 4, 2015, stemming from an incident the previous evening. On January 3, 2015, playing against his former team the Nottingham Panthers, Grimaldi made an open-ice hit to the head of Evan Mosey which led to being challenged to fight by Max Parent. Grimaldi was seen to spear Parent intentionally with his stick. Grimaldi then proceeded to throw his helmet at Parent, striking his face, followed immediately with a sucker punch. Parent however still won the brawl, with his own take down when they returned to their feet

[4] Thrown out of the game, picking up 69 minutes' worth of penalties, Grimaldi was released the following day amidst the impending ban confirmed days later by the DOPS (Department of Player Safety) of 18 games.[4] Grimaldi decided to retire shortly after returning stateside.

== Career statistics ==
=== Regular season and playoffs ===
			Regular season					Playoffs
Season	Team	League	GP	G	A	Pts	PIM	GP	G	A	Pts	PIM
2002–03	U.S. National Development Team	NAHL	43	0	5	5	146	—	—	—	—	—
2003–04	U.S. National Development Team	USDP	51	1	4	5	62	—	—	—	—	—
2004–05	U. of Nebraska-Omaha	CCHA	38	4	13	17	44	—	—	—	—	—
2005–06	U. of Nebraska-Omaha	CCHA	19	0	4	4	51	—	—	—	—	—
2005–06	Ottawa 67's	OHL	27	7	14	21	81	6	2	4	6	10
2006–07	Ottawa 67's	OHL	65	2	34	36	185	5	0	1	1	16
2007–08	Elmira Jackals	ECHL	36	2	12	14	53	—	—	—	—	—
2007–08	Rochester Americans	AHL	2	0	0	0	5	—	—	—	—	—
2007–08	Albany River Rats	AHL	1	0	0	0	7	—	—	—	—	—
2007–08	Fresno Falcons	ECHL	10	1	2	3	15	—	—	—	—	—
2007–08	Gwinnett Gladiators	ECHL	21	1	3	4	74	1	0	0	0	0
2007–08	Peoria Rivermen	AHL	4	0	1	1	6	—	—	—	—	—
2008–09	Cincinnati Cyclones	ECHL	3	0	1	1	20	—	—	—	—	—
2008–09	Elmira Jackals	ECHL	32	2	7	9	101	—	—	—	—	—
2009–10	Elmira Jackals	ECHL	33	1	7	8	104	—	—	—	—	—
2010–11	Evansville IceMen	CHL	17	5	6	11	45	—	—	—	—	—
2010–11	Colorado Eagles	CHL	45	4	20	24	171	21	1	1	2	83
2011–12	Rapid City Rush	CHL	2	0	0	0	11	—	—	—	—	—
2013–14	Rosenborg IHK	GET-ligaen	5	1	1	2	50	—	—	—	—	—
2013–14	Nottingham Panthers	EIHL	6	2	6	8	83	—	—	—	—	—
2013–14	HC Valpellice	ITA	3	0	1	1	14	6	0	1	1	4
2014–15	Edinburgh Capitals	EIHL	14	2	6	8	102	—	—	—	—	—
AHL totals			7	0	1	1	18	—	—	—	—	—

=== International ===
Year	Team	Comp	GP	G	A	Pts	PIM
2004	United States	WJC18	6	0	0	0	2
Junior int'l totals			6	0	0	0	2

== Awards and honors ==
Award	Year
All-CCHA Rookie Team BBOTW	2004-05 2014-15
