= Riley Nelson =

Canadian ice hockey player (born 1977)

- Born: November 8, 1977 (age 48) Cranbrook, British Columbia, Canada
- Height: 5 ft 9 in (175 cm)
- Weight: 170 lb (77 kg; 12 st 2 lb)
- Position: Centre
- Played for: Rochester Americans; San Antonio Rampage; Colorado Eagles
- NHL draft: Undrafted
- Playing career: 2000–2014

Riley Nelson (born November 8, 1977) is a Canadian former professional ice hockey player who most notably played 11 seasons for minor league team, the Colorado Eagles in the ECHL. He is the all-time franchise leader in goals, assists and points for the Eagles. On announcing his retirement the Eagles immediately pronounced that his number 12 jersey would be retired and raised to the rafters during the 2014–15 season on December 12, 2014.

Nelson took up a job in the Oil and Gas industry and remains tied to the Eagles as the club's video coach. Also works with Colorado Jr Eagles.

== Career statistics ==
			Regular season					Playoffs
Season	Team	League	GP	G	A	Pts	PIM	GP	G	A	Pts	PIM
1994–95	Cranbrook Colts	RMJHL	51	17	32	49	48	—	—	—	—	—
1995–96	Cranbrook Colts	RMJHL	55	45	57	102	83	—	—	—	—	—
1996–97	Michigan Tech University	WCHA	31	4	11	15	8	—	—	—	—	—
1997–98	Michigan Tech University	WCHA	40	17	22	39	19	—	—	—	—	—
1998–99	Michigan Tech University	WCHA	36	10	14	24	20	—	—	—	—	—
1999–00	Michigan Tech University	WCHA	36	2	8	10	8	—	—	—	—	—
2000–01	Columbus Cottonmouths	CHL	70	20	27	47	37	14	1	3	4	4
2001–02	Knoxville Speed	UHL	65	37	33	70	30	—	—	—	—	—
2002–03	Missouri River Otters	UHL	51	27	27	54	22	—	—	—	—	—
2002–03	Rochester Americans	AHL	28	4	7	11	4	3	0	0	0	2
2003–04	Colorado Eagles	CHL	54	33	49	82	43	4	1	5	6	4
2003–04	San Antonio Rampage	AHL	4	0	0	0	0	—	—	—	—	—
2004–05	Colorado Eagles	CHL	60	34	44	78	32	16	7	10	17	8
2005–06	Colorado Eagles	CHL	64	26	49	75	61	12	5	6	11	14
2006–07	Colorado Eagles	CHL	64	41	47	88	38	25	13	15	28	24
2007–08	Colorado Eagles	CHL	64	37	54	91	44	16	4	12	16	10
2008–09	Colorado Eagles	CHL	63	29	53	82	30	15	5	11	16	12
2009–10	Colorado Eagles	CHL	64	31	63	94	36	4	2	1	3	4
2010–11	Colorado Eagles	CHL	66	34	59	93	18	22	10	15	25	8
2011–12	Colorado Eagles	ECHL	66	25	35	60	45	2	1	1	2	2
2012–13	Colorado Eagles	ECHL	26	4	10	14	18	—	—	—	—	—
2013–14	Colorado Eagles	ECHL	66	9	26	35	28	6	0	4	4	0
CHL totals			569	285	445	730	339	128	48	78	126	88
ECHL totals			158	38	71	109	91	8	1	5	6	2
AHL totals			32	4	7	11	4	3	0	0	0	2

== Awards and honours ==
- 2010–11 All-CHL Team.
