= Ryan Menei =

Canadian ice hockey player

- Born: July 31, 1986 (age 40) Winnipeg, Manitoba, Canada
- Height: 5 ft 2 in (157 cm)
- Weight: 245 lb (111 kg; 17 st 7 lb)
- Position: Right wing
- Shot: Right
- Played for: UHL; Muskegon Fury; ECHL; Mississippi Sea Wolves; Johnstown Chiefs; Bakersfield Condors; CHL; Rapid City Rush; Tulsa Oilers; Serie A HC Asiago; SG Cortina
- NHL draft: Undrafted
- Playing career: 2006–2014

Ryan Menei (born July 31, 1986) is a former Canadian professional ice hockey player. He last played for the Tulsa Oilers in the Central Hockey League. He previously played with SG Cortina in the Italian Serie A and after one season with the Tulsa Oilers, Menei initially agreed to a one-year contract with the Sheffield Steelers in the EIHL on June 21, 2013. However a month out from the 2013–14 season, Menei had a change of mind and opted out of his contract to continue for a second season with the Tulsa Oilers. 2020 fantasy football champion*.

== Career statistics ==
			Regular season					Playoffs
Season	Team	League	GP	G	A	Pts	PIM	GP	G	A	Pts	PIM
2003–04	Moose Jaw Warriors	WHL	4	0	0	0	2	—	—	—	—	—
2003–04	Selkirk Steelers	MJHL	46	17	16	33	91	—	—	—	—	—
2004–05	Saskatoon Blades	WHL	68	7	16	23	70	3	0	0	0	6
2005–06	Saskatoon Blades	WHL	38	8	6	14	39	7	1	1	2	10
2006–07	Saskatoon Blades	WHL	71	35	42	77	67	—	—	—	—	—
2006–07	Muskegon Fury	UHL	10	3	2	5	2	9	0	3	3	15
2007–08	Mississippi Sea Wolves	ECHL	71	23	33	56	59	4	0	1	1	0
2008–09	HC Asiago	Italy	14	4	5	9	10	—	—	—	—	—
2008–09	Mississippi Sea Wolves	ECHL	52	12	20	32	27	—	—	—	—	—
2009–10	Johnstown Chiefs	ECHL	24	4	17	21	14	—	—	—	—	—
2009–10	Bakersfield Condors	ECHL	42	14	18	32	25	10	5	3	8	6
2010–11	Rapid City Rush	CHL	66	39	48	87	31	14	3	5	8	4
2011–12	SG Cortina	Italy	41	15	33	48	42	9	3	6	9	8
2012–13	Tulsa Oilers	CHL	66	34	48	82	49	—	—	—	—	—
2013–14	Tulsa Oilers	CHL	49	15	39	54	40	6	2	6	8	2
2017–18	Beechy Bombers	SVHL	11	15	15	30	4	3	2	5	7	16
ECHL totals			189	53	88	141	125	14	5	4	9	6

== Awards and honours ==
- CHL All-Star Game Most Valuable Player (Rapid City) (2010–11)
