= Jason Christie =

Canadian ice hockey player and coach

- Born: April 25, 1969 Gibbons, Alberta, Canada
- Height: 5 ft 8 in (173 cm)
- Weight: 180 lb (82 kg; 12 st 12 lb)
- Position: Right wing
- Shot: Left
- Played for: Hamilton Canucks (AHL); Portland Pirates (AHL)
- NHL draft: Undrafted
- Playing career: 1990–2000

Jason Christie (born April 25, 1969) is a Canadian former professional ice hockey player. He was an assistant coach with the Buffalo Sabres of the National Hockey League until the end of the 2023-24 season.

He was previously the head coach of the Bloomington PrairieThunder in the Central Hockey League (CHL), the Ontario Reign and the Tulsa Oilers of the ECHL. On December 10, 2015, Christie became the winningest head coach in ECHL history when his Tulsa Oilers defeated the Idaho Steelheads 4–2 at home in Tulsa's BOK Center. On June 6, 2017, Christie was named vice president of hockey operations and head coach for the Jacksonville Icemen. After four seasons in Jacksonville, he was hired by the Sabres as an assistant coach.

== Awards and honours ==
- CHL Coach of the Year (2010–11)
- All-ECHL Second Team Coach (2011–12)
