= Mike Vaskivuo =

Finnish-American ice hockey left winger

- Born: March 13, 1986 (age 40) Helsinki, Finland
- Height: 6 ft 1 in (185 cm)
- Weight: 198 lb (90 kg; 14 st 2 lb)
- Position: Left wing
- Shot: Left
- Played for: Brûleurs de Loups; Fort Wayne Komets; Elmira Jackals; Aalborg Pirates; SHC Fassa; Sport; HC Davos; Orlando Solar Bears; Florida Everblades; Nottingham Panthers
- Playing career: 2008–2018

Michael Vaskivuo (born March 13, 1986) is a Finnish-American former ice hockey left winger. He played four games in Liiga for Sport during the 2016–17 season.

== Early life and career ==
Vaskivuo was born in Helsinki, Finland, to a Russian mother and Finnish father, and he grew up in Florida, where the family had moved when he was five years old. He holds both Finnish and American citizenship. He made his professional debut with Hokki of Mestis in 2008 before joining the Dayton Gems of the International Hockey League the following year. On June 8, 2011, Vaskivuo signed for the Jacksonville IceMen, but a month later he was traded to the Rapid City Rush. He was then claimed on waivers by the Fort Wayne Komets on March 14, 2012.

On May 14, 2012, Vaskivuo moved to the Ligue Magnus in France to sign for Grenoble-based team Brûleurs de Loups. He then rejoined the Fort Wayne Komets on August 5, 2013, but would later be traded to the Elmira Jackals on January 6, 2014. In June 2014, Vaskivuo returned to Europe to sign for the Aalborg Pirates of Denmark's Metal Ligaen where he scored 23 goals and 42 points in 36 games. On August 17, 2015, he moved to Italy's Serie A with SHC Fassa and managed 25 goals and 55 points in 40 games.

His performances in Denmark and Italy earned him a contract with Finnish Liiga side Sport in May 2016. He played just four games for Sport without scoring a point before moving to HC Thurgau of the Swiss National League B in October 2016. He also played three games for National League A team HC Davos during their playoff run, scoring a goal and an assist.

Vaskivuo returned to North America and to Florida, signing for the ECHL's Orlando Solar Bears on September 29, 2017. It would ultimately be a brief spell with the Solar Bears, playing just nine games for the team. He followed with brief spell with the ECHL's Florida Everblades for three and Brest Albatros Hockey in the French Division 1 for six games before wrapping up the season in the United Kingdom's Elite Ice Hockey League for the Nottingham Panthers.
