= Simon Watson (ice hockey) =

Canadian ice hockey player and coach

- Born: April 3, 1980 (age 46) Waterloo, Ontario, Canada
- Height: 6 ft 0 in (183 cm)
- Weight: 182 lb (83 kg; 13 st 0 lb)
- Position: Centre
- Shot: Right
- Played for: Missouri Mavericks; Rocky Mountain Rage; Lubbock Cotton Kings
- NHL draft: Undrafted
- Playing career: 2006–2011

Simon Watson (born April 3, 1980) is a Canadian retired ice hockey centre. After retiring as a player, he became a coach.

== Early life ==
Watson was born in Waterloo, Ontario. He played junior hockey with the Waterloo Siskins of the Mid-Western Junior Hockey League and collegiate hockey at St. Lawrence University in Canton, New York.

== Career ==
Watson played professionally in the Central Hockey League (CHL) for the Lubbock Cotton Kings, Rocky Mountain Rage, and finally the Missouri Mavericks. On August 5, 2011, Watson retired as a player and became the Mavericks' assistant director of hockey operations. On May 9, 2013, he was named to the coaching staff of the KC Mavs Elite Midget team.

In July 2014, Missouri Mavericks fans voted Watson the second-greatest Mavericks player in a poll of the Top-10 Mavericks players from the first 5 years of the team's existence.

On April 18, 2018, he continued his association with the Mavericks and was hired as the head coach and general manager of the recently purchased Topeka RoadRunners junior team in the North American Hockey League.

== Awards and honors ==
- In July 2014, voted by Missouri Mavericks fans as the second-greatest Mavericks player from the first five years of the team's existence.
- CHL Man of the Year (2010–11)
