= Andrew Penner =

Canadian ice hockey player

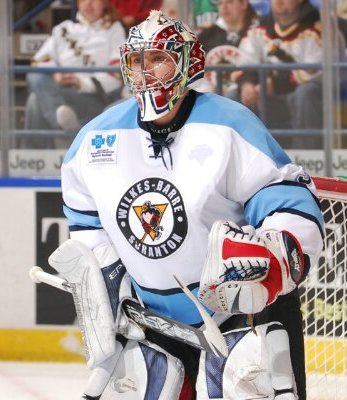
- Penner with the Wilkes-Barre/Scranton Penguins in 2006
- Born: December 21, 1982 (age 43) Simcoe, ONT, CAN
- Height: 6 ft 2 in (188 cm)
- Weight: 223 lb (101 kg; 15 st 13 lb)
- Position: Goaltender
- Caught: Left
- Played for: Dayton Bombers; Johnstown Chiefs; Springfield Falcons; Syracuse Crunch; Wheeling Nailers; W-B/S Penguins; Colorado Eagles
- NHL draft: Undrafted
- Playing career: 2003–2012

Andrew Penner (born December 21, 1982) is a Canadian former professional ice hockey goaltender who last played for the Colorado Eagles of the ECHL.

== Playing career ==
Penner started his career in 1999 with the North Bay Centennials of the Ontario Hockey League. After a slow start, Penner was traded along with North Bay's 4th round choice (Mark Verstegg-Lytwyn) in 2002 OHL Priority Draft for Colt King and Jeremy Day, to the Guelph Storm on November 22, 2001. As a member of the Storm, Penner assumed the role of starting goaltender and led all goaltenders with 18 wins. Penner returned to the Storm for the 2002-03 OHL season, appearing in 51 games and recording 21 wins.

Penner was signed by the Columbus Blue Jackets on September 17, 2001 and was reassigned to Columbus' ECHL affiliate in Dayton in 2003. He led all Bombers goaltenders with 50 appearances and won 15 of the team's 26 games. He split the next two seasons between the Bombers and Columbus' AHL affiliate, the Syracuse Crunch.

Penner signed a one-year contract with the Pittsburgh Penguins on August 18, 2006, splitting time with the Wilkes-Barre/Scranton Penguins and their ECHL affiliate, the Wheeling Nailers. After one season within the Penguins' organization, he was not tendered a qualifying offer and became a free agent at the conclusion of the season He then signed a one-year contract with the Colorado Avalanche, in which he was invited to training camp, but after a short stop in Lake Erie, he was eventually sent to Colorado's ECHL affiliate in Johnstown. Once reassigned Penner assumed a backup role to goaltender Ryan Nie.

Penner became a member of the Colorado Eagles in 2008. He went 30-6-3 in his first year with the Eagles, and led the Eagles to their fourth Governor's Cup in league history, but would eventually lose the President's Cup to the Arizona Sundogs four games to one. Penner was voted by his peers to be the CHL's Best Goaltender in the league's "Best Of The Best" poll. At the start of the 2010-11 CHL season, Penner was the franchise leader in goaltender wins (52), games played (75), and saves (2,074). He also holds the second-longest winning streak in franchise history with 11 wins, with former Eagles goaltender Tyler Weiman holding the record with 13 consecutive wins.

== Personal ==
Penner has been married since the start of the 2009-10 season. Penner's younger brother Alex also played for the Colorado Eagles and had been his teammate since the start of the 2009-10 CHL season. Alex also played for the Johnstown Chiefs, but did not arrive until the 2008-09 ECHL season. Andrew was a member of the Chiefs during the 2007-08 ECHL season.

Alex and Andrew are not related to former NHLer Dustin Penner.

Penner is a commercial photographer, golfer, and golf writer.
