= 2011 Central Hockey League All-Star Game =

2011 CHL All-Star Game
	1	2	3	Total
CHL All-Stars	4	3	4	11
Rapid City Rush	2	3	1	6
- Date: January 12, 2011
- Arena: Rushmore Plaza Civic Center
- City: Rapid City, South Dakota
- Attendance: 5,009

The 2011 Central Hockey League All-Star Game was on January 12, 2011 at the Rushmore Plaza Civic Center in Rapid City, South Dakota, home of the Rapid City Rush, in the 2010–11 CHL season.

The game was held between the defending champions Rapid City Rush and was opposed by a team of CHL All-Stars composed of players from the other 17 CHL member teams.

The CHL All-Stars were selected from voting done by CHL head coaches, CHL Communication's Departments and select media members from CHL cities. The All-Star Team co-coaches Dwight Mullins and Scott Hillman selected the reserves in conjunction with the CHL Hockey Operations Department.
