= Bloomington PrairieThunder =

- City: Bloomington, Illinois, United States
- League: UHL/IHL (2006–2010); CHL (2010–2011)
- Conference: Turner
- Founded: 2006
- Home arena: U.S. Cellular Coliseum
- Colors: Blue, gold, silver, white
- Owner: Tim Leighton
- General manager: Jim Riggs
- Head coach: Jason Christie
- Captain: Jon Booras
- Media: WJBC-FM (93.7 FM)

Franchise history
- 2006–2011: Bloomington PrairieThunder

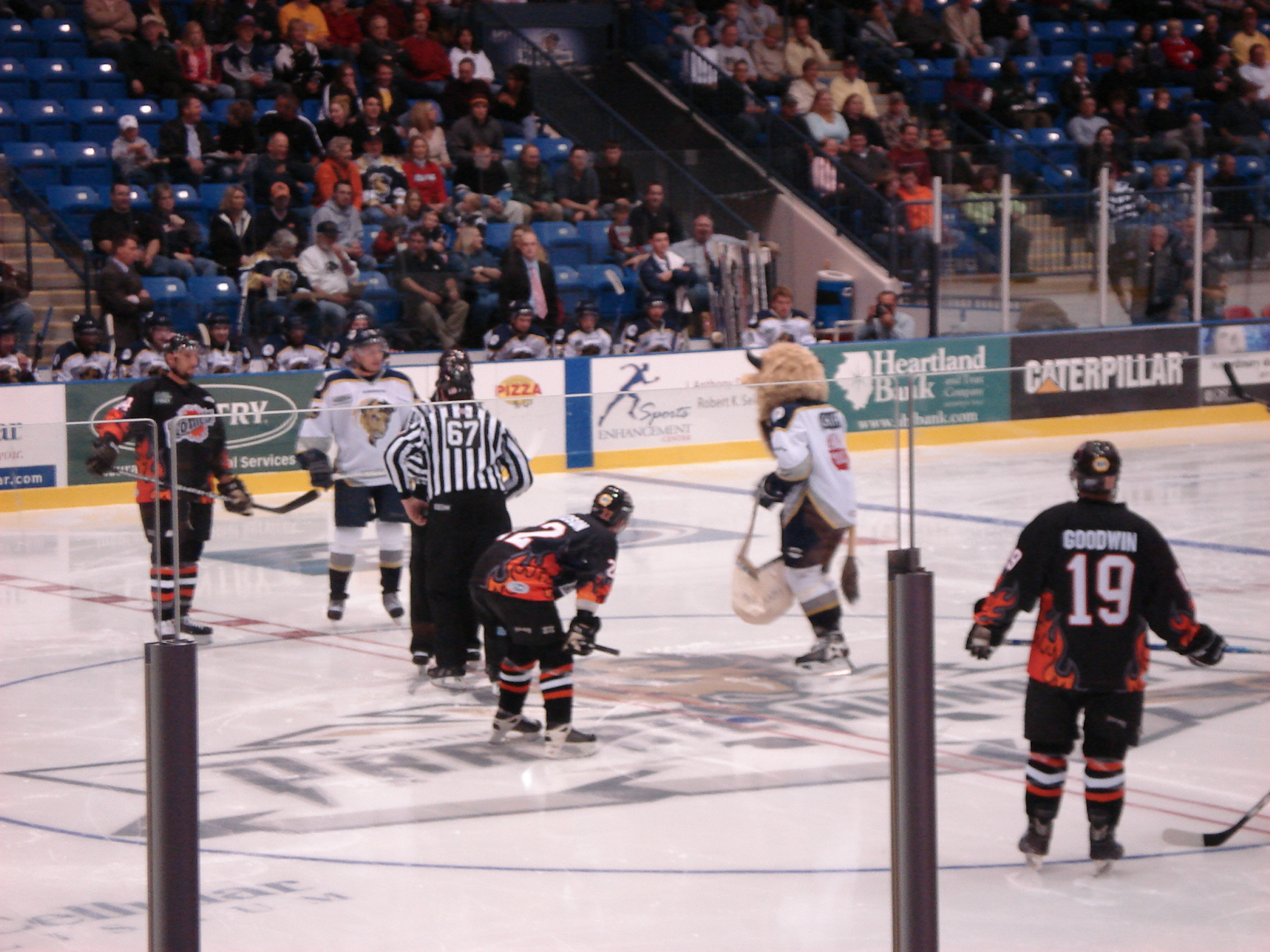
Inaugural home opener (10/14/2006)

The Bloomington PrairieThunder were a minor professional ice hockey team based in Bloomington, Illinois. They were a member of the Central Hockey League in the Turner Conference. The team was originally a member of the United Hockey League (later known as the International Hockey League) prior to its merger into the CHL in 2010. They played their home games at the U.S. Cellular Coliseum.

== History ==
On September 12, 1999, John Butler and Mike Nelson, both of Bloomington, began formulating a plan to bring a minor league hockey team to Central Illinois. On August 18, 2004, ground was broken for the $37-million U.S. Cellular Coliseum, the arena that would become the home of the PrairieThunder. On September 20, 2005, the United Hockey League (UHL) awarded Butler and Nelson a membership to obtain a franchise.

On February 1, 2006, a contest was announced to name the new hockey franchise and on February 23, 2006, the official name was announced. "PrairieThunder" refers to a train called "Prairie Thunder" that passed through Bloomington in its early history. On July 20, 2006, the PrairieThunder unveiled their team logo, which featured a charging bison smashing its hooves into a sheet of ice. The team's colors were navy, silver, old gold, and white.

- October 13, 2006: the PrairieThunder played their first game in franchise history, against the Muskegon Lumberjacks. They lost the contest 7–3.
- October 14, 2006: the PrairieThunder played their first home game at the U.S. Cellular Coliseum against the Fort Wayne Komets. This was also the PrairieThunder's first regular season victory, as they won the contest 4–2 before a crowd of 5,102. Andre Neic scored the first goal at the US Cellular Coliseum, at 4:20 of the first period.
- February 17, 2007: Trevor Baker records the first hat trick in franchise history.
- January 27, 2007: Largest crowd in team history in attendance to see Lucas Horn, 5,488 (as of March 26, 2009)
- January 12, 2008: Rookie goalie Loic Lacasse posts first shutout in franchise history in 2–0 win over Port Huron at U.S. Cellular Coliseum.
- April 5, 2008: The PrairieThunder establish a professional hockey league record at all levels by scoring four goals in a 35-second span, during the first period in a 9–4 win at Flint. Scoring the goals were Jon Booras, John Nail, Neil Clark, and Brett Holmberg. The team was then featured in the April 21, 2008, edition of Sports Illustrated for the accomplishment.
- July 12, 2008: PrairieThunder defenseman Rob Guinn was killed in auto accident in Iowa. This led the team to honor him on their jerseys and the ice during the 2008–09 season.
- December 27, 2008: PrairieThunder center Don Parsons breaks the minor league career goals scored record by an American player with his 678th, passing Flint General Kevin Kerr.
- December 3, 2009: PrairieThunder re-sign Erie Otters forward Michael Liambas following his suspension from the OHL for severely injuring Kitchener Rangers defenceman Ben Fanelli.
- June 1, 2010: The IHL makes major announcement that the IHL will merge with the Central Hockey League for the 2010–2011 season along with four other teams from the IHL (Fort Wayne Komets, Quad City Mallards, Evansville IceMen, Dayton Gems).
- April 28, 2011: After the PrairieThunder was swept in the first round of the Central Hockey League playoffs, team owner Tim Leighton failed to contact the U.S. Cellular Coliseum for a lease extension after their five-year lease ended.
- May 23, 2011: East Coast investors Gary DelBuono and Sandra Hunnewell were approved of a new CHL expansion franchise to play in Bloomington for the 2011–12 season. They also announced that former PrairieThunder players would play for the new Bloomington CHL franchise. Former PrairieThunder general manager Jim Riggs would also be the GM of the new CHL franchise in Bloomington, the Bloomington Blaze.

== Season-by-season records ==
Season	GP	W	L	OTL	SOL	Pts	GF	GA	PIM	Standing	Playoffs
2006–07	76	25	45	—	6	56	201	285	1392	5th, West	Did not qualify
2007–08	76	31	38	3	4	69	210	258	1711	6th	Did not qualify
2008–09	76	29	40	2	5	65	235	291	1418	5th	Did not qualify
2009–10	76	31	34	5	6	73	241	273	1864	5th	Did not qualify
2010–11	66	37	22	7	—	81	188	189	1212	3rd, Turner Conference	Lost in First Round

== Mascot ==
Chip the Buffalo at the U.S. Cellular Coliseum (October 4, 2006)

The team held a name-the-mascot contest, sponsored by the Bloomington Pantagraph, to find a name for the mascot. Megan Fish, a 12-year-old sixth-grader at Chiddix Junior High School, was the first of 12 individuals to submit the name Chip. The next most popular entry was "Boomer", which had seven submissions. Chip the Buffalo made his first public appearance at the open house and public scrimmage held by the PrairieThunder on October 4, 2006, interacting with fans and signing autographs.
