= Dayton Gems (2009–2012) =

- City: Dayton, Ohio
- League: Central Hockey League
- Conference: Turner
- Founded: 2009
- Folded: 2012
- Home arena: Hara Arena
- Colors: Blue, red, white
- Owners: GDHP, LLC (Rob Garfield, Kathy Rupp & Dr. Paul Nitz)

Franchise history
- 2009–2010: Dayton Gems (IHL)
- 2010–2012: Dayton Gems (CHL)

The Dayton Gems were a minor professional ice hockey team based in Dayton, Ohio, in the Central Hockey League. The team was originally a member of the International Hockey League before it merged into the CHL in 2010. The team played their home games at the Hara Arena in nearby Trotwood.

== History ==
The team was established in 2009 and joined the International Hockey League (IHL) for the 2009–10 season. The team was named after the original Dayton Gems of the former International Hockey League. Their acceptance into the IHL was officially announced on June 9, 2009. On June 15, 2009, the Gems named John Marks as head coach.

On December 2, 2009, the IHL Board of Governors announced that it had terminated the ownership group of the Dayton Gems and had taken ownership of the team while new local ownership group is pursued. The Dayton Gems were taken over by a local ownership group GDHP, LLC, led by Rob Garfield, in January 2010. The other two owners were Kathy Rupp and Dr. Paul Nitz. On April 23, the Gems owners announced that John Marks was fired as head coach after one season.

On June 1, 2010, the International Hockey League announced that they were joining the Central Hockey League (CHL). On July 7, the Gems announced that Brian Gratz would be the new head coach and general manager. On July 19, the 2010–11 Dayton Gems jerseys were revealed after they were voted on by the fans, as well as the first ten players signed for the season.

On May 17, 2012, the Dayton Gems ceased operations. The Gems were replaced by the Dayton Demonz of the Federal Hockey League for the 2012–13 season.

== Season records ==
Season	GP	W	L	OTL	PTS	GF	GA	PIM	Finish
International Hockey League
2009–10	76	25	46	5	55	200	267	1106	7th of 7 in the IHL
Central Hockey League
2010–11	66	32	29	5	69	201	200	1102	8th of 9, Turner Conference
2011–12	66	23	29	14	60	185	228	958	6th of 7, Turner Conference

== Playoff record ==
Season	GP	W	L	OTL	GF	GA	PIM	Finish
International Hockey League
2009–10	0	0	0	0	0	0	0	Did not qualify
Central Hockey League
2010–11	3	0	3	0	8	12	28	Lost in 1st Round
2011–12	0	0	0	0	0	0	0	Did not qualify
