= 2010–11 CHL season =

- League: Central Hockey League
- Sport: Ice hockey
- Duration: 66 games
- Teams: 18

Regular season
- Governor's Cup: Allen Americans
- Season MVP: Sebastien Thinel (Odessa)
- Top scorer: Riley Nelson (Colorado)

Finals
- Champions: Bossier-Shreveport Mudbugs
- Runners-up: Colorado Eagles

CHL seasons
- 2009–10 2011–12

The 2010–11 CHL season was the 19th season of the Central Hockey League (CHL).

== League business ==
=== Team foldings ===
The Amarillo Gorillas and the Corpus Christi IceRays folded and both were replaced by a North American Hockey League team.

=== Expansion ===
On June 1, 2010, the Central Hockey League (CHL) and the International Hockey League (IHL) announced that they would merge and play under the CHL moniker.

On June 10, 2010, it was announced that four IHL teams made the move to the CHL, the Fort Wayne Komets, Bloomington PrairieThunder, Dayton Gems and the Quad City Mallards. It was later announced that the Evansville IceMen would also participate in the league. This is after team ownership in Evansville, Indiana purchased the former IHL Muskegon Lumberjacks franchise.

=== League realignment ===
==== Turner Conference ====
- Bloomington PrairieThunder
- Colorado Eagles
- Dayton Gems
- Evansville IceMen
- Fort Wayne Komets
- Missouri Mavericks
- Quad City Mallards
- Rapid City Rush
- Wichita Thunder

==== Berry Conference ====
- Allen Americans
- Arizona Sundogs
- Bossier-Shreveport Mudbugs
- Laredo Bucks
- Mississippi RiverKings
- Odessa Jackalopes
- Rio Grande Valley Killer Bees
- Texas Brahmas
- Tulsa Oilers

=== All-Star Game ===
It was announced that the 2011 Central Hockey League All-Star Game would be held at the Rushmore Plaza Civic Center, home of the Rapid City Rush on January 12, 2011. The defending champions Rapid City Rush and coach Joe Ferras will form one team in the match-up and will be opposed by a team of CHL All-Stars composed of players from the other 17 CHL member teams.

== Teams ==
2010-11 Central Hockey League
Conference	Team	City	Arena
Turner	Bloomington PrairieThunder	Bloomington, Illinois	U.S. Cellular Coliseum
Turner	Colorado Eagles	Loveland, Colorado	Budweiser Events Center
Turner	Dayton Gems	Dayton, Ohio	Hara Arena
Turner	Evansville Icemen	Evansville, Indiana	Ford Center
Turner	Fort Wayne Komets	Fort Wayne, Indiana	Allen County War Memorial Coliseum
Turner	Missouri Mavericks	Independence, Missouri	Independence Events Center
Turner	Quad City Mallards	Moline, Illinois	iWireless Center
Turner	Rapid City Rush	Rapid City, South Dakota	Rushmore Plaza Civic Center
Turner	Wichita Thunder	Wichita, Kansas	Intrust Bank Arena
Berry	Allen Americans	Allen, Texas	Allen Event Center
Berry	Arizona Sundogs	Prescott Valley, Arizona	Tim's Toyota Center
Berry	Bossier-Shreveport Mudbugs	Bossier City, Louisiana	CenturyLink Center
Berry	Laredo Bucks	Laredo, Texas	Laredo Entertainment Center
Berry	Mississippi RiverKings	Southaven, Mississippi	DeSoto Civic Center
Berry	Odessa Jackalopes	Odessa, Texas	Ector County Coliseum
Berry	Rio Grande Valley Killer Bees	Hidalgo, Texas	State Farm Arena
Berry	Texas Brahmas	North Richland Hills, Texas	NYTEX Sports Centre
Berry	Tulsa Oilers	Tulsa, Oklahoma	BOK Center

== Map of teams ==
Turner Conference Berry Conference

== Regular season ==
=== Conference standings ===
Turner Conference	GP	W	L	OTL	GF	GA	Pts
y-Rapid City Rush	66	40	22	4	210	200	84
x-Colorado Eagles	66	40	22	4	250	199	84
x-Bloomington PrairieThunder	66	37	22	7	188	189	81
x-Missouri Mavericks	66	37	23	6	213	173	80
x-Wichita Thunder	66	34	26	6	249	231	74
x-Fort Wayne Komets	66	31	27	8	187	204	70
x-Quad City Mallards	66	34	31	1	186	182	69
x-Dayton Gems	66	32	29	5	201	200	69
Evansville IceMen	66	21	32	13	181	242	55

x – Qualified for playoffs; y – Won division; z – Won regular season league title After games of March 27, 2011

Berry Conference	GP	W	L	OTL	GF	GA	Pts
z-Allen Americans	66	47	16	3	271	211	97
x-Bossier-Shreveport Mudbugs	66	37	26	3	229	193	77
x-Tulsa Oilers	66	35	25	6	242	234	76
x-Texas Brahmas	66	34	27	5	227	228	73
x-Odessa Jackalopes	66	31	28	7	241	238	69
x-Mississippi RiverKings	66	30	31	5	199	229	65
x-Arizona Sundogs	66	25	31	10	204	253	60
x-Rio Grande Valley Killer Bees	66	25	35	6	194	232	56
Laredo Bucks	66	24	34	8	194	228	56

x – Qualified for playoffs; y – Won division; z – Won regular season league title After games of March 27, 2011.

== Playoffs ==
=== Playoff Bracket ===
Conference Opening Round	Conference Semi-final
1	Rapid City	3
8	Dayton	0
1	Rapid City	3
6	Fort Wayne	2
3	Bloomington	0
6	Fort Wayne	3
Turner Conference
2	Colorado	3
7	Quad City	1
3	Colorado	3
4	Missouri	1
4	Missouri	3
5	Wichita	2
1	Allen	3
8	Rio Grande Valley	0
1	Allen	3
5	Odessa	2
4	Texas	1
5	Odessa	3
Berry Conference
2	Bossier-Shreveport	3
7	Arizona	1
2	Bossier-Shreveport	3
3	Tulsa	2
3	Tulsa	3
6	Mississippi	2

Conference Final
1	Rapid City	3
2	Colorado	4
1	Allen	1
2	Bossier-Shreveport	4

Ray Miron President's Cup Finals
T2	Colorado	3
B2	Bossier-Shreveport	4

== Awards ==
Source:Central Hockey League Historical Award Winners

- Ray Miron President's Cup (Playoff Champions) - Bossier-Shreveport Mudbugs
- Bud Poile Governors' Cup (regular-season champions) - Allen Americans
- Most Valuable Player - Riley Nelson, Colorado
- Most Outstanding Goaltender - Robby Nolan, Missouri
- Most Outstanding Defenseman - Andrew Martens, Wichita
- Rookie of the Year - Aaron Lewicki, Rio Grande Valley
- Coach of the Year - Jason Christie, Bloomington
- Man of the Year - Simon Watson, Missouri
- Rick Kozuback Award - Jeff Christian, Evansville
- Joe Burton Award (Scoring Champion) - Sebastien Thine, Odessa
- Playoff Most Valuable Player - Jeff Kyrzakos, Bossier-Shreveport
- All-Star Game Most Valuable Player (Rapid City) - Ryan Menei, Rapid City
- All-Star Game Most Valuable Player (CHL All-Stars) - Jason Dale, Bloomington
- Athletic Trainer of the Year – George Bullock Jr., Bossier-Shreveport
- Equipment Manager of the Year– Romeo Vivit, Rapid City

=== 2010-2011 All-CHL Team ===
- Forward: Sebastien Thinel, Odessa
- Forward: Riley Nelson, Colorado
- Forward: Chad Woollard, Texas
- Defenceman: Darcy Campbell, Rio Grande Valley
- Defenceman: Andrew Martens, Wichita
- Goaltender : Robby Nolan, Missouri

=== 2010-2011 CHL All-Rookie Team ===
- Forward - Aaron Lewicki, Rio Grande Valley
- Forward - Adam Chorneyko, Colorado
- Forward - Gary Steffes, Tulsa
- Defenceman - David Strathman, Allen
- Defenceman - Alan Mazur, Bloomington
- Goaltender - Wayne Savage, Texas
