= 2013–14 Missouri Mavericks season =

American ice hockey team season

2013–14 Missouri Mavericks
- League: 1st CHL
- Conference: Berry
- 2013–14 record: 44–20–2
- Home record: 21–10–2
- Road record: 23–10–0
- Goals for: 238
- Goals against: 184

Team information
- Coach: Scott Hillman
- Captain: Sebastien Thinel
- Alternate captains: Dave Pszenyczny, Colt King
- Arena: Independence Events Center
- Average attendance: 5,499 (1st in Central Hockey League)

Team leaders
- Goals: Andrew Courtney (34)
- Assists: Sebastien Thinel (71)
- Points: Sebastien Thinel (94)
- Penalty minutes: Dave Pszenyczny (166)
- Plus/minus: Colten Hayes (+31)
- Wins: Shane Owen (35)
- Goals against average: Joe Howe (2.52)

The 2013–14 Missouri Mavericks season is the fifth season of the Central Hockey League (CHL) franchise in Independence, Missouri, a suburb of Kansas City, Missouri.

== Off-season ==
On July 11, 2013, the Mavericks announced the renewal of their affiliation agreement with the Chicago Wolves of the American Hockey League.

== Regular season ==
On February 8, 2014, claim solo first place in the 2013–14 Central Hockey League Regular Season standings with a 6-3 win over the Allen Americans and a loss by the Rapid City Rush to the Denver Cutthroats On March 5, 2014, after a 5–2 win against the Quad City Mallards, the Mavericks were the first team in the Central Hockey League to clinch a berth in the 2013–14 Central Hockey League Playoffs. On March 25, 2014, after an 8–0 victory over the St. Charles Chill, the Mavericks, for the first time in team history, won the 2013–14 Governor's Cup for the best regular season record in the Central Hockey League.

Team	GP	W	L	OTL	GF	GA	Pts
y-Missouri Mavericks	66	44	20	2	238	184	90
x-Denver Cutthroats	66	38	17	11	214	194	87
x-Allen Americans	66	39	22	5	249	214	83
x-Rapid City Rush	66	39	23	4	220	189	82
x-Quad City Mallards	66	33	23	10	219	198	76
x-Brampton Beast	66	33	26	7	209	226	73
x-Tulsa Oilers	66	34	29	3	225	215	71
x-Arizona Sundogs	66	32	27	7	197	204	71
Wichita Thunder	66	27	30	9	201	223	63
St. Charles Chill	66	11	49	6	156	281	28

y- Won Governor's Cup
x- Advanced to playoffs

== Playoffs ==
On April 15, 2013, the #1-seeded Mavericks' 2013–14 season ended with a 4–3 Double Overtime loss to the #8-seeded Arizona Sundogs at home in Independence in Game 6 of the Ray Miron President's Cup Playoffs Opening round. This series loss was the first time the Mavericks have been eliminated from the playoffs by a lower-seeded team.

2013 Central Hockey League Ray Miron President's Cup Playoffs

2013–14 Ray Miron President's Cup Playoffs Opening Round vs. #8 Arizona Sundogs (Best-of-Seven Series) (Home: 1–2; Road: 1–2)
#	Date	Opponent	Score	OT	Decision	Series
1	April 4, 2014	Arizona Sundogs	5–3		Shane Owen	1–0
2	April 6, 2014	Arizona Sundogs	4–3		Andrew Engelage	1–1
3	April 9, 2014	@ Arizona Sundogs	3–1		Andrew Engelage	1–2
4	April 11, 2014	@ Arizona Sundogs	3–1		Shane Owen	2–2
5	April 12, 2014	@ Arizona Sundogs	4–3	2OT	Andrew Engelage	2–3
6	April 15, 2014	Arizona Sundogs	4–3	2OT	Andrew Engelage	4–2

== Awards, records, and milestones ==
Player/Team	Award/Record
Missouri Mavericks	On February 8, 2014, claim solo first place in the 2013-14 Central Hockey League Regular Season standings with a 6-3 win over the Allen Americans and a loss by the Rapid City Rush to the Denver Cutthroats; After a 5-2 win against the Quad City Mallards on March 5, 2014, the Mavericks were the first team in the Central Hockey League to clinch a berth in the 2013-14 Central Hockey League Playoffs.; After an 8-0 victory over the St. Charles Chill on March 25, 2014, the Mavericks, for the first time in team history, won the 2013–14 Governor's Cup for the best regular season record in the Central Hockey League.; 2013-14 Central Hockey League Franchise of The Year; Central Hockey League 2013–14 Season "Best of The Best" Poll: 1st Place: Best Mascot ("Mac"); Best On-Ice Promotions; Best Fans; Toughest Building to Win In (Independence Events Center); Best Team Website; 2nd Place: Best Game Notes; Best Use of Social Media; 3rd Place: Best Training/Equipment Staff; Most Skilled Team; Best Arena (Independence Events Center); Best Team Uniforms (Overall); Best Arena Music (Independence Events Center); Best City (Independence, Missouri); Best Booster Club
Shane Owen	2013-14 Season Central Hockey League All-CHL Team; Central Hockey League 2013-14 Season "Best of The Best" Poll: 3rd Place: Best Goaltender in Shootouts; CHL Oakley Goaltender of The Week (Week prior to November 5, 2013); CHL Oakley Goaltender of The Week (Week prior to November 12, 2013); Oakley Central Hockey League Goaltender of The Week (Week prior to December 23, 2013); Oakley Central Hockey League Goaltender of The Week (Week ended December 31, 2013); Warrior Central Hockey League Goaltender of The Month (December 2013)
Dave Pszenyczny	Oakley Central Hockey League Player of The Week (Week prior to December 23, 2013)
Henrik Ødegaard	2013-14 Season Central Hockey League All-Rookie Team; Named to Norway men's national ice hockey team for the 2014 Winter Olympics
Sebastien Thinel	On February 14, 2014, Thinel scores in 300th goal in the Central Hockey League, becoming only the 6th player in league history to score 300 goals.; During a 5-2 win against the Quad City Mallards on March 5, 2014, Thinel became only the third player in Central Hockey League history to score 900 career Points in the Central Hockey League.; In a game against the Brampton Beast on March 16, 2014, Thinel climbed to second place on the All-Time Central Hockey League Assist list with 602 Assists.; Central Hockey League 2013-14 Season "Best of The Best" Poll: 1st Place: Best Playmaker; Best Shooter in Shootouts; 2nd Place: Best on Power Play; 3rd Place: Best Overall Player; Most Valuable to His Team
Scott Hillman	In a 4-3 win against the St. Charles Chill on January 30, 2014, Hillman coached in his 300th Central Hockey League Game.; Central Hockey League 2013-14 Season "Best of The Best" Poll: 2nd Place: Best Coach
Éric Castonguay	In a game against the Quad City Mallards on March 23, 2014, Castonguay set a Mavericks single-season franchise record of 31 Goals, which itself would ultimately be broken later that same season by Andrew Courtney, who ended the season with 34 Goals.; Central Hockey League 2013-14 Season "Best of The Best" Poll: 2nd Place: Most Gentlemanly Player
Trevor Kell	Central Hockey League 2013-14 Season "Best of The Best" Poll: 2nd Place: Most Underrated Player; 3rd Place: Best Defensive Forward
John-Scott Dickson	Central Hockey League 2013-14 Season "Best of The Best" Poll: 1st Place: Best Penalty Killer
Evan Vossen	Central Hockey League 2013-14 Season "Best of The Best" Poll: 3rd Place: Best Penalty Killer
Matt Stephenson	2013-14 Season Central Hockey League All-CHL Team; Central Hockey League 2013-14 Season "Best of The Best" Poll: 1st Place: Best Defensive Defenseman
Colt King	Central Hockey League 2013-14 Season "Best of The Best" Poll: 1st Place: Best Fighter (Heavyweight); Best Power Forward; 2nd Place: Best Bodychecker
Andrew Courtney	Set the Mavericks's single-season team record for Goals, ending the season with 34 of them.; Central Hockey League 2013-14 Season "Best of The Best" Poll: 2nd Place: Best Power Forward
Mike Ramsay	Central Hockey League 2013-14 Season "Best of The Best" Poll: 1st Place: Most Gentlemanly Player
Steve Garrett	Central Hockey League 2013-14 Season "Best of The Best" Poll: 1st Place: Best PA Announcer
Bill Murray (Team Trainer)	During a game against the Quad City Mallards on February 26, 2014, Murray, in spite of being a non-player, was ejected from the game on the basis of "Obscene Language" and "Game Misconduct" and was assessed 38 Penalty Minutes in the process.

== Transactions ==
=== Player signings and acquisitions off of waivers ===
Player	Former team	Date
Sebastien Thinel	Re-Signed	June 13, 2013
John-Scott Dickson	Re-Signed	June 13, 2013
Dave Pszenyczny	Re-Signed	June 13, 2013
Andrew Courtney	Re-Signed	June 13, 2013
Colt King	Re-Signed	July 18, 2013
Evan Vossen	Re-Signed	July 18, 2013
Kyle Hood	Re-Signed	August 1, 2013
Trevor Kell	Re-Signed	August 1, 2013
Mike Ramsay	Sparta Sarpsborg	August 6, 2013
Shane Owen	Utah Grizzlies	August 6, 2013
Colten Hayes	Stockton Thunder	August 13, 2013
Matt Stephenson	Sheffield Steelers	August 13, 2013
Tyler Currier	The University of Alaska Anchorage	August 23, 2013
Anders Franzon	The University of Vermont	August 23, 2013
Joe Howe	Idaho Steelheads	September 12, 2013
Erno Suomalainen	Sport	September 12, 2013
Rob Kleebaum	Las Vegas Wranglers	September 12, 2013
Éric Castonguay	Dragons de Rouen	September 21, 2013
Shawn Courtney	Adrian College	September 21, 2013
Joseph Harcharik	Mississippi Surge	October 2, 2013
Devin Mantha	University of Wisconsin–Eau Claire	October 2, 2013
Christian Fosse	Ringerike IHK	October 2, 2013
Michal Pastor	Topeka RoadRunners	October 2, 2013
Saverio Posa	Chicago Wolves	October 3, 2013
Cody Crichton	Chicago Wolves	October 3, 2013
Obi Aduba	Quad City Mallards	October 25, 2013
Erno Suomalainen	Missouri Mavericks	December 18, 2013
Brandon Smith	Missouri Mavericks	December 31, 2013
Evan Zych	Dordrecht Lions	January 19, 2014
Bobby Andrews	Missouri Mavericks	January 31, 2014
Jeff Buvinow	Arizona Sundogs	February 2, 2014
Pete Massar	The University of Vermont	April 12, 2014

=== Free agency loses, waivers and retirements ===
Player	Free Agency Loss (New Team)/Waived (New Team)/Placed on Team Suspension (New Team)/Retired	Date
Kellan Tochkin	Rejoined Parent Club (Vancouver Canucks)	End of 2012-13 season
Brandon Smith	Free Agent	End of 2012-13 season
Blake Forsyth	Free Agent	End of 2012-13 season
Jesse Perrin	Free Agent (Bentley Generals)	End of 2012-13 season
Joshua Hepditch	Free Agent	End of 2012-13 season
Mike Clemente	Rejoined Parent Club (Springfield Falcons)	End of 2012-13 season
J.P. Testwuide	Free Agent	End of 2012-13 season
David Simoes	Retirement	March 22, 2013
Evan Zych	Free Agent (Dordrecht Lions)	June 5, 2013
Mathieu Corbeil	Free Agent (Utica Comets)	July 18, 2013
Eric Meland	Free Agent (HC ’05 Banská Bystrica)	July 31, 2013
Ryan Jardine	Free Agent (Cornwall River Kings)	August 1, 2013
Riley Emmerson	Free Agent (St. Charles Chill)	September 17, 2013
Kenton Miller	Free Agent (Utah Grizzlies)	September 19, 2013
Devin Mantha	Released (Mississippi RiverKings)	October 2, 2013
Joseph Harcharik	Released (Crocodiles Hamburg)	October 9, 2013
Michal Pastor	Released (HK Dukla Michalovce)	October 10, 2013
Christian Fosse	Released (Ringerike IHK)	October 14, 2013
Shawn Courtney	Released	October 14, 2013
Erno Suomalainen	Waived	October 25, 2013
Joe Howe	Placed on Team Suspension (Cincinnati Cyclones)	December 16, 2013
Brandon Smith	Waived	January 7, 2014
Bobby Andrews	Waived	February 2, 2014
Evan Zych	Waived (Mississippi Surge)	February 11, 2014

=== Transfers and on loan players ===
Player	To/From	Affiliate Team	Date
Shane Owen	to	Chicago Wolves	August 6, 2013
Colten Hayes	to	Chicago Wolves	September 25, 2013
Anders Franzon	to	Chicago Wolves	September 25, 2013
Henrik Ødegaard	from	Chicago Wolves	October 10, 2013
Shane Owen	from	Chicago Wolves	
Colten Hayes	from	Chicago Wolves	
Anders Franzon	from	Chicago Wolves	
Dean Moore	from	Mississippi Surge	January 25, 2014
Dean Moore	to	Mississippi Surge	February 5, 2014
Henrik Ødegaard	to	Chicago Wolves	April 18, 2014
Éric Castonguay	to	Chicago Wolves	April 18, 2014

=== Player suspensions or placed on leave ===
Player	Team Suspension (New Team, If Applicable)/League Suspension (Number of Games)/Granted Leave to Join National Team	Date Placed on Suspension/Granted Leave	Date Activated from Suspension/Returned from Leave
Dave Pszenyczny	League Suspension (3 games)	October 29, 2013	November 3, 2013
Colt King	League Suspension (3 games)	October 29, 2013	November 3, 2013
Dave Pszenyczny	League Suspension (3 games)	November 16, 2013	November 23, 2013
Andrew Courtney	League Suspension (2 games)	November 30, 2013	December 6, 2013
Colt King	League Suspension (7 games)	December 12, 2013	December 29, 2013
Saverio Posa	Team Suspension (Player Left Team to Continue Education)	December 23, 2013	
Kyle Hood	Team Suspension (Player Left Team to Start Career Outside of Hockey)	December 23, 2013	
Henrik Ødegaard	Granted Leave to Join National Team (Norway)	December 16, 2013	December 26, 2013
Matt Stephenson	League Suspension (1 game)	January 11, 2014	January 14, 2014
Dave Pszenyczny	League Suspension (3 games)	January 19, 2014	January 26, 2014
Henrik Ødegaard	Granted leave by league to join Norway for the 2014 Winter Olympics	February 2, 2014	February 24, 2014
Andrew Courtney	League Suspension (2 games)	February 11, 2014	February 15, 2014
Mike Ramsay	Granted leave by league	February 28, 2014	March 4, 2014
Jeff Buvinow	Granted leave by league	March 14, 2014	March 16, 2014
Henrik Ødegaard	Granted leave by league	March 25, 2014	March 28, 2014
Sebastien Thinel	League Suspension (1 game)	April 12, 2014	April 13, 2014

=== Injured reserve ===
Player	Date Placed on Injured Reserve	Date Activated from Injured Reserve
Tyler Currier	October 18, 2013	November 27, 2013
Colten Hayes	October 25, 2013	November 2, 2013
Kyle Hood	November 1, 2013	November 9, 2013
Evan Vossen	November 8, 2013	November 15, 2013
Rob Kleebaum	November 9, 2013	November 16, 2013
Kyle Hood	November 19, 2013	December 5, 2013
Rob Kleebaum	November 23, 2013	November 30, 2013
Tyler Currier	November 27, 2013	December 26, 2013
Kyle Hood	December 6, 2013	December 14, 2013
Éric Castonguay	December 13, 2013	December 20, 2013
Evan Zych	January 19, 2014	February 7, 2014
John-Scott Dickson	January 24, 2014	February 9, 2014
Rob Kleebaum	February 21, 2014	February 28, 2014
Jeff Buvinow	February 24, 2014	March 11, 2014
Tyler Currier	March 1, 2014	March 11, 2014
Colten Hayes	March 5, 2014	March 21, 2014
Rob Kleebaum	March 7, 2014	March 14, 2014
Tyler Currier	March 14, 2014	March 21, 2014
Rob Kleebaum	March 16, 2014	March 30, 2014
Mathieu Gagnon	March 16, 2014	March 25, 2014
John-Scott Dickson	March 23, 2014	ca. April 4, 2014
Sebastien Thinel	March 29, 2014	ca. April 4, 2014

== Roster at the end of the 2013-14 season ==
As of April 13, 2014.

No.	Nat	Player	Pos	S/G	Age	Acquired	Birthplace	Contract
21	(United States)	Obi Aduba	F	L	42	2013	Walpole, Massachusetts	Mavericks
8	(United States)	Jeff Buvinow	D	R	36	2014	Turnersville, New Jersey	Mavericks
7	(Canada)	Éric Castonguay	F	L	38	2013	Drummondville, Quebec	Mavericks
27	(Canada)	Andrew Courtney	F	R	41	2011	Belleville, Ontario	Mavericks
16	(United States)	Tyler Currier	F	R	38	2013	Anchorage, Alaska	Mavericks
40	(Canada)	John-Scott Dickson	LW	R	42	2011	North York, Ontario	Mavericks
2	(United States)	Anders Franzon	D	R	37	2013	Plattsburgh, New York	Mavericks
10	(Canada)	Mathieu Gagnon	D	L	33	2014	Gatineau, Quebec	Mavericks
44	(Canada)	Colten Hayes	D	R	36	2013	Maple Ridge, British Columbia	Mavericks
9	(Canada)	Trevor Kell	RW	R	40	2013	Thunder Bay, Ontario	Mavericks
45	(Canada)	Colt King (A)	F	L	43	2012	Calgary, Alberta	Mavericks
37	(Canada)	Rob Kleebaum	F	L	36	2013	Sherwood Park, Alberta	Mavericks
29	(United States)	Pete Massar	F	R	37	2014	Williston, Vermont	Mavericks
42	(Norway)	Henrik Ødegaard	D	L	38	2013	Asker, Norway	Wolves
50	(Canada)	Shane Owen	G	L	36	2013	Shanty Bay, Ontario	Mavericks
5	(United States)	Dave Pszenyczny (A)	D	L	41	2011	Sterling Heights, Michigan	Mavericks
19	(Canada)	Mike Ramsay	F	R	41	2013	Newmarket, Ontario	Mavericks
24	(Canada)	Matt Stephenson	D	R	42	2013	Midland, Ontario	Mavericks
32	(Finland)	Erno Suomalainen	G	L	35	2013	Espoo, Finland	Mavericks
43	(Canada)	Sebastien Thinel (C)	RW	L	45	2011	St. Jerome, Quebec	Mavericks
12	(Canada)	Evan Vossen	F	L	39	2012	Swift Current, Saskatchewan	Mavericks

== See also ==
- 2013–14 CHL season
