= 2012–13 Missouri Mavericks season =

Hockey season

2012–13 Missouri Mavericks
- League: T-5th Central Hockey League
- Conference: Berry
- 2012–13 record: 35-25-6
- Home record: 19-12-2
- Road record: 16-13-4
- Goals for: 217
- Goals against: 222

Team information
- General manager: Brent Thiessen
- Coach: Scott Hillman
- Captain: Sebastien Thinel
- Alternate captains: Ryan Jardine, Dave Pszenyczny, David Simoes
- Arena: Independence Events Center
- Average attendance: 5,522

Team leaders
- Goals: Kenton Miller (30)
- Assists: Sebastien Thinel (67)
- Points: Sebastien Thinel (96)
- Penalty minutes: Dave Pszenyczny (102)
- Plus/minus: Sebastien Thinel (+28)
- Wins: Mike Clemente (25)
- Goals against average: Mathieu Corbeil (2.69)

The 2012–13 Missouri Mavericks season is the fourth season of the Central Hockey League (CHL) franchise in Independence, Missouri, a suburb of Kansas City, Missouri.

== Off-season ==
On May 24, 2012, the Mavericks extended Head Coach Scott Hillman's contract for two additional seasons through the 2013–14 season.

On July 31, 2012, the Mavericks announced an agreement with Entercom to have all 66 games for the 2012-13 season broadcast on radio on 1660 KUDL.

On September 8, 2012, the Mavericks announced the renewal of their affiliation agreement with the Chicago Wolves of the American Hockey League for the 2012–13 season.

On October 19, 2012, the day of the Mavericks' first Regular Season game against the Denver Cutthroats, the team announced Sebastien Thinel as the team's Captain and Ryan Jardine, Dave Pszenyczny, and David Simoes as Alternate Captains.

== Regular season ==
On March 17, 2013, with a 3–1 win over the Quad City Mallards, the Mavericks clinched their fourth consecutive berth in the 2013 Central Hockey League Ray Miron President's Cup Playoffs. It was announced on March 24, 2013, that the Mavericks clinched the 5th seed and would play the 4th-seeded Rapid City Rush in the first round of the playoffs.

Team	GP	W	L	OTL	GF	GA	Pts
y-Allen Americans	66	39	18	9	210	176	87
x-Wichita Thunder	66	39	19	8	240	182	86
x-Fort Worth Brahmas	66	36	22	8	187	182	80
x-Rapid City Rush	66	35	24	7	177	179	77
x-Missouri Mavericks	66	35	25	6	217	222	76
x-Quad City Mallards	66	34	26	6	219	201	74
x-Arizona Sundogs	66	32	27	7	180	185	71
x-Denver Cutthroats	66	30	26	10	205	215	70
Bloomington Blaze	66	28	36	2	230	246	58
Tulsa Oilers	66	22	39	5	177	254	49

y- Won Governor's Cup
x- Advanced to playoffs

== Playoffs ==
On April 23, 2013, the Mavericks' 2012–13 season ended with a 7–3 loss to the Allen Americans on the road in Allen, Texas in Game 7 of the Ray Miron President's Cup Playoffs Semifinals.

2013 Central Hockey League Ray Miron President's Cup Playoffs

Ray Miron President's Cup Playoffs Opening Round vs. #4 Rapid City Rush (Best-of-Seven Series) (Home: 3-0; Road: 1-2)
#	Date	Opponent	Score	OT	Decision	Series
1	March 29	@ Rapid City Rush	3-0		Tim Boron	0-1
2	March 30	@ Rapid City Rush	3-1		Tim Boron	0-2
3	April 3	Rapid City Rush	3-2	OT	Mathieu Corbeil	1-2
4	April 5	Rapid City Rush	4-2		Mike Clemente	2-2
5	April 6	Rapid City Rush	5-2		Mike Clemente	3-2
6	April 10	@ Rapid City Rush	5-1		Mathieu Corbeil	4-2

Ray Miron President's Cup Playoffs Semifinals vs. #1 Allen Americans (Best-of-Seven Series) (Home: 1-2; Road: 2-2)
#	Date	Opponent	Score	OT	Decision	Series
1	April 14	@ Allen Americans	5-1		Mathieu Corbeil	1-0
2	April 15	@ Allen Americans	4-1		Aaron Dell	1-1
3	April 17	Allen Americans	3-2	OT	Aaron Dell	1-2
4	April 19	Allen Americans	8-4		Aaron Dell	1-3
5	April 20	Allen Americans	3-2	OT	Mike Clemente	2-3
6	April 22	@ Allen Americans	6-2		Mike Clemente	3-3
7	April 23	@ Allen Americans	7-3		Aaron Dell	3-4

== Awards, records, and milestones ==
=== Awards and records ===
Player	Award/Record
Missouri Mavericks	CHL Awards (2012-13 Season): CHL Franchise of the Year; CHL Ticket Sales Franchise of the Year; CHL Group Sales Franchise of the Year; CHL Corporate Partnership Team of the Year; Central Hockey League 2012-13 Season "Best of The Best" Poll: 1st Place: Best Team Uniforms (Overall); Best Game Notes; Best Use of Social Media; Best Mascot (Mac); Best On-Ice Promotions; 2nd Place: Best Fans; Best Ice Surface; Best Team Website; 3rd Place; Best Press Box; Best Booster Club
Sebastien Thinel	Central Hockey League's Most valuable player (2012-13 season); Named to 2012-13 Season All-CHL Team.; Central Hockey League 2012-13 Season "Best of The Best" Poll: 1st Place: Best Overall Player; Best Playmaker; Most Valuable to His Team; Most Gentlemanly Player; 3rd Place: Best on Power Play
Jeff Pierce	Oakley CHL Player of The Week (Period ending October 21, 2012). In 2 games, he had 6 Points (on 3 Goals and 3 Assists) with a +2 Plus-Minus.
Mike Clemente	50/50 Central CHL Rookie of The Month (October 2012). In 3 games, he had a 2-0-1 record with a 3.01 GAA and a Save Percentage of 0.910.; CHL Player of The Week (week ending January 6, 2013). In 3 games, he had a 3-0 record with a 0.97 GAA, 50 Saves, and a Save Percentage of 0.972.
Mathieu Corbeil	Oakley CHL Goaltender of The Week (Period ended November 25, 2012). In 2 games, he had a 2-0-0 record with a 1.00 GAA, 50 Saves, and a Save Percentage of 0.962.
Andrew Courtney	Oakley CHL Player of The Week (Period ending December 9, 2012). In 2 games, he had 6 Points (on 4 Goals and 2 Assists) with a +3 Plus-Minus.
Kellan Tochkin	50/50 Central CHL Rookie of The Month (February 2012). In 12 games, he had 17 Points (on 6 Goals and 11 Assists) with a +5 Plus-Minus.
Dave Pszenyczny	Central Hockey League 2012-13 Season "Best of The Best" Poll: 3rd Place: Best Defensive Defenseman
Colt King	Central Hockey League 2012-13 Season "Best of The Best" Poll: 1st Place: Best Bodychecker; 2nd Place: Best Power Forward; 3rd Place; Best Fighter (Heavyweight)
David Simoes	Central Hockey League 2012-13 Season "Best of The Best" Poll: 2nd Place: Best Fighter (Pound for Pound)
John-Scott Dickson	Central Hockey League 2012-13 Season "Best of The Best" Poll: 3rd Place: Most Gentlemanly Player
Kenton Miller	Oakley CHL Player of The Week (Week ending March 25, 2013). In 2 games, he had 8 Points (on 5 Goals and 3 Assists) with a +2 Plus-Minus.; 50/50 Central CHL Rookie of The Month (March 2013). In 15 games, he had 16 Points (on 11 Goals and 5 Assists) with an Even Plus-Minus.
Bob Rennison	CHL Awards (2012-13 Season): CHL Broadcaster of the Year
Steve Garrett	Central Hockey League 2012-13 Season "Best of The Best" Poll: 1st Place: Best PA Announcer
Brent Thiessen	CHL Awards (2012-13 Season): Brad Treliving CHL Executive of the Year
Independence Events Center	Central Hockey League 2012-13 Season "Best of The Best" Poll: 3rd Place: Best Arena
Independence, Missouri	Central Hockey League 2012-13 Season "Best of The Best" Poll: 1st Place: Most Attractive Place to Play

== Transactions ==
Player Signings/Acquisitions off Waivers/Activated from League Suspension

Player	Former team	Date
Colt King	Sheffield Steelers	May 14, 2012
John-Scott Dickson	Re-Signed	June 4, 2012
Dave Pszenyczny	Re-Signed	June 4, 2012
David Simoes	Re-Signed	June 4, 2012
Brandon Smith	Re-signed	June 22, 2012
Matt McCready	Re-signed	June 22, 2012
Derek LeBlanc	Re-signed	June 22, 2012
Sebastien Thinel	Re-signed	July 19, 2012
B.J. O'Brien	Re-signed	July 19, 2012
Jamie VanderVeeken	Cardiff Devils	July 19, 2012
Brian Bicek	Evansville IceMen	July 31, 2012
Blake Forsyth	Rapid City Rush	July 31, 2012
Austin Lee	Minnesota State University, Mankato	August 22, 2012
Jason Dixon	Rio Grande Valley Killer Bees	August 22, 2012
Ryan Jardine	Re-Signed	September 8, 2012
Jordan Foreman	Gwinnett Gladiators	September 8, 2012
Kyle Moir	Eindhoven Kemphanen	October 1, 2012
Tyler Moir	Wheeling Nailers	October 1, 2012
Matt Krug	Toledo Walleye	October 3, 2012
Jeff Pierce	Cardiff Devils	October 3, 2012
Aaron Schwartz	Utah Grizzlies	October 10, 2012
Austin Lee	Missouri Mavericks	November 1, 2012
Andrew Courtney	Greenville Road Warriors	November 7, 2012
Josh Turnbull	Toledo Walleye	November 23, 2012
Evan Vossen	Utah Grizzlies	November 24, 2012
Colten Hayes	Fort Wayne Komets	November 27, 2012
Kyle Atkins	Pensacola Ice Flyers	November 29, 2012
Austin Lee	Missouri Mavericks	November 29, 2012
Jared Lavender	Evansville IceMen	December 28, 2012
Trevor Batty	Aberdeen Cougars	January 19, 2013
Jed Ortmeyer	Minnesota Wild	January 25, 2013
J.P. Testwuide	Abbotsford Heat	January 25, 2013
Robert Andrews		January 25, 2013
Trevor Kell	Activated from suspension by the Central Hockey League	January 26, 2013
Taylor Vichorek	Idaho Steelheads	January 31, 2013
Robert Andrews	Missouri Mavericks	February 1, 2013
Michael Uvodich	Evansville IceMen	February 1, 2013
Jesse Perrin	Activated from suspension by the Central Hockey League	February 9, 2013
J.P. Testwuide	Activated from Team Suspension	February 18, 2013
Brock Wilson	Nottingham Panthers	February 20, 2013
Jordan Crudo	Florida Atlantic University	February 22, 2013
Ryan Daniels	Wilfrid Laurier University	February 26, 2013
J.P. Testwuide	Activated from Team Suspension	March 1, 2013
Kellan Tochkin	Activated by Central Hockey League from 1 game league suspension	March 4, 2013
Joshua Hepditch	Allen Americans	March 7, 2013
Eric Meland	Princeton University	March 15, 2013
J.P. Testwuide	Activated from Team Suspension	March 22, 2013
Evan Zych	College of The Holy Cross	March 26, 2013
Jason Shaw	Saginaw Spirit	Ca. April 18, 2013

Free Agency Losses/Waivings/Player Retirements/Placements on Team Suspension/Suspended by League

Player	Free Agency Loss (New Team)/Waived (New Team)/Placed on Team Suspension (New Team)/Retired	Date
Ed McGrane	Free Agent (Brûleurs de Loups)	May 8, 2012
Charlie Effinger	Free Agent (Fort Wayne Komets)	July 19, 2012
Dale Mahovsky	Free Agent (Evansville IceMen)	September 24, 2012
Brad Walch	Free Agent (Reading Royals)	August 17, 2012
Cole Ruwe	Free Agent (Mississippi Surge)	August 27, 2012
Kris Hogg	Free Agent (Fife Flyers)	August 2012
Andrew Courtney	Free Agent (Connecticut Whale)	
Brad Good	Free Agent (Orlando Solar Bears)	September 26, 2012
Kevin Noble	Free Agent (Greenville Road Warriors)	September 28, 2012
Patrick Schafer	Free Agent (Greenville Road Warriors)	September 28, 2012
B.J. O'Brien	Waived (Augusta RiverHawks)	October 8, 2012
Kyle Moir	Waived	October 12, 2012
Tyler Moir	Waived (Sylvan Lake Admirals)	October 12, 2012
Aaron Schwartz	Waived (Viggbyholms IK)	October 13, 2012
Jordan Foreman	Waived (Clarenville Caribous)	October 18, 2012
Jason Dixon	Waived (Quad City Mallards)	October 18, 2012
Lukáš Bohunický	Free Agent (BK Mladá Boleslav)	October 19, 2012
Austin Lee	Waived (Missouri Mavericks)	October 30, 2012
Tristin Llewellyn	Free Agent (Fayetteville FireAntz)	
Austin Lee	Waived (Missouri Mavericks)	November 5, 2012
Jamie VanderVeeken	Waived (Rapid City Rush)	November 26, 2012
Matt Krug	Waived(Evansville IceMen)	December 6, 2012
Austin Lee	Waived (Augusta RiverHawks)	December 23, 2012
Kyle Atkins	Waived	January 5, 2013
Colten Hayes	Placed on Team Suspension (Stockton Thunder)	January 8, 2013
Trevor Batty	Waived	January 20, 2013
Trevor Kell	Suspended by Central Hockey League	January 23, 2013
Robert Andrews	Waived	January 26, 2013
Jed Ortmeyer	Placed on Team Suspension (San Antonio Rampage)	January 29, 2013
J.P. Testwuide	Placed on Team Suspension	January 29, 2013
Michael Uvodich	Waived	February 2, 2013
Taylor Vichorek	Waived	February 4, 2013
Robert Andrews	Waived	February 6, 2013
Jesse Perrin	Suspended by Central Hockey League	February 8, 2013
Josh Turnbull	Placed on Team Suspension (Fife Flyers)	January 29, 2013
J.P. Testwuide	Placed on Team Suspension	February 20, 2013
Jordan Crudo	Waived	February 25, 2013
Brock Wilson	Waived	February 27, 2013
Kellan Tochkin	Suspended by Central Hockey League for 1 game	March 3, 2013
Ryan Daniels	Placed on Team Suspension (Kalamazoo Wings)	March 6, 2013
J.P. Testwuide	Placed on Team Suspension	March 7, 2013
Jared Lavender	Waived (Fort Worth Brahmas)	March 24, 2013

Trades

November 5, 2012	To Arizona Sundogs: Derek LeBlanc	To Missouri: Future Considerations
December 13, 2012	To Arizona Sundogs: Brian Bicek, Matt McCready	To Missouri: Kyle Hood, Jesse Perrin
January 3, 2013	To Arizona Sundogs: Jeff Pierce	To Missouri: Future Considerations

Player Transfers to/from Affiliate Team or On Loan from Non-Affiliate Team

Player	To/From	Affiliate Team	Date
Brian Bicek	to	Chicago Wolves	
Matt McCready	to	Chicago Wolves	
Brian Bicek	from	Chicago Wolves	October 4, 2012
Matt McCready	from	Chicago Wolves	October 4, 2012
Riley Emmerson	from	Chicago Wolves	October 4, 2012
Trevor Kell	from	Chicago Wolves	October 4, 2012
Mike Clemente	from	Springfield Falcons	October 7, 2012
Kellan Tochkin	from	Chicago Wolves	October 8, 2012
Mathieu Corbeil	from	Chicago Wolves	October 8, 2012
Kenton Miller	from	Chicago Wolves	October 10, 2012
Mike Clemente	to	Springfield Falcons	November 1, 2012
Mike Clemente	from	Springfield Falcons	November 5, 2012
Kenton Miller	to	Chicago Wolves	January 6, 2013
Mathieu Corbeil	to	Chicago Wolves	January 14, 2013
Mathieu Corbeil	from	Chicago Wolves	January 17, 2013
Mathieu Corbeil	to	Chicago Wolves	January 19, 2013
Mathieu Corbeil	from	Chicago Wolves	January 26, 2013
Kenton Miller	from	Chicago Wolves	January 26, 2013
Kenton Miller	to	Chicago Wolves	January 28, 2013
Mathieu Corbeil	to	Chicago Wolves	January 29, 2013
Kenton Miller	from	Chicago Wolves	February 1, 2013
Mathieu Corbeil	from	Chicago Wolves	February 6, 2013
Mathieu Corbeil	to	Chicago Wolves	February 22, 2013
Mathieu Corbeil	from	Chicago Wolves	March 7, 2013

== Roster ==
2012-13 Missouri Mavericks
Goaltenders: 1 – Robert Andrews; (United States) 1 – Trevor Batty; (Canada) 1 – Ryan Daniels; (United States) 1 – Austin Lee; (United States) 30 – Mike Clemente; (Canada) 35 – Mathieu Corbeil; (United States) 35 – Jordan Crudo; (Canada) - – Kyle Moir; (United States) - – B.J. O'Brien	Defensemen: (Canada) 3 – David Simoes - A; (United States) 5 – Dave Pszenyczny - A; (Canada) 7 – Matt McCready; (United States) 7 – Eric Meland; (Canada) 8 – Kyle Hood; (United States) 10 – J.P. Testwuide; (United States) 13 – Blake Forsyth; (Canada) 14 – Kyle Atkins; (Canada) 20 – Joshua Hepditch; (United States) 20 – Brock Wilson; (United States) 22 – Matt Krug; (Canada) 22 – Jesse Perrin; (United States) 26 – Jared Lavender; (Canada) 26 – Jamie VanderVeeken; (Canada) 26 – Evan Zych; (United States) 36 – Taylor Vichorek; (Canada) 41 – Colten Hayes; (Canada) - – Jordan Foreman; (United States) - – Aaron Schwartz	Forward: (United States) 4 – Brandon Smith; (United States) 8 – Joshua Turnbull; (Canada) 9 – Trevor Kell (RW); (United States) 10 – Brian Bicek; (Canada) 12 – Evan Vossen; (Canada) 16 – Kellan Tochkin (RW); (United States) 17 – Jeff Pierce (RW); (Canada) 19 – Derek LeBlanc (Center); (United States) 20 – Michael Uvodich; (Canada) 21 – Ryan Jardine (LW) - A; (Canada) 27 – Andrew Courtney; (Canada) 28 – Kenton Miller (Center); (Canada) 40 – John-Scott Dickson (LW); (United States) 41 – Jed Ortmeyer (RW); (Canada) 43 – Sébastien Thinel (RW) - C; (Canada) 45 – Colt King; (Canada) 59 – Riley Emmerson (LW)	Coach: (Canada) Scott Hillman; President: (United States) Brent Thiessen

== See also ==
- 2012–13 CHL season
