= Sébastien Thinel =

Canadian ice hockey player

- Born: March 24, 1981 (age 45) Saint-Jérôme, Quebec, Canada
- Height: 6 ft 1 in (185 cm)
- Weight: 181 lb (82 kg; 12 st 13 lb)
- Position: Winger
- Shot: Left
- Played for: ECHL; Missouri Mavericks; Cincinnati Cyclones; CHL; Odessa Jackalopes; Ligue Magnus; Dragons de Rouen; Brûleurs de Loups de Grenoble; EIHL; Fife Flyers; LNAH; Rivière-du-Loup 3L
- NHL draft: Undrafted
- Playing career: 2002–2019

Sébastien Thinel (born March 24, 1981) is a retired Canadian professional ice hockey Winger.

On August 23, 2011, Thinel was signed by the Missouri Mavericks of the Central Hockey League for the 2011–12 season. During that season, Thinel became the first player in team history to score at least 80 Points in a season (82 Points on 23 Goals and 59 Assists) That season, he also broke Jeff Christian's franchise record of Points scored in a season (78 Points set during the team's inaugural 2009-10 season).

On July 19, 2012, it was announced that Thinel re-signed with the Mavericks for the 2012–13 Missouri Mavericks season.

On June 13, 2013, it was announced that Thinel re-signed with the Mavericks for the 2013-14 season. During that season, on February 15, 2014 against the Allen Americans, Thinel scored his 300th goal in the Central Hockey League, becoming only the sixth player in league history to do so. During a 5–2 win against the Quad City Mallards on March 5, 2014, Thinel became only the third player in Central Hockey League history to score 900 career Points in the Central Hockey League. In a game against the Brampton Beast on March 16, 2014, Thinel climbed to second place on the All-Time Central Hockey League Assist list with 602 Assists.

On July 7, 2014, Thinel re-signed with the Missouri Mavericks for the 2014–15 season. On October 7, 2014, it was announced that the Central Hockey League had folded and had joined the ECHL, nullifying Thinel's Central Hockey League contract with the team. On October 9, 2014, Thinel re-signed with the Mavericks under an ECHL contract.

In July 2014, Missouri Mavericks fans voted Thinel the Number 1 greatest Mavericks player in a poll of the Top-10 Mavericks players from the first 5 years of the team's existence.

On June 3, 2015, Thinel signed with the French club Brûleurs de Loups de Grenoble of League Magnus.

Ahead of the 2016/17 season, Thinel signed for the Fife Flyers of the UK's EIHL.

Thinel has since played for LNAH side Rivière-du-Loup 3L and Cornwall Senior Prowlers in the Ligue de Hockey Senior A de l'Outaouais (LHSAO).

On Jan. 12th, 2019 the Kansas City Mavericks retired his jersey, number 43, at a ceremony at the Silverstein Eye Center Arena.

His twin brother Marc-André was also a professional hockey player; they were teammates for three years as juniors at Victoriaville Tigres, and during the 2006–07 season at Rouen.

== Awards and honours ==
Honours	Year
CHL Most Valuable Player	2008–09; 2012–13
2014 Fan Vote of Top-10 Missouri Mavericks Players of All Time	1st Place
All-CHL Team	2008–09; 2010–11; 2012–13
CHL All-Star Team	2010–11; 2012–13
Joe Burton Award (CHL Scoring Champion)	2008–09; 2012–13
Central Hockey League "Best of The Best" Poll	2012–13 Season; 1st Place: Best Overall Player; Best Playmaker; Most Valuable to His Team; Most Gentlemanly Player; 3rd Place: Best on Power Play; 2013–14 Season; 1st Place: Best Playmaker; Best Shooter in Shootouts; 2nd Place: Best on Power Play; 3rd Place: Best Overall Player; Most Valuable to His Team
