= Taylor Vichorek =

American ice hockey player

- Born: August 25, 1988 (age 36); Moose Lake, MN, USA
- Height: 6 ft 8 in (203 cm)
- Weight: 271 lb (123 kg; 19 st 5 lb)
- Position: Forward
- Shot: Right
- Played for: ECHL; Trenton Devils/Titans; Idaho Steelheads; CHL; Missouri Mavericks; Quad City Mallards
- NHL draft: Undrafted
- Playing career: 2010–2013

Taylor Vichorek (born August 25, 1988, in Moose Lake, Minnesota) is an American former professional Ice Hockey Defenseman.

After playing junior ice hockey in the North American Hockey League for the Fairbanks Ice Dogs and the Alexandria Blizzard, Vichorek played collegiately for Hamline University for the 2009-10 season. On March 11, 2010, Vichorek was signed by the American Hockey League's Norfolk Admirals. He then spent the 2010–11 season with the Trenton Devils of the ECHL, for which he scored 15 Points in 68 games on 4 Goals and 15 Assists.

On September 15, 2011, Vichorek re-signed with the Devils, renamed the Trenton Titans, for the 2011–12 ECHL season. On October 24, 2011, the Titans released Vichorek. On November 16, 2011, it was announced that Vichorek signed with the Quad City Mallards of the Central Hockey League.

On January 9, 2013, Vichorek signed with the Idaho Steelheads of the ECHL, who would then release him on January 28, 2013. On January 31, 2013, Vichorek signed with the Missouri Mavericks of the Central Hockey League. On February 4, 2013, Vichorek was waived by the Mavericks.
