= Tyler Ludwig =

American ice hockey player (born 1985)

- Born: May 24, 1985 (age 40) Rhinelander, Wisconsin, U.S.
- Height: 6 ft 1 in (185 cm)
- Weight: 205 lb (93 kg; 14 st 9 lb)
- Position: Defense
- Shot: Right
- Played for: Texas Stars; San Antonio Rampage; Houston Aeros
- NHL draft: Undrafted
- Playing career: 2010–2015

Tyler Ludwig (born May 24, 1985) is an American former professional ice hockey defenseman. He last played with the Allen Americans of the ECHL having won three consecutive titles with the club in the Central Hockey League and the ECHL.

== Personal information ==
Tyler and his twin brother, Trevor, were teammates on the Americans. Their father, Craig Ludwig, played 17 seasons in the National Hockey League , with his last six playing for the Dallas Stars.

== Career statistics ==
			Regular season					Playoffs
Season	Team	League	GP	G	A	Pts	PIM	GP	G	A	Pts	PIM
2002–03	Texas Tornado	NAHL	44	1	2	3	46	—	—	—	—	—
2003–04	Texas Tornado	NAHL	52	3	25	28	50	—	—	—	—	—
2004–05	Texas Tornado	NAHL	56	2	19	21	46	12	1	4	5	27
2005–06	Texas Tornado	NAHL	12	1	2	3	16	13	2	5	7	4
2006–07	U. of Western Michigan	CCHA	37	1	11	12	54	—	—	—	—	—
2007–08	U. of Western Michigan	CCHA	38	4	11	15	40	—	—	—	—	—
2008–09	U. of Western Michigan	CCHA	41	8	21	29	62	—	—	—	—	—
2009–10	U. of Western Michigan	CCHA	36	3	11	14	22	—	—	—	—	—
2009–10	Texas Stars	AHL	7	0	0	0	4	—	—	—	—	—
2010–11	Idaho Steelheads	ECHL	70	3	13	16	82	9	1	0	1	6
2011–12	Allen Americans	CHL	64	4	25	29	41	6	0	0	0	2
2011–12	San Antonio Rampage	AHL	1	0	0	0	0	—	—	—	—	—
2012–13	Allen Americans	CHL	64	11	40	51	70	19	5	11	16	6
2012–13	Houston Aeros	AHL	1	0	0	0	0	—	—	—	—	—
2013–14	Allen Americans	CHL	62	20	35	55	62	17	3	10	13	16
2014–15	Allen Americans	ECHL	57	16	21	37	42	20	1	7	8	22
AHL totals			9	0	0	0	4	—	—	—	—	—

== Awards and honors ==
Honors	Year
All-CHL Team (First Team All-Star)	2012–13
All-CHL Team (First Team All-Star)	2013–14
CHL Most Outstanding Defenseman	2013–14
