= Shane Owen =

Canadian ice hockey goaltender (born 1990)

- Born: June 4, 1990 (age 36) Shanty Bay, Ontario, Canada
- Height: 6 ft 1 in (185 cm)
- Weight: 183 lb (83 kg; 13 st 1 lb)
- Position: Goaltender
- Catches: Left
- NIHL team Former teams: Sheffield Steeldogs; AHL; Hershey Bears; ECHL; Cincinnati Cyclones; Florida Everblades; South Carolina Stingrays; Utah Grizzlies; Alaska Aces; Stockton Thunder; Indy Fuel; Elmira Jackals; Wichita Thunder; Rapid City Rush; CHL; Missouri Mavericks; LNAH; Jonquière Marquis; Trois Rivieres Caron and Guay; EIHL; Belfast Giants; Coventry Blaze; Fife Flyers; HockeyAllsvenskan; BIK Karlskoga; PHL; GKS Katowice
- NHL draft: Undrafted
- Playing career: 2011–present

Shane Owen (born June 4, 1990) is a Canadian professional ice hockey goaltender who currently plays for Sheffield Steeldogs in the National Ice Hockey League (NIHL).

== Playing career ==
Owen played major junior hockey in both the Ontario Hockey League (OHL) and the Quebec Major Junior Hockey League (QMJHL). During the 2009–10 QMJHL season he help the Moncton Wildcats capture the QMJHL Championship and a berth in the 2010 Memorial Cup.

Owen began his professional career on January 29, 2011, when he signed an amateur tryout agreement with the Florida Everblades of the ECHL. Afterwards, Owen spent time with teams in the American Hockey League, ECHL, and the Ligue Nord-Américaine de Hockey

On August 6, 2013, Owen signed with the Missouri Mavericks of the Central Hockey League. In his first season with the Missouri Mavericks, Owen led the CHL with 35 Wins, was named to both the All-CHL Team and All-Rookie Team for the 2013–14, was named the Oakley Central Hockey League Goaltender of The Week four times, and was named the Warrior Central Hockey League Goaltender of The Month for the month of December 2013.

In July 2014, Missouri Mavericks fans voted Owen the ninth-greatest Mavericks player in a poll of the Top-10 Mavericks players from the first 5 years of the team's existence. On July 11, 2014, Owen signed with the Stockton Thunder of the ECHL.

On January 6, 2015 Owen was traded to the Indy Fuel in exchange for goaltender Cody Reichard and forward Klarc Wilson.

As a free agent, on August 12, 2016, Owen opted to sign a contract abroad, agreeing to a one-year deal with the Fife Flyers of the EIHL.

After a season in the UK Owen signed for BIK Karlskoga of the HockeyAllsvenskan ahead of the 2017-18 season, confirming the move in April 2017.

Then he moved to Poland to GKS Katowice, where after a very successful season he became a runner-up in Polska Hokej Liga playoffs.

Owen returned to Fife Flyers for the 2018-19 season, before joining league rivals Belfast Giants ahead of the 2019-20 EIHL season.

In March 2021, Owen joined fellow EIHL side Coventry Blaze ahead of the 2021 Elite Series.

In August 2021, Owen returned to Fife for a third spell. In June 2022, Owen committed to Fife by signing a fresh two-year deal.

After seven consecutive seasons in the EIHL, Owen moved down to the UK's second-tier league, the NIHL, signing with the Sheffield Steeldogs.

== Awards and honours ==
Award	Year
All-CHL Team	2013–14
