= Matt Stephenson =

Canadian ice hockey player

- Born: March 3, 1984 (age 42) Midland, Ontario, Canada
- Height: 6 ft 2 in (188 cm)
- Weight: 204 lb (93 kg; 14 st 8 lb)
- Position: Defence
- Shoots: Right
- Played for: AHL; Texas Stars; Providence Bruins; Iowa Stars; ECHL; Missouri Mavericks; Idaho Steelheads; EIHL; Sheffield Steelers
- NHL draft: Undrafted
- Playing career: 2008–present

Matt Stephenson (born March 3, 1984) is a Canadian retired professional ice hockey defenceman.

Stephenson spent his junior hockey in the Ontario Junior Hockey League with the Parry Sound Shamrocks, Cambridge Winter Hawks, and Nepean Raiders.

Stephenson played NCAA Division I College Ice Hockey with St. Cloud State University for four seasons from the 2004-05 season through the 2007-08 season. During the 2007-08 season, Stephenson served as St. Cloud State's Captain and was one of only 5 players to play in every game.

After completing his collegiate career, Stephenson signed an Amateur Try Out contract with the Iowa Stars of the American Hockey League for the remainder of the 2007-08 season.

During the following season, Stepehnson played in 53 games for the Idaho Steelheads of the ECHL and 17 games for the Providence Bruins of the American Hockey League.

On September 11, 2009, Stephenson was signed by the Texas Stars of the American Hockey League. On September 17, 2010, it was announced that Stephenson was invited to the 2009 Training Camp of the Dallas Stars, before being cut from Dallas' camp and returned to the Texas Stars. Stephenson spent the entire 2009-10 season with the Texas Stars, appearing in 61 games.

Stephenson re-signed with the Texas Stars for the 2010-11 season and would attend the 2010 Training Camp for the Dallas Stars. After attending Dallas' 2010 Training Camp, Stephenson played his second consecutive season with the Texas Stars for its 2010-11 season.

For the 2011-12 season, Stephenson signed with the Sheffield Steelers of the British Elite Ice Hockey League. Stephenson would again play for the Steelers for the 2012-13 season.

On August 13, 2013, Stepehnson signed with the Missouri Mavericks of the Central Hockey League for the 2013-14 season. On February 6, 2015, the Mavericks, now part of the ECHL, re-signed Stephenson, who had not played Professional Hockey since his last stint with the Mavericks, for the remainder of the 2014-15 season. Stephenson retired from Professional Ice Hockey at the end of the 2014–15 season.

For the 2018-19 ECHL season, Matt is the color commentator for the Mavericks on KSMO-TV's Friday Night Ice broadcasts.

== Awards and honours ==
Award	Year
William Radovich Award (most improved player)	2004–05
All-WCHA Academic Team	2005-06, 2006-07, 2007-08
WCHA Scholar-Athlete Award	2005-06
All-CHL Team (First Team All-Star)	2013–14
CHL Best of The Best Poll: Best Defensive Defenseman	2013-14
