= J. P. Testwuide =

American ice hockey player

- Born: November 5, 1984 (age 41) Vail, Colorado, U.S.
- Height: 6 ft 0 in (183 cm)
- Weight: 203 lb (92 kg; 14 st 7 lb)
- Position: Defense
- Shot: Left
- Played for: AHL; Houston Aeros; Adirondack Phantoms; Chicago Wolves; Abbotsford Heat; CHL; Missouri Mavericks
- NHL draft: Undrafted
- Playing career: 2009–2013

Jon Paul "J.P." Testwuide (born November 5, 1984) is an American former professional ice hockey defenseman.

On August 2, 2011, the Chicago Wolves announced that they had signed Testwuide for the 2011–12 AHL season. On November 7, 2011, the Wolves assigned Testwuide to the Missouri Mavericks, the team's Central Hockey League affiliate. On November 14, 2011, Testwuide was recalled by the Wolves. On December 3, 2011, Testwuide was assigned by the Wolves to the Mavericks for a second time. On December 6, 2011, Testwuide was recalled by the Wolves from the Mavericks again. On March 5, 2012, Testwuide was loaned by the Wolves to the Abbotsford Heat, also of the American Hockey League.

Per remarks made by J.P.'s brother, fellow professional Hockey player Mike Testwuide, which were published in a November 26, 2012 blog post on the website of the newspaper The Saratogian, J.P. had retired from professional Hockey.

On January 25, 2013, Testwuide came out of retirement and signed with the Missouri Mavericks of the Central Hockey League for his third stint with the team.

== Career statistics ==
| | | | Regular season | | | | | Playoffs |
| Season | Team | League | GP | G | A | Pts | PIM | GP | G | A | Pts | PIM |
|---|---|---|---|---|---|---|---|---|---|---|---|---|
| 2003-04 | Waterloo Black Hawks | USHL | 59 | 4 | 13 | 17 | 106 | 12 | 0 | 3 | 3 | 18 |
| 2004-05 | Waterloo Black Hawks | USHL | 55 | 4 | 6 | 10 | 165 | 5 | 0 | 0 | 0 | 14 |
| 2005-06 | Denver Pioneers | NCAA | 32 | 0 | 4 | 4 | 43 | — | — | — | — | — |
| 2006-07 | Denver Pioneers | NCAA | 37 | 0 | 3 | 3 | 63 | — | — | — | — | — |
| 2007-08 | Denver Pioneers | NCAA | 39 | 2 | 6 | 8 | 66 | — | — | — | — | — |
| 2008–09 | Denver Pioneers | NCAA | 36 | 3 | 10 | 13 | 110 | — | — | — | — | — |
| 2008–09 | Houston Aeros | AHL | 2 | 0 | 0 | 0 | 4 | 13 | 1 | 1 | 2 | 14 |
| 2009–10 | Houston Aeros | AHL | 58 | 2 | 6 | 8 | 111 | — | — | — | — | — |
| 2010–11 | Adirondack Phantoms | AHL | 48 | 1 | 4 | 5 | 56 | — | — | — | — | — |
| 2011–12 | Chicago Wolves | AHL | 23 | 0 | 1 | 1 | 15 | — | — | — | — | — |
| 2011–12 | Missouri Mavericks | CHL | 4 | 0 | 1 | 1 | 2 | — | — | — | — | — |
| 2011–12 | Abbotsford Heat | AHL | 18 | 0 | 1 | 1 | 15 | 8 | 0 | 0 | 0 | 2 |
| 2012–13 | Missouri Mavericks | CHL | 9 | 0 | 1 | 1 | 7 | 10 | 0 | 4 | 4 | 12 |
| AHL totals | | | 149 | 3 | 12 | 15 | 201 | 21 | 1 | 1 | 2 | 16 |
| CHL totals | | | 13 | 0 | 2 | 2 | 9 | 10 | 0 | 4 | 4 | 12 |
| NCAA totals | | | 144 | 5 | 23 | 28 | 282 | — | — | — | — | — |
| USHL totals | | | 114 | 8 | 19 | 27 | 271 | 17 | 0 | 3 | 3 | 32 |

Awards and achievements
| Preceded by Joel Hanson | WCHA Student-Athlete of the Year; 2008–09 | Succeeded by Eli Vlaisavljevich |
