= Henrik Ødegaard =

Norwegian ice hockey player

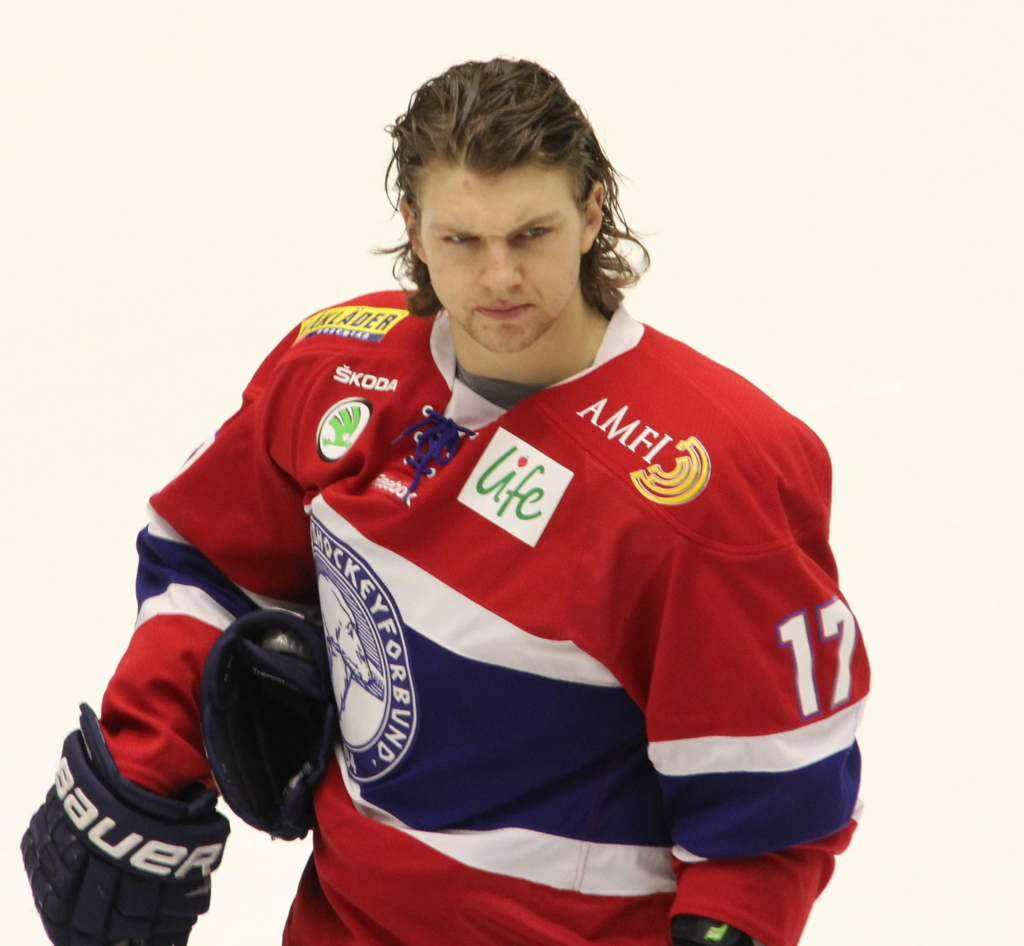
- Ødegaard in 2013
- Born: February 12, 1988 (age 38) Asker, Norway
- Height: 5 ft 10 in (178 cm)
- Weight: 187 lb (85 kg; 13 st 5 lb)
- Position: Defence
- Shot: Left
- GET team Former teams: Frisk Asker; Chicago Wolves; Missouri Mavericks; Sparta Warriors; Lørenskog IK
- National team: Norway
- Playing career: 2006–2020

Henrik Ødegaard (born February 12, 1988) is a Norwegian ice hockey player who is currently playing for Frisk Asker of the Norwegian GET-ligaen.

After playing professionally in the Norwegian GET-ligaen for Ishockeyklubben Sparta Sarpsborg and Frisk Asker Ishockey, Ødegaard signed with the Chicago Wolves of the American Hockey League on October 1, 2013.

After playing one game for the Wolves, Ødegaard was assigned by the Wolves to their affiliate the Missouri Mavericks of the Central Hockey League on October 10, 2013.

Ødegaard also played seven games for Norway in the 2013 IIHF World Championship. On January 7, 2014, Ødegaard was named to Norway men's national ice hockey team for the 2014 Winter Olympics On April 18, 2014, Ødegaard was called back up to the Chicago Wolves of the American Hockey League.

On June 16, 2014 Ødegaard signed with Lørenskog IK of GET-ligaen.

== Awards and honours ==
Award	Year
CHL All-Rookie Team	2013–14

== Career statistics ==
=== Regular season and playoffs ===
			Regular season					Playoffs
Season	Team	League	GP	G	A	Pts	PIM	GP	G	A	Pts	PIM
2004–05	Frisk Asker	NOR U18	18	5	6	11	38	—	—	—	—	—
2006–07	Frisk Asker	NOR	34	0	1	1	91	6	0	1	1	6
2007–08	Frisk Asker	NOR	40	2	6	8	104	15	0	3	3	12
2008–09	Frisk Asker	NOR	33	1	2	3	56	—	—	—	—	—
2009–10	Frisk Asker	NOR	42	2	3	5	58	—	—	—	—	—
2010–11	Frisk Asker	NOR	44	1	8	9	111	5	0	0	0	8
2011–12	Sparta Warriors	NOR	44	2	11	13	136	3	0	1	1	6
2012–13	Sparta Warriors	NOR	45	2	7	9	116	11	0	0	0	14
2013–14	Chicago Wolves	AHL	1	0	0	0	2	—	—	—	—	—
2013–14	Missouri Mavericks	CHL	52	1	3	4	62	6	0	1	1	8
2014–15	Lørenskog IK	NOR	33	0	4	4	129	6	0	0	0	4
2015–16	Lørenskog IK	NOR	40	5	7	12	104	17	2	1	3	10
2016–17	Frisk Asker	NOR	34	3	11	14	28	17	1	5	6	26
2017–18	Frisk Asker	NOR	28	0	2	2	34	10	0	1	1	22
2018–19	Frisk Asker	NOR	41	2	7	9	107	18	0	2	2	14
2019–20	Frisk Asker	NOR	42	0	5	5	104	—	—	—	—	—
NOR totals			500	20	74	94	1178	108	3	14	17	122

=== International ===
Year	Team	Event	GP	G	A	Pts	PIM
2005	Norway	WJC18 D1	5	0	0	0	0
2006	Norway	WJC18	6	0	0	0	8
2007	Norway	WJC D1	5	0	0	0	6
2008	Norway	WJC D1	5	0	1	1	4
2008	Norway	WC	7	0	0	0	2
2013	Norway	WC	7	0	0	0	4
2014	Norway	OG	4	0	0	0	0
2014	Norway	WC	6	0	0	0	8
2015	Norway	WC	7	0	0	0	0
2016	Norway	WC	7	0	0	0	2
2016	Norway	OGQ	3	0	0	0	0
2017	Norway	WC	7	0	1	1	2
2018	Norway	OG	5	0	0	0	2
Junior totals			21	0	1	1	18
Senior totals			53	0	1	1	20
