= Colten Hayes =

Canadian ice hockey player

- Born: January 31, 1990 (age 36) Maple Ridge, British Columbia, Canada
- Height: 6 ft 2 in (188 cm)
- Weight: 201 lb (91 kg; 14 st 5 lb)
- Position: Defence
- Shoots: Right
- team Former teams: Free Agent; Stockton Thunder; Reading Royals; Fort Wayne Komets; Missouri Mavericks; Alaska Aces
- NHL draft: Undrafted
- Playing career: 2011–present

Colten Hayes (born January 31, 1990) is a Canadian professional ice hockey defenceman who is currently an unrestricted free agent who most recently played under contract to the Chicago Wolves of the American Hockey League (AHL), on loan to the Missouri Mavericks of the ECHL.

== Playing career ==
Hayes played Junior Hockey for the Sicamous Eagles, Salmon Arm Silverbacks, Drumheller Dragons, Langley Chiefs, Okotoks Oilers.

Hayes began his professional career during the 2011–12 season in the ECHL, playing a total of 48 games for the Stockton Thunder and the Reading Royals.

On September 27, 2012, it was announced Hayes was invited to Training Camp with the Connecticut Whale of the American Hockey League. On October 5, 2012, Hayes was released by the Whale from their Training Camp. On October 6, 2012, Hayes was added to the Training Camp roster of the Greenville Road Warriors of the ECHL. On October 10, 2012, Hayes was released by the Road Warriors from their Training Camp.

On October 18, 2012, Hayes signed with the Fort Wayne Komets of the ECHL. On November 26, 2012, after playing 10 games for the Komets, Hayes was released by the Komets, subsequently being picked up off of waivers by the South Carolina Stingrays of the ECHL on November 27, 2013. Instead of reporting to the Stingrays, Hayes signed with the Missouri Mavericks of the Central Hockey League on November 27, 2012. In the midst of playing for the Mavericks, Hayes's ECHL rights were traded from the South Carolina Stingrays to the Stockton Thunder on January 9, 2013, in exchange for centre Phil Mangan. That same day, after playing 18 games for the Missouri Mavericks, Hayes left the Mavericks to join the Stockton Thunder; the Mavericks consequently placed Hayes on Team Suspension.

After finishing the 2012–13 season with the Thunder, Hayes returned to the Missouri Mavericks during the off-season, signing with the team on August 13, 2013, for the 2013-14 season. On September 25, 2013, Hayes was invited to the 2013 Training Camp of the Chicago Wolves of the American Hockey League. Hayes was later released from the Wolves' Training Camp and re-joined the Missouri Mavericks roster for the 2013-14 season.

On July 30, 2014, Hayes was signed to a Two-Way Contract with the Chicago Wolves, the American Hockey League affiliate team for the Missouri Mavericks.

On October 6, 2014, Hayes was assigned by the Wolves to the Missouri Mavericks, which had become a member of the ECHL.

On November 6, 2014, Hayes was recalled by the Chicago Wolves and, on November 7, 2014, was reassigned to the Alaska Aces of the ECHL. On March 11, 2015, the Wolves reassigned Hayes from the Aces back to the Missouri Mavericks of the ECHL.
