= 2012–13 CHL season =

- League: Central Hockey League
- Sport: Ice hockey
- Duration: October 19, 2012–May 11, 2013
- Number of teams: 10

Regular season
- Governor's Cup: Allen Americans
- Season MVP: Sebastien Thinel (Missouri)
- Top scorer: Sebastien Thinel (Missouri)

Finals
- Champions: Allen Americans
- Runners-up: Wichita Thunder

CHL seasons
- ← 2011–12 2013–14 →

The 2012–13 CHL season was the 21st season of the Central Hockey League (CHL).

== League business ==
Following the 2011–12 CHL season the number of the teams in the CHL dropped to 10 teams, with the Ray Miron President's Cup-winning Fort Wayne Komets moving to the ECHL along with the Evansville IceMen, the Dayton Gems ceased operations and were replaced by a Federal Hockey League team, the Dayton Demonz, the Rio Grande Valley Killer Bees ceased operations, the Laredo Bucks were moved to St. Charles, Missouri, and would rejoin the league as the St. Charles Chill in the 2013–14 CHL Season. The Denver Cutthroats joined the CHL to play in their inaugural season. The CHL eliminated its previous two-conference system consisting of the Berry and Turner conferences and played as a single 10-team league. For 2013–14, the league added its first ever Canadian team in Brampton, Ontario, just north of Toronto.

== Teams ==
2012-13 Central Hockey League
Team	City	Arena
Allen Americans	Allen, Texas	Allen Event Center
Arizona Sundogs	Prescott Valley, Arizona	Tim's Toyota Center
Bloomington Blaze	Bloomington, Illinois	U.S. Cellular Coliseum
Denver Cutthroats	Denver, Colorado	Denver Coliseum
Fort Worth Brahmas	North Richland Hills, Texas	NYTEX Sports Centre
Missouri Mavericks	Independence, Missouri	Independence Events Center
Quad City Mallards	Moline, Illinois	iWireless Center
Rapid City Rush	Rapid City, South Dakota	Rushmore Plaza Civic Center
Tulsa Oilers	Tulsa, Oklahoma	BOK Center
Wichita Thunder	Wichita, Kansas	Intrust Bank Arena

== Map of teams ==
CHL Teams

== Regular season ==
=== Standings ===
Team	GP	W	L	OTL	GF	GA	Pts
y-Allen Americans	66	39	18	9	210	176	87
x-Wichita Thunder	66	39	19	8	240	182	86
x-Fort Worth Brahmas	66	36	22	8	187	182	80
x-Rapid City Rush	66	35	24	7	177	179	77
x-Missouri Mavericks	66	35	25	6	217	222	76
x-Quad City Mallards	66	34	26	6	219	201	74
x-Arizona Sundogs	66	32	27	7	180	185	71
x-Denver Cutthroats	66	30	26	10	205	215	70
Bloomington Blaze	66	28	36	2	230	246	58
Tulsa Oilers	66	22	39	5	177	254	49

y- Won Governor's Cup
x- Advanced to playoffs

=== Individual statistics ===
Individual Point Leaders	Team	Pos.	GP	G	A	Pts.	+/−	PIM
Sébastien Thinel	Missouri Mavericks	F	66	29	67	96	+28	24
Jon Booras	Bloomington Blaze	F	66	32	54	86	−7	60
A. J. Gale	Denver Cutthroats	F	64	46	38	84	−3	38
Mickey Lang	Quad City Mallards	F	64	41	42	83	+20	23
Ryan Menei	Tulsa Oilers	F	66	34	48	82	−29	49

Goaltending Leaders	Team	GP	TOI	W	L	OTL	SO	GAA	GAA	SV	SV%
Aaron Dell	Allen Americans	44	2344:00	22	11	6	3	90	2.30	987	.916
Kristofer Westblom	Fort Worth Brahmas	37	2091:05	21	8	5	4	80	2.30	781	.907
Kevin Regan	Wichita Thunder	27	1570:21	13	10	3	2	63	2.41	624	.908
Tim Boron	Rapid City Rush	39	2108:28	20	12	3	2	85	2.42	1012	.923
Danny Battochio	Rapid City Rush	29	1569:36	14	10	2	0	66	2.52	687	.912

== Playoffs ==
=== Playoff bracket ===
Opening Round
1	Allen	4
8	Denver	1
4	Rapid City	2
5	Missouri	4
2	Wichita	4
7	Arizona	0
3	Fort Worth	4
6	Quad City	1

Conference Semi-finals
1	Allen	4
5	Missouri	3
2	Wichita	4
3	Fort Worth	0

Ray Miron Presidents' Cup Finals
1	Allen	4
2	Wichita	3

== Awards ==
=== All-CHL Team ===
- A. J. Gale (F), Denver Cutthroats
- Mickey Lang (F), Quad City Mallards
- Sebastien Thinel (F), Missouri Mavericks
- Tyler Ludwig (D), Allen Americans
- Kevin Young (D), Wichita Thunder
- Aaron Dell (G), Allen Americans
