= 2013–14 CHL season =

- League: Central Hockey League
- Sport: Ice hockey

Regular season
- Governor's Cup: Missouri Mavericks
- Season MVP: Garett Bembridge
- Top scorer: Garett Bembridge

Finals
- Champions: Allen Americans
- Runners-up: Denver Cutthroats

CHL seasons
- ← 2012–13 2014–15 (ECHL) →

The 2013–14 CHL season was the 22nd season of the Central Hockey League (CHL). It was the last season of the CHL, as the league ceased operations in October 2014 after only seven teams remained. Allen, Brampton, Missouri, Quad City, Rapid City, Tulsa, and Wichita were accepted as expansion teams into the ECHL.

== League business ==
- The Laredo Bucks were moved to St. Charles, Missouri to rejoin the league as the St. Charles Chill
- The CHL gets its first Canadian franchise as the Brampton Beast join the league as an expansion team
- The Bloomington Blaze moved to the Southern Professional Hockey League, becoming the Bloomington Thunder
- The Fort Worth Brahmas folded and were replaced by a North American Hockey League team

== Teams ==
2013-14 Central Hockey League
Team	City	Arena
Allen Americans	Allen, Texas	Allen Event Center
Arizona Sundogs	Prescott Valley, Arizona	Tim's Toyota Center
Brampton Beast	Brampton, Ontario	Powerade Centre
Denver Cutthroats	Denver, Colorado	Denver Coliseum
Missouri Mavericks	Independence, Missouri	Independence Events Center
Quad City Mallards	Moline, Illinois	iWireless Center
Rapid City Rush	Rapid City, South Dakota	Rushmore Plaza Civic Center
St. Charles Chill	St. Charles, Missouri	Family Arena
Tulsa Oilers	Tulsa, Oklahoma	BOK Center
Wichita Thunder	Wichita, Kansas	Intrust Bank Arena

== Map of teams ==
CHL Teams

== Regular season ==
=== Standings ===
Team	GP	W	L	OTL	GF	GA	Pts
xMissouri Mavericks	66	44	20	2	238	184	90
xDenver Cutthroats	66	38	17	11	214	194	87
xAllen Americans	66	39	22	5	249	214	83
xRapid City Rush	66	39	23	4	220	189	82
xQuad City Mallards	66	33	23	10	219	198	76
xBrampton Beast	66	33	26	7	209	226	73
xTulsa Oilers	66	34	29	3	225	215	71
xArizona Sundogs	66	32	27	7	197	204	71
Wichita Thunder	66	27	30	9	201	223	63
St. Charles Chill	66	11	49	6	156	281	28

x indicates team has clinched playoff spot

Final 2013–14 regular-season standings

== Playoffs ==
=== Playoff bracket ===
Quarter Finals
1	Missouri	2
8	Arizona	4
2	Denver	4
7	Tulsa	2
3	Allen	4
6	Brampton	1
4	Rapid City	3
5	Quad City	4

Semi-Finals
2	Denver	4
8	Arizona	1
3	Allen	4
5	Quad City	2

Championships
2	Denver	1
3	Allen	4

== Awards ==
2013–14 CHL awards
Award	Recipient(s)	Ref
Ray Miron President's Cup	Allen Americans	
Best Regular-Season Record	Missouri Mavericks (90 pts)	
Athletic Trainer of the Year	Stuart Nichols (Tulsa Oilers)	
Gunner Garrett Equipment Manager of the Year	Kacee Coberly (Allen Americans)	
Defenseman of the Year	Tyler Ludwig (Allen Americans)	
Rookie of the Year	Alexandre Lavoie (Allen Americans)	
Most Outstanding Goaltender (Scott Brower Award)	Andrew Engelage (Arizona Sundogs)	
Man of the Year	Calin Wild (Brampton Beast)	
Coach of the Year	Derek Armstrong (Denver Cutthroats)	
Most Valuable Player	Garett Bembridge (Denver Cutthroats)	

=== All-CHL selections ===
Position	First Team	All-Rookie
G	(Canada) Shane Owen (Missouri Mavericks)	(Canada) Ty Rimmer (Quad City)
D	(United States) Tyler Ludwig (Allen Americans)	(Norway) Henrik Odegaard (Missouri)
D	(Canada) Matt Stephenson (Missouri Mavericks)	(United States) Lee Moffie (Denver)
F	(Canada) Garett Bembridge (Denver Cutthroats)	(Canada) Vincent Arseneau (Denver)
F	(United States) Ben Gordon (Tulsa Oilers)	(Canada) Alexandre Lavoie (Allen)
F	(Canada) Troy Schwab (Denver Cutthroats)	(Canada) Adam Pleskach (Tulsa)
