= Rapid City Rush =

American ice hockey team

- City: Rapid City, South Dakota
- League: ECHL
- Conference: Western
- Division: Mountain
- Founded: 2008 (In the CHL)
- Home arena: The Monument
- Colors: Red, black, white
- Owner: Spire Sports + Entertainment
- Head coach: Dave Smith
- Media: Rapid City Rush on Mixlr"
- Affiliates: Calgary Flames (NHL); Calgary Wranglers (AHL)
- Website: rapidcityrush.com

Franchise history
- 2008–present: Rapid City Rush

Championships
- Division titles: 1 (2010–11)
- Conference titles: 1 (2009–10)
- Ray Miron President's Cup: 1 (2009–10)

The Rapid City Rush are a professional ice hockey team in the ECHL based in Rapid City, South Dakota, and play their home games at The Monument. The Rush are currently a minor affiliate of the Calgary Flames NHL franchise.

== History ==
On June 2, 2007, the Central Hockey League announced an expansion team for Rapid City, which began play in the 2008–09 season. Two months later, the team named Joe Ferras as their head coach and director of hockey operations, and Jason Rent as general manager. Rent resigned from the organization, and Tim Hill was named general manager in the spring of 2009. In September 2007, the Rush unveiled their name, colors, and logo. The team is owned in majority by Scott Mueller. Mueller was previously involved in ownership with the Colorado Eagles, also of the Central Hockey League. Barry Petersen and Donald Ward are minority owners.

In their second season (2009–10), the Rush defeated the Allen Americans 4–3 with 39.3 seconds left in double-overtime in Game 6 of the Ray Miron President's Cup Finals at the Rushmore Plaza Civic Center in Rapid City to win the Ray Miron President's Cup. The Rush lost Game 1 of the series, but rebounded to win Game 2 in overtime on a Blaine Jarvis goal. The Rush then traveled to Allen for three straight games, where Allen won Game 3, but the Rush responded to win Games 4 and 5. In Game 6, the series returned to Rapid City, and initially looked as if there would be a Game 7 entering the third period with the score 3–1 in favor of the Americans. The Rush's Blaine Jarvis scored with 5:06 remaining in the third to bring the Rush within one. Exactly two minutes later, Brendon Cook scored, evening the score at 3 and forcing overtime. With 39.3 seconds left in the second overtime, a shot by Les Reaney deflected off the Allen goaltender Chris Whitley and the Rush's Scott Wray, rolling into the goal, sealing the win for the Rush and their first President's Cup.

During the 2010–11 season, the Rush were the host to the 2011 Central Hockey League All-Star Game. The Rush ended up losing to the All-Stars 11–6. Also, the Rush made the playoffs for the second straight season. In the first round, the Rush swept the Dayton Gems. During the second round against the Fort Wayne Komets, the Rush's leading scorer, Ryan Menei, was blindsided in Game 2 on a dirty hit by the Komets' Sean O'Connor. O'Connor was suspended the rest of the series, and the Rush went on to win the series in seven games. Next, the Rush faced their arch rivals, the Colorado Eagles. The series lasted seven games but the Eagles came away with the series win.

The 2012–13 season brought new changes to the Rush organization. Assistant coach and former team captain Mark DeSantis accepted the head coaching position with the Fayetteville FireAntz of the Southern Professional Hockey League (SPHL) and head coach, Joe Ferras, became the lone bench boss for the season. Rush All-Star and fan favorite goalie Danny Battochio was able to return to the team after suffering a serious injury in the 2011–12 season. During the regular season, inconsistent play left the Rush battling for a play-off spot and were plagued with a low-scoring offense (last in the league). The Rush finished the regular season strong, finishing fourth in the regular season standings.

For the 2014–15 season, Rapid City announced that former assistant coach and team captain Mark DeSantis would return as an associate coach. DeSantis had a successful 2013–14 season as the head coach of the expansion Brampton Beast. In addition, several roster changes were made. Goaltender Tim Boron was released, and former CHL Rookie of the Year Danny Battochio was signed to replace him. Also, longtime team captain Scott Wray and Konrad Reeder both announced their retirements.

On October 7, 2014, soon before the 2014–15 CHL season was set to begin, it was announced that the CHL had ceased operations and the Rush, along with the Allen Americans, Brampton Beast, Quad City Mallards, Missouri Mavericks, Tulsa Oilers, and Wichita Thunder, were all approved for membership into the ECHL for the 2014–15 season.

On August 11, 2015, the Rush announced that they had signed a one-year affiliation agreement with the National Hockey League's Arizona Coyotes and the American Hockey League's Springfield Falcons. This marks the first time the Rush has ever been affiliated with an NHL team. On February 18, 2016, head coach and general manager, Joe Ferras, announced he was stepping down from his coaching position and promoting Mark DeSantis to head coach. On July 14, 2016, the Rush and the Coyotes organization renewed their affiliation along with the Tucson Roadrunners of the AHL.

After one-and-a-half seasons, DeSantis was fired. He was replaced by former Rush captain Daniel Tetrault for the 2017–18 season as head coach. The Rush also changed their affiliations to the Minnesota Wild (NHL) and the Iowa Wild (AHL) but ended it after one season. The Rush entered the 2018–19 season independent of an affiliate after three seasons of affiliations and missed playoffs.

On January 11, 2019, the Rush announced an ownership change with Barry Peterson departing and Jeff Dickerson and T.J. Puchyr of Spire Sports + Entertainment joining. Scott Mueller remained the majority owner. On July 24, 2019, the Rush began a two-year affiliation agreement with the Arizona Coyotes and the Tucson Roadrunners. By October 2019, Federal Authorities had launched a criminal investigation into possible embezzlement by the team business manager. Spire, as Spire Hockey, became the sole owners of the team in May 2020, and the former business manager was indicted and later pled to embezzlement charges. The former finance manager of the team was found to have stolen nearly $700,000 from the team between 2010 and 2018, eventually being sentenced to three years in prison and $1 million in restitutions.

Following the 2020–21 season, head coach Tetrault and the Rush agreed to end his contract. Over four seasons, Tetrault had led the Rush to a 116–134–25 record and never made a playoff appearance. He was replaced by Scott Burt in July 2021.

On August 25, 2022, the Rush reached an affiliate agreement with the Calgary Flames for the 2022–23 season.

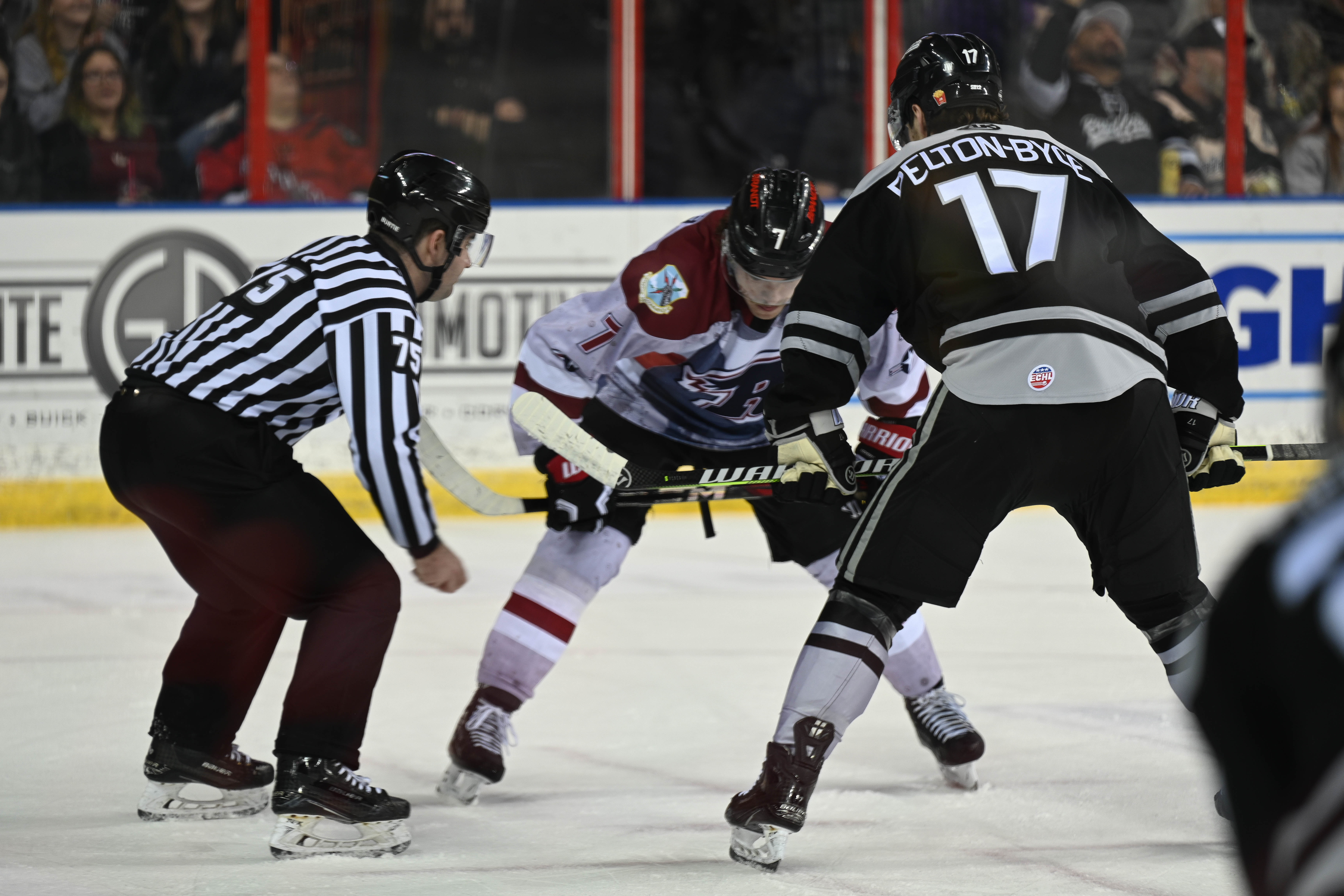
A face-off between the Rush and Idaho Steelheads at The Monument in 2025

== Season-by-season record ==
Note: GP = Games played, W = Wins, L = Losses, OTL = Overtime losses, SOL=Shootout losses, Pts = Points, GF = Goals for, GA = Goals against, PIM = Penalty infraction minutes

Regular season											Playoffs				
Season	GP	W	L	OTL	SOL	Pts	GF	GA	PIM	Standing	Year	1st round	2nd round	3rd round	Finals
2008–09	64	22	33	2	7	53	183	231	1376	3rd, Northwest Division	2009	did not qualify			
2009–10	64	43	14	1	6	93	253	197	1334	1st, Northern Conference	2010	—	W, 4–0, MO	W, 4–3, B-S	W, 4–2, ALN
2010–11	66	40	22	1	3	84	210	200	1285	1st, Turner Conference	2011	W, 3–0, DAY	W, 3–2, FW	L, 3–4, COL	—
2011–12	66	38	22	1	5	82	226	176	1142	4th, Turner Conference	2012	—	L, 2–4, FW	—	—
2012–13	66	35	24	2	5	77	177	179	1118	4th, CHL	2013	—	L, 2–4, MO	—	—
2013–14	66	39	23	1	3	82	220	189	1088	4th, CHL	2014	—	L, 3–4, QC	—	—
2014–15	72	37	28	2	5	81	218	206	1229	3rd, Central Division	2015	W, 4–3, QC	L, 2–4, ALN	—	—
2015–16	72	30	35	3	4	67	177	210	974	4th, West Division	2016	did not qualify			
2016–17	72	26	38	8	0	60	215	256	917	7th, Mountain Division	2017	did not qualify			
2017–18	72	25	41	3	3	56	203	268	1161	7th, Mountain Division	2018	did not qualify			
2018–19	72	30	33	5	4	69	168	225	1541	6th, Mountain Division	2019	did not qualify			
2019–20	60	29	25	5	1	64	181	200	974	5th, Mountain Division	2020	Season cancelled due to the COVID-19 pandemic			
2020–21	71	32	35	3	1	68	197	232	847	7th, Western Conference	2021	did not qualify			
2021–22	72	36	25	6	5	83	241	232	888	2nd, Mountain Division	2022	W, 4–1, ALN	L, 2–4, UTA	—	—
2022–23	72	33	34	5	0	71	242	272	973	6th, Mountain Division	2023	did not qualify			
2023–24	72	30	38	4	0	64	236	280	885	6th, Mountain Division	2024	did not qualify			
2024–25	72	31	32	6	3	71	218	265	712	6th, Mountain Division	2025	did not qualify			
