= Quad City Mallards =

Defunct minor professional ice hockey team

- City: Moline, Illinois
- League: IHL (2009–2010); CHL (2010–2014); ECHL (2014–2018)
- Founded: 2009; 17 years ago (in the IHL)
- Home arena: TaxSlayer Center
- Colors: Black, green, orange, white

Franchise history
- 2009–2018: Quad City Mallards

The Quad City Mallards were a minor league professional ice hockey team based in the Quad Cities area of Illinois and Iowa that competed in the International Hockey League, Central Hockey League and ECHL. They were named after the Mallards team that played in the United Hockey League from 1995 to 2007, this Mallards franchise marked their debut in 2009 in the International Hockey League. The Mallards played their home games at TaxSlayer Center in Moline, Illinois.

The Mallards ceased operations at the conclusion of the 2017–18 ECHL season. The Mallards were replaced by the Quad City Storm of the Southern Professional Hockey League the following season.

== History ==
The original Mallards franchise played in the Quad Cities from the 1995–96 season through the 2006–07 season. Their first two seasons were played in the Colonial Hockey League, which was renamed the United Hockey League (UHL) in 1997. The Mallards were an overwhelming success in their first few years, with attendance figures that regularly topped 6,000 per game. Attendance peaked in the 1997–98 season at over 8,500 fans per game, and while it declined, average attendance remained over 6,000 fans per game through the 2001–02 season. It continued to drop until it reached a low of 3,120 fans per game in the Mallards' final UHL season in 2006–07.

In 2009, a new ownership group, headed by Eric Karls, brought the Mallards name back after two seasons.

On May 11, 2011, the Mallards originally ceased operations due to a lack of funding, but almost a month later, Club 9 Sports, a consortium between Chicago-based investment bank Prometheus Capital Partners, LLC, management and consulting firm Tobacco Road Capitalists and sports management and marketing firm ScheerSports, Inc. (headed by former National Basketball Association general manager Carl Scheer) bought the team from former owner Eric Karls and announced the team would return for the 2011–12 Central Hockey League season.

The franchise, as well as the entire CHL, ran into financial difficulties during the 2012–13 season. The entire league was then operated by the T&M Group of Companies, the company that owns Boston Pizza. The Mallards' ownership group, T&M Management Services, was headed by Jordan Melville, son of Boston Pizza founder George Melville. At the end of the season, Melville's organization obtained the Mallards' franchise in June 2013. On August 27, 2013, a new affiliation agreement was announced between the National Hockey League Minnesota Wild, its American Hockey League affiliate Iowa Wild, and the Mallards.

On October 7, 2014, soon before the 2014–15 Central Hockey League season was set to begin, it was announced that the Central Hockey League ceased operations and the Mallards, along with the Allen Americans, Brampton Beast, Missouri Mavericks, Rapid City Rush, Tulsa Oilers and Wichita Thunder, were all approved for expansion membership applications with the ECHL for the 2014–15 season.

In 2017, the Mallards signed a multi-year affiliation with the Vegas Golden Knights, and their AHL affiliate, the Chicago Wolves, for the 2017–18 season, ending their four-year affiliation with the Wild.

The Mallards only played one season with the Golden Knights' affiliation as the team would cease operations. Owner Jordan Melville stated he was folding the team due to losing the passion for operating the team and losing about US$4 million since he became the sole owner in 2013. A new ownership group obtained a team in the Southern Professional Hockey League called the Quad City Storm to replace the Mallards at the TaxSlayer Center for the 2018–19 season.

== Season-by-season records ==
Regular season											Playoffs				
League	Season	GP	W	L	OTL	SOL	Pts	GF	GA	Standing	Year	1st round	2nd round	3rd round	Finals
IHL	2009–10	76	29	35	4	8	70	207	263	6th of 7, IHL	2010	—		Did not qualify	
CHL	2010–11	66	34	31	1	—	69	186	182	7th of 9, Turner	2011	L, 1–3, COL	—	—	—
CHL	2011–12	66	37	27	2	—	76	230	201	5th of 7, Turner	2012	—	Did not qualify		
CHL	2012–13	66	34	26	6	—	74	219	201	6th of 10, CHL	2013	—	L, 1–4, FTW	—	—
CHL	2013–14	66	33	23	10	—	76	219	198	5th of 10, CHL	2014	—	W, 4–3, RC	L, 2–4, ALN	—
ECHL	2014–15	72	37	28	4	3	81	205	186	3rd of 6, Central	2015	L, 3–4, RC	—	—	—
ECHL	2015–16	72	37	29	4	2	80	203	203	3rd of 5, Midwest	2016	L, 0–4, MO	—	—	—
ECHL	2016–17	72	40	28	2	2	84	232	220	3rd of 7, Central	2017	L, 1–4, FW	—	—	—
ECHL	2017–18	72	25	42	4	1	55	196	295	7th of 7, Central	2018	Did not qualify			
