= Allen Americans =

Minor professional ice hockey team

- City: Allen, Texas
- League: ECHL
- Conference: Western
- Division: Mountain
- Founded: 2009 (in the CHL)
- Home arena: Credit Union of Texas Event Center
- Colors: Red, white, navy
- Owners: Myles Jack; LaSonjia Jack
- Head coach: Steve Martinson
- Captain: Brayden Watts
- Media: CW33 Dallas (Television) +, Allen American-Star (Print)
- Affiliates: Ottawa Senators (NHL); Belleville Senators (AHL)
- Website: allenamericans.com

Franchise history
- 2009–present: Allen Americans

Championships
- Regular season titles: 2 (2010–11, 2012–13)
- Division titles: 3 (2009–10, 2010–11, 2014–15)
- Conference titles: 5 (2009–10, 2012–13, 2013–14, 2014–15, 2015–16)
- Ray Miron President's Cup: 2 (2012–13, 2013–14)
- Kelly Cups: 2 (2014–15, 2015–16)

The Allen Americans are a professional ice hockey team headquartered at the Credit Union of Texas Event Center in Allen, Texas, which currently plays in the ECHL. The team was founded in 2009 in the Central Hockey League (CHL) where they played for five seasons, winning the Ray Miron President's Cup twice. The CHL folded in 2014 and the ECHL accepted the remaining CHL teams as members for the 2014–15 season. In their first two seasons in the ECHL, Allen advanced to the Kelly Cup finals, winning the championship in both years. The Americans are affiliated with the National Hockey League's Ottawa Senators and the American Hockey League's Belleville Senators.

== History ==
=== Expansion and the CHL years ===
On April 15, 2009, the Central Hockey League (CHL) announced an expansion team for Allen, to begin play in the 2009–10 season. The new team was owned by Top Shelf, LLC, a group consisting of EXCO Resources chairman Douglas H. Miller and former National Hockey League (NHL) defenseman Steve Duchesne. That same day, the team announced an affiliation with the NHL's Dallas Stars. Through this affiliation, they also affiliated with the Austin-based American Hockey League (AHL)'s Texas Stars.

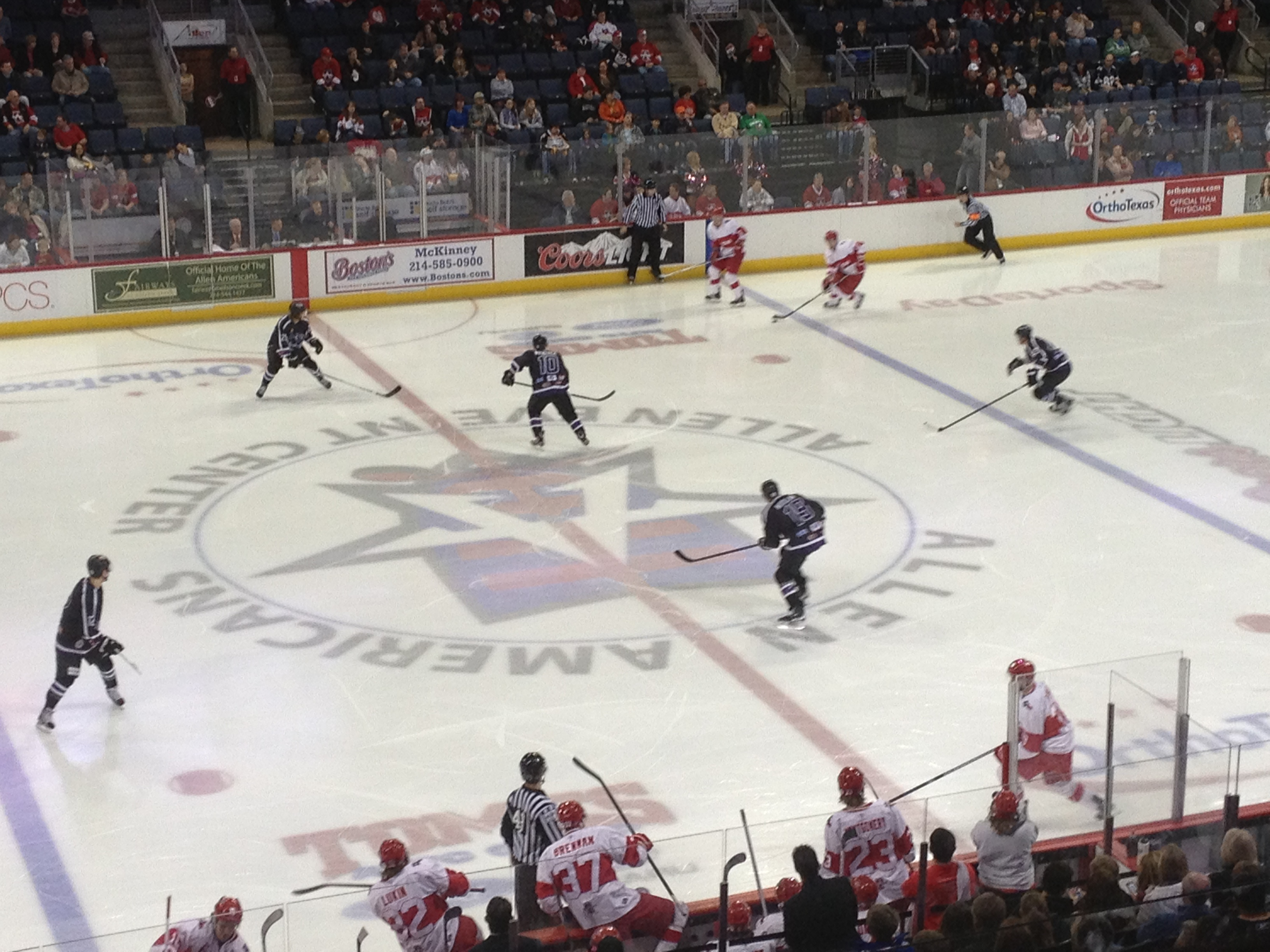
The Fort Worth Brahmas vs. the Americans at the Allen Event Center on January 11, 2010.

On April 27, 2009, the ownership group unveiled the team's name, logo, and colors. On May 12, 2009, the Americans announced Dwight Mullins as their inaugural head coach, along with Bill MacDonald as assistant coach and head of hockey operations. As construction on the Allen Event Center would not be completed in time for the beginning of the CHL season, Allen began the season with a seven-game road streak, winning five, including their first ever game against the Arizona Sundogs 1–0, on a first period Christian Gaudet power play goal. The first game on home ice was not until November 7, 2009, a 4–1 loss to the Corpus Christi IceRays in front of a sellout crowd of 5,808 people. Allen advanced to the playoffs as the number two seed in the Southern Conference in their first season, defeating both the Laredo Bucks and number one seed Odessa Jackalopes in seven games. In the Ray Miron President's Cup finals, they took a 2–1 series lead over the Rapid City Rush, but lost three straight games, losing the series 4–2.

Allen also qualified for the playoffs in the following two seasons, winning the Bud Poile Governors’ Cup regular season title in only their second season in the league. They lost in the conference finals to eventual champions, the Bossier-Shreveport Mudbugs, in 2011, and had a disappointing first round exit to bitter rivals the Texas Brahmas in 2012.

Prior to the Americans' third season, on September 1, 2011, it was announced that the Americans signed a one-year affiliation deal with the Colorado Avalanche of the NHL and by extension the Lake Erie Monsters of the AHL. This agreement officially made the Americans affiliates of the Avalanche after having a working relationship with the Monsters over the previous two years. The affiliation ended after Colorado and Lake Erie moved their affiliation to the now defunct Denver Cutthroats organization.

On May 4, 2012, the Allen Americans announced that former Dallas Stars players Mike Modano, Craig Ludwig, and Ed Belfour partnered up to become minority owners of Top Shelf, LLC. Shortly after, the Allen Americans announced that they would not retain general manager and head coach Dwight Mullins, along with associate coach Bill McDonald. Richard Matvichuk was then announced as the assistant general manager and defensive coach. A month later, the Americans announced Steve Martinson as their new head coach.

After winning their second Bud Poile Governor's Cup regular season title, the Allen Americans went on to win the Ray Miron President's Cup for the first time on May 11, 2013, in front of a sold out crowd. After falling behind 2–0 in the first two periods of game seven against the Wichita Thunder, Allen scored two third period goals to tie the game. In overtime, Todd Robinson scored the winner to give Allen their first championship win.

On May 10, 2014, the Allen Americans became only the third CHL team to win back-to-back Ray Miron President's Cup championships, and the first since the Memphis RiverKings achieved the feat in 2003. Allen scored four second period goals to defeat the Denver Cutthroats 5–2, winning the finals series four games to one in front of a sold out crowd. Less than a week later, the Americans were sold by the Top Shelf ownership group to Stevens Brothers Sports Management, LLC. The Stevens Brothers also owned the CHL's Tulsa Oilers and Wichita Thunder.

=== Move to the ECHL ===
On October 7, 2014, soon before the 2014–15 CHL season was set to begin, it was announced that the Central Hockey League ceased operations and the Americans, along with the Brampton Beast, Quad City Mallards, Missouri Mavericks, Rapid City Rush, Tulsa Oilers and Wichita Thunder, were all approved for expansion membership applications with the ECHL for the 2014–15 season. On October 14, 2014, the Americans announced affiliations with the San Jose Sharks and Worcester Sharks (and later the San Jose Barracuda).

The Americans finished its inaugural ECHL season atop the Central Division which encompassed the former CHL members, having the second-best overall regular-season performance and the best offense in the league, with 192 goals. During the 2015 playoffs, they beat both the Tulsa Oilers and Rapid City Rush to reach the Western Conference Finals against the Ontario Reign. The Americans would win the first game before losing the following three games to the Reign. The Americans would come back to win the following three games in order to clinch the series. They were the fifth team in ECHL postseason history to win a series after trailing 3-games-to-1. On June 14, 2015, the Americans defeated the South Carolina Stingrays in seven games to win their first Kelly Cup. They are the first team to advance to and win the Kelly Cup in their first ECHL season since the Idaho Steelheads accomplished the feat in 2004.

Allen finished its second season in the ECHL in second place in the newly reorganized Central Division, behind the Brabham Cup champions Missouri Mavericks, earning the number four seed in the Western Conference. After trailing 3-games-to-2 in the opening series with the Idaho Steelheads, Allen forced a game seven at home, with Tristan King scoring the series-winning goal in overtime. The Americans went on to defeat number one seed Missouri by 4-games-to-2, and retain the Western Conference championship, defeating the number two seed Fort Wayne Komets by 4-games-to-1, becoming the first team to make back-to-back trips to the ECHL finals since 1994, and the first-ever since the switch from the Riley Cup to the Kelly Cup. Allen then became the first team since the Toledo Storm in 1994 to win consecutive ECHL championships, by defeating the Wheeling Nailers 4-games-to-2, celebrating their fourth consecutive championship across two leagues on home ice on June 9, 2016.

On February 23, 2017, the ECHL announced that the Americans had been sold by the Stevens brothers to Allen Hockey Team, LLC, led by Reading Royals' owner Jack Gulati. As part of the transition, Gulati planned to rebrand the team to be more inclusive of the Dallas-Fort Worth area while keeping the Americans name and keeping the team at the Allen Events Center. The organization held a name-the-team contest from March 31 to June 30, 2017, but nothing further was announced as of the end the 2017–18 season.

Following the 2018–19 season, the Americans missed the playoffs for the first time in franchise history. In July 2019, owner Gulati also announced that the team for sale before the 2019–20 season due to health issues in his family at the time and thought it would be better for the team to have local owners instead of an absentee owner. He also stated that if the team was not sold before the start of the season, he would not sell it during the season.

The Americans were again leading the division in the 2019–20 season with a 40–14–0–6 record before the season was cancelled due to the COVID-19 pandemic. Steve Martinson was named General Manager of the Year, while defenseman Alex Breton and forward Tyler Sheehy were named to the All-ECHL First Team. The Americans were one of 14 ECHL teams to elect to play the pandemic-delayed 2020–21 season. They finished with the top seed in the Western Conference, but were eliminated by the Fort Wayne Komets in the conference finals of the 2021 Kelly Cup playoffs.

In the 2021–22 season, the Americans became the first ECHL affiliate of the NHL expansion team, the Seattle Kraken.

=== Post-Martinson Era (2022–2025) ===
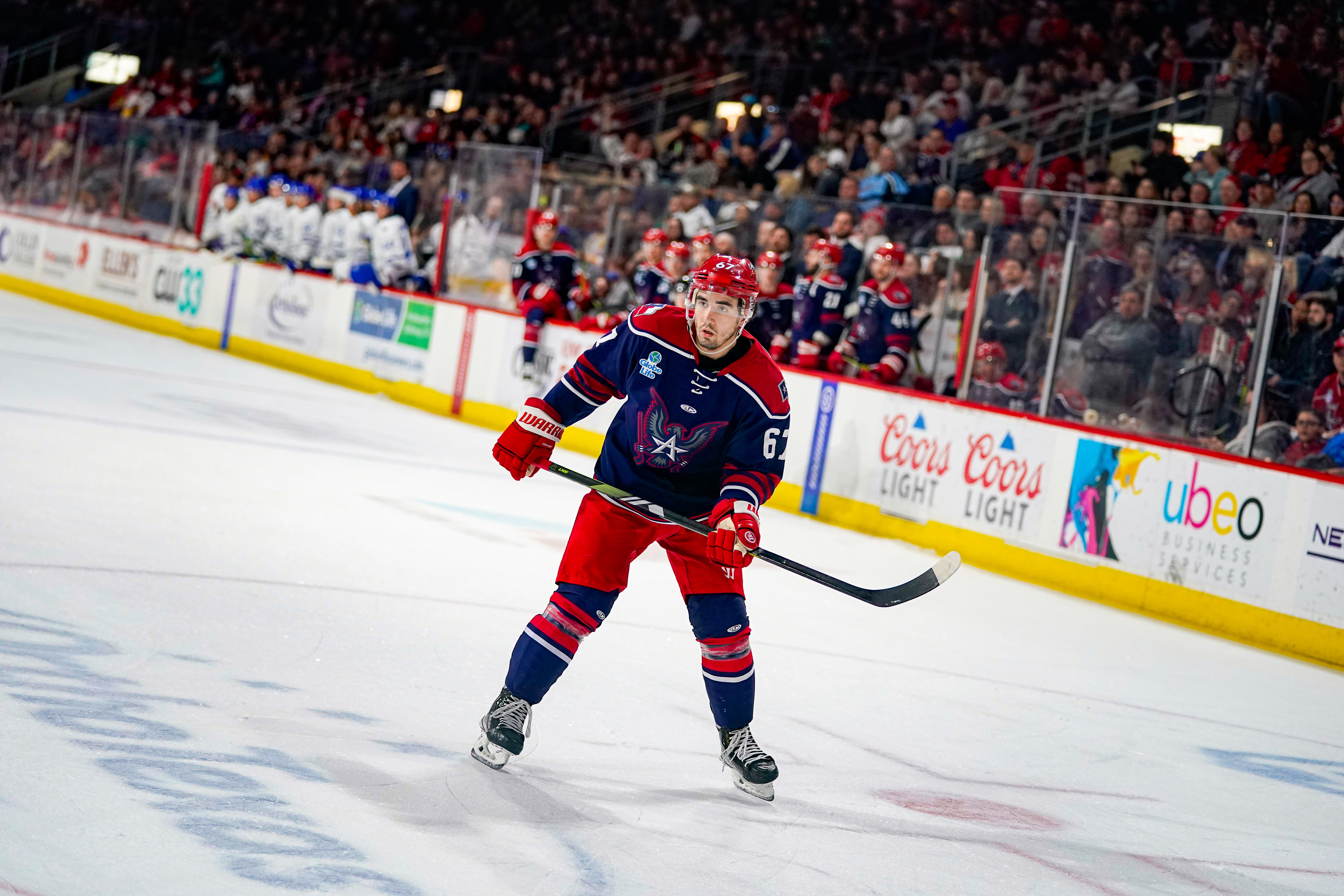
Allen's Hank Crone - 2023 ECHL MVP winner

The 2022–23 ECHL season was the first for head coach for Chad Costello and President Jonny Mydra. On August 24, 2022, the Americans announced they had reached a deal to become the new ECHL affiliate of the Ottawa Senators of the NHL and their AHL affiliate, the Belleville Senators. Later that offseason, they announced the first major television deal in franchise history, agreeing to terms with Dallas TV station CW33. With a reach of over 2.5 million households, it became one of the largest television deals in minor league sports. The Americans finished the 2022–23 season second in the Mountain Division, defeating the Kansas City Mavericks in the first round of the playoffs. Rookie Hank Crone won the ECHL regular season MVP, and the team set their franchise record for season ticket sales.

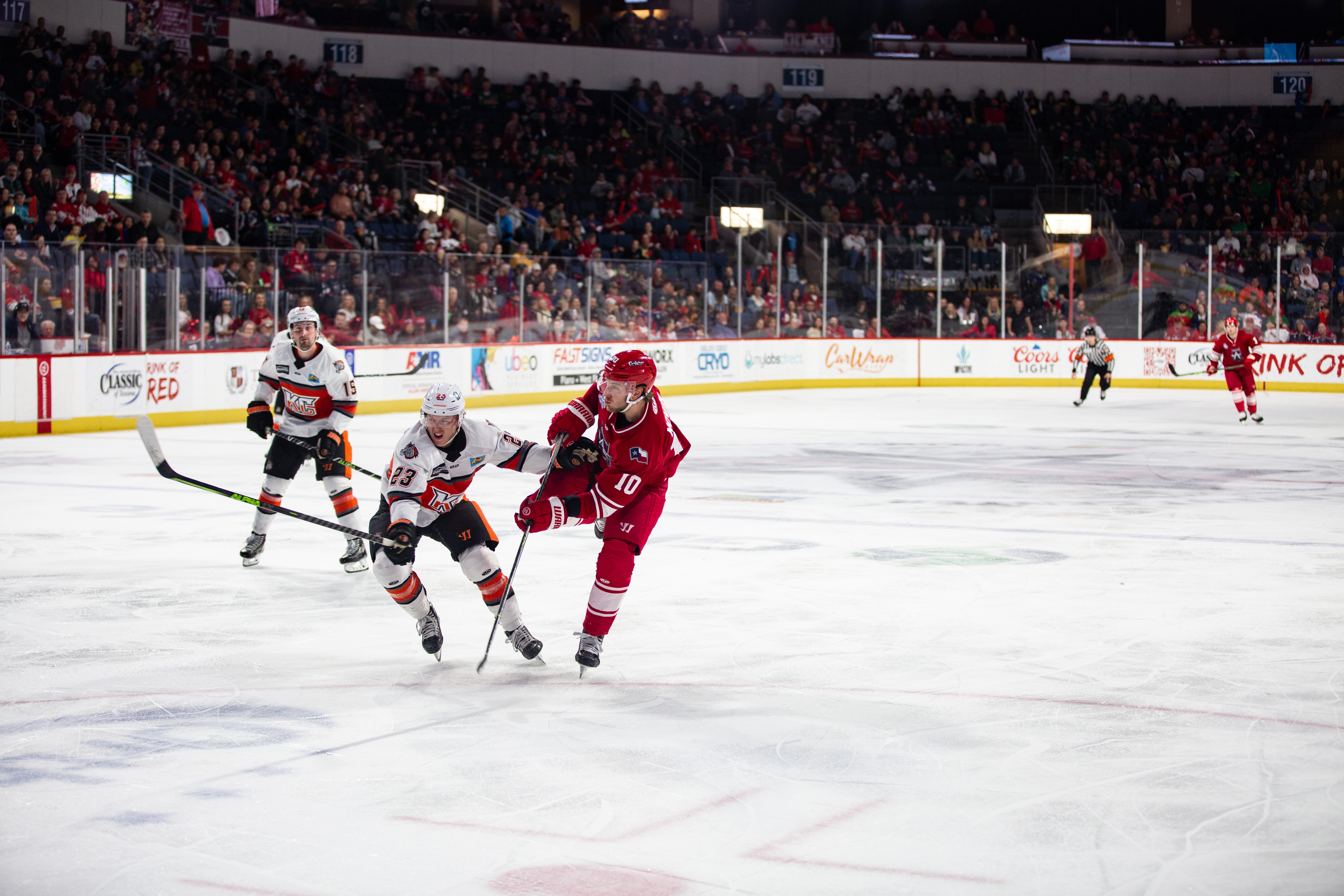
Americans forward Jakov Novak during Round 1 of the 2023 Kelly Cup Playoffs

On October 4, 2023, it was announced that the team was sold to Myles Jack and his mother LaSonjia Jack, becoming the first ever African-American majority owners in ECHL history. The Americans finished the 2023–24 season third in the Mountain Division, falling to the Idaho Steelheads in the first round of the playoffs. The organization dismissed Costello as head coach in May 2024. A search for a new head coach began immediately following the release of Costello, and B. J. Adams of the Ontario Hockey League (OHL) was officially hired on June 12, 2024. On July 31, the Americans announced a new affiliation with the Utah Mammoth of the NHL and the Tucson Roadrunners of the AHL.

Despite breaking their franchise attendance record in the 2024-25 season with 4,573 fans per game, the team missed the playoffs for just the third time in franchise history, finishing last in the Mountain Division. The Americans subsequently dismissed their coaching staff and began the search for new on-ice leadership.

=== Second Martinson iteration (2025–present) ===
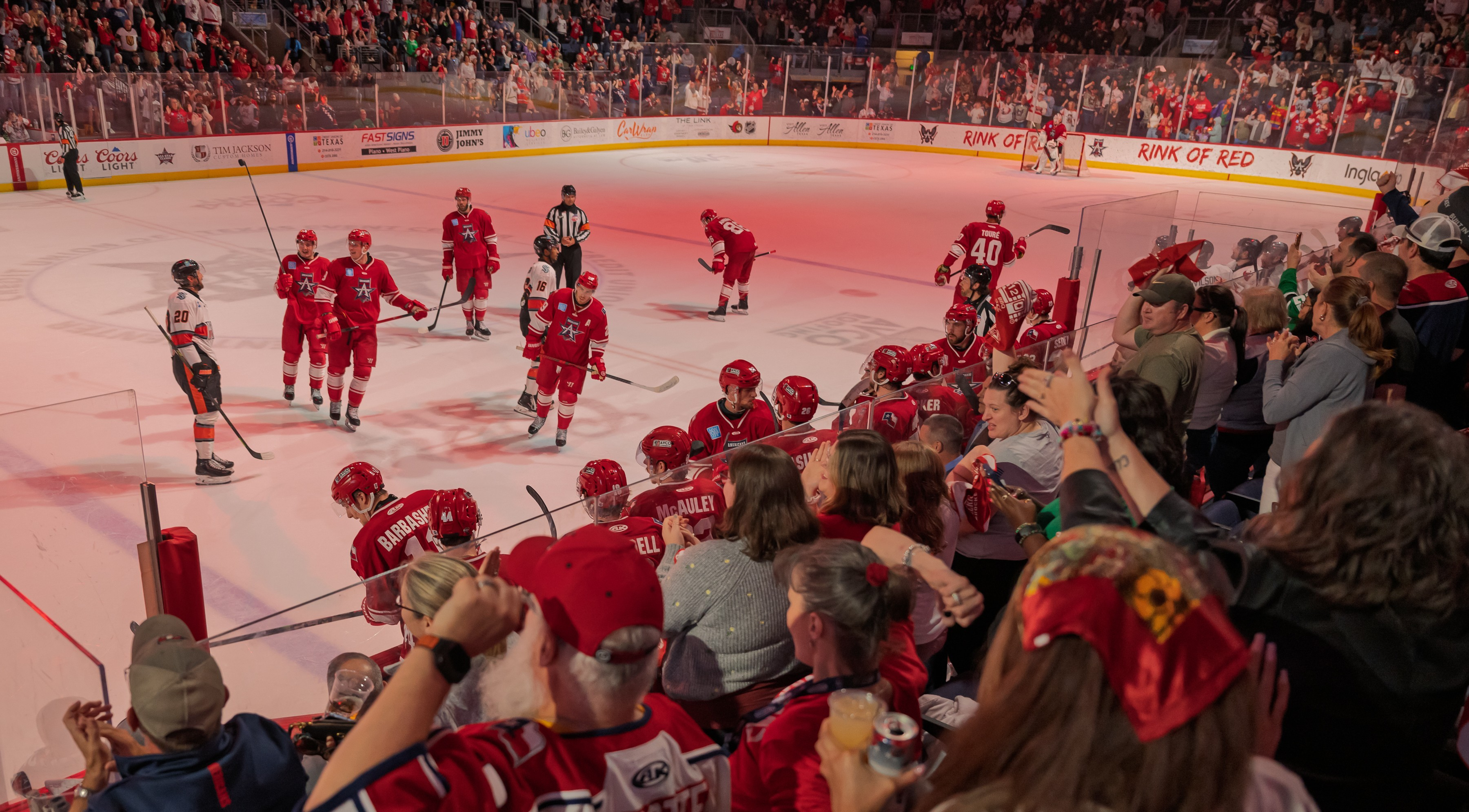
Americans fans celebrate a goal during the 2025-26 season

On May 12, 2025, the team announced the return of Steve Martinson as head coach and general manager.

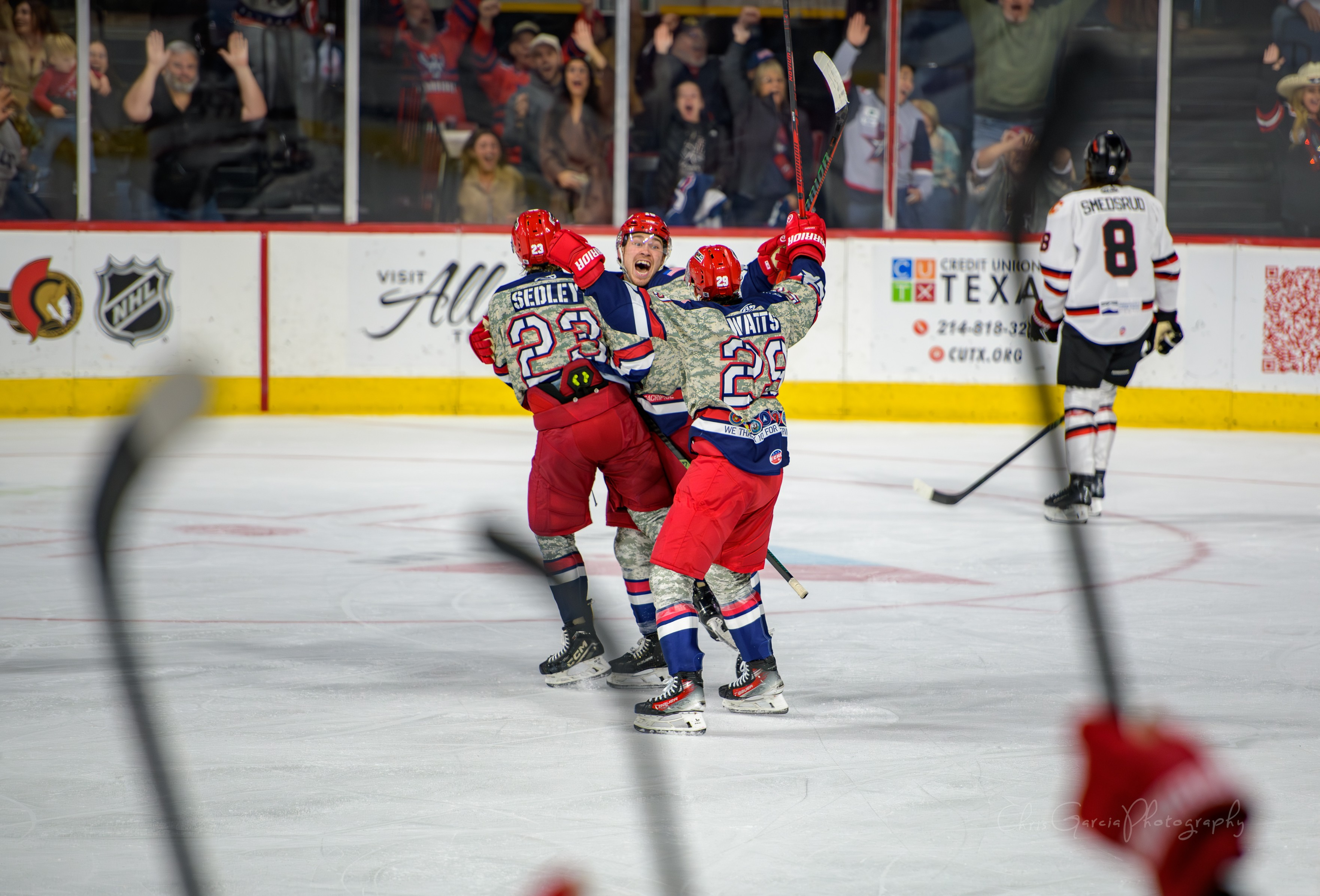
2025-26 ECHL Sportsman of the Year Brayden Watts celebrates a goal

On August 27, 2025, it was announced that the Allen Americans have reached a deal to, once again, be the official affiliate of the Ottawa Senators in the NHL, and the Belleville Senators of the AHL starting with the 2025–26 season. On April 21, 2026, it was announced that the Ottawa Senators extended their affiliation with the Americans through the 2026-27 season.

The Americans finished the 2025-26 regular season with 92 standings points, good for second place in the Mountain Division. Off the ice the team set a new record for attendance with 4,845 fans per game, and set franchise highs for local television and streaming viewership. Danny Katic was named to the 2025-26 All-ECHL First Team, and Brayden Watts was named the league's Sportsman of the Year. After defeating the Idaho Steelheads in the first round of the playoffs, the team ultimately fell to the Kansas City Mavericks in the Mountain Division Finals.

In August of 2026, it was announced that multiple members of the Americans front office were taking new roles in bigger leagues, including President Jonny Mydra moving to a similar role with the Dallas Renegades, and Head Athletic Trainer Jordan Dutton being added to the Anaheim Ducks training staff. It was also clarified that Steve Martinson had agreed to return for another season, and that Owner LaSonjia Jack would begin to run day-to-day operations of the team.

== Mascot and dance team ==
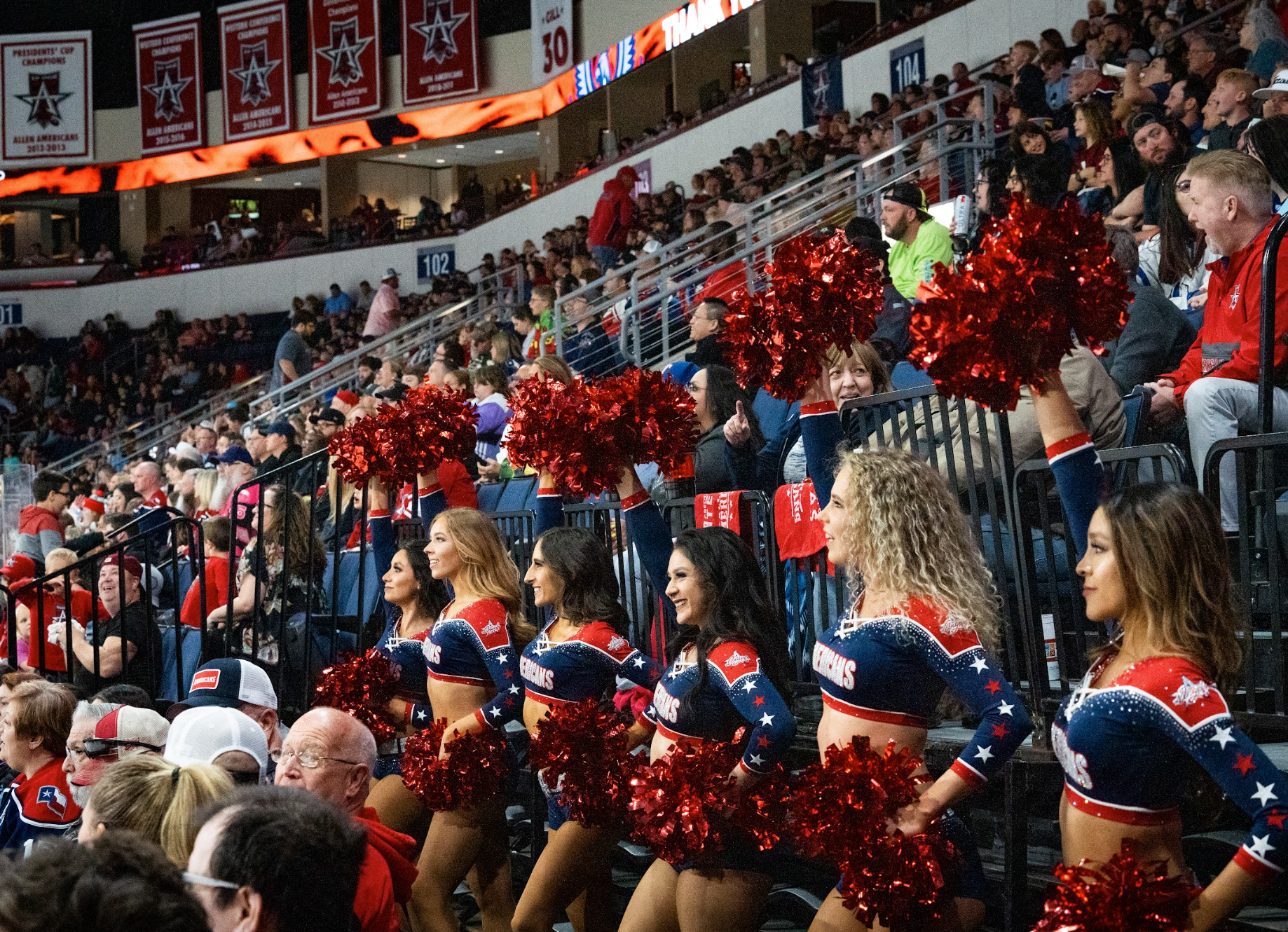
The "Ice Angels" cheer on the Americans during a 2023 regular season game

At the opening weekend of the 2010 season, the Americans introduced their mascot, Biscuit the American Bulldog, who wears the jersey number "K9". Biscuit has remained the Americans mascot ever since.

The Americans are also known for their dance team, the "Allen American Ice Angels". Founded the same year as the team, the group performs at every home game and makes various community appearances. The group is considered a high-level feeder team for National Football League and NHL dance teams.

== Season-by-season records ==
| Regular season | | | | | | | | | | | Playoffs | | | | |
| Season | GP | W | L | OTL | SOL | Pts | GF | GA | PIM | Standing | Year | 1st round | 2nd round | 3rd round | Finals |
|---|---|---|---|---|---|---|---|---|---|---|---|---|---|---|---|
Central Hockey League
| 2009–10 | 64 | 42 | 17 | 2 | 3 | 89 | 210 | 183 | 1,229 | 2nd; Southern Conf. | 2010 | BYE | W, 4–3, LAR | W, 4–3, ODE | L, 2–4, RC |
| 2010–11 | 66 | 47 | 16 | 1 | 2 | 97 | 271 | 211 | 1,184 | 1st; Berry Conf. | 2011 | W, 3–1, TEX | W, 3–2, ODE | L, 1–4, BS | — |
| 2011–12 | 66 | 39 | 18 | 3 | 6 | 87 | 212 | 175 | 1,336 | 2nd; Berry Conf. | 2012 | — | L, 2–4, TEX | — | — |
| 2012–13 | 66 | 39 | 18 | 4 | 5 | 87 | 210 | 176 | 1,571 | 1st; CHL | 2013 | — | W, 4–1, DEN | W, 4–3, MO | W, 4–3, WIC |
| 2013–14 | 66 | 39 | 22 | 1 | 4 | 83 | 249 | 214 | 1,498 | 3rd; CHL | 2014 | — | W, 4–1, BRM | W, 4–2, QC | W, 4–1, DEN |
ECHL
| 2014–15 | 72 | 48 | 14 | 6 | 4 | 106 | 292 | 203 | 1,644 | 1st; Central Div. | 2015 | W, 4–1, TUL | W, 4–2, RC | W, 4–3. ONT | W, 4–3, SC |
| 2015–16 | 72 | 41 | 24 | 3 | 4 | 89 | 222 | 204 | 1,189 | 2nd; Central Div. | 2016 | W, 4–3, IDH | W, 4–2, MO | W, 4–1, FW | W, 4–2, WHL |
| 2016–17 | 72 | 49 | 17 | 4 | 2 | 104 | 294 | 203 | 1,432 | 1st; Mountain Div. | 2017 | W, 4–1, UTA | L, 2–4, COL | — | — |
| 2017–18 | 72 | 35 | 29 | 6 | 2 | 78 | 235 | 232 | 1,411 | 3rd; Mountain Div. | 2018 | L, 3–4, IDH | — | — | — |
| 2018–19 | 72 | 25 | 41 | 4 | 2 | 56 | 208 | 269 | 1,691 | 7th; Mountain Div. | 2019 | did not qualify | | | |
| 2019–20 | 62 | 40 | 14 | 6 | 2 | 88 | 247 | 195 | 745 | 1st; Mountain Div. | 2020 | Season cancelled due to COVID-19 pandemic | | | |
| 2020–21 | 72 | 45 | 23 | 3 | 1 | 94 | 236 | 196 | 996 | 1st; Western Conf. | 2021 | — | W, 3–0, UTA | L, 1–3, FW | — |
| 2021–22 | 72 | 35 | 28 | 8 | 1 | 79 | 240 | 244 | 1,000 | 3rd; Mountain Div. | 2022 | L, 1–4, RC | — | — | — |
| 2022–23 | 72 | 37 | 32 | 2 | 1 | 77 | 260 | 263 | 1,172 | 2nd; Mountain Div. | 2023 | W, 4–2, KCM | L, 1–4, IDH | — | — |
| 2023–24 | 72 | 33 | 35 | 3 | 1 | 70 | 233 | 276 | 1,211 | 3rd; Mountain Div. | 2024 | L, 1–4, IDH | — | — | — |
| 2024–25 | 72 | 16 | 45 | 8 | 3 | 43 | 175 | 311 | 941 | 8th; Mountain Div. | 2025 | did not qualify | | | |
| 2025–26 | 72 | 43 | 23 | 6 | 0 | 92 | 268 | 209 | 899 | 2nd; Mountain Div. | 2026 | W, 4–1, IDH | L, 0–4, KCM | — | — |
