= Kansas City Mavericks =

Minor league ice hockey team in Missouri, US

- City: Independence, Missouri
- League: ECHL
- Conference: Western
- Division: Mountain
- Founded: 2009 (in the CHL)
- Home arena: Cable Dahmer Arena
- Colors: Black, orange, silver, white
- Owner: Lamar Hunt Jr.
- General manager: Tad O'Had
- Head coach: Tad O'Had
- Affiliates: Seattle Kraken (NHL); Coachella Valley Firebirds (AHL)

Franchise history
- 2009–2017: Missouri Mavericks
- 2017–present: Kansas City Mavericks

Championships
- Regular season titles: 4 (2013–14, 2015–16, 2023–24, 2025–26)
- Division titles: 4 (2015–16, 2023–24, 2024–25, 2025–26)
- Conference titles: 2 (2023–24, 2025–26)

The Kansas City Mavericks are an ice hockey team in the ECHL. Founded in 2009 as the Missouri Mavericks of the CHL, the team plays in Independence, Missouri, a suburb of Kansas City, Missouri, at the Cable Dahmer Arena.

== History ==
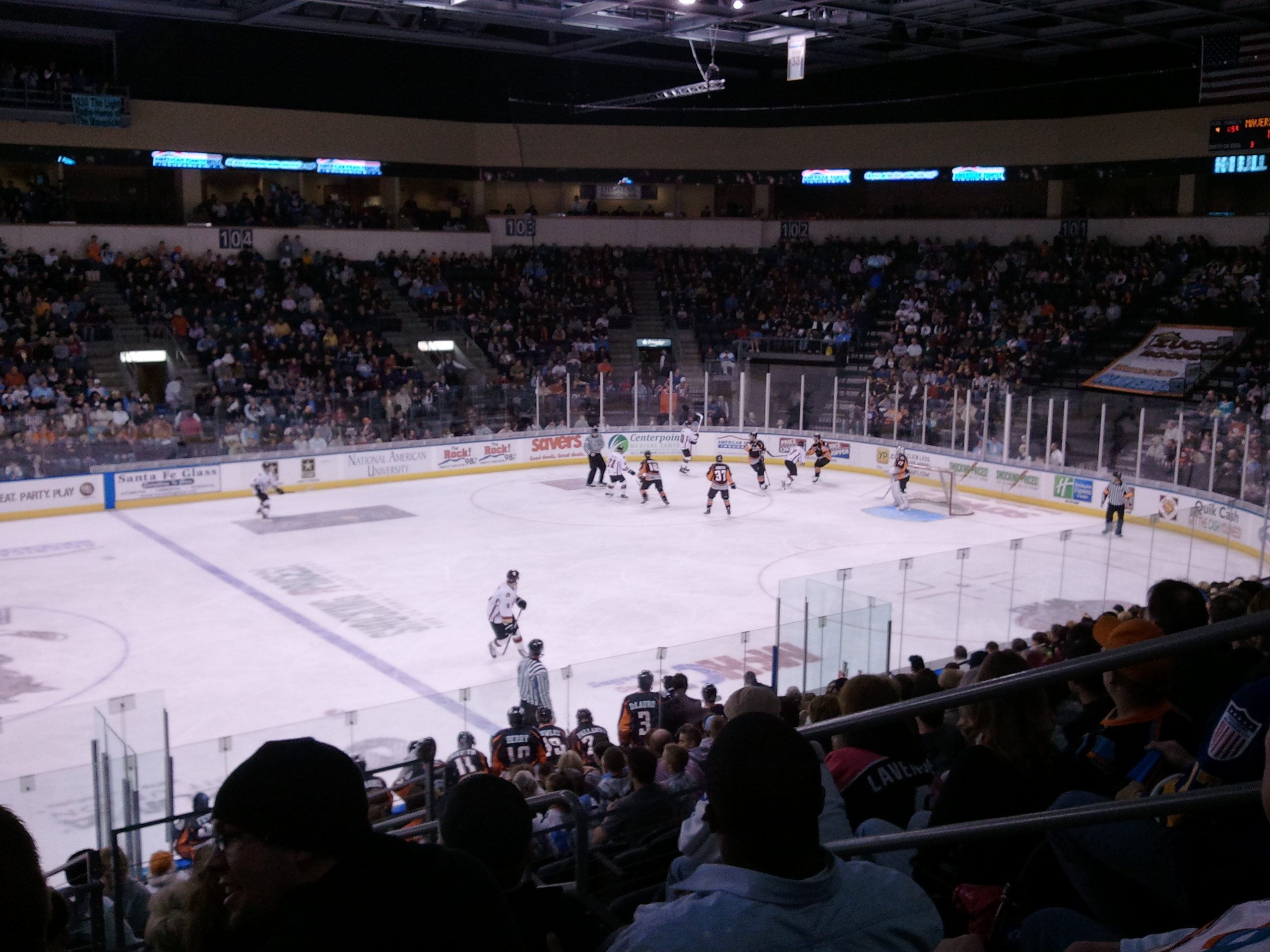
Rapid City Rush vs Missouri Mavericks at Silverstein Eye Centers Arena on February 18, 2011.

On April 16, 2009, the Central Hockey League announced an expansion team for Independence, to begin play in the 2009–10 season. The new organization teamed up with local newspaper The Examiner to hold a name-the-team contest until May 11. The Missouri Mavericks' name, logo, and colors were unveiled on June 24. On May 29, 2009, it was reported that Scott Hillman would be the Mavericks' first head coach, resigning from his same position with the Southern Professional Hockey League's Knoxville Ice Bears to do so. In his time with the Ice Bears, Hillman led them to two consecutive SPHL President's Cup championships and Coffey Trophies (awarded for the most regular-season points). On November 13, 2009, the team played their home opener before a crowd of 5,760 people at the Independence Events Center.

On September 17, 2011, the Mavericks announced an affiliation agreement with the Chicago Wolves of the American Hockey League for the 2011–12 season. This agreement would be renewed in one-year contracts until 2015.

On May 24, 2012, the Mavericks extended head coach Scott Hillman's contract for two additional years through the 2013–14 season. On July 31, 2012, the Mavericks announced an agreement with Entercom to have all 66 games for the 2012–13 season broadcast on the radio on 1660 KUDL.

On May 21, 2014, Hillman announced his resignation from the Mavericks and soon after was named as the first head coach for the expansion Indy Fuel of the ECHL. In June, the Mavericks hired Richard Matvichuk as the organization's new coach.

On October 7, 2014, shortly before the 2014–15 Central Hockey League season was set to begin, it was announced that the CHL had ceased operations and the Mavericks, along with the Allen Americans, Brampton Beast, Quad City Mallards, Rapid City Rush, Tulsa Oilers and Wichita Thunder, were all approved for expansion membership application into the ECHL for the 2014–15 season.

On February 5, 2015, Lamar Hunt Jr., son of Kansas City Chiefs' founder Lamar Hunt, bought a 100 percent ownership stake in the Missouri Mavericks.

On June 11, 2015, the Mavericks announced they had signed a two-year affiliation deal with the New York Islanders. The Mavericks then served as the Islanders' secondary minor league affiliate, behind the Bridgeport Islanders of the American Hockey League.

On June 2, 2016, head coach Richard Matvichuk resigned after leading the Mavericks for two seasons, a regular season championship, and named ECHL coach of the year in 2015–16. He left the organization to become the head coach of the Western Hockey League's Prince George Cougars. He was replaced by John-Scott Dickson, who had played for the team from 2011 to 2015 before joining the coaching staff as an assistant coach in 2015–16. Also, beginning with the 2016–17 season, the Mavericks and St. Louis Blues entered into a working agreement for cross-promoting hockey in Missouri and Kansas. However, the Islanders/Tigers organization still remained the Mavericks affiliate for player development.

On March 11, 2017, the Missouri Mavericks announced the team would be renamed the Kansas City Mavericks beginning in the 2017–18 season. Also prior to the 2017–18 season, their affiliation with the Islanders ended when that organization affiliated with the expansion Worcester Railers. On June 8, 2017, Kansas City affiliated with the Calgary Flames (NHL) and the Stockton Heat (AHL).

In his fourth season as head coach, Dickson was fired on January 30, 2020, while the team was in last place in their division. After the season ended, the Mavericks hired Florida Everblades' assistant Tad O'Had as the head coach.

On July 28, 2022, the Mavericks announced a new affiliation with the Seattle Kraken and Seattle's AHL affiliate, the Coachella Valley Firebirds.

On May 27, 2024, the Mavericks won the western conference and advanced to the 2024 Kelly Cup finals for the first time in club history.

== Season-by-season records ==
Regular season											Playoffs				
Season	GP	W	L	OTL	SOL	Pts	GF	GA	PIM	Standing	Year	1st round	2nd round	3rd round	Kelly Cup
2009–10 (CHL)	64	31	27	6	—	68	200	220	1589	5th, Northern Conf.	2010	W, 2–1, MRK	L, 0–4, RC	—	—
2010–11 (CHL)	66	37	23	6	—	80	213	173	1197	4th, Turner Conf.	2011	W, 3–2, WIC	L, 1–3, COL	—	—
2011–12 (CHL)	66	39	21	6	—	84	223	200	1048	3rd, Turner Conf.	2012	—	W, 4–0, EVN	L, 3–4, FW	—
2012–13 (CHL)	66	35	25	6	—	76	217	222	991	5th, CHL	2013	—	W, 4–2, RC	L, 3–4, ALN	—
2013–14 (CHL)	66	44	20	2	—	90	238	184	1012	1st, CHL	2014	—	L, 2–4, ARZ	—	—
2014–15 (ECHL)	72	28	35	5	4	65	192	231	1426	6th, Central Div.	2015	did not qualify			
2015–16 (ECHL)	72	52	15	3	2	109	234	162	855	1st, Central Div.	2016	W, 4–0, QC	L, 2–4, ALN	—	—
2016–17 (ECHL)	72	33	30	4	5	75	233	241	1040	5th, Mountain Div.	2017	did not qualify			
2017–18 (ECHL)	72	34	32	4	2	74	204	223	904	6th, Central Div.	2018	did not qualify			
2018–19 (ECHL)	72	36	30	4	2	78	234	228	993	4th, Mountain Div.	2019	L, 3–4, TUL	—	—	—
2019–20 (ECHL)	61	24	32	4	1	53	167	217	721	7th, Mountain Div.	2020	Season cancelled due to the COVID-19 pandemic			
2020–21 (ECHL)	72	31	31	8	2	72	205	226	806	6th, Western Conf.	2021	did not qualify			
2021–22 (ECHL)	72	32	33	5	2	71	210	243	1482	6th, Mountain Div.	2022	did not qualify			
2022–23 (ECHL)	72	34	30	6	2	76	222	224	939	3rd, Mountain Div.	2023	L, 2–4, ALN	—	—	—
2023–24 (ECHL)	72	54	12	4	2	114	305	202	688	1st, Mountain Div.	2024	W, 4–0, TUL	W, 4–1, IDH	W, 4–2, TOL	L, 1–4, FLA
2024–25 (ECHL)	72	49	18	4	1	103	256	178	946	1st, Mountain Div.	2025	W, 4–2, TUL	W, 4–0, TAH	L, 1–4, TOL	—
2025–26 (ECHL)	72	55	12	3	2	115	255	159	857	1st, Mountain Div.	2026	W, 4–0, TAH	W, 4–0, ALN	W, 4–2, FW	L, 2–4, FLA
CHL totals	328	186	116	26	—	398	1091	999	5837						
ECHL totals	853	462	310	54	27	1005	2717	2534	11657						

== Players and personnel ==
=== Team captains ===
- Tyler Fleck, 2009
- Carlyle Lewis, 2009–11
- Sebastien Thinel, 2011–2015
- Trevor Ludwig, 2015–16
- Andrew Courtney, 2016–17
- Tyler Elbrecht, 2017–18
- Rocco Carzo, 2018–2020
- Rob Bordson, 2020–21
- Lane Scheidl, 2021–22
- Nick Pastujov, 2022–23
- Jake Jaremko, 2023-24
- David Cotton, 2024-25

=== Notable alumni ===
- Kyle Burroughs
- Ville Husso
- Ross Johnston
- Maxime Lagace
- Jed Ortmeyer
- Carter Verhaeghe

Preceded by Toledo Walleye	Brabham Cup; Champions; 2015–16	Succeeded by Toledo Walleye
