= List of IIHF World Junior Championship gold medal games =

This is a list of gold medals games for the IIHF World Junior Championship (World Juniors), an international hockey tournament for players under the age of 20, held each year in late December to early January.

== List of finals ==
Year	Champions	Score	Runner–up	Venue	Host city	Attendance	References
1974–1977: no gold medal game held
1978	Soviet Union	5–2	Sweden	?	Montreal, Canada	?	
1979–1995: no gold medal game held
1996	Canada	4–1	Sweden	Conte Forum	Boston, United States	5,781	
1997	Canada	2–0	United States	Patinoire des Vernets	Geneva, Switzerland	4,269	
1998	Finland	2–1 (OT)	Russia	Hartwall Arena	Helsinki, Finland	13,665	
1999	Russia	3–2 (OT)	Canada	Winnipeg Arena	Winnipeg, Canada	13,225	
2000	Czech Republic	1–0 (SO)	Russia	Skellefteå Kraft Arena	Skellefteå, Sweden	3,857	
2001	Czech Republic	2–1	Finland	Luzhniki Minor Arena	Moscow, Russia	6,400	
2002	Russia	5–4	Canada	CEZ Arena	Pardubice, Czech Republic	9,130	
2003	Russia	4–3	Canada	Halifax Metro Centre	Halifax, Canada	10,594	
2004	United States	4–3	Canada	Helsinki Ice Hall	Helsinki, Finland	7,364	
2005	Canada	6–1	Russia	Ralph Engelstad Arena	Grand Forks, United States	11,862	
2006	Canada	5–0	Russia	General Motors Place	Vancouver, Canada	18,630	
2007	Canada	4–2	Russia	Ejendals Arena	Leksand, Sweden	5,223	
2008	Canada	3–2 (OT)	Sweden	ČEZ Aréna	Pardubice, Czech Republic	7,480	
2009	Canada	5–1	Sweden	Scotiabank Place	Ottawa, Canada	20,380	
2010	United States	6–5 (OT)	Canada	Credit Union Centre	Saskatoon, Canada	15,171	
2011	Russia	5–3	Canada	HSBC Arena	Buffalo, United States	18,690	
2012	Sweden	1–0 (OT)	Russia	Scotiabank Saddledome	Calgary, Canada	18,722	
2013	United States	3–1	Sweden	Ufa Arena	Ufa, Russia	6,001	
2014	Finland	3–2 (OT)	Sweden	Malmö Arena	Malmö, Sweden	12,023	
2015	Canada	5–4	Russia	Air Canada Centre	Toronto, Canada	19,014	
2016	Finland	4–3 (OT)	Russia	Hartwall Arena	Helsinki, Finland	13,479	
2017	United States	5–4 (SO)	Canada	Bell Centre	Montreal, Canada	20,173	
2018	Canada	3–1	Sweden	KeyBank Center	Buffalo, United States	17,544	
2019	Finland	3–2	United States	Rogers Arena	Vancouver, Canada	17,206	
2020	Canada	4–3	Russia	Ostravar Aréna	Ostrava, Czech Republic	8,693	
2021	United States	2–0	Canada	Rogers Place	Edmonton, Canada	0	
2022	Canada	3–2 (OT)	Finland	Rogers Place	Edmonton, Canada	13,327	
2023	Canada	3–2 (OT)	Czech Republic	Scotiabank Centre	Halifax, Canada	10,735	
2024	United States	6–2	Sweden	Scandinavium	Gothenburg, Sweden	11,512	
2025	United States	4–3 (OT)	Finland	Canadian Tire Centre	Ottawa, Canada	16,822	
2026	Sweden	4–2	Czech Republic	Grand Casino Arena	Saint Paul, United States	9,753	
2027				Rogers Place	Edmonton, Canada		

== Statistics ==
=== Appearances by country ===
Team	App.	W	L
Canada	20	12	8
United States	9	7	2
Russia (Note: Includes 1978 final played by the Soviet Union)	14	5	9
Finland	7	4	3
Sweden	3	7	10
Czech Republic	4	2	2

=== Overtime winning goals ===
List of overtime goalscorers in gold medal games
Tournament	Name	Team	Time	Opposing goalie	Opposing team	Score
1998	Niklas Hagman	Finland	73:41	Denis Khlopotnov	Russia	2–1
1999	Artem Chubarov	Russia	65:13	Roberto Luongo	Canada	3–2
2008	Matthew Halischuk	Canada	63:36	Jhonas Enroth	Sweden	3–2
2010	John Carlson	United States	64:31	Martin Jones	Canada	6–5
2012	Mika Zibanejad	Sweden	70:09	Andrey Makarov	Russia	1–0
2014	Rasmus Ristolainen	Finland	69:42	Oscar Dansk	Sweden	3–2
2016	Kasperi Kapanen	Finland	61:33	Alexandar Georgiev	Russia	4–3
2022	Kent Johnson	Canada	63:20	Juha Jatkola	Finland	3–2
2023	Dylan Guenther	Canada	66:22	Tomáš Suchánek	Czechia	3–2
2025	Teddy Stiga	United States	68:04	Petteri Rimpinen	Finland	4–3
