= Maxim Balmochnykh =

Russian ice hockey player (born 1979)

- Born: March 7, 1979 (age 47) Lipetsk, Soviet Union
- Height: 6 ft 1 in (185 cm)
- Weight: 200 lb (91 kg; 14 st 4 lb)
- Position: Left wing
- Shot: Left
- Played for: HC Lada Togliatti; Mighty Ducks of Anaheim; Severstal Cherepovets; HC Dinamo Minsk; Metallurg Novokuznetsk; HK Gomel; HC Shakhtyor Soligorsk; HK Brest
- NHL draft: 45th overall, 1997; Mighty Ducks of Anaheim
- Playing career: 1995–2013

Maxim Vasilievich Balmochnykh (born March 7, 1979) is a Russian former professional ice hockey winger who played 6 games in the National Hockey League (NHL).

== Playing career ==
Balmochnykh began his career with his hometown team HC Lipetsk of the Vysshaya Liga before moving to the Russian Superleague's HC Lada Togliatti. He was drafted in the second round, 45th overall, by the Mighty Ducks of Anaheim in the 1997 NHL entry draft. After being drafted, Balmochnykh made his North American debut with the Quebec Remparts of the QMJHL in the 1998–99 season. He then joined the Ducks organization and was assigned to the Cincinnati Mighty Ducks of the American Hockey League. His call up to the NHL came during the 2000–01 season, during which he played six games for the Mighty Ducks, scoring one assist. He spent the next two seasons in Cincinnati before he was traded to the New Jersey Devils on July 6, 2002, with Jeff Friesen and Oleg Tverdovsky for Petr Sýkora, Jean-Francois Damphousse, Mike Commodore, and Igor Pohanka.

Balmochnykh returned to Russia in 2002 with Severstal Cherepovets while New Jersey retained his NHL rights. He returned to the Devils the next season but spent the entire season in the AHL for the Albany River Rats.

Balmochnykh became a free agent in 2004 and returned to Russia permanently, rejoining HK Lipetsk. After two seasons in the Vysshaya Liga, Lipetsk were relegated to the Pervaya Liga, the country's third-tier league and Balmochnykh moved to Belarus with HC Dynamo Minsk before returning to the Russian Superleague with Metallurg Novokuznetsk. After a disappointing season, he was released and he returned to Dynamo Minsk before signing with HK Gomel in 2008. He then rejoined Dinamo Minsk, who were now playing in the newly formed Kontinental Hockey League.

== Career statistics ==
=== Regular season and playoffs ===
| | | | Regular season | | | | | Playoffs |
| Season | Team | League | GP | G | A | Pts | PIM | GP | G | A | Pts | PIM |
|---|---|---|---|---|---|---|---|---|---|---|---|---|
| 1994–95 | HC Lipetsk | RUS.2 | 4 | 0 | 1 | 1 | 4 | — | — | — | — | — |
| 1995–96 | HC Lipetsk | RUS.2 | 43 | 12 | 1 | 13 | 32 | — | — | — | — | — |
| 1996–97 | Lada Togliatti | RSL | 18 | 6 | 1 | 7 | 22 | — | — | — | — | — |
| 1996–97 | Lada–2 Togliatti | RUS.3 | 2 | 0 | 0 | 0 | 2 | — | — | — | — | — |
| 1997–98 | Lada Togliatti | RSL | 37 | 10 | 4 | 14 | 46 | — | — | — | — | — |
| 1997–98 | Lada–2 Togliatti | RUS.3 | 4 | 3 | 0 | 3 | 38 | — | — | — | — | — |
| 1997–98 | Traktor Chelyabinsk | RSL | 2 | 0 | 0 | 0 | 2 | — | — | — | — | — |
| 1998–99 | Québec Remparts | QMJHL | 21 | 9 | 22 | 31 | 38 | — | — | — | — | — |
| 1998–99 | Lada Togliatti | RSL | 15 | 2 | 2 | 4 | 10 | 4 | 0 | 1 | 1 | 8 |
| 1999–2000 | Mighty Ducks of Anaheim | NHL | 6 | 0 | 1 | 1 | 2 | — | — | — | — | — |
| 1999–2000 | Cincinnati Mighty Ducks | AHL | 40 | 9 | 12 | 21 | 82 | — | — | — | — | — |
| 2000–01 | Cincinnati Mighty Ducks | AHL | 65 | 6 | 9 | 15 | 45 | — | — | — | — | — |
| 2001–02 | Cincinnati Mighty Ducks | AHL | 23 | 6 | 4 | 10 | 33 | — | — | — | — | — |
| 2002–03 | Severstal Cherepovets | RSL | 12 | 1 | 2 | 3 | 31 | — | — | — | — | — |
| 2002–03 | Severstal–2 Cherepovets | RUS.3 | 15 | 6 | 18 | 24 | 96 | — | — | — | — | — |
| 2003–04 | Albany River Rats | AHL | 42 | 5 | 9 | 14 | 54 | — | — | — | — | — |
| 2004–05 | HC Lipetsk | RUS.2 | 41 | 8 | 7 | 15 | 121 | — | — | — | — | — |
| 2005–06 | HC Lipetsk | RUS.2 | 42 | 8 | 13 | 21 | 64 | 3 | 0 | 0 | 0 | 35 |
| 2006–07 | Dinamo Minsk | BLR | 21 | 6 | 11 | 17 | 36 | 12 | 6 | 7 | 13 | 12 |
| 2006–07 | Dinamo–2 Minsk | BLR.2 | 4 | 2 | 2 | 4 | 6 | — | — | — | — | — |
| 2006–07 | HC Lipetsk | RUS.3 | 2 | 2 | 5 | 7 | 6 | — | — | — | — | — |
| 2007–08 | Metallurg Novokuznetsk | RSL | 21 | 1 | 4 | 5 | 36 | — | — | — | — | — |
| 2007–08 | Dinamo Minsk | BLR | 7 | 2 | 4 | 6 | 30 | 4 | 2 | 1 | 3 | 29 |
| 2008–09 | Dinamo Minsk | KHL | 24 | 6 | 2 | 8 | 14 | — | — | — | — | — |
| 2008–09 | HK Gomel | BLR | 10 | 9 | 4 | 13 | 26 | — | — | — | — | — |
| 2009–10 | Dinamo Minsk | KHL | 5 | 0 | 1 | 1 | 0 | — | — | — | — | — |
| 2009–10 | Shakhtyor Soligorsk | BLR | 24 | 11 | 14 | 25 | 68 | 8 | 5 | 2 | 7 | 20 |
| 2010–11 | HK Gomel | BLR | 10 | 0 | 2 | 2 | 12 | — | — | — | — | — |
| 2010–11 | HK Brest | BLR | 31 | 9 | 18 | 27 | 98 | 4 | 3 | 2 | 5 | 8 |
| 2010–11 | HK–2 Gomel | BLR.2 | 3 | 2 | 3 | 5 | 0 | — | — | — | — | — |
| 2011–12 | HC Lipetsk | RUS.3 | 38 | 14 | 10 | 24 | 74 | 5 | 0 | 4 | 4 | 2 |
| 2012–13 | HC Lipetsk | RUS.3 | 38 | 19 | 11 | 30 | 60 | 7 | 2 | 2 | 4 | 16 |
| RSL totals | | | 105 | 20 | 13 | 33 | 147 | 4 | 0 | 1 | 1 | 8 |
| AHL totals | | | 170 | 26 | 34 | 60 | 214 | — | — | — | — | — |
| BLR totals | | | 103 | 37 | 53 | 90 | 270 | 28 | 16 | 12 | 28 | 69 |

=== International ===
Medal record

Representing Russia

Ice hockey

World Junior Championships
| Gold medal – first place | 1999 Canada | |
| Silver medal – second place | 1998 Finland | |

| Year | Team | Event | Result | GP | G | A | Pts | PIM |
|---|---|---|---|---|---|---|---|---|
| 1997 | Russia | EJC | 4th | 6 | 1 | 2 | 3 | 31 |
| 1998 | Russia | WJC | 2nd place, silver medalist(s) | 7 | 2 | 6 | 8 | 4 |
| 1999 | Russia | WJC | 1st place, gold medalist(s) | 7 | 3 | 5 | 8 | 4 |
| Junior totals | | | | 20 | 6 | 13 | 19 | 39 |
