= Kyle Quincey =

Canadian ice hockey player (born 1985)

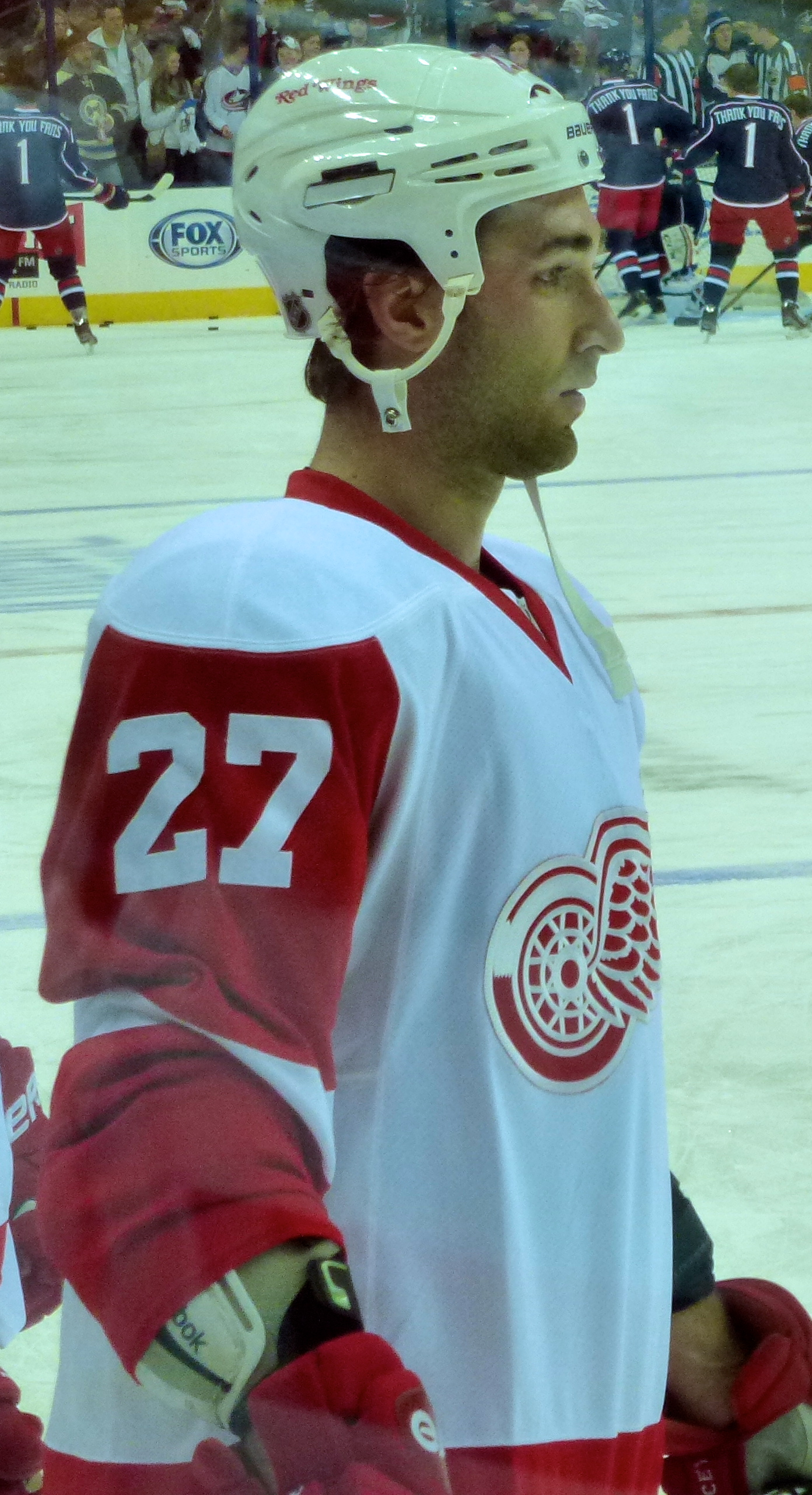
- Born: August 12, 1985 (age 41) Kitchener, Ontario, Canada
- Height: 6 ft 2 in (188 cm)
- Weight: 216 lb (98 kg; 15 st 6 lb)
- Position: Defence
- Shot: Left
- Played for: Detroit Red Wings; Los Angeles Kings; Colorado Avalanche; New Jersey Devils; Columbus Blue Jackets; Minnesota Wild; HIFK
- NHL draft: 132nd overall, 2003; Detroit Red Wings
- Playing career: 2005–2019

Kyle Quincey (born August 12, 1985) is a Canadian former professional ice hockey defenceman. Quincey played in the National Hockey League (NHL) for the Detroit Red Wings, Los Angeles Kings, Colorado Avalanche, Tampa Bay Lightning, New Jersey Devils, Columbus Blue Jackets, and the Minnesota Wild.

== Playing career ==
=== Junior ===
Quincey grew up in the Caledon, Ontario, area playing most of his minor hockey for the Halton Hurricanes AAA program of the OMHA. He was drafted in the third round, 47th overall, of the 2001 OHL Priority Selection by the London Knights.

Quincey was drafted 132nd overall by the Detroit Red Wings in the 2003 NHL entry draft after finishing his first Major junior hockey season with the Knights in 2002–03. At the beginning of the 2003–04 season in early October, Quincey was traded from London to the Mississauga IceDogs in a blockbuster deal for star forward Rob Schremp. Quincey helped the IceDogs to the OHL Final in 2004 before the IceDogs were swept in four games by the Guelph Storm.

Developing as an offensively-able defensive-defenceman, Quincey was named in the OHL Second All-Star Team in the 2004–05 season after finishing with 46 points in 59 games. Selected as the Eastern Conference's Best Defensive Defenceman, he also placed third in voting for the OHL's top defenceman award, the Max Kaminsky Trophy.

=== Professional ===
==== Detroit Red Wings ====
On July 28, 2005, Quincey was signed by the Detroit Red Wings to a three-year, entry-level contract. He was assigned to the Wings' American Hockey League (AHL) affiliate, the Grand Rapids Griffins, to begin his first professional season in 2005–06. He finished the season fifth among rookie defencemen in the AHL with seven goals and 33 points in 70 games, while also making his NHL debut with Detroit against the Mighty Ducks of Anaheim on November 25, 2005.

Quincey was again assigned to the Griffins the following season. As a late call-up, he scored his first NHL goal in the last game of the Red Wings' 2006–07 regular season in a 7–2 win over the Chicago Blackhawks on April 7, 2007. He scored in the second period against Patrick Lalime, which turned out to be the final Red Wing goal of the regular season. After injuries to defencemen Niklas Kronwall and Mathieu Schneider, Quincey was thrust into play just as the playoffs had begun. He first played in game six, an overtime victory for Detroit against the Calgary Flames that enabled the Wings to move on to the second round to play the San Jose Sharks. After dispatching San Jose, the Red Wings eventually lost to the Anaheim Ducks in six games in the Western Conference Final.

Slated to make the Detroit roster after an impressive 13-game playoff performance, Kyle suffered a setback after suffering a broken hand in training camp, forcing him to miss the entire 2007–08 pre-season. Quincey returned and played the majority of the year with Grand Rapids, scoring 20 points in 66 games. He was used as a call-up from the Griffins in February to play six games for Detroit in the regular season. During the 2008 playoffs, he was on the practice roster for the team as the Red Wings eventually captured the Stanley Cup over the Pittsburgh Penguins. Although the Red Wings included him on the Stanley Cup-winning picture, and was awarded a Stanley Cup ring. He however, did not qualify to be inscribed on the Stanley Cup.

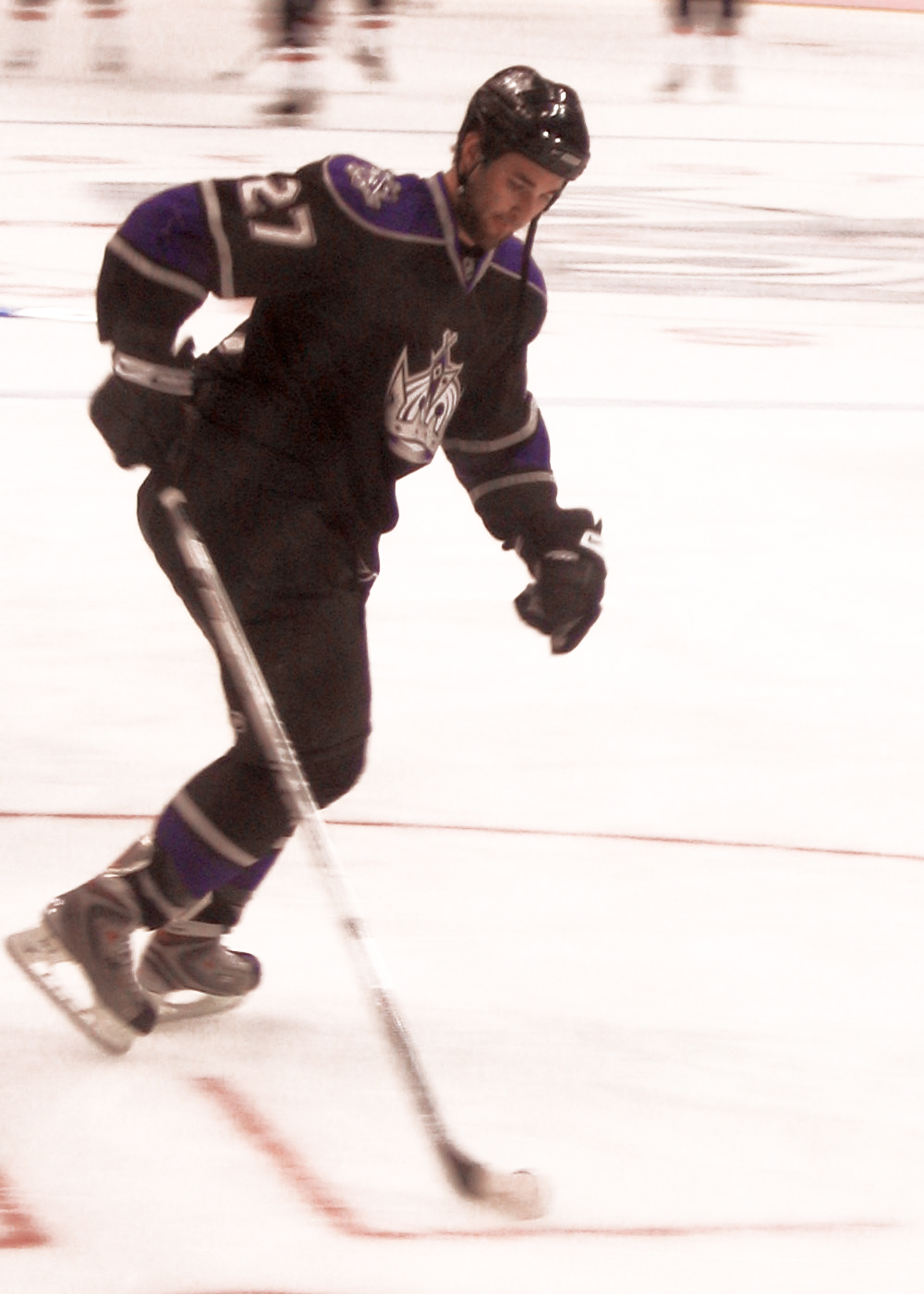
Quincey during his tenure with the Kings

Entering the 2008–09 season, Quincey was re-signed to a two-year contract on September 9, 2008.

==== Los Angeles Kings ====
Unable to crack the talent-laden Red Wings and due to salary cap compliance issues, he was placed and eventually claimed off waivers on October 13, 2008, by the Los Angeles Kings. Posting an assist in his Kings' debut against the Carolina Hurricanes on October 17, 2008, he quickly became an important part of a young Kings defensive corps, especially early in the season due to the injury of Jack Johnson, playing on the power play and penalty-killing units. He finished his breakthrough season leading the Kings' defence in scoring, with 34 assists and 38 points in 72 games, before finally succumbing to a herniated disc on April 1, 2009.

==== Colorado Avalanche ====
On July 3, 2009, Quincey was traded, along with defenceman Tom Preissing and a fifth-round pick in 2010, to the Colorado Avalanche in exchange for left winger Ryan Smyth. In the 2009–10 season, he made his Avalanche debut on opening night in a 5–2 victory over the San Jose Sharks on October 1, 2009. Quincey joined Todd Gill to become just the second player to play on the Avalanche after previously appearing for the rival Detroit Red Wings. Quincey again quickly established himself within the re-building Avalanche defence to lead the team in average ice time and to record a career-high of six goals for 29 points in 79 games. On July 2, 2010, he was signed by the Avalanche to a two-year contract extension.

In July and August 2011, Quincey captained Canada in a three-game exhibition series against the United States in New Zealand.

==== Return to Detroit ====
On February 21, 2012, in the last year of his contract with the Avalanche, Quincey was traded by Colorado to the Tampa Bay Lightning for Steve Downie. Just moments later, Tampa Bay traded him to the Detroit Red Wings for a first-round draft pick in 2012 and prospect Sébastien Piché. Marking his progression in returning to his original draft team in which his initially left on a waiver transaction, Quincey appeared in all 18 games and the Red Wings' first round defeat to the Nashville Predators to end the 2011–12 season.

As a restricted free agent on July 18, 2012, Quincey re-signed with the Red Wings on a two-year contract. With the NHL lock-out cancelling the start of the 2012–13 season, Quincey, who still resided in Denver, Colorado, from his tenure with the Avalanche, signed with the inaugural Denver Cutthroats of the Central Hockey League under the influence of former Kings teammate and current Cutthroats head coach, Derek Armstrong on October 12, 2012. With the intention to give back to the community, Quincey posted 11 points in 12 games with the Cutthroats before ending his tenure with the team on November 19, 2012. Quincey returned to Detroit when the NHL lock-out ended in January 2013.

During the 2013–14 season, Quincey was one of two Red Wings to play in all 82 games, recording four goals and nine assists along the way. On July 2, 2014, the Detroit Red Wings signed Quincey to a two-year, $8.5 million contract extension.

During the 2014–15 season, Quincey recorded three goals and 15 assists in 73 games, and finished with a career-best plus 10 rating. It was announced that Quincey would undergo offseason surgery to remove bone chips from his ankle. In the final year of his contract with Red Wings in the 2015–16 season, Quincey recorded four goals and seven assists in 47 games.

==== New Jersey Devils and Columbus Blue Jackets ====
On September 28, 2016, Quincey signed a one-year contract with the New Jersey Devils, In the 2016–17 season, Quincey secured a regular blueline role within the Devils top four defenceman. With the Devils falling in standings and having contributed 12 points in 53 games, Quincey was traded at the deadline to the playoff-bound Columbus Blue Jackets in exchange for Dalton Prout on March 1, 2017. He appeared in 20 games for the club, recording 3 points.

==== Minnesota Wild ====
On July 1, 2017, having left the Blue Jackets as a free agent, Quincey was signed to a one-year, $1.25 million contract to provide a veteran presence on the blueline with the Minnesota Wild. Quincey began the 2017–18 season, as a third-pairing defenseman for the Wild. After struggling in 18 games, Quincey was placed on waivers by Minnesota on November 29, 2017. Upon clearing waivers, Quincey was originally assigned to the AHL with the Iowa Wild, however refused to report, he subsequently sat out for the remainder of the season.

==== HIFK ====
On August 28, 2018, Quincey as a free agent signed his first contract abroad in agreeing to a one-year deal with Finnish club, HIFK of the Liiga.

== Personal ==
Quincey hails from Orangeville, Ontario, and cites former Toronto Maple Leafs forward Bill Berg as one of his childhood idols. "When I was young, my dad took me to see a Kings game in Toronto. I was watching Wayne Gretzky, but my dad said to me, ‘watch the way Bill Berg plays. Look at him working in the corners, not being afraid to get his nose dirty, and doing all of the little things.’ Berg became one of my favorite players to watch after that because of the effort he put, and how he never took a night off. I feel like I have taken a similar approach to working hard and being confident to do whatever is asked of me."

Kyle celebrated his day with the Stanley Cup from the Detroit Red Wings in Caledon, Ontario, with family and friends. He also took the Cup to Alder Street Recreation Centre for autographs and pictures with local fans. Kyle is married to longtime girlfriend Rachel Quincey (Hall). The couple wed on 5 February 2016 before the Hon. Stephen J. Murphy, III, United States District Judge.

== Career statistics ==
=== Regular season and playoffs ===
			Regular season					Playoffs
Season	Team	League	GP	G	A	Pts	PIM	GP	G	A	Pts	PIM
2001–02	Mississauga Chargers	OPJHL	27	5	14	19	31	—	—	—	—	—
2002–03	London Knights	OHL	66	6	12	18	77	14	3	4	7	11
2003–04	London Knights	OHL	3	0	2	2	4	—	—	—	—	—
2003–04	Mississauga IceDogs	OHL	61	14	23	37	135	24	3	13	16	32
2004–05	Mississauga IceDogs	OHL	59	15	31	46	111	5	0	3	3	4
2005–06	Detroit Red Wings	NHL	1	0	0	0	0	—	—	—	—	—
2005–06	Grand Rapids Griffins	AHL	70	7	26	33	107	16	0	1	1	27
2006–07	Detroit Red Wings	NHL	6	1	0	1	0	13	0	0	0	2
2006–07	Grand Rapids Griffins	AHL	65	4	18	22	126	2	0	0	0	0
2007–08	Detroit Red Wings	NHL	6	0	0	0	4	—	—	—	—	—
2007–08	Grand Rapids Griffins	AHL	66	5	15	20	149	—	—	—	—	—
2008–09	Los Angeles Kings	NHL	72	4	34	38	63	—	—	—	—	—
2009–10	Colorado Avalanche	NHL	79	6	23	29	76	6	0	0	0	8
2010–11	Colorado Avalanche	NHL	21	0	1	1	18	—	—	—	—	—
2011–12	Colorado Avalanche	NHL	54	5	18	23	60	—	—	—	—	—
2011–12	Detroit Red Wings	NHL	18	2	1	3	29	5	0	2	2	6
2012–13	Denver Cutthroats	CHL	12	2	9	11	6	—	—	—	—	—
2012–13	Detroit Red Wings	NHL	36	1	2	3	18	14	0	2	2	12
2013–14	Detroit Red Wings	NHL	82	4	9	13	88	5	0	0	0	2
2014–15	Detroit Red Wings	NHL	73	3	15	18	77	7	0	3	3	4
2015–16	Detroit Red Wings	NHL	47	4	7	11	36	4	0	1	1	4
2016–17	New Jersey Devils	NHL	53	4	8	12	39	—	—	—	—	—
2016–17	Columbus Blue Jackets	NHL	20	2	1	3	12	2	0	1	1	2
2017–18	Minnesota Wild	NHL	18	0	3	3	28	—	—	—	—	—
2018–19	HIFK	Liiga	35	5	8	13	58	12	1	6	7	12
AHL totals			201	16	59	75	382	18	0	1	1	27
NHL totals			586	36	122	158	548	56	0	9	9	40

=== International ===
Year	Team	Event	Reaults	GP	G	A	Pts	PIM
2002	Canada Ontario	U17	3rd place, bronze medalist(s)	5	0	1	1	6
2012	Canada	WC	5th	6	0	0	0	4

== Awards and honours ==
Award	Year
OHL
All-Star Game	2004, 2005
Second Team All-Star	2005
