= Eero Somervuori =

Finnish professional ice hockey forward (born 1979)

- Born: February 7, 1979 (age 47) Järvenpää, Finland
- Height: 5 ft 9 in (175 cm)
- Weight: 185 lb (84 kg; 13 st 3 lb)
- Position: Forward
- Shot: Right
- Played for: Jokerit; HPK; Hamilton Bulldogs; Kärpät; HC Ambrì-Piotta; Färjestad BK; Brynäs IF; HIFK; Blues; Lukko
- NHL draft: 170th overall, 1997; Tampa Bay Lightning
- Playing career: 1995–2018

Eero Somervuori (born February 7, 1979) is a Finnish former professional ice hockey forward. He was drafted 170th overall in the 1997 NHL entry draft by the Tampa Bay Lightning, but played mainly in the Finnish Liiga and Swedish Elitserien.

Somervuori won the Finnish Championship twice, in 1996/97 with Jokerit and 2004/05 with Kärpät, and the Swedish championship once, in 2008/09 with Färjestad BK. He played 729 games in the Liiga, also appearing for HPK of Hämeenlinna, Helsinki IFK, Espoo Blues and Rauman Lukko.

== Career statistics ==
=== Regular season and playoffs ===
| | | | Regular season | | | | | Playoffs |
| Season | Team | League | GP | G | A | Pts | PIM | GP | G | A | Pts | PIM |
|---|---|---|---|---|---|---|---|---|---|---|---|---|
| 1994–95 | Jokerit | FIN U18 | 15 | 8 | 10 | 18 | 4 | — | — | — | — | — |
| 1994–95 | Jokerit | FIN U20 | 10 | 1 | 1 | 2 | 2 | — | — | — | — | — |
| 1995–96 | Jokerit | FIN U18 | 13 | 10 | 13 | 23 | 6 | — | — | — | — | — |
| 1995–96 | Jokerit | FIN U20 | 28 | 14 | 12 | 26 | 10 | 9 | 4 | 1 | 5 | 4 |
| 1995–96 | Jokerit | SM-l | 6 | 1 | 2 | 3 | 0 | — | — | — | — | — |
| 1996–97 | Jokerit | FIN U18 | 1 | 0 | 0 | 0 | 2 | 5 | 3 | 0 | 3 | 4 |
| 1996–97 | Jokerit | FIN U20 | 28 | 20 | 19 | 39 | 30 | — | — | — | — | — |
| 1996–97 | Jokerit | SM-l | 35 | 1 | 1 | 2 | 2 | 5 | 0 | 0 | 0 | 0 |
| 1997–98 | Jokerit | FIN U20 | 14 | 4 | 8 | 12 | 2 | — | — | — | — | — |
| 1997–98 | Jokerit | SM-l | 42 | 3 | 7 | 10 | 12 | 8 | 2 | 1 | 3 | 6 |
| 1998–99 | Jokerit | FIN U20 | 4 | 1 | 1 | 2 | 2 | 4 | 3 | 0 | 3 | 2 |
| 1998–99 | Jokerit | SM-l | 50 | 7 | 8 | 15 | 24 | 3 | 1 | 0 | 1 | 6 |
| 1999–2000 | Jokerit | SM-l | 54 | 6 | 6 | 12 | 10 | 11 | 1 | 0 | 1 | 0 |
| 2000–01 | HPK | SM-l | 56 | 14 | 6 | 20 | 35 | — | — | — | — | — |
| 2001–02 | HPK | SM-l | 56 | 25 | 23 | 48 | 34 | 8 | 2 | 2 | 4 | 6 |
| 2002–03 | HPK | SM-l | 56 | 21 | 24 | 45 | 42 | 13 | 2 | 3 | 5 | 0 |
| 2003–04 | Hamilton Bulldogs | AHL | 79 | 19 | 14 | 33 | 14 | 10 | 2 | 3 | 5 | 0 |
| 2004–05 | Kärpät | SM-l | 56 | 16 | 26 | 42 | 14 | 12 | 2 | 1 | 3 | 4 |
| 2006–07 | HC Ambrì–Piotta | NLA | 44 | 16 | 21 | 37 | 16 | — | — | — | — | — |
| 2006–07 | EHC Biel–Bienne | SUI.2 | — | — | — | — | — | 2 | 1 | 1 | 2 | 0 |
| 2007–08 | Färjestad BK | SEL | 54 | 10 | 16 | 26 | 24 | 12 | 4 | 3 | 7 | 6 |
| 2008–09 | Färjestad BK | SEL | 55 | 15 | 21 | 36 | 16 | 13 | 5 | 1 | 6 | 4 |
| 2009–10 | Brynäs IF | SEL | 55 | 19 | 25 | 44 | 18 | 5 | 0 | 0 | 0 | 0 |
| 2010–11 | Brynäs IF | SEL | 55 | 17 | 17 | 34 | 24 | 5 | 1 | 3 | 4 | 2 |
| 2011–12 | HIFK | SM-l | 59 | 23 | 18 | 41 | 14 | 4 | 1 | 0 | 1 | 0 |
| 2012–13 | HIFK | SM-l | 45 | 13 | 14 | 27 | 14 | 7 | 1 | 2 | 3 | 2 |
| 2013–14 | HIFK | Liiga | 51 | 7 | 10 | 17 | 12 | — | — | — | — | — |
| 2014–15 | HPK | Liiga | 60 | 14 | 21 | 35 | 55 | — | — | — | — | — |
| 2015–16 | Blues | Liiga | 24 | 2 | 4 | 6 | 4 | — | — | — | — | — |
| 2015–16 | HPK | Liiga | 24 | 4 | 9 | 13 | 2 | — | — | — | — | — |
| 2016–17 | HPK | Liiga | 51 | 6 | 11 | 17 | 4 | 7 | 4 | 1 | 5 | 0 |
| 2017–18 | Lukko | Liiga | 4 | 1 | 0 | 1 | 2 | — | — | — | — | — |
| SM-l/Liiga totals | | | 729 | 164 | 190 | 354 | 280 | 78 | 16 | 10 | 26 | 24 |
| SEL totals | | | 219 | 61 | 79 | 140 | 82 | 35 | 10 | 7 | 17 | 12 |

=== International ===
| Year | Team | Event | GP | G | A | Pts | PIM |
|---|---|---|---|---|---|---|---|
| 1996 | Finland | EJC | 5 | 2 | 3 | 5 | 6 |
| 1997 | Finland | WJC | 6 | 1 | 2 | 3 | 2 |
| 1997 | Finland | EJC | 6 | 3 | 4 | 7 | 2 |
| 1998 | Finland | WJC | 7 | 3 | 6 | 9 | 2 |
| 1999 | Finland | WJC | 6 | 4 | 4 | 8 | 2 |
| Junior totals | | | 30 | 13 | 19 | 32 | 14 |
