= Brad Smyth =

Canadian ice hockey player

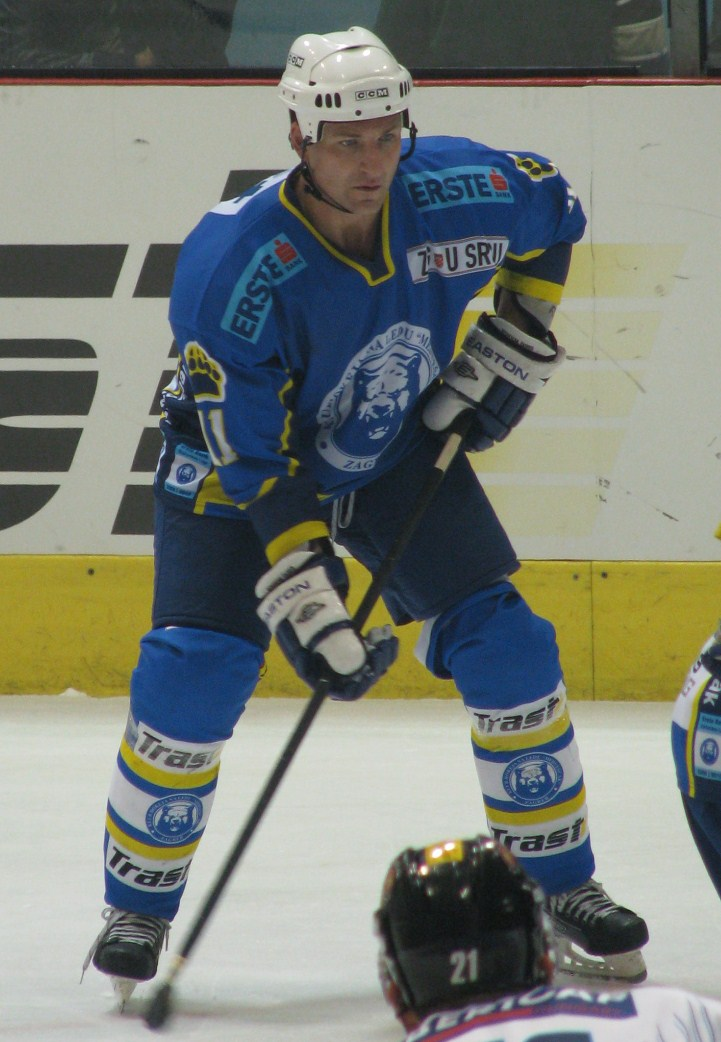
- Born: March 13, 1973 (age 52) Ottawa, Ontario, Canada
- Height: 6 ft 0 in (183 cm)
- Weight: 200 lb (91 kg; 14 st 4 lb)
- Position: Right wing
- Shot: Right
- Played for: Florida Panthers; Los Angeles Kings; New York Rangers; Nashville Predators; Ottawa Senators
- NHL draft: Undrafted
- Playing career: 1993–2013

Bradley Smyth (born March 13, 1973) is a Canadian former professional ice hockey player who endured a journeyman career and played in the National Hockey League with the Florida Panthers, Los Angeles Kings, New York Rangers, Nashville Predators and the Ottawa Senators.

== Playing career ==
Smyth played 88 games in the National Hockey League, playing for the Florida Panthers, Los Angeles Kings, New York Rangers, Nashville Predators and the Ottawa Senators. In his 88 regular season games, Smyth scored 15 goals and 13 assists for 28 points. He also collected 109 penalty minutes. After leaving the NHL in 2003, Smyth had spells in Finland's SM-liiga with Kärpät and in the American Hockey League with the Manchester Monarchs and the Hartford Wolf Pack before joining German team Hamburg Freezers of the DEL in 2006.

On April 10, 2009, Smyth left the DEL as a free agent and signed with EBEL team, KHL Medveščak Zagreb, from Croatia. In the 2009–10 season, Smyth contributed with 18 goals to finish third for Zagreb. In the playoffs, he helped the team to an upset victory over Graz 99ers before falling to eventual champions EC Red Bull Salzburg to post 4 points in 11 games.

Unsigned with the KHL the following season, Smyth joined teammate Richard Seeley and signed in the British Elite Ice Hockey League, with the Belfast Giants on October 6, 2010.

After six years abroad in Europe, on August 14, 2012, Smyth returned to North America and was signed by head coach and former teammate Derek Armstrong to a one-year contract with the newly established Denver Cutthroats of the Central Hockey League. Despite his age, Smyth showed no loss in ability with the Cutthroats, in forming the league's top scoring line alongside A.J. Gale and Troy Schwab, with 23 goals and 78 points in 65 games. After the Cutthroats first round loss to eventual champions, the Allen Americans, Smyth announced the end of his 20-year playing career. He did this by accepting an assistant coach and assistant director of hockey operations role within the Cutthroats on June 4, 2013. After a successful season behind the bench with the Cutthroats, he was promoted to director of hockey operations and head coach.

== Career statistics ==
=== Regular season and playoffs ===
			Regular season					Playoffs
Season	Team	League	GP	G	A	Pts	PIM	GP	G	A	Pts	PIM
1990–91	London Knights	OHL	29	2	6	8	22	—	—	—	—	—
1991–92	London Knights	OHL	58	17	18	35	93	10	2	0	2	8
1992–93	London Knights	OHL	66	54	55	109	118	12	7	8	15	25
1993–94	Birmingham Bulls	ECHL	29	26	30	56	38	10	8	8	16	19
1993–94	Cincinnati Cyclones	IHL	30	7	3	10	54	—	—	—	—	—
1994–95	Birmingham Bulls	ECHL	36	33	35	68	52	3	5	2	7	0
1994–95	Cincinnati Cyclones	IHL	26	2	11	13	34	1	0	0	0	2
1994–95	Springfield Falcons	AHL	3	0	0	0	7	—	—	—	—	—
1995–96	Carolina Monarchs	AHL	68	68	58	126	80	—	—	—	—	—
1995–96	Florida Panthers	NHL	7	1	1	2	4	—	—	—	—	—
1996–97	Phoenix Roadrunners	IHL	3	5	2	7	0	—	—	—	—	—
1996–97	Florida Panthers	NHL	8	1	0	1	2	—	—	—	—	—
1996–97	Los Angeles Kings	NHL	44	8	8	16	74	—	—	—	—	—
1997–98	Los Angeles Kings	NHL	9	1	3	4	4	—	—	—	—	—
1997–98	New York Rangers	NHL	1	0	0	0	0	—	—	—	—	—
1997–98	Hartford Wolf Pack	AHL	57	29	33	62	79	15	12	8	20	11
1998–99	Milwaukee Admirals	IHL	34	11	16	27	21	—	—	—	—	—
1998–99	Nashville Predators	NHL	3	0	0	0	6	—	—	—	—	—
1998–99	Hartford Wolf Pack	AHL	36	25	19	44	48	7	6	0	6	14
1999–00	Hartford Wolf Pack	AHL	80	39	37	76	62	23	13	10	23	8
2000–01	Hartford Wolf Pack	AHL	77	50	29	79	110	5	2	3	5	8
2000–01	New York Rangers	NHL	4	1	0	1	4	—	—	—	—	—
2001–02	Hartford Wolf Pack	AHL	79	34	48	82	90	10	3	8	11	14
2002–03	Binghamton Senators	AHL	69	24	32	56	77	14	7	6	13	12
2002–03	Ottawa Senators	NHL	12	3	1	4	15	—	—	—	—	—
2003–04	Kärpät	SM-l	48	20	18	38	85	15	3	5	8	4
2004–05	Manchester Monarchs	AHL	61	23	33	56	74	6	2	1	3	6
2005–06	Manchester Monarchs	AHL	64	27	37	64	49	—	—	—	—	—
2005–06	Hartford Wolf Pack	AHL	16	7	15	22	20	9	1	3	4	4
2006–07	Hamburg Freezers	DEL	52	23	36	59	58	4	1	1	2	4
2007–08	Hamburg Freezers	DEL	56	27	30	57	52	8	3	4	7	14
2008–09	Hamburg Freezers	DEL	25	6	9	15	22	9	1	1	2	6
2009–10	KHL Medveščak	EBEL	44	18	19	37	40	11	2	2	4	6
2010–11	Belfast Giants	EIHL	17	7	10	17	12	—	—	—	—	—
2010–11	Fassa	ITA	16	9	6	15	12	5	3	1	4	4
2011–12	Morzine-Avoriaz	FRA	26	8	17	25	38	5	1	3	4	6
2012–13	Denver Cutthroats	CHL	65	25	53	78	54	5	3	0	3	2
AHL totals			610	326	341	667	696	89	46	39	85	75
NHL totals			88	15	13	28	109	—	—	—	—	—

== Awards and honours ==
Award	Year
AHL
First All-Star Team	1995–96, 2000–01, 2001–02
John B. Sollenberger Trophy	1995–96
Willie Marshall Award	1995–96
Les Cunningham Award	1995–96
All-Star Game	2001
