= Pierre Hedin =

Swedish ice hockey player

- Born: 19 February 1978 (age 48) Örnsköldsvik, Sweden
- Height: 6 ft 2 in (188 cm)
- Weight: 200 lb (91 kg; 14 st 4 lb)
- Position: Defence
- Shot: Left
- Played for: Elitserien; Modo Hockey; Södertälje SK; Timrå IK; AHL; St. John's Maple Leafs; NHL; Toronto Maple Leafs; DEL; Adler Mannheim; NLA; HC Ambrì-Piotta
- NHL draft: 239th overall, 1999; Toronto Maple Leafs
- Playing career: 1996–2012

Pierre Nils Daniel Hedin (born 19 February 1978) is a Swedish retired professional ice hockey defenceman.

== Playing career ==
Hedin began his career with Modo Hockey and made his debut for the senior team during the 1996-97 Elitserien season. He was drafted 239th overall by the Toronto Maple Leafs in the 1999 NHL entry draft and played three games for the Leafs during the 2003-04 NHL season before returning to Modo Hockey.

Hedin also played in Germany for Adler Mannheim and in Switzerland for HC Ambrì-Piotta before returning to Modo for a third spell. He would finish his career in Sweden with Södertälje SK and Timrå IK.

He was also a member of the Sweden national team for the 2002 IIHF World Championship.

== Career statistics ==
=== Regular season and playoffs ===
			Regular season					Playoffs
Season	Team	League	GP	G	A	Pts	PIM	GP	G	A	Pts	PIM
1994–95	Modo Hockey	J20	21	0	3	3	20	—	—	—	—	—
1995–96	Modo Hockey	J20	29	6	8	14	34	—	—	—	—	—
1996–97	Modo Hockey	J20	20	6	11	17	—	—	—	—	—	—
1996–97	Modo Hockey	SEL	19	1	2	3	6	—	—	—	—	—
1997–98	Modo Hockey	J20	7	6	1	7	10	—	—	—	—	—
1997–98	Modo Hockey	SEL	29	2	1	3	26	9	1	1	2	4
1998–99	Modo Hockey	SEL	41	6	5	11	28	13	1	1	2	12
1999–00	Modo Hockey	SEL	48	9	5	14	36	13	0	2	2	8
2000–01	Modo Hockey	SEL	46	5	8	13	59	7	3	0	3	4
2001–02	Modo Hockey	SEL	39	7	9	16	20	14	8	2	10	10
2002–03	Modo Hockey	SEL	46	8	14	22	32	6	0	1	1	4
2003–04	St. John's Maple Leafs	AHL	62	5	19	24	52	—	—	—	—	—
2003–04	Toronto Maple Leafs	NHL	3	0	1	1	0	—	—	—	—	—
2004–05	Modo Hockey	SEL	31	3	4	7	28	6	1	0	1	6
2005–06	Adler Mannheim	DEL	50	8	13	21	52	—	—	—	—	—
2006–07	HC Ambrì-Piotta	NLA	20	2	5	7	26	—	—	—	—	—
2006–07	Modo Hockey	SEL	31	0	7	7	30	20	0	6	6	32
2007–08	Modo Hockey	SEL	55	6	9	15	72	4	0	1	1	8
2008–09	Modo Hockey	SEL	53	4	4	8	62	—	—	—	—	—
2009–10	Södertälje SK	SEL	48	7	13	20	48	—	—	—	—	—
2010–11	Södertälje SK	SEL	55	2	7	9	34	—	—	—	—	—
2011–12	Timrå IK	SEL	23	0	1	1	10	—	—	—	—	—
SEL totals			564	60	89	149	491	92	14	14	28	88
NHL totals			3	0	1	1	0	—	—	—	—	—

=== International ===
Year	Team	Event	GP	G	A	Pts	PIM
1996	Sweden	EJC	5	2	2	4	10
1998	Sweden	WJC	7	3	2	5	4
2002	Sweden	WC	9	2	1	3	4
Junior totals			12	5	4	9	14
