= Mika Noronen =

Finnish ice hockey player (born 1979)

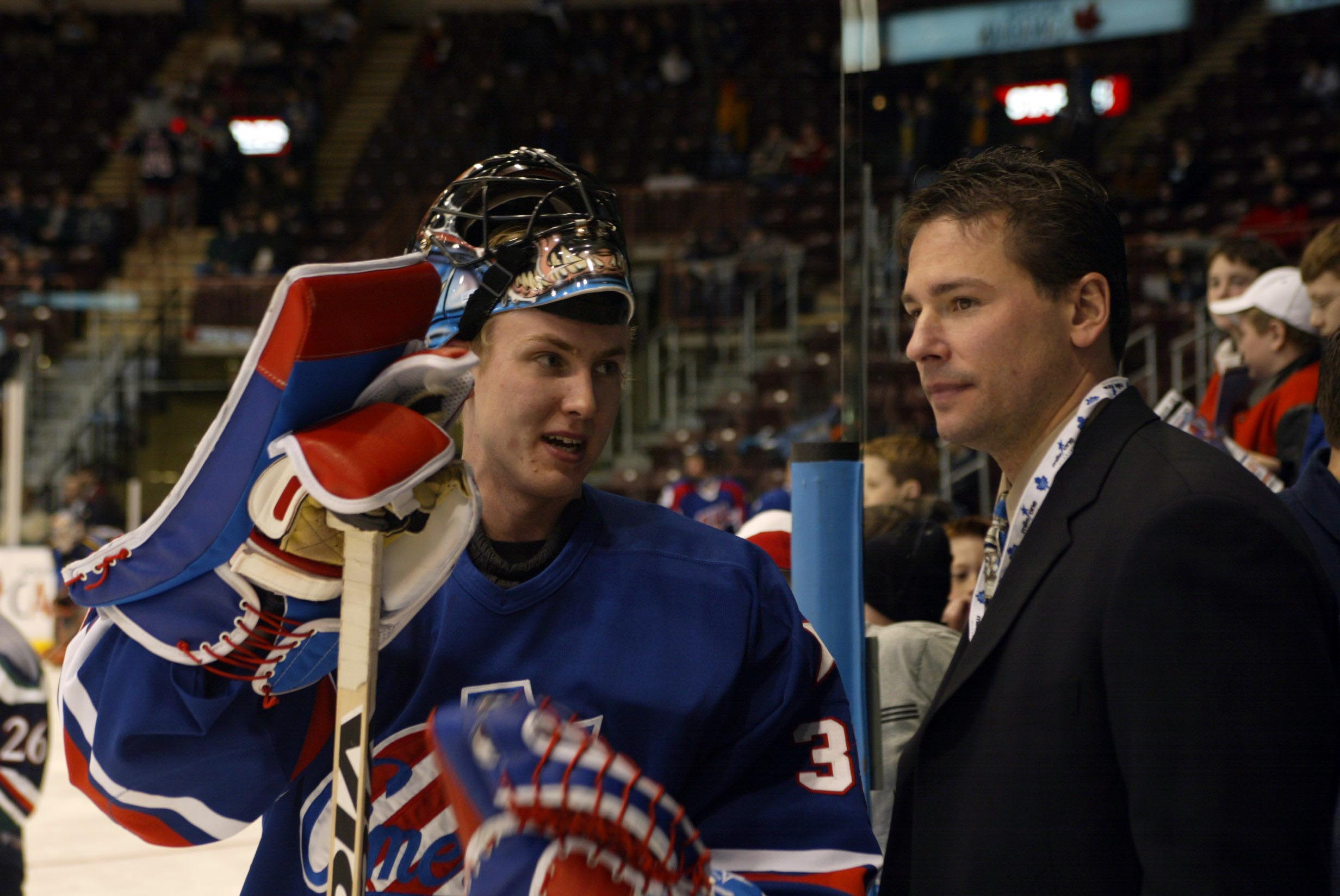
- Noronen with the Rochester Americans in 2002
- Born: 17 June 1979 (age 46) Tampere, Finland
- Height: 6 ft 1 in (185 cm)
- Weight: 201 lb (91 kg; 14 st 5 lb)
- Position: Goaltender
- Caught: Left
- Played for: Tappara; Buffalo Sabres; HPK; Vancouver Canucks; Ak Bars Kazan; Torpedo Nizhny Novgorod; Linköpings HC; JYP Jyväskylä; HIFK; Lukko; HC Davos; EHC München; Malmö Redhawks
- National team: Finland
- NHL draft: 21st overall, 1997; Buffalo Sabres
- Playing career: 2000–2016

Mika Noronen (born 17 June 1979) is a Finnish former professional ice hockey goaltender. He played 71 games in the National Hockey League (NHL) with the Buffalo Sabres and Vancouver Canucks between 2000 and 2006. The rest of his career, which lasted from 1997 to 2016, was mainly spent in Finland. Internationally Noronen played for the Finnish national team at the junior and senior level, including at the 2004 World Championships.

== Playing career ==
Noronen was drafted by the Buffalo Sabres in the 1997 NHL entry draft 21st overall. In his native Finland, he played for Tappara and HPK in the SM-liiga. He also played for the Rochester Americans in the American Hockey League.

While with the Rochester Americans, he gained some notoriety in a 2002 game against the Syracuse Crunch. A Crunch forward fired a slap shot past Noronen which hit the cross bar and bounced away. However, the goal judge signaled it was a goal. Play was stopped and the goal was counted. Noronen proceeded to spray the contents of his water bottle on the glass and wipe it away, pretending to clean the glass for the goal judge.

Noronen was the first Finnish goaltender to be credited with a goal in the National Hockey League, a rare feat in itself. He was also the first Buffalo Sabres goaltender to accomplish the feat when he was the last Buffalo player to touch the puck before it entered the opponent's empty net on a delayed penalty on February 14, 2004.

At the trade deadline in the 2005–06 season, Noronen was traded to the Vancouver Canucks in exchange for a second-round pick in the 2006 NHL entry draft. On March 14, 2006, Noronen played his first game as a Vancouver Canuck, allowing five goals in a 5–0 loss to the Nashville Predators.

In August 2006, Noronen opted to sign with Russian Hockey Super League team AK Bars Kazan rather than serving as back up to Roberto Luongo, making Noronen an unrestricted free agent at the end of the season. Then he joined Torpedo Nizhny Novgorod in the RSL. In January 2009 Noronen joined Linköpings HC of Elitserien. Noronen returned to Finland for the 2009–10 season. He began the season by signing a short-term contract with JYP Jyväskylä. After the contract had expired, he signed a contract with HIFK Helsinki. He retired after the 2016 season.

== Career statistics ==
=== Regular season and playoffs ===
			Regular season										Playoffs
Season	Team	League	GP	W	L	T	OTL	MIN	GA	SO	GAA	SV%	GP	W	L	MIN	GA	SO	GAA	SV%
1993–94	Tappara U16	FIN U16	—	—	—	—	—	—	—	—	—	—	—	—	—	—	—	—	—	—
1994–95	Tappara U18	FIN U18	—	—	—	—	—	—	—	—	—	—	—	—	—	—	—	—	—	—
1995–96	Tappara U18	FIN U18	5	—	—	—	—	299	13	—	2.61	—	5	—	—	300	8	—	1.60	—
1995–96	Tappara Jr	FIN Jr	16	—	—	—	—	962	37	2	2.31	—	—	—	—	—	—	—	—	—
1996–97	Tappara Jr	FIN Jr	17	—	—	—	—	—	—	—	—	—	13	—	—	—	—	—	1.99	.924
1996–97	Kokkolan Hermes	FIN-2	2	—	—	—	—	91	11	0	7.25	.868	—	—	—	—	—	—	—	—
1996–97	Tappara	FIN	5	1	3	0	—	215	17	0	4.73	.876	—	—	—	—	—	—	—	—
1997–98	Tappara Jr	FIN Jr	6	4	1	1	—	365	13	—	2.14	.933	4	2	2	262	11	0	2.52	.919
1997–98	Tappara	FIN	31	14	12	3	—	1703	83	1	2.92	.900	4	1	2	196	12	0	3.67	.878
1998–99	Tappara	FIN	43	18	20	5	—	2494	135	2	3.25	.893	—	—	—	—	—	—	—	—
1999–00	Rochester Americans	AHL	54	33	13	4	—	3089	112	6	2.18	.920	21	13	8	1235	37	6	1.80	.936
2000–01	Buffalo Sabres	NHL	2	2	0	0	—	109	5	0	2.77	.872	—	—	—	—	—	—	—	—
2000–01	Rochester Americans	AHL	47	26	15	5	—	2753	100	4	2.18	.913	4	1	3	250	11	0	2.64	.885
2001–02	Buffalo Sabres	NHL	10	4	3	1	—	518	23	0	2.66	.894	—	—	—	—	—	—	—	—
2001–02	Rochester Americans	AHL	45	16	17	12	—	2764	115	3	2.50	.906	1	0	1	59	3	0	3.06	.870
2002–03	Buffalo Sabres	NHL	16	4	9	3	—	892	36	1	2.42	.912	—	—	—	—	—	—	—	—
2002–03	Rochester Americans	AHL	19	5	9	5	—	1169	55	2	2.82	.903	—	—	—	—	—	—	—	—
2003–04	Buffalo Sabres	NHL	35	11	17	2	—	1797	77	2	2.57	.906	—	—	—	—	—	—	—	—
2004–05	HPK	FIN	27	14	8	4	—	1614	54	1	2.01	.927	9	4	4	482	21	1	2.61	.918
2005–06	Buffalo Sabres	NHL	4	1	2	—	0	169	12	0	4.27	.844	—	—	—	—	—	—	—	—
2005–06	Vancouver Canucks	NHL	4	1	1	—	0	171	10	0	3.52	.870	—	—	—	—	—	—	—	—
2005–06	Rochester Americans	AHL	2	0	2	—	0	121	6	0	2.99	.898	—	—	—	—	—	—	—	—
2006–07	Ak Bars Kazan	RSL	33	18	5	—	4	1877	66	2	2.11	.911	16	10	4	941	35	0	2.23	.886
2007–08	Ak Bars Kazan	RSL	15	9	4	—	0	906	37	0	2.45	.886	—	—	—	—	—	—	—	—
2008–09	Torpedo Nizhny Novgorod	KHL	14	2	9	—	2	713	34	1	2.86	.890	—	—	—	—	—	—	—	—
2008–09	Linköping HC	SWE	3	1	1	—	0	160	11	0	4.13	.895	3	1	2	221	8	1	2.17	.896
2009–10	JYP Jyväskylä	FIN	6	5	1	—	0	365	14	0	2.30	.898	—	—	—	—	—	—	—	—
2009–10	HIFK	FIN	25	17	8	—	0	1487	58	2	2.34	.918	6	2	4	372	15	1	2.42	.917
2010–11	Lukko	FIN	27	13	10	—	4	1598	55	5	2.06	.929	12	6	6	757	28	1	2.22	.915
2011–12	Lukko	FIN	50	17	22	—	8	2868	125	2	2.61	.914	1	0	1	58	5	0	5.19	.800
2012–13	Tappara	FIN	1	1	0	—	0	60	3	0	3.00	.919	1	0	0	1	0	0	0.00	1.000
2012–13	LeKi	FIN-2	2	—	—	—	—	124	2	1	0.97	.965	—	—	—	—	—	—	—	—
2013–14	HC Davos	NLA	15	7	8	—	0	891	42	1	2.83	.919	—	—	—	—	—	—	—	—
2013–14	EHC München	DEL	5	2	3	—	0	312	11	0	2.12	.946	3	1	2	179	10	0	3.35	.915
2014–15	LeKi	FIN-2	4	—	—	—	—	—	—	—	2.01	.937	5	—	—	—	—	—	1.67	.957
2014–15	Tappara	FIN	—	—	—	—	—	—	—	—	—	—	1	0	1	64	2	0	1.89	.895
2015–16	Tappara	FIN	3	1	0	—	2	189	5	0	1.59	.930	—	—	—	—	—	—	—	—
2015–16	Malmö Redhawks	SWE	1	0	1	—	0	40	4	0	6.00	.750	—	—	—	—	—	—	—	—
2015–16	LeKi	FIN-2	6	—	—	—	—	—	—	—	3.73	.887	—	—	—	—	—	—	—	—
NHL totals			71	23	32	6	0	3653	163	3	2.68	.901	—	—	—	—	—	—	—	—

=== International ===
Year	Team	Event	GP	W	L	T	MIN	GA	SO	GAA	SV%
1996	Finland	EJC	3	—	—	—	180	3	0	1.00	—
1997	Finland	EJC	5	—	—	—	300	8	0	1.60	—
1997	Finland	WJC	2	—	—	—	120	4	0	2.00	.945
1998	Finland	WJC	5	5	0	0	314	8	1	1.53	.934
1999	Finland	WJC	3	1	2	0	159	11	0	4.14	.831
2004	Finland	WC	5	2	2	1	309	12	1	2.33	.909
Junior totals			18	—	—	—	1073	34	1	1.90	—
Senior totals			5	2	2	1	309	12	1	2.33	.909

== Awards and honours ==
Award	Year
AHL
All-Rookie Team	2000
Second All-Star Team	2000, 2001
Dudley "Red" Garrett Memorial Award	2000
Hap Holmes Memorial Award (with Tom Askey)	2001
All-Star Game	2002

Awards and achievements
Preceded by Erik Rasmussen	Buffalo Sabres first-round draft pick 1997	Succeeded by Dmitri Kalinin
