= Tom Askey =

American ice hockey player (born 1974)

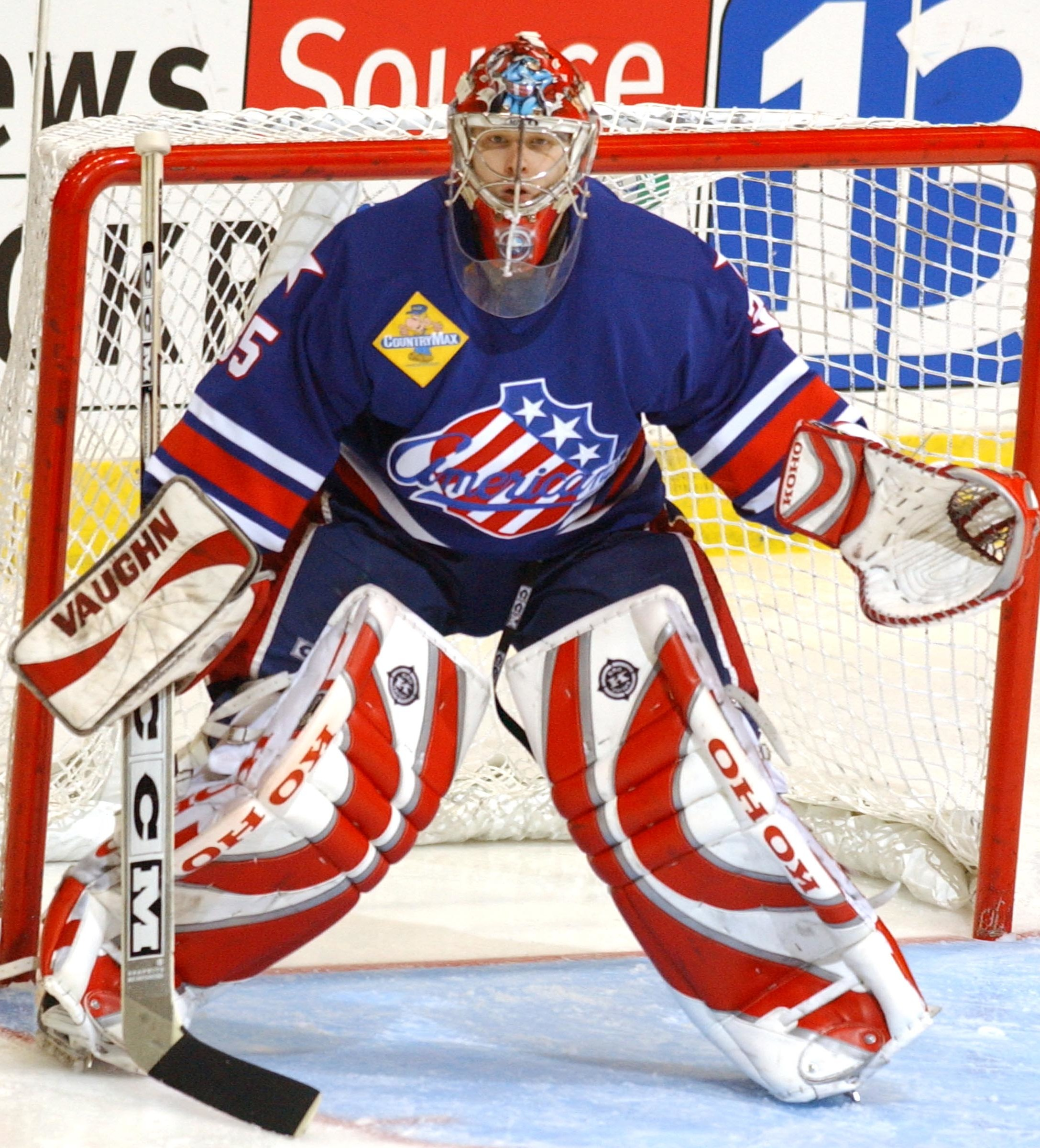
- Askey with the Rochester Americans in 2004
- Born: October 4, 1974 (age 51) Tonawanda, New York, U.S.
- Height: 6 ft 1 in (185 cm)
- Weight: 195 lb (88 kg; 13 st 13 lb)
- Position: Goaltender
- Caught: Left
- Played for: Mighty Ducks of Anaheim; HIFK; Jokerit; HC Fribourg-Gottéron; HC Alleghe; Nottingham Panthers
- National team: United States
- NHL draft: 186th overall, 1993; Mighty Ducks of Anaheim
- Playing career: 1996–2008

Thomas Arthur Askey (born October 4, 1974) is an American former professional ice hockey goaltender. He was drafted by the Mighty Ducks of Anaheim as their eighth-round pick, #186 overall, in the 1993 NHL entry draft.

== Playing career ==
Askey played hockey with Ohio State University of the CCHA. He finished his career in college with a record of 14–49–6. He joined the Mighty Ducks of Anaheim organization in 1996, playing for the team's AHL affiliate, the Baltimore Bandits alongside Mike Bales. Askey would help Baltimore make the Calder Cup playoffs, although the team would get swept in the first round by the Philadelphia Phantoms.

Before the 1997–98 season, the Baltimore Bandits would move to Cincinnati and become the Cincinnati Mighty Ducks. Askey moved with the team, playing in 32 games during the season. Askey was called up to the NHL in March as a backup goaltender following an injury to the Mighty Ducks' starter Guy Hebert. Askey made his NHL debut on March 13, 1998 in a game against the Dallas Stars, relieving Mikhail Shtalenkov in the third period in a 3–5 loss. Askey would later make his first start on April 5, 1998 against the Calgary Flames, which would end in a 3–3 tie. He finished the season playing a total of 7 games for the team, starting 3 of them and relieving Shtalenkov 4 times.

The following season he became the starter for the Cincinnati Mighty Ducks, playing in 53 games with a record of 21–22–3. He also saw NHL playoff action in Game 1 against the Detroit Red Wings, relieving an injured Guy Hebert halfway through the game, losing the game 3–5. The Red Wings would sweep the Mighty Ducks in the playoffs.

Before the 1999–2000 season, Askey was assigned to the Kansas City Blades of the International Hockey League. After 13 games with the team, he became a player for the Houston Aeros, playing 13 games for that team as well.

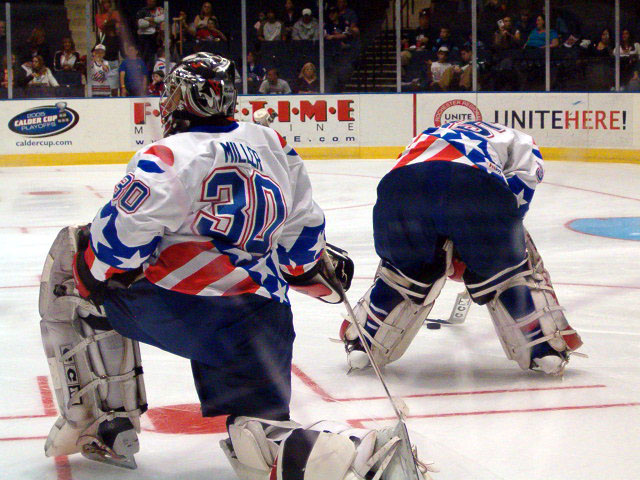
Ryan Miller (left) and Askey warming up for the Rochester Americans in 2005.

After becoming a free agent after the 1999–2000 season, he was signed by the Buffalo Sabres to be a goaltender for the Rochester Americans, the team's AHL affiliate. With his first season with the team, he finished the season with a record of 15–8–4. Although Rochester would miss the playoffs, Askey and teammate Mika Noronen would receive the Harry "Hap" Holmes Memorial Award, which is awarded to the goaltenders with the lowest goals-against average in the regular season.

In the 2001–02 season, Askey would help Rochester make the playoffs with a 16–15–3 record in the regular season. He made a single start in the playoffs where Rochester would be swept by the Philadelphia Phantoms in the qualifying round. The following season, Askey played 16 games, finishing the season with only 3 wins. In August 2003, Askey would sign a two-year extension to stay with Rochester. During the 2003–04 season, Askey would again help Rochester make the playoffs. He played 2 games in the playoffs. Rochester would make it to the Conference Finals in the playoffs before falling 4–1 to the Milwaukee Admirals, who would go on to win the Calder Cup.

He signed with HIFK in the Finnish SM-liiga for the 2005–06 season, and was traded to Jokerit in January 2006. After Jokerit failed to make the playoffs, Askey transferred to HC Fribourg-Gottéron in the Swiss Nationalliga A. In the late summer of 2006, Askey signed with the Kalamazoo Wings of the United Hockey League, returning to his hometown. He moved to the Serie A league in Italy for Hockey Club Alleghe before moving to the Nottingham Panthers in the Elite Ice Hockey League for the end of the 2007–08 season, helping them to win the Challenge Cup.

== Career statistics ==
=== Regular season and playoffs ===
			Regular season									Playoffs
Season	Team	League	GP	W	L	T	MIN	GA	SO	GAA	SV%	GP	W	L	MIN	GA	SO	GAA	SV%
1991–92	Wheatfield Jr. Blades	EmJHL	—	—	—	—	—	—	—	—	—	—	—	—	—	—	—	—	—
1992–93	Ohio State University	CCHA	25	2	19	0	1235	125	0	6.07	.841	—	—	—	—	—	—	—	—
1993–94	Ohio State University	CCHA	27	3	19	4	1488	103	0	4.15	.884	—	—	—	—	—	—	—	—
1994–95	Ohio State University	CCHA	26	4	19	2	1387	121	0	5.23	.861	—	—	—	—	—	—	—	—
1995–96	Ohio State University	CCHA	26	8	11	4	1340	68	0	3.05	.913	—	—	—	—	—	—	—	—
1996–97	Baltimore Bandits	AHL	40	17	18	2	2238	140	1	3.75	.887	3	0	3	137	11	0	4.79	.843
1997–98	Mighty Ducks of Anaheim	NHL	7	0	1	2	273	12	0	2.64	.894	—	—	—	—	—	—	—	—
1997–98	Cincinnati Mighty Ducks	AHL	32	10	16	4	1753	104	3	3.56	.896	—	—	—	—	—	—	—	—
1998–99	Cincinnati Mighty Ducks	AHL	53	21	22	3	2893	131	3	2.72	.918	—	—	—	—	—	—	—	—
1998–99	Mighty Ducks of Anaheim	NHL	—	—	—	—	—	—	—	—	—	1	0	1	30	2	0	3.99	.818
1999–00	Kansas City Blades	IHL	13	3	5	3	658	43	0	3.92	.866	—	—	—	—	—	—	—	—
1999–00	Houston Aeros	IHL	13	4	7	1	727	33	0	2.72	.892	—	—	—	—	—	—	—	—
2000–01	Rochester Americans	AHL	29	15	8	4	1671	71	1	2.55	.905	—	—	—	—	—	—	—	—
2001–02	Rochester Americans	AHL	34	16	15	3	2048	86	3	2.52	.901	1	0	1	58	4	0	4.11	.833
2002–03	Rochester Americans	AHL	16	3	8	4	895	49	0	3.28	.891	—	—	—	—	—	—	—	—
2003–04	Rochester Americans	AHL	21	10	8	3	1273	48	1	2.26	.919	2	2	0	120	5	1	2.50	.912
2004–05	Rochester Americans	AHL	20	10	6	2	1118	46	1	2.47	.918	—	—	—	—	—	—	—	—
2005–06	HIFK	FIN	21	9	5	5	1191	49	2	2.47	—	—	—	—	—	—	—	—	—
2005–06	Jokerit	FIN	16	8	6	2	967	39	2	2.42	—	—	—	—	—	—	—	—	—
2005–06	Fribourg-Gottéron	SWI	6	4	2	—	359	18	0	3.01	—	4	0	4	240	15	0	3.75	—
2006–07	Kalamazoo Wings	UHL	45	27	15	2	2572	110	3	2.57	.912	3	0	1	105	7	0	4.03	.863
2007–08	Alleghe	ITA	11	—	—	—	—	—	—	3.09	.879	—	—	—	—	—	—	—	—
2007–08	Nottingham Panthers	EIHL	29	—	—	—	—	—	—	2.13	.922	2	—	—	—	—	—	3.50	.887
NHL totals			7	0	1	2	273	12	0	2.64	.894	1	0	1	30	2	0	3.99	.818

=== International ===
Year	Team	Event	GP	W	L	T	MIN	GA	SO	GAA	SV%
1997	United States	WC	1	1	0	0	60	4	0	4.00	—
Senior totals			1	1	0	0	60	4	0	4.00	—

== Awards ==
- Hap Holmes Memorial Award (with Mika Noronen) in 2001
