= 1998 World Junior Ice Hockey Championships =

1998 IIHF World U20 Championship

Tournament details
- Host country: Finland
- Venues: 2 (in 2 host cities)
- Dates: December 25, 1997 – January 3, 1998
- Teams: 10

Final positions
- Champions: Finland (2nd title)
- Runners-up: Russia
- Third place: Switzerland
- Fourth place: Czech Republic

Tournament statistics
- Games played: 34
- Goals scored: 219 (6.44 per game)
- Attendance: 139,680 (4,108 per game)
- Scoring leader: (United States) Jeff Farkas (10 points)

The 1998 World Junior Ice Hockey Championships (1998 WJHC) were held in Helsinki and Hämeenlinna, Finland. The championships began on December 25, 1997, and finished on January 3, 1998. Home team Finland was the winner, defeating Russia 2–1 in the gold medal game, thanks to the goaltending of Mika Noronen and the overtime heroics of Niklas Hagman. Switzerland defeated the Czech Republic 4–3 to capture the bronze medal, their first and only medal in the Ice Hockey World Junior Championship.

Canada had its five-year title streak broken with its worst placing to date (8th). Canada would miss out on gold seven years in a row before beginning their 2005–2009 streak of five straight championships. It was the only tournament from 1993 to 2012 in which Canada failed to medal.

This tournament attracted 139,680 fans to 34 games for an average of 4,108 per game. This set a record for the highest-attended World Junior tournament in Europe until the 2016 tournament, which was also held in Finland, attracted 215,225 spectators.

The playoff round was expanded to eight teams, with group leaders not getting a bye to the semifinals.

== Championship results ==
All times are local. (Eastern European Time – UTC+2)

=== Pool A ===
==== Group A ====
Team	Pld	W	L	D	GF	GA	GD	Pts
Finland	4	3	0	1	17	10	+7	7
Czech Republic	4	2	1	1	16	12	+4	5
Sweden	4	2	2	0	16	6	+10	4
Canada	4	2	2	0	9	7	+2	4
Germany	4	0	4	0	1	24	−23	0

Source: Hockey Canada

December 25, 1997; 18:30	Finland	3–2 (0–0, 1–1, 2–1)	Canada	Hartwall Arena, Helsinki; Attendance: 9,000 (approx.)

Game reference

Mika Noronen
Goalies
Mathieu Garon
Referee:
(Sweden) Ulf Radbjer
Linesmen:
(United States) Allen Stensland
(Sweden) Kent Thuden

	0–1	30:02 - Ward
Kauppinen (Vallin, Kalto) - 33:01	1–1
Somervuori (Jokinen) (PP) - 47:27	2–1
	2–2	51:39 - Dumont (Tkaczuk)
Hagman (Somervuori, Jokinen) - 56:20	3–2

10 min
Penalties
21 min
38
Shots
18

December 25, 1997; 15:00	Czech Republic	2–1	Sweden	Hämeenlinna

December 26, 1997; 18:30	Sweden	4–0 (2–0, 1–0, 1–0)	Canada	Hartwall Arena, Helsinki; Attendance: 2,523

Game reference

Johan Holmqvist
Goalies
Roberto Luongo
Referee:
(Finland) Rami Savolainen
Linesmen:
(United States) Allen Stensland
(United States) Dino Casgrande

Nilson (Forsander) (PP) - 6:56	1–0
Hedin - 17:32	2–0
D. Sedin (H. Sedin) - 22:55	3–0
Cannerheim (Nilson) - 46:45	4–0

14 min
Penalties
20 min

December 26, 1997; 18:30	Finland	5–0	Germany	Hämeenlinna

December 27, 1997; 15:00	Germany	1–9	Czech Republic	Hartwall Arena, Helsinki

December 28, 1997; 15:00	Canada	5–0 (2–0, 3–0, 0–0)	Czech Republic	Hartwall Arena, Helsinki; Attendance: 7,500 (approx.)

Game reference

Mathieu Garon
Goalies
Adam Svoboda, Vlastimil Lakosil (15:46 second)
Referee:
(United States) Scott Hansen
Linesmen:
(Germany) Alfred Hascher
(Sweden) Kent Thuden

Holden (Corso) - 10:10	1–0
Cooke (Sarich) (PP) - 11:10	2–0
Tanguay (McLean) - 26:45	3–0
McLean (Tanguay, Brewer) (SH) - 30:40	4–0
Holden (Corso) - 38:05	5–0

12 min
Penalties
14 min

December 28, 1997; 18:30	Sweden	3–4	Finland	Hartwall Arena, Helsinki

December 29, 1997; 18:30	Germany	0–8	Sweden	Hartwall Arena, Helsinki

December 30, 1997; 15:00	Canada	2–0 (0–0, 1–0, 1–0)	Germany	Hartwall Arena, Helsinki; Attendance: 8,933

Game reference
Mathieu Garon	Goalies	Björn Leonhardt	Referee: (Sweden) Ulf Radbjer; Linesmen: (United States) Dino Casagrande (Switzerland) Nadir Mandioni
Bradley (Cooke, Lecavalier) -28:05 / 1–0; Lecavalier (Bradley) - 54:59 / 2–0			Referee: (Sweden) Ulf Radbjer; Linesmen: (United States) Dino Casagrande (Switzerland) Nadir Mandioni
26	Shots	17	Referee: (Sweden) Ulf Radbjer; Linesmen: (United States) Dino Casagrande (Switzerland) Nadir Mandioni

December 30, 1997; 18:30	Czech Republic	5–5	Finland	Hartwall Arena, Helsinki

==== Group B ====
Team	Pld	W	L	D	GF	GA	GD	Pts
Russia	4	3	0	1	22	6	+16	7
Switzerland	4	2	1	1	14	8	+6	5
United States	4	2	2	0	17	12	+5	4
Kazakhstan	4	1	3	0	8	29	−21	2
Slovakia	4	1	3	0	9	15	−6	2

Source: Hockey Canada

December 25, 1997; 15:00	Russia	12–1	Kazakhstan	Hämeenlinna

December 25, 1997; 15:00	Slovakia	6–3	United States	Hartwall Arena, Helsinki

December 26, 1997; 15:00	Kazakhstan	2–8	United States	Hartwall Arena, Helsinki

December 26, 1997; 15:00	Slovakia	1–3	Switzerland	Hämeenlinna

December 27, 1997; 18:30	Switzerland	3–3	Russia	Hartwall Arena, Helsinki

December 28, 1997; 15:00	Kazakhstan	5–2	Slovakia	Hämeenlinna

December 28, 1997; 18:30	United States	2–3	Russia	Hämeenlinna

December 29, 1997; 18:30	Switzerland	7–0	Kazakhstan	Hämeenlinna

December 30, 1997; 15:00	Russia	4–0	Slovakia	Hämeenlinna

December 30, 1997; 18:30	United States	4–1	Switzerland	Hämeenlinna

==== Final round ====
Quarterfinals
B1	Russia	2
A4	Canada	1
A2	Czech Republic	4
B3	United States	1
A1	Finland	14
B4	Kazakhstan	1
B2	Switzerland	2
A3	Sweden	1

Semifinals
QF1	Russia	5
QF2	Czech Republic	1
QF3	Finland	2
QF4	Switzerland	1

Finals
SF1	Russia	1
SF2	Finland	2
Bronze medal game
SF1	Switzerland	4
SF2	Czech Republic	3

===== Quarterfinals =====
December 31, 1997; 15:00	Russia	2–1 (OT) (1–0, 0–0, 0–1, 1–0)	Canada	Hämeenlinna; Attendance: 2,877

Game reference

Denis Khlopotnov
Goalies
Mathieu Garon
Referee:
(Finland) Rami Savolainen
Linesmen:
(Finland) Riku Peltonen
(Sweden) Kent Thuden

Vlasenkov (Lyashenko) - 18:01	1-0
	1-1	42:31 - Tkaczuk (Willsie, Blanchard)
Afinogenov (Balmochnykh) - 69:21	2-1

21
Shots
18

December 31, 1997; 15:00	Finland	14–1 (6–1, 5–0, 3–0)	Kazakhstan	Hartwall Arena, Helsinki

December 31, 1997; 18:30	Switzerland	2 – 1 GWS (0–0, 0–0, 1–1, 0–0, 5–4)	Sweden	Hartwall Arena, Helsinki

December 31, 1997; 18:30	Czech Republic	4–1 (0–0, 3–0, 1–1)	United States	Hämeenlinna

===== Semifinals =====
January 1, 1998; 16:00	Russia	5–1 (0–0, 3–1, 2–0)	Czech Republic	Hartwall Arena, Helsinki

January 1, 1998; 20:00	Switzerland	1–2 (0–1, 0–0, 1–1)	Finland	Hartwall Arena, Helsinki

David Aebischer	Goalies	Mika Noronen

===== Placement games =====
January 2, 1998; 15:00	Canada	0–3 (0–1, 0–1, 0–1)	United States	Hämeenlinna

Game reference

Mathieu Garon
Goalies
Jean-Marc Pelletier
Referee:
(Czech Republic) Petr Bolina
Linesmen:
(Finland) Riku Peltonen
(Switzerland) Nadir Mandioni

0-1	5:59 - York (Mottau) (PP)
0-2	39:31 - Dusbabek (Mara)
0-3	59:25 - Farkas (EN)

12 min
Penalties
8 min
15
Shots
40

January 2, 1998; 18:30	Sweden	5–1 (1–0, 2–0, 2–1)	Kazakhstan	Hämeenlinna

===== 7th place game =====
January 3, 1998; 12:00	Canada	3–6 (0–2, 0–2, 3–2)	Kazakhstan	Hämeenlinna; Attendance: 169

Game reference

Mathieu Garon, Roberto Luongo (14:00 second)
Goalies
Roman Krivomazov
Referee:
(Czech Republic) Petr Bolina
Linesmen:
(Russia) Vyacheslav Bulanov
Dariusz Sudol

	0-1	3:45 - Troshchinsky (Antropov)
	0-2	13:14 - Alexandrov (Troshchinsky, Antropov) (PP)
	0-3	31:47 - Troshchinsky (Alexandrov, Novopashin) (SH)
	0-4	34:00 - Troshchinsky (Antropov)
Holden (Blanchard) (PP) - 47:25	1-4
Holden (Ference, Corso) (PP) - 50:10	2-4
	2-5	58:21 - Komissarov (Ksandopulo)
	2-6	59:20 - Rifel (EN)
Tkaczuk (Willsie, Brewer) - 59:57	3-6

19 min
Penalties
20 min
43
Shots
17

===== 5th place game =====
January 3, 1998; 16:00	United States	4–3 (1–2, 2–0, 1–1)	Sweden	Hämeenlinna

===== Bronze medal game =====
January 3, 1998; 15:00	(bronze) Switzerland	4 – 3 GWS (2–0, 0–2, 1–1, 0–0, 2–0)	Czech Republic	Hartwall Arena, Helsinki

===== Gold medal game =====
January 3, 1998; 18:30	(gold) Finland	2–1 (OT) (0–0, 0–1, 1–0, 1–0)	Russia (silver)	Hartwall Arena, Helsinki; Attendance: 13,655

Mika Noronen
Goalies
Denis Khlopotnov

	0–1	37:10 − Vlassenkov
Puistola (PP) - 43:25	1–1
Hagman (Jokinen, Petriläinen) - 73:41	2–1

45
Shots
26

==== Relegation round ====
January 1, 1998	Germany	0–9 (0–1, 0–4, 0–4)	Slovakia	Hartwall Arena, Helsinki

January 3, 1998	Slovakia	8–3 (0–1, 3–2, 5–0)	Germany	Hartwall Arena, Helsinki

Germany lost the two game total goal series 17–3 and was relegated for the 1999 World Juniors

==== Final ranking ====
Rank	Country
1st place, gold medalist(s)	Finland
2nd place, silver medalist(s)	Russia
3rd place, bronze medalist(s)	Switzerland
4	Czech Republic
5	United States
6	Sweden
7	Kazakhstan
8	Canada
9	Slovakia
10	Germany

==== Scoring leaders ====
Player	Country	GP	G	A	Pts
Jeff Farkas	United States	7	6	4	10
Olli Jokinen	Finland	7	4	6	10
Eero Somervuori	Finland	7	3	6	9
Ladislav Nagy	Slovakia	6	6	2	8
Brian Gionta	United States	7	5	3	8
Marián Hossa	Slovakia	6	4	4	8
Timo Vertala	Finland	7	4	4	8
Andrej Podkonický	Slovakia	6	3	5	8
Marcus Nilson	Sweden	7	3	5	8
Maxim Balmochnykh	Russia	7	2	6	8
Kamil Piroš	Slovakia	7	2	6	8

==== Tournament awards ====
	IIHF Directorate Awards	Media All-Star Team
Goaltender	(Switzerland) David Aebischer	(Switzerland) David Aebischer
Defencemen	(Czech Republic) Pavel Skrbek	(Sweden) Pierre Hedin (Russia) Andrei Markov
Forwards	(Finland) Olli Jokinen	(Russia) Maxim Balmochnykh (Finland) Olli Jokinen (Finland) Eero Somervuori

=== Pool B ===
The second tier was held in Sosnowiec and Tychy Poland, from December 28 to January 4. Two groups of four played round robins, and then the top three played each of the top three teams from the other group. All scores carried forward except the results against the lone eliminated team from each group.

==== Preliminary round ====
Group A

Team	Pld	W	L	D	GF	GA	GD	Pts	Hungary men's national junior ice hockey team	Latvia men's national junior ice hockey team	France men's national junior ice hockey team	Japan men's national junior ice hockey team
Hungary	3	1	0	2	10	9	+1	4		3–2	2–2	5–5
Latvia	3	2	1	0	15	10	+5	4	2–3		5–2	8–5
France	3	1	1	1	12	9	+3	3	2–2	2–5		8–2
Japan	3	0	2	1	12	21	−9	1	5–5	5–8	2–8	

Group B

Team	Pld	W	L	D	GF	GA	GD	Pts	Poland men's national junior ice hockey team	Ukraine men's national junior ice hockey team	Belarus men's national junior ice hockey team	Norway men's national junior ice hockey team
Poland	3	2	1	0	13	11	+2	4		7–3	1–4	5–4
Ukraine	3	1	1	1	13	10	+3	3	3–7		2–2	8–1
Belarus	3	1	1	1	6	6	0	3	4–1	2–2		0–3
Norway	3	1	2	0	8	13	−5	2	4–5	1–8	3–0	

==== Final round ====
Pos	Team	Pld	W	L	D	GF	GA	GD	Pts	Belarus men's national junior ice hockey team	Ukraine men's national junior ice hockey team	Poland men's national junior ice hockey team	Latvia men's national junior ice hockey team	Hungary men's national junior ice hockey team	France men's national junior ice hockey team
1	Belarus	5	4	0	1	22	8	+14	9		2–2	4–1	3–1	8–0	5–4
2	Ukraine	5	3	1	1	23	12	+11	7	2–2		3–7	5–1	4–1	9–1
3	Poland	5	3	2	0	24	13	+11	6	1–4	7–3		2–3	8–0	6–3
4	Latvia	5	2	3	0	12	15	−3	4	1–3	1–5	3–2		2–3	5–2
5	Hungary	5	1	3	1	6	24	−18	3	0–8	1–4	0–8	3–2		2–2
6	France	5	0	4	1	12	27	−15	1	4–5	1–9	3–6	2–5	2–2	

Belarus was promoted to Pool A for 1999.

==== Relegation round ====
Norway	6–4	Japan

Norway	3 – 4 ot	Japan

Norway	4–1	Japan

Japan lost two games to one and was relegated to Pool C for 1999.

=== Pool C ===
Played in Tallinn and Kohtla-Järve Estonia from December 28 to January 1.

==== Preliminary round ====
Group A

Team	Pld	W	L	D	GF	GA	GD	Pts	Italy men's national junior ice hockey team	Austria men's national junior ice hockey team	Estonia men's national junior ice hockey team	Great Britain men's national junior ice hockey team
Italy	3	2	0	1	20	6	+14	5		4–4	11–1	5–1
Austria	3	2	0	1	18	6	+12	5	4–4		8–1	6–1
Estonia	3	1	2	0	5	20	−15	2	1–11	1–8		3–1
Great Britain	3	0	3	0	3	14	−11	0	1–5	1–6	1–3	

Group B

Team	Pld	W	L	D	GF	GA	GD	Pts	Denmark men's national junior ice hockey team	Slovenia men's national junior ice hockey team	Croatia men's national junior ice hockey team	Romania men's national junior ice hockey team
Denmark	3	3	0	0	26	8	+18	6		5–4	8–1	13–3
Slovenia	3	2	1	0	15	8	+7	4	4–5		4–1	7–2
Croatia	3	1	2	0	6	14	−8	2	1–8	1–4		4–2
Romania	3	0	3	0	7	24	−17	0	3–13	2–7	2–4	

==== Placement games ====
- 7th place:Great Britain 7 – 5 Romania
- 5th place:Croatia 3 – 2 Estonia
- 3rd place:Slovenia 4 – 2 Austria
- 1st Place:Denmark 6 – 4 Italy

Denmark was promoted to Pool B, and Romania was relegated to Pool D for 1999.

=== Pool D ===
Played in Kaunas and Elektrenai Lithuania from December 30 to January 3.

==== Preliminary round ====
Group A

Team	Pld	W	L	D	GF	GA	GD	Pts	Netherlands men's national junior ice hockey team	Spain men's national junior ice hockey team	Bulgaria men's national junior ice hockey team	Turkey men's national junior ice hockey team
Netherlands	3	3	0	0	58	4	+54	6		7–1	19–2	32–1
Spain	3	2	1	0	18	9	+9	4	1–7		6–2	11–0
Bulgaria	3	1	2	0	17	29	−12	2	2–19	2–6		13–4
Turkey	3	0	3	0	5	56	−51	0	1–32	0–11	4–13	

Group B

Team	Pld	W	L	D	GF	GA	GD	Pts	Lithuania men's national junior ice hockey team	Serbia and Montenegro men's national junior ice hockey team	Mexico men's national junior ice hockey team	South Africa men's national junior ice hockey team
Lithuania	3	3	0	0	33	2	+31	6		5–1	14–0	14–1
Yugoslavia	3	2	1	0	23	7	+16	4	1–5		13–0	9–2
Mexico	3	1	2	0	3	28	−25	2	0–14	0–13		3–1
South Africa	3	0	3	0	4	26	−22	0	1–14	2–9	1–3	

==== Placement games ====
- 7th place:South Africa 11 – 0 Turkey
- 5th place:Mexico 6 – 4 Bulgaria
- 3rd place:Yugoslavia 9 – 0 Spain
- 1st Place:Lithuania 6 – 3 Netherlands

Lithuania was promoted to Pool C for 1999.
