= 2000–01 AHL season =

- League: American Hockey League
- Sport: Ice hockey

Regular season
- Macgregor Kilpatrick Trophy: Worcester IceCats
- Season MVP: Derek Armstrong
- Top scorer: Derek Armstrong

Playoffs
- Playoffs MVP: Steve Begin

Calder Cup
- Champions: Saint John Flames
- Runners-up: Wilkes-Barre/Scranton Penguins

AHL seasons
- 1999–2000 2001–02

The 2000–01 AHL season was the 65th season of the American Hockey League. The league realigned its divisions again. The Atlantic division was renamed as the Canadian division. The Empire State division was replaced by the South division, with many teams shifting from the Mid-Atlantic division.

Twenty teams played 80 games each in the schedule. The Worcester IceCats finished first overall in the regular season. The Saint John Flames won their first Calder Cup championship.

== Team changes ==
- The Norfolk Admirals joined the AHL as an expansion team, based in Norfolk, Virginia, playing in the South division.
- The Lowell Lock Monsters switched divisions from Atlantic to New England.
- The Hamilton Bulldogs switched divisions from Empire State to Canadian.
- The Albany River Rats, Rochester Americans, Syracuse Crunch and Wilkes-Barre/Scranton Penguins switched from the Empire State division to the Mid-Atlantic division.
- The Cincinnati Mighty Ducks, Kentucky Thoroughblades and Louisville Panthers switched from the Mid-Atlantic division to the South division.

== Final standings ==
- y– indicates team clinched division and a playoff spot
- x– indicates team clinched a playoff spot
- e– indicates team was eliminated from playoff contention

=== Eastern Conference ===
Canadian Division	GP	W	L	T	OTL	Pts	GF	GA
y–Saint John Flames (CGY)	80	44	24	7	5	100	269	210
x–Quebec Citadelles (MTL)	80	41	32	3	4	89	264	252
x–St. John's Maple Leafs (TOR)	80	35	35	8	2	80	247	244
e–Hamilton Bulldogs (EDM)	80	28	41	6	5	67	227	281

New England Division	GP	W	L	T	OTL	Pts	GF	GA
y–Worcester IceCats (STL)	80	48	20	9	3	108	264	205
x–Hartford Wolf Pack (NYR)	80	40	26	8	6	94	263	247
x–Providence Bruins (BOS)	80	35	31	10	4	84	245	242
x–Lowell Lock Monsters (LAK/NYI)	80	35	35	5	5	80	225	244
x–Portland Pirates (WSH)	80	34	40	4	2	74	250	280
e–Springfield Falcons (NYI/PHX)	80	29	37	8	6	72	253	280

=== Western Conference ===
Mid-Atlantic Division	GP	W	L	T	OTL	Pts	GF	GA
y–Rochester Americans (BUF)	80	46	22	9	3	104	224	192
x–Wilkes-Barre/Scranton Penguins (PIT)	80	36	33	9	2	83	252	248
x–Syracuse Crunch (CBJ)	80	33	30	12	5	83	235	254
x–Philadelphia Phantoms (PHI)	80	36	34	5	5	82	246	244
x–Hershey Bears (COL)	80	34	39	4	3	75	216	234
e–Albany River Rats (NJD)	80	30	40	6	4	70	216	262

South Division	GP	W	L	T	OTL	Pts	GF	GA
y–Kentucky Thoroughblades (SJS)	80	42	25	12	1	97	273	212
x–Cincinnati Mighty Ducks (ANA/DET)	80	41	26	9	4	95	254	240
x–Norfolk Admirals (CHI)	80	36	26	13	5	90	241	208
e–Louisville Panthers (FLA)	80	21	51	5	3	50	200	285

== Scoring leaders ==
Note: GP = Games played; G = Goals; A = Assists; Pts = Points; PIM = Penalty minutes

Player	Team	GP	G	A	Pts	PIM
Derek Armstrong	Hartford Wolf Pack	75	32	69	101	73
Jean-Guy Trudel	Springfield Falcons	80	34	65	99	89
Ryan Kraft	Kentucky Thoroughblades	77	38	50	88	36
Mark Greig	Philadelphia Phantoms	74	31	57	88	98
Brad Smyth	Hartford Wolf Pack	77	50	29	79	110
Bill Bowler	Syracuse Crunch	72	21	58	79	50
Mikael Samuelsson	Kentucky Thoroughblades	66	32	46	78	58
Marty Murray	Saint John Flames	56	24	52	76	36
Jim Montgomery	Kentucky Thoroughblades	55	22	52	74	44
Steve Bancroft	Kentucky Thoroughblades	80	23	50	73	162

- complete list

== Calder Cup playoffs ==
Division Semifinals	Division Finals
C1	Saint John	3
N5	Portland	0
C1	Saint John	4
Canadian Division
C2	Quebec	1
C2	Quebec	3
C3	St. John's	1
Eastern Conference
N1	Worcester	3
N4	Lowell	1
N1	Worcester	3
New England Division
N3	Providence	4
N2	Hartford	2
N3	Providence	3
M1	Rochester	1
M4	Philadelphia	3
M2	Wilkes-Barre/Scranton	4
Mid-Atlantic Division
M4	Philadelphia	2
M2	Wilkes-Barre/Scranton	3
M3	Syracuse	2
Western Conference
S1	Kentucky	0
M5	Hershey	3
S3	Norfolk	1
Southern Division
M5	Hershey	4
S2	Cincinnati	1
S3	Norfolk	3

Conference Finals
C1	Saint John	4
N3	Providence	1
M2	Wilkes-Barre/Scranton	4
M5	Hershey	0

Calder Cup Final
C1	Saint John	4
M2	Wilkes-Barre/Scranton	2

== All Star Classic ==
The 14th AHL All-Star Game was played on January 15, 2001 at the First Union Arena at Casey Plaza in Wilkes-Barre, Pennsylvania. Team Canada defeated Team PlanetUSA 11–10. In the skills competition held the day before the All-Star Game, Team PlanetUSA won 16–8 over Team Canada.

== Trophy and award winners ==
=== Team awards ===
Calder Cup; Playoff champions:	Saint John Flames
Richard F. Canning Trophy; Eastern Conference playoff champions:	Saint John Flames
Robert W. Clarke Trophy; Western Conference playoff champions:	Wilkes-Barre/Scranton Penguins
Macgregor Kilpatrick Trophy; Regular season champions, League:	Worcester IceCats
Frank Mathers Trophy; Regular Season champions, Mid-Atlantic Division:	Rochester Americans
F. G. "Teddy" Oke Trophy; Regular Season champions, New England Division:	Worcester IceCats
Sam Pollock Trophy; Regular Season champions, Canadian Division:	Saint John Flames
John D. Chick Trophy; Regular Season champions, South Division:	Kentucky Thoroughblades

=== Individual awards ===
Les Cunningham Award; Most valuable player:	Derek Armstrong - Hartford Wolf Pack
John B. Sollenberger Trophy; Top point scorer:	Derek Armstrong - Hartford Wolf Pack
Dudley "Red" Garrett Memorial Award; Rookie of the year:	Ryan Kraft - Kentucky Thoroughblades
Eddie Shore Award; Defenceman of the year:	John Slaney - Wilkes-Barre/Scranton / Philadelphia
Aldege "Baz" Bastien Memorial Award; Best goaltender:	Dwayne Roloson - Worcester IceCats
Harry "Hap" Holmes Memorial Award; Lowest goals against average:	Mika Noronen & Tom Askey - Rochester Americans
Louis A.R. Pieri Memorial Award; Coach of the year:	Don Granato - Worcester IceCats
Fred T. Hunt Memorial Award; Sportsmanship / Perseverance:	Kent Hulst - Portland / Providence
Yanick Dupre Memorial Award; Community Service Award:	Mike Minard - St. John's Maple Leafs
Jack A. Butterfield Trophy; MVP of the playoffs:	Steve Begin - Saint John Flames

=== Other awards ===
James C. Hendy Memorial Award; Most outstanding executive:	Stew MacDonald, Saint John Flames
Thomas Ebright Memorial Award; Career contributions:	Bill Torrey
James H. Ellery Memorial Awards; Outstanding media coverage:	Tris Wykes, Norfolk, (newspaper); Bob Crawford, Hartford, (radio); Fox Sports Net, Pittsburgh, (television)
Ken McKenzie Award; Outstanding marketing executive:	Dave Cieslinski, Rochester Americans

== See also ==
- List of AHL seasons

Preceded by 1999–2000 AHL season	AHL seasons	Succeeded by 2001–02 AHL season
