= Denver Cutthroats =

Ice hockey team

- City: Denver, Colorado
- League: Central Hockey League
- Conference: Berry
- Founded: 2012
- Operated: 2012–2014
- Home arena: Denver Coliseum
- Colors: Blue, Green, Red, White
- Owner: John Hayes
- General manager: Derek Armstrong
- Head coach: Brad Smyth

Franchise history
- 2012–2014: Denver Cutthroats

Championships
- Ray Miron President's Cup: None

The Denver Cutthroats were a minor league ice hockey team, as a member of the Central Hockey League, that began play in the 2012–13 season. They served as a farm team of the National Hockey League's Colorado Avalanche and the American Hockey League's Lake Erie Monsters. Based in Denver, Colorado, the Cutthroats played their home games at the Denver Coliseum. On August 20, 2014, after two seasons in the CHL, the Cutthroats announced they would go dormant for the 2014–15 season, with hopes to gain additional investors for 2015–16.

Besides sharing the city/market with their parent club the Avalanche, the Cutthroats were the fifth hockey team to play at the Denver Coliseum, after the original International Hockey League's Denver Mavericks (1958–59), the original Western Hockey League's Denver Invaders (1963–64), the Denver Spurs of the WHL (and later the original Central Hockey League) (1968–75), and finally the IHL's Denver Rangers (1987–89).

== History ==
Reports of a CHL team playing at the Coliseum for 2012-13 came as early as February, with initial reports stating they would be named the Denver Grizzlies, after the city's most recent International Hockey League franchise. The Denver Grizzlies won the Turner Cup in its only season in the city, and is widely credited for garnering enough interest to entice the Quebec Nordiques to relocate to Denver and become the Colorado Avalanche. However, once the team was officially announced on April 10, 2012, it was confirmed the team would not go by the "Denver Grizzlies" name because of unspecified copyright issues (likely related to the Utah Grizzlies ownership of said name). Although the team had registered the "Denver Cutthroats" name with the city and the United States Patent and Trademark Office, the name was still not officially announced, with the team holding a "Guess the Name" contest in the meantime.

On May 17, 2012, the Cutthroats officially announced their name, logo, and color scheme. With the addition of the Cutthroats, the CHL aligned to the one Berry Conference. The Cutthroats opened the season in Denver against the Missouri Mavericks on October 19, marking the first hockey game in the Coliseum since 1989.

The Cutthroats' first season saw them skate to 30 wins, and the eighth seed in the 2013 Ray Miron President's Cup Playoffs. They faced the top seeded (and eventual CHL champions) Allen Americans, and, after taking game one, the Cutthroats lost four straight to lose the series in five games.

In the following 2013–14 season, a vastly improved Cutthroats team, with the help of CHL MVP Garett Bembridge, recorded 38 wins, and the second seed in the Ray Miron President's Cup Playoffs. The Cutthroats won their first playoff series in team history, defeating the Tulsa Oilers in six games before advancing to the finals after a five-game series win over the Arizona Sundogs. This marked the Cutthroats' first berth in the Ray Miron President's Cup Final in only their second year of existence. In the final, the Cutthroats once more faced the defending champions in the Allen Americans who had dispatched them a year earlier. After taking game one, the Cutthroats again lost four straight games, allowing Allen to win back-to-back championships.

After months of rumors, and speculation, on August 20, 2014, the Denver Cutthroats announced an immediate suspension of operations and elected for dormancy for the 2014–15 season. All players of the Cutthroats were rendered free agents, however the Cutthroats planned to seek additional investors to re-join the league for the 2015–16 season, an ambition made moot by the league itself folding several weeks later.

== Staff ==
The Cutthroats were owned by Boulder resident John Hayes, CEO of Broomfield-based Ball Corp. Former NHL player Derek Armstrong served as the Cutthroats' first head coach; although his NHL career had him playing for the New York Islanders, Ottawa Senators, New York Rangers, Los Angeles Kings and St. Louis Blues, he is best remembered in Denver for being a member of the Grizzlies' 1994-95 Turner Cup run. After their inaugural season, Armstrong was joined by former teammate and Cutthroat Brad Smyth as an assistant coach and assistant of hockey operations.

== Season-by-season results ==
=== Regular season ===
Season	Games	Won	Lost	OTL	SOL	Points	Goals for	Goals against	Standing	Avg. attendance
2012–13	66	30	26	2	8	70	205	215	8th, CHL	2,981
2013–14	66	38	17	4	7	87	214	194	2nd, CHL	1,787

=== Playoffs ===
Season	Opening Round	Semi-Finals	Finals	Avg. attendance
2012–13	L, 1–4, Allen	—	—	1,326
2013–14	W, 4–2, Tulsa	W, 4–1, Arizona	L, 1–4, Allen	2,570

== See also ==
- Denver Mavericks
- Denver Invaders
- Denver Spurs
- Denver Rangers
- Denver Grizzlies
- Colorado Eagles
- Rocky Mountain Rage
