= Niklas Hagman =

Finnish ice hockey player (born 1979)

- Hagman with the Dallas Stars in 2008
- Born: December 5, 1979 (age 46) Espoo, Finland
- Height: 6 ft 0 in (183 cm)
- Weight: 210 lb (95 kg; 15 st 0 lb)
- Position: Left wing
- Shot: Left
- Played for: HIFK; Espoo Blues; Kärpät; Florida Panthers; HC Davos; Dallas Stars; Toronto Maple Leafs; Calgary Flames; Anaheim Ducks; Lokomotiv Yaroslavl; Ässät; HC Fribourg-Gottéron; Jokerit; HPK
- National team: Finland
- NHL draft: 70th overall, 1999; Florida Panthers
- Playing career: 1997–2017

Niklas Hagman (born December 5, 1979) is a Finnish former professional ice hockey forward. He was a third-round pick of the Florida Panthers, 70th overall, at the 1999 NHL entry draft and made his National Hockey League (NHL) debut with Florida in 2001. He has also played for the Dallas Stars, Toronto Maple Leafs, Calgary Flames and Anaheim Ducks in the NHL, Lokomotiv Yaroslavl in the KHL, HIFK, Espoo Blues and Kärpät in the SM-liiga and HC Davos in the Swiss National League A.

An accomplished international player, Hagman has represented Finland at three Winter Olympic Games, winning a silver medal in 2006 and bronze at 2010. He played on the Finnish team that reached the final of the 2004 World Cup of Hockey, has appeared in five World Championships and twice played at the World Junior Championships, winning a gold medal in 1998.

== Playing career ==
=== Professional ===
==== Finland ====
Hagman grew up playing with HIFK, appearing with their under-18 and junior teams between 1995 and 1999. He played his first professional games in 1997–98 with HIFK. He appeared in eight games in the SM-liiga, Finland's top league, and scored his first goal. He split the majority of the 1998–99 season between HIFK's senior and junior teams before he was sent to the Espoo Blues to complete the season.

While the Florida Panthers selected Hagman in the third round, 70th overall, at the 1999 NHL entry draft, he remained in Finland. He played with Kärpät of the Mestis, the Finnish second division, in 1999–00, and remained with the team for 2000–01 after they gained promotion to the SM-liiga. He led Kärpät with 28 goals that season and finished second on the team in points.

==== National Hockey League ====
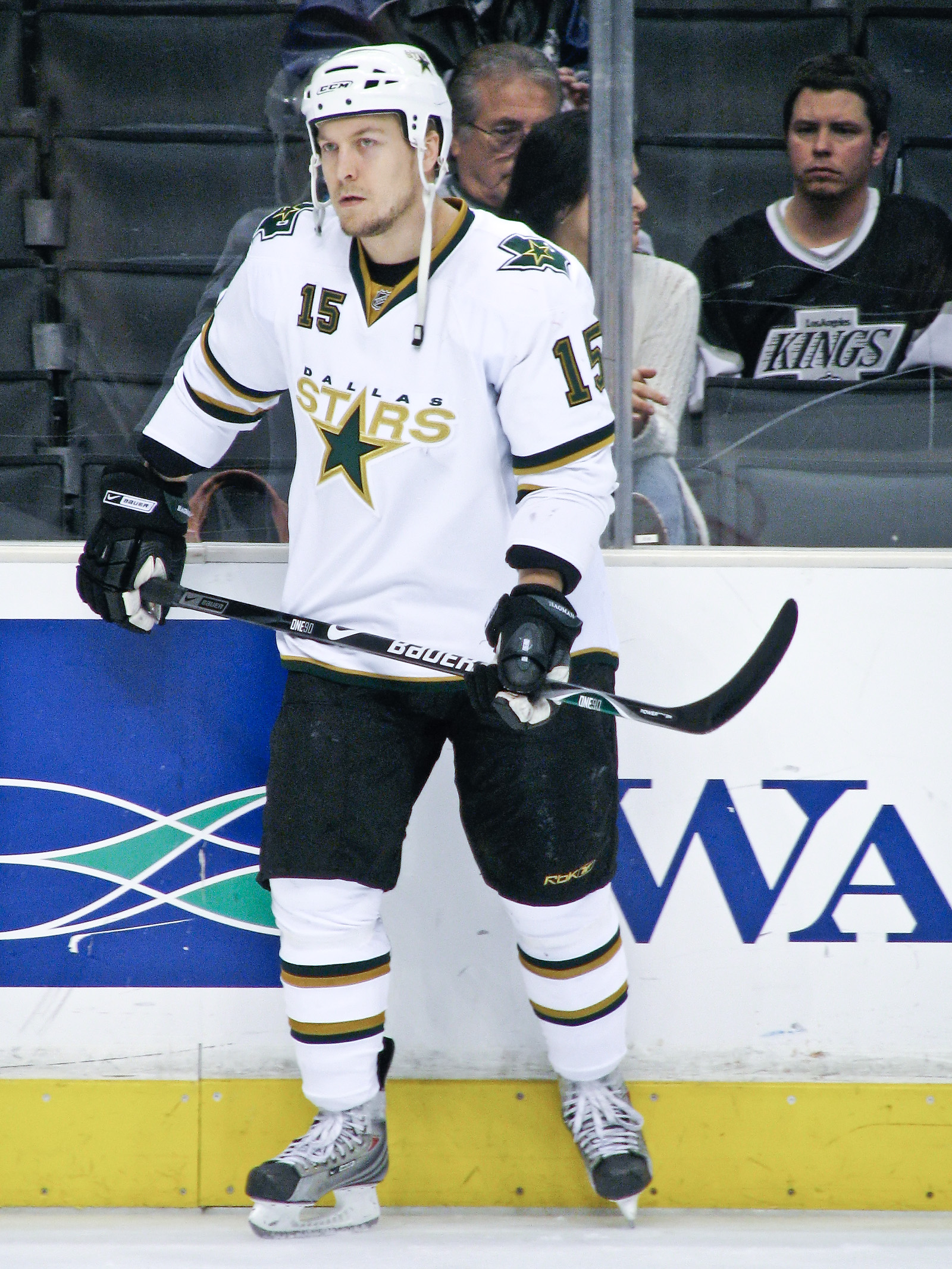
Niklas Hagman in Dallas Stars

Hagman left Finland to join the Panthers for the start of the 2001–02 season. He appeared in 78 games for Florida, scoring 10 goals and 28 points on the season. He was named the NHL's Rookie of the Month for March 2002, and though he fell to 23 points in 2002–03, played in the YoungStars game at the 2003 NHL All-Star Game.

Following another 23-point campaign in 2003–04, Hagman signed with HC Davos of the Swiss National League A as the 2004–05 season was wiped out by a labour dispute. He scored 40 points in 44 games, as Davos won the Swiss championship. He returned to the Panthers to begin the 2005–06 season, but after 30 games, he was traded to the Dallas Stars in exchange for a seventh-round selection at the 2007 NHL entry draft.

Hagman recorded his 100th career NHL point in a 2–1 victory over the Vancouver Canucks on October 23, 2006. He enjoyed his career best season in 2007–08, scoring 27 goals and 41 points. He led the Stars with eight game-winning goals and scored his first hat-trick on February 28, 2008, against the Chicago Blackhawks. An unrestricted free agent following the season, Hagman signed a four-year, US$12 million contract with the Toronto Maple Leafs.

Hagman reached numerous milestones en route to his second 20-goal campaign in 2008–09. He played his 500th NHL game on November 17, 2008, against the Boston Bruins, scored his 200th point on February 22, 2009, against the New York Rangers and his 100th goal on March 28, also against Boston. He spent the majority of the 2009–10 season with the Leafs, and was their leading scorer with 20 goals when he was included in a major trade on January 31, 2010.

The Calgary Flames acquired Hagman, along with Jamal Mayers, Matt Stajan and Ian White, in exchange for Dion Phaneuf, Fredrik Sjöström and Keith Aulie. Hagman finished the season with 25 goals and 44 points split between Toronto and Calgary.

Hagman started the 2011–12 season with the Flames, but was a healthy scratch in six of the first 14 games, and scored only one goal and three assists in the eight games he played. The Flames placed Hagman on waivers and, when he cleared waivers on November 11, assigned him to the American Hockey League's Abbotsford Heat, the Flames' top minor league affiliate. The Flames then placed the winger on re-entry waivers to allow another team to pick him up for only half his salary. He was subsequently claimed by the Anaheim Ducks on November 14, 2011, with the Flames remaining responsible to pay the other half of his salary for the duration of his contract.

==== Europe ====
Following the 2011–12 season, Hagman returned to Europe, signing a deal with Lokomotiv Yaroslavl of the KHL. In the 2012–13 season for Yaroslavl, he played 49 games in the regular season, scoring 12 goals and providing eight assists. This was then followed by a six-game playoff run in which Hagman went scoreless.

In July 2013, the Finnish SM-liiga club Ässät announced that Hagman had signed for a one-year contract.

== International play ==
Medal record

Representing Finland

Ice hockey

Olympic Games
Silver medal – second place	2006 Turin	
Bronze medal – third place	2010 Vancouver	

World Cup
Silver medal – second place	2004 Toronto	

World Junior Championship
Gold medal – first place	1998 Finland	

Hagman first represented his country internationally as a member of the Finnish junior team at the 1998 World Junior Ice Hockey Championships. The tournament was held in Helsinki, and though the Finns were not expected to be contenders, they ultimately won the gold medal. Hagman scored the championship winning goal in overtime to defeat the Russians. He described winning the championship in his home country as being one of the greatest achievements of his career. He again played with the Finnish junior team at the 1999 tournament, but the Finns were unable to duplicate their success, finishing fifth.

An injury to Ville Peltonen shortly before the 2002 Winter Olympics opened up a chance for Hagman to represent the Finnish senior team for the first time. He appeared in four games for the Finns, scoring one goal. Later that spring, he played his first of four consecutive World Championships. He played in the 2004 World Cup of Hockey, scoring one goal in five games for Finland, who finished as the tournament runners-up to Canada.

Hagman made his second Olympic appearance at the 2006 Winter Games in Turin. He scored only one assist in eight games, but was part of a strong team defence that allowed only five goals in seven games as Finland found itself in the gold medal final against Sweden. The Finns lost the game, 3–2, and settled for the silver medal. It was a result Hagman found disappointing, especially in losing to Finland's arch-rivals in hockey. Hagman played his third Olympics at the 2010 Vancouver Games. Following a devastating 6–1 loss to the United States in the semi-final, Finland found itself trailing Slovakia by a 3–1 score entering the third period of the bronze medal game. Hagman sparked a four-goal outburst in the final period, scoring on the powerplay five minutes into the frame to bring the Finns within one goal before teammate Olli Jokinen scored both tying and winning goals. For Hagman, the bronze represented his second Olympic medal.

== Personal life ==
Hagman's father Matti was the first Finnish player to play in the NHL, and they are the first Finnish father and son to have played in the League. His uncle is Kai Haaskivi, a retired professional football (soccer) player and former member of the Finnish national team and his cousin is the actor Olli Haaskivi. Hagman announced his engagement to Finnish model and first runner-up of Miss Finland 2003, Piritta Hannula, in Spring 2005. They were married on July 8, 2006, in Helsinki. They have a son named Lukas, born in February 2007. Their daughter Lila was born in September 2009. In March 2018, Niklas and Piritta Hagman filed a request for divorce. The divorce became legal in December same year.

In 2019, Hagman was a contestant on the third season of Selviytyjät Suomi, the Finnish version of Survivor. He was the second person voted out on the fifth day of the season, placing 15th.

== Career statistics ==
=== Regular season and playoffs ===
			Regular season					Playoffs
Season	Team	League	GP	G	A	Pts	PIM	GP	G	A	Pts	PIM
1995–96	HIFK	FIN U18	26	12	21	33	32	4	3	0	3	2
1995–96	HIFK	FIN U20	12	3	1	4	0	—	—	—	—	—
1996–97	HIFK	FIN U18	21	19	12	31	46	4	1	1	2	0
1996–97	HIFK	FIN U20	30	13	12	25	30	—	—	—	—	—
1997–98	HIFK	FIN U18	1	0	1	1	0	—	—	—	—	—
1997–98	HIFK	FIN U20	26	9	5	14	16	—	—	—	—	—
1997–98	HIFK	SM-l	8	1	0	1	0	—	—	—	—	—
1998–99	HIFK	FIN U20	14	4	9	13	43	—	—	—	—	—
1998–99	HIFK	SM-l	17	1	1	2	14	—	—	—	—	—
1998–99	Espoo Blues	SM-l	14	1	1	2	2	4	1	0	1	0
1999–2000	Kärpät	FIN U20	4	7	3	10	0	—	—	—	—	—
1999–2000	Kärpät	FIN.2	41	17	18	35	12	7	4	2	6	0
2000–01	Kärpät	SM-l	56	28	18	46	32	8	3	1	4	0
2001–02	Florida Panthers	NHL	78	10	18	28	8	—	—	—	—	—
2002–03	Florida Panthers	NHL	80	8	15	23	20	—	—	—	—	—
2003–04	Florida Panthers	NHL	75	10	13	23	22	—	—	—	—	—
2004–05	HC Davos	NLA	44	17	22	39	20	15	10	7	17	6
2005–06	Florida Panthers	NHL	30	2	4	6	2	—	—	—	—	—
2005–06	Dallas Stars	NHL	54	6	9	15	16	5	2	1	3	4
2006–07	Dallas Stars	NHL	82	17	12	29	34	7	0	1	1	10
2007–08	Dallas Stars	NHL	82	27	14	41	51	18	2	1	3	14
2008–09	Toronto Maple Leafs	NHL	65	22	20	42	4	—	—	—	—	—
2009–10	Toronto Maple Leafs	NHL	55	20	13	33	23	—	—	—	—	—
2009–10	Calgary Flames	NHL	27	5	6	11	2	—	—	—	—	—
2010–11	Calgary Flames	NHL	71	11	16	27	24	—	—	—	—	—
2011–12	Calgary Flames	NHL	8	1	3	4	2	—	—	—	—	—
2011–12	Anaheim Ducks	NHL	63	8	11	19	12	—	—	—	—	—
2012–13	Lokomotiv Yaroslavl	KHL	49	12	8	20	27	6	0	0	0	10
2013–14	Ässät	Liiga	44	21	17	38	36	—	—	—	—	—
2013–14	HC Fribourg–Gottéron	NLA	4	1	4	5	2	10	3	3	6	16
2014–15	Jokerit	KHL	46	19	9	28	32	10	2	0	2	6
2015–16	Jokerit	KHL	44	5	9	14	20	5	2	0	2	2
2016–17	Kärpät	Liiga	14	2	4	6	2	—	—	—	—	—
2016–17	HPK	Liiga	17	4	5	9	35	7	0	0	0	0
SM-l/Liiga totals			170	58	46	104	121	19	4	1	5	0
NHL totals			770	147	154	301	220	30	4	3	7	28
KHL totals			139	36	26	62	79	21	4	0	4	18

=== International ===
Year	Team	Event	GP	G	A	Pts	PIM
1998	Finland	WJC	7	4	1	5	0
1999	Finland	WJC	6	3	5	8	2
2002	Finland	OG	4	1	2	3	0
2002	Finland	WC	9	5	2	7	2
2003	Finland	WC	7	2	1	3	14
2004	Finland	WC	5	0	0	0	0
2004	Finland	WCH	5	1	0	1	2
2005	Finland	WC	7	2	0	2	2
2006	Finland	OG	8	0	1	1	2
2009	Finland	WC	7	1	5	6	0
2010	Finland	OG	6	4	2	6	2
2013	Finland	WC	10	1	0	1	4
Junior totals			13	7	6	13	2
Senior totals			68	17	13	30	28

== See also ==
- Notable families in the NHL
