= 1997 IIHF European U18 Championship =

The 1997 IIHF European U18 Championship was the thirtieth playing of the IIHF European Junior Championships.

== Group A ==
Played April 12 to the 20th, in Znojmo and Třebíč, Czech Republic. Switzerland shocked everyone by opening the tournament with wins over the Czechs and the Russians. Although they tired by the end of the tournament, their win over Slovakia assured them of their first (and only) medal in the European Juniors.

=== First round ===
Group 1

| Team | SUI | CZE | RUS | UKR | GF/GA | Points |
|---|---|---|---|---|---|---|
| 1. Switzerland | | 4:3 | 6:2 | 2:4 | 12:9 | 4 |
| 2. Czech Republic | 3:4 | | 4:4 | 8:1 | 15:9 | 3 |
| 3. Russia | 2:6 | 4:4 | | 8:2 | 14:12 | 3 |
| 4. Ukraine | 4:2 | 1:8 | 2:8 | | 7:18 | 2 |

Group 2

| Team | FIN | SWE | SVK | GER | GF/GA | Points |
|---|---|---|---|---|---|---|
| 1. Finland | | 3:3 | 5:0 | 3:0 | 11:3 | 5 |
| 2. Sweden | 3:3 | | 6:2 | 6:3 | 15:8 | 5 |
| 3. Slovakia | 0:5 | 2:6 | | 7:2 | 9:13 | 2 |
| 4. Germany | 0:3 | 3:6 | 2:7 | | 5:16 | 0 |

=== Final round ===
Championship round

| Team | FIN | SWE | SUI | RUS | CZE | SVK | GF | Points |
|---|---|---|---|---|---|---|---|---|
| 1. Finland | | (3:3) | 8:1 | 4:2 | 3:2 | (5:0) | 23:8 | 9 |
| 2. Sweden | (3:3) | | 4:2 | 4:4 | 4:1 | (6:2) | 21:12 | 8 |
| 3. Switzerland | 1:8 | 2:4 | | (6:2) | (4:3) | 3:0 | 16:17 | 6 |
| 4. Russia | 2:4 | 4:4 | (2:6) | | (4:4) | 8:3 | 20:21 | 4 |
| 5. Czech Republic | 2:3 | 1:4 | (3:4) | (4:4) | | 4:2 | 14:17 | 3 |
| 6. Slovakia | (0:5) | (2:6) | 0:3 | 3:8 | 2:4 | | 7:26 | 0 |

7th place

| Ukraine | 2:1 (1:0, 0:1, 1:0) | 2:5 (0:3, 2:0, 0:2) | 2:1 o.t. (1:0, 0:1, 0:0, 1:0) | Germany |

Germany, losing the best of three series in overtime, was relegated to Group B for 1998.

== Tournament Awards ==
- Top Scorer (Finland) Marko Kauppinen (9 points)
- Top Goalie: (Finland) Mika Noronen
- Top Defenceman: (Sweden) Jonas Elofsson
- Top Forward: (Switzerland) Michel Riesen

Kauppinen, a defenceman, set a record for the lowest point total to lead a tournament.

== Group B ==
Played March 21 to the 30th, in Maribor and Celje, Slovenia.

=== First round ===
Group 1

| Team | NOR | POL | BLR | SLO | GF/GA | Points |
|---|---|---|---|---|---|---|
| 1. Norway | | 4:2 | 5:2 | 3:4 | 12:8 | 4 |
| 2. Poland | 2:4 | | 7:3 | 4:2 | 13:9 | 4 |
| 3. Belarus | 2:5 | 3:7 | | 5:4 | 10:16 | 2 |
| 4. Slovenia | 4:3 | 2:4 | 4:5 | | 10:12 | 2 |

Group 2

| Team | DEN | HUN | FRA | ITA | GF/GA | Points |
|---|---|---|---|---|---|---|
| 1. Denmark | | 4:3 | 6:4 | 6:0 | 16:7 | 6 |
| 2. Hungary | 3:4 | | 5:3 | 6:5 | 14:12 | 4 |
| 3. France | 4:6 | 3:5 | | 6:5 | 13:16 | 2 |
| 4. Italy | 0:6 | 5:6 | 5:6 | | 10:18 | 0 |

=== Final round ===
Championship round

| Team | NOR | POL | HUN | BLR | DEN | FRA | Team | Points |
|---|---|---|---|---|---|---|---|---|
| 1. Norway | | (4:2) | 2:2 | (5:2) | 4:3 | 2:2 | 17:11 | 8 |
| 2. Poland | (2:4) | | 5:5 | (7:3) | 6:4 | 3:1 | 23:17 | 7 |
| 3. Hungary | 2:2 | 5:5 | | 1:1 | (3:4) | (5:3) | 16:15 | 5 |
| 4. Belarus | (2:5) | (3:7) | 1:1 | | 4:2 | 8:6 | 18:21 | 5 |
| 5. Denmark | 3:4 | 4:6 | (4:3) | 2:4 | | (6:4) | 19:21 | 4 |
| 6. France | 2:2 | 1:3 | (3:5) | 6:8 | (4:6) | | 16:24 | 1 |

7th place

| Italy | 7:3 (3:1, 3:0, 1:2) | 7:2 (3:0, 4:1, 0:1) | Slovenia |

Norway was promoted to Group A, and Slovenia was relegated to Group C, for 1998.

== Group C ==
Played March 12 to the 16th in Miercurea-Ciuc and Gheorgheni, Romania.

=== First round ===
Group 1

| Team | GBR | EST | ROM | NED | GF/GA | Points |
|---|---|---|---|---|---|---|
| 1. Great Britain | | 8:0 | 5:2 | 3:1 | 16:3 | 6 |
| 2. Estonia | 0:8 | | 3:2 | 8:4 | 11:14 | 4 |
| 3. Romania | 2:5 | 2:3 | | 5:0 | 9:8 | 2 |
| 4. Netherlands | 1:3 | 4:8 | 0:5 | | 5:16 | 0 |

Group 2

| Team | LAT | AUT | LTU | CRO | GF/GA | Points |
|---|---|---|---|---|---|---|
| 1. Latvia | | 3:3 | 10:2 | 5:1 | 18:6 | 5 |
| 2. Austria | 3:3 | | 6:1 | 1:0 | 10:4 | 5 |
| 3. Lithuania | 2:10 | 1:6 | | 5:2 | 8:18 | 2 |
| 4. Croatia | 1:5 | 0:1 | 2:5 | | 3:11 | 0 |

=== Placing round ===
| 7th place | Croatia | 2:1 (1:0, 1:0, 0:1) | Netherlands |
| 5th place | Romania | 4:2 (1:0, 1:2, 2:0) | Lithuania |
| 3rd place | Estonia | 4:3 o.t. (2:1, 0:0, 1:2, 1:0) | Austria |
| Final | Great Britain | 4:3 (0:2, 3:0, 1:1) | Latvia |

Great Britain was promoted to Group B and the Netherlands was relegated to Group D, for 1998.

== Group D ==
Played in Belgrade, FR Yugoslavia from March 4 to 9. The hosts completely dominated, with forward Csaba Prokec scoring 29 points in their 5 games.

| Team | YUG | ESP | BUL | ISR | ISL | TUR | GF/GA | Points |
|---|---|---|---|---|---|---|---|---|
| 1. Yugoslavia | | 11:0 | 16:2 | 14:2 | 21:0 | 52:1 | 114:5 | 10 |
| 2. Spain | 0:11 | | 5:3 | 3:3 | 11:6 | 20:3 | 39:26 | 7 |
| 3. Bulgaria | 2:16 | 3:5 | | 5:3 | 5:2 | 7:0 | 22:26 | 6 |
| 4. Israel | 2:14 | 3:3 | 3:5 | | 9:5 | 13:0 | 30:27 | 5 |
| 5. Iceland | 0:21 | 6:11 | 2:5 | 5:9 | | 4:2 | 17:48 | 2 |
| 6. Turkey | 1:52 | 3:20 | 0:7 | 0:13 | 2:4 | | 6:96 | 0 |

Yugoslavia was promoted to Group C for 1998.
