= Derek Armstrong (ice hockey) =

Canadian ice hockey player and coach

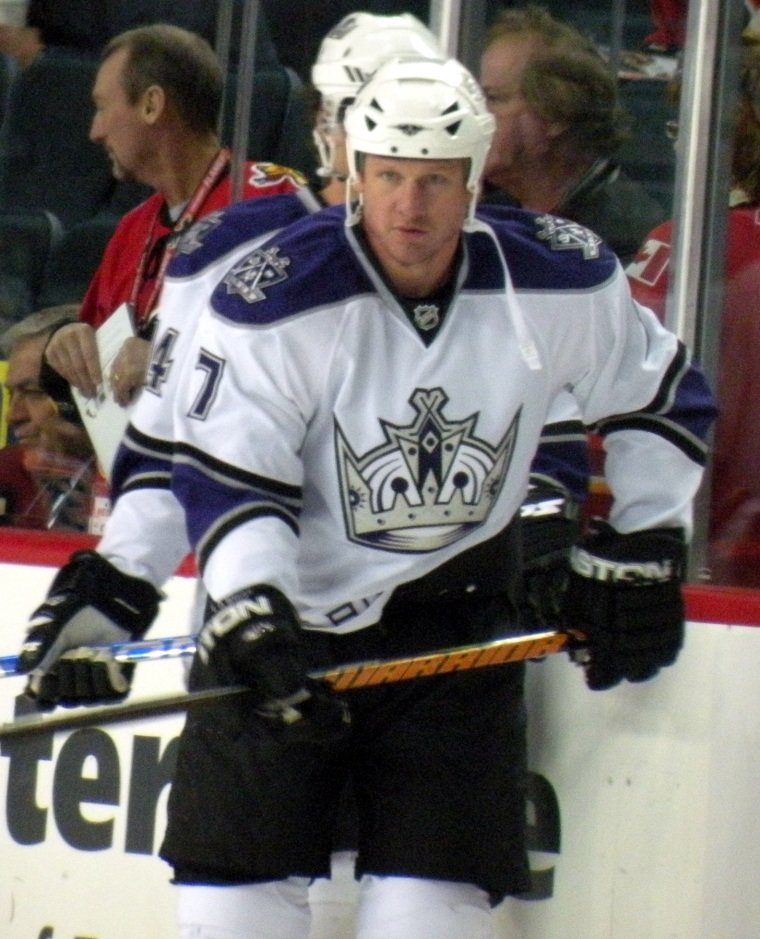
- Armstrong with the Los Angeles Kings in 2009
- Born: April 23, 1973 (age 53) Ottawa, Ontario, Canada
- Height: 6 ft 0 in (183 cm)
- Weight: 197 lb (89 kg; 14 st 1 lb)
- Position: Center
- Shot: Right
- Played for: New York Islanders; Ottawa Senators; New York Rangers; Los Angeles Kings; St. Louis Blues
- NHL draft: 128th overall, 1992; New York Islanders
- Playing career: 1993–2010

Derek Armstrong (born April 23, 1973) is a Canadian professional ice hockey coach and former player. Armstrong played in the National Hockey League, where he played for the New York Islanders, Ottawa Senators, New York Rangers, Los Angeles Kings and the St. Louis Blues.

== Playing career ==
Derek Armstrong spent the majority of his NHL career with the Los Angeles Kings. After being taken by the New York Islanders in the sixth round, 128th overall of the 1992 NHL entry draft, Armstrong finally played his first full NHL campaign in the 2002–03 season, after having spent eight years playing both in the minors and the NHL, with the Islanders, Ottawa Senators, New York Rangers and finally the Kings. Most of his non-NHL stints were in the two "AAA" North American development leagues: American Hockey League and International Hockey League.

Due to the NHL lockout, as some NHL players did, Armstrong went to Europe, to play hockey in the Swiss National League A, for SC Rapperswil-Jona, totaling 17 points in only 12 games. Statistically, his best season was the 2006–07 campaign when he had 44 points for seventh place in Kings' points that year.

Armstrong signed with the St. Louis Blues on September 8, 2009, where he finished his final pro season playing for his former LA King coach, Andy Murray.

== Coaching career ==
On April 11, 2012, Armstrong was named head coach of the Denver Cutthroats of the Central Hockey League. Despite his NHL career, he is best known in Denver for being part of the Denver Grizzlies' 1994-95 Turner Cup championship in the team's only season in Denver (though they later moved to Salt Lake City and become the Utah Grizzlies, the team's success is widely credited for attracting the Quebec Nordiques to Denver that following offseason, where they became the Colorado Avalanche). After two seasons with the Denver Cutthroats as head coach, Armstrong was then appointed as team president. The team suspended operations in 2014 and finally folded permanently one year later when the league ceased operations.

== Career statistics ==
			Regular season					Playoffs
Season	Team	League	GP	G	A	Pts	PIM	GP	G	A	Pts	PIM
1989–90	Hawkesbury Hawks	CJHL	48	8	10	18	30	—	—	—	—	—
1990–91	Hawkesbury Hawks	CJHL	54	27	45	72	49	—	—	—	—	—
1990–91	Sudbury Wolves	OHL	2	0	2	2	0	—	—	—	—	—
1991–92	Sudbury Wolves	OHL	66	31	54	85	22	9	2	2	4	2
1992–93	Sudbury Wolves	OHL	66	44	62	106	56	14	9	10	19	26
1993–94	Salt Lake Golden Eagles	IHL	76	23	35	58	61	—	—	—	—	—
1993–94	New York Islanders	NHL	1	0	0	0	0	—	—	—	—	—
1994–95	Denver Grizzlies	IHL	59	13	18	31	65	6	0	2	2	0
1995–96	Worcester IceCats	AHL	51	11	15	26	33	4	2	1	3	0
1995–96	New York Islanders	NHL	19	1	3	4	14	—	—	—	—	—
1996–97	Utah Grizzlies	IHL	17	4	8	12	10	6	0	4	4	4
1996–97	New York Islanders	NHL	50	6	7	13	33	—	—	—	—	—
1997–98	Detroit Vipers	IHL	10	0	1	1	2	—	—	—	—	—
1997–98	Hartford Wolf Pack	AHL	54	16	30	46	40	15	2	6	8	22
1997–98	Ottawa Senators	NHL	9	2	0	2	9	—	—	—	—	—
1998–99	New York Rangers	NHL	3	0	0	0	0	—	—	—	—	—
1998–99	Hartford Wolf Pack	AHL	59	29	51	80	73	7	5	4	9	10
1999–2000	Hartford Wolf Pack	AHL	77	28	54	82	101	23	7	16	23	24
1999–2000	New York Rangers	NHL	1	0	0	0	0	—	—	—	—	—
2000–01	Hartford Wolf Pack	AHL	75	32	69	101	73	5	0	6	6	6
2000–01	New York Rangers	NHL	3	0	0	0	0	—	—	—	—	—
2001–02	SC Bern	NLA	44	17	36	53	62	6	3	5	8	8
2002–03	Manchester Monarchs	AHL	2	3	0	3	4	—	—	—	—	—
2002–03	Los Angeles Kings	NHL	66	12	26	38	30	—	—	—	—	—
2003–04	Los Angeles Kings	NHL	57	14	21	35	33	—	—	—	—	—
2004–05	Genève–Servette HC	NLA	9	6	7	13	18	—	—	—	—	—
2004–05	SC Rapperswil–Jona	NLA	3	1	3	4	4	—	—	—	—	—
2005–06	Los Angeles Kings	NHL	62	13	28	41	46	—	—	—	—	—
2006–07	Los Angeles Kings	NHL	67	11	33	44	62	—	—	—	—	—
2007–08	Los Angeles Kings	NHL	77	8	27	35	63	—	—	—	—	—
2008–09	Los Angeles Kings	NHL	56	5	4	9	63	—	—	—	—	—
2009–10	St. Louis Blues	NHL	6	0	0	0	2	—	—	—	—	—
2009–10	Peoria Rivermen	AHL	46	17	19	36	21	—	—	—	—	—
NHL totals			477	72	149	221	355	—	—	—	—	—
AHL totals			364	136	238	374	345	54	16	33	49	62

== Awards and honours ==
Award	Year
AHL Second All-Star Team	1999–2000
Jack A. Butterfield Trophy - Calder Cup Playoffs MVP	1999–2000
AHL First All-Star Team	2000–01
John B. Sollenberger Trophy - AHL Top Scorer	2000–01
Les Cunningham Award - AHL Most Valuable Player	2000–01
CHL Coach of the Year	2013–14
