= Denis Khlopotnov =

Russian ice hockey player

- Born: January 27, 1978 (age 48) Moscow, USSR
- Height: 6 ft 4 in (193 cm)
- Weight: 209 lb (95 kg; 14 st 13 lb)
- Position: Goaltender
- Caught: Left
- Played for: HC CSKA Moscow; Metallurg Magnitogorsk; HC Spartak Moscow; Khimik Moscow Oblast
- National team: Russia
- NHL draft: 209th overall, 1996; Florida Panthers
- Playing career: 1996–2004

Denis Khlopotnov (born January 27, 1978) is a Russian former professional ice hockey goaltender. He played in the Russian Superleague for HC CSKA Moscow, Metallurg Magnitogorsk, HC Spartak Moscow and Khimik Moscow Oblast. He was drafted 209th overall by the Florida Panthers in the 1996 NHL entry draft.
