= Third Man (disambiguation) =

The Third Man is a 1949 film noir directed by Carol Reed.

Third Man may also refer to:

== Art, entertainment, and media ==
- The Third Man, a novella written in 1948 by Graham Greene as a treatment for the 1949 film
- The Third Man: Life at the Heart of New Labour, a book by Peter Mandelson
- Third Man Records, an independent record label owned by musician Jack White
- The Third Man (album), a 2007 album by Enrico Rava and Stefano Bollani
- "The Third Man Theme", zither instrumental written by Anton Karas
- The Third Man (TV series), a British-American television series broadcast from 1959 to 1965
- "The Third Man" (Supernatural), an episode of the television series Supernatural

== Other uses ==
- Third Man, a member of the Cambridge Five spy ring ultimately revealed as Kim Philby (1912–1988)
- Third man argument, a philosophical argument attributed to Plato
- Third man factor, situations where an unseen presence provides comfort or support during traumatic experiences
- Third man, a cricket position
- Third man in, a rule pertaining to fighting in ice hockey providing for the ejection of a player who joins a fight already in progress

== See also ==
- Third Man on the Mountain (1950), a 1959 film directed by Ken Annakin
- Third Man Out, a 2005 film directed by Ron Oliver
- Third wheel (disambiguation)
