= Overhead =

Overhead may be:

== Ancillary support ==
Referring to ancillary support:

- Overhead (business), the ongoing operating costs of running a business
- Overhead (engineering), ancillary implementation required to achieve a design goal
  - Overhead (computing), ancillary implementation required to achieve a software design goal
  - Protocol overhead, encoding overhead or overhead information, additional bandwidth used by a communications protocol

== Above the head ==
Referring to something above the head:

- Overhead cable, a signal transmission cable suspended in the air
- Overhead crane or bridge crane, a type of crane that slides on rails above workers
- Overhead join, an air traffic control pattern
- Overhead line, a power transmission line suspended in the air
- Overhead press, an upper-body weight-training exercise
- Overhead projector, a display system that projects above the heads of the audience
- Overhead storage, storage located above the head (often above seats on aircraft and trains)

== Other ==
- Overhead cam, a design aspect of an engine that indicates the camshaft is above the combustion chamber

== See also ==
- Overkill (disambiguation)
