= Overkill =

Overkill is the use of force that far exceeds what is necessary to achieve a desired goal. It may be a literal term referring to physical damage, though it is also used in colloquial conversation as a metaphor.

It may also refer to:

== Characters ==
- Overkill (G.I. Joe), a character in the G.I. Joe universe
- Overkill (Transformers), a character in the Transformers universe
- Overkill, a character in the Marvel Comics O-Force team
- Scarlet Overkill, main antagonist in Minions (2015 film)

== Games ==
- Overkill (Flying Buffalo), a 1977 role-playing game adventure
- OverKill (video game), a 1992 vertical scrolling shooter
- The House of the Dead: Overkill, a 2009 rail shooter gun game
- Overkill Software, a Swedish video game developer
- Overkills, finishing moves in the video games Eternal Champions and Eternal Champions: Challenge from the Dark Side

== Literature ==
- Overkill (comic book), a British comics anthology
- Overkill (novel), a 2007 novel by Vanda Symon
- Overkill, a 1966 spy novel by William Garner
- Overkill, a 2001 true crime book by Lyn Riddle about the 1991 murder of Laurie Show

== Music ==
- Overkill (band), an American thrash metal band from New Jersey
  - Overkill (EP) an EP by the New Jersey band, or the title song
- Overkill L.A., originally Overkill, an American speed metal/hardcore band from Los Angeles
- Overkill (Motörhead album), a 1979 album by Motörhead
  - "Overkill" (Motörhead song), 1979
- Overkill (Savant album), 2013
- "Overkill" (Men at Work song), 1983
- "Overkill", a song by Holly Humberstone from Falling Asleep at the Wheel, 2020
- "Overkill", a song by Kosheen from Damage, 2007
- "Overkill", a song by MC Cheung from This is MC, 2023
- Overkiller, a music DVD by Die Ärzte

== Science and technology ==
- Overkill hypothesis, a proposed cause of Quaternary extinction
- Surplus killing, when a predator kills more prey than it can eat

== Television and film ==
- "Overkill" (Murder Most Horrid), a television episode
- Overkill, a 1987 film directed by Ulli Lommel
- Overkill, a fictional weapon in Space Patrol Orion

== See also ==
- Overexploitation, depletion of a natural resource through overharvesting
  - Overfishing
- Superfluous (disambiguation)
- Third wheel (disambiguation)
