= Fighting in ice hockey =

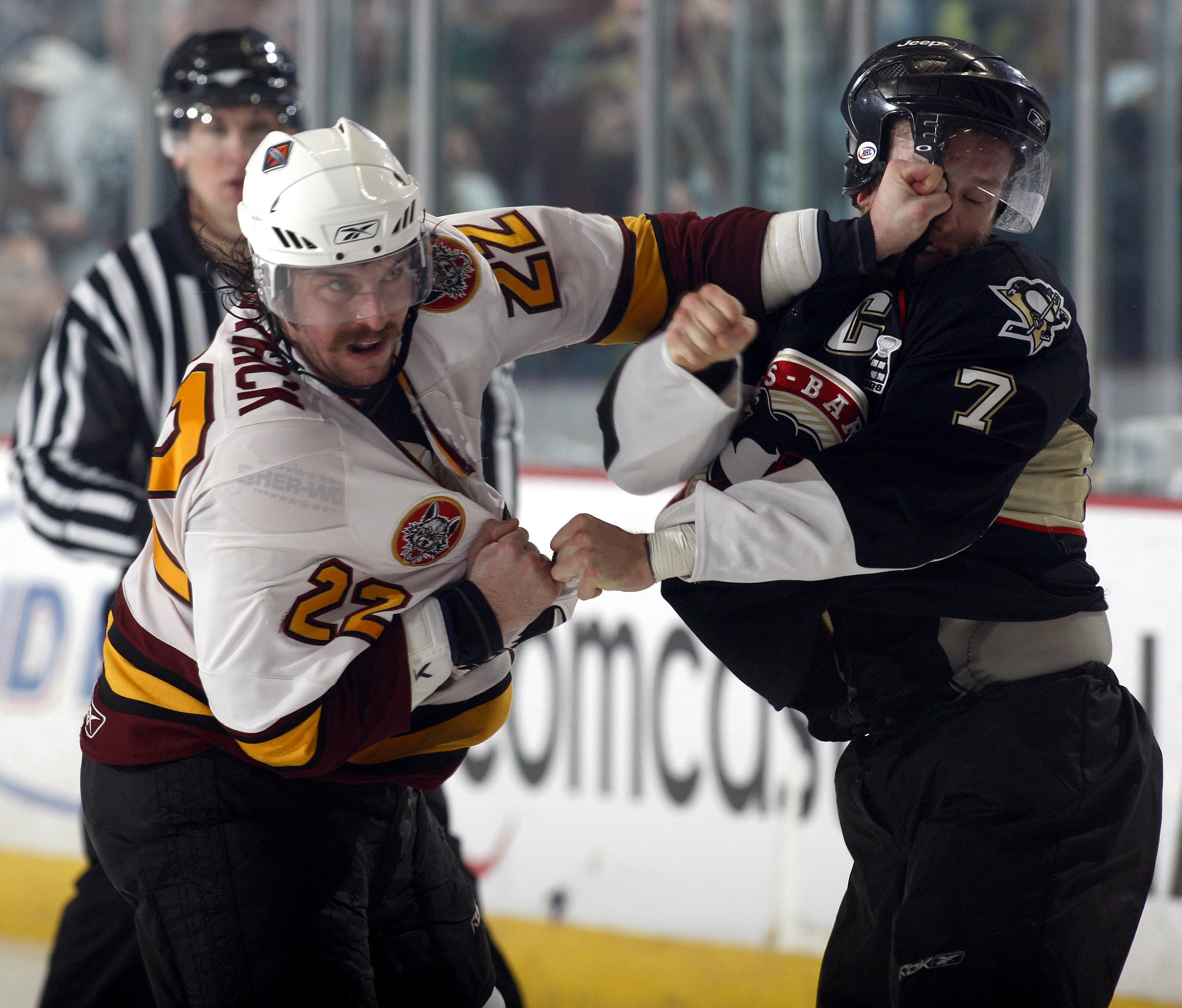
Chicago Wolves defenseman Nathan Oystrick (left) and Wilkes-Barre/Scranton Penguins forward Nathan Smith (right) fighting during the 2008 Calder Cup finals, as a linesman watches behind them.

Fighting is an established tradition in North American ice hockey, with a long history that involves many levels of amateur and professional play and includes some notable individual fights. Fights may be fought by enforcers, or "goons" (French: bagarreurs)—players whose role is to fight and intimidate—on a given team, and are governed by a system of unwritten rules that players, coaches, officials, and the media refer to as "the code". Some fights are spontaneous, while others are premeditated by the participants. While officials tolerate fighting during hockey games, they impose a variety of penalties on players who engage in fights.

Unique among North American professional team sports, the National Hockey League (NHL) and most minor professional leagues in North America do not eject players outright for fighting (although they may do so for more flagrant violations as part of a fight) but major European and collegiate hockey leagues do, and multi-game suspensions may be added on top of the ejection. Therefore, the vast majority of fights occur in the NHL and other North American professional leagues. Fighting in women's ice hockey is rare but not unknown.

Physical play in hockey, consisting of allowed techniques such as checking and prohibited techniques such as elbowing, high-sticking, and cross-checking, is linked to fighting. Although often a target of criticism, it is a considerable draw for the sport, and some fans attend games primarily to see fights. Those who defend fighting in hockey say that it helps deter other types of rough play, allows teams to protect their star players, and creates a sense of solidarity among teammates. The debate over allowing fighting in ice hockey games is ongoing. Despite its potentially negative consequences, such as heavier enforcers (or "heavyweights") knocking each other out, administrators at the professional level have no plans to eliminate fighting from the game, as most players consider it essential. Most fans and players oppose eliminating fights from professional hockey games, but considerable opposition to fighting exists, and efforts to eliminate it continue.

== History ==
Fighting has been a part of ice hockey since the sport's rise in popularity in 19th century Canada. There are a number of theories behind the integration of fighting into the game; the most common is that the relative lack of rules in the early history of hockey encouraged physical intimidation and control. Other theories include the poverty and high crime rates of local Canada in the 19th century. There was also an influence from working-class lacrosse players, who transitioned to ice hockey when lacrosse adopted an amateur-only policy in Canada, and who were accustomed to a violently aggressive form of play. The implementation of some features, such as the blue lines in 1918, actually encouraged fighting due to the increased level of physical play. Creation of the blue lines allowed forward passing, but only in the neutral zone. Therefore, puck handlers played at close quarters and were subject to a great deal of physical play. The emergence of enforcers, who protected the puck handlers and fought when necessary, followed shortly thereafter.

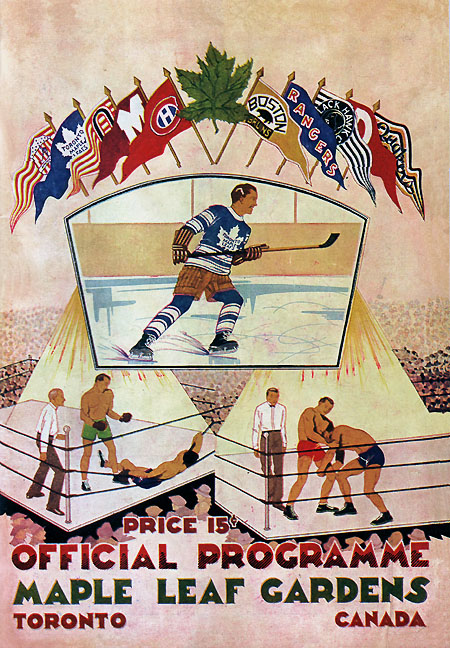
Cover of a 1931 programme guide for Maple Leaf Gardens, showcasing both the National Hockey League and boxing.

In 1922, the NHL introduced Rule 56, which formally regulated fighting, or "fisticuffs" as it was called in the official NHL rulebook. Rather than ejecting players from the game, as was the practice in amateur and collegiate hockey, players would be given a five-minute major penalty. Rule 56 and its language also filtered down to the minor professional and junior leagues in North America. Promoters such as Tex Rickard of Madison Square Garden, who also promoted boxing events, saw financial opportunities in hockey fights and devised marketing campaigns around the rivalries between various team enforcers.

In the current NHL rulebook, the archaic reference to "fisticuffs" has been removed; fighting is now governed under Rule 46 in the NHL rulebook. Referees are given considerable latitude in determining what exactly constitutes a fight and what penalties are applicable to the participants. Significant modifications from the original rule involve penalties which can be assessed to a fight participant deemed to have instigated the fight and additional penalties resulting from instigating a fight while wearing a face-shield.

Although fighting was rarer from the 1920s through the 1960s, it was often brutal in nature; author Ross Bernstein said of the game's early years that it "was probably more like rugby on skates than it was modern hockey." Star players were also known to fight for themselves during the Original Six era, when fewer teams existed than in later years. However, as the NHL's expansion in the late 1960s created more roster spots and spread star players more widely throughout the league, enforcers (who usually possess limited overall skill sets) became more common. Multiple fights during the era received significant media attention. In an NHL preseason game between the Boston Bruins and St. Louis Blues in 1969, Bruins defenceman Ted Green and Blues left wing Wayne Maki engaged in a bloody stick-swinging fight. The fight, initiated by Maki, resulted in Green sustaining a skull fracture. In 1978, World Hockey Association Birmingham Bulls enforcer Dave Hanson, known for his 11-year professional career, fought Hall of Famer Bobby Hull and in the process got Hull's wig caught in his knuckles. The incident landed Hanson in the news, and irate Winnipeg fans attempted to assault him on his way out of the arena. Hanson appeared in the 1977 movie Slap Shot, a comedy about hockey violence.

The rise of the "Broad Street Bullies" in the 1973–74 and 1974–75 Philadelphia Flyers served as an example for future NHL enforcers. The average number of fights per game rose above 1.0 during the 1980s, peaking at 1.17 in 1983–84. That season, a bench-clearing brawl broke out at the end of the second period of a second-round playoff matchup between the Quebec Nordiques and the Montreal Canadiens. A second bench-clearing brawl erupted before the third period began, provoked by the announcement of penalties; a total of 252 penalty minutes were incurred and 11 players were ejected. This game is commonly referred to as the Good Friday Massacre.

North American competitive amateur leagues serve as a training ground and emulate the practices and conduct of professional leagues. Around age 12 players begin to be chosen for size and toughness, play becomes rough, and less-violent players drop out in large numbers. 34% of Toronto amateur skaters aged 12–21 reported being in at least one fist-fight during the 1975–76 season with the likelihood of fighting increasing with player age and competitive level. Coaches of the time trained players to fight in self-defence or against players who commit flagrant fouls. Players did not consider fist-fights to be violent, reserving this term for acts which were more likely to cause injury. Among professional players, those who refused to fight were seen as untrustworthy and a challenge to team morale and such players could gain a reputation for being easily intimidated. Those who fought excessively were seen as displaying a lack of judgement and "game sense".

Many NHL teams signed enforcers to protect and fight for smaller offensive stars. Fights in the 1990s included the Brawl in Hockeytown in 1997, in which the Colorado Avalanche and Detroit Red Wings engaged in nine fights, including bouts between Darren McCarty and Claude Lemieux and goaltenders Patrick Roy and Mike Vernon. The following year, a game between the Avalanche and Red Wings involved a fight between goaltenders Chris Osgood and Roy after which they received minor, major, and game misconduct penalties. In 2004, a Philadelphia Flyers – Ottawa Senators game resulted in five consecutive brawls in the closing minutes of the game, including fights between many players who are not known as enforcers and a fight between Flyers goaltender Robert Esche and Senators goaltender Patrick Lalime. The game ended with an NHL record 419 penalty minutes, and an NHL record 20 players were ejected, leaving five players on the team benches. The officials took 90 minutes to sort out the penalties that each team had received.

Hockey fights per NHL season
Season	Number of fights
2014–15	391
2013–14	469
2012–13	347 (shortened due to lockout)
2011–12	546
2010–11	645
2009–10	714
2008–09	734

By 2009–10, the number of fights in the NHL declined to 0.58 per game. A further decrease in the frequency of fighting happened over the next five seasons. The 2014–15 season had 0.32 fights per game, as teams placed a greater emphasis on skating ability and fewer young players became enforcers.

== Rules and penalties ==
Rules of the NHL, the North American junior leagues, and other North American professional minor leagues punish fighting with a five-minute major penalty. What separates these leagues from other major North American sports leagues is that they do not eject players simply for participating in a fight. However, fighting is frequently punishable by ejection in European leagues and in Olympic competition.

The rulebooks of the NHL and other professional leagues contain specific rules for fighting. These rules state that at the initiation of a fight, both players must definitely drop their sticks so as not to use them as a weapon. Players must also "drop" or shake off their protective gloves to fight bare-knuckled, as the hard leather and plastic of hockey gloves would increase the effect of landed blows. Players should not remove their own helmet before engaging in a fight due to risk of head injury or else both of the opposing players get an extra two penalty minutes. Players must also heed a referee warning to end a fight once the opponents have been separated. Failure to adhere to any of these rules results in an immediate game misconduct penalty and the possibility of fines and suspension from future games. In the NHL, when a player is fined, his lost pay goes towards the NHL emergency assistance fund. A fined coach's lost pay goes to the NHL Foundation.

=== North American professional leagues ===
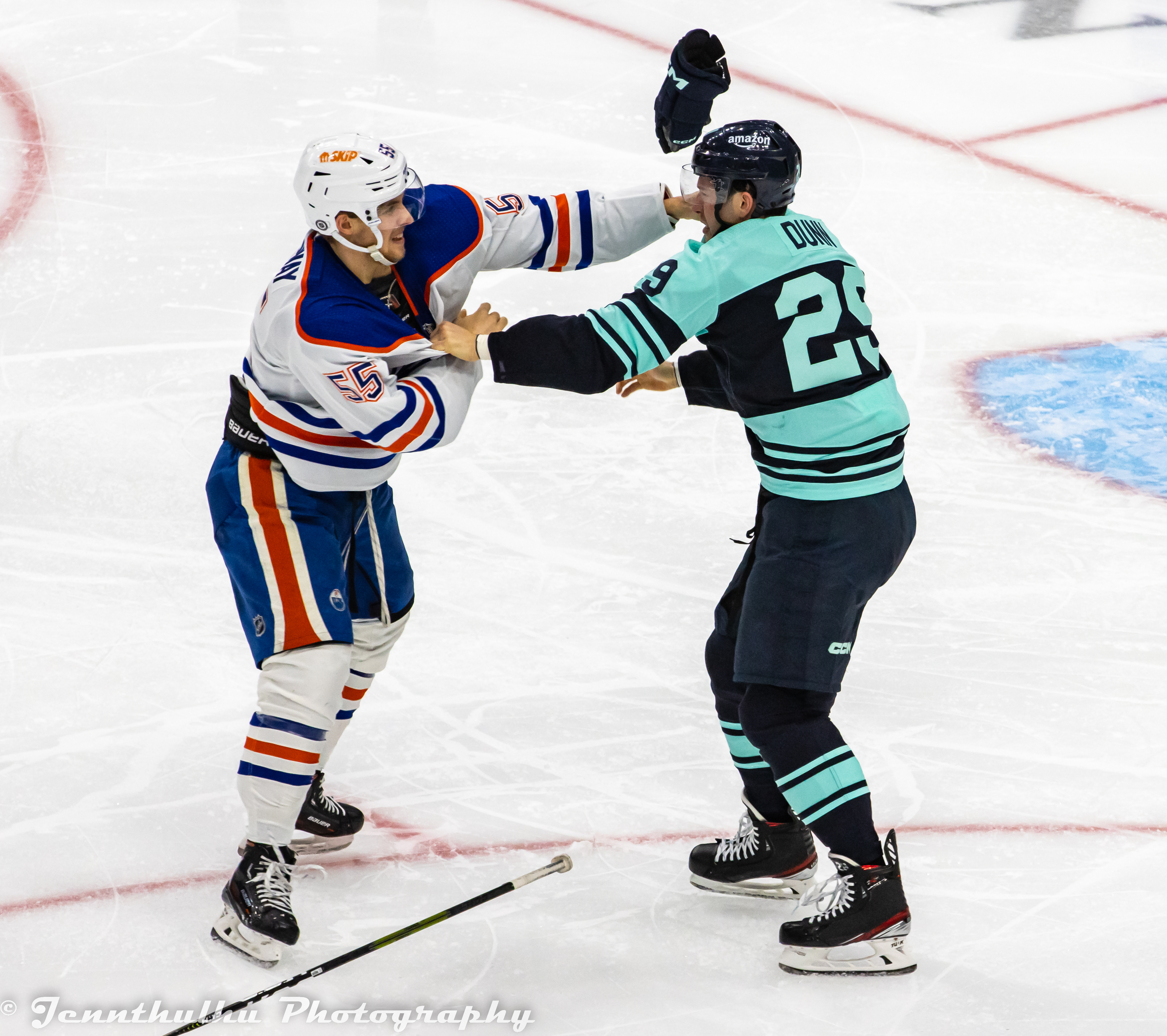
Dylan Holloway of the Edmonton Oilers fighting with Vince Dunn of the Seattle Kraken during an NHL game.

In the NHL, American Hockey League (AHL), ECHL, Southern Professional Hockey League, and other notable minor leagues, officials punish combatants with five-minute major penalties for fighting (hence the phrase "five for fighting"). A player is automatically ejected and suspended if the player tries to leave the bench to join a fight, or for using weapons of any kind (such as using a skate to kick an opponent, using a stick to hit an opponent, wrapping tape around one's hands, or spitting), as they can cause serious injury. A player who receives two instigator penalties or participates in three fights in a single game is also ejected automatically. Furthermore, his coach can be suspended up to ten games for allowing players to leave the bench to join a fight.

Video of fight between Zack Fitzgerald and Kelsey Wilson during the 2012 AHL Outdoor Classic

A player who commits three major penalties (including fighting) during a game is automatically ejected, suspended, and fined. A player ejected for three major penalties in a game, or for use of weapons, cannot be replaced for five minutes. In 2003, the ECHL added an ejection, fine, and suspension of an additional game for any player charged as an instigator of a fight during the final five minutes of the third period or any overtime. The NHL and AHL adopted the rule in 2005–06, and the NHL includes a fine against the ejected player's head coach. In 2014, the AHL added a major penalty counter. A player who commits ten major penalties for fighting is suspended one game, and will be suspended one game on each such penalty for his 11th to 13th, and two games for his 14th and further penalties. If the opposing fighter is also charged with an instigator penalty, the fighting major will not count towards suspension.

In 2023, the ECHL toughened the game misconduct penalty leading to ejection. The ejection penalty will now be assessed for two fighting majors in the same game, unless another player in the fight was assessed an instigator penalty. In addition, an automatic game misconduct penalty is assessed to offending fighters if a fight occurs before, during, or shortly after a face-off.

In the Professional Women's Hockey League (PWHL), a fight is deemed to have occurred when at least one player punches (or attempts to punch) an opposing player or when at least two players engage in a brawl. Players who leave the bench to participate in a fight are automatically fined, and fighters who receive three aggressor penalties in one regular season will be suspended from their next regular season game. In February 2025, and after a viral altercation in a game between the Boston Fleet and Ottawa Charge, in which both players were assessed double minor penalties for roughing, the PWHL published a statement to clarify the league's stance on fighting and to announce that combatants in future fights would now be "penalized with a five-minute major penalty and a game misconduct, with a possibility of further discipline following a review and taking into consideration repeat offenders."

=== Collegiate, European, and Olympic ===
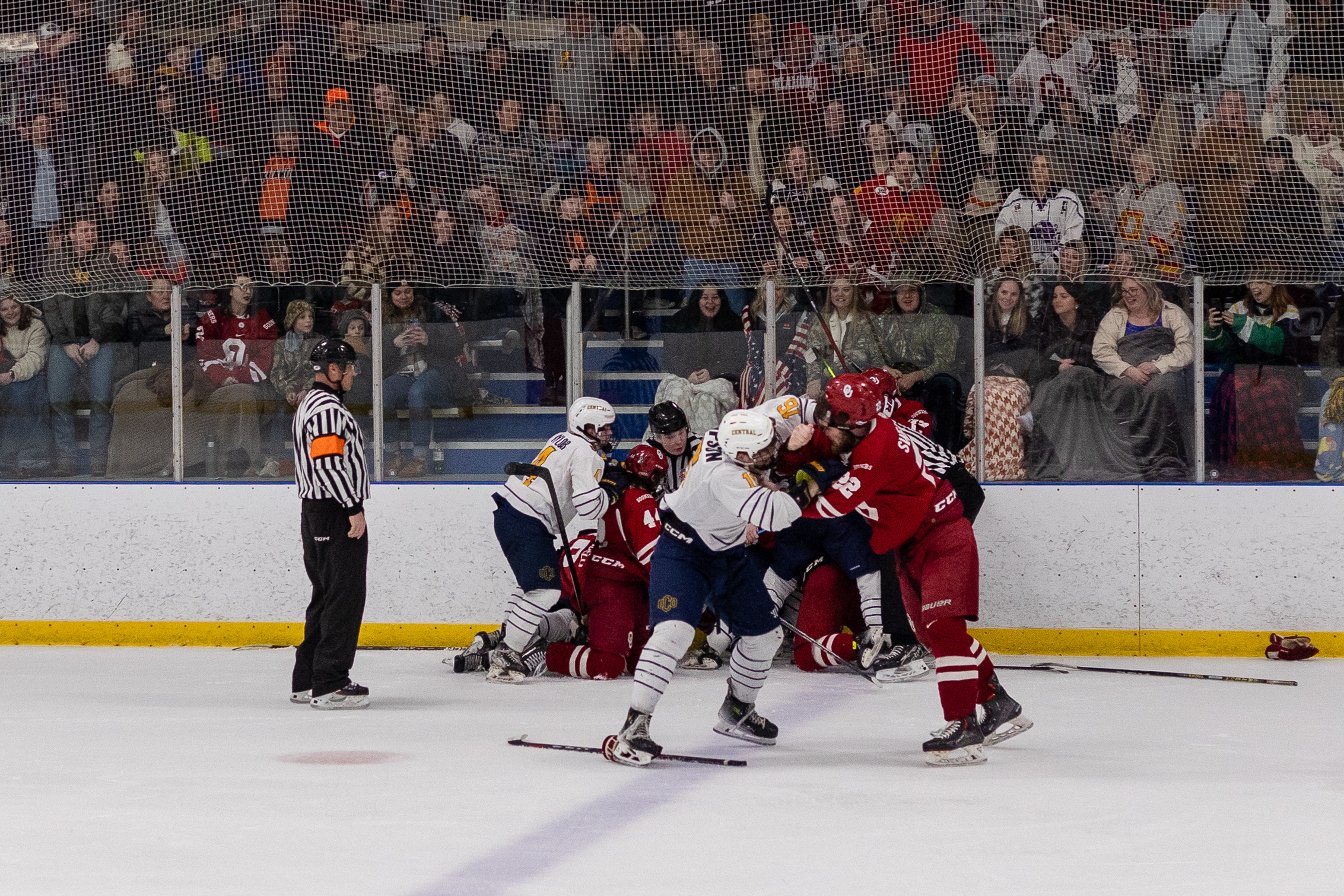
A brawl breaks out during an ACHA game

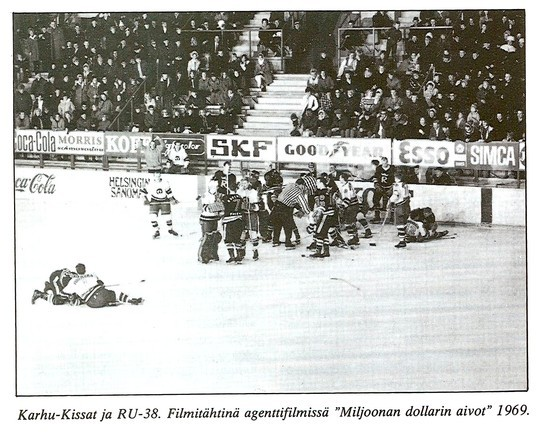
Finnish ice hockey clubs Karhu-Kissat and RU-38 performing an ice hockey fight for British espionage film Billion Dollar Brain.

In Division I and Division III National Collegiate Athletic Association (NCAA) hockey, the fighters are given a Game Disqualification, which is an ejection from the game and a suspension for as many games as the player has accrued Game Disqualifications during the course of a season. For example, if a player engages in a fight having already received a Game Disqualification earlier in the season, he is ejected from that game and suspended for his team's next two games. This automatic suspension has made fighting in college hockey relatively rare.

Fighting is strictly prohibited in European professional hockey leagues and in Olympic ice hockey. International Ice Hockey Federation's rule book specifies that fighting is "not a part of international hockey" and players who continue an altercation after being ordered by the referee to stop are given a major penalty and ejected from the game, as well as further penalties for offenses such as instigating a fight or attacking an unwilling opponent. Leagues that operate under IIHF rules may impose further disciplinary action; for example, the standard procedure in Liiga is to give 2-game suspensions to players who start fighting after agreeing upon it in advance as opposed to a natural escalation.

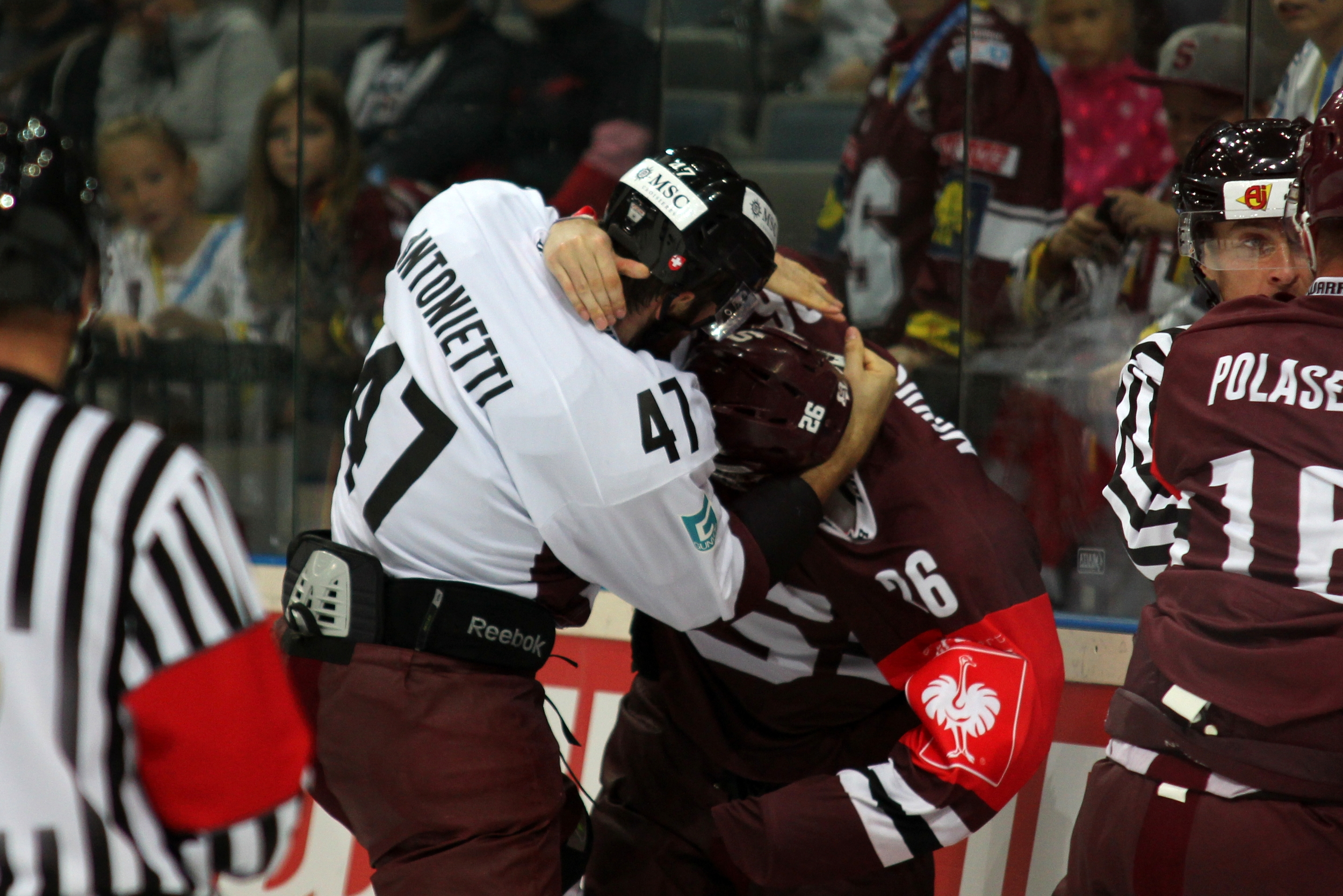
Juraj Mikuš of HC Sparta Praha fights with Eliot Antonietti from Genève-Servette HC during a CHL tournament

A notable exception is the Kontinental Hockey League, which only applies a 5-minute major penalty with no ejection, similar to the NHL. However, starting from the third major penalty for fighting in a season, the player is automatically assessed a 1-game suspension.

Despite the bans, there have been fights in European leagues. In 2001, a game between the Nottingham Panthers and the Sheffield Steelers in the British Superleague saw "some of the worst scenes of violence seen at a British ice hockey rink". When Sheffield enforcer Dennis Vial crosschecked Nottingham forward Greg Hadden, Panthers enforcer Barry Nieckar subsequently fought with Vial, which eventually escalated into a 36-man bench-clearing brawl. Referee Moray Hanson sent both teams to their locker rooms and delayed the game for 45 minutes while tempers cooled and the officials sorted out the penalties. Eight players and both coaches were ejected, and a British record total of 404 penalty minutes were incurred during the second period. The league handed out 30 games in suspensions to four players and Steelers' coach Mike Blaisdell and a total of £8,400 in fines. Russia's Kontinental Hockey League (KHL) had a bench-clearing brawl between Vityaz Chekhov and Avangard Omsk in 2010. Officials were forced to abandon the game as there were only four players left. Thirty-three players and both teams' coaches were ejected, and a world record total of 707 penalty minutes were incurred during the game. The KHL imposed fines totaling 5.7 million rubles ($191,000), suspended seven players, and counted the game as a 5–0 defeat for both teams, with no points being awarded.

The Punch-up in Piešťany was a notable instance of fighting in international play. A 1987 World Junior Ice Hockey Championships game between Canada and the Soviet Union was the scene of a bench-clearing brawl that lasted 20 minutes and prompted officials to turn off the arena lights in an attempt to stop it, forcing the IIHF to declare the game null and void. The fighting was particularly dangerous as fighting was a surprise and a custom unknown to the Soviet players, some of whom escalated the fighting beyond what was considered acceptable in North America. Both teams were ejected from the tournament, costing Canada an assured medal, and the Soviet team was barred from the end-of-tournament dinner.

== Enforcers ==
The role of "enforcer" on a hockey team is unofficial. Enforcers occasionally play regular shifts like other players, but their primary role is deterring opposing players from rough play. Coaches often send enforcers out when opposing enforcers are on the ice or any time when it is necessary to check excessively physical play by the opposing team. Enforcers, particularly those with questionable playing skills, can be colloquially referred to as goons (a term also occasionally used for a related position, the pest, who may not fight but will agitate an opponent with rough play and goad the opponent into a fight).

== Causes ==
There are many reasons for fights during a hockey game. Some reasons are related to gameplay, such as retaliation, momentum-building, intimidation, deterrence, attempting to draw "reaction penalties", and protecting star players. There are also some personal reasons, such as political tensions, retribution for past incidents, bad blood between players, and simple job security for enforcers. Fights often start in response to an opponent's rough play. A North American study of 1975–1983 (the period of peak fighting) found that players used fist-fights to either "stick up for oneself" and save face from attempts at intimidation, or to act in self-defence from actual or perceived dirty tricks.

Most fights per NHL season
Season	Player	Number of fights	Reference
2015–16	Cody McLeod	12	
2014–15	Cody McLeod	19	
2013–14	Tom Sestito	19	
2012–13	B. J. Crombeen; Colton Orr	13	
2011–12	Brandon Prust; Shawn Thornton	20	
2010–11	George Parros	27	
2009–10	Zenon Konopka	33	
2008–09	Zack Stortini	25	

=== Game-related reasons ===
Of the many reasons for fighting, the foremost is retaliation. When players engage in play that members of the opposing team consider unscrupulous, a fight can ensue. The fight may be between the assailant and the victim, between the assailant and an enforcer from the victim's team, or between opposing enforcers. Fights that occur for retaliation purposes can be in immediate response to an on-ice incident, to incidents from earlier in the game, or to actions from past games. Enforcers who intend to start a fight have to consider their timing due to the Instigator rule. For example, putting the opposing team on a power play due to penalties incurred from fighting is less advisable when the game is close.

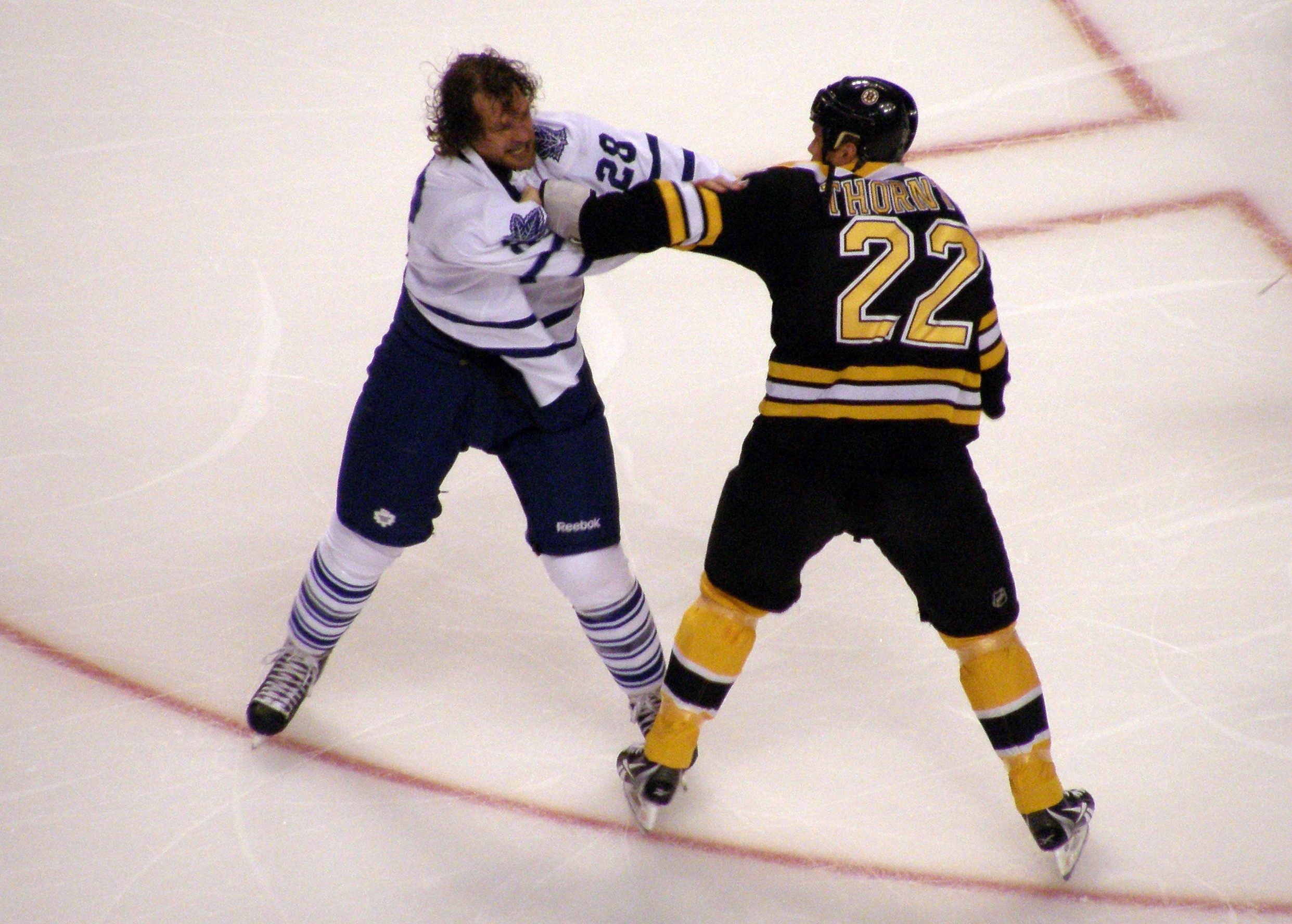
Toronto Maple Leafs' Colton Orr fighting with Boston Bruins' Shawn Thornton in October 2011. Both players were enforcers for their teams.

Enforcers sometimes start fights to build game momentum and provide a psychological advantage over the opposing team. These fights usually involve two enforcers, but may involve any player who is agitating the opposition. This type of fight raises morale on the team of the player who wins, and often excites the home crowd. For that reason, it can also be a gamble to start a fight for momentum; if an enforcer loses the fight, the momentum can swing the wrong way.

Intimidation is an important element of a hockey game and some enforcers start fights just to intimidate opposing players in hopes that they will refrain from agitating skilled players. For example, in the late 1950s, Gordie Howe helped establish himself as an enforcer by defeating Lou Fontinato, a notable tough guy who tallied over 1,200 penalty minutes in his career. Fontinato suffered a broken nose from the fight. After that incident, Howe got a lot more space on the ice and was able to score many goals over the span of his career because he intimidated other players. Conversely, games in European professional leagues are known to be less violent than North American games because fighting is discouraged in Europe by ejection and heavy fines. Since the penalties for fighting are so severe, the enforcers are less able to intimidate opposing players with fighting and said players take more liberties on the ice.

For teams that face each other frequently, players may fight just to send the message to the opposing players that they will be the target of agitation or aggression in future games. Teams that are losing by a considerable margin often start these fights near the end of the game when they have nothing to lose. Enforcers may start fights with more skilled players to draw what is called a "reaction penalty", an undisciplined reaction to aggressive play on the part of the enforcer. This practice is also known to be difficult due to the Instigator rule.

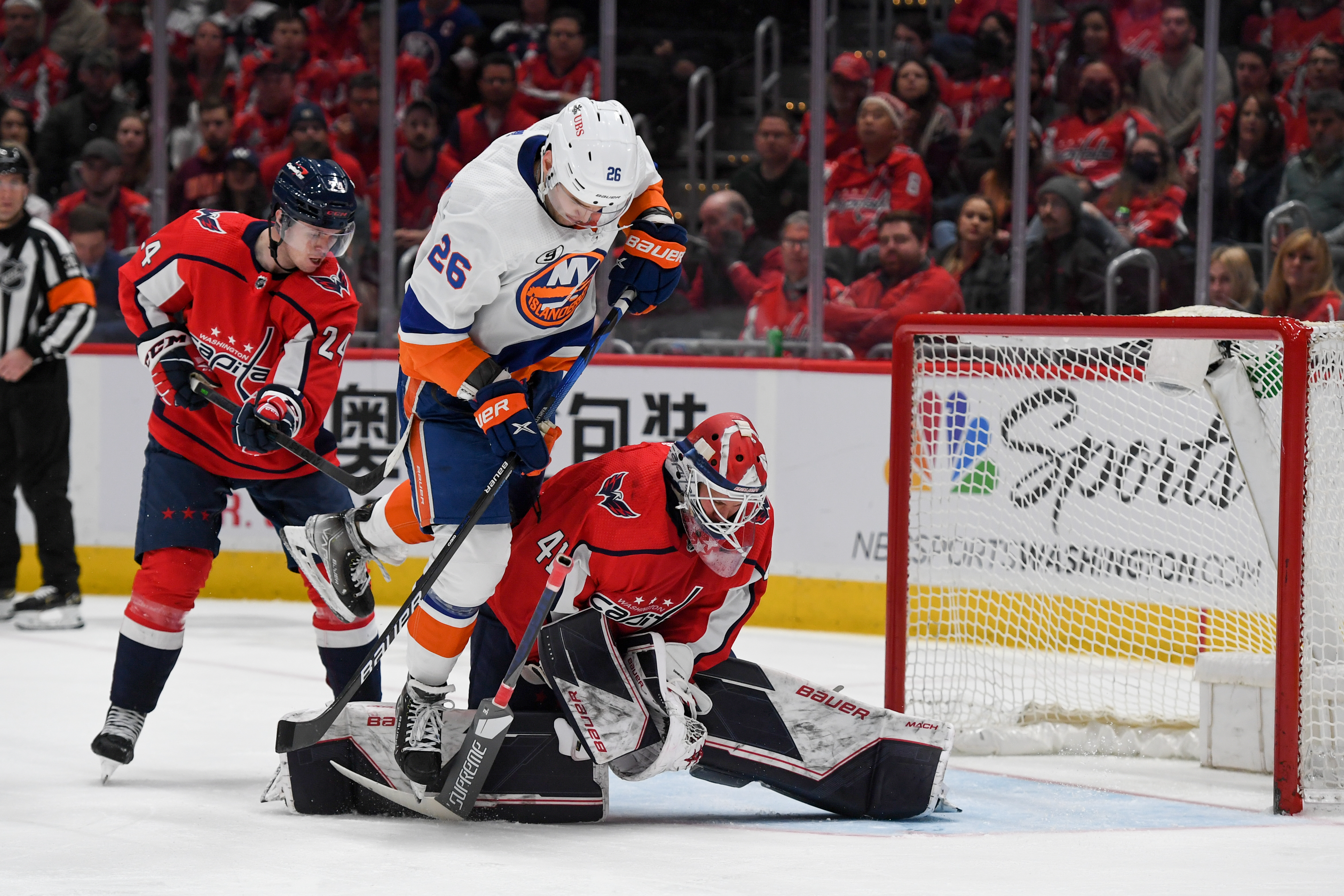
New York Islanders forward Oliver Wahlstrom jostle for position in front of the net against Washington Capitals' goalie Vítek Vaněček. Fights may occur to protect "defenceless" goalies.

Another reason is the protection of star skaters and defenceless goalies. Fighting within the game can also send a message to players and coaches from other teams that cheap shots, dirty plays, and targeting specific players will not be tolerated and there will be consequences involved. Fighting can provide retribution for a team's player getting targeted or injured. Overall, fighting is sometimes seen as a beneficial policing that the game needs to keep players in line. Over the history of hockey, many enforcers have been signed simply to protect players like Wayne Gretzky, who was protected by Dave Semenko, Marty McSorley, and others, and Brett Hull, who was protected by Kelly Chase and others. Many believe that without players protecting each other, referees would affect the gameplay by having to call more penalties, and the league would have to suspend players for longer periods.

=== Personal reasons ===
Many young enforcers need to establish their role early in their career to avoid losing their jobs. Due to the farm systems that most professional hockey leagues use, enforcers who get a chance to play at the level above their current one (for example, an AHL player getting a chance to play in an NHL game) need to show other players, coaches, and fans that they are worthy of the enforcer role on the team. There are also times when players and even entire teams carry on personal rivalries that have little to do with individual games; fights frequently occur for no other reason. A rivalry that produced many fights was between the Detroit Red Wings and the Colorado Avalanche during the 1990s.

== Effect on game ==
Statistical evidence indicates that fighting correlates negatively with a given team's success, or at least seems to have inconsequential benefits. Since the 1979–80 season, teams in the bottom three of fighting-related major penalties have finished at the top of the regular-season standings 10 times and have won the Stanley Cup 11 times, while teams in the top three have won the regular season and Stanley Cup only twice each. One statistical analysis calculated that winning a fight benefited a team by about 1/80 of a win in the standings. Two others showed that fights increase scoring, but do so evenly for both teams so do not significantly affect wins.

== Efforts to ban fighting ==
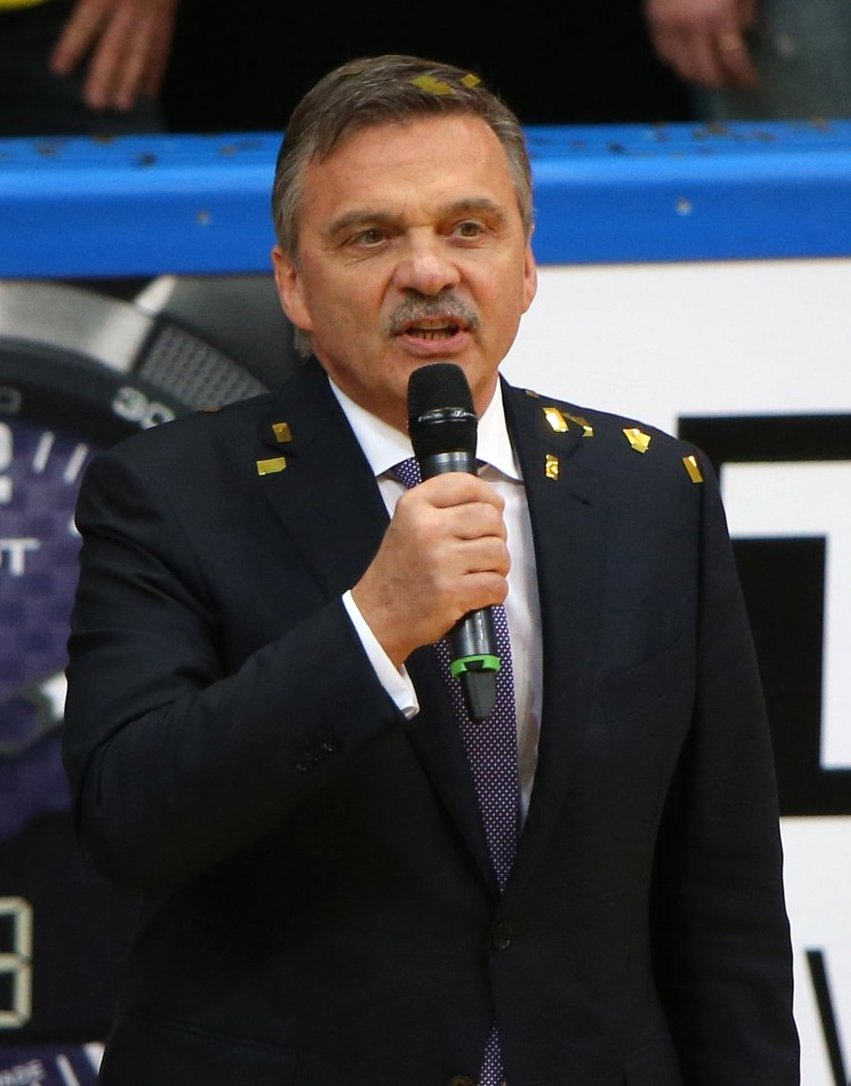
René Fasel, the former president of the International Ice Hockey Federation, has spoken out against fighting in the sport

The Canadian Academy of Sport Medicine announced in Position Statement in 1988 that "Fighting does cause injuries, which range from fractures of the hands and face to lacerations and eye injuries. At present, it is an endemic and ritualized blot on the reputation of the North American game."

Criticism often arises after single acts of violence committed during fights. For example, on March 21, 2007, Colton Orr of the New York Rangers fought with Todd Fedoruk of the Philadelphia Flyers and ended up knocking Fedoruk unconscious. Fedoruk already had titanium plates in his face from a fight earlier in the season with Derek Boogaard. The resulting media coverage of the incident renewed calls for a fighting ban. Some players believe that there is no harm in discussing the issue; however, most players and administrators continue to believe that fighting should stay as a permanent element of organized ice hockey. Some league administrators, such as former NHL senior vice-president and director of hockey operations Colin Campbell, have been circulating the idea of banning fighting in response to incidents such as the Fedoruk–Orr fight.

Some sports journalists have articulated the idea with increasing frequency that fighting adds nothing to the sport and should be banned. Among the reasons they cite are that it is unsportsmanlike, is a "knee-jerk" reaction that detracts from the skillful aspects of the game, and that it is a waste of time. The Journal of Sport and Social Issues' Ryan T. Lewinson and Oscar E. Palma believe that fighting shows a lack of discipline on the part of participants, as well as a lack of fairness in certain cases, including when fighters have a size disparity. However, supporters of fighting say it provides a means of security for players, that fighting is a tool players use to keep opposing players in check; essentially allowing players to police which hits and dirty plays are unacceptable.

Various politicians and hockey figures have expressed opposition to fighting. In 2012, David Johnston, the Governor General of Canada, said that fighting should not be part of the sport. IIHF president René Fasel has protested against fighting, deeming it "Neanderthal behavior". Wayne Gretzky, considered by many to be the greatest hockey player of all time, has often spoken out against fighting.

NHL Commissioner Gary Bettman, at a 2007 press conference broadcast on CBC Sports, said, "Fighting has always had a role in the game ... from a player safety standpoint, what happens in fighting is something we need to look at just as we need to look at hits to the head. But we're not looking to have a debate on whether fighting is good or bad or should be part of the game."

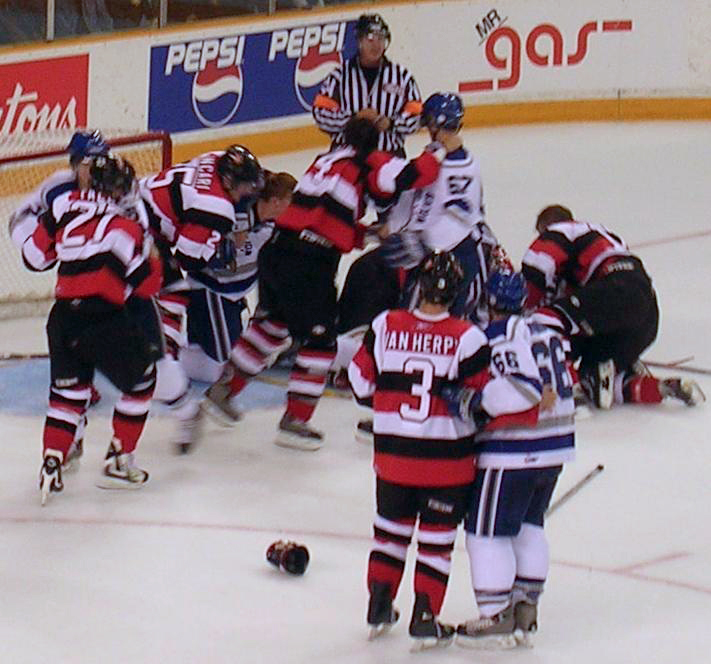
A large fight during a Major Junior Ontario Hockey League game between the Sudbury Wolves and Ottawa 67's.

Community members often become involved in the debate over banning fighting. In December 2006, a school board trustee in London, Ontario, attended a London Knights game and was shocked by the fighting and by the crowd's positive reaction to it. This experience led him to organize an ongoing effort to ban fighting in the Ontario Hockey League, where the Knights compete, by attempting to gain the support of other school boards and by writing letters to OHL administrators. On the advice of its Medical Health Officer, the Middlesex-London Health board has supported recommendations to ban fighting across amateur hockey and to increase disciplinary measures to ensure deterrence.

The first known death directly related to a hockey fight occurred when Don Sanderson of the Whitby Dunlops, a top-tier senior amateur team in Ontario's Major League Hockey, died in January 2009, a month after sustaining a head injury during a fight: Sanderson's helmet came off during the fight, and when he fell to the ice, he hit his head. His death renewed calls to ban fighting among critics. In reaction, the league has stated that they are reviewing the players' use of helmets.

Fighters such as Bob Probert and Boogaard have been posthumously diagnosed with chronic traumatic encephalopathy, a degenerative disease of the brain caused by repeated brain trauma. While the NHL took steps to limit head trauma from blindslide hits, it was criticized for doing nothing to reduce fighting, which consists of repeated deliberate blows to the head. It is unknown whether Boogaard's death was mainly attributed from his repeated head trauma from fighting and hits or from a possible addiction to painkillers while simultaneously abusing alcohol. His brain has been sent to Boston University for further testing.

=== Rules in-game to discourage fighting ===
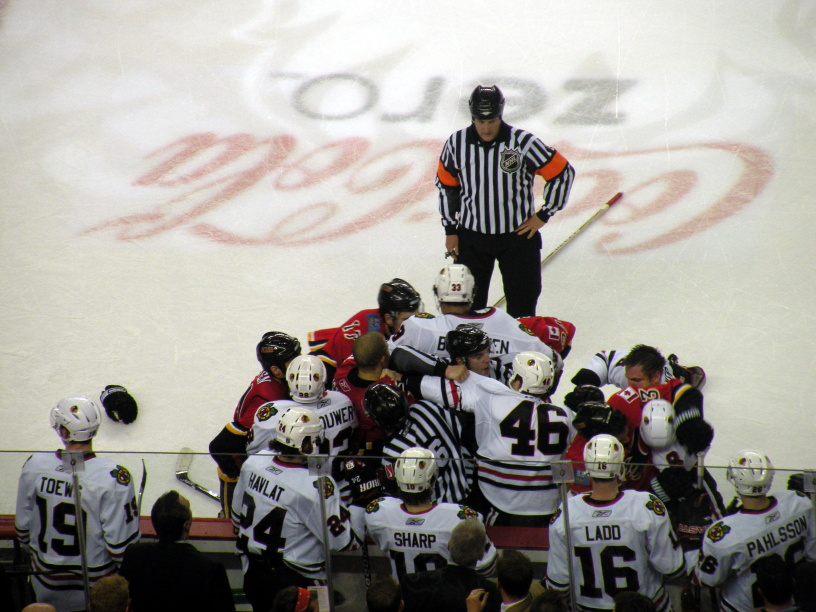
A scrum between the Calgary Flames and Chicago Blackhawks in front of the latter's bench. NHL rules were introduced to prevent bench-clearing brawls from occurring.

Since the 1970s, three rules have curtailed the number and scope of fights in the NHL. In 1971, the league created the "Third Man In" rule which attempts to eliminate the bench-clearing brawl by providing for the ejection of the first player who joins a fight already in progress, unless a match penalty is being assessed to a player already engaged in that fight. Another rule automatically suspends the first player from each team that leaves the bench to join a fight when it is not their shift. In 1992, the "Instigator" rule, which adds an additional two-minute minor penalty to the player who starts a fight, was introduced.

Beginning in the 2016–17 season, the American Hockey League imposed a fighting major counter, similar to the National Basketball Association's unsportsmanlike technical foul counter and soccer's accumulated cards. A player who collects ten major penalties for fighting during the season will be suspended one game, and will be suspended one game for each fighting major for the next three penalties (the 11th, 12th, and 13th fighting majors). A player is suspended two games for his 14th and subsequent major penalty for fighting. If one player involved in the fight is charged with an instigator penalty, the opponent will not have the fighting major count towards suspension. The ECHL added the rule in 2019–20.

Beginning in the 2023–24 season, the ECHL reduced the number of fighting majors that can result in an ejection from three to two, with exceptions for opponents being docked as instigators, and added automatic game misconduct penalties for fights that occur just before or after the puck is dropped.

== Etiquette ==
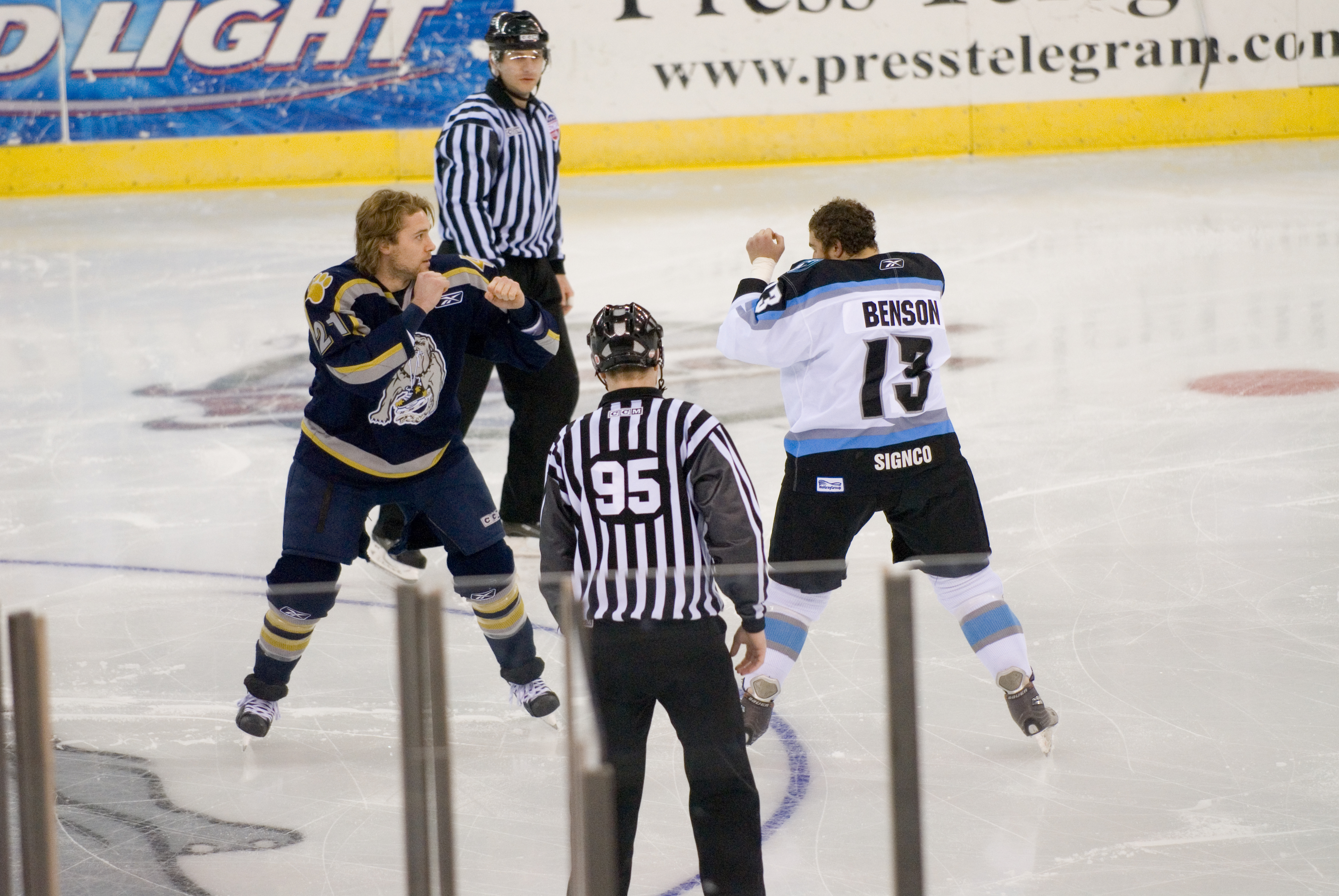
Two skaters preparing to fight. Etiquette requires opposing fighters to agree to the fight.

There are several informal rules governing fighting in ice hockey that players rarely discuss but take quite seriously. The most important aspect of this etiquette is that opposing enforcers must agree to a fight, usually via a verbal or physical exchange on the ice. This agreement helps both players avoid being given an instigator penalty, and helps keep unwilling participants out of fights.

Enforcers typically only fight each other, with only the occasional spontaneous fight breaking out between one or two opponents who do not usually fight. There is a high degree of respect among enforcers as well; they will respect a rival who declines a fight because he is playing with injuries, a frequent occurrence, because enforcers consider winning a fight with an injured opponent to be an empty victory. This is also known as granting a "free pass". Enforcer Darren McCarty described fighters as being divided into "heavyweights" and "light heavyweights", and said that players in the latter category "end up dancing with some guys who could end (their) career with a single punch."

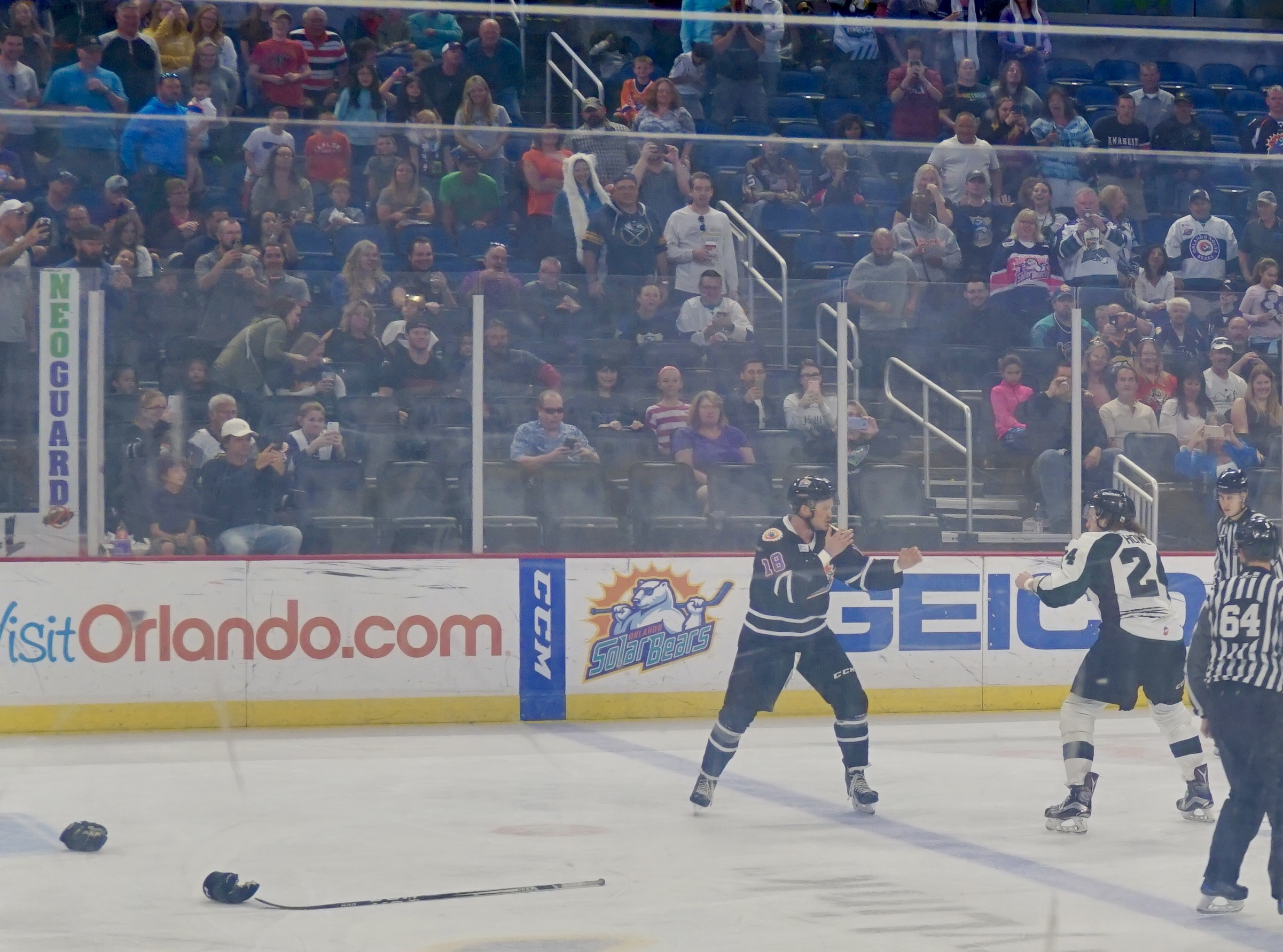
A fight at the Kia Center during an ECHL game between Orlando and (Fort Myers) Florida. The gloves of one of the fighters lie on the ice, having been removed prior to engaging in a fight.

Long-standing rivalries result in numerous rematches, especially if one of the enforcers has to decline an invitation to fight during a given game. This is one of the reasons that enforcers may fight at the beginning of a game, when nothing obvious has happened to agitate the opponents. On the other hand, it is bad etiquette to try to initiate a fight with an enforcer who is near the end of his shift, since the more rested player will have an obvious advantage.

Another important aspect of etiquette is simply fighting fairly and cleanly. Fairness is maintained by not wearing equipment that could injure the opposing fighter, such as face shields, gloves, or masks, and not assaulting referees or linesmen. Finally, whatever the outcome of the fight, etiquette dictates that players who choose to fight win and lose those fights gracefully. Otherwise, they risk losing the respect of their teammates and fans.

Sportsmanship is also an important aspect when it comes to fights. While an enforcer may start a fight in response to foul play, it is generally not acceptable to start a fight to retaliate against an opponent who scored fairly.

== Tactics ==
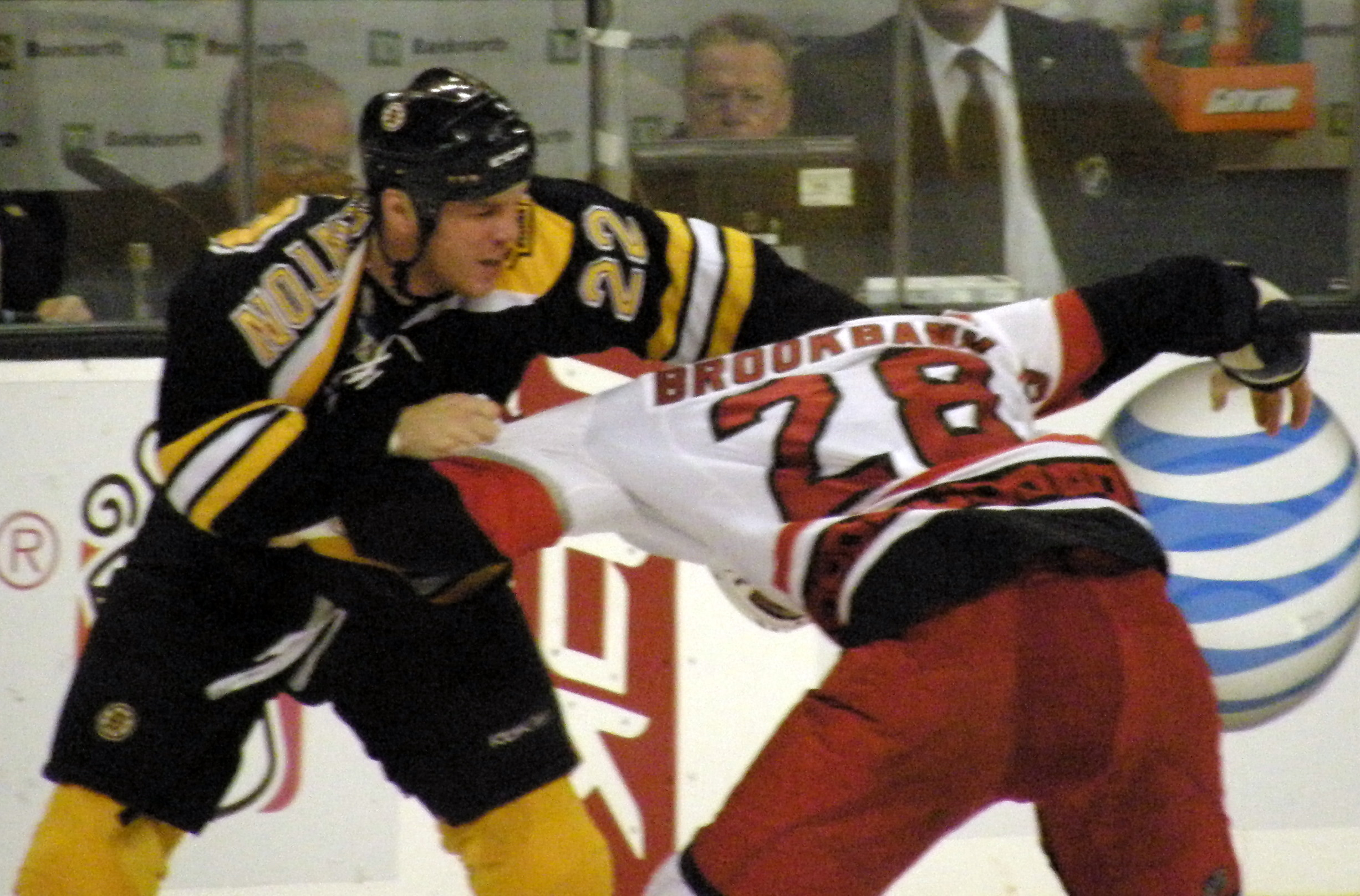
Wade Brookbank with his head down as he fights Shawn Thornton

Fighting tactics are governed by several actual rules, and enforcers will also adopt informal tactics particular to their style and personality. One tactic adopted by players is known as "going for it", in which the player puts his head down and just throws as many punches as he can, as fast as he can. In the process, that player takes as many punches as he delivers, although some of them are to the hard forehead. Fighters usually must keep one hand on their opponent's jersey since the ice surface makes maintaining balance very difficult. For this reason, the majority of a hockey fight consists of the players holding on with one hand and punching with the other.

Other examples include Gordie Howe's tactic of holding the sweater of his opponent right around the armpit of his preferred punching arm so as to impede his movement. Probert, of the Detroit Red Wings and Chicago Blackhawks, was known to allow his opponents to punch until they showed signs of tiring, at which time he would take over and usually dominate the fight. Some consider long-time Buffalo Sabres enforcer Rob Ray to be the reason that hockey jerseys are now equipped with tie-down straps ("fight straps") that prevent their removal; he would always remove his jersey during fights so his opponents would have nothing to grab on to. This is commonly referred to as the "Rob Ray Rule".

== Officials' role ==
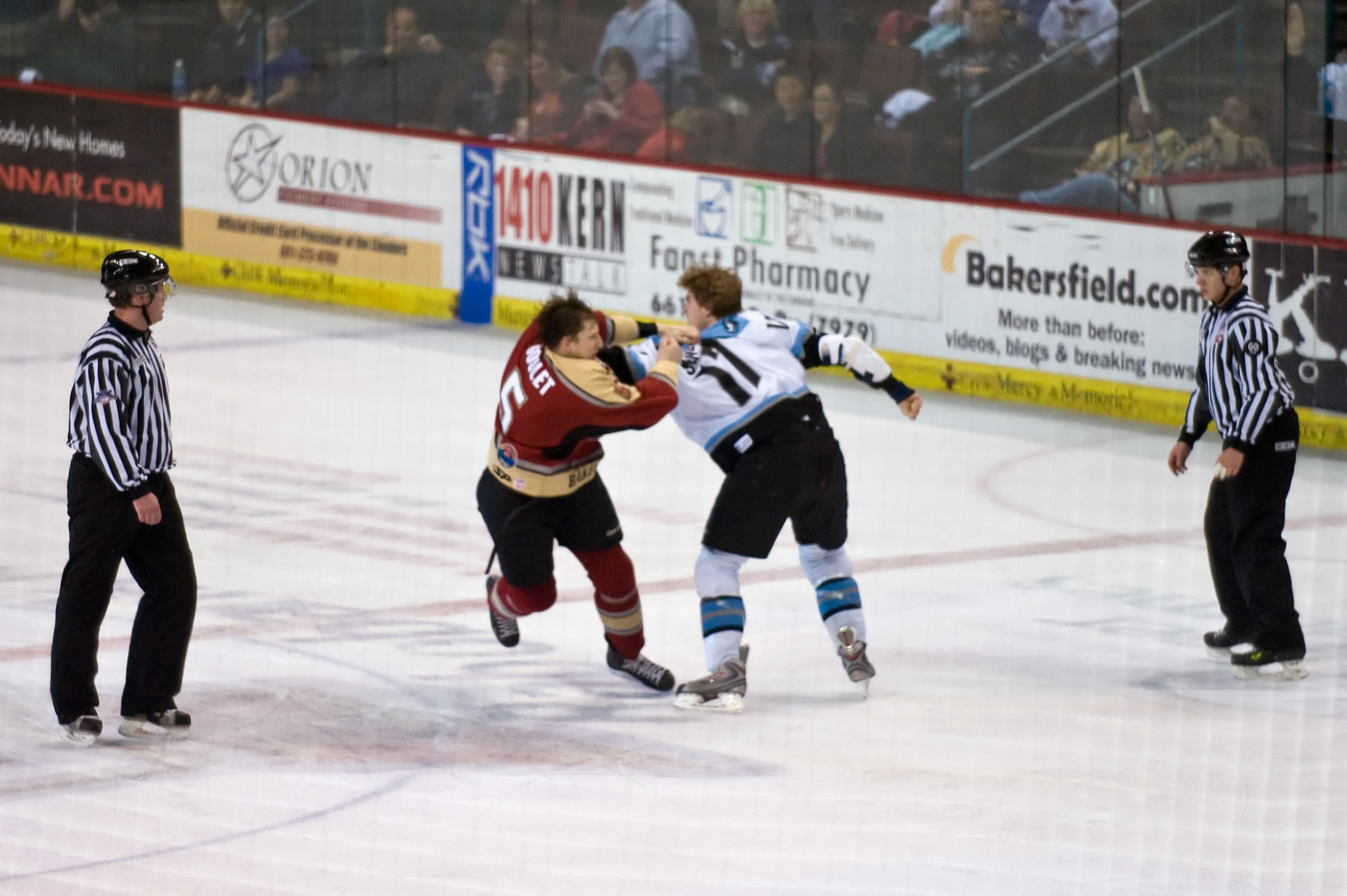
Two skaters fight as two linesmen watch on

Throughout a game, the referee and linesmen have a role in preventing fights through the way they are managing the game—calling penalties, breaking up scuffles before they escalate, etc. Despite an official's best efforts, though, fights do occur and once they do, the referee and linesmen have a certain set of responsibilities to follow in order to safely break up the fight. None of these responsibilities are written in the NHL's rule book, but often are guided by "common sense", according to officials.

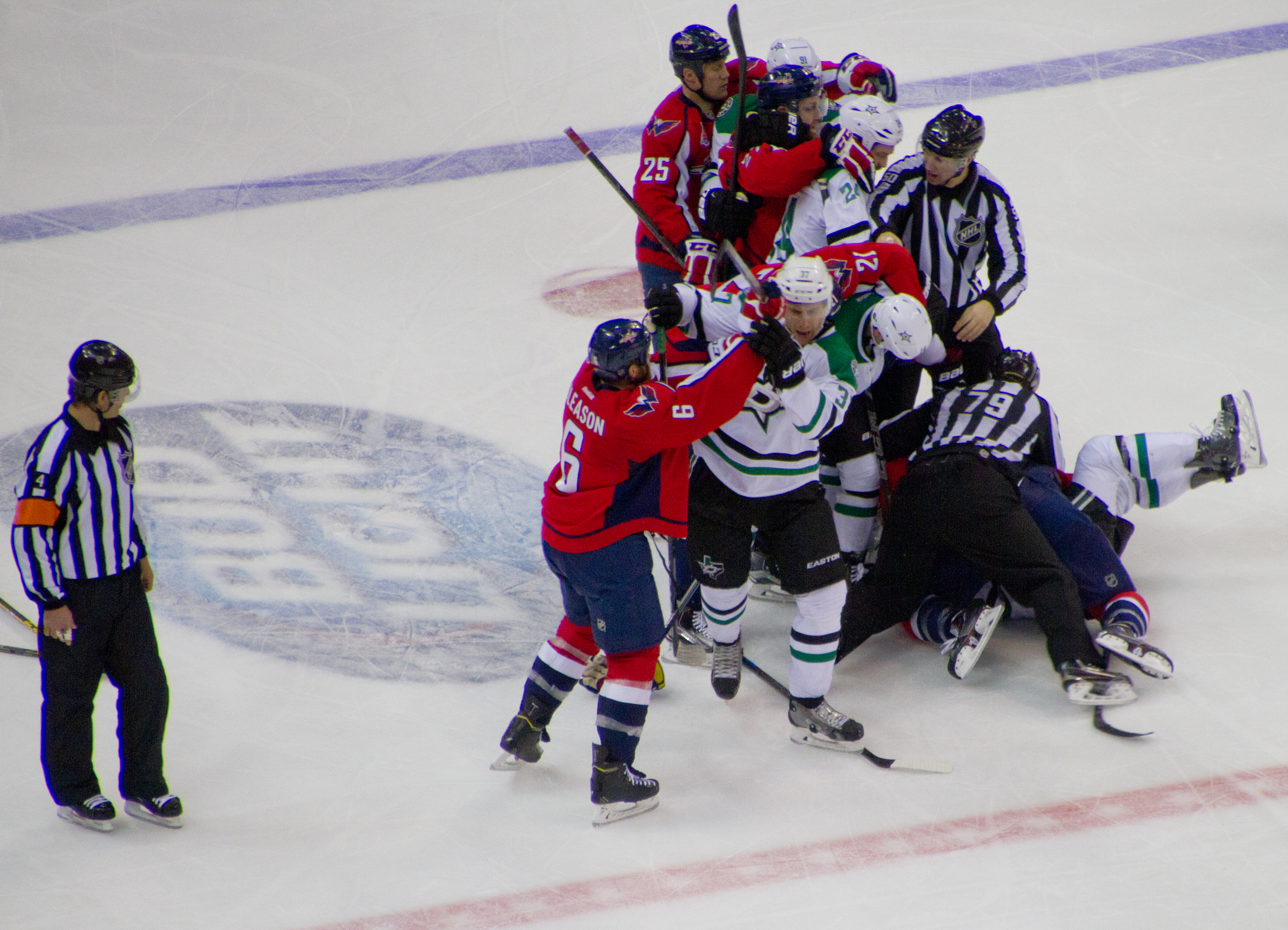
A linesman uses his body to shield a skater on the ground, while another attempts to break up the scrum. The referee on the side is taking note of the fight and watching for additional penalties.

In a single fight situation, the linesmen will communicate with each other as to which player they will take during the fight, clear out any sticks, gloves, or other equipment that has been dropped and wait for a safe time to enter the fight, which they will do together. If both players are still standing while the linesmen enter, the linesmen will approach from each side (never from behind), bring their arms over the combatants' arms and wrap them around, pushing downwards and breaking the players apart. If the players have fallen, the linesmen will approach from the side (never over the skates), getting in between the two players. One linesman will use his body to shield the player on the bottom from the other player while his partner will remove the top player from the fight. Most linesmen will allow a fight to run its course for their own safety, but will enter a fight regardless if one player has gained a significant advantage over his opponent. Once the players have been broken up, the linesmen then escort the players off the ice. During this time the referee will keep other players from entering the fight by sending them to a neutral area on the ice and then watching the fight and assessing any other penalties that occur.

In a multiple-fight situation, the linesmen will normally break up fights together, one fight at a time using the same procedures for a single fight. The linesmen will communicate with each other which fight to break up. In a multiple-fight situation, the referee will stand in an area of the ice where he/she can have a full view of all the players and will write down—on a pad of paper commonly known as a "riot pad"—the numbers of the players that are involved in the fights, watching for situations that warrant additional penalties, such as players removing opponents' helmets, players participating in a second fight, players leaving a bench to participate in a fight, or third players into a fight. The referee will not normally break up a fight unless the linesmen need assistance, or a fight is occurring where a player has gained a significant advantage over the other player, leading to concerns of significant injury.

== See also ==
- Gordie Howe hat trick
