= Superfluous =

Superfluous means unnecessary or excessive. It may also refer to:

- Superfluous precision, the use of calculated measurements beyond significant figures
- The Diary of a Superfluous Man, an 1850 novella by Russian author Ivan Turgenev
- Superfluous man, a Russian archetype inspired by the above novella

== See also ==
- Third wheel (disambiguation)
- Fifth wheel (disambiguation)
