= Fifth wheel (disambiguation) =

A fifth wheel is a coupling that provides a link between the trailer and a truck (or a tractor unit).

Fifth wheel may also refer to:

- Fifth-wheel trailer, a type of travel trailer that is a variant of the tractor-trailer version
- Fifth wheel (Brooks Walker), an invention designed to aid parking cars
- Fifth Wheel Truck Stops, a truck stop chain across Southern Ontario, Canada
- The 5th Wheel, an American reality dating show
- The Fifth Wheel (2013 film), an Italian comedy-drama film
- The Fifth Wheel (upcoming film), an American comedy film
- "Fifth Wheel", a song by Avail from their 1998 album Over the James
- "Fifth wheel", a phrase used in the United Kingdom meaning someone who is unwanted and unimportant in a situation.
- The Fifth Wheel (TV program), Russian journalistic TV channel from perstroika times, best known for the hoax "Lenin was a mushroom"
