= High-Ballin' =

1978 film by Peter Carter

- 1978 film poster
- Directed by: Peter Carter
- Written by: Richard Robinson; Stephen Schneck
- Screenplay by: Paul F. Edwards
- Produced by: Jon Slan
- Starring: Peter Fonda; Jerry Reed; Helen Shaver; Chris Wiggins
- Cinematography: René Verzier
- Edited by: Eric Wrate
- Music by: Paul Hoffert
- Production company: The Pando Company
- Distributed by: Ambassador Films (Canada); American International Pictures (US)
- Release dates: May 26, 1978 (Toronto); August 30, 1978 (Los Angeles)
- Running time: 97 minutes
- Countries: Canada; United States
- Language: English
- Budget: $2 million
- Box office: $4 million

High-Ballin is a 1978 Canadian-American action drama film about truckers directed by Peter Carter. The US release was rated PG, with a runtime of 97 minutes.

The film primarily depicts a confrontation between a trucker boss and independent truckers. The boss uses a criminal gang to intimidate his rivals, but he is eventually double-crossed by the gang leader. The film has been viewed as a contemporary Western, transferring Old West themes into a contemporary setting.

== Plot ==
Jerry Reed plays the "Iron Duke", an independent trucker who stands up to the local trucker boss, King Carroll, who tries to drive independent truckers out of business through intimidation tactics by a gang led by his partner Harvey. Duke's friend Rane, played by Peter Fonda, comes to visit his friend and ends up helping him. Rane and "Pickup" (seemingly the only female truck driver, played by Helen Shaver) suggest hauling a load of illegal liquor to a lumber camp, in order to become secure enough to resist King and Harvey's pressure, and thus inspiring other independents to resist as well.

Duke is shot, and Rane organizes the other truckers to confront King and Harvey. Pickup is kidnapped by Harvey. Back at King's headquarters, Harvey knocks Pickup unconscious, shooting King when he protests. As the truckers arrive and fight King's men, Harvey puts Pickup in his car and drives away. Rane sees Harvey and gives chase. When Harvey stops, he and Rane confront each other in a fight. Both men draw their weapons and Rane shoots Harvey, then embraces Pickup. At the end of the film, Rane drives away in Pickup's truck.

The film was described as "a modern day western, with trucks instead of horses." Another observer said it could be summarized as "Pow, crash, screw, fight, collide, punch, slam, crash, screw."

While set ostensibly in the United States, the CN Tower appears in the background during the film's climax, and all vehicles carry Ontario plates.

== Cast ==
- Peter Fonda as Rane
- Jerry Reed as "Iron Duke" Boykin
- Helen Shaver as "Pickup"
- Chris Wiggins as "King" Carroll
- David Ferry as Harvey
- Harvey Atkin as "Buzz"
- Michael Hogan as Reggie
- Michael Ironside as Butch

Myrna Lorrie and Prairie Oyster also perform musical scenes in the film.

== Production ==
The film was Jon Slan's first large-budget venture. During production, the working title was P.F. Flyer, but High-Ballin' was adopted during the course of filming. Its shooting schedule was 10 weeks, between October and December 1977.

The film was filmed in and around Milton, Ontario, the Toronto waterfront and rural roads north of Toronto (in the Kleinburg and Vaughan areas), with notable scenes shot at the Fifth Wheel in Milton and a small farmhouse near Kleinburg. In special effects, it featured a "flaming cannon roll" which had not previously been attempted in a motion picture.

== Release and reception ==
High-Ballin' was released in Toronto on May 26, 1978, but it was not seen in Los Angeles until August 30. Its television release was on November 28, 1978, when it was seen on CBS.

The Independent Film Journal noted that "although High-Ballin' is no great shakes in terms of original storytelling, director Peter Carter provides a good deal more polish and flash than one might expect of the raucous road genre." In The Toronto Star, Clyde Gilmour said, "This is a popcorn movie, intended to be half-watched while your mind is toying with other matters." The Motion Picture Product Digest characterized it as an exploitation film, describing it as "[existing] not to provide any kind of realistic picture of the trucking industry today but to exploit it for a standard action movie with lots of violence."

The Globe and Mail characterized the film thus:

As much money seems to have been spent on stuntmen as actors. Cars screech, do wheelies, fly off a large hauler, turn somersaults, burst into flames, and generally do everything but tapdance on their reckless way to oblivion, sometimes on lonely Weston Road or in front of the Harbour Castle Hotel.

It has also been released under the title Death Toll and was made available in video format in 1989.
