= Aaron Boogaard =

Canadian ice hockey player (born 1986)

- Born: August 11, 1986 (age 39) Regina, Saskatchewan, Canada
- Height: 6 ft 3 in (191 cm)
- Weight: 215 lb (98 kg; 15 st 5 lb)
- Position: Right wing
- Shot: Right
- Played for: WBS Penguins
- NHL draft: 175th overall, 2004; Minnesota Wild
- Playing career: 2007–2017

Aaron Boogaard (born August 11, 1986) is a former professional ice hockey player who most recently played for the Wichita Thunder of the ECHL.

== Playing career ==
Boogaard was drafted 175th overall by the Minnesota Wild in the 2004 NHL entry draft. He signed a three-year entry-level contract with the Pittsburgh Penguins on April 23, 2007. He spent the majority of the 2007–08 season with the Wheeling Nailers, the Penguins' ECHL affiliate, appearing in only two games with Wilkes-Barre/Scranton. Boogaard appeared in 41 games for Wilkes-Barre/Scranton during the following season.

After being cleared of his charges connected to the death of his brother, Boogaard was offered a chance to continue his professional hockey career by receiving a training camp invite to the Houston Aeros, the AHL affiliate of the Minnesota Wild. Aeros General Manager Jim Mill has mentioned that Boogaard may be signed to a two-way contract between the Aeros and a team in the ECHL or Central Hockey League.

== Legal troubles ==
On July 20, 2011, Boogaard was arrested on suspicion of prescription fraud/possession of prescription pills. He was charged with the unlawful distribution of a controlled substance, oxycodone, and with interfering with a crime scene for misleading the coroner or concealing evidence in the death of his brother, Derek Boogaard.

On October 6, 2011, Hennepin County District Judge William Howard said the facts of the case didn't support the charge, being that Aaron did not buy the pills, and dismissed the felony charge of unlawful distribution of a controlled substance against Boogaard. Boogaard would later plea guilty to interfering with the scene of a death. As a result of Boogaard's guilty plea, he received two years probation and eighty hours community service (which must be completed within the next year.)

== Personal life ==
In the off season, Boogaard runs a hockey camp in Regina for 12- to 18-year-old youths. While the emphasis in the camp does cover fighting, Boogaard has countered by saying that with the league becoming bigger, stronger, and faster, the camp focuses with safety on the ice and how a player would defend themselves in the event of a fight.

He is the brother of the late Derek Boogaard, who had also spent the majority of his career with the Minnesota Wild.

Boogaard had his first child in 2019.

== Career statistics ==
			Regular season					Playoffs
Season	Team	League	GP	G	A	Pts	PIM	GP	G	A	Pts	PIM
2001–02	Regina Pat Canadians AAA	SMHL	38	1	6	7	95	—	—	—	—	—
2002–03	Calgary Hitmen	WHL	39	3	0	3	52	5	0	0	0	0
2003–04	Calgary Hitmen	WHL	12	0	1	1	24	—	—	—	—	—
2003–04	Melville Millionaires	SJHL	10	2	0	2	53	—	—	—	—	—
2003–04	Tri–City Americans	WHL	23	3	1	4	33	6	0	0	0	8
2004–05	Tri–City Americans	WHL	65	4	11	15	96	5	0	0	0	4
2005–06	Tri–City Americans	WHL	76	6	4	10	211	5	0	2	2	4
2006–07	Tri–City Americans	WHL	69	10	11	21	173	5	1	0	1	14
2007–08	Wheeling Nailers	ECHL	58	6	9	15	105	—	—	—	—	—
2007–08	Wilkes–Barre/Scranton Penguins	AHL	2	0	0	0	5	—	—	—	—	—
2008–09	Wilkes–Barre/Scranton Penguins	AHL	41	2	1	3	112	1	0	0	0	0
2009–10	Wilkes–Barre/Scranton Penguins	AHL	21	1	0	1	65	—	—	—	—	—
2009–10	Wheeling Nailers	ECHL	11	0	2	2	12	—	—	—	—	—
2010–11	Laredo Bucks	CHL	53	2	5	7	172	—	—	—	—	—
2011–12	Rio Grande Valley Killer Bees	CHL	56	6	6	12	129	5	0	0	0	13
2012–13	Wichita Thunder	CHL	56	1	4	5	122	3	0	0	0	5
2016–17	Milestone Flyers	QVHL	11	7	8	15	41	6	0	3	3	4
ECHL totals			69	6	11	17	117	—	—	—	—	—
AHL totals			64	3	1	4	182	1	0	0	0	0
CHL totals			165	9	15	24	423	8	0	0	0	18
