= Derek Boogaard =

Canadian ice hockey player (1982–2011)

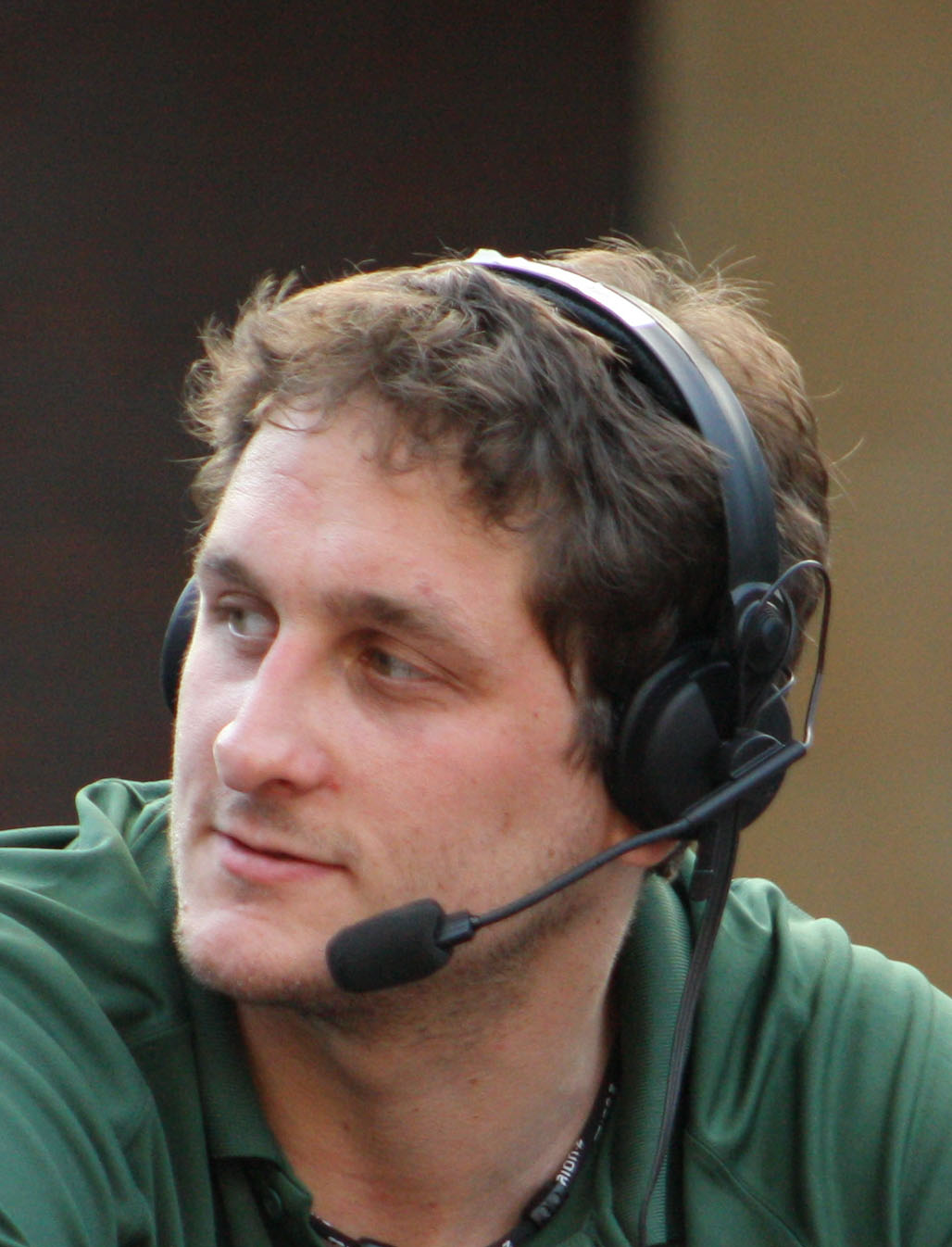
- Boogaard in 2009
- Born: June 23, 1982 Saskatoon, Saskatchewan, Canada
- Died: May 13, 2011 (aged 28) Minneapolis, Minnesota, U.S.
- Height: 6 ft 7 in (201 cm)
- Weight: 265 lb (120 kg; 18 st 13 lb)
- Position: Left wing
- Shot: Left
- Played for: Minnesota Wild; New York Rangers
- NHL draft: 202nd overall, 2001; Minnesota Wild
- Playing career: 2005–2011

Derek Leendert Boogaard (/ˈboʊɡɑːrd/ BOH-gard; later /ˈbuːɡɑːrd/ BOO-gard; June 23, 1982 – May 13, 2011) was a Canadian professional ice hockey left winger who played for the Minnesota Wild and the New York Rangers of the National Hockey League (NHL).

A native of Saskatchewan, where he grew up in several different communities as the son of a Mountie, he was known primarily as a fighter and enforcer throughout his career, from junior hockey to the pros. His fighting prowess earned him the nicknames of "Boogeyman" and "the Mountie", and made him a favourite with fans. In 2007, he was voted as the second-most-intimidating player in the NHL, behind Georges Laraque, who attributed his retirement in part to a desire to avoid the serious injury Boogaard could inflict, such as the cheekbone fracture Todd Fedoruk suffered that had to be repaired with metal plates.

Boogaard died at 28 from an accidental drug and alcohol overdose while recovering from a concussion. A posthumous examination of his brain found he had chronic traumatic encephalopathy more advanced than that seen in some former enforcers. That disclosure came shortly after the deaths of two other hockey enforcers, Rick Rypien and Wade Belak, both of whom were also under 40 and had similar health issues. The three deaths triggered a debate in the hockey community about the issues faced by enforcers and their place in the game. His parents unsuccessfully sued the NHL and its players' union over his death.

== Childhood and family ==
Boogaard was born in Saskatoon, Saskatchewan, the first of four children of Len Boogaard, an officer with the Royal Canadian Mounted Police (RCMP) and his wife Joanne, who were living in Hanley at the time. Derek Boogaard had two younger brothers, Ryan and Aaron, and a sister, Krysten. The family moved every few years due to the transfers required by the RCMP. While they lived for a time near Toronto, most of Len Boogaard's postings were in Saskatchewan.

Boogaard grew up in Herbert, a predominantly Mennonite community. He was taller than most children his age, reaching 6 feet 4 inches (193 cm) in height and 210 pounds (95 kg) by the age of 15. His adolescent growth spurt led to chronic pain in his knees. In school he struggled, especially with reading—his father believes Boogaard had "cognitive and behavioral issues", in particular impulsivity.

He was a frequent target of bullying, due to his size, shyness, and being the son of a police officer. When challenged to fights, he often won them decisively, though friends and family say he did not seek them out. "Derek would certainly stick up for the team, he would stick up for his teammates," recalled one of his youth hockey coaches, "but wasn't mean at all."

His family encouraged him to play hockey as an outlet, and his father would often drive him to distant games in his police car, an experience Boogaard was to recall fondly later in his life. He quit hockey briefly at the age of 12, but his family talked him into returning. In his early teens he stated that his goal in life was to play in the NHL, and idolized Wendel Clark, another Saskatchewan native who was at the time the captain of the Toronto Maple Leafs.

The Boogaards later moved to Melfort. Len would often drive his sons to Saskatoon for additional training in skating and boxing. In youth hockey Boogaard, because of his size, often got penalties that, his coach says, were not his fault. Parents of both teammates and opposing players complained that he was too large to be playing with children his age.

== Playing career ==
One night, while playing for the Melfort Mustangs, an unspecified incident led Boogaard to jump into the opposing bench and attempt to fight with opposing players, whose team was leading by a wide margin. "He had gone ballistic," said his father, who was in attendance. "It was something I hadn't seen before." Boogaard was ejected from the game, and after changing out of his uniform went to sit next to his father in the stands. Later they were approached by scouts from the Regina Pats of the Western Hockey League. They were impressed by Boogaard's boldness and offered him the chance to play junior hockey with the team, a first stop toward reaching the NHL.

=== Western Hockey League ===
By the time he began his junior hockey career, Boogaard had realized that if he wanted to make it to the NHL, he would only be able to do so as an enforcer, since fighting was his strongest skill. In his first scrimmage with the Pats, he was challenged by another large player on the team. Boogaard broke the other player's nose with his first punch.

==== Regina Pats ====
His parents divorced but both moved to Regina to be close to him. Boogaard's career there did not get off to a good start when he backed out of his first fight in a game against the Moose Jaw Warriors. As a result, he was reassigned to the lower-division Regina Pats of the Saskatchewan Junior Hockey League. He played there for most of the 1998–99 season, scoring two goals and five points in 35 games, with 166 penalty minutes (PIM).

The season was not a happy one for Boogaard. At one point he begged the coach to let him play during a tournament in Calgary, but was unsuccessful. He quit after the game and, his mother recalled, cried all the way home when she came to pick him up. That summer he got into a bar fight with some friends one night, during which, he wrote later, they beat up seven men around the age of 30.

By the next season he had reached his full adult height of 6 feet 7 inches (201 cm). The Pats called him back to training camp, and he got into 12 fights during the four scrimmages. He played in five games with the team, earning no points and 17 PIM. Early in his rookie season, he was traded to the Prince George Cougars after losing a fight in a game against the Kelowna Rockets.

==== Prince George Cougars ====
During his first season he suited up for 20 games, registering no points and had the third-highest penalty minutes total on the team with 149. He lost his first fight, against Eric Godard, a future NHL enforcer with the New York Islanders. "It was a very long year for me," he wrote later. "I struggled with everything it seemed." He had difficulty following rules and failed classes at school. Late in the season he suffered a broken jaw in a game against the Tri-City Americans, and was sent home to Regina to heal. He was expected to lose weight due to the liquid diet forced on him by having his jaw wired shut, but actually gained it when he found ways to get food through gaps in the wiring.

After considering quitting hockey again during training camp, he returned to the Cougars for a second season in 2000–01. He finally found a host family he could get along with, and began winning his fights on the ice. He avenged losses from previous seasons, including the one in which he had been injured. Prince George fans began chanting his name at games, and one poll named him the toughest player in the WHL's Western Conference.

In 61 games he scored a goal and nine points. His team-leading 245 PIM was the eighth highest total in the league. In the playoffs, Boogaard scored a goal in six games, while accumulating 30 PIM. "I don't think I ever saw our rink, or Derek, that happy as the time he scored that goal [in the playoffs]", said one of his assistant coaches. Boogaard agreed, writing "It was the best feeling I had the last 2 years." After the season, the Minnesota Wild drafted Boogaard in the seventh round, 202nd overall, in the 2001 NHL entry draft.

Boogaard began the 2001–02 season with the Cougars, appearing in two games, recording no points and 16 PIM. He was then traded to the Medicine Hat Tigers.

==== Medicine Hat Tigers ====
Boogaard finished the 2001–02 season with the Medicine Hat Tigers, as he appeared in 46 games with the team, scoring a goal and nine points, while having 178 PIM, third highest on the team.

He spent part of the 2002–03 with Medicine Hat, as he played in 27 games, getting a goal and three points, while registering 65 PIM.

=== National Hockey League ===
==== Minnesota Wild ====
Boogaard signed a professional contract with the Minnesota Wild, and they placed Boogaard with the Louisiana IceGators of the ECHL to finish the 2002–03 season. His coaches were told to develop him as an enforcer. They did not foresee him making it to the NHL, but his work ethic impressed them. "Give him credit", one later told The New York Times. "This guy willed his way to the NHL."

In 33 games with Louisiana, Boogaard had a goal and three points, along with a team high 240 PIM. In two playoff games, Boogaard had no points and no penalty minutes. He continued his skating and boxing lessons off the rink. He worked out by running up hills and practised his skills, both with coaches and on his own.

Chronic pain from older injuries grew during his time in the minors. His shoulder ached from an old collarbone fracture. One morning his back pain was so intense he could not lace his own skates. The team doctors frequently dispensed various medications to players so they could cope with such pain and the stressful schedule. Boogaard is said to have taken advantage of this.

The next season he was assigned to the Houston Aeros of the AHL, where he had no goals and four points in 53 games. His 207 PIM led the Aeros. In the playoffs, appeared in two games, earning an assist, while posting 16 PIM.

With the 2004–05 NHL lockout cancelling the NHL season, Boogaard returned to the Aeros for the 2004–05 season, as he scored a goal and five points in 56 games, as well as leading the team with 259 PIM. In five playoff games, Boogaard had no points, and put up 38 PIM.

In Houston his fame as an enforcer began to grow, as he was winning his fights. The team ran replays of his fights on the arena's video board, calling it the "Boogeyman Cam". They gave out a bobblehead of Boogaard, complete with bobbling fists. An opposing coach told his Aeros counterparts that Boogaard was their team's most valuable player due to his intimidating presence.

Boogaard made his NHL debut in the 2005–06 season. He made the Wild roster coming out of training camp when coach Jacques Lemaire saw the same intimidating effect on other teams his opposing coaches had, as well as the young player's propensity for winning fights.

The rookie first skated on October 5, 2005, getting no points in 3:58 of ice time in a 6–3 win over the Calgary Flames. Within the season's second week he would have his first assist, fight and goal. The assist came on a goal by Wes Walz on October 14, 2005, in a 5–3 loss to the Vancouver Canucks. Two days later, he had his first fight, knocking the Anaheim Ducks' Kip Brennan to the ice. He then scored his first NHL goal on October 19, 2005, beating San Jose Sharks goaltender Evgeni Nabokov in a 6–1 win over the San Jose Sharks. Boogaard finished his rookie season in the NHL with two goals, six points, while leading the Wild with 158 PIM in 65 games.

In 2006–07, Boogaard appeared in 48 games with the Wild, earning an assist, and leading the club with 120 PIM. Early that season, in another game against Anaheim, he broke Todd Fedoruk's cheekbone so severely in a fight that it had to be surgically rebuilt, with metal plates and mesh, adversely affecting Fedoruk's career. He made his NHL playoff debut on April 11, 2007, getting no points in a 2–1 loss to the Anaheim Ducks. Boogaard earned his first playoff point, earning an assist on April 17, 2007, in a 4–1 win over the Ducks. He finished the playoffs with four games played, one assist, and 20 PIM.

Near the end of one of the games in the Ducks series, with Minnesota leading, the two teams were bickering and taunting each other. During a timeout, the fans chanted Boogaard's name. He had not played at all in that game, and Lemaire sent him in. He simply skated in front of the Anaheim bench, and smiled. The crowd roared its applause. "If the roof wasn't screwed down, it would have flew off," his mother recalled. "He didn't have to fight, he didn't have to get hurt, he didn't have to hurt anybody. That was the best. He could just go out there and skate around." A video clip of the incident is a favourite of Boogaard's family and friends.

Boogaard played in 34 games with the Wild in the 2007–08 season, getting no points, while registering 74 PIM, the fourth highest total on the team. Fedoruk, who he had so severely injured the season before, signed with the Wild, becoming a teammate and friend. Boogaard himself became a popular player off the ice, his No. 24 jersey becoming one of the team's bestsellers. "It was the fierceness of his brand and the gentleness of his character" commented a team executive. In the playoffs, Boogaard went pointless in six games, while putting up 24 PIM, second highest total on the club.

He played in 51 games with Minnesota in 2008–09, getting three assists, and leading the team with 87 PIM. He earned an assist on October 16, 2008, against the Florida Panthers, which was his first point since getting an assist on February 8, 2007, also against the Florida Panthers. That represented a 49-game pointless drought.

During the season he had begun taking prescription pain relief medicine for back pain. After two surgeries later in the season, he was also prescribed Percocet. His brother Aaron says that due to his size Boogaard usually had to take extra amounts of the pills for them to have any effect. "He'd go through 30 pills in a couple of days. He'd need 8 to 10 at a time to feel OK.

He found that the Wild's team doctors did not keep track of who had prescribed what, and eventually secured from eight of them prescriptions for 11 different drugs, most of them containing hydrocodone, such as Vicodin. He also frequented a downtown Minneapolis sports bar where patrons who recognized him bought him drinks. He bought thousands of dollars' worth of additional prescription pills from another acquaintance. Often he would take eight OxyContin tablets at once, chewing them to offset the drug's time-release formula. His brother, Aaron, who lived with Boogaard during the off-season, often would hide the pills.

He developed an addiction, and missed training camp prior to the 2009–10 season. The team said he was recovering from a concussion, but he was actually at a drug rehabilitation centre in Southern California. He returned five games into the season, defeating David Koci of the Colorado Avalanche in his first fight.

Friends, teammates, coaches and family said that while Boogaard's play had not changed, his personality had. "He just was kind of—a blank face," recalled John Scott. He fell asleep at odd times and was late for meetings and workouts. The team warned other players not to share their own prescription medicines with him.

That season, Boogaard appeared in 57 games, his highest total since his rookie season in 2005–06. Boogaard had four points, and a team-high 105 PIM. On March 7, 2010, Boogaard was suspended for two games after a knee-on-knee hit against Edmonton Oilers forward Ryan Jones.

After the season, the Wild discreetly offered to trade him to other teams. Boogaard became an unrestricted free agent. The Wild offered to double his salary, but other teams could offer more. The Oilers and New York Rangers each offered $1.5 million a year. His family wanted him to sign with Edmonton so he could be closer to them, but he decided to play in New York instead. "It's one of the great cities to be at and you're always on center stage when you're out there, so I'm excited," Boogaard told the Minneapolis Star Tribune. The four-year, $6.5 million contract he signed with his new team was a lucrative deal for an enforcer.

==== New York Rangers ====
Boogaard reported to his new team at 300 pounds (140 kg), 40 pounds (18 kg) over his official weight. The Rangers feared his effectiveness might be diminished, and that he could be seriously injured in fights. But within a month of the new season, he had put those concerns to rest, scoring his first goal since his rookie season and winning fights.

He made his Rangers debut on October 9, 2010, earning no points in a 6–3 win over the Buffalo Sabres. Six days later he assisted on a Brian Boyle goal in a 4–3 loss to the Toronto Maple Leafs, his first point as a Ranger. In early November he defeated the Philadelphia Flyers's Jody Shelley in a fight, and scored on Michal Neuvirth of the Washington Capitals in a 5–3 loss, ending a 234-game scoring drought. Rangers' fans chanted his name in the next home game as he defeated Edmonton's Steve MacIntyre. In a second fight during that game, MacIntyre broke his nose, probably causing Boogaard another concussion.

A month later, Boogaard suffered a season-ending concussion in a fight with Matt Carkner of the Ottawa Senators. Carkner struck first and Boogaard, instead of retaliating with blows of his own, held on and looked away. "I noticed he kind of stopped fighting and I took him down and landed on top," Carkner said after the game. "It feels good to take down a big man like that."

Overall, Boogaard appeared in 22 games with the Rangers, scoring a goal and two points, while registering 45 PIM. The team attributed his absence to a shoulder injury, later adding that he was experiencing headaches. Placed on injured reserve for the remainder of the season, he became a recluse in his midtown Manhattan apartment, enduring post-concussion syndrome.

He was told to avoid the rink because the sight could induce nausea. The Rangers sent over a balanced meal every day, but Boogaard often discarded it in favour of fast food. Once a week he drove to the Long Island suburb of Huntington to illicitly buy thousands of dollars' worth of the same prescription medicines he was addicted to from a dealer there. When his father visited him in January, Boogaard cried in his arms several times.

Other visitors, old friends who had come to see him play and sightsee earlier in the season, no longer did. He grew lonely in his apartment, and ran up high phone bills contacting people, some of whom he had not talked to in years. His 222-page cell-phone bill for February 2011 listed 13,724 separate text messages.

Those who did come noticed more striking changes in his personality. He was darker, going from mania to depression, and took little care of himself. The likeable qualities that had endeared him to fans in Minneapolis were less in evidence. He joked that his increasing memory lapses were the result of all the past punches he had taken.

He returned to the ice for light workouts in March, but collapsed while skating within days. The Rangers sent him back to California for rehab. Aaron Boogaard, who visited his brother there, said the two often exercised and relaxed on the beach while Derek skipped meetings or therapy sessions. Credit card records show that Boogaard spent $32,000 in two weeks there, including $1,200 on dinner one night and $5,000 renting a Porsche. Friends he contacted during this time thought he was just on vacation. During a recess, he flew to New York, bought more pills and drove them to his apartment in Minnesota.

== Death ==
In May 2011, Boogaard was granted another recess to attend his sister's graduation from the University of Kansas. He and brother Aaron went from California back to Minneapolis, planning to spend a few days together with Ryan, the other Boogaard brother. On the night of May 12, Boogaard went out with friends. Before they left the apartment, Aaron gave Derek what he said later was a 30 mg Percocet tablet (Note: Although this is what Aaron Boogaard told the Minneapolis police, Percocet is not made at a dosage level any higher than 10 mg per tablet, according to Endo Pharmaceuticals, its manufacturer. ("Percocet oxycodone and acetaminophen tablets USP" (PDF). Endo Pharmaceuticals. May 2011. Archived from the original (PDF) on August 6, 2012.)) he had been holding for his brother.

Boogaard and his friends went to a steakhouse for dinner, where he consumed some mixed drinks along with his steak. They then circulated among four different bars, drinking more as they did.

On his return home, Boogaard went to the bathroom, then the bedroom, several times before his friends left. At 3 am, he called Aaron from the kitchen, where he had been making pancakes, several times, complaining that the bed was spinning. "He was miserable", Aaron recalled. Boogaard finally stopped, apparently asleep, and Aaron went to a girlfriend's house and did not return until the afternoon.

When he did, Boogaard was still in bed. Assuming his brother was still hung over from alcohol use, Aaron said that he was going to pick Ryan up at the airport. When he returned, Ryan, who had like his father become an RCMP officer, saw that Derek's body was not moving and that rigor mortis had set in. The two called 9-1-1 and their parents.

Firefighters who responded first declared him dead at the scene. An autopsy found that the cause of Boogaard's death was an accidental overdose of alcohol and oxycodone. "The coroner said with that mixture, he probably died as soon as he closed his eyes," said Aaron.

His family subsequently agreed to donate his brain to the Sports Legacy Institute at Boston University Medical School which studies the brains of athletes in high-contact sports. The SLI is especially interested in the degenerative brain condition chronic traumatic encephalopathy (CTE), which can only be diagnosed after death.

Two months later, SLI doctor Ann McKee told the family in a conference call that Boogaard had indeed suffered from the ailment, with significant damage to his brain tissue. His CTE was more advanced than that of another former NHL player, Bob Probert, an enforcer who had recently died at the age of 45, and likely would have led to middle-aged dementia had he lived.

On July 22, 2011, Aaron was charged with unlawful distribution of a controlled substance. The charge was dismissed in October 2011, at the same time he pleaded guilty to tampering with the scene of a death, a misdemeanor, since he had admitted to police that he had flushed the remaining pills down the toilet before they arrived. He was sentenced to probation and 80 hours of community service.

After his brain was removed for the SLI study, Boogaard's body was cremated. His mother keeps the ashes in an informal shrine to her son in her home in Regina. The next season, the Wild paid tribute to Boogaard with a highlight video and moment of silence. His family was presented with flowers, a painting of Boogaard and a framed jersey at centre ice.

=== Issues raised ===
While the circumstances of Boogaard's death were not in doubt, it raised some questions about how it might have been prevented. Two similar deaths led to a debate over the issues faced by hockey enforcers and even their continuing role in the game, as well as the NHL's attitude toward the health problems resulting from concussions. Boogaard's father has also expressed concern over the way his son's drug abuse was handled and possibly enabled by the teams he played for.

In August 2011, four months after Boogaard's death, two enforcers, Rick Rypien and the retired Wade Belak, died as well. Rypien, who was also in his late 20s, committed suicide. The 35-year-old Belak's death was described initially as a suicide but family and friends say it was accidental. Both had also experienced depression, like Boogaard.

The deaths led some former enforcers and sportswriters to question whether the league was doing enough to deal with the effects of the many concussions enforcers suffered and the stress of their role. Georges Laraque, a successful enforcer who had retired recently, said he had never liked being one despite the long career and adulation it brought him. Many other enforcers drank heavily to deal with the anxiety of knowing that they would have to fight every game. Don Cherry, a former Boston Bruins coach and former television commentator, responded by calling second-guessers such as Laraque "pukes" and "hypocrites". In December The New York Times devoted a lengthy three-part series to Boogaard's life and death that addressed many of the issues.

While the league has taken some steps to address the concussion problem, most recently in banning blindside hits to the head and requiring that players suffering head injuries be examined in a quiet room away from the bench, it is still not convinced that the CTE found in Boogaard and other players posthumously is a direct result of their hockey careers. "There isn't a lot of data, and the experts who we talked to, who consult with us, think that it's way premature to be drawing any conclusions at this point," says commissioner Gary Bettman. In its announcement of its findings, the SLI said:

The association between Boogaard's brain pathology and his clinical symptoms, specifically the behavioural changes and memory problems he experienced in his last two years, is unclear. For example, his clinical symptoms occurred during the same time period he was exhibiting narcotic abuse. CTE has been found in other deceased athletes who have died from overdoses or who had problems with substance abuse. It is unknown if the substance abuse is caused by the impulse control problems associated with CTE or if they are unrelated.

Len Boogaard, now in a desk job with the RCMP, has been investigating his son's drug use when he can, trying to see which of Derek's many prescriptions were justified, and finding out what his contacts knew. When he visited Derek in New York a few months before his death, he was astounded to find out that his son was still getting prescriptions from team doctors despite his recent history of abuse and treatment. At one point, he alleges, Derek received a four-day advance notice of his next drug test. "We worked very closely with Derek on and off the ice to provide him with the very best possible care," said general manager Glen Sather in a statement.

=== Litigation by parents ===
In September 2012, the Boogaards filed a lawsuit against the National Hockey League Players' Association (NHLPA), in Los Angeles seeking $9.8 million in damages. They alleged that the union was negligent in failing to file a grievance against the Rangers, as they advised the Boogaards they would, after their son's death for the balance of the money on his contract. While it only named the NHLPA as a defendant, there was speculation that it would raise issues about the culpability of both teams, the league and the drug treatment facility that Boogaard attended. The Boogaards' lawyer declined to say whether additional suits were being planned; the union said the suit was without merit. Early in 2013 it was dismissed; the judge ruled that the Boogaards had waited too long to make their claim.

Shortly afterwards, the Boogaards filed a new suit, this time against the NHL. In a case brought in an Illinois state court by the firm representing former NFL players in their lawsuit against their league over concussion injuries, they alleged wrongful death against the league. The suit claimed that indiscriminate prescriptions for painkillers issued to Boogaard by Wild and Rangers' team physicians had led to his addiction, and that the drug treatment programs Boogaard had been sent to took any action to discipline him despite being aware of multiple rule violations and failed drug tests. Lastly, the Boogaards said the league should have been aware of the increased risks of concussions faced by enforcers. They did not name a specific amount of damages sought, instead asking that it be left to a jury to determine.

The NHL successfully moved to have the case removed to federal court in Chicago, which dismissed the suit in 2017 on procedural grounds. Judge Gary Feinerman held that under Minnesota law, a wrongful-death action could only be filed by a court-appointed trustee, which the Boogaards were not, and that deadline had passed before the suit was filed. The Boogaards had also failed to state a claim, and failed to respond in substance to the NHL's arguments that they had. The Seventh Circuit Court of Appeals affirmed that dismissal in May 2018.

=== Suspect arrest ===
On September 9, 2014, The New York Times reported that Jordan Hart, a former player of the Utah Grizzlies and the son of former Islander Gerry Hart, was arrested for selling Boogaard the Percocet pills that eventually led to his death. The painkillers were obtained through illegal prescriptions issued to Hart by Oscar Johnson, a medical contact from Hart's career with the Grizzlies. Hart faced up to twenty years in prison if found guilty and Johnson's court hearing was scheduled for late September 2014 for "26 counts of distributing and possessing with intent to distribute the drug". Hart was sentenced on October 6, 2016, to one year of probation and 100 hours of community service.

== Role as an enforcer ==
Boogaard's knockout of fellow enforcer Todd Fedoruk in a fight during a game against the Anaheim Ducks helped spark debate over increasing the punishment for fighting in the NHL. During this fight, Boogaard landed a brutal punch to the cheek sending Fedoruk to the ice. As a result, Fedoruk had to undergo surgery to reconstruct his shattered cheek using titanium plates. Fedoruk and Boogaard would later become teammates in Minnesota during the 2007–08 season. On November 6, 2005, Boogaard knocked out the Ducks' enforcer Trevor Gillies with an uppercut to the jaw.

Anxiety over having to face Boogaard, even occasionally, and the possibility the younger man might inflict similar injuries on him, led Georges Laraque to retire. "I knew sooner or later he would get the better of me," he said after Boogaard's death. "And I just—I like my face, and I just didn't want to have it broken."

Boogaard and his brother Aaron, who played hockey for the Rio Grande Valley Killer Bees of the Central Hockey League, ran the Derek and Aaron Boogaard Fighting Camp in Regina, Saskatchewan, for children aged 12 to 18. This sparked some controversy, with some people siding with the Boogaards, saying that they are teaching children how to not get hurt in a fight, and others opposing them, with the position that the Boogaards' camp encourages children to fight.

== Career statistics ==
| | | | Regular season | | | | | Playoffs |
| Season | Team | League | GP | G | A | Pts | PIM | GP | G | A | Pts | PIM |
|---|---|---|---|---|---|---|---|---|---|---|---|---|
| 1998–99 | Regina Pat Canadians AAA | SMHL | 28 | 1 | 3 | 4 | 206 | — | — | — | — | — |
| 1999–2000 | Regina Pats | WHL | 5 | 0 | 0 | 0 | 17 | — | — | — | — | — |
| 1999–2000 | Prince George Cougars | WHL | 33 | 0 | 0 | 0 | 149 | — | — | — | — | — |
| 2000–01 | Prince George Cougars | WHL | 61 | 1 | 8 | 9 | 245 | 6 | 1 | 0 | 1 | 31 |
| 2001–02 | Prince George Cougars | WHL | 2 | 0 | 0 | 0 | 16 | — | — | — | — | — |
| 2001–02 | Medicine Hat Tigers | WHL | 46 | 1 | 8 | 9 | 178 | — | — | — | — | — |
| 2002–03 | Medicine Hat Tigers | WHL | 27 | 1 | 2 | 3 | 65 | — | — | — | — | — |
| 2002–03 | Louisiana IceGators | ECHL | 33 | 1 | 2 | 3 | 240 | 2 | 0 | 0 | 0 | 0 |
| 2003–04 | Houston Aeros | AHL | 53 | 0 | 4 | 4 | 207 | 2 | 0 | 1 | 1 | 16 |
| 2004–05 | Houston Aeros | AHL | 56 | 1 | 4 | 5 | 259 | 5 | 0 | 0 | 0 | 38 |
| 2005–06 | Minnesota Wild | NHL | 65 | 2 | 4 | 6 | 158 | — | — | — | — | — |
| 2006–07 | Minnesota Wild | NHL | 48 | 0 | 1 | 1 | 120 | 4 | 0 | 1 | 1 | 20 |
| 2007–08 | Minnesota Wild | NHL | 34 | 0 | 0 | 0 | 74 | 6 | 0 | 0 | 0 | 24 |
| 2008–09 | Minnesota Wild | NHL | 51 | 0 | 3 | 3 | 87 | — | — | — | — | — |
| 2009–10 | Minnesota Wild | NHL | 57 | 0 | 4 | 4 | 105 | — | — | — | — | — |
| 2010–11 | New York Rangers | NHL | 22 | 1 | 1 | 2 | 45 | — | — | — | — | — |
| NHL totals | | | 277 | 3 | 13 | 16 | 589 | 10 | 0 | 1 | 1 | 44 |

== See also ==
- List of deaths from drug overdose and intoxication
- List of ice hockey players who died during their careers
- List of Minnesota Wild players
- List of New York Rangers players
