= Boris Elik =

Canadian ice hockey player

- Born: October 17, 1929; Geraldton, Ontario, Canada
- Died: May 2, 2013 (aged 83); Toronto, Ontario, Canada
- Height: 5 ft 11 in (180 cm)
- Weight: 190 lb (86 kg; 13 st 8 lb)
- Position: Left wing
- Shot: Left
- Played for: Detroit Red Wings
- Playing career: 1950–1963

Boris "Bo" Elik (October 17, 1929 – May 2, 2013) was a Canadian ice hockey left winger who played 3 games in the National Hockey League with the Detroit Red Wings during the 1962–63 season. The rest of his career, which lasted from 1950 to 1963, was spent in the minor leagues. He was born in Geraldton, Ontario in 1929 and died in Toronto, Ontario in 2013.

== Career statistics ==
=== Regular season and playoffs ===
			Regular season					Playoffs
Season	Team	League	GP	G	A	Pts	PIM	GP	G	A	Pts	PIM
1949–50	Sundridge Beavers	OHA	—	—	—	—	—	—	—	—	—	—
1950–51	North Bay Black Hawks	EOHL	37	18	18	36	32	—	—	—	—	—
1951–52	North Bay Black Hawks	EOHL	31	13	8	21	45	11	3	5	8	19
1952–53	North Bay Trappers	NOHA	48	18	17	35	67	7	2	1	3	17
1953–54	North Bay Trappers	NOHA	33	12	18	30	33	4	2	1	3	18
1954–55	North Bay Trappers	NOHA	55	18	25	43	52	12	7	6	13	6
1955–56	North Bay Trappers	NOHA	55	20	23	43	50	8	5	2	7	8
1955–56	Cleveland Barons	AHL	1	0	1	1	0	—	—	—	—	—
1956–57	Cleveland Barons	AHL	61	40	40	80	82	12	4	6	10	8
1957–58	Cleveland Barons	AHL	70	31	37	68	129	7	0	4	4	4
1958–59	Rochester Americans	AHL	14	1	7	8	28	—	—	—	—	—
1958–59	Providence Reds	AHL	50	19	27	46	44	—	—	—	—	—
1959–60	Providence Reds	AHL	69	26	27	53	75	5	0	1	1	2
1960–61	Providence Reds	AHL	51	10	20	30	46	—	—	—	—	—
1961–62	Pittsburgh Hornets	AHL	64	21	19	40	112	—	—	—	—	—
1962–63	Detroit Red Wings	NHL	3	0	0	0	0	—	—	—	—	—
1962–63	Pittsburgh Hornets	AHL	7	0	0	0	0	—	—	—	—	—
1962–64	Edmonton Flyers	WHL	58	22	25	47	79	3	5	0	5	0
AHL totals			387	148	178	326	516	24	4	11	15	14
NHL totals			3	0	0	0	0	—	—	—	—	—
