= James Hendry (GC) =

Recipient of the George Cross

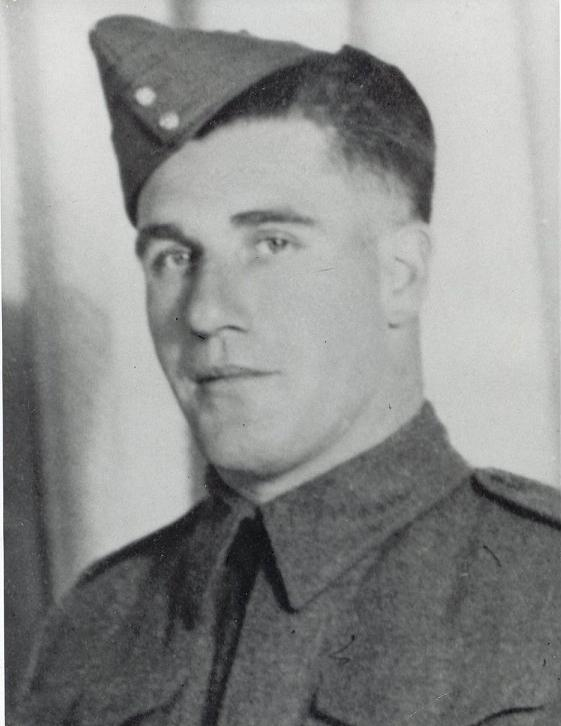
- Born: 20 December 1911; Falkirk, Scotland
- Died: 13 June 1941 (aged 29); Loch Laggan, Scotland
- Burial place: Brookwood Military Cemetery, Surrey
- Military career
- Allegiance: Canada
- Branch: Canadian Army
- Service years: 1940–1941
- Rank: Corporal
- Unit: Royal Canadian Engineers
- Conflicts: Second World War
- Awards: George Cross

James Hendry, GC (20 December 1911 – 13 June 1941) was a Canadian soldier who was posthumously awarded the George Cross for gallantry and self-sacrifice displayed on 13 June 1941 while attempting to extinguish a fire in an explosives store.

== Early life ==
Hendry was born in Falkirk, Scotland, on 20 December 1911, to John and Janet Hendry. The family lived in Greenstone, Ontario, before the war with several working in the local gold mines.

== George Cross ==
Hendry was serving with No. 1 Tunnelling Company of the Corps of Royal Canadian Engineers, who had been given the task of digging the tunnel between Loch Spey and Loch Laggan in the Scottish Highlands to supply water to the British Aluminium works at Fort William, Scotland, when a fire broke out in an explosives store near Loch Laggan. He ordered his colleagues to run to safety and attempted to extinguish the blaze rather than attempt to escape the inevitable explosion. The blast also killed his colleague Sapper John MacDougall Stewart, and seven more were injured.

Hendry was buried in Brookwood Military Cemetery in Surrey, England. The Royal Canadian Engineers dedicated their range control building at Camp Meaford to the corporal in recognition of his bravery in 1994. In August 2008, a memorial cairn honouring Hendry was unveiled at Loch Laggan near where he was killed. The ceremony was attended by his last surviving brother, William Hendry, of Thunder Bay, Ontario.
