= Kelsey Wilson =

Canadian ice hockey player

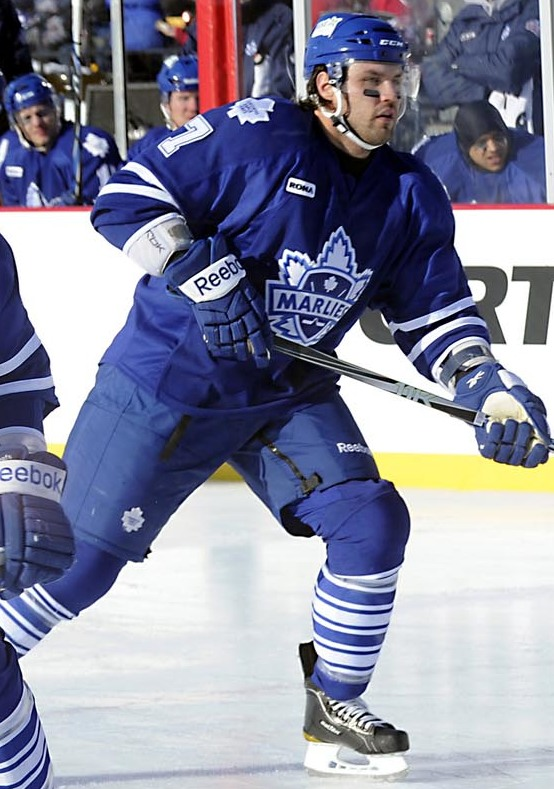
- Wilson with the Toronto Marlies in 2012
- Born: January 22, 1986 (age 40) Geraldton, Ontario, Canada
- Height: 6 ft 1 in (185 cm)
- Weight: 210 lb (95 kg; 15 st 0 lb)
- Position: Left wing
- Shot: Left
- Played for: Milwaukee Admirals; EC Red Bull Salzburg; Toronto Marlies; San Francisco Bulls; Trenton Titans; Nottingham Panthers; Utica Comets; HC Banska Bystrica; Coventry Blaze
- NHL draft: Undrafted
- Playing career: 2006–2014

Kelsey Wilson (born January 22, 1986) is a Canadian former professional ice hockey player.

On October 6, 2006, Wilson was signed as a free agent by the Nashville Predators, and on May 17, 2010, he was re-signed by Predators to a further one-year contract. He played for their AHL affiliate, the Milwaukee Admirals.

On July 27, 2011, Wilson signed with the Toronto Maple Leafs organization.

In January 2014 Wilson signed to the EIHL team Coventry Blaze.
