= Third wheel =

Third wheel, a term for someone who is superfluous, may refer to:

== Film and television ==
- The Third Wheel (film), a 2002 American romantic comedy
- "Third Wheel" (How I Met Your Mother), a 2007 TV episode
- "Third Wheel" (Mickey Mouse), a 2014 TV episode
- "The Third Wheel" (The O.C.), a 2004 TV episode
- "The Third Wheel" (That '70s Show), a 2001 TV episode

== Other uses ==
- Diary of a Wimpy Kid: The Third Wheel, the seventh book of the Diary of a Wimpy Kid series
- "Third Wheel", a 1990 song by the Servants from Disinterest
- "Third Wheel", a 2022 song by Zoe Wees

== See also ==
- Fifth wheel (disambiguation)
- Superfluous (disambiguation)
