= Fifth wheel (Brooks Walker) =

Invention by Brooks Walker

Brooks Walker was an American inventor. His inventions included Venetian blinds. At the time of his death in 1984, he owned over 250 patents. Walker owned the Shasta Forest lumber company.

== Early life ==
He was born in Minneapolis. He earned a mechanical engineering degree from U.C. Berkeley, in 1925.

== Fifth wheel ==
In the 1930s, Walker invented a device which added a fifth wheel to cars to aid parallel parking. The extra wheel was mounted on the rear of the vehicle, at right angles to the rest of the wheels. When in use, the fifth wheel lifted the back of the car off its normal rear wheels, allowing the rear of the car to swing laterally.

Walker was granted a patent for his device, described as a "vehicle lifting and traversing device", in 1935. He demonstrated the device, which was featured in LIFE magazine.

He was unable to sell his invention to the automotive industry. Walker continued to attempt to market his device into the 1970s.
