= Fifth Wheel Truck Stops =

Coordinates: 43°31′28″N 79°54′08″W

Logo of the Fifth Wheel Truck Stops

The Fifth Wheel Truck Stops was a chain of truck stops, with locations in Ontario, Manitoba and New Brunswick. They also offered motel service, restaurants, and truck/RV cleaning.

The Milton location appeared in key scenes of the 1978 film High-Ballin'.

== History ==
The chain was founded in Milton, Ontario, with gasoline first being pumped there in February 1972 and a restaurant opening the following November. It was founded by Lewis Loveridge and Claude Warren, with Jim Powers owning the adjoining restaurant. It was the first full-service truck stop to be established in Canada.

In addition to Milton, it opened truck stops in other locations:

- Cornwall (1976) (2013: Gas stop only)
- Dorchester (1978)
- Bowmanville and North Bay (1979)
- Perth-Andover, New Brunswick and Winnipeg, Manitoba (1984)
- Grimsby (1988)

In 1992, the Open Road Chapel was formed, with its first nondenominational chapel set up at the Fifth Wheel in Milton. Between 1993 and 2010, further chapels were established at Fifth Wheel's other Southern Ontario locations, which laid the base for expansion to other sites across Canada.

In 1993, the chain's business model was converted to that of a franchising operation.

The Fifth Wheel faced competition from the TravelCenters of America and Flying J chains. The chain closed in September 2015.
