= Todd Fedoruk =

Canadian ice hockey player

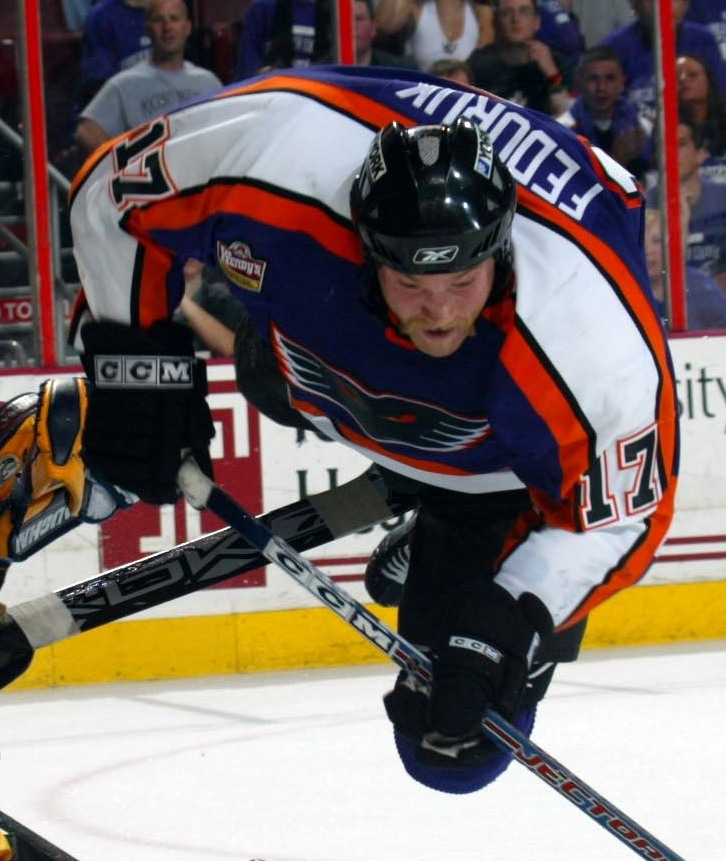
- Fedoruk with the Philadelphia Phantoms during the 2005 Calder Cup Finals
- Born: February 13, 1979 (age 47) Redwater, Alberta, Canada
- Height: 6 ft 2 in (188 cm)
- Weight: 240 lb (109 kg; 17 st 2 lb)
- Position: Left wing
- Shot: Left
- Played for: Philadelphia Flyers; Anaheim Ducks; Dallas Stars; Minnesota Wild; Phoenix Coyotes; Tampa Bay Lightning
- NHL draft: 164th overall, 1997; Philadelphia Flyers
- Playing career: 1999–2010

Todd Julian Fedoruk (born February 13, 1979) is a Canadian former professional ice hockey left winger who played nine seasons in the National Hockey League (NHL) for six different teams. Todd has Ukrainian origin.

== Playing career ==
Fedoruk spent his first seven professional seasons in the Philadelphia Flyers organization after being drafted 164th overall in 1997. He made his NHL debut during the 2000–01 season and played in 220 games over four seasons with the club, recording at least 100 penalty minutes in each season. He played with the American Hockey League (AHL)'s Philadelphia Phantoms during the 2004–05 NHL lockout and took part in the team's run to the Calder Cup championship.

Shortly after the lockout ended, Fedoruk was traded to the Mighty Ducks of Anaheim in exchange for a 2005 second-round draft pick (Pierre-Olivier Pelletier) on July 29, 2005. The 2005–06 season saw Fedoruk post career highs in games played (76), assists (19), points (23) and penalty minutes (174) as a member of the Ducks. The Flyers re-acquired Fedoruk on November 13, 2006, for a fourth-round draft pick.

Fedoruk, who is known for his skills as an enforcer, had titanium plates permanently embedded into his face to repair injuries caused in a fight with Minnesota Wild enforcer Derek Boogaard during the 2006–07 NHL season. Later that season, on March 21, 2007, Fedoruk was once again injured, in a fight against New York Rangers enforcer Colton Orr—Fedoruk was knocked unconscious and had to be carried off the ice on a stretcher.

On July 9, 2007, Fedoruk signed a one-year contract with the Dallas Stars. In at start of the 2007–08 season, Fedoruk struggled to make the lineup and played only a handful of games before he was demoted to the club's AHL affiliate, the Iowa Stars, on November 20, 2007. Before playing a game with Iowa, Fedoruk was claimed off waivers by the Minnesota Wild on November 22, 2007. Fedoruk played out the season with the Wild and scored his first career playoff goal during the Wild's first round defeat to the Colorado Avalanche.

Fedoruk signed a three-year contract with the Phoenix Coyotes on July 1, 2008. In the 2008–09 season, he played in 72 games with the Coyotes, scoring 13 points.

On July 21, 2009, Fedoruk was traded (alongside David Hale) to the Tampa Bay Lightning in exchange for Radim Vrbata.

On August 4, 2011, the Vancouver Canucks signed Fedoruk on a try-out contract to attend training camp. After the conclusion of training camp and in the midst of the pre-season on October 1, 2011, Fedoruk was released by the Canucks without a contract offer, effectively ending his professional career.

== Facial injuries ==
On November 11, 2003, Fedoruk was involved in a fight with New York Islanders defenseman Eric Cairns. Fedoruk was deemed to have the better of the exchange at the time but it was not readily apparent that a right from Cairns had broken Fedoruk's orbital bone. Fedoruk underwent surgery, and was back on the ice not long after.

On October 24, 2006, while Fedoruk was playing with the Anaheim Ducks, he challenged Minnesota Wild enforcer Derek Boogaard to a fight. Boogaard landed a brutal punch on Fedoruk that knocked him to the ice and shattered his cheek bone. Fedoruk left the ice immediately after the fight, but was in visible distress, and would not return for the rest of the night. Afterward, Fedoruk underwent considerable surgery to reconstruct the side of his face.

Fedoruk was then traded from Anaheim to his former club, the Philadelphia Flyers. While playing for the Flyers, Fedoruk was involved in another fight, this time with New York Rangers enforcer Colton Orr. During this fight, Fedoruk was knocked out due to a wild right from Orr. He lay on the ice, unable to move for around four minutes before being put on a stretcher.

== Post-retirement ==
On November 9, 2011, Fedoruk was named assistant coach of the Flyers' ECHL affiliate, the Trenton Titans, for which he had played 18 games in 1999–2000 as a Flyers prospect. He served in the role for two seasons until 2013.

Fedoruk has been a resident of Mount Laurel, New Jersey, with his wife and three children.

== Career statistics ==
			Regular season					Playoffs
Season	Team	League	GP	G	A	Pts	PIM	GP	G	A	Pts	PIM
1995–96	Kelowna Rockets	WHL	44	1	1	2	83	4	0	0	0	6
1996–97	Kelowna Rockets	WHL	31	1	5	6	87	6	0	0	0	13
1997–98	Kelowna Rockets	WHL	31	3	5	8	120	—	—	—	—	—
1997–98	Regina Pats	WHL	21	4	3	7	80	9	1	2	3	23
1998–99	Regina Pats	WHL	39	12	12	24	107	—	—	—	—	—
1998–99	Prince Albert Raiders	WHL	28	6	4	10	75	13	1	6	7	49
1999–00	Trenton Titans	ECHL	18	2	5	7	118	—	—	—	—	—
1999–00	Philadelphia Phantoms	AHL	19	1	2	3	40	5	0	1	1	2
2000–01	Philadelphia Phantoms	AHL	14	0	1	1	49	—	—	—	—	—
2000–01	Philadelphia Flyers	NHL	53	5	5	10	109	2	0	0	0	20
2001–02	Philadelphia Phantoms	AHL	7	0	1	1	54	—	—	—	—	—
2001–02	Philadelphia Flyers	NHL	55	3	4	7	141	3	0	0	0	0
2002–03	Philadelphia Flyers	NHL	63	1	5	6	105	1	0	0	0	0
2003–04	Philadelphia Flyers	NHL	49	1	4	5	136	1	0	0	0	2
2003–04	Philadelphia Phantoms	AHL	2	0	2	2	2	—	—	—	—	—
2004–05	Philadelphia Phantoms	AHL	42	4	12	16	142	16	2	2	4	33
2005–06	Mighty Ducks of Anaheim	NHL	76	4	19	23	174	12	0	0	0	16
2006–07	Anaheim Ducks	NHL	10	0	3	3	36	—	—	—	—	—
2006–07	Philadelphia Flyers	NHL	48	3	8	11	84	—	—	—	—	—
2007–08	Dallas Stars	NHL	11	0	2	2	33	—	—	—	—	—
2007–08	Minnesota Wild	NHL	58	6	5	11	106	6	1	1	2	16
2008–09	Phoenix Coyotes	NHL	72	6	7	13	72	—	—	—	—	—
2009–10	Tampa Bay Lightning	NHL	50	3	3	6	54	—	—	—	—	—
NHL totals			545	32	65	97	1050	25	1	1	2	54
