= 2011–12 Rio Grande Valley Killer Bees season =

2011–12 Rio Grande Valley Killer Bees (CHL)
- Conference: Berry
- 2011–12 record: 32-27-7
- Home record: 20-8-5
- Road record: 12-19-2
- Goals for: 208
- Goals against: 200

Team information
- General manager: Terry Ruskowski
- Coach: Terry Ruskowski
- Arena: State Farm Arena
- Average attendance: 3,563

Team leaders
- Goals: Aaron Lee (38)
- Assists: Dan Gendur (45)
- Points: Dan Gendur (73)
- Penalty minutes: Aaron Boogaard (129)
- Plus/minus: Scott Balan (+14)
- Wins: John Murray (16)
- Goals against average: John Murray (2.66)

The Rio Grande Valley Killer Bees of Hidalgo, Texas, played their ninth season in the Central Hockey League in 2011–12.

== Regular season ==
=== Conference standings ===
Berry Conference	GP	W	L	OTL	GF	GA	Pts
z-Allen Americans	66	47	16	3	271	211	97
x-Bossier-Shreveport Mudbugs	66	37	26	3	229	193	77
x-Tulsa Oilers	66	35	25	6	242	234	76
x-Texas Brahmas	66	34	27	5	227	228	73
x-Odessa Jackalopes	66	31	28	7	241	238	69
x-Mississippi RiverKings	66	30	31	5	199	229	65
x-Arizona Sundogs	66	25	31	10	204	253	60
x-Rio Grande Valley Killer Bees	66	25	35	6	194	232	56
Laredo Bucks	66	24	34	8	194	228	56

x – Qualified for playoffs; y – Won division; z – Won regular season league title After games of March 27, 2011.

== Roster ==
Updated March 10, 2012.

No.	Nat	Player	Pos	S/G	Age	Acquired	Birthplace	Contract
	(Canada)	Marc-Andre Carre	LW	L	33	2011	Baie-Comeau, Quebec	Killer Bees
	(Canada)	Dan Dunn	G	L	36	2011	Oshawa, Ontario	Killer Bees
	(Canada)	Travis Eggum	F	L	34	2011	Saskatoon, Saskatchewan	Killer Bees
10	(Canada)	Dan Gendur	RW	R	37	2010	Vancouver, British Columbia	Killer Bees
21	(Slovakia)	Tomas Klempa	F	L	41	2010	Piestany, Slovakia	Killer Bees
9	(Canada)	Aaron Lee	F	L	40	2008	Calgary, Alberta	Killer Bees
	(United States)	Danny Markowitz	D	R	37	2011	Jericho, New York	Killer Bees
	(Canada)	Dan Nicholls	F		37	2011	Whitby, Ontario	Killer Bees
	(United States)	Zach Pearson	RW	R	41	2011	White Lake, Michigan	Killer Bees
8	(Canada)	Kyle Radke	D	L	39	2010	Bashaw, Alberta	Killer Bees
	(Canada)	Matt Ridley	D	L	34	2011	Kelowna, British Columbia	Killer Bees
30	(United States)	John Murray	G	L	37	2011	Lancaster, Pennsylvania	Killer Bees

== See also ==
- 2011–12 CHL season
