= 2010–11 Laredo Bucks season =

Ice Hockey team season

2010–11 Laredo Bucks
- Conference: 9th Berry
- 2010–11 record: 24-34-8
- Home record: 15-14-4
- Road record: 9-20-4
- Goals for: 194
- Goals against: 228

Team information
- Coach: Terry Ruskowski
- Captain: Serge Dube
- Alternate captains: Jeff Bes; Chris Korchinski
- Arena: Laredo Energy Arena

Team leaders
- Goals: Daniel Koger (29)
- Assists: Neil Trimm (58)
- Points: Neil Trimm (80)
- Penalty minutes: Hans Benson (221)
- Plus/minus: Neil Trimm (+25)
- Wins: Torrie Jung (17)
- Goals against average: Torrie Jung (3.27)

The 2010–11 Laredo Bucks season was the ninth season of the CHL franchise in Laredo, Texas.

== Off-season ==
It was announced that the Laredo Bucks would be in the Berry Conference the former Southern Conference.

== Regular season ==
=== Conference standings ===
Berry Conference	GP	W	L	OTL	GF	GA	Pts
z-Allen Americans	66	47	16	3	271	211	97
x-Bossier-Shreveport Mudbugs	66	37	26	3	229	193	77
x-Tulsa Oilers	66	35	25	6	242	234	76
x-Texas Brahmas	66	34	27	5	227	228	73
x-Odessa Jackalopes	66	31	28	7	241	238	69
x-Mississippi RiverKings	66	30	31	5	199	229	65
x-Arizona Sundogs	66	25	31	10	204	253	60
x-Rio Grande Valley Killer Bees	66	25	35	6	194	232	56
Laredo Bucks	66	24	34	8	194	228	56

x – Qualified for playoffs; y – Won division; z – Won regular season league title After games of March 27, 2011.

== Awards and records ==
=== Awards ===
Regular Season
Player	Award	Awarded
Neil Trimm	CHL Oakley Third Star of the Month (October)	November 5, 2010
Neil Trimm	Oakley CHL Player of the Week	November 8, 2010
Torrie Jung	Oakley CHL Goaltender of the Week	November 9, 2010
Jeff Bes	Oakley CHL Player of the Week	February 7, 2011

=== Milestones ===
Regular Season
Player	Milestone	Reached
Jeff Bes	1,000th Career Professional Point	November 5, 2010
Matt Robinson	200th Career Professional Game	November 5, 2010

== Transactions ==
The Bucks have been involved in the following transactions during the 2010–11 season.

Trades
November 3, 2010	To Texas Brahmas: Todd Griffith	To Laredo: Jeff Hazelwood
November 8, 2010	To Wichita Thunder: Matt Robinson	To Laredo: Future Considerations

== Final roster ==
No.	Nat	Player	Pos	S/G	Age	Acquired	Birthplace	Contract
10	(United States)	Ryan Bennett	RW	R	43	2010	Glens Falls, New York	Bucks
32	(United States)	Hans Benson	RW	R	41	2010	Menlo Park, California	Bucks
11	(Canada)	Jeff Bes	C	L	51	2003	Tillsonburg, Ontario	Bucks
24	(Canada)	Aaron Boogaard	RW	R	38	2010	Regina, Saskatchewan	Bucks
2	(United States)	B.J. Crum	D		41	2010	Hampden, Massachusetts	Bucks
6	(France)	Benjamin Dieudé-Fauvel	D	L	38	2009	Bordeaux, France	Bucks
29	(Canada)	Serge Dube	D	L	45	2003	Sudbury, Ontario	Bucks
20	(Canada)	Reid Edmondson	F	L	36	2010	Richmond, British Columbia	Bucks
26	(United States)	Jeff Hazelwood	F		39	2010	Dublin, California	Bucks
31	(Canada)	Torrie Jung	G	L	36	2010	Nanaimo, British Columbia	Bucks
21	(Hungary)	Daniel Koger	F		35	2010	Székesfehérvár, Hungary	Bucks
15	(Canada)	Chris Korchinski	C	L	39	2010	Rama, Saskatchewan	Bucks
7	(Canada)	Ryan Lehr	D	R	38	2009	Eastern Passage, Nova Scotia	Bucks
42	(Canada)	Brian Matte	LW	L	36	2010	Prince George, British Columbia	Bucks
27	(Canada)	Jarred Mohr	D	L	40	2009	Regina, Saskatchewan	Bucks
4	(Canada)	Chris Pontes	D	R	35	2010	Sudbury, Ontario	Bucks
71	(Canada)	Adam Rivet	D	L	44	2005	Fort Erie, Ontario	Bucks
51	(Canada)	Joe Scali	LW	L	38	2010	Coquitlam, British Columbia	Bucks
18	(Canada)	Darryl Smith	C	L	38	2008	St. Catharines, Ontario	Bucks
19	(Canada)	Justin Styffe	F		40	2009	Okanagan Falls, British Columbia	Bucks
9	(Canada)	Neil Trimm	F	R	42	2009	Westmeath, Ontario	Bucks

== See also ==
- 2010–11 CHL season
