= 2000 Royal Bank Cup =

Tournament details
- Venue(s): Thickwood Heights Community Centre in Fort McMurray, Alberta
- Dates: May 5, 2000 – May 14, 2000
- Teams: 5

Final positions
- Champions: Fort McMurray Oil Barons (1st title)
- Runners-up: Rayside-Balfour Sabrecats
- Third place: Chilliwack Chiefs
- Fourth place: Battlefords North Stars

Tournament statistics
- Games played: 14
- Scoring leader: Serge Dube (Rayside-Balfour)

Awards
- MVP: Serge Dube (Rayside-Balfour)

The 2000 Royal Bank Cup was the 30th Junior "A" 2000 ice hockey National Championship for the Canadian Junior A Hockey League.

The Royal Bank Cup was competed for by the winners of the Doyle Cup, Anavet Cup, Dudley Hewitt Cup, and Fred Page Cup and a host city.

The tournament was hosted by the Fort McMurray Oil Barons and Fort McMurray, Alberta.

== The Playoffs ==
=== Round Robin ===
Pos	League (Ticket)	Team	Pld	W	L	GF	GA	GD	Qualification
1	AJHL (Host)	Fort McMurray Oil Barons	4	3	1	14	10	+4	Semi-final
2	NOJHL (Dudley Hewitt Cup)	Rayside-Balfour Sabrecats	4	3	1	20	17	+3	Semi-final
3	BCHL (Doyle Cup)	Chilliwack Chiefs	4	2	2	18	16	+2	Semi-final
4	SJHL (Anavet Cup)	Battlefords North Stars	4	2	2	10	13	−3	Semi-final
5	CJHL (Fred Page Cup)	Cornwall Colts	4	0	4	11	17	−6	

==== Results ====
Battlefords North Stars defeat Fort McMurray Oil Barons 2-1
Rayside-Balfour Sabrecats defeat Chilliwack Chiefs 8-7 in Double Overtime
Fort McMurray Oil Barons defeat Cornwall Colts 5-2
Rayside-Balfour Sabrecats defeat Battlefords North Stars 4-2
Chilliwack Chiefs defeat Cornwall Colts 3-2
Fort McMurray Oil Barons defeat Rayside-Balfour Sabrecats 4-3
Battlefords North Stars defeat Cornwall Colts 4-3 in Overtime
Fort McMurray Oil Barons defeat Chilliwack Chiefs 4-3
Rayside-Balfour Sabrecats defeat Cornwall Colts 5-4
Chilliwack Chiefs defeat Battlefords North Stars 5-2

=== Semi-finals and Final ===
Semi-finals
1	Fort McMurray Oil Barons	5
4	Battlefords North Stars	2
2	Rayside-Balfour Sabrecats	2
3	Chilliwack Chiefs	1

Royal Bank Cup Finals
1	Fort McMurray Oil Barons	2
2	Rayside-Balfour Sabrecats	1

==== Bronze Medal Game ====
Chilliwack Chiefs defeat Battlefords North Stars 3-2 in Double Overtime

== Awards ==
Most Valuable Player: Serge Dube (Rayside-Balfour Sabrecats)
Top Scorer: Serge Dube (Rayside-Balfour Sabrecats) and Kevin Estrada (Chilliwack Chiefs)
Most Sportsmanlike Player: Craig Strain (Fort McMurray Oil Barons)
Top Goalie: Steven Nelson (North Battleford North Stars)
Top Forward: Colin Murphy (Fort McMurray Oil Barons)
Top Defenceman: Troy Turyk (Rayside-Balfour Sabrecats)

== Roll of League Champions ==
AJHL: Fort McMurray Oil Barons
BCHL: Chilliwack Chiefs
CJHL: Cornwall Colts
MJHL: OCN Blizzard
MJAHL: Halifax Oland Exports
NOJHL: Rayside-Balfour Sabrecats
OPJHL: Brampton Capitals
QJAAAHL: Coaticook Frontaliers
SJHL: North Battleford North Stars

== See also ==
- Canadian Junior A Hockey League
- Royal Bank Cup
- Anavet Cup
- Doyle Cup
- Dudley Hewitt Cup
- Fred Page Cup
