= 2010–11 Mississippi RiverKings season =

American ice hockey club season

2010–11 Mississippi RiverKings
- Conference: Berry
- 2010–11 record: 30-31-5
- Home record: 19-12-2
- Road record: 11-19-3
- Goals for: 199
- Goals against: 229

Team information
- Coach: Kevin Kaminski (Oct-Dec); Paul Gardner (Dec-present)
- Arena: DeSoto Civic Center
- Average attendance: 3,235

Team leaders
- Goals: Matt Summers (28)
- Assists: Nathan Lutz (38)
- Points: Chris Richards (54)
- Penalty minutes: Russell Smith (193)
- Plus/minus: Chris Auger (+9)
- Wins: Alexander Pechurskiy (17)
- Goals against average: Alexander Pechurskiy (3.04)

The 2010–11 Mississippi RiverKings season was the 19th season of the Central Hockey League (CHL) franchise in Southaven, Mississippi.

== Regular season ==
After an 11-11-1 start, the RiverKings changed coaches on December 14, 2010, head coach and director of hockey operations Kevin Kaminski was released from his position and was replaced by Paul Gardner.

=== Conference standings ===
Berry Conference	GP	W	L	OTL	GF	GA	Pts
z-Allen Americans	66	47	16	3	271	211	97
x-Bossier-Shreveport Mudbugs	66	37	26	3	229	193	77
x-Tulsa Oilers	66	35	25	6	242	234	76
x-Texas Brahmas	66	34	27	5	227	228	73
x-Odessa Jackalopes	66	31	28	7	241	238	69
x-Mississippi RiverKings	66	30	31	5	199	229	65
x-Arizona Sundogs	66	25	31	10	204	253	60
x-Rio Grande Valley Killer Bees	66	25	35	6	194	232	56
Laredo Bucks	66	24	34	8	194	228	56

x – Qualified for playoffs; y – Won division; z – Won regular season league title After games of March 27, 2011.

== Awards and records ==
=== Awards ===
Regular Season
Player	Award	Awarded
Matt Summers	Oakley CHL Player of the Week	December 6, 2010

=== Milestones ===
Regular Season
Player	Milestone	Reached

== Transactions ==
The RiverKings have been involved in the following transactions during the 2010–11 season.

Trades
November 23, 2010	To Quad City Mallards: Future Considerations	To Mississippi: Patrik Levesque

== Final roster ==
No.	Nat	Player	Pos	S/G	Age	Acquired	Birthplace
9	(Canada)	Matt Boyd	F	L	40	2010	St. Albert, Alberta
16	(Canada)	Louis Dumont	F	R	53	2006	Calgary, Alberta
20	(United States)	R.G. Flath	F	R	41	2010	Park City, Utah
24	(Canada)	Andrew Lackner	D	L	42	2008	Elmira, Ontario
55	(Canada)	Derek Landmesser	D	R	51	2000	Thunder Bay, Ontario
44	(Canada)	Nathan Lutz	D	L	48	2010	Whitehorse, Yukon
7	(Canada)	Dane Marshall	D	L	41	2010	Mistatim, Saskatchewan
46	(Slovakia)	Milan Maslonka	D	L	39	2010	Zvolen, Slovakia
18	(Canada)	Matt Miller	F	R	42	2010	Sioux Lookout, Ontario
83	(Canada)	Chris Richards	F	R	50	2010	Cornwall, Ontario
22	(Canada)	Tyler Sheldrake	D	R	36	2010	Dunnville, Ontario
5	(United States)	Russell Smith	D	L	42	2010	Annapolis, Maryland
35	(United States)	Larry Sterling	G		43	2010	Lake Orion, Michigan
87	(Canada)	Darrell Stoddard	F	R	44	2005	Red Deer, Alberta
19	(United States)	Matt Summers	F	R	39	2008	Savage, Minnesota

== See also ==
- 2010–11 CHL season
