= USA Central Hockey League =

Junior ice hockey league based in Texas

- Sport: Ice hockey
- Founded: 2018
- Folded: 2018
- CEO: Bill Davidson
- No. of teams: 4
- Country: United States
- Website: www.USACHL.com

The USA Central Hockey League (USACHL) was a junior ice hockey league based in Texas. The league was not sanctioned by any outside hockey governing body, but was structured as a "free-to-play" junior league similar to USA Hockey's Tier I and Tier II as opposed to the "pay-to-play" Tier III leagues.

== History ==
The league announced its formation in March 2018, founded by former El Paso Buzzards owner Bill Davidson and former Western Professional Hockey League founder Rick Kozuback. The league named former Salmon Arm Silverbacks general manager Troy Mick as its first president. The USACHL announced it was planning a sixty-game regular season schedule that lasts from October until March.

The league was initially planned to consist of six teams, targeting cities associated with the defunct Central Hockey League (CHL), for its inaugural 2018–19 season featuring players under twenty-years-old. The first two teams were announced in Laredo and Hidalgo, Texas, both teams sharing branding with former CHL teams, the Laredo Bucks and Rio Grande Valley Killer Bees. The third announced was in Wichita Falls, Texas, and were named the Wichita Falls Force through a naming contest. Wichita Falls had gone without a hockey team for one season after the North American Hockey League's Wichita Falls Wildcats ceased operations in 2017. However, with the announced October season start date approaching, the league announced at the end of August a fourth and final 2018–19 team called the Texas Lawmen to be based in McAllen, Texas. The league stated it was purchasing the Frio Grande Valley Ice Center as the Lawmen's home arena and would renovate the building.

The league played its first game on October 26, 2018, when the Rio Grande Valley Killer Bees defeated the Laredo Bucks. After the opening week, several games were postponed due to rink availability or arena issues. Within the first month of play, USACHL president Troy Mick, along with the original four original head coaches all departed from the league. The sale of the Frio Grande Valley Ice Center fell through, forcing the team to use the nearby Killer Bees home venue for scheduled home games. The Lawmen's first few games also did not allow spectators in the arena as there was not enough time for the arena to advertise the game in order to sell tickets.

On November 14, 2018, all league operated social media sites were shut down or deleted. The league stated they believed a disgruntled or unpaid employee had taken over the sites and the league was working on reclaiming them. By November 17, the social media sites had still not been reclaimed and were eventually renamed, with the league creating new Twitter accounts for the USACHL and for the affected teams. During the November 23 game of the Bucks at the Wichita Falls Force, the team issued handouts to the attendees continuing to blame the unpaid employee for taking the social media sites, but stated the league is continuing operations regardless.

By the November 23 game between the Killer Bees and Lawmen, the teams played a three-on-three showcase due to lack of players. The following week on November 29, the Lawmen were down to only three players, the second coaching staff all resigned, and the team ceased operations. On November 30, the Wichita Falls home game against the Killer Bees was cancelled citing bus scheduling issues. However, the city of Wichita Falls announced they had actually locked out the Force from the arena due to late payments and the December 1 and 2 games were also cancelled. On December 1, the Wichita Falls billet families for the players announced the rest of the players were leaving and the Force had folded. On December 3, parents of players for the Laredo Bucks announced their kids were leaving the team.

On December 7, the league cancelled the remainder of the season. The league management later issued a press release claiming "business interference" as the reason for the league's suspension and that the league would return in the 2019–20 season, which did not happen.

== Teams ==
Team	Location	Arena	Head coaches
Laredo Bucks	Laredo, Texas	Sames Auto Arena	Wayne Smith (until end of October); Jarred Mohr (October–December)
Rio Grande Valley Killer Bees	Hidalgo, Texas	State Farm Hidalgo Arena	John Ollson (preseason); Kyle Christensen (co-coach); Terry Christensen (co-coach)
Texas Lawmen	McAllen, Texas; Hidalgo, Texas	Frio Grande Valley Ice Center; State Farm Hidalgo Arena	Ryan Egan (until mid-November); Matt Barth (until November 29)
Wichita Falls Force	Wichita Falls, Texas	Kay Yeager Coliseum	Misko Antisin (preseason); Jesse Davis (until December 1)
