= Brent Cullaton =

Canadian ice hockey player

- Born: November 12, 1974 (age 51) Petawawa, Ontario, Canada
- Height: 6 ft 0 in (183 cm)
- Weight: 220 lb (100 kg; 15 st 10 lb)
- Position: Forward
- Shot: Left
- Played for: Fort Worth Brahmas; Kansas City Blades; San Antonio Dragons; Orlando Solar Bears; Hamilton Bulldogs; London Knights; Frankfurt Lions; San Antonio Rampage; Laredo Bucks
- NHL draft: Undrafted
- Playing career: 1996–2011; 2013

Brent Cullaton (born November 12, 1974) is a Canadian retired professional ice hockey player. He is also a three-time Central Hockey League all-star. During his final professional seasons in the CHL, Cullaton also served as the general manager and head coach for the Boulder Junior Bison of the Western States Hockey League until 2012.

With his most successful years in the Central Hockey League with the Rocky Mountain Rage, Cullaton remained in Colorado as his primary residence. Cullaton joined the newly established Denver Cutthroats of the CHL as the assistant general manager and director of hockey operations.

With the intention to skate in the Denver Cutthroats celebrity charity hockey game at the Denver Coliseum, Cullaton came out of retirement and signed a 5-game playing contract with the short-handed Cutthroats on February 5, 2013.

== Career statistics ==
			Regular season					Playoffs
Season	Team	League	GP	G	A	Pts	PIM	GP	G	A	Pts	PIM
1995–96	Miami University (Ohio)	CCHA	10	10	1	11	13	—	—	—	—	—
1996–97	Kansas City Blades	IHL	67	19	14	33	32	3	0	1	1	0
1996–97	Mobile Mysticks	ECHL	4	1	4	5	16	—	—	—	—	—
1997–98	Peoria Rivermen	ECHL	7	8	8	16	19	3	1	2	3	2
1997–98	Kansas City Blades	IHL	30	5	9	14	10	—	—	—	—	—
1997–98	San Antonio Dragons	IHL	23	2	8	10	24	—	—	—	—	—
1998–99	Tallahassee Tiger Sharks	ECHL	59	23	38	61	72	—	—	—	—	—
1998–99	Orlando Solar Bears	IHL	6	1	2	3	7	—	—	—	—	—
1999–00	Hamilton Bulldogs	AHL	3	3	3	6	0	—	—	—	—	—
1999–00	London Knights	BISL	4	1	1	2	2	—	—	—	—	—
1999–00	Tallahassee Tiger Sharks	ECHL	31	10	14	24	19	—	—	—	—	—
1999–00	Florida Everblades	ECHL	32	20	10	30	16	4	1	1	2	4
2000–01	Tallahassee Tiger Sharks	ECHL	54	27	47	74	56	—	—	—	—	—
2001–02	Frankfurt Lions	DEL	42	14	9	23	44	—	—	—	—	—
2001–02	Fort Worth Brahmas	CHL	26	7	19	26	8	4	1	2	3	6
2002–03	Columbus Cottonmouths	ECHL	72	18	44	62	110	—	—	—	—	—
2003–04	Laredo Bucks	CHL	39	25	50	75	14	16	4	16	20	4
2003–04	San Antonio Rampage	AHL	31	5	11	16	8	—	—	—	—	—
2004–05	Laredo Bucks	CHL	43	21	29	50	36	16	4	10	14	14
2004–05	San Antonio Rampage	AHL	16	2	1	3	4	—	—	—	—	—
2005–06	Laredo Bucks	CHL	38	20	32	52	26	16	4	20	24	20
2005–06	San Antonio Rampage	AHL	22	3	2	5	8	—	—	—	—	—
2006–07	Elmira Jackals	UHL	47	18	38	56	50	—	—	—	—	—
2006–07	Kalamazoo Wings	UHL	4	0	0	0	2	—	—	—	—	—
2007–08	Rocky Mountain Rage	CHL	57	21	71	92	38	—	—	—	—	—
2008–09	Rocky Mountain Rage	CHL	44	15	41	56	34	—	—	—	—	—
2008–09	Laredo Bucks	CHL	20	5	11	16	14	6	0	5	5	0
2009–10	Laredo Bucks	CHL	3	2	1	3	4	5	3	1	4	4
2010–11	Wichita Thunder	CHL	10	0	10	10	6	5	0	5	5	0
2012–13	Denver Cutthroats	CHL	4	1	1	2	2	—	—	—	—	—
AHL totals			72	13	17	30	20	—	—	—	—	—
ECHL totals			259	107	165	272	308	7	2	3	5	6
CHL totals			279	117	257	374	180	68	16	59	75	48

== Awards ==
CHL

- Ray Miron President's Cup - 2003–04, 2005–06

Western States Hockey League

- 2009–10 WSHL Mid West Division Champions
