= Bart Hull =

Canadian football player, minor league hockey player (born 1969)

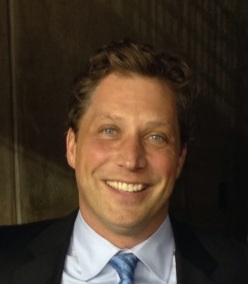

Profile
- Position: Running back

Personal information
- Born: February 13, 1969 (age 57); Chicago, Illinois, U.S.
- Listed height: 5 ft 11 in (1.80 m)
- Listed weight: 220 lb (100 kg)

Career information
- College: Boise State

Career history

Playing
- 1991: Ottawa Rough Riders
- 1994: Saskatchewan Roughriders

Operations
- 2013: St. Charles Chill - VP Business Ops

Bart Hull (born February 13, 1969) is a former running back in the Canadian Football League. He is the son of famed Canadian hockey legend Bobby Hull, nephew of Dennis Hull and younger brother of Brett Hull. Hull had a prolific high school athletic career at Vancouver College High School in Vancouver, B.C. before attending Boise State on an athletic scholarship.

A graduate of Boise State University, Hull was drafted by the BC Lions but was traded to the Ottawa Rough Riders. He played three games with them in 1991. Unfortunately, an ACL injury cut his season short. He played one more CFL season, in 1994, suiting up with the Saskatchewan Roughriders for two more games.

After his football days, Hull played a bit of minor league hockey, taking the ice for six games over three seasons (1997–2000) with the Idaho Steelheads of the WCHL, suiting up when the team was shorthanded (his only statistics being four penalty minutes.) He also briefly played indoor football with the Idaho Stallions of the IPFL and one game in 1995 with the Los Angeles Blades of Roller Hockey International. Hull was named Vice President of Business Development for the minor league St. Charles Chill for its final season of operation in 2013–14.

Hull moved to Dallas, Texas where he has lived for the past several years, and ran a successful construction company. He married Vandara Sareth Kheao, who gave birth to a daughter, Brett Madison. He also has a son named Brenden.
