= 2010–11 Texas Brahmas season =

2010–11 Texas Brahmas
- League: 9th CHL
- Conference: 4th Berry
- 2010–11 record: 34-27-5
- Home record: 20-10-3
- Road record: 14-17-2
- Goals for: 227
- Goals against: 228

Team information
- General manager: Mike Barack
- Coach: Dan Wildfong
- Assistant coach: Ron Vogel
- Arena: NYTEX Sports Centre
- Average attendance: 2,188

Team leaders
- Goals: Chad Woollard (46)
- Assists: Greg Hogeboom (55)
- Points: Chad Woollard; Greg Hogeboom (92)
- Penalty minutes: Mick Lawrence (122)
- Plus/minus: Greg Hogeboom; Jason Krischuk (+16)
- Wins: Wayne Savage (21)
- Goals against average: Wayne Savage (3.04)

The 2010–11 Texas Brahmas season was the 10th season of the Central Hockey League franchise in North Richland Hills, Texas.

== Regular season ==
=== Conference standings ===
Berry Conference	GP	W	L	OTL	GF	GA	Pts
z-Allen Americans	66	47	16	3	271	211	97
x-Bossier-Shreveport Mudbugs	66	37	26	3	229	193	77
x-Tulsa Oilers	66	35	25	6	242	234	76
x-Texas Brahmas	66	34	27	5	227	228	73
x-Odessa Jackalopes	66	31	28	7	241	238	69
x-Mississippi RiverKings	66	30	31	5	199	229	65
x-Arizona Sundogs	66	25	31	10	204	253	60
x-Rio Grande Valley Killer Bees	66	25	35	6	194	232	56
Laredo Bucks	66	24	34	8	194	228	56

x – Qualified for playoffs; y – Won division; z – Won regular season league title After games of March 27, 2011.

== Awards and records ==
=== Awards ===
Regular Season
Player	Award	Awarded
Wayne Savage	CHL All-Rookie Team	March 18, 2011

=== Milestones ===
Regular Season
Player	Milestone	Reached

== Transactions ==
The Brahmas have been involved in the following transactions during the 2010–11 season.

Trades

November 3, 2010	To Laredo Bucks: Jeff Hazelwood	To Texas: Todd Griffith

== See also ==
- 2010–11 CHL season
