= Jeff Christian =

Canadian ice hockey player (born 1970)

- Born: July 30, 1970 (age 55) Burlington, Ontario, Canada
- Height: 6 ft 2 in (188 cm)
- Weight: 225 lb (102 kg; 16 st 1 lb)
- Position: Left wing
- Shot: Left
- Played for: NHL; New Jersey Devils; Pittsburgh Penguins; Phoenix Coyotes; IHL; Cincinnati Cyclones; Cleveland Lumberjacks; Las Vegas Thunder; Houston Aeros; AHL; Utica Devils; Albany River Rats; Cleveland Barons; Rockford IceHogs; CHL; Youngstown Steelhounds; Tulsa Oilers; Missouri Mavericks; Mississippi RiverKings; Evansville IceMen; DEL; Krefeld Pinguine; DEG Metro Stars; EIHL; Sheffield Steelers
- NHL draft: 23rd overall, 1988; New Jersey Devils
- Playing career: 1990–2011

Jeffrey Christian (born July 30, 1970) is a Canadian former professional ice hockey forward who played 18 games in the National Hockey League for the New Jersey Devils, Pittsburgh Penguins and the Phoenix Coyotes, before playing professionally in the North American minor leagues and Europe for over two decades.

== Playing career ==
Christian was drafted 23rd overall by the New Jersey Devils in the 1988 NHL entry draft and attended six NHL training camps with the Devils. Christian played two games for New Jersey during the 1991–92 season, scoring no points.

Christian played in the American Hockey League (AHL) with the Utica Devils and the Albany River Rats. After four full seasons with the Devils organization, Christian signed a three-year contract with the Pittsburgh Penguins.

He appeared in 15 games for the Penguins over three seasons, scoring two goals and two assists during the 1996–97 season. Primarily playing with the Cleveland Lumberjacks, Christian scored 40 goals and 40 assists in 66 games during the 1996–97 International Hockey League (IHL) season.

Unable to secure another NHL contract, Christian played in Europe, spending four seasons in the Deutsche Eishockey Liga with the Krefeld Pinguine, DEG Metro Stars and Hannover Scorpions, plus one season with the Sheffield Steelers of the Elite Ice Hockey League.

Christian returned to North America in 2005 joining the Central Hockey League's Youngstown Steelhounds and later, the Tulsa Oilers.

After two seasons with the Oilers, he became the first player signed by the expansion Missouri Mavericks for the 2009–10 season. He later served as an assistant coach for the Mavericks.

On September 11, 2010, Christian signed with the Mississippi RiverKings, based in Southaven, Mississippi. His decision to sign with the team was due to the community being in close proximity to Memphis, Tennessee, where his daughter was being treated for cancer at St. Jude Children's Research Hospital. On February 22, 2011, the RiverKings waived Christian, but he was claimed on waivers the next day by the Evansville IceMen. In his final game, Christian had an assist and scored the game-winning goal in a shoot-out.

Christian is among a handful of players to play over 1400 career professional games (1406) while scoring over 500 goals (574), 700 assists (792) and having over 3300 penalty minutes (3370).

== Coaching and consulting career ==
Christian was hired as an assistant coach for the Wheeling Nailers of the ECHL in January 2016. After a two-year stint as the Nailers' head coach, his contract was not renewed after not making the Kelly Cup playoffs in either season. It was reported that he was harassing female fans.

Christian was a consultant with Villach of the Austrian Hockey League (EBEL).

== Personal and philanthropic life ==
Born in Burlington, Ontario, Christian is the son of longtime Hamilton Tiger-Cats wide receiver Gord Christian and was raised in Hamilton, Ontario

Christian and his wife have two daughters, losing their oldest one to cancer on January 24, 2013, after a three-year fight, after being diagnosed with Pediatric Adrenal cortical Carcinoma.

Christian and his family were the subject of a feature article in Sports Net Magazine, for their work with the Team Ryan Charitable Foundation, in order of their late daughter.

== Awards and accolades ==
- 1990-91: Leading Rookie Scorer, Utica Devils (AHL)
- 1990-91: Rookie Of The Year, Utica Devils (AHL)
- 1994-95: Community Service Award, Cleveland Lumberjacks (IHL)
- 1996-97: Team MVP, Cleveland Lumberjacks (IHL)
- 1998-99: John Cullen Award (Sportsmanship), Houston Aeros (IHL)
- 1998-99: Turner Cup Champion, Houston Aeros (IHL)
- 1999-00: Community Service Award, Cleveland Lumberjacks (IHL)
- 2005-06: First Team All-Star, Central Hockey League
- 2005-06: Most Valuable Player runner-up, Central Hockey League
- 2005-06; 2006-07: Scored the game-winning goal in back-to-back CHL All-Star Games. Christian's sticks from those respective games are currently in the Hockey Hall Of Fame archives.
- 2006-07: Leading Scorer, Central Hockey League
- 2006-07: First-Team All Star, Central Hockey League
- 2006-07: League MVP, Central Hockey League

Christian wore a Captain's letter on his jersey 11 seasons and played in 5 All Star Games.

== Career statistics ==
			Regular Season					Playoffs
Season	Team	League	GP	G	A	Pts	PIM	GP	G	A	Pts	PIM
1987–88	London Knights	OHL	64	15	29	44	154	9	1	5	6	27
1988–89	London Knights	OHL	60	27	31	58	216	20	3	4	7	56
1989–90	London Knights	OHL	18	14	7	21	64	—	—	—	—	—
1989–90	Owen Sound Platers	OHL	37	19	26	45	145	10	6	7	13	43
1990–91	Utica Devils	AHL	80	24	42	66	165	—	—	—	—	—
1991–92	Utica Devils	AHL	76	27	24	51	198	4	0	0	0	16
1991–92	New Jersey Devils	NHL	2	0	0	0	2	—	—	—	—	—
1992–93	Cincinnati Cyclones	IHL	36	5	12	17	113	—	—	—	—	—
1992–93	Utica Devils	AHL	22	4	6	10	39	—	—	—	—	—
1992–93	Hamilton Canucks	AHL	11	2	5	7	35	—	—	—	—	—
1993–94	Albany River Rats	AHL	76	34	43	77	227	5	1	2	3	19
1994–95	Pittsburgh Penguins	NHL	1	0	0	0	0	—	—	—	—	—
1994–95	Cleveland Lumberjacks	IHL	56	13	24	37	126	2	0	1	1	8
1995–96	Pittsburgh Penguins	NHL	3	0	0	0	2	—	—	—	—	—
1995–96	Cleveland Lumberjacks	IHL	66	23	32	55	131	3	0	1	1	8
1996–97	Pittsburgh Penguins	NHL	11	2	2	4	13	—	—	—	—	—
1996–97	Cleveland Lumberjacks	IHL	69	40	40	80	262	12	6	8	14	44
1997–98	Phoenix Coyotes	NHL	1	0	0	0	0	—	—	—	—	—
1997–98	Las Vegas Thunder	IHL	30	12	15	27	90	4	2	2	4	20
1998–99	Houston Aeros	IHL	80	45	41	86	252	18	4	12	16	32
1999–00	Cleveland Lumberjacks	IHL	77	29	35	64	202	9	1	4	5	20
2000–01	Krefeld Pinguine	DEL	51	17	22	39	205	—	—	—	—	—
2001–02	Krefeld Pinguine	DEL	53	31	18	49	116	3	2	0	2	12
2002–03	DEG Metro Stars	DEL	42	12	15	27	93	5	1	3	4	16
2003–04	Hannover Scorpions	DEL	50	11	15	26	94	—	—	—	—	—
2004–05	Sheffield Steelers	EIHL	52	19	30	49	139	—	—	—	—	—
2005–06	Youngstown Steelhounds	CHL	64	55	52	107	126	—	—	—	—	—
2005–06	Cleveland Barons	AHL	3	0	1	1	6	—	—	—	—	—
2006–07	Youngstown Steelhounds	CHL	61	38	78	116	125	6	5	5	10	17
2007–08	Tulsa Oilers	CHL	64	24	59	83	107	—	—	—	—	—
2008–09	Tulsa Oilers	CHL	56	27	49	76	92	—	—	—	—	—
2008–09	Rockford IceHogs	AHL	5	1	0	1	4	—	—	—	—	—
2009–10	Missouri Mavericks	CHL	55	29	49	78	110	7	1	8	9	6
2010–11	Mississippi RiverKings	CHL	52	14	25	39	42	—	—	—	—	—
2010–11	Evansville IceMen	CHL	15	8	11	19	20	—	—	—	—	—
NHL totals			18	2	2	4	17	—	—	—	—	—
