= Youngstown SteelHounds =

- City: Youngstown, Ohio
- Operated: 2005–2008
- Home arena: Covelli Centre
- Colors: Navy blue, steel gray, rust
- Owner: Herb Washington
- Media: ESPN Radio 1240 AM

Franchise history
- 2005–2008: Youngstown SteelHounds

The Youngstown SteelHounds was a professional ice hockey team which participated in the Central Hockey League (CHL) from the 2005–2006 season through the 2007–2008 season. The team was affiliated with the Columbus Blue Jackets of the NHL and the Syracuse Crunch of the AHL. The team played its home games at the Covelli Centre in Youngstown, Ohio.

The SteelHounds franchise was owned by Herb Washington. The last to hold the posts of General Manager and Head Coach were Joe Gregory and Kevin Kaminski. After being expelled from the CHL following the 2007–2008 season, the team did not participate as a member of any league in 2008–2009.

Per a Youngstown Vindicator report, discussions were held with the ECHL about a potential return for professional hockey in Youngstown, however, in 2009 the Mahoning Valley Phantoms, a Junior A hockey team, moved from the NAHL to the USHL, the premier junior league in the United States, and are playing their entire home slate at the Covelli Centre under a new name, the Youngstown Phantoms.

== Franchise history ==
The SteelHounds took their name from the U.S. steel industry.

The franchise joined the CHL in 2005 as an expansion team for the 2005–06 season, playing in the Northeast Division of the CHL, with the closest team to Youngstown being the Mississippi RiverKings.

The SteelHounds won their first home game at the Chevrolet Centre on November 4, 2005, when they defeated the Oklahoma City Blazers 4–3. They went on to finish second in the four-team Northeast Division with a 24–35 record. The SteelHounds failed to make the playoffs in their first season.

The 2006–07 season was a better one for the SteelHounds, as the team finished with 34 wins, 20 losses and 10 overtime losses. The SteelHounds made the playoffs for the first time in franchise history but lost in the first round to the Colorado Eagles.

The SteelHounds' best record in their short franchise history came in the 2007–08 season with 39 wins, 20 losses and 5 overtime losses. The team finished second in the Northeast Division and qualified for the playoffs for the second straight year, but lost again to the Colorado Eagles. After being kicked out of the CHL following the 2007–08 season, management considered joining the ECHL or the IHL.

== Youngstown out of the CHL ==
As of June 2, 2008, the CHL announced that the SteelHounds franchise would not be playing in the league. The CHL cited the reason for termination being non-payment of league dues. The SteelHounds and the league have had a dispute related to travel expenses since the franchise began in 2006.

The SteelHounds explored joining the IHL or ECHL for the 2008–09 or 2009–10 season, as both leagues had teams located in the Great Lakes and Mid-Atlantic regions, making them a better fit for the SteelHounds than the CHL (most of whose teams are in the Southern Plains and Southwest regions of the United States). The team's ownership engaged in talks with the IHL, and in previous seasons the SteelHounds have had exhibition games against ECHL teams.

After being kicked out of the league, and failing to quickly find a new league to play in for the upcoming 2008–2009 season, there was a mass exodus of top officials in the SteelHounds organization. On June 23, 2008 General Manager Joe Gregory resigned his position, and announced that he was hired as an Executive Vice President for the Norfolk Admirals of the AHL. Then, Kevin Kaminski resigned his position as head coach on July 1, 2008, after which, on July 2, 2008, the rival Mississippi RiverKings announced him as their new head coach, signed to an unheard of three-year contract.

== Team record ==
=== Head coaching records ===
Head coach	Years	Seasons	Wins	Losses	OT losses	Points	Win pct.	# Playoff appearances	Playoff wins	Playoff losses	Playoff points	Playoff win pct.
Jean LeForest	2005–2006	1	24	35	5	53	.414	0	0	0	0	.000
Kevin Kaminski	2006–2008	2	73	40	15	161	.629	2	3	8	6	.273

=== Season standings ===
Season	League	Wins	Losses	OT losses	Points	Win pct.	Result	Head coach
2005–2006	CHL	24	35	5	53	.414	2nd NE Division	Jean LeForest
2006–2007	CHL	34	20	10	78	.609	3rd NE Division	Kevin Kaminski
2007–2008	CHL	39	20	5	83	.648	2nd NE Division	Kevin Kaminski

=== Playoff record ===
Season	League	Wild-Card series	Semi-Final series	Conference Championship Series	League Championship Series
2006–2007	CHL	Colorado (L 2–4)			
2007–2008	CHL	Bye	Colorado (L 1–4)		

== Players ==
=== Team captains ===
Season	League	Player
2005–2006	CHL	Jeff Christian
2006–2007	CHL	Jeff Christian
2007–2008	CHL	Chris Richards

=== Franchise scoring leaders ===
These are the top-ten point-scorers in franchise history (*Includes post-season totals).

Note: Pos = Position; GP = Games played; G = Goals; A = Assists; Pts = Points; P/G = Points per game

Points
Player	Pos	GP	G	A	Pts	P/G
Chris Richards	C	200	88	204	292	1.46
Jeff Christian	LW	131	98	135	233	1.78
Jeff Alconbrack	D	135	22	89	111	0.82
Eric Przepiorka	F	66	26	43	69	1.05
Petr Pohl	F	56	24	41	65	1.16
Joel Irving	F	69	26	37	63	0.91
Chris Shaffer	RW	122	25	32	57	0.47
Tab Lardner	F	61	20	33	53	0.87
Mark Odut	LW	117	20	29	49	0.42
Joey Sewell	RW	29	24	24	48	1.66
Brad Patterson	C	79	14	34	48	0.61

Goals
Player	Pos	G
Jeff Christian	LW	98
Chris Richards	C	88
Eric Przepiorka	C	26
Chris Shaffer	RW	25
Jeff Alcombrack	D	22
Mark Odut	LW	20
Stephen Margeson	D	20
Shaun Landolt	LW	17
Brad Patterson	C	14
Mark Johnson	C	12
Kelly Sickavish	D	6

Assists
Player	Pos	A
Chris Richards	C	204
Jeff Christian	LW	135
Jeff Alcombrack	D	89
Eric Przepiorka	F	43
Petr Pohl	F	41
Joel Irving	F	37
Brad Patterson	C	34
Tab Lardner	F	33
Chris Shaffer	RW	32
Kurtis Dulle	D	29
Mark Odut	LW	29
