= 2010–11 Rio Grande Valley Killer Bees season =

2010–11 Rio Grande Valley Killer Bees (CHL)
- Conference: Berry
- 2010–11 record: 25-35-6
- Home record: 12-18-3
- Road record: 13-17-3
- Goals for: 194
- Goals against: 232

Team information
- General manager: Grant Buckborough
- Coach: Chris Brooks
- Assistant coach: Sean Gillam
- Captain: Zak McClellan
- Arena: State Farm Arena

Team leaders
- Goals: Tomas Klempa (23); Aaron Lewicki; Zak McClellan
- Assists: Darcy Campbell (46)
- Points: Tomas Klempa (63)
- Penalty minutes: Brett Clouthier (177)
- Plus/minus: Sean Muncy (+1)
- Wins: Juliano Pagliero (21)
- Goals against average: Juliano Pagliero (3.25)

The 2010–11 Rio Grande Valley Killer Bees season was the eighth season of the CHL franchise in Hidalgo, Texas.

== Regular season ==
=== Conference standings ===
Berry Conference	GP	W	L	OTL	GF	GA	Pts
z-Allen Americans	66	47	16	3	271	211	97
x-Bossier-Shreveport Mudbugs	66	37	26	3	229	193	77
x-Tulsa Oilers	66	35	25	6	242	234	76
x-Texas Brahmas	66	34	27	5	227	228	73
x-Odessa Jackalopes	66	31	28	7	241	238	69
x-Mississippi RiverKings	66	30	31	5	199	229	65
x-Arizona Sundogs	66	25	31	10	204	253	60
x-Rio Grande Valley Killer Bees	66	25	35	6	194	232	56
Laredo Bucks	66	24	34	8	194	228	56

x – Qualified for playoffs; y – Won division; z – Won regular season league title After games of March 27, 2011.

== Awards and records ==
=== Awards ===
Regular Season
Player	Award	Awarded
Juliano Pagliero	Oakley CHL Goaltender of the Week	November 2, 2010
Juliano Pagliero	CHL Oakley Second Star of the Month (November)	December 7, 2010
Aaron Lewicki	CHL All-Rookie Team	March 18, 2011

=== Milestones ===
Regular Season
Player	Milestone	Reached

== Transactions ==
The Killer Bees have been involved in the following transactions during the 2010–11 season.

Trades

September 1, 2010	To Wichita Thunder: Jesse Bennefield	To Rio Grande Valley: Tomas Klempa

== See also ==
- 2010–11 CHL season
