= St. Charles Chill =

- City: St. Charles, Missouri
- League: Central Hockey League
- Conference: Berry
- Founded: 2002
- Operated: 2013–2014
- Home arena: Family Arena
- Colors: Black, silver, white, ice blue
- Head coach: Jamie Rivers

Franchise history
- 2002–2012: Laredo Bucks
- 2013–2014: St. Charles Chill

The St. Charles Chill was a minor league ice hockey team and member of the Central Hockey League that began play during the 2013–14 season on October 19, 2013 as the affiliate of the National Hockey League's St. Louis Blues and the American Hockey League's Chicago Wolves. Based in St. Charles, Missouri, the Chill played its home games at the Family Arena.

The Chill was the second hockey team to call St. Charles home following the Missouri River Otters, which played in the United Hockey League from 1999 until folding in 2006.

== History ==
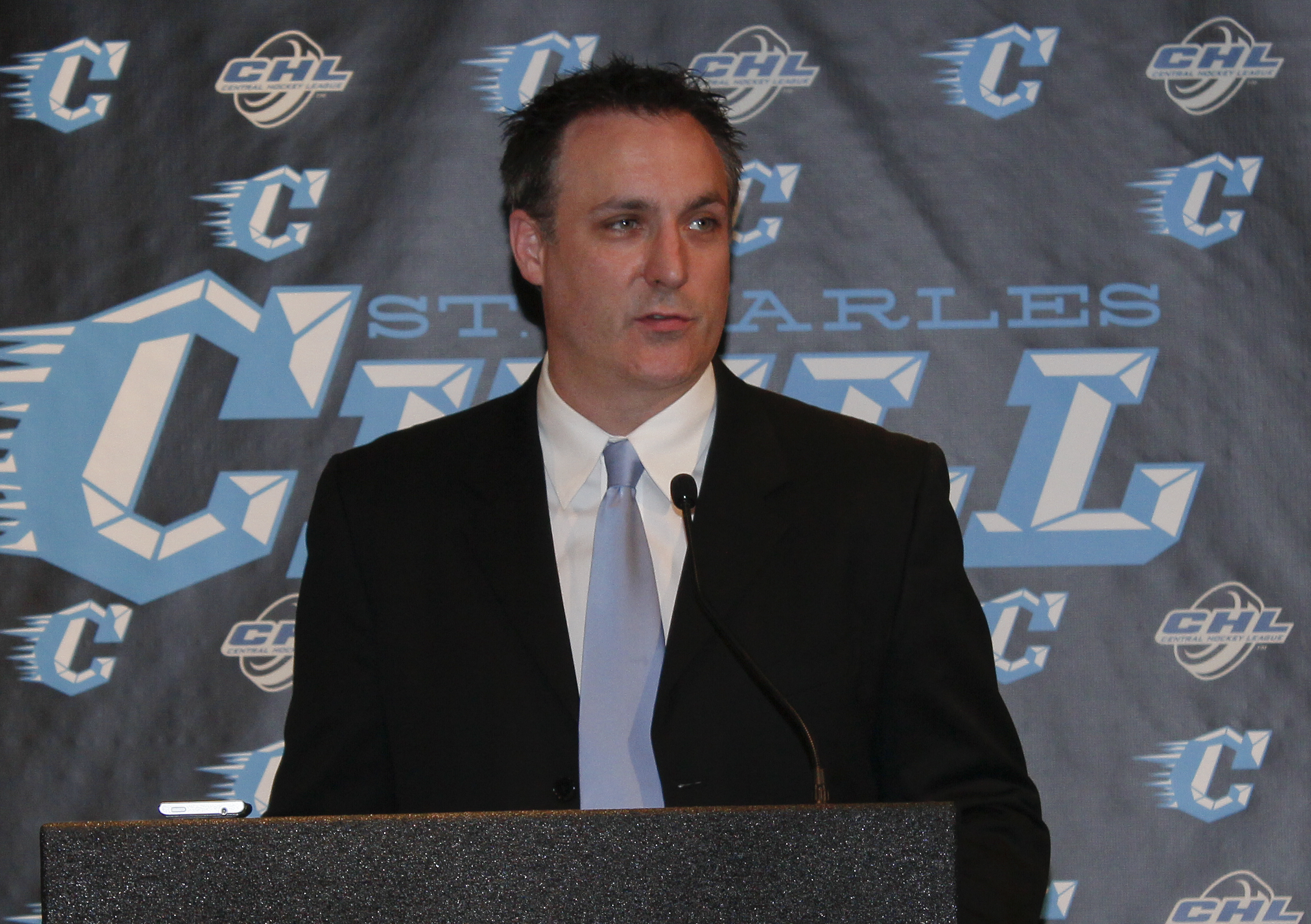
Head Coach and General Manager of the St. Charles Chill, Jamie Rivers.

On August 1, 2012, the CHL announced that the former Laredo Bucks franchise had been transferred to new ownership headed by Gustavo Hernandez, Alfonso Arguindegui and Glenn Hart, with plans to relocate the team to St. Charles, taking up the "St. Charles Chill" name.

The Chill was expected to form strong rivalries with other nearby CHL teams, in particular the Quad City Mallards, Bloomington Blaze, and in-state rivals the Missouri Mavericks.

On September 17, 2012, the Chill announced that former St. Louis Blues player Jamie Rivers would serve as the team's first head coach.

Patrick Armstrong served as the team's Executive VP, handling the day-to-day operations of the club. Bart Hull, brother of former St. Louis Blues player Brett Hull, was named Vice President of Business Operations (a title his brother holds with NHL affiliate St. Louis Blues).

On October 17, 2013, the Chill announced that it would be the CHL affiliate of the National Hockey League's St. Louis Blues and the American Hockey League's Chicago Wolves.

Tony Patricio of KPNT-FM 105.7's "The Point" served as host for the Chill's games; KFNS personality Jeff Burton as Public Address announcer; and WGNU-AM's Matt Grover as DJ.

The Chill finished last among CHL teams during its inaugural season, with only eleven wins, but managed to rank seventh in attendance with an average of 2,585 fans per game at the Family Arena. On May 2, 2014, the official website of the St. Charles Chill announced the team was ceasing operations.

== See also ==
- Missouri River Otters
- Laredo Bucks
- St. Louis Blues
