= Scott Reid (ice hockey) =

Canadian ice hockey player

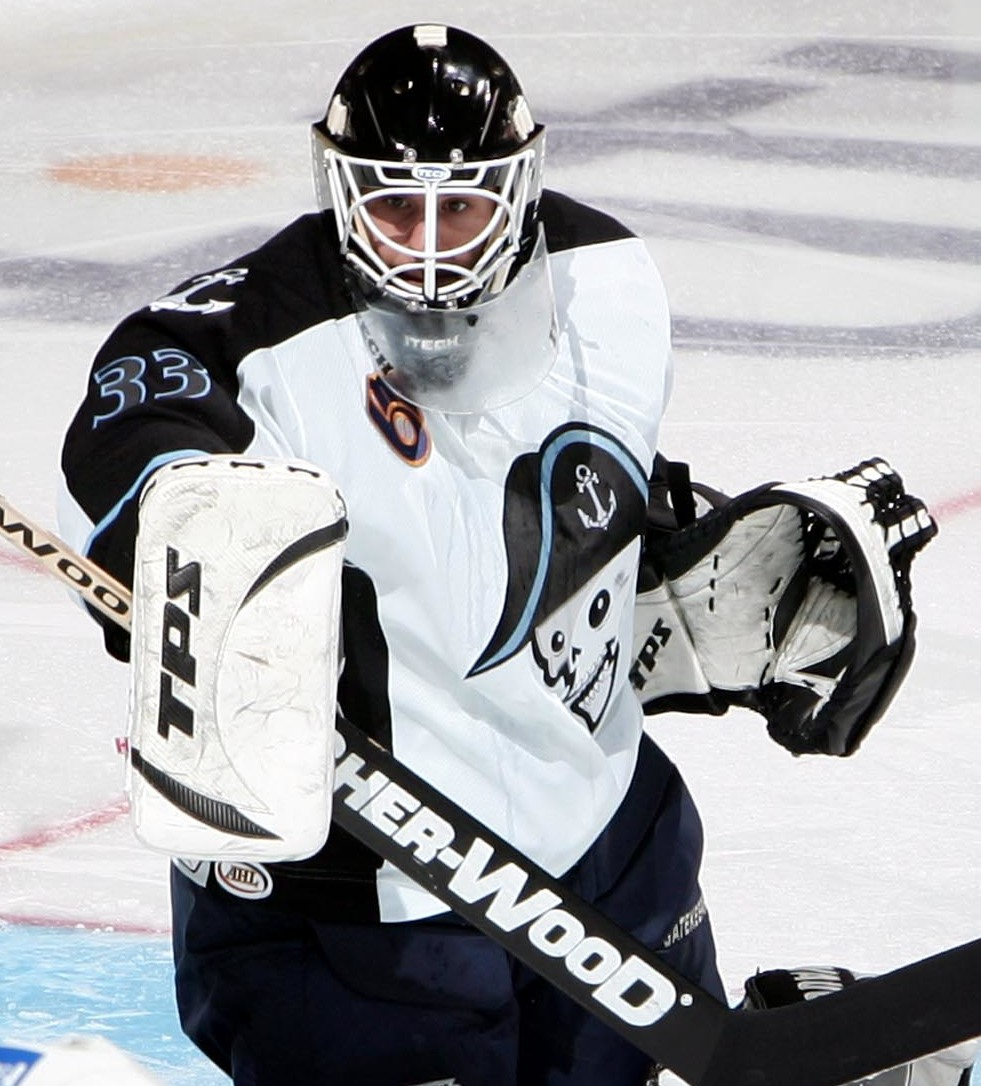
- Reid with the Milwaukee Admirals in 2006
- Born: November 25, 1976 (age 49) Grande Prairie, Alberta, Canada
- Height: 6 ft 3 in (191 cm)
- Weight: 185 lb (84 kg; 13 st 3 lb)
- Position: Goaltender
- Caught: Left
- Played for: AHL; Milwaukee Admirals; Norfolk Admirals; Peoria Rivermen; ECHL; Alaska Aces; WCHL; Bakersfield Fog; Reno Rage; CHL; San Antonio Iguanas; San Angelo Saints; Corpus Christi Rayz; New Mexico Scorpions; Rocky Mountain Rage; Texas Brahmas; Arizona Sundogs; EIHL; Edinburgh Capitals
- NHL draft: Undrafted
- Playing career: 1996–2012

Scott Reid (born November 25, 1976) is a Canadian former professional ice hockey goaltender.

== Career ==
Reid is a two-time Central Hockey League (CHL) All-Star. During the 2003–04 season he collected 6 shutouts and 32 wins, and led the CHL with 1523 saves a .938 save percentage. Reid was recognized for his standout play when he was awarded the 2004 Scott Brower Memorial Trophy as the CHL's Most Outstanding Goaltender. Reid also played for the Alaska Aces and the Arizona Sundogs.

== Personal life ==
Reid is the husband of Meaghan Mikkelson. They have two children including a son named Calder.

== Awards and honours ==
Award	Year
CHL Most Outstanding Goaltender	2003–04
