= Jamie Rivers =

Canadian ice hockey player (born 1975)

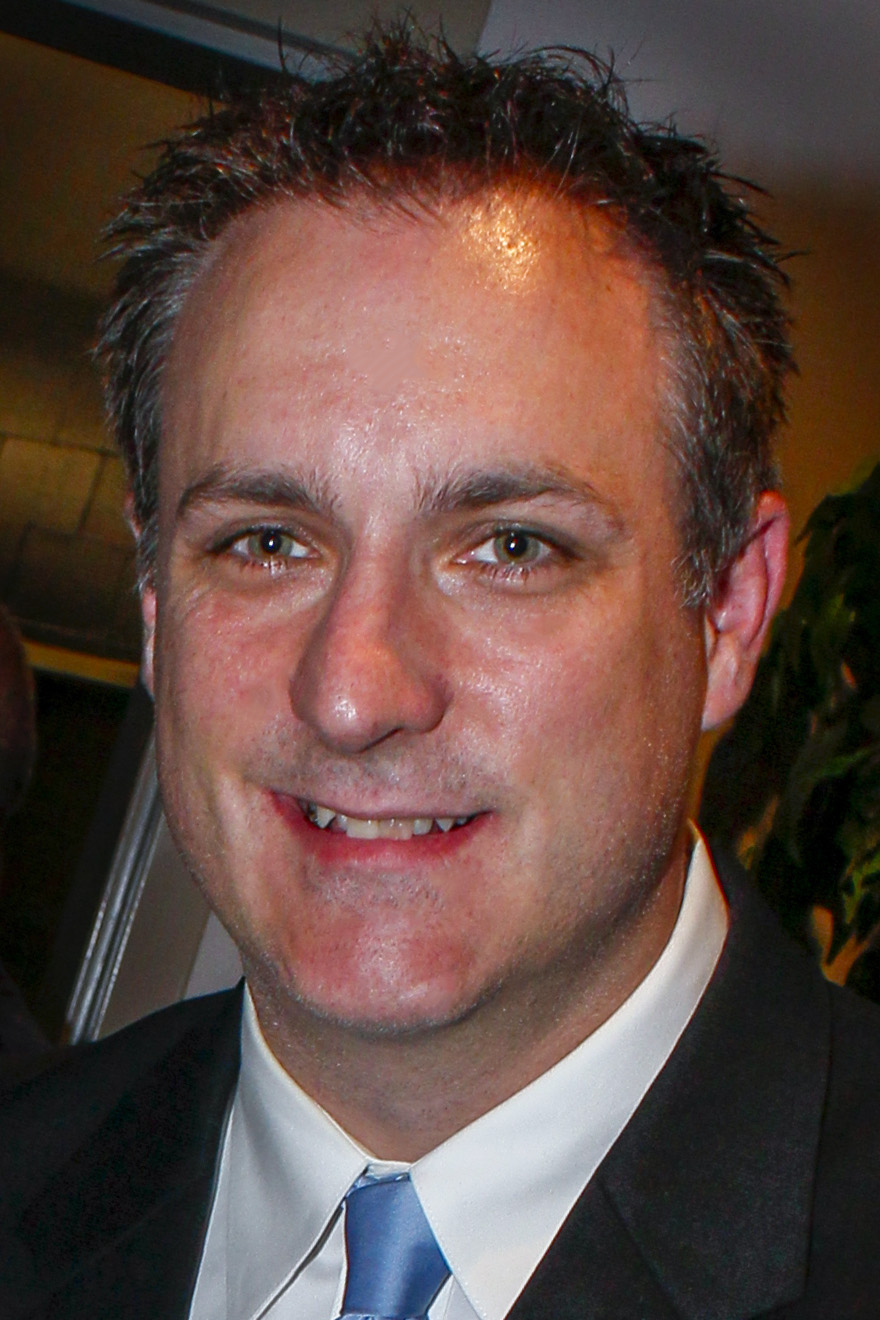
- Born: March 16, 1975 (age 51) Timmins, Ontario, Canada
- Height: 6 ft 0 in (183 cm)
- Weight: 206 lb (93 kg; 14 st 10 lb)
- Position: Defence
- Shot: Left
- Played for: St. Louis Blues; New York Islanders; Ottawa Senators; Boston Bruins; Florida Panthers; Detroit Red Wings; Phoenix Coyotes; Spartak Moscow; HC Ambri-Piotta; KHL Medveščak
- NHL draft: 63rd overall, 1993; St. Louis Blues
- Playing career: 1995–2011

Jamie Barry Rivers (born March 16, 1975) is a Canadian professional broadcaster and former professional ice hockey coach, executive and former player. He currently serves as the color commentator for St. Louis Blues broadcasts on Bally Sports Midwest, as well as a co-host on the 101 ESPN St. Louis radio program The Fast Lane. Rivers was the head coach and General Manager of the Central Hockey League's St. Charles Chill. Rivers played 454 games in the National Hockey League (NHL). He last played in Europe for KHL Medveščak. He is Huron First Nations.

== Playing career ==
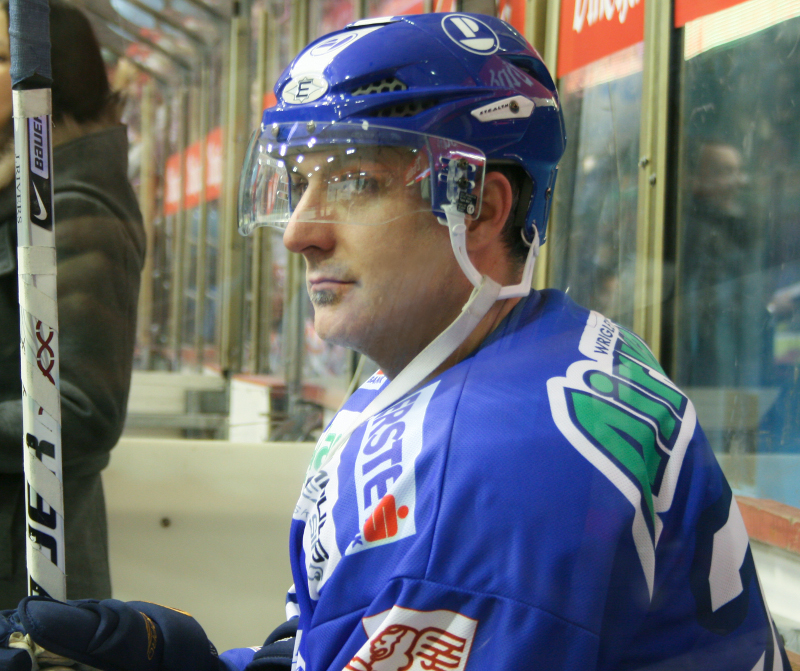
Rivers during his stint at KHL Medveščak

Rivers was drafted in the third round, 63rd overall by the St. Louis Blues in the 1993 NHL entry draft. Jamie Rivers also has a brother, Shawn, who played for the Tampa Bay Lightning. He has represented Canada at the 2009 Spengler Cup.

On November 19, 2009, Rivers returned to Europe after a season in the American Hockey League with the Chicago Wolves to join HC Ambri-Piotta of the Swiss National League A.

In the succeeding 2010–11 season, Rivers remained in Europe and following a trial signed with KHL Medveščak, at the time a member of the Austrian Hockey League, on December 16, 2010. During his 14th game with Medveščak, Rivers suffered a ruptured spleen after completing a check. After initially going undiagnosed, a few days later Rivers was rushed to hospital and underwent emergency surgery. Suffering a large amount of internal bleeding, Rivers' heart stopped before he was electronically defibrillated back to life. Rivers was ruled out for the remainder of the season and returned to St. Louis, where he now lives with his wife Shannon, 22-year-old daughter Karson, 19-year-old twin boys Ashton and Braydon, and 14-year-old McKinnon.

== Post-playing career ==
On September 17, 2012, Rivers was named head coach of the St. Charles Chill of the Central Hockey League. The team played for one season, 2013-2014, before ceasing operations.

On August 16, 2023, he was promoted as the color commentator for St. Louis Blues broadcasts on Bally Sports Midwest. Previously, he served as a studio analyst and fill-in color commentator for Darren Pang, a role he shared with Bernie Federko, in select games.

Rivers is a co-host on the 101 ESPN St. Louis radio program The Fast Lane, with Anthony Stalter and Super Bowl Champion Carey Davis.

== Career statistics ==
=== Regular season and playoffs ===
			Regular season					Playoffs
Season	Team	League	GP	G	A	Pts	PIM	GP	G	A	Pts	PIM
1990–91	Ottawa Jr. Senators	CJHL	44	4	30	34	74	—	—	—	—	—
1991–92	Sudbury Wolves	OHL	55	3	13	16	20	8	0	0	0	0
1992–93	Sudbury Wolves	OHL	62	12	43	55	20	14	7	19	26	4
1993–94	Sudbury Wolves	OHL	65	32	89	121	58	10	1	9	10	14
1994–95	Sudbury Wolves	OHL	46	9	56	65	30	18	7	26	33	22
1995–96	Worcester IceCats	AHL	75	7	45	52	130	4	0	1	1	4
1995–96	St. Louis Blues	NHL	3	0	0	0	2	—	—	—	—	—
1996–97	Worcester IceCats	AHL	63	8	35	43	83	5	1	2	3	14
1996–97	St. Louis Blues	NHL	15	2	5	7	6	—	—	—	—	—
1997–98	St. Louis Blues	NHL	59	2	4	6	36	—	—	—	—	—
1998–99	St. Louis Blues	NHL	76	2	5	7	47	9	1	1	2	2
1999–2000	New York Islanders	NHL	75	1	16	17	84	—	—	—	—	—
2000–01	Grand Rapids Griffins	IHL	2	0	0	0	2	—	—	—	—	—
2000–01	Ottawa Senators	NHL	45	2	4	6	44	1	0	0	0	4
2001–02	Ottawa Senators	NHL	2	0	0	0	4	—	—	—	—	—
2001–02	Boston Bruins	NHL	64	4	2	6	45	3	0	0	0	0
2002–03	Florida Panthers	NHL	1	0	0	0	2	—	—	—	—	—
2002–03	San Antonio Rampage	AHL	50	6	19	25	68	3	0	1	1	10
2003–04	Grand Rapids Griffins	AHL	2	0	0	0	4	—	—	—	—	—
2003–04	Detroit Red Wings	NHL	50	3	4	7	41	2	0	0	0	2
2004–05	Hershey Bears	AHL	50	7	13	20	46	—	—	—	—	—
2005–06	Detroit Red Wings	NHL	15	0	1	1	12	—	—	—	—	—
2005–06	Phoenix Coyotes	NHL	18	0	5	5	26	—	—	—	—	—
2006–07	St. Louis Blues	NHL	31	1	3	4	36	—	—	—	—	—
2006–07	Peoria Rivermen	AHL	30	4	19	23	24	—	—	—	—	—
2007–08	Spartak Moscow	RSL	19	0	3	3	42	4	0	0	0	8
2008–09	Chicago Wolves	AHL	69	4	24	28	72	—	—	—	—	—
2009–10	HC Ambrì–Piotta	NLA	24	0	8	8	34	—	—	—	—	—
2010–11	KHL Medveščak	EBEL	14	1	8	9	37	—	—	—	—	—
AHL totals			339	36	155	191	427	12	1	4	5	28
NHL totals			454	17	49	66	385	15	1	1	2	8

=== International ===
Medal record

Representing Canada

Ice hockey

World Junior Championships
Gold medal – first place	1995 Red Deer	

Year	Team	Event	Result	GP	G	A	Pts	PIM
1995	Canada	WJC	1st place, gold medalist(s)	7	3	3	6	2
Junior totals				7	3	3	6	2

== Awards and honours ==
Award	Year	Notes
OHL
First All-Star Team	1993–94	
Max Kaminsky Trophy	1993–94	
CHL Second All-Star Team	1993–94	
Second All-Star Team	1994–95	
AHL
Second All-Star Team	1996–97	
