= Rocky Mountain Rage =

American ice hockey team

- City: Broomfield, Colorado
- League: Central Hockey League
- Conference: Northern Conference
- Division: Northwest Division
- Founded: 2006; 20 years ago
- Folded: 2009; 17 years ago
- Home arena: Broomfield Event Center
- Colors: Burgundy, Black, Khaki, Salmon, White
- Owners: Tim Wiens & John Frew
- Head coach: Tracy Egeland

Franchise history
- 2006–2009: Rocky Mountain Rage

The Rocky Mountain Rage were a professional ice hockey team that played in the Central Hockey League between the 2006–07 and 2008–09 seasons. They played their home games at the Broomfield Event Center in Broomfield, Colorado.

On June 18, 2009, the team announced it was suspending operations for the 2009–10 CHL season with hopes of returning in 2010–11, but went defunct.

== Year-by-year record ==
=== Regular season ===
Season	W	L	OTL	Pts	Win %	Finish
2006–07	17	40	7	41	.320	4th, Northwest Division
2007–08	36	22	6	78	.609	2nd, Northwest Division
2008–09	32	26	6	70	.547	2nd, Northwest Division; 5th, Northern Conference

=== Playoffs ===
Season	W	L	Win %	Opponents	Outcome
2009	1	2	.333	Bossier-Shreveport	L [1-2]

== All-Stars ==
=== Players ===
- 2007 David Noah, Goalie
- 2007 Mark Wires, Left Wing
- 2008 Tyler Butler, Defenseman
- 2008 Brent Cullaton, Right Wing, Starter, North Captain, North MVP
- 2008 Scott Reid, Goalie
- 2008 Scott Wray, Left Wing, Starter
- 2009 Daymen Rycroft, Center
