= 2010–11 Arizona Sundogs season =

2010–11 Arizona Sundogs
- Conference: 7th Berry
- 2010–11 record: 25-31-10
- Home record: 13-18-2
- Road record: 12-13-8
- Goals for: 204
- Goals against: 253

Team information
- Coach: Marco Pietroniro
- Assistant coach: Chris Bartolone
- Captain: Tyler Butler
- Alternate captains: Joel Irving; Jason Visser
- Arena: Tim's Toyota Center
- Average attendance: 2,150

Team leaders
- Goals: Luke Erickson (35)
- Assists: Kyle Hood (54)
- Points: Kyle Hood (69)
- Penalty minutes: Adam Smyth (310)
- Plus/minus: Jim Driscoll (+3); Patrick Schafer; Craig Macdonald
- Wins: Levente Szuper (18)
- Goals against average: Levente Szuper (3.38)

The 2010–11 Arizona Sundogs season was the fifth season of the CHL franchise in Prescott Valley, Arizona.

== Regular season ==
=== Conference standings ===
Arizona Sundogs Fifth Anniversary Logo

Berry Conference	GP	W	L	OTL	GF	GA	Pts
z-Allen Americans	66	47	16	3	271	211	97
x-Bossier-Shreveport Mudbugs	66	37	26	3	229	193	77
x-Tulsa Oilers	66	35	25	6	242	234	76
x-Texas Brahmas	66	34	27	5	227	228	73
x-Odessa Jackalopes	66	31	28	7	241	238	69
x-Mississippi RiverKings	66	30	31	5	199	229	65
x-Arizona Sundogs	66	25	31	10	204	253	60
x-Rio Grande Valley Killer Bees	66	25	35	6	194	232	56
Laredo Bucks	66	24	34	8	194	228	56

x – Qualified for playoffs; y – Won division; z – Won regular season league title After games of March 27, 2011.

== Awards and records ==
=== Awards ===
Regular Season
Player	Award	Awarded
Levente Szuper	Oakley CHL Goaltender of the Week	December 7, 2010
Luke Erickson	Oakley CHL Player of the Week	January 10, 2011

=== Milestones ===
Regular Season
Player	Milestone	Reached

== Transactions ==
The Sundogs have been involved in the following transactions during the 2010–11 season.

Trades
October 25, 2010	To Missouri Mavericks: Future Considerations	To Arizona: Karl Sellan
February 7, 2011	To Bloomington PrairieThunder: Billy Bezeau; Jason Williams	To Arizona: Craig Macdonald; Future Considerations

Player Signings
Player	Former team	Date
Yan Turcotte	McGill Redmen	October 19, 2010
Maxime Renaud	Baie-Comeau Drakkar	October 29, 2010
Jim Driscoll	Northeastern Huskies	November 4, 2010
Levente Szuper	Hannover Scorpions	November 5, 2010
Morgan MacLean	Odessa Jackalopes	February 1, 2011

Lost via waivers
Player	Date
Mike Nesdill	October 18, 2010
Yan Turcotte	October 27, 2010
Chase Watson	October 30, 2010
Chris Kane	November 3, 2010

== Final roster ==
No.	Nat	Player	Pos	S/G	Age	Acquired	Birthplace	Contract
61	(Canada)	Clayton Barthel	D	L	38	2010	Kelowna, British Columbia	Sundogs
23	(Canada)	Tyler Butler (C)	D	R	45	2010	Kanata, Ontario	Sundogs
4	(United States)	Jim Driscoll	D	L	39	2010	Dedham, Massachusetts	Sundogs
21	(United States)	Luke Erickson	F	R	42	2010	Roseau, Minnesota	Sundogs
71	(Canada)	Samuel Grenache	RW	R	35	2010	Windsor, Quebec	Sundogs
40	(Canada)	Doug Groenestege	G	L	41	2009	Stratford, Ontario	Sundogs
8	(Canada)	Kyle Hood	F	R	40	2008	Osoyoos, British Columbia	Sundogs
22	(Canada)	Cam Keith	LW	L	44	2010	Nelson, British Columbia	Sundogs
17	(Canada)	Mark Kolanos	RW	R	40	2010	Calgary, Alberta	Sundogs
10	(Canada)	Cory Laurysen	D	L	39	2010	Carp, Ontario	Sundogs
61	(Canada)	Craig MacDonald	RW	L	42	2009	Milton, Ontario	Sundogs
67	(Canada)	Morgan MacLean	F	R	36	2010	Grande Prairie, Alberta	Sundogs
16	(Canada)	Maxime Renaud	D	R	36	2010	Saint-Eustache, Quebec	Sundogs
27	(United States)	Patrick Schafer	F	R	37	2010	Hilliard, Ohio	Sundogs
28	(Canada)	Karl Sellan	F	L	39	2010	Montreal, Quebec	Sundogs
19	(United States)	Joey Sides	F	L	39	2010	Sun Valley, Idaho	Sundogs
2	(Canada)	Adam Smyth	RW	R	41	2009	Wiarton, Ontario	Sundogs
31	(Hungary)	Levente Szuper	G	L	44	2010	Budapest, Hungary	Sundogs
26	(Canada)	Jamie VanderVeeken	D	L	39	2010	Wallaceburg, Ontario	Sundogs
9	(Canada)	Jason Visser (A)	F	L	42	2007	Mississauga, Ontario	Sundogs
7	(United States)	John Wessbecker	D	R	38	2010	Victoria, Minnesota	Sundogs

== Affiliates ==
- NHL - Phoenix Coyotes
- AHL - San Antonio Rampage

== See also ==
- 2010–11 CHL season
