= Rio Grande Valley Killer Bees (CHL) =

- City: Hidalgo, Texas
- League: Central Hockey League
- Conference: Berry
- Operated: 2003-2012
- Home arena: State Farm Arena
- Colors: Black, teal, gold
- Owners: Hidalgo Sports, LLC
- General manager: Terry Ruskowski
- Head coach: Terry Ruskowski
- Captain: Aaron Lee
- Media: 102.1-FM KBUC with Keith Lavon
- Affiliates: Formerly; Florida Panthers (NHL); San Antonio Rampage (AHL)

Franchise history
- 2003–2012: Rio Grande Valley Killer Bees

Championships
- Regular season titles: None
- Division titles: None
- Conference titles: None
- Ray Miron President's Cup: None

The Rio Grande Valley Killer Bees were a minor league professional ice hockey team that played in the Central Hockey League. The team was based in the Rio Grande Valley in Hidalgo, Texas, just south of McAllen, and played their home games at State Farm Arena.

== History ==
The team was a member of the Central Hockey League from 2003 to 2012, and two time CHL franchise of the year (2003–04 and 2008–09). Billy Newson, formerly of the Northeastern University Huskies, is the franchise's leader in goals (90), assists (102) and points (192), while Ryan Shmyr is the career leader in games played and penalty minutes. On June 28, 2011, Terry Ruskowski became the coach of the Killer Bees. He had formerly been the initial coach of the rival Laredo Bucks. Ruskowski had a two-year contract with the Bees. While in the CHL, the Killer Bees were affiliated with the Florida Panthers of the National Hockey League and the San Antonio Rampage of the American Hockey League.

On June 20, 2012, multiple sources confirmed that the Killer Bees would not play in the 2012–13 season and ceased operations due to increased travel costs after the folding of the other Texas CHL teams in Austin, Corpus Christi and Laredo.

After a season without a team, the owners of the Wenatchee Wild franchise in the North American Hockey League (NAHL), a Tier II junior A hockey league, relocated the team to Hidalgo, Texas, and took on the identity of the Rio Grande Valley Killer Bees. The team eventually relocated to Pennsylvania after only two seasons. In 2018, another junior level Killer Bees was announced as part of the USA Central Hockey League starting in October 2018, but the league folded after six weeks of operation.

== Team record ==
| Season | Conference | Division | GP | W | L | OTL | SOL | Pts | Pct | GF | GA | PIM | Coach | Results |
| 2003-04 | Southern | Southeast | 64 | 32 | 24 | 0 | 8 | 72 | 0.563 | 165 | 162 | 1263 | Tracy Egeland | Lost in round 1 |
| 2004-05 | Southern | Southeast | 60 | 19 | 38 | 1 | 2 | 41 | 0.342 | 149 | 221 | 1338 | Tracy Egeland | Out of playoffs |
| 2005-06 | Southern | Southeast | 64 | 33 | 25 | 3 | 3 | 72 | 0.563 | 204 | 183 | 1165 | Tracy Egeland | Lost in round 1 |
| 2006-07 | Southern | Southeast | 64 | 28 | 28 | 4 | 4 | 64 | 0.500 | 185 | 203 | 1606 | Paul Fixter | Lost in round 1 |
| 2007-08 | Southern | Southeast | 64 | 16 | 41 | 3 | 4 | 39 | 0.305 | 171 | 278 | 1478 | Paul Fixter | Out of playoffs |
| 2008-09 | Southern | Southeast | 64 | 35 | 24 | 3 | 2 | 73* | 0.586 | 221 | 198 | 1210 | Chris Brooks | Lost in round 2 |
| 2009-10 | Southern | | 64 | 27 | 27 | 2 | 8 | 64 | 0.500 | 193 | 228 | 1059 | Chris Brooks | Out of playoffs |
| 2010-11 | Berry | | 66 | 25 | 35 | 3 | 3 | 56 | 0.424 | 194 | 232 | 1244 | Chris Brooks | Lost in round 1 |
| 2011-12 | Berry | | 66 | 32 | 27 | 2 | 5 | 71 | 0.538 | 208 | 200 | 1020 | Terry Ruskowski | Lost in round 1 |

== Retired numbers ==
Rio Grande Valley Killer Bees retired numbers
| No. | Player | Position | Career |
|---|---|---|---|
| 7 | Sean Gillam | D | 2003–2006 |

== Franchise leaders ==
=== Games played (top 5) ===
| Player | GP | G | A | P | PIM | Seasons | Yrs |
|---|---|---|---|---|---|---|---|
| Aaron Lee | 255 | 97 | 91 | 188 | 235 | 2008–2012 | 4 |
| Ryan Shmyr | 223 | 38 | 35 | 73 | 856 | 2003–2009 | 4 |
| Billy Newson | 221 | 90 | 102 | 192 | 301 | 2003–2007 | 4 |
| Zak McClellan | 184 | 47 | 80 | 127 | 122 | 2008–2011 | 3 |
| Darcy Smith | 183 | 6 | 35 | 41 | 345 | 2003–2006 | 3 |

=== Goals (top 5) ===
| Player | GP | G | A | P | PIM | Seasons | Yrs |
|---|---|---|---|---|---|---|---|
| Aaron Lee | 255 | 97 | 91 | 188 | 235 | 2008–2012 | 4 |
| Billy Newson | 221 | 90 | 102 | 192 | 301 | 2003–2007 | 4 |
| Daymen Rycroft | 169 | 63 | 75 | 138 | 260 | 2004–2010 | 3 |
| Jesse Bennefield | 114 | 59 | 71 | 130 | 137 | 2008–2010 | 2 |
| Rob Voltera^{Tied} | 127 | 53 | 68 | 121 | 312 | 2006–2009 | 3 |
| Matic Kralj^{Tied} | 180 | 53 | 74 | 127 | 249 | 2003–2006 | 3 |

=== Assists (top 5) ===
| Player | GP | G | A | P | PIM | Seasons | Yrs |
|---|---|---|---|---|---|---|---|
| Billy Newson | 221 | 90 | 102 | 192 | 301 | 2003–2007 | 4 |
| Aaron Lee | 255 | 97 | 91 | 188 | 235 | 2008–2012 | 4 |
| Zak McClellan | 184 | 47 | 80 | 127 | 122 | 2008–2011 | 3 |
| Dennis Maxwell | 139 | 37 | 79 | 116 | 359 | 2006–2009 | 3 |
| Daymen Rycroft | 169 | 63 | 75 | 138 | 260 | 2004–2010 | 3 |

=== Points (top 5) ===
| Player | GP | G | A | P | PIM | Seasons | Yrs |
|---|---|---|---|---|---|---|---|
| Billy Newson | 221 | 90 | 102 | 192 | 301 | 2003–2007 | 4 |
| Aaron Lee | 255 | 97 | 91 | 188 | 235 | 2008–2012 | 4 |
| Daymen Rycroft | 169 | 63 | 75 | 138 | 260 | 2004–2010 | 3 |
| Jesse Bennefield | 114 | 59 | 71 | 130 | 137 | 2008–2010 | 2 |
| Matic Kralj^{Tied} | 180 | 53 | 74 | 127 | 249 | 2003–2006 | 3 |
| Zak McClellan^{Tied} | 184 | 47 | 80 | 127 | 122 | 2008–2011 | 3 |

=== Penalty minutes (top 5) ===
| Player | GP | G | A | P | PIM | Seasons | Yrs |
|---|---|---|---|---|---|---|---|
| Ryan Shmyr | 223 | 38 | 35 | 73 | 856 | 2003–2009 | 4 |
| Dennis Maxwell | 139 | 37 | 79 | 116 | 359 | 2006–2009 | 3 |
| Darcy Smith | 183 | 6 | 35 | 41 | 345 | 2003–2006 | 3 |
| Brett Clouthier | 108 | 12 | 13 | 25 | 320 | 2009–2011 | 2 |
| Rob Voltera | 127 | 53 | 68 | 121 | 312 | 2006–2009 | 3 |

=== Games played (top 5 goalies) ===
| Player | GP | Min | W | L | T | SO | GA | GAA | SV | SV% | Seasons | Yrs |
|---|---|---|---|---|---|---|---|---|---|---|---|---|
| Jeff Levy | 93 | 5408 | 43 | 41 | 6 | 6 | 236 | 2.62 | 2377 | 0.910 | 2003–2005 | 2 |
| Wylie Rogers | 86 | 4775 | 40 | 29 | 11 | 1 | 244 | 3.00 | 2382 | 0.910 | 2008–2012 | 3 |
| Jeff Van Nynatten | 50 | 2678 | 15 | 21 | 6 | 1 | 149 | 3.34 | 1372 | 0.902 | 2006–2008 | 2 |
| Juliano Pagliero | 49 | 2785 | 21 | 23 | 3 | 3 | 151 | 3.25 | 1376 | 0.901 | 2010–2011 | 1 |
| Evan Lindsay | 48 | 2813 | 25 | 18 | 4 | 3 | 117 | 2.50 | 1376 | 0.922 | 2005–2006 | 1 |

=== Wins (top 5 goalies) ===
| Player | GP | Min | W | L | T | SO | GA | GAA | SV | SV% | Seasons | Yrs |
|---|---|---|---|---|---|---|---|---|---|---|---|---|
| Jeff Levy | 93 | 5408 | 43 | 41 | 6 | 6 | 236 | 2.62 | 2377 | 0.910 | 2003–2005 | 2 |
| Wylie Rogers | 86 | 4775 | 40 | 29 | 11 | 1 | 244 | 3.00 | 2382 | 0.910 | 2008–2012 | 3 |
| Evan Lindsay | 48 | 2813 | 25 | 18 | 4 | 3 | 117 | 2.50 | 1376 | 0.922 | 2005–2006 | 1 |
| Juliano Pagliero | 49 | 2785 | 21 | 23 | 3 | 3 | 151 | 3.25 | 1376 | 0.901 | 2010–2011 | 1 |
| Andy Frank | 47 | 2722 | 18 | 18 | 7 | 1 | 148 | 3.26 | 1472 | 0.909 | 2009–2010 | 1 |

=== Shutouts (top 5 goalies) ===
| Player | GP | Min | W | L | T | SO | GA | GAA | SV | SV% | Seasons | Yrs |
|---|---|---|---|---|---|---|---|---|---|---|---|---|
| Jeff Levy | 93 | 5408 | 43 | 41 | 6 | 6 | 236 | 2.62 | 2377 | 0.910 | 2003–2005 | 2 |
| Jacque Vezina | 38 | 2090 | 8 | 21 | 5 | 4 | 121 | 3.47 | 910 | 0.883 | 2003–2005 | 2 |
| Jeremy Symington | 35 | 1944 | 15 | 15 | 4 | 3 | 101 | 3.12 | 1336 | 0.902 | 2007–2008 | 1 |
| Evan Lindsay | 48 | 2813 | 25 | 18 | 4 | 3 | 117 | 2.50 | 1376 | 0.922 | 2005–2006 | 1 |
| Juliano Pagliero | 49 | 2785 | 21 | 23 | 3 | 3 | 151 | 3.25 | 1376 | 0.901 | 2010–2011 | 1 |

=== Goals against average (top 5 goalies) ===
| Player | GP | Min | W | L | T | SO | GA | GAA | SV | SV% | Seasons | Yrs |
|---|---|---|---|---|---|---|---|---|---|---|---|---|
| Evan Lindsay | 48 | 2813 | 25 | 18 | 4 | 3 | 117 | 2.50 | 1376 | 0.922 | 2005–2006 | 1 |
| Jeff Levy | 93 | 5408 | 43 | 41 | 6 | 6 | 236 | 2.62 | 2377 | 0.910 | 2003–2005 | 2 |
| John Murray | 36 | 1959 | 16 | 48 | 0 | 3 | 87 | 2.66 | 982 | 0.919 | 2011-2012 | 1 |
| Christian Boucher | 37 | 1971 | 17 | 14 | 7 | 2 | 95 | 2.89 | 1077 | 0.919 | 2008–2009 | 1 |
| Wylie Rogers | 86 | 4775 | 40 | 29 | 11 | 1 | 244 | 3.00 | 2382 | 0.910 | 2008–2012 | 3 |

=== Save percentage (top 5 goalies) ===
| Player | GP | Min | W | L | T | SO | GA | GAA | SV | SV% | Seasons | Yrs |
|---|---|---|---|---|---|---|---|---|---|---|---|---|
| Evan Lindsay | 48 | 2813 | 25 | 18 | 4 | 3 | 117 | 2.50 | 1376 | 0.922 | 2005–2006 | 1 |
| John Murray | 36 | 1959 | 16 | 48 | 0 | 3 | 87 | 2.66 | 982 | 0.919 | 2011-2012 | 1 |
| Christian Boucher | 37 | 1971 | 17 | 14 | 7 | 2 | 95 | 2.89 | 1077 | 0.919 | 2008–2009 | 1 |
| Jeff Levy | 93 | 5408 | 43 | 41 | 6 | 6 | 236 | 2.62 | 2377 | 0.910 | 2003–2005 | 2 |
| Wylie Rogers | 86 | 4775 | 40 | 29 | 11 | 1 | 244 | 3.00 | 2382 | 0.910 | 2008–2012 | 3 |

Note: GP = Games played; G = Goals; A = Assists; P = Points; PIM = Penalties in minutes; Min = Minutes played; W = Wins; L = Losses; T = Ties; SO = Shutouts; GA = Goals against; GAA = Goals against average; SV = Saves; SV% = Save percentage; Seasons = What seasons were played with the Bees; Yrs = Number of years with the Bees; * = The CHL penalized the Killer Bees by removing two points.

== Notable players ==
- Ryan Warsofsky
