= 2010–11 Odessa Jackalopes season =

2010–11 Odessa Jackalopes (1997–2011)
- Conference: Berry
- 2010–11 record: 31-28-7
- Home record: 17-15-1
- Road record: 14-13-6
- Goals for: 241
- Goals against: 238

Team information
- General manager: Joe Clark
- Coach: Paul Gillis
- Assistant coach: Matt Cressman
- Captain: David van Drunen
- Alternate captains: Sébastien Thinel; Philippe Plante
- Arena: Ector County Coliseum

Team leaders
- Goals: Sébastien Thinel (35)
- Assists: Sébastien Thinel (75)
- Points: Sébastien Thinel (110)
- Penalty minutes: Alex Dunn (178)
- Plus/minus: Todd Robinson (+20)
- Wins: Joel Martin (11)
- Goals against average: Joel Martin 3.53

The 2010–11 Odessa Jackalopes season was the 10th season of the CHL franchise in Odessa, Texas.

== Regular season ==
=== Conference standings ===
Berry Conference	GP	W	L	OTL	GF	GA	Pts
z-Allen Americans	66	47	16	3	271	211	97
x-Bossier-Shreveport Mudbugs	66	37	26	3	229	193	77
x-Tulsa Oilers	66	35	25	6	242	234	76
x-Texas Brahmas	66	34	27	5	227	228	73
x-Odessa Jackalopes	66	31	28	7	241	238	69
x-Mississippi RiverKings	66	30	31	5	199	229	65
x-Arizona Sundogs	66	25	31	10	204	253	60
x-Rio Grande Valley Killer Bees	66	25	35	6	194	232	56
Laredo Bucks	66	24	34	8	194	228	56

x – Qualified for playoffs; y – Won division; z – Won regular season league title After games of March 27, 2011.

== Awards and records ==
=== Awards ===
Regular Season
Player	Award	Awarded
Sebastien Sherwood	Oakley CHL Player of the Week	November 22, 2010
Michel Robinson	Oakley CHL Goalie of the Week	November 30, 2010
Sebastien Thinel	Sher-Wood CHL Player of the Month (November)	December 2, 2010
Sebastien Thinel	CHL Oakley First Star of the Month (November)	December 7, 2010

=== Milestones ===
Regular Season
Player	Milestone	Reached

== Transactions ==
The Jackalopes have been involved in the following transactions during the 2010–11 season.

Trades

December 2, 2010	To Bloomington PrairieThunder: Pierre-Olivier Beaulieu; David Brown	To Odessa: Justin Sawyer

== Roster ==
Goaltenders
#		Player	Catches	Date of birth	Place of birth
37	(Canada)	Mike Mole	R	Oct. 12, 1982	Moncton, New Brunswick
41	(United States)	David McKee €	R	Dec. 5 1983	Irving, Texas
49	(United States)	Joel Martin §	L	Oct. 8, 1982	Fort Worth, Texas

Defensemen
#		Player	Shoots	Date of birth	Place of birth
2	(Canada)	Justin Sawyer	L	Oct. 18, 1985	Oshawa, Ontario
4	(Canada)	Patrick Mbaraga	L	Feb. 11, 1981	Ancienne-Lorette, Quebec
6	(United States)	Garrett Gruenke	L	Oct. 13, 1983	Plymouth, Minnesota
7	(United States)	Alex Dunn	R	Jan. 26, 1982	Waterford, Michigan
13	(Canada)	Kevin Seibel	L	Mar. 8, 1983	Swift Current, Saskatchewan
22	(United States)	Matt Gens	R	Mar. 31, 1983	Baudette, Minnesota
24	(Canada)	Philippe Plante – A	L	Aug. 10, 1978	Greenfield Park, Quebec
27	(Canada)	David van Drunen – C (30-day IR)	R	Jan. 31, 1976	Sherwood Park, Alberta
—	(Canada)	Michael Schutte (suspended)	L	July 28, 1979	Burlington, Ontario

Forwards
#		Player	Position	Shoots	Date of birth	Place of birth
9	(Canada)	Kenny Bernard (10-day IR)	RW	R	Mar. 18, 1985	Sarnia, Ontario
10	(Canada)	Dominic Leveille	RW	L	Sep. 24, 1981	St. Jerome, Quebec
11	(Canada)	Mark Ehl	C	L	Nov. 3, 1985	Vancouver, British Columbia
15	(Canada)	Kenny Corupe	C	R	Jan. 18, 1980	Hamilton, Ontario
17	(United States)	Jeff Pierce	F	R	Nov. 10, 1983	Troy, Michigan
19	(Canada)	Mike Ramsay – A	RW	R	Sep. 13, 1984	Newmarket, Ontario
20	(Canada)	Jean Bourbeau §	RW	R	Dec. 13, 1983	Bonnyville, Alberta
21	(United States)	Luke Stauffacher	RW	R	Dec. 17, 1980	Madison, Wisconsin
28	(Canada)	Mike Lesperance	LW	L	June 9, 1985	Newmarket, Ontario
39	(Canada)	Todd Robinson	C	R	June 19, 1987	Trail, British Columbia
43	(Canada)	Sebastien Thinel – C	LW	L	Mar. 24, 1981	Lafontaine, Quebec

§ - assigned by the Bridgeport Sound Tigers (AHL)
Δ - signed to Amateur Tryout Contract
€ - emergency backup goaltender
♯ - signed to 5-game contract

== Affiliates ==
- NHL - New York Islanders
- AHL - Bridgeport Sound Tigers

== See also ==
- 2010–11 CHL season
