= Kevin Kaminski =

Canadian ice hockey player

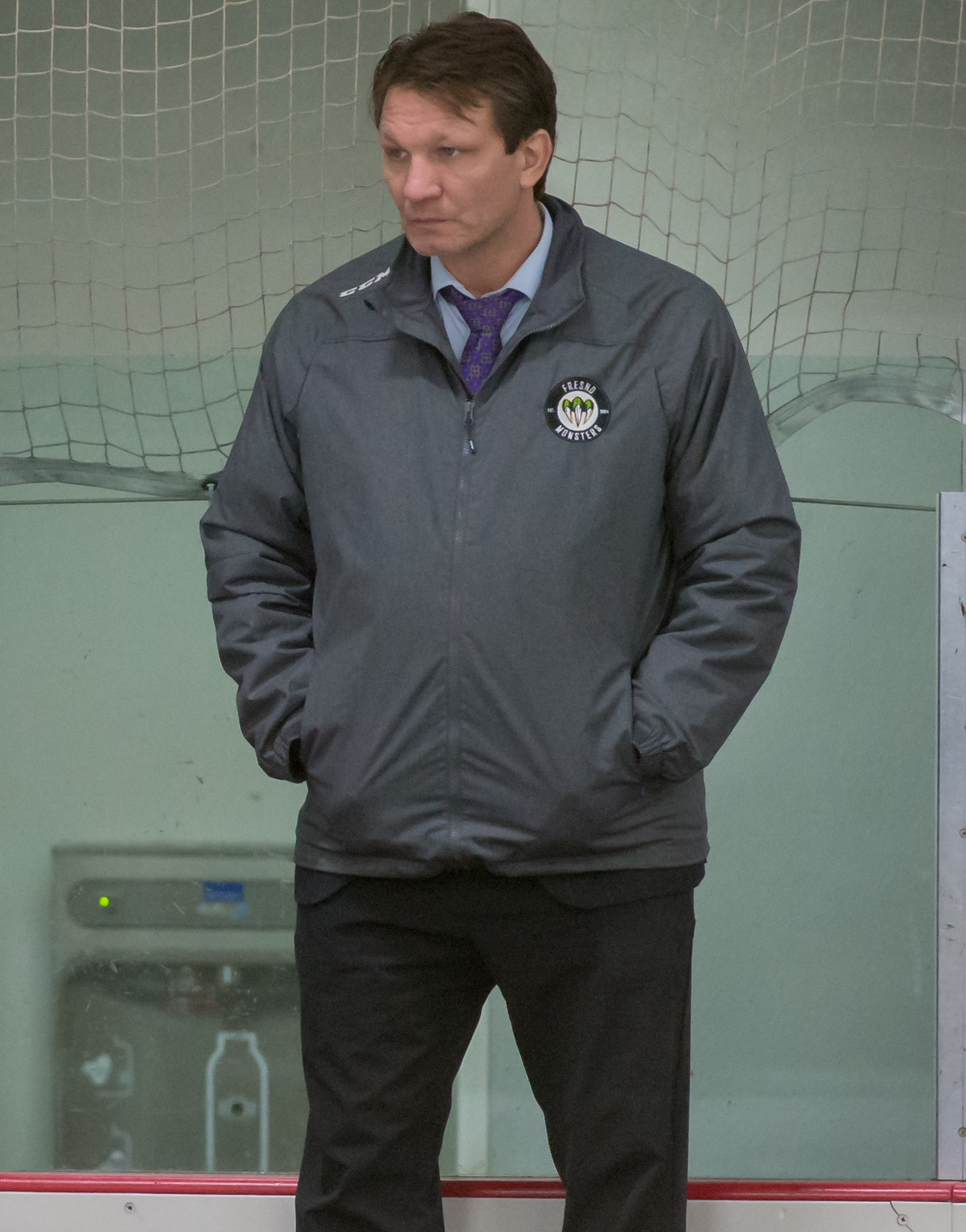
- Kaminski with the Fresno Monsters in 2018
- Born: March 13, 1969 (age 57) Churchbridge, Saskatchewan, Canada
- Height: 5 ft 10 in (178 cm)
- Weight: 190 lb (86 kg; 13 st 8 lb)
- Position: Centre
- Shot: Left
- Played for: Minnesota North Stars; Quebec Nordiques; Washington Capitals
- NHL draft: 48th overall, 1987; Minnesota North Stars
- Playing career: 1988–2000

Kevin “Killer” Kaminski (born March 13, 1969) is a Canadian former professional ice hockey player. He played 139 games in the National Hockey League with the Minnesota North Stars, Quebec Nordiques, and Washington Capitals between 1988 and 1997. The rest of his career, which lasted from 1998 to 2000, was spent in the minor leagues, where his role was an enforcer. He is currently the head coach of the La Ronge Ice Wolves of the Saskatchewan Junior Hockey League.

== Playing career ==
Selected in the 1987 NHL entry draft by the Minnesota North Stars, Kaminski played one game for the North Stars before he was traded to the Quebec Nordiques in exchange for Gaetan Duchesne. Former ice hockey player and writer Ken Dryden wrote about Kaminski's efforts to become a professional hockey player in his book Home Game: Hockey and Life in Canada (1990) (which was co-authored with Roy MacGregor) which was televised on the Canadian Broadcasting Corporation in 1990 as "Home Game: Episode 5, The Common Passion". After spending several years in the Nordiques organization, principally for their Halifax Citadels AHL team, he was traded to the Washington Capitals prior to the 1993–94 NHL season.

During his four seasons with the Capitals, his hard-nosed style of play made him a fan favorite, as he would not hesitate to fight players much bigger than he was. He played three more seasons in the minors for the Portland Pirates of the American Hockey League before retiring in 1999.

Although Kaminski played only 286 games in the AHL, less than four full seasons' worth, he stands in the top 50 in all-time career penalty minutes for the league.

== Coaching career ==
After retiring from playing, Kaminski moved on to coaching starting as an assistant with the Cincinnati Mighty Ducks in 2000. He got his first head coaching position in 2002 with the Long Beach Ice Dogs in the West Coast Hockey League where he stayed for two seasons before being released. He has since coached for the Missouri River Otters (UHL), Youngstown SteelHounds (CHL), Mississippi RiverKings (CHL), Louisiana IceGators (SPHL), and the Louisiana Drillers (NA3HL). In October 2016, he took the head coaching position with the Fresno Monsters of the Western States Hockey League, a Tier II junior team. After three seasons in Fresno, he returned to Saskatchewan and the head coaching position with the La Ronge Ice Wolves.

Kaminski won the CHL's coach of the year award with the Mississippi RiverKings in the 2008–09 season.

== Career statistics ==
=== Regular season and playoffs ===
			Regular season					Playoffs
Season	Team	League	GP	G	A	Pts	PIM	GP	G	A	Pts	PIM
1984–85	Saskatoon Blades	WHL	5	0	1	1	17	—	—	—	—	—
1985–86	Saskatoon Blazers U18	SMAAAHL	32	39	64	103	106	—	—	—	—	—
1985–86	Saskatoon Blades	WHL	4	1	1	2	35	2	0	0	0	5
1986–87	Saskatoon Blades	WHL	67	26	44	70	325	11	5	6	11	45
1987–88	Saskatoon Blades	WHL	55	38	61	99	247	10	5	7	12	37
1988–89	Minnesota North Stars	NHL	1	0	0	0	0	—	—	—	—	—
1988–89	Saskatoon Blades	WHL	52	25	43	68	199	8	4	9	13	25
1988–89	Saskatoon Blades	M-Cup	—	—	—	—	—	4	0	4	4	9
1989–90	Quebec Nordiques	NHL	1	0	0	0	0	—	—	—	—	—
1989–90	Halifax Citadels	AHL	19	3	4	7	128	2	0	0	0	5
1990–91	Halifax Citadels	AHL	7	1	0	1	44	—	—	—	—	—
1990–91	Fort Wayne Komets	IHL	56	9	15	24	455	19	4	2	6	169
1991–92	Quebec Nordiques	NHL	5	0	0	0	45	—	—	—	—	—
1991–92	Halifax Citadels	AHL	63	18	27	45	329	—	—	—	—	—
1992–93	Halifax Citadels	AHL	79	27	37	64	345	—	—	—	—	—
1993–94	Washington Capitals	NHL	13	0	5	5	87	—	—	—	—	—
1993–94	Portland Pirates	AHL	39	10	22	32	263	16	4	5	9	91
1994–95	Washington Capitals	NHL	27	1	1	2	102	5	0	0	0	36
1994–95	Portland Pirates	AHL	34	15	20	35	292	—	—	—	—	—
1995–96	Washington Capitals	NHL	54	1	2	3	164	3	0	0	0	16
1996–97	Washington Capitals	NHL	38	1	2	3	130	—	—	—	—	—
1997–98	Portland Pirates	AHL	40	8	12	20	242	8	2	1	3	69
1998–99	Las Vegas Thunder	IHL	39	7	10	17	217	—	—	—	—	—
1999–00	Providence Bruins	AHL	5	0	2	2	17	—	—	—	—	—
1999–00	Orlando Solar Bears	IHL	5	0	0	0	9	—	—	—	—	—
AHL totals			286	82	124	206	1660	26	6	6	12	165
NHL totals			139	3	10	13	528	8	0	0	0	52
