= 2010–11 Allen Americans season =

2010–11 Allen Americans
- Berry Conference champions
- Conference: Berry
- 2010–11 record: 47-16-3
- Home record: 23-8-2
- Road record: 24-8-1
- Goals for: 271
- Goals against: 211

Team information
- Coach: Dwight Mullins
- Assistant coach: Bill McDonald
- Arena: Allen Event Center
- Average attendance: 3,986

Team leaders
- Goals: Bruce Graham; Nino Musitelli (34)
- Assists: Colton Yellow Horn (55)
- Points: Colton Yellow Horn (88)
- Penalty minutes: Kip Brennan (146)
- Plus/minus: Dave Bonk (+27)
- Wins: Chris Whitley (23)
- Goals against average: Chris Whitley (2.86)

The 2010–11 Allen Americans season was the second season of the CHL franchise in Allen, Texas.

== Regular season ==
=== Conference standings ===
Berry Conference	GP	W	L	OTL	GF	GA	Pts
z-Allen Americans	66	47	16	3	271	211	97
x-Bossier-Shreveport Mudbugs	66	37	26	3	229	193	77
x-Tulsa Oilers	66	35	25	6	242	234	76
x-Texas Brahmas	66	34	27	5	227	228	73
x-Odessa Jackalopes	66	31	28	7	241	238	69
x-Mississippi RiverKings	66	30	31	5	199	229	65
x-Arizona Sundogs	66	25	31	10	204	253	60
x-Rio Grande Valley Killer Bees	66	25	35	6	194	232	56
Laredo Bucks	66	24	34	8	194	228	56

x – Qualified for playoffs; y – Won division; z – Won regular season league title After games of March 27, 2011.

== Awards and records ==
=== Awards ===
Regular Season
Player	Award	Awarded
David Strathman	CHL All-Rookie Team	March 18, 2011

=== Milestones ===
Regular Season
Player	Milestone	Reached

== Transactions ==
The Americans were involved in the following transactions during the 2010–11 season.

Trades

January 14, 2011	To Wichita Thunder: Dustin Donaghy	To Allen: Future Considerations

== Roster ==
No.	Nat	Player	Pos	S/G	Age	Acquired	Birthplace	Contract
32	(Canada)	Erik Adams	D	R	45	2009	Thunder Bay, Ontario	Americans
9	(Canada)	Judd Blackwater	C	L	37	2010	Lethbridge, Alberta	Americans
51	(Canada)	Dave Bonk	C	L	42	2010	Brandon, Manitoba	Americans
37	(Canada)	Kip Brennan	LW	L	44	2010	Kingston, Ontario	Americans
31	(Canada)	Scott Campbell	G	R	39	2010	Bloomfield, Ontario	Americans
27	(United States)	Greg Gallagher	D	L	41	2010	Framingham, Massachusetts	Americans
21	(Canada)	Bruce Graham	C	L	39	2009	Moncton, New Brunswick	Americans
22	(Canada)	Liam Huculak	RW	R	41	2009	Lethbridge, Alberta	Americans
7	(Canada)	Jarret Lukin	C	L	41	2009	Fort McMurray, Alberta	Americans
55	(Canada)	Mitch McColm	D	R	35	2010	Calgary, Alberta	Americans
23	(United States)	Brian McMillin	F	R	37	2010	Roseau, Minnesota	Americans
4	(Canada)	Iain McPhee	D	L	39	2010	Pickering, Ontario	Americans
11	(United States)	Nino Musitelli	F	R	39	2009	Macomb, Michigan	Americans
3	(Canada)	David Simoes	D	L	39	2010	Vanderhoof, British Columbia	Americans
19	(United States)	David Strathman	D	R	39	2010	Tempe, Arizona	Americans
10	(Canada)	Tobias Whelan	C	L	41	2009	Orillia, Ontario	Americans
83	(Canada)	Chris Whitley	G	R	42	2009	Oshawa, Ontario	Americans
15	(Canada)	Colton Yellow Horn	LW	L	37	2009	Brocket, Alberta	Americans

== Affiliates ==
- NHL - Dallas Stars
- AHL - Texas Stars

== See also ==
- 2010–11 CHL season
