= 2010–11 Bossier-Shreveport Mudbugs season =

2010–11 Bossier-Shreveport Mudbugs
- Ray Miron President's Cup champions
- Conference: Berry
- 2010–11 record: 37-26-3
- Home record: 19-13-1
- Road record: 18-13-2
- Goals for: 229
- Goals against: 193

Team information
- Coach: Scott Muscutt
- Captain: Brett Smith
- Arena: CenturyTel Center
- Average attendance: 3,369

Team leaders
- Goals: David Rutherford (35)
- Assists: Steven Crampton (40)
- Points: David Rutherford (67)
- Penalty minutes: Mitch Love (110)
- Plus/minus: Justin Aikins (+18)
- Wins: John DeCaro (20)
- Goals against average: John DeCaro (2.61)

The 2010–11 Bossier-Shreveport Mudbugs season was the 10th season of the Central Hockey League (CHL) franchise in Bossier City, Louisiana.

== Regular season ==
=== Conference standings ===
| Berry Conference | GP | W | L | OTL | GF | GA | Pts |
|---|---|---|---|---|---|---|---|
| z-Allen Americans | 66 | 47 | 16 | 3 | 271 | 211 | 97 |
| x-Bossier-Shreveport Mudbugs | 66 | 37 | 26 | 3 | 229 | 193 | 77 |
| x-Tulsa Oilers | 66 | 35 | 25 | 6 | 242 | 234 | 76 |
| x-Texas Brahmas | 66 | 34 | 27 | 5 | 227 | 228 | 73 |
| x-Odessa Jackalopes | 66 | 31 | 28 | 7 | 241 | 238 | 69 |
| x-Mississippi RiverKings | 66 | 30 | 31 | 5 | 199 | 229 | 65 |
| x-Arizona Sundogs | 66 | 25 | 31 | 10 | 204 | 253 | 60 |
| x-Rio Grande Valley Killer Bees | 66 | 25 | 35 | 6 | 194 | 232 | 56 |
| Laredo Bucks | 66 | 24 | 34 | 8 | 194 | 228 | 56 |

x – Qualified for playoffs; y – Won division; z – Won regular season league title After games of March 27, 2011.

== Awards and records ==
=== Awards ===
Regular Season
| Player | Award | Awarded |
|---|---|---|
| Brett Smith | CHL Oakley Player of the Week | October 18, 2010 |
| Brian Foster | Sher-Wood CHL Goaltender of the Month (October) | November 4, 2010 |
| David Rutherford | CHL Oakley Second Star of the Month (October) | November 5, 2010 |
| David Rutherford | CHL Oakley Third Star of the Month (November) | December 7, 2010 |

=== Milestones ===
Regular Season
| Player | Milestone | Reached |

== See also ==
- 2010–11 CHL season
