= 2010–11 Tulsa Oilers season =

Minor league ice hockey team season

2010–11 Tulsa Oilers
- League: 7th Central Hockey League
- Conference: 3rd Berry
- 2010–11 record: 35–25–6
- Home record: 18–13–2
- Road record: 17–12–4
- Goals for: 242
- Goals against: 234

Team information
- Coach: Bruce Ramsay
- Captain: Tyler Fleck
- Alternate captains: Marty Standish; Derek Eastman
- Arena: BOK Center

Team leaders
- Goals: Jack Combs – 40
- Assists: Chad Costello – 50
- Points: Chad Costello – 84
- Penalty minutes: Tyler Fleck – 128
- Plus/minus: Tom Dignard – +18
- Wins: Ian Keserich – 22
- Goals against average: Ian Keserich – 3.36

The 2010–11 Tulsa Oilers season was the 19th season of the CHL franchise in Tulsa, Oklahoma.

== Regular season ==
=== Conference standings ===
Berry Conference	GP	W	L	OTL	GF	GA	Pts
z-Allen Americans	66	47	16	3	271	211	97
x-Bossier-Shreveport Mudbugs	66	37	26	3	229	193	77
x-Tulsa Oilers	66	35	25	6	242	234	76
x-Texas Brahmas	66	34	27	5	227	228	73
x-Odessa Jackalopes	66	31	28	7	241	238	69
x-Mississippi RiverKings	66	30	31	5	199	229	65
x-Arizona Sundogs	66	25	31	10	204	253	60
x-Rio Grande Valley Killer Bees	66	25	35	6	194	232	56
Laredo Bucks	66	24	34	8	194	228	56

x – Qualified for playoffs; y – Won division; z – Won regular season league title After games of March 27, 2011.

== Awards and records ==
=== Awards ===
Regular Season
Player	Award	Awarded
Trevor Cann	Oakley CHL Goaltender of the Week	October 19, 2010
Ian Keserich	Oakley CHL Goaltender of the Week	December 14, 2010
Gary Steffes	CHL All-Rookie Team	March 18, 2011

== Transactions ==
The Oilers have been involved in the following transactions during the 2010–11 season.

Trades
December 6, 2010	To Missouri Mavericks: Future Considerations	To Tulsa: Braden Walls

== Roster ==
No.	Nat	Player	Pos	S/G	Age	Acquired	Birthplace	Contract
11	(United States)	Anthony Battaglia	LW	L	45	2010	Chicago, Illinois	Oilers
90	(Canada)	Michel Beausoleil	F	R	44	2009	Montreal, Québec	
19	(Canada)	Gordon Bell	C	–	45	2009	Westlock, Alberta	
29	(United States)	Brad Best	G	–	46	2009	Tulsa, Oklahoma	Oilers
21	(United States)	Jack Combs	RW	L	37	2010	St. Louis, Missouri	
25	(United States)	Tom Dignard	D	L	38	2010	Reading, Massachusetts	Oilers
5	(United States)	Derek Eastman	D	–	45	2009	St. Paul, Minnesota	
15	(United States)	Sean Erickson	D	–	41	2010	Eden Prairie, Minnesota	
14	(Canada)	Tyler Fleck	D	–	46	2009	Carlyle, Saskatchewan	Oilers
16	(United States)	Tom Fritsche	LW	L	38	2008	Parma, Ohio	Avalanche
67	(Canada)	Derek Hulak	LW	L	35	2009	Saskatoon, Saskatchewan	
31	(United States)	Ian Keserich	G	L	39	2010	Parma, Ohio	Oilers
7	(Canada)	Evan Kotsopoulos	LW	L	41	2010	Unionville, Ontario	Oilers
27	(United States)	RJ Linder	D	R	41	2008	St. Cloud, Minnesota	
10	(United States)	John Mori	F	–	38	2010	Westport, Connecticut	
8	(Canada)	Marty Standish	C	R	46	2008	Kelvington, Saskatchewan	
22	(United States)	Gary Steffes	F	–	38	2010	Grand Blanc, Michigan	Oilers
26	(Canada)	Braden Walls	F	R	40	2010	Calgary, Alberta	Oilers
64	(United States)	Jason Weeks	F	R	40	2010	Seattle, Washington	Oilers

== Affiliates ==
- NHL - Colorado Avalanche
- AHL - Lake Erie Monsters

== See also ==
- 2010–11 CHL season
