= Benjamin Dieudé-Fauvel =

French ice hockey player

- Born: 26 August 1986 (age 39) Bordeaux, France
- Height: 6 ft 2 in (188 cm)
- Weight: 212 lb (96 kg; 15 st 2 lb)
- Position: Defence
- Shot: Left
- Played for: Gothiques d'Amiens; Chamois de Chamonix; Pingouins de Morzine-Avoriaz; Iowa Wild; Boxers de Bordeaux
- National team: France
- NHL draft: Undrafted
- Playing career: 2005–2018

Benjamin Dieudé-Fauvel (born 26 August 1986) is a French retired professional ice hockey defenceman.

== Playing career ==
Undrafted and in the 2014–15 season, Dieude-Fauvel earned his first recall to the American Hockey League in his sixth North American season, playing 20 games with the Iowa Wild. Unsigned over the summer, Dieude-Fauvel opted to continue in the ECHL in agreeing to a one-year contract with the Evansville IceMen on 8 September 2015. During the 2015–16 season, Dieude-Fauvel was unable to cement a role and split time between the IceMen, Rapid City Rush and the Kalamazoo Wings.

On August 15, 2015, Dieude-Fauvel opted to return to the Elmira Jackals of the ECHL, signing a one-year deal.

At the conclusion of the 2016–17 season, splitting the year between the Jackals and the Missouri Mavericks, Dieude-Fauvel was released as a free agent. On July 31, 2017, he signed a one-year contract with his seventh ECHL club, the Wheeling Nailers.

== International play ==
Dieude-Fauvel was named to the France men's national ice hockey team for competition at the 2014 IIHF World Championship.
