= Chris Richards (ice hockey) =

Canadian ice hockey player

- Born: October 10, 1975 (age 50) Cornwall, Ontario, Canada
- Height: 5 ft 10 in (178 cm)
- Weight: 172 lb (78 kg; 12 st 4 lb)
- Position: Centre
- Played for: Indianapolis Ice; Macon Whoopee; New Mexico Scorpions; Austin Ice Bats; Youngstown SteelHounds; Corpus Christi IceRays; Mississippi RiverKings
- NHL draft: Undrafted
- Playing career: 1999–2011

Chris Richards (born November 10, 1975) is a Canadian former professional ice hockey player He last played with the Mississippi RiverKings in the Central Hockey League.

== Awards and honours ==
Award	Year
CCHA All-Tournament Team	1998
CHL All-CHL Team	2006–07
