= Serge Dube =

Canadian ice hockey player and coach

- Born: August 13, 1979 (age 46) Sudbury, Ontario, Canada
- Height: 5 ft 11 in (180 cm)
- Weight: 201 lb (91 kg; 14 st 5 lb)
- Position: Defence
- Shot: Left
- Played for: AHL; San Antonio Rampage; CHL; Laredo Bucks; BNL; Bracknell Bees
- NHL draft: Undrafted
- Playing career: 2002–2011

Serge Dube was born on August 13, 1979, in Greater Sudbury, Canada. He is a Canadian former professional ice hockey defence-man. He was also formerly the head coach of the Laredo Bucks in the Central Hockey League for two seasons through to the 2011–12 season. He played for AHL, San Antonio Rampage, CHL, Laredo Bucks, BNL, Bracknell Bees. His playing career was between 2002 and 2011.

== Career statistics ==
| | | | Regular season | | | | | Playoffs |
| Season | Team | League | GP | G | A | Pts | PIM | GP | G | A | Pts | PIM |
|---|---|---|---|---|---|---|---|---|---|---|---|---|
| 1994–95 | Rayside-Balfour Canadians | NOJHL | 14 | 3 | 8 | 11 | 2 | 2 | 0 | 2 | 2 | 4 |
| 1995–96 | Rayside-Balfour Canadians | NOJHL | 29 | 16 | 16 | 32 | 18 | 14 | 4 | 9 | 13 | 22 |
| 1996–97 | Rayside-Balfour Canadians | NOJHL | 40 | 7 | 30 | 37 | 29 | 8 | 0 | 3 | 3 | 8 |
| 1997–98 | Rayside-Balfour Canadians | NOJHL | 39 | 8 | 25 | 33 | 28 | 8 | 4 | 12 | 16 | 0 |
| 1998–99 | Sudbury Wolves | OHL | 60 | 5 | 17 | 22 | 26 | 4 | 0 | 0 | 0 | 6 |
| 1999–00 | Rayside-Balfour Sabrecats | NOJHL | 38 | 12 | 53 | 65 | 19 | 13 | 6 | 27 | 33 | 8 |
| 2000–01 | Université de Moncton | CIAU | 23 | 1 | 8 | 9 | 20 | — | — | — | — | — |
| 2001–02 | Université de Moncton | CIS | 11 | 1 | 6 | 7 | 2 | — | — | — | — | — |
| 2002–03 | Laredo Bucks | CHL | 64 | 10 | 36 | 46 | 70 | 11 | 2 | 4 | 6 | 8 |
| 2003–04 | Laredo Bucks | CHL | 59 | 18 | 50 | 68 | 39 | 16 | 1 | 10 | 11 | 10 |
| 2004–05 | Bracknell Bees | BNL | 11 | 4 | 5 | 9 | 0 | — | — | — | — | — |
| 2004–05 | Laredo Bucks | CHL | 32 | 4 | 12 | 16 | 12 | 14 | 1 | 7 | 8 | 4 |
| 2005–06 | Laredo Bucks | CHL | 52 | 14 | 41 | 55 | 46 | 15 | 3 | 6 | 9 | 6 |
| 2005–06 | San Antonio Rampage | AHL | 3 | 0 | 0 | 0 | 0 | — | — | — | — | — |
| 2006–07 | Laredo Bucks | CHL | 60 | 16 | 37 | 53 | 48 | 21 | 1 | 11 | 12 | 28 |
| 2007–08 | Laredo Bucks | CHL | 57 | 9 | 37 | 46 | 44 | 11 | 2 | 9 | 11 | 8 |
| 2008–09 | Laredo Bucks | CHL | 57 | 10 | 32 | 42 | 41 | 6 | 1 | 2 | 3 | 9 |
| 2009–10 | Laredo Bucks | CHL | 2 | 0 | 0 | 0 | 0 | — | — | — | — | — |
| 2010–11 | Laredo Bucks | CHL | 45 | 4 | 21 | 25 | 23 | — | — | — | — | — |
| AHL totals | | | 3 | 0 | 0 | 0 | 0 | — | — | — | — | — |
| CHL totals | | | 428 | 85 | 266 | 351 | 323 | 94 | 11 | 49 | 60 | 73 |

== Awards and honours ==
| Award | Year |
|---|---|
| CHL All-Star Team | 2004–05 |
| CHL Most Outstanding Defenceman | 2005–06 |
| CHL All-Star Team | 2006–07 |
| CHL All-Star Team | 2008–09 |

Oil Kings Memorial Shootout Most Valuable Player - May 26, 2019 Team - Mississippi Hockey Division - Rec 3, Tier 3
