= Laredo Bucks =

- City: Laredo, Texas
- League: Central Hockey League
- Conference: Berry
- Founded: 2002; 24 years ago
- Operated: 2002–2012; 14 years ago
- Home arena: Laredo Energy Arena
- Colors: Navy, gold
- Head coach: Serge Dube

Franchise history
- 2002–2012: Laredo Bucks
- 2013–2014: St. Charles Chill

Championships
- Regular season titles: 1 (2003–04)
- Division titles: 5 (2003–04, 2004–05, 2005–06, 2006–07, 2007–08)
- Conference titles: 4 (2003–04, 2004–05, 2005–06, 2006–07)
- Ray Miron President's Cup: 2 (2004, 2006)

The Laredo Bucks were an ice hockey team in the Central Hockey League. The Bucks played in Laredo, Texas, United States at the Laredo Energy Arena, formerly known as the Laredo Entertainment Center. On May 1, 2012, the management, citing declining attendance and revenue reversals, announced that the team would suspend operations for the following season, with hopes of returning or relocating the team. On August 1, it was announced that the Laredo Bucks were sold and moved to St. Charles, Missouri and would be renamed the St. Charles Chill.

== History ==
Arena Ventures, made up of six businessmen, teamed up with the City of Laredo to build a state-of-the-art facility for the Laredo area and South Texas. On August 12, 2002, Laredo voters approved a tax increase to pay for the new arena, which cost $36.5 million. The arena was managed by SMG.

After the success the Central Hockey League has had in South Texas in the previous years, Laredo was encouraged to bring the first professional sports franchise into the city. The Bucks were successful, averaging attendance over 6,200 (78% capacity) in the regular season and nearly 6,500 (81% capacity) in the playoffs. The LEC Arena held 8,002 fans from 2002 to 2007, but was lowered to 6,500 starting with the 2007–08 season. The Bucks claimed the Ray Miron President's Cup (CHL Championship) for the 2003–04 and 2005–06 seasons and the Governor's Cup (regular season championship) in the 2003–04 season. The Bucks won four straight Southern Conference Championships from 2004 to 2007, and Southeast Division Championship for the five seasons (2004 to 2008).

Until August 2007, the Laredo Bucks' AHL affiliate was the San Antonio Rampage of the American Hockey League. From 2002 to 2005 (three seasons), the Bucks were affiliated with the Florida Panthers (National Hockey League). The Bucks' NHL affiliate changed to the Phoenix Coyotes for the 2005–06 season.

=== All-Star games ===
The Bucks also hosted the CHL All-Star game in the 2004–05 season. The Bucks sent several players to the Annual Central Hockey League All-Star Game throughout their history. In the 2002–03 season, Laredo sent forwards Chris Grenville, Eric Schneider, and defenceman Michel Periard to Oklahoma City to compete in the CHL All-Star Game. Chris Grenville captured the hardest shot award at the skills competition. The following season (2003–04), Laredo sent players Patrik Nilson, Serge Dube, Jeff Bes and Brent Cullaton. Cullaton captained the Southern Conference team and captured the fastest skater award, while Nilson won the accuracy shooting award. Coach Terry Ruskowski and his staff coached the Southern Conference because the Bucks had the best winning percentage at the break. In 2005, Laredo sent another three players: Adam Paiment, Jeremy Symington and Brent Cullaton. The North went on to beat the South 14–13 in a shootout. Brent Cullaton won the fastest skater title for the second time in a row. In 2006, coach Ruskowski, forward Jeff Bes, right wing James Hiebert, and defensemen Serge Dube all earned a spot on the all-star team. Jeff Bes won the CHL Southern Conference All-Star MVP in that year for his four-goal effort. The 2006–07 Bucks All-Stars were Ruskowski, Bobby Chaumont, Chris Korchinski, and Adam Rivet. In the 2007–08 season the Bucks had three players voted as starters in the All-Star Game. Jeff Bes (third), Serge Dube (third), and Dustin Traylen (first) represented the Bucks. In the 2008–09 season, the Bucks had two players called to the All-Star Game: Darryl Smith and Sébastien Centomo, with Smith winning the All-Star Game MVP.

The Bucks hosted the CHL All-Star Game in the 2009–10 season for the second time and the first time a CHL team would host the event in the same arena twice (LEC). The format was South Texas (Laredo Bucks, Corpus Christi IceRays, and Rio Grande Valley Killer Bees) against the CHL All-Stars and was held on January 13, 2010.

=== Rosco era ===
Coach Terry "Rosco" Ruskowski coached the Laredo Bucks in all of its franchise history except for the last season, 2011–12, when the team disbanded. In 2007, Ruskowski entered the final year of a four-year contract extension with the Bucks. Ruskowski told the Laredo Morning Times that his tenure was in the hands of Bucks chairman Glenn Hart, owner Julian "Kiki" DeAyala, and team president John Beckelhymer and that he had "full faith" that he will obtain his third contract with the club. Ruskowski's optimism paid off, for he was shortly thereafter given a "lifetime contract" as the Bucks' coach. He resigned four years later amid declining revenues for the team.

=== Franchise's end ===
On May 1, 2012, minority owner Glenn Hart announced that due to declining attendance, the Laredo Bucks would go dormant while still maintaining a license in the Central Hockey League. However, their franchise license was purchased on August 1 and began to play as the St. Charles Chill in the 2013–14 season. The CHL itself would fold in 2014.

In 2018, a new ownership group obtained the rights to the Bucks' name for a junior hockey team. The new team was a charter member of the USA Central Hockey League (USACHL) that began play in October 2018 before the entire league folded less than two months later.

== Season-by-season record ==
| Season | GP | W | L | OTL | GF | GA | Pts | Finish | Playoffs |
|---|---|---|---|---|---|---|---|---|---|
| 2002–03 | 64 | 41 | 17 | 6 | 253 | 184 | 88 | 2nd, Southeast | Lost in conference finals |
| 2003–04 | 64 | 48 | 8 | 8 | 262 | 145 | 104 | 1st, Southeast | Won Ray Miron President's Cup |
| 2004–05 | 60 | 35 | 22 | 3 | 196 | 148 | 73 | 1st, Southeast | Lost in finals |
| 2005–06 | 64 | 43 | 15 | 6 | 237 | 156 | 92 | 1st, Southeast | Won Ray Miron President's Cup |
| 2006–07 | 64 | 42 | 17 | 5 | 219 | 170 | 89 | 1st, Southeast | Lost in finals |
| 2007–08 | 64 | 42 | 19 | 3 | 233 | 161 | 87 | 1st, Southeast | Lost in conference finals |
| 2008–09 | 64 | 36 | 23 | 5 | 214 | 187 | 77 | 2nd, Southeast | Lost in quarterfinals |
| 2009–10 | 64 | 32 | 20 | 12 | 218 | 215 | 76 | 3rd, Southern | Lost in first round |
| 2010–11 | 66 | 24 | 34 | 8 | 194 | 228 | 56 | 8th, Berry | Did not qualify |
| 2011–12 | 66 | 25 | 38 | 3 | 175 | 246 | 53 | 6th, Berry | Did not qualify |

== Year-by-year summary ==
2002–03: The Laredo Bucks did well in their inaugural season, making it to the conference finals in the CHL playoffs.

2003–04: Led by head coach Terry Ruskowski, the Bucks won the CHL Championship in 2004, by defeating the Bossier-Shreveport Mudbugs in overtime of the seventh game. Defenceman Dion Hyman scored a controversial overtime goal to win the championship. The Bucks averaged the highest playoff attendance in minor league hockey throughout the 2004 CHL Playoffs.

2004–05: The Bucks battled from a .500 record at the all-star break to the CHL finals, which they lost to the Colorado Eagles.

2005–06: The Bucks enjoyed yet another successful season, finishing with 92 points (second in CHL) and defeating the Rio Grande Valley Killer Bees, Odessa Jackalopes and the Bossier-Shreveport Mudbugs en route to their second CHL championship in three years.

2006–07: The Bucks once again won the Southeast Division Title with a 42–17–5 mark. The Bucks won playoff series' against division foes Rio Grande Valley, and Corpus Christi, while winning their fourth straight Southern Conference Title against New Mexico. The Bucks fell in the President's Cup Finals in six games to Colorado.

2007–08: The Bucks won their fifth straight Southeast Division title, going 42–19–3 (87 points). Laredo would then sweep the Southern Conference semi-finals against Odessa Jackalopes four games to none, to advance to their sixth straight Southern Conference Finals series, only to lose to the eventual CHL Champion Arizona Sundogs in a seven game series.
2008–09: The Bucks battled through a tough season going through injuries and trades, going 36–23–5 (77 points). Laredo managed to grab the third seed in the Southern Conference without Jeff Bes and face the Odessa Jackalopes in the quarter finals, only to lose in six games.

== Team records ==
Records are as of the conclusion of the 2011–2012 season.

Goals: 46 Jeff Bes (2002–03)
Assists: 78 Jeff Bes (2003–04)
Points: 117 Jeff Bes (2003–04)
Penalty Minutes: 300 Mike Amodeo (2003–04)
GAA: 2.03 Dov Grumet-Morris (2005–06)
SV%: .932 David Guerrera (2003–04)
Career Goals: 219 Jeff Bes
Career Assists: 421 Jeff Bes
Career Points: 640 Jeff Bes
Career Penalty Minutes: 948 James Hiebert
Career Goaltending Wins: 43 David Guerrera
Career Shutouts: 6 David Guerrera
Career Games: 458 Jeff Bes

Playoff Goals: 16 Jeff Bes, 2007 Playoffs
Playoff Assists: 20 Brent Cullaton, Jeff Bes, 2006 Playoffs
Playoff Points: 31 Jeff Bes, 2006 Playoffs
Career Playoff Goals: 42 Jeff Bes
Career Playoff Assists: 62 Jeff Bes
Career Playoff Points: 104 Jeff Bes
Career Playoff Games: 96 Steve Weidlich

== Franchise records ==
- Most Goals in a season: 262 (2003–04)
- Fewest Goals Against in a season: 145 (2003–04)
- Most Points in a season: 104 (2003–04)
- Most Penalty Minutes in a season: 1,883 (2003–04)
- Most Wins in a season: 48 (2003–04)
- Consecutive victories in a season: 21 (2003–04)
- All Time Regular Season Wins: 287
- All Time Regular Season Losses: 121
- All Time Regular Seasons Overtime Losses: 36
- Games Played: 444

== Individual achievements ==
Particular players and personnel that have been recognized numerous times by the CHL

2002–03

CHL Franchise of the Year: Laredo Bucks
Most Outstanding Defenceman: Michel Periard

2003–04

Regular season MVP: Jeff Bes
Rookie of the Year: David Guerrera
Playoff MVP: David Guerrera
Ticket Executive of the Year: Kit Preston

2004–05

Leadership Award: Glenn Hart
Merchandise Franchise of the Year: Michelle Sanchez, Jennifer Beckelhymer, Cindy Cisneros
Soul of Service: Nicole Thompson

2005–06

CHL Most Outstanding Defenceman: Serge Dube
CHL Coach of the Year: Terry Ruskowski
CHL Playoff MVP: Jeff Bes
CHL All-Rookie Team: Adam Rivet
CHL All-Rookie Team: Dov Grumet-Morris
CHL Certified Athletic Trainer of the Year: Bobby Moore
Rick Kozuback Award: Glenn Hart
CHL Broadcaster of the Year: Joe Dominey

2006–07

CHL Game Operations Franchise of the Year: Mario Mecaroni, Danny Gutierrez

2007-08

CHL Corporate Sponsorship Franchise of the Year

2008-09

CHL Rookie of the Year: Darryl Smith
CHL All-Rookie Team: Darryl Smith
CHL All-Star MVP: Darryl Smith
