= Terry Ruskowski =

Canadian ice hockey player

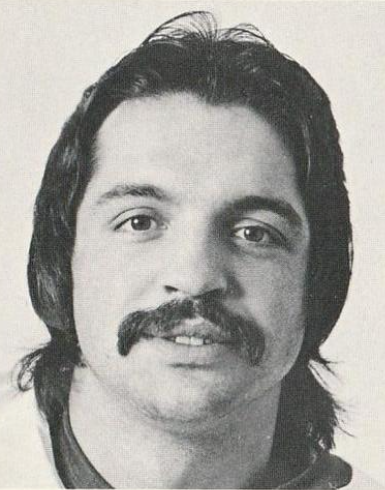
- Ruskowski in 1975
- Born: December 31, 1954 (age 71) Prince Albert, Saskatchewan, Canada
- Height: 5 ft 9 in (175 cm)
- Weight: 168 lb (76 kg; 12 st 0 lb)
- Position: Centre
- Shot: Left
- Played for: Houston Aeros; Winnipeg Jets; Chicago Black Hawks; Los Angeles Kings; Pittsburgh Penguins; Minnesota North Stars
- NHL draft: 70th overall, 1974; Chicago Black Hawks
- WHA draft: 30th overall, 1974; Houston Aeros
- Playing career: 1974–1989

Terry W. Ruskowski (ruhs-KOW-skee; born December 31, 1954) is a Canadian former professional ice hockey centre and coach. He played for the Chicago Black Hawks, Los Angeles Kings, Pittsburgh Penguins, and Minnesota North Stars in the National Hockey League (NHL), and for the Houston Aeros and Winnipeg Jets of the World Hockey Association (WHA). He won the Avco World Trophy with Houston in 1975 and with Winnipeg in 1979. Ruskowski's leadership on the ice was recognized with his tenure as captain of the Aeros, Black Hawks, Kings, and Penguins, the only player in major professional history to captain four clubs.

As a coach, Ruskowski was most recently the head coach and general manager for the Quad City Mallards of the ECHL.

== Playing career ==
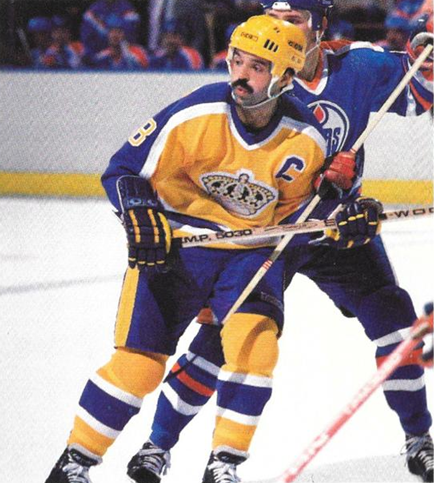
1984 card of Ruskowski for the Los Angeles Kings

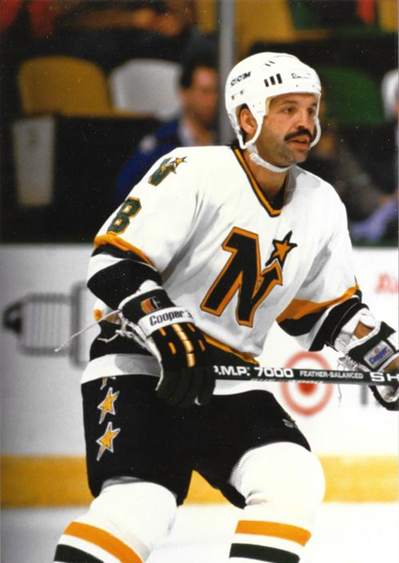
1988 photo of Ruskowski for Minnesota North Stars

Ruskowski played hockey in his native Prince Albert, Saskatchewan until he turned 16 when he became a member of the Humboldt Broncos of the Saskatchewan Tier2 Junior Hockey League in 1970. The following year saw him play in the Western Hockey League with the Swift Current Broncos. In his third season, he scored 40 goals in 68 games. He was drafted in the 1974 WHA amateur draft with the 30th pick in the 2nd round by the Houston Aeros and the 1974 NHL amateur draft as the 70th overall pick by the Chicago Black Hawks. He chose the Aeros over Chicago. Despite a frame of 5'9 and 170 pounds, Ruskowski excelled for the Aeros. He collected 46 points as the Aeros went all the way to the Aero Cup Final. He scored two goals and had an assist in the series against the Quebec Nordiques as they completed the sweep. Ruskowski played the next three seasons with the Aeros. In the 1976 WHA playoffs, he was 6th in points for all players (16 on ten goals and six assists) as the Aeros went back to the Avco Cup Final but lost to the Winnipeg Jets. The following year saw him score six goals and have 11 assists for rank 9th for all players in the postseason despite his team being eliminated in the Western Division Finals. Ruskowski peaked in points with Houston that year with 84 points on 60 assists and 24 goals. In his last season with the Aeros in 1977-78 before the team dissolved, he collected 72 points on 57 assists and 15 goals. He played his next season with the Winnipeg Jets. In July 1978 for the press conference with Scott Campbell, he stated "We're going to show you that Canadians can play hockey, too." He had a career-high season in points with 86 on 66 assists and 20 goals. In eight postseason games that year, he scored one goal and had 12 assists (which led all skaters) for 13 total points; he contributed six of his assists in the Avco Cup Final, the last being an assist on Willy Lindstrom's goal in the third period, which was the last scored by a Jet in the WHA as the Jets won the Cup to make Ruskowski one of few players to win the Avco World Trophy with multiple teams.

In the 1979 NHL expansion draft, Ruskowski's draft rights were reclaimed by the Black Hawks. He recorded 70 points in his first year with the team on 55 assists but declined in his two further seasons, recording 37 points in 60 games in 1981-82. The following year saw him traded to the Los Angeles Kings, where he played three seasons and recorded 40 points twice. He then moved over to the Pittsburgh Penguins in 1985 as a free agent, recording 63 points in his first year and 51 in his second before closing out his career with the Minnesota North Stars. He recorded 17 points in 47 games in his first year before playing just three games in 1988-89. In 999 total professional games, he collected 763 points.

In 1995, he was inducted into the Prince Albert Sports Hall of Fame.

== Coaching career ==
After his retirement, he soon became coach of the Saskatoon Blades of the junior Western Hockey League. Ruskowski was the first ever coach of the Columbus Chill, being hired in 1991. He went 96-70-20 in three seasons, leading them to the playoffs in his final year there. He coached the Houston Aeros in the International Hockey League.

In 2001, Ruskowski was named the head coach of the Laredo Bucks in Laredo, Texas, of the Central Hockey League. On March 18, 2009, he secured his 500th coaching win, as the Bucks defeated the Texas Brahmas of Fort Worth, 4-3, in the Southern Conference playoffs.

In 2007, Ruskowski entered the final year of a four-year contract extension with the Bucks. Ruskowski told the Laredo Morning Times that his tenure was in the hands of Bucks chairman Glenn Hart, owner Julian "Kiki" DeAyala, and team president John Beckelhymer and that he had "full faith" that he will obtain his third contract with the club. He was shortly thereafter given a "lifetime contract" as the coach of the Bucks.

In May 2011, Ruskowski announced his resignation after ten years as the coach of the Bucks. Ruskowski had compiled a 343–175–56 overall record in Laredo and was the CHL "Coach of the Year" during the 2005–06 season. A year after Ruskowski's departure from the Bucks, the team, citing declining attendance and revenue reversals, disbanded.

Ruskowski became the head coach and general manager of the Quad City Mallards in the ECHL in the 2013–14 season. On January 20, 2017, he was relieved of his duties.

== Honours ==
In 2010, Ruskowski was elected as an inaugural inductee into the World Hockey Association Hall of Fame.

== Career statistics ==
			Regular season					Playoffs
Season	Team	League	GP	G	A	Pts	PIM	GP	G	A	Pts	PIM
1971–72	Swift Current Broncos	WCJHL	67	13	38	51	177	—	—	—	—	—
1972–73	Swift Current Broncos	WCJHL	53	25	64	89	136	—	—	—	—	—
1973–74	Swift Current Broncos	WCJHL	68	40	93	133	243	13	5	23	28	23
1974–75	Houston Aeros	WHA	71	10	36	46	134	13	4	2	6	15
1975–76	Houston Aeros	WHA	65	14	35	49	100	16	6	10	16	64
1976–77	Houston Aeros	WHA	80	24	60	84	146	11	6	11	17	67
1977–78	Houston Aeros	WHA	78	15	57	72	170	4	1	1	2	5
1978–79	Winnipeg Jets	WHA	75	20	66	86	211	8	1	12	13	23
1979–80	Chicago Black Hawks	NHL	74	15	55	70	252	4	0	0	0	22
1980–81	Chicago Black Hawks	NHL	72	8	51	59	225	3	0	2	2	11
1981–82	Chicago Black Hawks	NHL	60	7	30	37	120	11	1	2	3	53
1982–83	Los Angeles Kings	NHL	71	14	30	44	127	—	—	—	—	—
1983–84	Los Angeles Kings	NHL	77	7	25	32	89	—	—	—	—	—
1984–85	Los Angeles Kings	NHL	78	16	33	49	144	3	0	2	2	0
1985–86	Pittsburgh Penguins	NHL	73	26	37	63	162	—	—	—	—	—
1986–87	Pittsburgh Penguins	NHL	70	14	37	51	145	—	—	—	—	—
1987–88	Minnesota North Stars	NHL	47	5	12	17	76	—	—	—	—	—
1988–89	Minnesota North Stars	NHL	3	1	1	2	2	—	—	—	—	—
WHA totals			369	83	254	337	761	52	18	36	54	174
NHL totals			630	113	313	426	1,354	21	1	6	7	86

== Personal life ==
Born in Prince Albert, Saskatchewan, Ruskowski began his junior hockey career in Humboldt, Saskatchewan, in the Saskatchewan Junior Hockey League (SJHL - Tier II) in 1970–71, playing for the Humboldt Broncos. His leadership ability at age sixteen was evident, as was his ability and toughness. He helped to propel the Broncos to the league final that year.

From 1971 to 1974, Ruskowski played for the Swift Current Broncos where he became captain in his second and third year and helped to lead the team until it lost in the semi-finals in 1974. As well, he still holds the team record for most assists in one year, 93 assists in 1973–74. He could be expected to stick up for his teammates, a situation which led to many fighting penalties each year.

Ruskowski is married and has two daughters.

Preceded by Keith Magnuson	Chicago Black Hawks captain 1979–1982	Succeeded by Darryl Sutter
Preceded by Dave Lewis	Los Angeles Kings captain 1983–1985	Succeeded by Dave Taylor
Preceded by Mike Bullard	Pittsburgh Penguins captain 1986–1987	Succeeded by Dan Frawley
