= 2011–12 Wichita Thunder season =

Central Hockey League

2011–12 Wichita Thunder
- Governor's Cup champions
- Berry Conference champions
- League: 1st CHL
- Conference: 1st Berry
- 2011–12 record: 44-19-3
- Home record: 24-8-1
- Road record: 20-11-2
- Goals for: 231
- Goals against: 181

Team information
- General manager: Joel Lomurno
- Coach: Kevin McClelland
- Assistant coach: Jason Duda
- Captain: Daniel Tetrault
- Alternate captains: Andrew Martens; Colin Hemingway
- Arena: Intrust Bank Arena
- Average attendance: 6,249

Team leaders
- Goals: Matt Robinson (34)
- Assists: Matt Summers (42)
- Points: Matt Summers (61)
- Penalty minutes: Alex Bourret (168)
- Plus/minus: Jarred Mohr (+22)
- Wins: Adam Russo (27)
- Goals against average: Adam Russo (2.61)

The 2011–12 Wichita Thunder season was the 20th season of the Central Hockey League (CHL) franchise in Wichita, Kansas.

== Off-season ==
During the off-season the Thunder were purchased by Steven Brothers Sports Management, LLC from long time owner Horn Chen. The Thunder resigned eight players from the 2010-11 season.

== Regular season ==
=== Conference standings ===
The Wichita Thunder's 20th Anniversary logo

Updated March 26, 2012.

Berry Conference	GP	W	L	OTL	GF	GA	Pts
Wichita Thunder	66	44	19	3	231	181	91
Allen Americans	66	39	18	9	212	175	87
Texas Brahmas	66	33	25	8	171	170	74
Rio Grande Valley Killer Bees	66	32	27	7	208	200	71
Tulsa Oilers	66	29	29	8	207	222	66
Laredo Bucks	66	25	38	3	175	246	53
Arizona Sundogs	66	19	38	9	175	247	47

== Awards and records ==
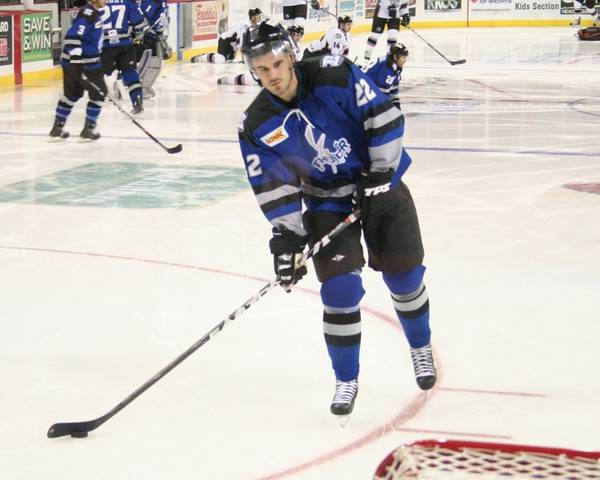
Thunder forward #22 Erick Lizon

=== Awards ===
Regular Season
Player	Award	Awarded
Brett Hemingway	Oakley CHL Player of the Week	October 24, 2011
Matt Summers	Sher-Wood CHL Player of the Month (October)	November 2, 2011
Adam Russo	Oakley CHL Goaltender of the Week	November 27, 2011
Thomas Beauregard	Oakley CHL Player of the Week	December 19, 2011
Adam Russo	Oakley CHL Goaltender of the Week	December 20, 2011
Matt Summers	Oakley CHL Player of the Week	January 2, 2012
Alex Bourret	Sher-Wood CHL Player of the Month (December)	January 5, 2012
Matt Robinson	Oakley CHL Player of the Week	February 20, 2012

== Transactions ==
The Thunder were involved in the following transactions during the 2011–12 season.

Trades

June 16, 2011	To Allen Americans: Kory Scoran; Steve Kaunisto; Troy Schwab	To Wichita: Chris Whitley
July 29, 2011	To Quad City Mallards: Future Considerations	To Wichita: Adam Russo
September 28, 2011	To Fort Wayne Komets: Jesse Bennefield	To Wichita: Craig Cescon; Future Considerations
October 19, 2011	To Rapid City Rush: Future Considerations	To Wichita: Jarred Mohr
October 20, 2011	To Bloomington Blaze: Craig Cescon; Matt Whitehead	To Wichita: Future Considerations
November 17, 2011	To Dayton Gems: Tim Kraus	To Wichita: Future Considerations
January 2, 2012	To Dayton Gems: Robin Richards	To Wichita: Future Considerations

Free agents acquired

Player	Former team	Date
Erick Lizon	Bakersfield Condors	August 5, 2011
Brett Hemingway	Belfast Giants	August 12, 2011
Colin Hemingway	Belfast Giants	August 12, 2011
Thomas Beauregard	Rosenborg IHK	September 7, 2011
Tim Kraus	Las Vegas Wranglers	September 7, 2011
Matt Summers	Mississippi Riverkings	September 7, 2011
Ryan MacDonald	Lausitzer Füchse	September 7, 2011
Justin Sawyer	Odessa Jackalopes	September 21, 2011
Alex Bourret	Ontario Reign	September 28, 2011
Justin Hofstetter	HYC Herentals	October 5, 2011
Kevin Seibel	Rødovre Mighty Bulls	November 9, 2011
Francis Trudel	Sheffield Steelers	January 27, 2012
Kevin Young	Ligue Nord-Américaine de Hockey	March 12, 2012
Garett Bembridge	HC Valpellice	March 22, 2012

Free agents lost

Player	New team	Date
A.J. Gale	Hvidovre	June 5, 2011
Mike Looby	Geleen Eaters	July 13, 2011
Jason Goulet	Arizona Sundogs	August 9, 2011
Bobby Hughes	Tilburg Trappers	August 24, 2011

Players re-signed

Player	Date
Daniel Tetrault	July 15, 2011
Matt Robinson	July 15, 2011
Aaron Davis	July 16, 2011
Andrew Martens	August 5, 2011
Travis Wight	September 7, 2011
Chris Greene	September 21, 2011
Robin Richards	September 21, 2011
Dustin Donaghy	September 21, 2011

Lost via retirement

Player
Brent Cullaton
Marty Magers

Lost via Waivers

Player	Date	New team
Justin Hofstetter	November 9, 2011	Quad City Mallards

== Roster ==
No.	Nat	Player	Pos	S/G	Age	Acquired	Birthplace	Contract
28	(Canada)	Thomas Beauregard	RW	R	39	2011	Montreal, Quebec	Thunder
39	(Canada)	Garett Bembridge	RW	R	43	2012	Melfort, Saskatchewan	Thunder
13	(Canada)	Alex Bourret (A)	RW	L	38	2011	Drummondville, Quebec	Thunder
10	(Canada)	Chris Chappell	LW	L	36	2011	Pickering, Ontario	Rangers
30	(United States)	Scott Darling	G	L	36	2012	Lemont, Illinois	RiverKings
40	(United States)	Aaron Davis	C	L	45	2010	Dearborn Heights, Michigan	Thunder
81	(Canada)	Dustin Donaghy	LW	L	35	2011	Cranbrook, British Columbia	Thunder
18	(United States)	RG Flath	C	R	40	2011	Park City, Utah	Thunder
19	(United States)	Chris Greene (A)	C	R	39	2010	Massena, New York	Thunder
23	(Canada)	Brett Hemingway	RW	R	41	2011	Surrey, British Columbia	Thunder
12	(Canada)	Colin Hemingway	LW	R	44	2011	Regina, Saskatchewan	Thunder
3	(Canada)	Justin Hofstetter	D	L	39	2011	Bright, Ontario	Thunder
30	(United States)	Bryan Hogan	G	R	36	2012	Highland, Michigan	Thunder
18	(United States)	Tim Kraus	C	R	38	2011	Garden Grove, California	Thunder
22	(Canada)	Erick Lizon	RW	R	39	2011	Kitchener, Ontario	Thunder
30	(Canada)	Ryan MacDonald	G	R	39	2011	Chesley, Ontario	Thunder
55	(Canada)	Andrew Martens (A)	D	L	43	2010	Calgary, Alberta	Thunder
39	(United States)	T.J. Miller	D	L	38	2012	Placentia, California	Thunder
26	(Canada)	Jarred Mohr	D	L	40	2011	Regina, Saskatchewan	Thunder
52	(Canada)	Robin Richards	LW	L	39	2010	Winnipeg, Manitoba	Thunder
16	(Canada)	Matt Robinson	LW	L	39	2010	South Surrey, British Columbia	Thunder
1	(Canada)	Adam Russo	G	L	41	2011	Montreal, Quebec	Thunder
29	(Canada)	Justin Sawyer	D	L	39	2011	Oshawa, Ontario	Thunder
5	(Canada)	Kevin Seibel	D	L	41	2011	Swift Current, Saskatchewan	Thunder
91	(United States)	Matt Summers	C	L	38	2011	Savage, Minnesota	Thunder
7	(Canada)	Daniel Tetrault (C)	D	R	45	2010	La Broquerie, Manitoba	Thunder
3	(Canada)	Francis Trudel	D	R	41	2012	Drummondville, Quebec	Thunder
27	(Canada)	Travis Wight	D	L	42	2010	Fannystelle, Manitoba	Thunder
12	(Canada)	Kevin Young	D	R	42	2012	White Rock, British Columbia	Thunder

== See also ==
- 2011–12 CHL season
