= 2012–13 Wichita Thunder season =

2012–13 Wichita Thunder
- League: 2nd CHL
- 2012–13 record: 39-19-8
- Home record: 25-6-2
- Road record: 14-13-6
- Goals for: 240
- Goals against: 182

Team information
- General manager: Joel Lomurno
- Coach: Kevin McClelland
- Assistant coach: Jason Duda
- Captain: Andrew Martens
- Alternate captains: Travis Wight; RG Flath
- Arena: Intrust Bank Arena
- Average attendance: 5,599

Team leaders
- Goals: Neil Trimm (35)
- Assists: Matt Summers (49
- Points: Neil Trimm (76)
- Penalty minutes: Aaron Boogaard (122)
- Wins: Torrie Jung (24)
- Goals against average: Kevin Regan (2.41)

The 2012–13 Wichita Thunder season was the 21st season of the Central Hockey League (CHL) franchise in Wichita, Kansas.

== Off-season ==
The Wichita Thunder announced that the contract for Head Coach Kevin McClelland was extended through the 2014-15 CHL season.

== Regular season ==
=== Conference standings ===
Team	GP	W	L	OTL	GF	GA	Pts
y-Allen Americans	66	39	18	9	210	176	87
x-Wichita Thunder	66	39	19	8	240	182	86
x-Fort Worth Brahmas	66	36	22	8	187	182	80
x-Rapid City Rush	66	35	24	7	177	179	77
x-Missouri Mavericks	66	35	25	6	217	222	76
x-Quad City Mallards	66	34	26	6	219	201	74
x-Arizona Sundogs	66	32	27	7	180	185	71
x-Denver Cutthroats	66	30	26	10	205	215	70
Bloomington Blaze	66	28	36	2	230	246	58
Tulsa Oilers	66	22	39	5	177	254	49

y- Won Governor's Cup
x- Advanced to playoffs

== Awards and records ==
=== Awards ===
Regular Season
Player	Award	Awarded

=== Milestones ===
Regular Season
Player	Milestone	Reached

== Transactions ==
The Thunder have been involved in the following transactions during the 2012–13 season.

Trades

May 17, 2012	To Rapid City Rush: Justin Sawyer	To Wichita: Completed previous deal that brought Jarred Mohr to Wichita.
August 17, 2012	To Arizona Sundogs: Adam Russo	To Wichita: Future Considerations

Free agents acquired

Player	Former team	Date
Neil Trimm	Laredo Bucks	July 11, 2012
David Inman	Laredo Bucks	July 20, 2012
Aaron Boogaard	Rio Grande Valley Killer Bees	July 27, 2012
Torrie Jung	Laredo Bucks	August 10, 2012
Nathan Lutz	Chicago Express	August 24, 2012
Matt Boyd	Laredo Bucks	August 24, 2012
Kevin Regan	HC Valpellice	August 24, 2012
Matt Tassone	Ontario Reign	September 12, 2012
Ian Lowe	Idaho Steelheads	September 12, 2012
Jon Madden	Rio Grande Valley Killer Bees	September 12, 2012
Chad Painchaud	Chicago Express	October 5, 2012
Ryan Sparling	Laredo Bucks	October 5, 2012
Gregor Hanson	Sodertalje SK	October 11, 2012

Free agents lost

Player	New team	Date
Alex Bourret	Cincinnati Cyclones	August 30, 2012
Garrett Bembridge	Nikko Icebucks	September 3, 2012
Thomas Beauregard	Orlando Solar Bears	September 10, 2012
Daniel Tetrault	Evansville IceMen	September 24, 2012

Players re-signed

Player	Date
Matt Robinson	June 15, 2012
RG Flath	July 11, 2012
Travis Wight	July 20, 2012
Erick Lizon	July 27, 2012
Matt Summers	August 17, 2012
Jarred Mohr	August 17, 2012
Andrew Martens	August 24, 2012
Dustin Donaghy	September 20, 2012
Kevin Young	September 20, 2012
Chris Greene	October 5, 2012

Lost via retirement

Player
Aaron Davis

Lost via Waivers

Player	Date	New team

== Player stats ==
=== Skaters ===
Note: Pos = Position; GP = Games played; G = Goals; A = Assists; Pts = Points; PIM = Penalty minutes; +/- = Plus/minus; PPG = Power-play goals; SHG = Short-handed goals; GWG = Game-winning goals

Regular season
Player	GP	G	A	Pts	+/-	PIM
Neil Trimm	66	35	41	76	20	14
Matt Summers	66	17	49	66	27	77
RG Flath	64	27	35	62	30	99
Ian Lowe	66	28	31	59	9	52
Kevin Young	66	24	35	59	16	65
Chad Painchaud	46	20	36	56	21	29
Greger Hanson	44	21	23	44	13	32
Andrew Martens	66	7	35	42	15	34
Dave Inman	57	11	26	37	1	57
Matt Robinson	30	12	17	29	2	18
Nathan Lutz	61	3	23	26	27	56
Les Reaney	47	9	13	22	−11	62
Todd Griffith	25	9	11	20	9	39
Ryan Flanigan	29	4	11	15	1	24
Jarred Mohr	44	3	9	12	−4	24
Travis Wight	66	0	11	11	13	26
Jon Madden	66	1	7	8	−1	80
Erick Lizon	30	2	3	5	−2	75
Dusin Donaghy	43	4	1	5	−13	73
Aaron Boogaard	56	1	4	5	−9	122
Matt Tassone	3	2	0	2	−4	10
Matt Boyd	2	0	1	1	1	2
Totals	66	240	429	669	162	1106

== See also ==
- 2012–13 CHL season
