= Bruno St. Jacques =

Canadian ice hockey player

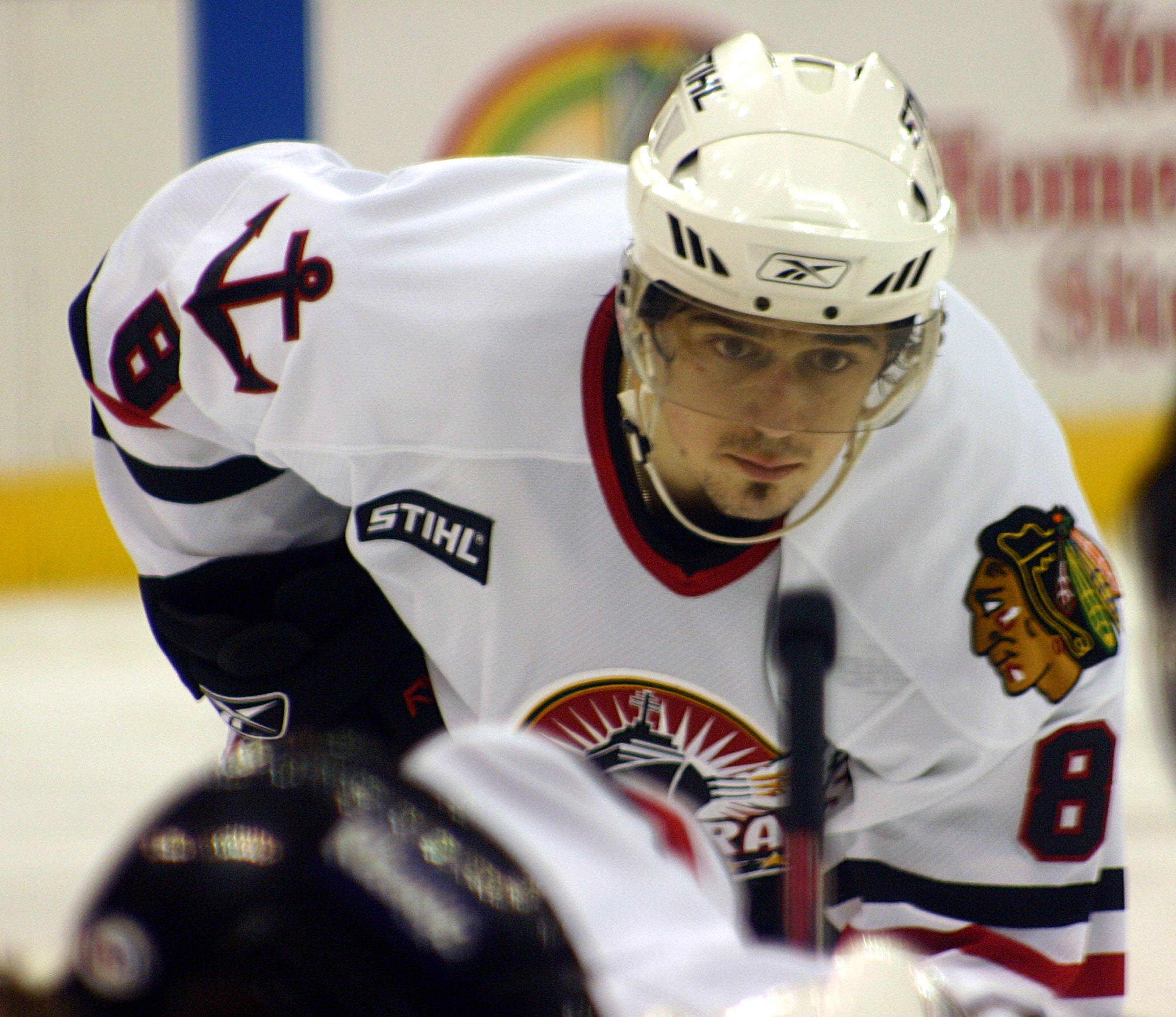
- St. Jacques with the Norfolk Admirals in 2007
- Born: August 22, 1980 (age 45) Montreal, Quebec, Canada
- Height: 6 ft 2 in (188 cm)
- Weight: 210 lb (95 kg; 15 st 0 lb)
- Position: Defence
- Shot: Left
- Played for: Philadelphia Flyers; Carolina Hurricanes; Mighty Ducks of Anaheim; ERC Ingolstadt; Straubing Tigers
- NHL draft: 253rd overall, 1998; Philadelphia Flyers
- Playing career: 2000–2018

Bruno St. Jacques (born August 22, 1980) is a Canadian former professional ice hockey defenceman who played in the National Hockey League (NHL). He played in 67 games over parts of four NHL seasons with the Philadelphia Flyers, Carolina Hurricanes, and Mighty Ducks of Anaheim.

== Playing career ==
St. Jacques was drafted 253rd overall in the ninth round of the 1998 NHL entry draft by the Philadelphia Flyers. A junior from Baie-Comeau Drakkar of the QMJHL, he made his professional debut at the tail end of the 1999–2000 season with Flyers affiliate, the Philadelphia Phantoms of the American Hockey League.

St. Jacques made his NHL debut in the 2000–01 season with the Flyers and spent the next two seasons primarily with the Phantoms before he was traded on February 7, 2003, along with Pavel Brendl to the Carolina Hurricanes for Sami Kapanen and Ryan Bast.

Prior to the 2005–06 season on October 3, St. Jacques was traded by the Hurricanes, to the Mighty Ducks of Anaheim for Craig Adams. In his lone appearance with the Ducks he scored the only goal in a 4–1 defeat to the Minnesota Wild on October 15, 2005. However, he essentially played with AHL affiliate, the Portland Pirates, for the season.

In the 2006–07 season, on December 28, 2006, St. Jacques was traded from the Ducks, along with P. A. Parenteau, to the Chicago Blackhawks in exchange for Sébastien Caron, Matt Keith and Chris Durno. He was then assigned to AHL affiliate, the Norfolk Admirals, for the duration of the year.

On October 4, 2007, St. Jacques signed with the Syracuse Crunch of the AHL for the 2007–08 season. After 13 games with the Crunch, he was loaned to back to the Ducks affiliate, the Portland Pirates on November 15. On December 10, St. Jacques was signed by the Ducks but remained with the Pirates for the year.

On May 27, 2008, St. Jacques left North America and signed with German team, ERC Ingolstadt of the DEL. After three seasons with Ingolstadt, he signed with another DEL team, the Struabing Tigers, on a one-year contract on June 3, 2011.

Upon season end with the Tigers, St. Jacques announced his intention to retire and return to North America. However upon return to Canada, he signed a one-year contract with the semi-professional Jonquière Marquis of the LNAH on July 20, 2012.

== Career statistics ==
			Regular season					Playoffs
Season	Team	League	GP	G	A	Pts	PIM	GP	G	A	Pts	PIM
1997–98	Baie-Comeau Drakkar	QMJHL	63	1	11	12	140	—	—	—	—	—
1998–99	Baie-Comeau Drakkar	QMJHL	49	8	13	21	85	—	—	—	—	—
1999–00	Baie-Comeau Drakkar	QMJHL	60	8	28	36	120	6	0	2	2	10
1999–00	Philadelphia Phantoms	AHL	3	0	1	1	0	1	0	0	0	0
2000–01	Philadelphia Phantoms	AHL	45	1	16	17	83	10	1	0	1	16
2001–02	Philadelphia Flyers	NHL	7	0	0	0	2	—	—	—	—	—
2001–02	Philadelphia Phantoms	AHL	55	3	11	14	59	4	0	0	0	0
2002–03	Philadelphia Phantoms	AHL	30	0	7	7	46	—	—	—	—	—
2002–03	Philadelphia Flyers	NHL	6	0	0	0	2	—	—	—	—	—
2002–03	Lowell Lock Monsters	AHL	8	1	1	2	8	—	—	—	—	—
2002–03	Carolina Hurricanes	NHL	18	2	5	7	12	—	—	—	—	—
2003–04	Lowell Lock Monsters	AHL	6	0	0	0	8	—	—	—	—	—
2003–04	Carolina Hurricanes	NHL	35	0	2	2	31	—	—	—	—	—
2004–05	Lowell Lock Monsters	AHL	68	2	12	14	60	11	1	4	5	4
2005–06	Portland Pirates	AHL	60	6	19	25	55	14	3	4	7	18
2005–06	Mighty Ducks of Anaheim	NHL	1	1	0	1	0	—	—	—	—	—
2006–07	Portland Pirates	AHL	25	1	8	9	26	—	—	—	—	—
2006–07	Norfolk Admirals	AHL	37	4	8	12	33	6	0	2	2	10
2007–08	Syracuse Crunch	AHL	13	0	8	8	16	—	—	—	—	—
2007–08	Portland Pirates	AHL	48	8	12	20	49	6	0	3	3	17
2008–09	ERC Ingolstadt	DEL	41	9	16	25	68	—	—	—	—	—
2009–10	ERC Ingolstadt	DEL	46	9	15	24	137	4	0	1	1	6
2010–11	ERC Ingolstadt	DEL	51	5	7	12	86	1	0	1	1	0
2011–12	Straubing Tigers	DEL	42	6	15	21	87	8	3	1	4	6
2012–13	Jonquière Marquis	LNAH	27	12	21	33	22	11	8	10	18	12
2013–14	Jonquière Marquis	LNAH	30	3	25	28	36	6	1	2	3	6
2014–15	Jonquière Marquis	LNAH	27	7	15	22	26	9	0	9	9	10
2015–16	Laval Prédateurs	LNAH	32	6	17	23	44	10	3	3	6	17
2016–17	Thetford Assurancia	LNAH	31	5	19	24	19	13	0	3	3	16
2017–18	Thetford Assurancia	LNAH	25	2	7	9	33	3	0	0	0	0
NHL totals			67	3	7	10	47	—	—	—	—	—
