= Alex Bourret =

Canadian ice hockey player (born 1986)

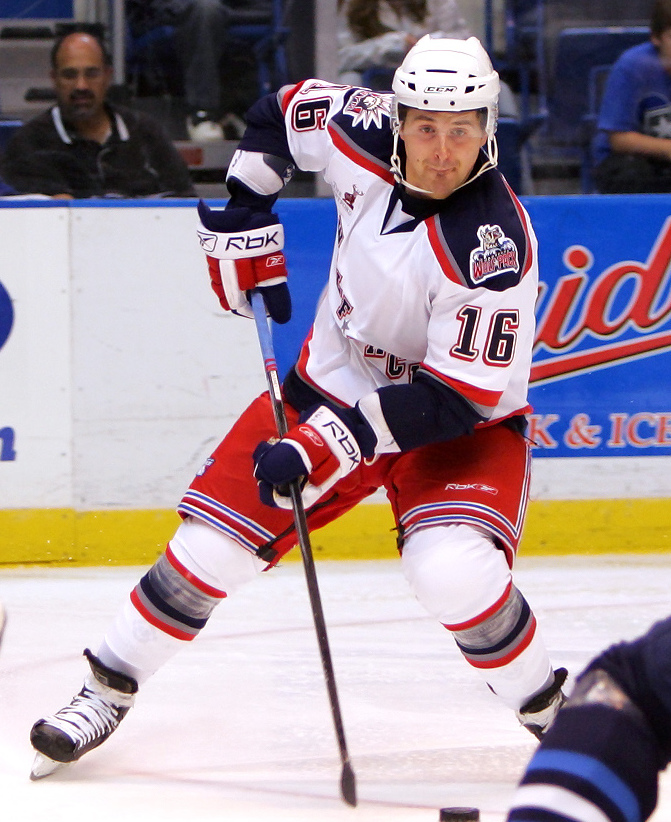
- Bourret with the Hartford Wolf Pack in 2007
- Born: October 5, 1986 (age 39) Drummondville, Quebec, Canada
- Height: 5 ft 11 in (180 cm)
- Weight: 205 lb (93 kg; 14 st 9 lb)
- Position: Right wing
- Shot: Left
- Played for: Chicago Wolves; Hartford Wolf Pack; San Antonio Rampage; HC Kometa Brno; Worcester Sharks
- NHL draft: 16th overall, 2005; Atlanta Thrashers
- Playing career: 2006–2018

Alex Bourret (born October 5, 1986) is a Canadian professional ice hockey right winger who most notably played in the American Hockey League (AHL).

== Playing career ==
His first season in the QMJHL was in the 2002–03 season, where he played with the Sherbrooke Castors. The team moved to Lewiston, Maine the following season. He played the next two seasons with the Lewiston Maineiacs, where he led the team in scoring in the second year, and was selected by Maineiacs fans as the team's most popular player. Wishing to play closer to home, Bourret asked for and received a trade, as the Maineiacs dealt him to the Shawinigan Cataractes in exchange for Stefano Giliati. Bourret's impressive offensive production led to being selected in the first round, 16th overall, of the 2005 NHL entry draft by the Atlanta Thrashers. In 2005–06, Bourret once again led his team in scoring, with 114 points.

On February 26, 2007, Bourret was traded to the New York Rangers in exchange for Pascal Dupuis and a third-round pick in the 2007 NHL entry draft (Robert Bortuzzo). On June 21, 2008, Bourret was traded to the Coyotes for a third-round pick in the 2008 NHL Draft, and after unimpressive work in the AHL was released in September 2009.

On July 7, 2010, after splitting the previous year between Europe and the Las Vegas Wranglers of the ECHL, Bourret signed a one-year deal with High1 of the Asia League Ice Hockey. He left the team in November 2010. In the 2023-2024 season he plays with the Contrecoeur Mustangs.

On September 28, 2011, the Wichita Thunder of the then CHL announced they had signed Bourret for the 2011–12 season.

== Coaching career ==
Effectively ending his professional career during his tenure in the Ligue Nord-Américaine de Hockey, Bourret has coached the Marie-Rivier Canimex Espoir of the QMEAA. Initially joining as an assistant in 2016, Bourret became the head coach the following year.

== Career statistics ==
=== Regular season and playoffs ===
			Regular season					Playoffs
Season	Team	League	GP	G	A	Pts	PIM	GP	G	A	Pts	PIM
2000–01	Magog Cantonniers	QMAAA	35	12	17	29	81	—	—	—	—	—
2001–02	Magog Cantonniers	QMAAA	40	26	34	60	105	—	—	—	—	—
2002–03	Sherbrooke Beavers	QMJHL	61	13	15	28	73	12	1	1	2	10
2003–04	Lewiston Maineiacs	QMJHL	65	22	41	63	94	7	4	5	9	20
2004–05	Lewiston Maineiacs	QMJHL	65	31	55	86	172	8	6	8	14	25
2005–06	Shawinigan Cataractes	QMJHL	67	44	70	114	133	7	3	4	7	14
2006–07	Chicago Wolves	AHL	45	11	21	32	46	—	—	—	—	—
2006–07	Hartford Wolfpack	AHL	23	5	13	18	12	7	3	8	11	2
2007–08	Hartford Wolf Pack	AHL	54	9	24	33	78	5	1	3	4	17
2008–09	San Antonio Rampage	AHL	48	3	11	14	44	—	—	—	—	—
2009–10	Thetford Mines Isothermic	LNAH	2	0	2	2	0	—	—	—	—	—
2009–10	HC Kometa Brno	ELH	16	0	1	1	0	—	—	—	—	—
2009–10	Las Vegas Wranglers	ECHL	36	18	28	46	81	4	2	1	3	0
2010–11	High1	ALH	16	7	6	13	106	—	—	—	—	—
2010–11	Ontario Reign	ECHL	42	12	25	37	68	—	—	—	—	—
2011–12	Wichita Thunder	CHL	43	20	37	57	168	14	5	9	14	14
2011–12	Worcester Sharks	AHL	6	0	3	3	4	—	—	—	—	—
2012–13	Cornwall River Kings	LNAH	31	12	20	32	58	9	0	3	3	35
2012–13	Arlan Kokshetau	KAZ	3	0	0	0	0	—	—	—	—	—
2013–14	Cornwall River Kings	LNAH	20	7	12	19	44	—	—	—	—	—
2013–14	Thetford Mines Isothermic	LNAH	12	1	6	7	33	17	3	6	9	17
2014–15	Wichita Thunder	ECHL	6	2	1	3	6	—	—	—	—	—
2014–15	Thetford Mines Isothermic	LNAH	4	0	2	2	2	—	—	—	—	—
2014–15	Clarenville Caribous	NSHL	2	0	3	3	2	—	—	—	—	—
2014–15	Laval Prédateurs	LNAH	12	2	8	10	26	4	0	1	1	8
2015–16	Laval Prédateurs	LNAH	6	1	8	9	20	—	—	—	—	—
2015–16	Jonquière Marquis	LNAH	32	2	17	19	33	6	0	3	3	6
2016–17	Laval Prédateurs	LNAH	15	1	8	9	27	—	—	—	—	—
2016–17	Trois-Rivières Blizzard	LNAH	12	0	8	8	24	—	—	—	—	—
2017–18	Acton Vale Trackvale	LHSR	4	4	5	9	4	—	—	—	—	—
2017–18	Jonquière Marquis	LNAH	11	4	3	7	24	2	0	0	0	0
AHL totals			176	28	72	100	184	12	4	11	15	19

=== International ===
Year	Team	Event	GP	G	A	Pts	PIM
2003	Canada	U18	5	1	1	2	16
Junior totals			5	1	1	2	16

Awards and achievements
Preceded by Boris Valabik	Atlanta Thrashers first-round draft pick 2005	Succeeded by Bryan Little
