= Éric Bertrand =

Éric Bertrand may refer to:

- Éric Bertrand (ice hockey) (born 1975), Canadian ice hockey player
- Éric Bertrand (footballer) (born 1964), French footballer
