= Éric Bertrand (ice hockey) =

Canadian ice hockey player (born 1975)

- Born: April 16, 1975 (age 51) St. Ephrem, Quebec, Canada
- Height: 6 ft 1 in (185 cm)
- Weight: 209 lb (95 kg; 14 st 13 lb)
- Position: Left wing
- Shoots: Left
- LNAH team Former teams: Saint-Georges Cool FM 103.5; New Jersey Devils; Atlanta Thrashers; Montreal Canadiens; Kölner Haie; Krefeld Pinguine; Kassel Huskies; SønderjyskE
- NHL draft: 207th overall, 1994; New Jersey Devils
- Playing career: 1995–present

Éric Christian Bertrand (born April 16, 1975) is a Canadian professional ice hockey player who is currently playing for Saint-Georges Cool FM 103.5 in the Ligue Nord-Américaine de Hockey. He previously appeared in 15 games in the National Hockey League.

== Playing career ==
Bertrand was drafted 207th overall in the eighth round by the New Jersey Devils in the 1994 NHL entry draft and as well as the Devils, he played for the Atlanta Thrashers and the Montreal Canadiens. He moved to Europe in 2001, playing for the Bracknell Bees in the British Ice Hockey Superleague, but played just eight games for them before moving to Germany's Deutsche Eishockey Liga where he played for the Kölner Haie. He returned to North America with a spell in the American Hockey League for the Hershey Bears before returning to the DEL to play for the Krefeld Pinguine.

He then moved to the Ligue Nord-Americaine de Hockey to play for the Saint-Georges Garaga where he scored 101 points (43 goals and 58 assists) in just 57 games, only Claude Morin (108) scored more points for the team. He once again moved to Germany, this time playing for the Kassel Huskies. He currently plays in the Oddset Ligaen in Denmark for SønderjyskE and won a bronze medal with this team in 2006–07, a bronze medal in 2007–08 and a gold medal in 2008–09.

== Career statistics ==
=== Regular season and playoffs ===
			Regular season					Playoffs
Season	Team	League	GP	G	A	Pts	PIM	GP	G	A	Pts	PIM
1992–93	Granby Bisons	QMJHL	64	10	15	25	82	—	—	—	—	—
1993–94	Granby Bisons	QMJHL	60	11	15	26	151	—	—	—	—	—
1994–95	Granby Bisons	QMJHL	56	14	26	40	268	13	3	8	11	50
1995–96	Albany River Rats	AHL	70	16	13	29	199	4	0	0	0	6
1996–97	Albany River Rats	AHL	77	16	27	43	204	8	3	3	6	15
1997–98	Albany River Rats	AHL	76	20	29	49	256	13	5	5	10	4
1998–99	Albany River Rats	AHL	78	34	31	65	160	5	4	2	6	0
1999–00	New Jersey Devils	NHL	4	0	0	0	0	—	—	—	—	—
1999–00	Atlanta Thrashers	NHL	8	0	0	0	4	—	—	—	—	—
1999–00	Philadelphia Phantoms	AHL	15	3	6	9	67	—	—	—	—	—
1999–00	Milwaukee Admirals	IHL	27	7	9	16	56	3	0	0	0	2
2000–01	Quebec Citadelles	AHL	66	21	21	42	113	9	4	2	6	12
2000–01	Montreal Canadiens	NHL	3	0	0	0	0	—	—	—	—	—
2001–02	Bracknell Bees	BISL	8	4	3	7	4	—	—	—	—	—
2001–02	Kölner Haie	DEL	27	5	6	11	34	12	1	1	2	42
2002–03	Hershey Bears	AHL	67	19	40	59	87	3	0	2	2	4
2003–04	Krefeld Pinguine	DEL	43	7	19	26	79	—	—	—	—	—
2004–05	Saint-Georges-de-Beauce	LNAH	47	36	44	80	26	10	7	14	21	12
2005–06	Kassel Huskies	DEL	41	5	11	16	48	—	—	—	—	—
2006–07	SønderjyskE	DEN	36	20	31	51	68	13	6	4	10	46
2007–08	SønderjyskE	DEN	45	31	36	67	93	13	12	6	18	57
2008–09	SønderjyskE	DEN	28	10	12	22	54	16	6	11	17	38
2009–10	Saint-Georges CRS Express	LNAH	44	17	35	52	59	18	6	15	21	38
2010–11	Saint-Georges COOL-FM	LNAH	41	15	30	45	28	9	4	4	8	4
2011–12	Saint-Georges COOL-FM	LNAH	39	16	33	49	26	—	—	—	—	—
2012–13	Sorel-Tracy Carvena	LNAH	19	8	8	16	16	11	6	3	9	21
2013–14	Sorel-Tracy Éperviers	LNAH	39	20	22	42	40	10	4	1	5	8
2014–15	Saint-Georges COOL-FM	LNAH	40	18	35	53	62	6	0	3	3	10
2015–16	Saint-Georges COOL-FM	LNAH	30	16	15	31	42	5	0	2	2	12
NHL totals			15	0	0	0	4	—	—	—	—	—
