= 2011–12 Texas Brahmas season =

2011–12 Texas Brahmas
- League: 8th CHL
- Conference: 3rd Berry
- 2011–12 record: 33-25-8
- Home record: 22-7-4
- Road record: 11-18-4
- Goals for: 171
- Goals against: 170

Team information
- Coach: Dan Wildfong
- Assistant coach: Ron Vogel
- Arena: NYTEX Sports Centre
- Average attendance: 2,332

Team leaders
- Goals: Chad Woollard (26)
- Assists: T.J. Fox (37)
- Points: Chad Woollard (60)
- Penalty minutes: Ryan Hand (122)
- Plus/minus: T.J. Fox (+21)
- Wins: Mark Guggenberger (22)
- Goals against average: Mark Guggenberger (2.27)

The 2011–12 Texas Brahmas season was the 11th season in the Central Hockey League for the professional ice hockey franchise in North Richland Hills, Texas.

== Regular season ==
=== Conference standings ===
Updated March 26, 2012.

Berry Conference	GP	W	L	OTL	GF	GA	Pts
Wichita Thunder	66	44	19	3	231	181	91
Allen Americans	66	39	18	9	212	175	87
Texas Brahmas	66	33	25	8	171	170	74
Rio Grande Valley Killer Bees	66	32	27	7	208	200	71
Tulsa Oilers	66	29	29	8	207	222	66
Laredo Bucks	66	25	38	3	175	246	53
Arizona Sundogs	66	19	38	9	175	247	47

== See also ==
- 2011–12 CHL season
