= 2011–12 Arizona Sundogs season =

CHL hockey team season

2011–12 Arizona Sundogs
- League: 14th Central Hockey League
- Conference: 7th Berry
- 2011–12 record: 19–38–9
- Home record: 11–17–5
- Road record: 8–21–4
- Goals for: 175
- Goals against: 247

Team information
- Coach: Marco Pietroniro
- Assistant coach: Chris Bartolone
- Captain: Tyler Butler
- Arena: Tim's Toyota Center
- Average attendance: 2,507

Team leaders
- Goals: Craig Macdonald (22); Jean-Philipp Chabot
- Assists: Kyle Hood (35)
- Points: Craig Macdonald (53); Kyle Hood
- Penalty minutes: Adam Smyth (192)
- Plus/minus: Jesse Perrin (+4)
- Wins: Scott Reid (13)
- Goals against average: Scott Reid (3.55)

The 2011–12 Arizona Sundogs season was the sixth season of the Central Hockey League (CHL) franchise in Prescott Valley, Arizona.

== Regular season ==
=== Conference standings ===
Updated March 26, 2012.

Berry Conference	GP	W	L	OTL	GF	GA	Pts
Wichita Thunder	66	44	19	3	231	181	91
Allen Americans	66	39	18	9	212	175	87
Texas Brahmas	66	33	25	8	171	170	74
Rio Grande Valley Killer Bees	66	32	27	7	208	200	71
Tulsa Oilers	66	29	29	8	207	222	66
Laredo Bucks	66	25	38	3	175	246	53
Arizona Sundogs	66	19	38	9	175	247	47

== Awards and records ==
=== Awards ===
Regular Season
Player	Award	Awarded
Tyler Butler	Oakley CHL Player of the Week	January 30, 2012

=== Milestones ===
Regular Season
Player	Milestone	Reached

== Transactions ==
The Sundogs have been involved in the following transactions during the 2011–12 season.

Trades

June 8, 2011	To Missouri Mavericks: Sean Muncy; Clayton Barthel	To Arizona: Completed previous deals that brought Bobby Jarosz and Karl Sellan to Arizona.

Free agents acquired

Player	Former team	Date
Daymen Rycroft	Colorado Eagles	July 6, 2011
Corey Toy	Greenville Road Warriors	October 22, 2011

Free agents lost

Player	New team	Date
Cam Keith	ETC Crimmitschau	May 30, 2011
Jason Visser	Heerenveen Flyers	June 24, 2011
Joey Sides	Heerenveen Flyers	June 24, 2011
Maxime Renaud	Saint-Georges CRS Express	July 11, 2011

Players re-signed

Player	Date
Tyler Butler	May 4, 2011
Luke Erickson	May 10, 2011
Kyle Hood	May 17, 2011

== See also ==
- 2011–12 CHL season
