= 2011–12 Tulsa Oilers season =

2011–12 Tulsa Oilers
- Conference: Berry
- 2011–12 record: 29-29-8
- Home record: 20-8-5
- Road record: 9-21-3
- Goals for: 207
- Goals against: 222

Team information
- General manager: Taylor Hall
- Coach: Bruce Ramsay
- Captain: Tyler Fleck
- Arena: BOK Center
- Average attendance: 4,510

Team leaders
- Goals: Mike Ullrich; Dylan Clarke (29)
- Assists: Jeff Terminesi (37)
- Points: Mike Ullrich; Dylan Clarke (64)
- Penalty minutes: Marty Standish (90)
- Plus/minus: Luke Lucyk (+5)
- Wins: Ian Keserich (21)
- Goals against average: Ian Keserich (3.02)

The 2011–12 Tulsa Oilers season was the 20th season in the Central Hockey League for the professional ice hockey franchise in Tulsa, Oklahoma.

== Regular season ==
=== Conference standings ===
Updated March 26, 2012.

Berry Conference	GP	W	L	OTL	GF	GA	Pts
Wichita Thunder	66	44	19	3	231	181	91
Allen Americans	66	39	18	9	212	175	87
Texas Brahmas	66	33	25	8	171	170	74
Rio Grande Valley Killer Bees	66	32	27	7	208	200	71
Tulsa Oilers	66	29	29	8	207	222	66
Laredo Bucks	66	25	38	3	175	246	53
Arizona Sundogs	66	19	38	9	175	247	47

== See also ==
- 2011–12 CHL season
