= 2011–12 Allen Americans season =

2011–12 Allen Americans
- Conference: Berry
- 2011–12 record: 0-0-0
- Home record: 0-0-0
- Road record: 0-0-0
- Goals for: 0
- Goals against: 0

Team information
- Coach: Dwight Mullins
- Assistant coach: Bill McDonald
- Arena: Allen Event Center

The 2011–12 Allen Americans season was the third season of the Central Hockey League (CHL) franchise in Allen, Texas.

== Regular season ==
=== Conference standings ===
Updated March 26, 2012.

Berry Conference	GP	W	L	OTL	GF	GA	Pts
Wichita Thunder	66	44	19	3	231	181	91
Allen Americans	66	39	18	9	212	175	87
Texas Brahmas	66	33	25	8	171	170	74
Rio Grande Valley Killer Bees	66	32	27	7	208	200	71
Tulsa Oilers	66	29	29	8	207	222	66
Laredo Bucks	66	25	38	3	175	246	53
Arizona Sundogs	66	19	38	9	175	247	47

== Transactions ==
The Americans have been involved in the following transactions during the 2011–12 season.

Trades

June 16, 2011	To Wichita Thunder: Chris Whitley	To Allen: Kory Scoran; Steve Kaunisto; Troy Schwab
June 30, 2011	To Dayton Gems: Nino Musitelli	To Allen: Future Considerations

Free agents acquired

Player	Former team	Date
Brett Clouthier	Rio Grande Valley Killer Bees	July 14, 2011

Free agents lost

Player	New team	Date
Tobias Whelan	Rødovre Mighty Bulls	July 12, 2011
Justin DaCosta	Chamonix HC	July 19, 2011

Players re-signed

Player	Date
Colton Yellow Horn	June 28, 2011
Jarret Lukin	June 29, 2011
Mike Berube	June 30, 2011
Brian McMillin	July 7, 2011
Dylan King	July 22, 2011

== Roster ==
Updated December 4, 2011.

No.	Nat	Player	Pos	S/G	Age	Acquired	Birthplace	Contract
6	(Canada)	Mike Berube	D	L	38	2010	Edmonton, Alberta	Americans
	(Canada)	Brett Clouthier	LW	L	45	2011	Ottawa, Ontario	Americans
21	(Canada)	Bruce Graham	C	L	40	2009	Moncton, New Brunswick	Americans
	(Canada)	Trevor Hendrikx	D	R	41	2011	Russell, Ontario	Americans
	(United States)	Keith Johnson	F	R	41	2011	Windsor, Connecticut	Americans
7	(Canada)	Jarret Lukin	C	L	42	2009	Fort McMurray, Alberta	Americans
17	(Canada)	Lachlan MacIntosh	RW	L	40	2011	Perth-Andover, New Brunswick	Americans
23	(United States)	Brian McMillin	F	R	38	2010	Roseau, Minnesota	Americans
	(Canada)	James Reid	G	L	35	2011	Calgary, Alberta	Americans
15	(Canada)	Colton Yellow Horn	LW	L	39	2009	Brocket, Alberta	Americans

== See also ==
- 2011–12 CHL season
