= Pascal Dupuis =

Canadian ice hockey player (born 1979)

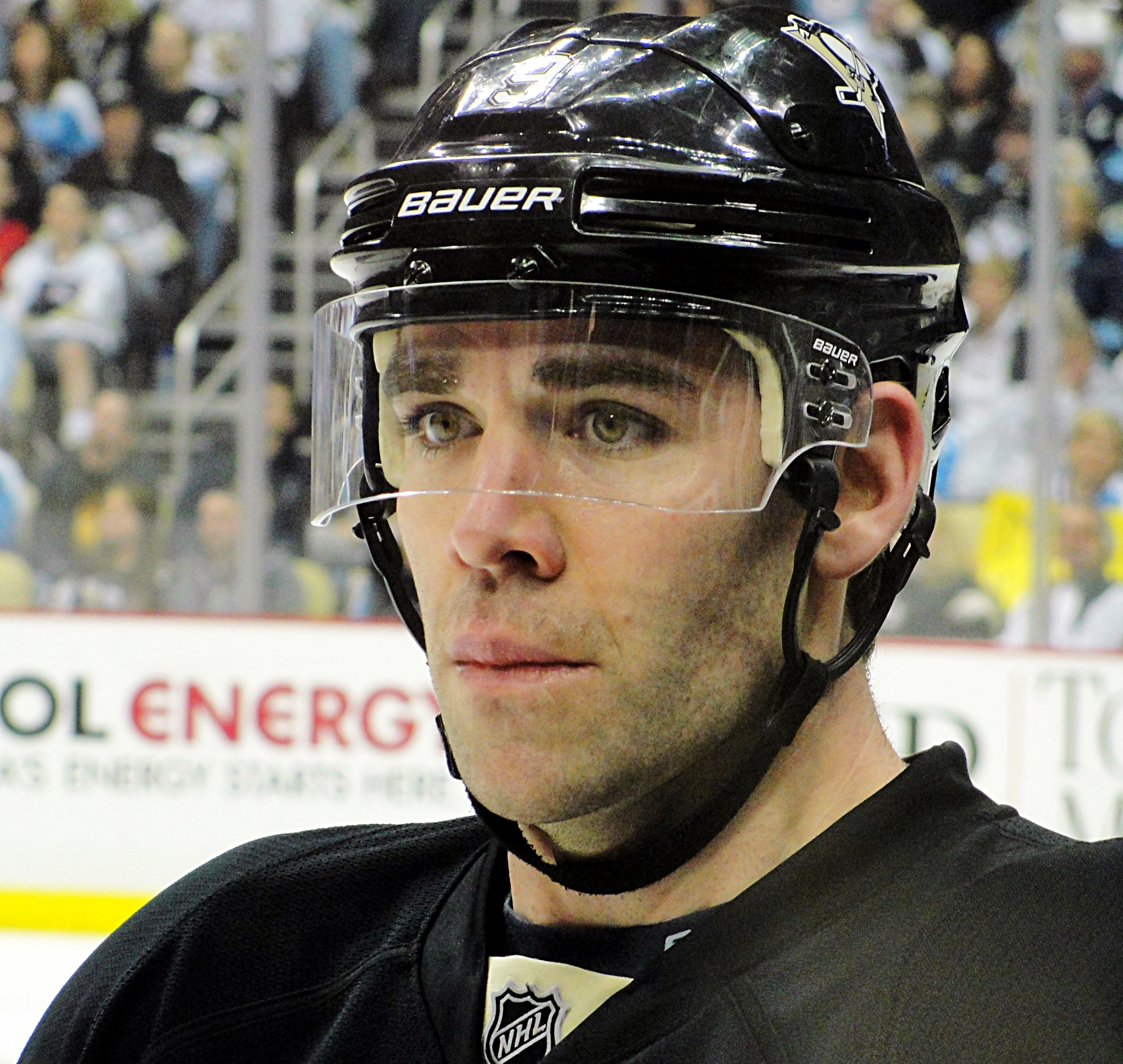
- Dupuis with the Pittsburgh Penguins in 2012
- Born: April 7, 1979 (age 47) Laval, Quebec, Canada
- Height: 6 ft 1 in (185 cm)
- Weight: 205 lb (93 kg; 14 st 9 lb)
- Position: Wing
- Shot: Left
- Played for: Minnesota Wild; New York Rangers; Atlanta Thrashers; Pittsburgh Penguins
- NHL draft: Undrafted
- Playing career: 2000–2016

Pascal Dupuis (born April 7, 1979) is a Canadian ice hockey coach and former professional ice hockey winger who is currently the director of player development for the New York Islanders of the National Hockey League (NHL). Undrafted out of the 1997 NHL entry draft, he played 15 seasons in the NHL for the Minnesota Wild, New York Rangers, Atlanta Thrashers, and the Pittsburgh Penguins.

Born and raised in Laval, Quebec, Dupuis played with the Laval Régents before being drafted by the Rouyn-Noranda Huskies in the Quebec Major Junior Hockey League. In his first season with the Huskies, he fractured his leg which prevented him from being selected in the NHL draft. Dupuis continued his major junior career with the Huskies and the Shawinigan Cataractes, where he broke out offensively. Recording career-highs in goals, assists, and points with the Cataractes, the Minnesota Wild signed him in 2000 after an impressive showing at the Wild training camp.

Dupuis started his professional career assigned to the Wild's International Hockey League affiliate, the Cleveland Lumberjacks. After playing a full season with the Lumberjacks, openings in the Wild's roster due to injuries led to Dupuis making his NHL debut on April 2, 2001. He continued to be a mainstay until 2007, when he was traded to the New York Rangers. Dupuis was quickly dealt again to the Atlanta Thrashers, where he helped the Thrashers make their first and only postseason appearance. The following year, the Thrashers traded him to the Pittsburgh Penguins along with Marián Hossa. Expected to be nothing more than a role player with the Penguins, he contributed heavily to the team, being a part of the 2009 Stanley Cup winning team. Although Dupuis was productive with the Penguins, he started suffering multiple health issues from the 2013–14 season onwards, finally retiring in December 2015 but contractually remaining on the Pittsburgh Penguins’ long-term injury reserve list until the end of the 2016–17 NHL season. He was still considered a part of the 2016 Stanley Cup winning team, being able to hoist the cup.

Post retirement, Dupuis joined the Penguins organization as a part-time scout out of Quebec and as a part of their player development system. He left the organization in 2018 to coach his son's school hockey team, the Lucille-Teasdale Diabolos, leading the team to the Quebec International Pee-Wee Hockey Tournament Scolaire Division finals. In 2020, he joined the Cataractes organization to become a franchise co-owner and the director of hockey operations; he later stepped down from the director of hockey operations and became an assistant coach with the Cataractes. He joined the New York Islanders organization in 2026 as the current director of player development.

== Early life ==
Dupuis was born on April 7, 1979, in Laval, Quebec. His father Claude was a 1974 draft pick of the Quebec Nordiques, who went on to play 120 games in the North American Hockey League with the Maine Nordiques.

As a youth, Dupuis played in the 1993 Quebec International Pee-Wee Hockey Tournament with the Mille-Îles Seigneurs, a minor ice hockey team from the Mille-Îles area of Laval, Quebec.

Dupuis played with the Laval Régents in Quebec Midget AAA hockey for the 1995–96 season, recording 10 goals and 15 assists in 41 games, with his production improving in the playoffs with 11 goals and 11 assists in 14 games. Dupuis played an important part in game four against the Lac St-Louis Lions, scoring two goals, including an equalizer with 1:03 left in the third period to bring the game to overtime. The Régents eventually won the game 6–5 in double overtime.

== Playing career ==
=== Junior ===
The Rouyn-Noranda Huskies of the Quebec Major Junior Hockey League (QMJHL) selected Dupuis in the fourth round, with the 45th overall pick, of the 1996 QMJHL draft. Beginning the 1996–97 season with a shaky Huskies team who moved over the summer from Saint-Hyacinthe as the Laser, draft-eligible Dupuis intended to play every game of the season as a part of his hard work regime. During the season, he fractured his leg, significantly impacting his chances of being taken in the 1997 NHL entry draft. Dupuis eventually returned from the fractured leg and finished the season with 9 goals and 15 assists in 44 games. Despite being projected as a middle-round pick, Dupuis's leg fracture kept him from being drafted in 1997.

Entering the 1997–98 season, Dupuis had received a tryout offer from the Calgary Flames, inviting them to their training camp. Dupuis advanced into the main camp but did not receive an offer from the team. He returned to the Huskies to start the season, recording 9 goals and 17 assists in 39 games, a slight uptick in production from his rookie season. On January 19, 1998, the QMJHL trade deadline, Dupuis was traded to the Shawinigan Cataractes along with defenceman Dany Gauthier in exchange for defenceman Roberto Baldris. Dupuis played well with the Cataractes, recording 7 goals and 13 assists in 28 games. With 40 wins and 24 losses, the Cataractes moved onto the playoffs, losing in six to the Val-d'Or Foreurs in the Lebel division quarterfinals. Dupuis recorded two goals in the playoff series.

The 1998–98 season was Dupuis' first full year with the Cataractes. His production improved greatly over the previous season, albeit with a slower start, having only five assists in the six games beginning the season. By the end of December, he had point-per-game production with 11 goals and 24 assists in 32 games, along with being one of the top players in penalty minutes for the Cataractes. At the end of the season, Dupuis had played 57 games, recording 30 goals and 42 assists to mark his first QMJHL season with above one point-per-game production. He also had a career-high 118 penalty minutes, ranking fourth among Cataractes players. As the best team in the Lebel division, the Cataractes received a bye and were eventually paired against the Hull Olympiques, a series that was lost in six.

Entering the 1999–2000 season as one of the top players on the Cataractes roster, Dupuis quickly cemented himself as one of the top producers on the team, leading the team in goals by the end of November with 19 goals in 31 games. He also recorded 19 assists, placing himself in the top three players by points, with Dominic Forget and Alexandre Tremblay placing ahead of him respectively. In his 200th game in the QMJHL, Dupuis scored two goals against the Sherbrooke Castors in a 5–3 win, and then was suspended for 2 games following the win. In a previous game, Dupuis had been involved in a line brawl with the Val-d'Or Foreurs. Other players and staff were suspended beginning at one game up to five games and fines were issued up to $1,000 CAD. After an eight-point game against the Halifax Mooseheads on March 10, 2000, Dupuis was named QMJHL Offensive Player of the Week on March 14 after recording five goals and seven assists in two games. The Cataractes entered the playoffs on top of the central division in the Lebel conference. Shawinigan first played against the Victoriaville Tigres, winning the series in 6. Dupuis recorded 11 goals and 3 assists in the 6 games. The Cataractes advanced to the conference semifinals against the Drummondville Voltigeurs, losing a close series in 7. Dupuis's production dropped in the conference semifinals, only increasing his point total up to 22 to end the playoffs. Dupuis ended the 1999–2000 season with 50 goals and 55 assists in 61 games, recording production close to two points-per-game.

=== Professional ===
==== Minnesota Wild (2000–2007) ====
At the beginning of the 2000–01 season, Dupuis was invited to the Minnesota Wild rookie tryout camp after being recommended by Wild head scout Tom Thompson. After progressing through the main camp, Dupuis was signed by the Wild on September 18, 2000. Following the signing, Dupuis along with four other players were assigned to the Wild's top minor affiliate in the International Hockey League, the Cleveland Lumberjacks. It took more than a month from the start of the 2000–01 IHL season for Dupuis to begin producing, scoring his first professional goal on November 12 in a 3–0 victory over the Kansas City Blades. That April, near the end of the NHL season, the Wild promoted Dupuis from the Lumberjacks as a replacement for left winger Cam Stewart, who had sustained a leg injury. He made his NHL debut on April 2, 2001, against the San Jose Sharks. During his debut, he scored his first NHL goal to open the game up to 1–0, only elapsing 6:04 in the first period. After four games with the Wild, Dupuis returned to the Lumberjacks. At the team awards banquet, Dupuis was named the Lumberjacks Top Rookie of the Year. The Lumberjacks moved onto the playoffs, where they were swept by the Grand Rapids Griffins in the Turner Cup quarterfinals. By the end of the season, Dupuis had recorded 19 goals and 24 assists in 70 games with the Lumberjacks.

Dupuis entered the 2001–02 season in competition with Matt Johnson, Sylvain Blouin, and Cam Stewart for a left wing role on the Wild. After Stewart suffered a concussion during the preseason, Wild head coach Jacques Lemaire hinted that Dupuis would start the season with the Wild, saying his game would only develop in the NHL. By the beginning of the season, Dupuis had gained a spot on the right wing, partnered with Johnson and Aaron Gavey. Dupuis was slow to begin producing for the second season in a row, recording his first goal 12 games into the season against the New York Rangers in a 1–3 loss. Dupuis continued having regular production until January, where he went the whole month without scoring a goal. Dupuis admitted that he was worried but used the All-Star break as a recharge and following the return, he scored two goals in four games. The Wild's performance forced them to miss the playoffs. Dupuis ended the season with 15 goals and 12 assists in 76 games.

For the 2002–03 season, Dupuis continued to participate in the Wild training camp but did not have to push as hard as the prior year for a roster spot. Dupuis started on the opening night roster along with last season's left wings and newcomer Hnat Domenichelli. He opened up the 2002–03 season on a hot streak, having three goals in three consecutive games, a career-high, and four assists in only nine games. Dupuis continued his hot streak into the end of November, recording three goals and four assists in another nine games. The success was cited by Wild head coach Lemaire from a line that had Dupuis with rookie Pierre-Marc Bouchard and Marián Gáborík. The hot streak by Dupuis eventually subsided but continued to be a productive player on the ice. On January 16, 2003, Dupuis recorded his first two-goal NHL game against the Vancouver Canucks in a 5–3 win. With Dupuis's help, the Wild made their first postseason appearance in franchise history as the sixth seed, matched up against the third-seeded Colorado Avalanche. During the playoffs, Dupuis continued to play on the top line with Bouchard and Gáborík. The Wild won their first series 4–3 and advanced to the Western Conference Semifinals against the Vancouver Canucks, where Dupuis suffered a lower-body injury. Dupuis returned quicker than expected from injury and scored two goals in game seven to secure a 4–2 victory and an advance to the Conference Finals against the Anaheim Mighty Ducks. The Wild were subsequently swept by the Mighty Ducks, leaving Dupuis with 4 goals and 4 assists in 16 playoff games, and 20 goals and 28 assists in 80 regular-season games. This marked a career-high in goals, assists, and points for Dupuis which would not be broken until the 2011–12 season.

On July 1, 2003, the Wild extended a qualifying offer to Dupuis, who was classified as a restricted free agent following the expiration of his three-year entry-level contract. It included a 10-percent raise from the previous contract, an offer that Dupuis would sit on throughout the offseason. On August 25, the Wild resubmitted an offer which would extend Dupuis's tenure with the Wild by four years. Dupuis continued to hold out as negotiations continued between the Wild and his agent, Allan Walsh. He finally signed a three-year, $2.5 million contract on October 24, with up to $1.8 million in potential bonuses depending on his ice time and scoring. He rejoined the team after negotiations ended, missing eight games; he would have a lower point total throughout the season, only having ten points by the end of 2003. On March 5, 2004, in a game against the Los Angeles Kings, Dupuis suffered an ankle injury which forced him out of nine games. His injury was compounded by the flu and a healthy scratch against the Columbus Blue Jackets on March 24, missing a tenth game. Dupuis returned a day later against the Chicago Blackhawks. The Wild failed to qualify for the playoffs despite a deep playoff run the previous year. Dupuis ended the season with 11 goals and 15 assists in 59 games, a drop in points-per-game and games played.

With the 2004–05 NHL lock-out putting a halt on the 2004–05 season, Dupuis joined a four-on-four charity hockey series named the McDonald's Caravan. The series included 40 NHL players such as Roberto Luongo, Mike Ribeiro, and Vincent Damphousse as they toured around Quebec from late October to mid-December. All proceeds from the charity series went to the Ronald McDonald House Charities and other charities in the area, which was able to make more than $44,000 in one stop. On January 13, 2005, Dupuis signed with HC Ajoie in the National League B, the second tier of Swiss hockey. During his 8 appearances with HC Ajoie, he scored 5 goals and provided 5 assists. In 6 relegation-stage games, he recorded 6 goals and 8 assists.

When the NHL returned in 2005–06, Dupuis continued to be a mainstay in the Wild's roster. In late October, he suffered a groin injury which forced him to miss for three games. By late November, he became the player with the most shots without a goal in the season at 43. On November 23, Dupuis broke the streak by scoring 2 goals against the Edmonton Oilers in a 3–4 loss. In January 2006, he suffered a separated shoulder which expected him to be out of play for two weeks. Dupuis returned on February 8 against the Los Angeles Kings, where he and Marián Gáborík together scored 5 powerplay goals in a 5–1 win, a franchise record. The Minnesota Wild failed to make the playoffs for a second year in a row after achieving a 38–36–8 record. Dupuis had 10 goals and 16 assists in 67 games.

During the 2006 offseason, the Minnesota Wild let Dupuis' contract run out, making him a restricted free agent on July 1. On July 14, he re-signed with the Wild on their one-year, $798,000 qualifying offer. He began the 2006–07 season at left wing on the first line with new signing Pavol Demitra and Marián Gáborík. He was knocked out of play after the beginning of the season in October, suffering a sprained knee. In mid-December, Dupuis's relationship with Wild head coach Jacques Lemaire had significantly weakened, with Lemaire's frustration stemming from an incident in which Dupuis and two other players had left practice early. On January 14, reports emerged that the Wild were seeking to trade Dupuis. In 48 games that season, Dupuis had registered 10 goals and 3 assists with the Wild.

==== New York Rangers and Atlanta Thrashers (2007–2008) ====
On February 9, 2007, Dupuis was traded to the New York Rangers in exchange for Adam Hall, marking the Rangers' second trade in five days in an attempt to get back into the Eastern Conference playoff race after mediocre performances in December and January. Tom Renney, the Rangers head coach said that Dupuis was a good fit for the team as a "real sound defensive player", along with his speed and offensive ability being an extra help. Wild general manager Doug Risebrough on February 26 told reporters he made the trade to improve locker room chemistry. Dupuis made his Rangers debut on February 16 against the Carolina Hurricanes in a 4–1 win. He scored his first and only goal with the team via a one-timer pass from Matt Cullen with 16:19 left in the second period, making it a 3–1 game.

On February 27, 2007, he was traded along with the Rangers' third-round pick in the 2007 NHL entry draft to the Atlanta Thrashers for prospect Alex Bourret. As the last trade for the Thrashers at the deadline, Thrashers head coach Bob Hartley commented on the trade saying that Dupuis was a "real fast skater" and that he would help with their penalty-killing unit, which was 28th out of 30th in the league at the time of the trade. Dupuis made his Thrashers debut on March 2 against the Ottawa Senators in a 4–2 win. With 4:56 left in the third period, he scored his first goal with Atlanta by a backhander off a pass from Brad Larsen. Following the trade, Dupuis found himself on the penalty kill with Éric Bélanger, Larsen, and J. P. Vigier, with an improved success rate of 56 out of 62 penalties killed in the first month. After Jon Sim was declared out for a week due to a broken left orbital bone, Dupuis filled in on the first line with Ilya Kovalchuk and Keith Tkachuk. Following the acquisition, the Thrashers made their first and only playoff appearance in franchise history. In the playoffs, Dupuis was slotted into a veteran third line with Bobby Holík and Larsen. Although the third line had the most production through the series, with Dupuis scoring a goal in game one, the Thrashers were swept in the first round by the New York Rangers. This was the first series win for the Rangers since 1997. On July 1, as an unrestricted free agent, Dupuis re-signed with the Thrashers on a one-year deal.

Entering the 2007–08 season, Dupuis continued to play on the third line with rookie Bryan Little and veteran addition Éric Perrin. Dupuis expected to factor in on the penalty kill again, which had ranked 26th the previous season, alongside offseason additions Éric Perrin and Todd White. The Thrashers started out with a six-game losing streak resulting in head coach Bob Hartley being fired. The day after, Dupuis scored his first goal of the season in a 5–2 win over the New York Rangers, the first win of the season. In 62 games, Dupuis recorded 10 goals and 5 assists. He scored his last goal with the Thrashers in a 1–2 loss against the Vancouver Canucks on February 8, 2008, the day before he was traded.

==== Pittsburgh Penguins (2008–2015) ====
On February 9, 2008, Dupuis was traded to the Pittsburgh Penguins, along with Marián Hossa, in exchange for Colby Armstrong, Erik Christensen, Angelo Esposito and their first-round pick in the 2008 NHL entry draft. He scored two goals and 10 assists for 12 points through 16 games with the Penguins as they qualified for the 2008 Stanley Cup playoffs. As the Penguins advanced through the playoffs, Hossa and Dupuis flanked Sidney Crosby as the top line wingers. During their first-round sweep over the Ottawa Senators, Dupuis recorded two assists in four games. The Penguins then faced the New York Rangers in the Eastern Conference semifinals, whom they beat in six games. Dupuis was one of six players to score in the game five of the Eastern Conference Finals against the Philadelphia Flyers to lead the Penguins to the 2008 Stanley Cup Final. Although Dupuis began the Finals playing on the Penguins top-line alongside Crosby and Hossa, he was demoted to the Penguins third line after the team lost game one to the Detroit Red Wings. Dupuis and the Penguins pushed the Red Wings to game six before losing 3–2. Following their loss, Dupuis finished the playoffs with two goals and five assists for seven points through 20 playoff games.

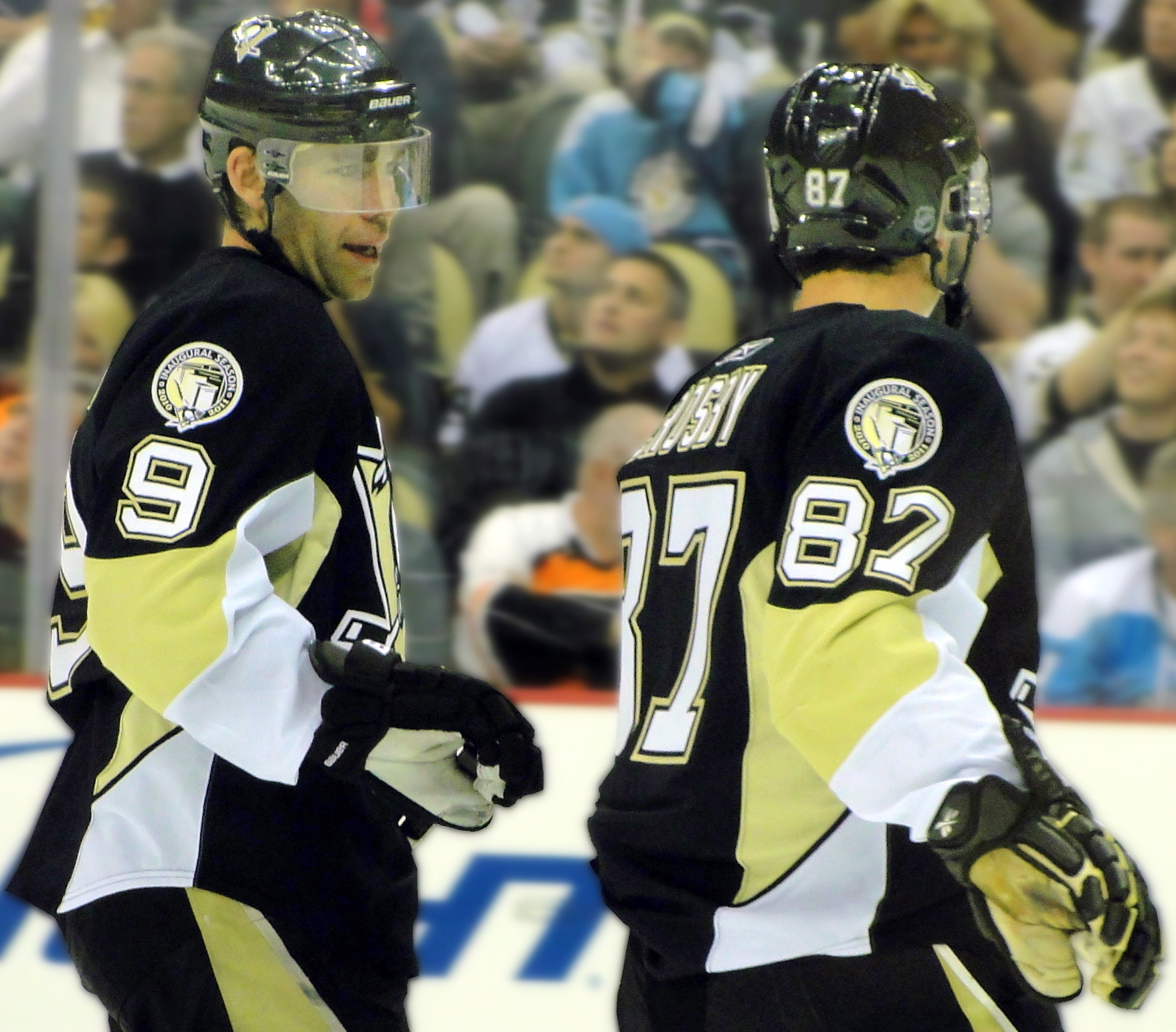
Dupuis chatting with team captain Sidney Crosby in October 2010.

Although Dupuis was eligible for unrestricted free agency following the 2007–08 season, he signed a three-year contract extension on July 1, 2008, to remain with the Penguins. When Dupuis returned to the Penguins for the 2008–09 season, he rejoined the top line alongside Crosby. Winger Miroslav Satan joined the duo on the top line but failed to produce enough points over a five-game trial. In early November, Dupuis suffered a short-term injury in practice which caused him to miss two games. Before his first game back, Dupuis was tested on the left wing of Evgeni Malkin and Petr Sýkora. On December 11, 2008, Dupuis and Sýkora both scored their first NHL hat-tricks in a 9–2 win over the New York Islanders. As the season continued, Dupuis remained on Crosby's wing until head coach Michel Therrien was replaced with Dan Bylsma in February 2009. Under Bylsma, Dupuis fell down the line-up and remained in the bottom six throughout the season. Bylsma and Dupuis later spoke about their conflicts, with Bylsma saying, "When I came here it maybe wasn't the best time for Pascal... There were some things that maybe didn't endear me to Pascal." As the Penguins defeated the Red Wings to win the 2009 Stanley Cup, Dupuis remained pointless over 16 games while being scratched eight times.

Following the Penguins Stanley Cup win, Dupuis was informed by Bylsma that his role with the team depended upon him returning to training camp in better shape. To regain his top-six position, Dupuis added bicycle riding to his off-season training regimen. He returned to the Penguins training camp in better shape and won their annual camp speed test. After going pointless over the Penguin's first six games of the season, Dupuis picked up momentum and collected five points over nine games. He also earned the trust of coach Bylsma and was promoted to the Penguin's second line following an injury to Malkin. While playing on this line, Dupuis scored his 100th career NHL goal on November 14, 2009, against the Boston Bruins. After suffering an injury in a game against the New York Islanders on January 19, 2010, Dupuis missed one game to recover before returning to the Penguins lineup. Once the league resumed following the Olympics break, Dupuis recorded five goals and four assists for nine points over 13 games. His improved play, as well as an injury to Bill Guerin, earned him a promotion to the Penguins top line. He finished the regular season with a career-high 18 goals and 20 assists for 38 points through 81 games. As the Penguins finished 4th in the Eastern Conference standings, they faced the fifth-seed Ottawa Senators in the conference quarter-finals. In game six of the series, Dupuis scored in overtime to help the Penguins eliminate the Senators from the playoffs and advance to the semi-finals. However, the Penguins were then eliminated by the Montreal Canadiens after losing 5-2 in game seven.

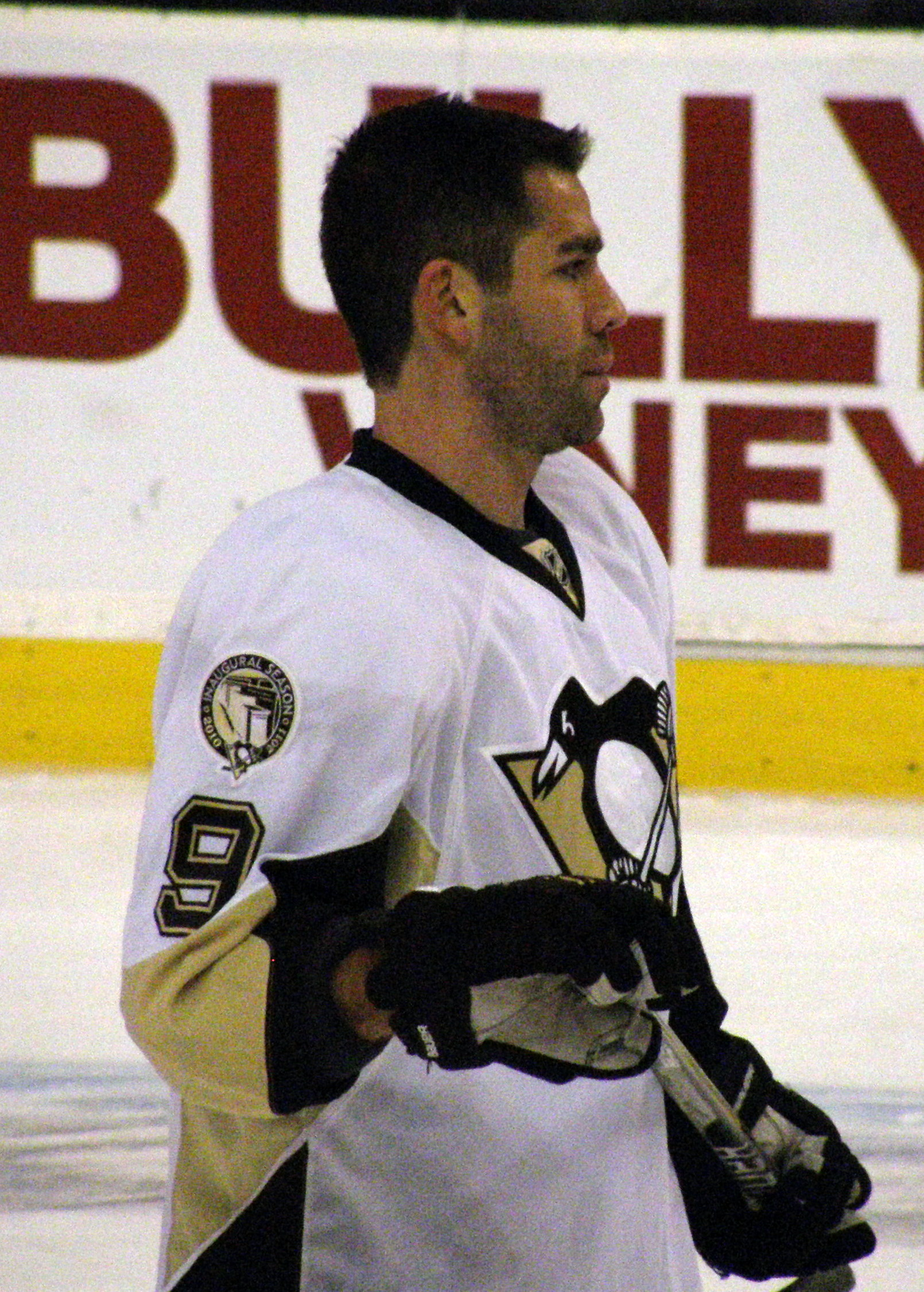
Dupuis with the Penguins in January 2011

Following Guerin's retirement in the 2010 off-season, Dupuis found himself back on Crosby's line full-time, along with Chris Kunitz. The trio immediately found success as a line and helped lead the Penguins to a 13–1–1 record through November, including 10 consecutive wins. While Crosby led the team with 30 goals by the end of December, Dupuis had accumulated four and Kunitz had added seven. On December 18, in an 8–3 win over the Buffalo Sabres, Dupuis recorded his 300th career NHL point. After Crosby suffered a concussion during the 2011 NHL Winter Classic, the team tested Mark Letestu as the new centre between Kunitz and Dupuis. The Penguins eventually replaced Letestu with Evgeni Malkin by the end of January. After the Penguins acquired James Neal from the Dallas Stars at the NHL trade deadline, he became the left winger between Staal and Dupuis on the Penguins' top line. Dupuis finished the regular season with 17 goals and 20 assists for 37 points through 81 games. As the fourth-seeded team, the Penguins qualified for the 2011 Stanley Cup playoffs and faced the Tampa Bay Lightning in the Quarter-finals. Dupuis scored a goal in a losing effort in game six, and the team was eventually eliminated in game seven. On June 28, 2011, Dupuis signed a two-year contract with the Penguins, keeping him through the 2012–13 season.

While Crosby remained out for the majority of the 2011–12 season due to lingering health issues, Dupuis established career-highs in goals with 25, assists with 34, and points with 59 through 82 games. Dupuis started the season with Malkin and Kunitz before returning to Crosby's wing during his brief return in November. When the team deemed Crosby unfit to play again, Dupuis skated on a line with Staal and Steve Sullivan. The trio played so effectively that they stayed together on the Penguins' second line even when Crosby returned in March. The second line combined for 15 goals during the Penguins 11-game winning streak that eventually helped them clinch a spot in the 2012 Stanley Cup playoffs. He finished the regular season on a 17-game point streak that ranked as the third-longest in franchise history and the longest active streak in the NHL's 2011–12 season. Beyond setting new career highs with 25 goals and 34 assists, Dupuis also set career highs in game winning goals with eight and shots on goal with 214. Dupuis joined only four other Penguins players who scored at least 20 goals during the season. He continued his streak to 19 games by adding two more points in Stanley Cup playoffs before the Penguins were eliminated by the rival Philadelphia Flyers.

While the 2012–13 season was delayed due to the NHL lock-out, Dupuis remained in Pittsburgh and trained with various teammates four times a week. They developed an arrangement with a local sporting goods store operator to assist with laundry and other necessities. When the NHL eventually resumed play, Dupuis was reunited with Crosby and Kunitz and played on the team's second power-play unit. During the month of March, Dupuis and the Penguins maintained a 15-game winning streak that was snapped on April 2, 2013. Over this stretch, Dupuis recorded 10 goals and became the first player to record a positive plus-minus rating through a team's 14-game win streak since Brad McCrimmon in 1984. Dupuis finished the lock-out-shortened regular season with 20 goals and 38 points through 48 games and became the first Penguins player since 1995 to lead the NHL in plus-minus. Dupuis continued to score throughout the 2013 Stanley Cup playoffs and set new career-highs in goals and points by the time the Penguins were eliminated. He started the playoffs by recording five goals and two assists through the Penguin's six-game series against the New York Islanders. He added his sixth goal in game one of the Eastern Conference semifinals to secure the league lead in goals. However, Dupuis collected only one assist in the Penguins four-game loss to the Boston Bruins in the Eastern Conference Final. As an impending free agent on July 2, 2013, Dupuis opted to remain in Pittsburgh and signed a four-year, $15 million contract extension.

The 2012–13 season proved to be Dupuis's last before health issues began to mount, ultimately leading to his retirement. While Dupuis started the 2013–14 season healthy, he suffered a season-ending knee injury on December 23, 2013, during a game against the Ottawa Senators. After Crosby was hip-checked by Senators defenceman Marc Methot, Crosby then collided with Dupuis. At the time of the injury, Dupuis had amassed 7 goals and 13 assists over 39 games. Dupuis later theorized that his issues with blood clots began with this injury, saying, "The clot probably started in my calf when my leg was immobilized on the flight back from Ottawa [after my knee injury Dec. 23, 2013]. My lung wasn’t getting blood supply and was slowly dying." Seven weeks later, Dupuis underwent successful surgery to repair his torn anterior cruciate ligament in his right knee. While recovering from the surgery, blood clots were found in his leg and he was placed on blood thinners for six months.

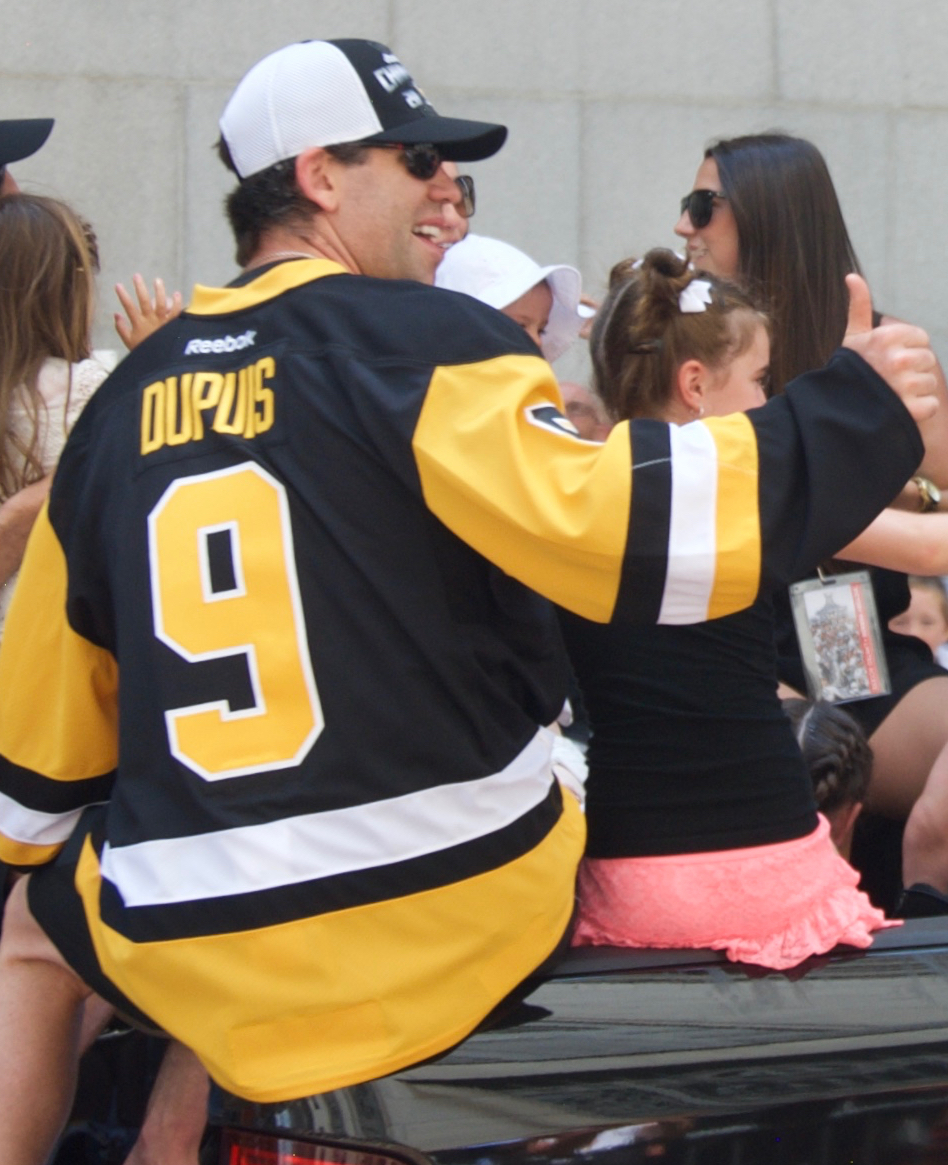
Dupuis during the Penguins Stanley Cup parade in 2016

After recovering from surgery, Dupuis returned to the Penguins line-up for the 2014–15 season. He made his season debut on October 9 with a four-point effort against the Anaheim Ducks but began suffering health issues once again as the season progressed. On October 16, during the second period of a game against the Dallas Stars, Dupuis was crosschecked to the ice by an opponent and while prone was struck by the puck near the back of his neck on a shot by teammate Kris Letang. He was eventually stretchered off the ice. While Dupuis would return to action days later, he began experiencing chest pains in November. Eventually, Dupuis was diagnosed with a blood clot in the lung on November 19 and was expected to miss the remainder of the season to rest and recover. He was also placed on blood thinners for the second time. At the time of this announcement, Dupuis had amassed 6 goals and 11 points through 16 games this season.

Dupuis returned to play in the 2015–16 season, but suffered a lower back injury in October and was expected to miss four to five weeks to recover. He eventually made his regular season debut on October 22 against the Dallas Stars. On December 8, 2015, having twice left games in progress due to ill health, he announced that he was unable to play hockey any longer. He was placed on long-term injury reserve but remained under contract with the Penguins. Dupuis finished his career with the Penguins having recorded 247 points in 452 games over nine seasons.

On February 17, 2016, Dupuis received the inaugural Dapper Dan Courage Award as a "Pittsburgh-area athlete who best exemplifies the meaning of perseverance by overcoming adversity while serving as an inspiration to their teammates or organization." On May 1, 2016, Dupuis was announced as one of the finalists for the Bill Masterton Trophy along with Jaromír Jágr, and Mats Zuccarello. Jágr was announced as the winner on June 22. Although he retired in December, Dupuis was able to lift the Stanley Cup when the Pittsburgh Penguins won it for the fourth time in the 2016 Stanley Cup Final.

== Post-playing career ==
After retiring, Dupuis moved to Blainville, Quebec, with his family. He joined the Penguins organization while still on long-term injury reserve for the 2016–17 season to work as a part-time scout out of Quebec, along with doing player development for the franchise. He also joined TVA Sports as an analyst and commentator for the network throughout 2018, usually being a part of pre-game, post-game, and intermission reports.

On August 11, 2016, the Shawinigan Cataractes retired number 16 for Dupuis, becoming the 11th Cataractes player to have their number retired. On February 4, 2017, a banner with his number was hung up at the Centre Gervais Auto.

In 2018, Dupuis became the head coach for the Lucille-Teasdale Diabolos, the team associated with his son Cody's École Lucille-Teasdale elementary school. As the head coach, he led them in the Quebec International Pee-Wee Hockey Tournament Scolaire Division. The team went 3–0 in the group stage and advanced to the finals of the Scolaire Division playoffs, where they lost to the Nicolas-Gatineau Intrépide. In 2019, he became the assistant coach for the school's M15 AAA Elite hockey program.

In May 2020, it was announced that Dupuis would become a shareholder, and thus co-owner, of the Shawinigan Cataractes. He also became the director of hockey operations for the Cataractes. On November 26, 2023, the Cataractes announced that he would become a permanent assistant coach, replacing Philippe Roy. He had previously served as an assistant coach during the Cataractes' 2022 Memorial Cup run.

On June 23, 2026, the New York Islanders announced the hiring of Dupuis as their director of player development. Islanders' general manager Mathieu Darche said that "Pascal is exactly the kind of person we want shaping the next generation of Islanders", claiming that his perspective will be "invaluable" for developing players.

== Personal life ==
During the 2005 offseason, Dupuis took up the role of Boston Bruins player and coach Milt Schmidt in the 2005 film The Rocket, a biopic about Montreal Canadiens player Maurice Richard. The movie also featured other NHL players such as Vincent Lecavalier, Ian Laperrière, and Mike Ricci.

Dupuis has four children with his wife Carole-Lyne.

== Career statistics ==
			Regular season					Playoffs
Season	Team	League	GP	G	A	Pts	PIM	GP	G	A	Pts	PIM
1995–96	Laval Régents	QMAAA	41	10	15	25		14	11	11	22
1996–97	Rouyn-Noranda Huskies	QMJHL	44	9	15	24	20	—	—	—	—	—
1997–98	Rouyn-Noranda Huskies	QMJHL	39	9	17	26	36	—	—	—	—	—
1997–98	Shawinigan Cataractes	QMJHL	28	7	13	20	10	6	2	0	2	4
1998–99	Shawinigan Cataractes	QMJHL	57	30	42	72	118	6	1	8	9	18
1999–2000	Shawinigan Cataractes	QMJHL	61	50	55	105	164	13	15	7	22	4
2000–01	Minnesota Wild	NHL	4	1	0	1	4	—	—	—	—	—
2000–01	Cleveland Lumberjacks	IHL	70	19	24	43	37	4	0	0	0	0
2001–02	Minnesota Wild	NHL	76	15	12	27	16	—	—	—	—	—
2002–03	Minnesota Wild	NHL	80	20	28	48	44	16	4	4	8	8
2003–04	Minnesota Wild	NHL	59	11	15	26	20	—	—	—	—	—
2004–05	HC Ajoie	NLB	8	5	5	10	26	—	—	—	—	—
2005–06	Minnesota Wild	NHL	67	10	16	26	40	—	—	—	—	—
2006–07	Minnesota Wild	NHL	48	10	3	13	38	—	—	—	—	—
2006–07	New York Rangers	NHL	6	1	0	1	0	—	—	—	—	—
2006–07	Atlanta Thrashers	NHL	17	3	2	5	4	4	1	2	3	4
2007–08	Atlanta Thrashers	NHL	62	10	5	15	24	—	—	—	—	—
2007–08	Pittsburgh Penguins	NHL	16	2	10	12	8	20	2	5	7	18
2008–09	Pittsburgh Penguins	NHL	71	12	16	28	30	16	0	0	0	8
2009–10	Pittsburgh Penguins	NHL	81	18	20	38	16	13	2	6	8	4
2010–11	Pittsburgh Penguins	NHL	81	17	20	37	59	7	1	0	1	2
2011–12	Pittsburgh Penguins	NHL	82	25	34	59	34	6	2	4	6	0
2012–13	Pittsburgh Penguins	NHL	48	20	18	38	26	15	7	4	11	12
2013–14	Pittsburgh Penguins	NHL	39	7	13	20	8	—	—	—	—	—
2014–15	Pittsburgh Penguins	NHL	16	6	5	11	4	—	—	—	—	—
2015–16	Pittsburgh Penguins	NHL	18	2	2	4	12	—	—	—	—	—
NHL totals			871	190	219	409	387	97	19	25	44	56

== Awards and honours ==
Awards	Year(s)	Ref.
NHL
Stanley Cup champion	2009, 2016	
