= 2011–12 Laredo Bucks season =

2011–12 Laredo Bucks
- Conference: Berry
- 2011–12 record: 25-38-3
- Home record: 15-17-1
- Road record: 10-21-2
- Goals for: 175
- Goals against: 246

Team information
- Coach: Serge Dube
- Arena: Laredo Energy Arena
- Average attendance: 2,358

Team leaders
- Goals: Rusty Masters (16); Ryan Sparling; Erik Boisvert
- Assists: Neil Trimm (34)
- Points: Neil Trimm (47)
- Penalty minutes: Justin Styffe (179)
- Plus/minus: A.J. Hau (+1)
- Wins: Torrie Jung (14)
- Goals against average: Torrie Jung (3.50)

The 2011–12 Laredo Bucks season was the 10th season of the Central Hockey League (CHL) franchise in Laredo, Texas.

== Off-season ==
It was announced during the off-season that Serge Dube would be the new head coach replacing Terry Ruskowski.

== Regular season ==
=== Conference standings ===
Updated March 26, 2012.

Berry Conference	GP	W	L	OTL	GF	GA	Pts
Wichita Thunder	66	44	19	3	231	181	91
Allen Americans	66	39	18	9	212	175	87
Texas Brahmas	66	33	25	8	171	170	74
Rio Grande Valley Killer Bees	66	32	27	7	208	200	71
Tulsa Oilers	66	29	29	8	207	222	66
Laredo Bucks	66	25	38	3	175	246	53
Arizona Sundogs	66	19	38	9	175	247	47

== Awards and records ==
=== Awards ===
Regular Season
Player	Award	Awarded
Rusty Masters	Oakley CHL Player of the Week	January 23, 2012
Torrie Jung	Oakley CHL Goaltender of the Week	February 6, 2012

== Transactions ==
The Bucks have been involved in the following transactions during the 2011–12 season.

Free agents acquired
Player	Former team	Date
Kyle Mariani	Halifax Lions	June 28, 2011
Ryan Sparling	Missouri Mavericks	September 3, 2011
Todd Griffith	Missouri Mavericks	September 8, 2011

Free agents lost
Player	New team	Date
Daniel Koger	Cincinnati Cyclones	June 22, 2011
Neil Trimm	Cincinnati Cyclones	June 30, 2011

Players re-signed
Player	Date
Adam Rivet	June 22, 2011
Justin Styffe	June 29, 2011

== Roster ==
Updated September 16, 2011.

No.	Nat	Player	Pos	S/G	Age	Acquired	Birthplace	Contract
	(Canada)	Todd Griffith	F	L	40	2011	Welland, Ontario	Bucks
	(United States)	Joseph Harcharik	C		36	2011	Des Moines, Iowa	Bucks
4	(United States)	David Inman	D	R	38	2011	San Diego, California	Bucks
	(Canada)	Chris Jones	RW	R	39	2011	Dumfries, Scotland	Bucks
31	(Canada)	Torrie Jung	G	L	36	2010	Nanaimo, British Columbia	Bucks
	(United States)	John Kearns	D	R	37	2011	Park Ridge, Illinois	Bucks
	(Canada)	Branden Kosolofsky	LW	L	35	2011	Bon Accord, Alberta	Bucks
	(Canada)	Kyle Mariani	RW	R	36	2011	Toronto, Ontario	Bucks
	(Canada)	Rusty Masters	F	L	39	2011	Grafton, Ontario	Bucks
	(Canada)	Bill McCreary	D		42	2011	Southampton, Ontario	Bucks
	(Canada)	Alex Morton	LW	R	37	2011	Cannington, Ontario	Bucks
	(Canada)	Jordan Oye	F		38	2011	Richmond, British Columbia	Bucks
71	(Canada)	Adam Rivet	D	L	44	2005	Fort Erie, Ontario	Bucks
	(Canada)	Ryan Rondeau	G	R	38	2011	Carvel, Alberta	Bucks
	(Canada)	Ryan Sparling	F	L	36	2011	Sydney, Nova Scotia	Bucks
19	(Canada)	Justin Styffe	LW		40	2009	Okanagan Falls, British Columbia	Bucks

== See also ==
- 2011–12 CHL season
