= Éric Bertrand (footballer) =

French footballer (born 1964)

Personal information
- Date of birth: 30 March 1964 (age 62)
- Place of birth: Metz, France
- Height: 1.76 m (5 ft 9 in)
- Position: Defender

Senior career*
Years	Team	Apps	(Gls)
1984–1992	Nancy		
1992–1995	Metz		
- * Club domestic league appearances and goals

Éric Bertrand (born 30 March 1964) is a French former footballer who played as a defender. (Note: Éric Bertrand at WorldFootball.net)
