= Kevin Seibel =

Canadian ice hockey player

- Born: March 8, 1983 (age 42) Swift Current, Saskatchewan, Canada
- Height: 6 ft 1 in (185 cm)
- Weight: 181 lb (82 kg; 12 st 13 lb)
- Position: Defence
- Shot: Left
- Played for: Wichita Thunder; Tulsa Oilers; Texas Brahmas; Bossier-Shreveport Mudbugs; Odessa Jackalopes; Rødovre Mighty Bulls
- NHL draft: Undrafted
- Playing career: 2008–2012

Kevin Seibel (born March 8, 1983) is a Canadian former professional ice hockey defenceman. Seibel most recently played with the Wichita Thunder of the Central Hockey League.
