= Laval Prédateurs =

- City: Laval, Quebec
- League: Ligue Nord-Américaine de Hockey
- Founded: 2013; 13 years ago
- Operated: 2013; 13 years ago – 2017; 9 years ago
- Home arena: Colisée de Laval
- Colours: Blue, gold, white

Franchise history
- 2013: Valleyfield Braves
- 2013–2014: Laval Braves
- 2014–2017: Laval Prédateurs

The Laval Prédateurs were an ice hockey team based in Laval, Quebec which competed in the Ligue Nord-Américaine de Hockey (LNAH) from 2013 to 2017. Their home arena was the historic Colisée de Laval, built in 1954 and nicknamed the "House of Pain", which seats 3500 spectators. The team originated in the city of Salaberry-de-Valleyfield as the Valleyfield Braves but relocated to Laval due to lackluster attendance and financial issues. The team finished the 2013–14 season as the Laval Braves before being renamed the Laval Laval Prédateurs for the start of the 2014–15 season. On May 31, 2017, it was announced that the Laval Prédateurs would cease operations.

== History ==
The team originated in the city of Salaberry-de-Valleyfield for the 2013–14 season as the Valleyfield Braves but it was announced by the league on November 26, just eleven games into the season, that they would be relocated to Laval due to lackluster attendance and financial issues. The team became the first LNAH team to play in Laval since the Laval Chiefs moved to Saint-Jean-sur-Richelieu in 2006. The Laval Braves finished the regular season in last place and were drawn against the Trois-Rivières Viking in the first round of the playoffs. Viking knocked the Braves out of the playoffs in five games with the Brave only winning game two. Following the end of the season the team was renamed to Laval Laval Prédateurs. The Laval Prédateurs finished the 2014–15 season in seventh place ahead of the Cornwall River Kings. In the playoffs they were drawn against Jonquière Marquis for the quarterfinals and were knocked out in four games. The following season the club finished in fifth place and were drawn against Trois-Rivières Blizzard for the quarterfinals. The Laval Prédateurs defeated the Blizzard four games to three and advanced to the semifinals against Rivière-du-Loup 3L. Rivière-du-Loup knocked the Laval Prédateurs out of the playoffs after winning the semifinals series 2–4. The club finished the 2016–17 regular season in sixth place and qualified for the playoffs. In the quarterfinals the Laval Prédateurs were defeated by Jonquière Marquis two games to four. On May 31, 2017, it was announced that the Laval Prédateurs would cease operations citing the introduction of the American Hockey League's Laval Rocket into the market and a lack of attendance.

== Season-by-season results ==
Season	GP	W	OTL	L	PTS	Finish	Playoff	Ref.
2013–14	40	10	3	27	23	8th	Lost quarterfinals, 1–4 (Trois-Rivières Vikings)	
2014–15	40	16	2	22	34	7th	Lost quarterfinals, 0–4 (Jonquière Marquis)	
2015–16	40	18	3	19	38	5th	Won quarterfinals, 4–3 (Trois-Rivières Blizzard); Lost semifinals, 2–4 (Rivière-du-Loup 3L)	
2016–17	40	16	3	21	35	6th	Lost quarterfinals, 2–4 (Jonquière Marquis)	
