= Kevin Young (ice hockey) =

Canadian ice hockey player

- Born: July 16, 1982 (age 42); White Rock, British Columbia, Canada
- Height: 6 ft 2 in (188 cm)
- Weight: 196 lb (89 kg; 14 st 0 lb)
- Position: Defence
- Shot: Right
- Played for: AHL; Worcester Sharks; ECHL; Colorado Eagles; Allen Americans; Reading Royals; CHL; Bossier-Shreveport Mudbugs; Wichita Thunder; Europe; Hull Stingrays; Nijmegen Devils; EV Landsberg; Lausitzer Füchse; ETC Crimmitschau; Eindhoven Kemphanen; Étoile Noire de Strasbourg
- NHL draft: Undrafted
- Playing career: 2005–2016

Kevin Young (born July 16, 1982) is a Canadian former professional ice hockey defenceman.

== Playing career ==
A native of White Rock, British Columbia, Young spent five seasons of major junior hockey in the Western Hockey League and the Ontario Hockey League. He then went to play CIS hockey with the University of New Brunswick, where in his rookie season he was recognized for his outstanding play when he was awarded the 2004 Clare Drake Award as the CIS Rookie of the Year.

Prior to moving to college, Don Cherry was quoted as saying," Kevin Young is the greatest prospect to come from the Semiahmoo Minor Hockey Association in recent history."

As a professional, Young has played in both North America and Europe, with locations including the Netherlands, Great Britain, Germany, and France.

During the 2012–13 season Young played in the Central Hockey League (CHL) with the Wichita Thunder where he scored 24 goals and 35 assists for 59 points, and was named the CHL's Most Outstanding Defenceman.

On August 29, 2013, the Colorado Eagles of the ECHL signed Young for the 2013–14 season. In 56 games with the Eagles, Young produced 6 goals and 35 points from the blueline before suffering a first round defeat in the playoffs.

On June 12, 2014, Young opted to sign a one-year contract with the Allen Americans of the ECHL. In the 2014–15 season, Young contributed with 8 goals and 44 points from the blueline, ranking 8th in the league amongst defenseman and later helped the American capture their first Kelly Cup Championship.

In the following 2015–16 season, Young was traded after 3 games with the Americans to the Reading Royals in exchange for Jonathan Parker on October 19, 2015.

== Career statistics ==
			Regular season					Playoffs
Season	Team	League	GP	G	A	Pts	PIM	GP	G	A	Pts	PIM
1998–99	Medicine Hat Tigers	WHL	58	1	13	14	19	—	—	—	—	—
1999–00	Portland Winterhawks	WHL	51	4	21	25	60	—	—	—	—	—
2000–01	Portland Winterhawks	WHL	54	4	20	24	108	14	1	4	5	24
2001–02	Kelowna Rockets	WHL	24	5	14	19	43	—	—	—	—	—
2001–02	Portland Winterhawks	WHL	13	4	5	9	23	—	—	—	—	—
2002–03	Brampton Battalion	OHL	47	13	30	43	34	11	0	10	10	6
2003–04	University of New Brunswick	U Sports	28	14	15	29	16	—	—	—	—	—
2004–05	University of New Brunswick	U Sports	12	6	2	8	26	—	—	—	—	—
2005–06	Nijmegen Emperors	Netherlands	40	15	29	44	62	9	4	9	13	14
2006–07	Hull Stingrays	EIHL	30	6	8	14	55	—	—	—	—	—
2007–08	EV Landsberg 2000	Germany2	17	8	5	13	56	—	—	—	—	—
2008–09	Lausitzer Füchse	Germany2	41	7	17	24	80	10	3	7	10	6
2009–10	Eispiraten Crimmitschau	Germany2	38	5	16	21	42	—	—	—	—	—
2010–11	Eindhoven Kemphanen	Netherlands	40	17	48	65	50	3	0	1	1	2
2010–11	Bossier-Shreveport Mudbugs	CHL	8	0	6	6	4	14	0	2	2	4
2011–12	Étoile Noire de Strasbourg	France	23	8	15	23	34	5	0	2	2	6
2011–12	Wichita Thunder	CHL	8	2	2	4	4	16	3	6	9	4
2012–13	Wichita Thunder	CHL	66	24	35	59	65	15	4	13	17	4
2013–14	Colorado Eagles	ECHL	56	6	29	35	36	6	1	3	4	2
2014–15	Allen Americans	ECHL	71	8	36	44	42	25	0	12	12	18
2015–16	Allen Americans	ECHL	3	0	0	0	0	—	—	—	—	—
2015–16	Reading Royals	ECHL	53	7	25	32	21	7	0	1	1	6
ECHL totals			183	21	90	111	99	38	1	16	17	26

== Awards and honours ==
Award	Year
Clare Drake Award - CIS Rookie of the Year	2003–04
Netherlands Best Defenceman	2010–11
All-CHL Team (First Team All-Star)	2012–13
CHL Most Outstanding Defenceman	2012–13
