= Thomas Beauregard =

Canadian professional ice hockey player

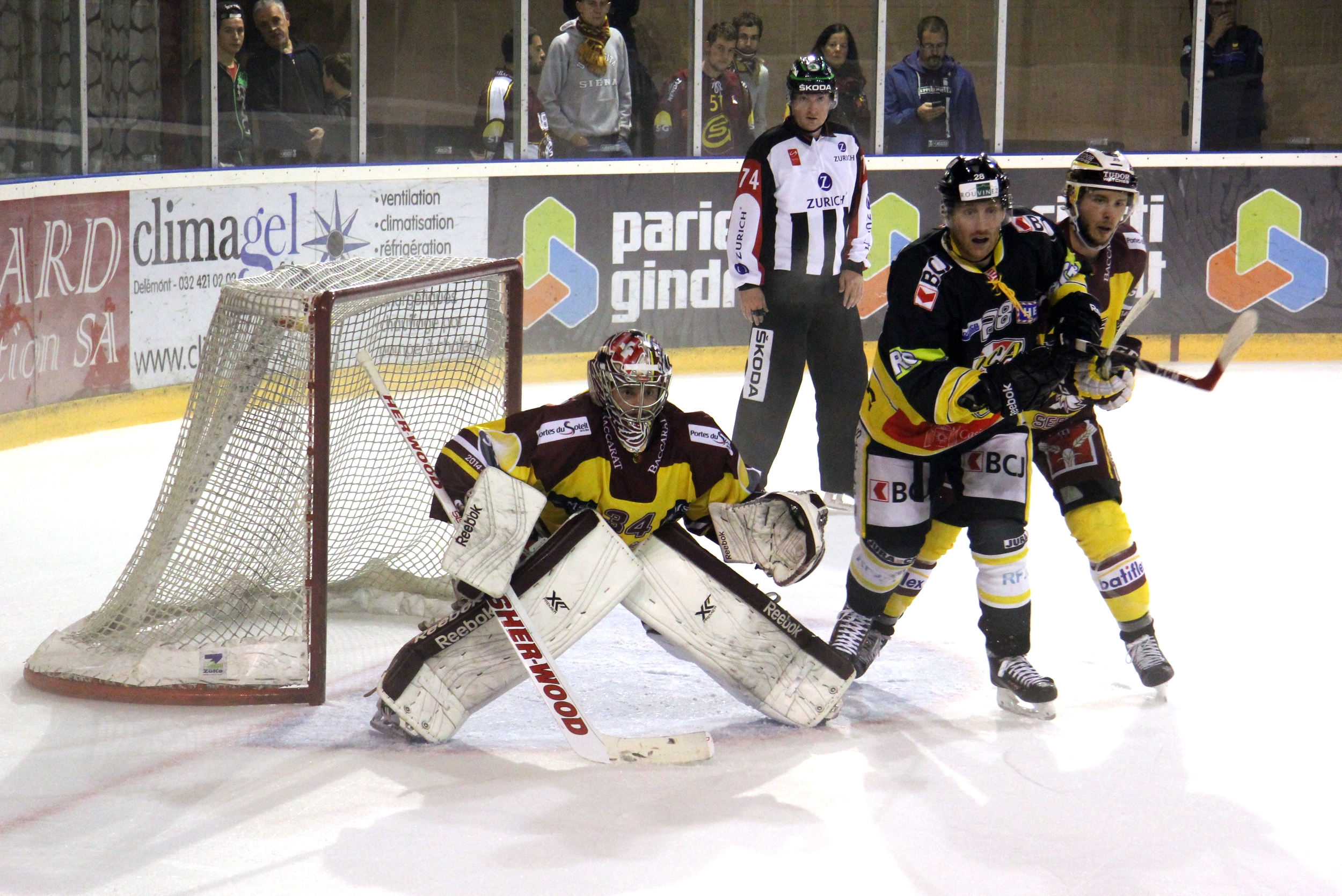
- Born: February 9, 1986 (age 39); Montreal, Quebec, Canada
- Height: 6 ft 0 in (183 cm)
- Weight: 205 lb (93 kg; 14 st 9 lb)
- Position: Right wing
- Shoots: Right
- LNAH team Former teams: Sorel-Tracy Hawks; Hamilton Bulldogs; Springfield Falcons; EfB Ishockey; Rosenborg IHK
- NHL draft: Undrafted
- Playing career: 2007–present

Thomas Beauregard (born February 9, 1986) is a Canadian professional ice hockey player for the Sorel-Tracy Hawks of the Ligue Nord-Américaine de Hockey (LNAH).

== Playing career ==
He played junior hockey for the Acadie-Bathurst Titan of the Quebec Major Junior Hockey League from 2002 to 2007. Undrafted, Beauregard was invited to the Montreal Canadiens training camp in 2007 where he signed a two-year entry-level contract. He spent most of the next two seasons with the Cincinnati Cyclones of the ECHL.

After playing the next season in the ECHL he joined the Wichita Thunder of the Central Hockey League for the 2011–12 season. He later returned to the ECHL and on October 29, 2012, he transferred from the San Francisco Bulls to the Fort Wayne Komets.

On August 22, 2013, Beauregard returned to the CHL, signing a one-year deal with the Tulsa Oilers.

== Career statistics ==
=== Regular season and playoffs ===
			Regular season					Playoffs
Season	Team	League	GP	G	A	Pts	PIM	GP	G	A	Pts	PIM
2002–03	Acadie-Bathurst Titan	QMJHL	48	16	14	30	6	4	0	1	1	2
2003–04	Acadie-Bathurst Titan	QMJHL	65	18	28	46	14	—	—	—	—	—
2004–05	Acadie-Bathurst Titan	QMJHL	5	3	3	6	0	—	—	—	—	—
2005–06	Acadie-Bathurst Titan	QMJHL	69	46	42	88	38	18	13	4	17	6
2006–07	Acadie-Bathurst Titan	QMJHL	69	71	53	124	44	12	5	6	11	6
2007–08	Cincinnati Cyclones	ECHL	59	31	34	65	33	19	9	7	16	20
2008–09	Cincinnati Cyclones	ECHL	25	15	13	28	2	—	—	—	—	—
2008–09	Hamilton Bulldogs	AHL	8	2	1	3	6	—	—	—	—	—
2009–10	Wheeling Nailers	ECHL	57	34	23	57	18	—	—	—	—	—
2009–10	Springfield Falcons	AHL	2	0	1	1	2	—	—	—	—	—
2009–10	Elmira Jackals	ECHL	14	5	5	10	4	5	0	2	2	0
2010–11	EfB Ishockey	DEN	11	4	2	6	2	—	—	—	—	—
2010–11	Rosenborg IHK	GET	32	18	15	33	34	4	1	0	1	12
2011–12	Wichita Thunder	CHL	60	22	37	59	15	16	8	12	20	2
2012–13	San Francisco Bulls	ECHL	5	1	2	3	0	—	—	—	—	—
2012–13	Fort Wayne Komets	ECHL	57	24	10	34	8	—	—	—	—	—
AHL totals			10	2	2	4	8	—	—	—	—	—
