= Garett Bembridge =

Canadian ice hockey player

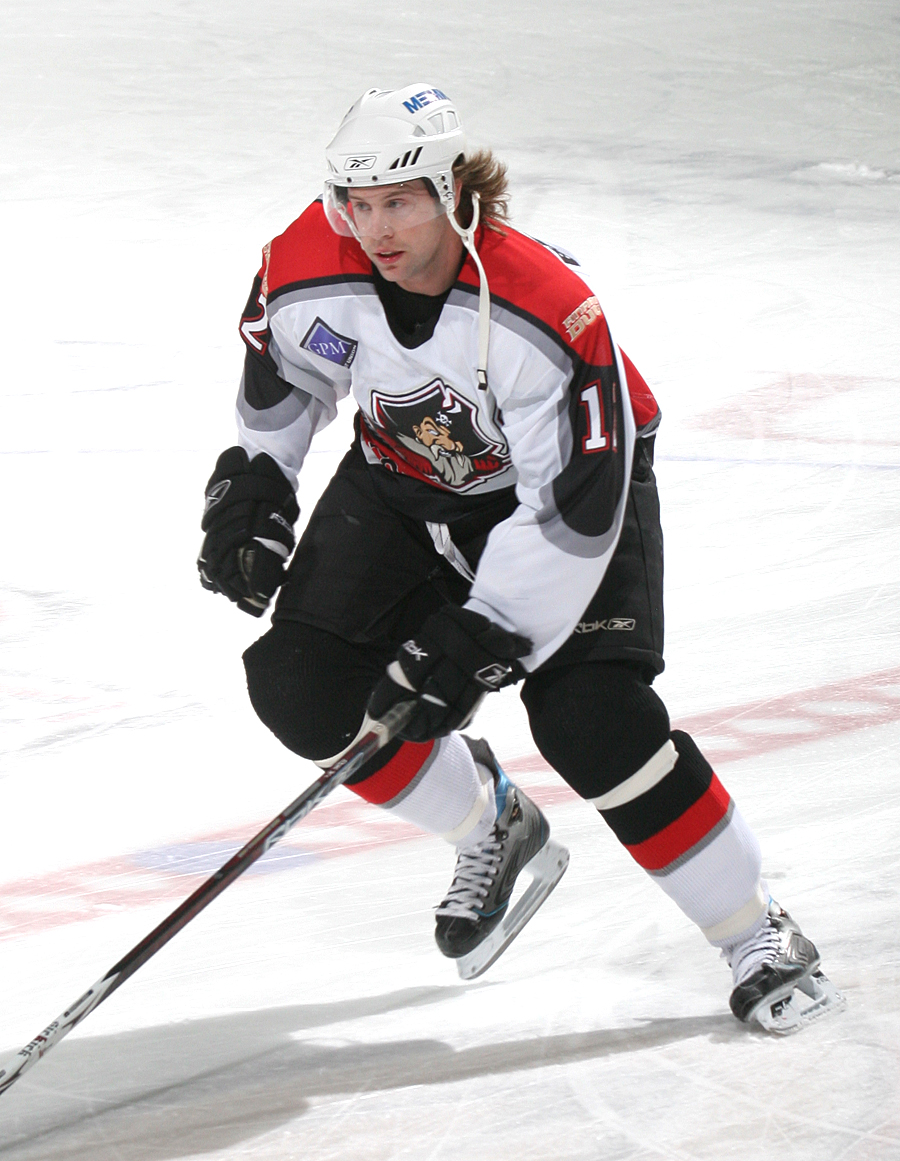
- Bembridge with the Portland Pirates in 2007
- Born: July 6, 1981 (age 44) Melfort, Saskatchewan, Canada
- Height: 6 ft 0 in (183 cm)
- Weight: 190 lb (86 kg; 13 st 8 lb)
- Position: Right wing
- Shot: Right
- SVHL team Former teams: Kenaston Blizzards; Hartford Wolf Pack; Saint John Flames; Lowell Lock Monsters; Syracuse Crunch; Portland Pirates; Iowa Chops; ETC Crimmitschau; Schwenninger Wild Wings; SC Riessersee; HC Valpellice; Nikko Icebucks
- NHL draft: 137th overall, 1999; New York Rangers 207th overall, 2001; Calgary Flames
- Playing career: 2001–2016

Garett Bembridge (born July 6, 1981) is a Canadian former professional ice hockey right winger currently playing for the Kenaston Blizzards of the Sask Valley Hockey League (SVHL).

== Playing career ==
Bembridge was selected by the New York Rangers in the 5th round (137th overall) of the 1999 NHL entry draft, and was also selected by the Calgary Flames in the 7th round (207th overall) of the 2001 NHL entry draft. He spent his Major Junior career with the Saskatoon Blades of the Western Hockey League.

In addition to playing professionally in the Central Hockey League, Bembridge has also played in the American Hockey League, ECHL, the German DEL2, the Italian Serie A, and the Asian ALH.

For the 2013–14 season, Bembridge played for the Denver Cutthroats of the Central Hockey League. During the 2013–14 season, Bembridge scored 42 goals and 104 points in 66 regular season games, setting the Cutthroats' single-season regular season points record. After the regular season, Bembridge was named to the 2013–14 season All-CHL Team, was awarded the Joe Burton Scoring Championship and announced as the Central Hockey League's 2013–14 Most Valuable Player.

On July 9, 2014, Bembridge re-signed with the Cutthroats for the 2014–15 season. On August 20, 2014, the Cutthroats suspended operations, immediately making Bembridge a free agent. Later that same day, he signed with the Missouri Mavericks of the then Central Hockey League. On October 7, 2014, it was announced that the Central Hockey League had folded and had joined the ECHL, nullifying Bembridge's Central Hockey League contract with the team. On October 9, 2014, Bembridge re-signed with the Mavericks under an ECHL contract. After 7 games with the Mavericks, scoring 6 points, Bembridge was traded to inaugural club, the Indy Fuel, on November 12, 2014.

On July 25, 2016, Bembridge left the professional circuit in agreeing to play in a men's senior league in Alberta, with the Rosetown Redwings of the Chinook Hockey League.

== Career statistics ==
			Regular season					Playoffs
Season	Team	League	GP	G	A	Pts	PIM	GP	G	A	Pts	PIM
1996–97	Saskatoon Bandits AAA	SMHL	9	4	5	9	2	1	0	0	0	0
1997–98	Saskatoon Bandits AAA	SMHL	44	29	44	73	34	—	—	—	—	—
1997–98	Saskatoon Blades	WHL	6	1	1	2	0	1	0	0	0	0
1998–99	Saskatoon Blades	WHL	68	23	27	50	30	—	—	—	—	—
1999–2000	Saskatoon Blades	WHL	72	27	31	58	41	11	5	5	10	2
2000–01	Saskatoon Blades	WHL	72	38	40	78	40	—	—	—	—	—
2000–01	Hartford Wolf Pack	AHL	7	1	0	1	0	—	—	—	—	—
2001–02	Saint John Flames	AHL	66	9	12	21	22	—	—	—	—	—
2002–03	Saint John Flames	AHL	64	9	10	19	33	—	—	—	—	—
2003–04	Lowell Lock Monsters	AHL	57	5	9	14	44	—	—	—	—	—
2003–04	Las Vegas Wranglers	ECHL	13	4	3	7	12	2	0	0	0	0
2004–05	Eispiraten Crimmitschau	GER.2	50	23	33	56	102	—	—	—	—	—
2005–06	Idaho Steelheads	ECHL	52	36	39	75	60	7	5	4	9	10
2005–06	Syracuse Crunch	AHL	2	0	0	0	0	—	—	—	—	—
2005–06	Portland Pirates	AHL	19	6	3	9	18	17	3	2	5	10
2006–07	Augusta Lynx	ECHL	38	19	22	41	38	2	0	0	0	4
2006–07	Portland Pirates	AHL	24	5	5	10	14	—	—	—	—	—
2007–08	Schwenninger Wild Wings	GER.2	24	8	6	14	56	—	—	—	—	—
2007–08	Utah Grizzlies	ECHL	38	11	17	28	38	—	—	—	—	—
2008–09	Idaho Steelheads	ECHL	66	20	22	42	62	3	0	0	0	4
2008–09	Iowa Chops	AHL	5	0	0	0	0	—	—	—	—	—
2009–10	SC Riessersee	GER.2	51	27	26	53	77	2	0	0	0	2
2010–11	Eispiraten Crimmitschau	GER.2	48	25	17	42	44	—	—	—	—	—
2011–12	HC Valpellice	ITA	46	18	18	36	50	5	1	1	2	8
2011–12	Wichita Thunder	CHL	3	0	0	0	2	13	1	1	2	2
2012–13	Nikko Icebucks	ALH	42	18	33	51	52	—	—	—	—	—
2013–14	Denver Cutthroats	CHL	66	42	62	104	48	16	6	11	17	12
2014–15	Missouri Mavericks	ECHL	7	2	4	6	2	—	—	—	—	—
2014–15	Indy Fuel	ECHL	62	25	27	52	42	—	—	—	—	—
2015–16	Indy Fuel	ECHL	40	11	13	24	24	—	—	—	—	—
2015–16	Rapid City Rush	ECHL	8	1	1	2	6	—	—	—	—	—
2015–16	Greenville Swamp Rabbits	ECHL	22	3	10	13	14	—	—	—	—	—
2016–17	Rosetown Red Wings	ChHL	16	7	9	16	14	—	—	—	—	—
2017–18	Rosetown Red Wings	ACH	18	5	4	9	18	1	0	1	1	2
2017–18	Rosetown Red Wings	AC	—	—	—	—	—	2	1	0	1	0
2018–19	Rosetown Red Wings	ACH	2	0	0	0	2	—	—	—	—	—
2018–19	Kenaston Blizzard	SVHL	9	8	12	20	12	—	—	—	—	—
2019–20	Kenaston Blizzard	SVHL	19	15	42	57	16	7	7	12	19	6
2021–22	Kenaston Blizzard	SVHL	16	9	30	39	12	7	3	14	17	4
AHL totals			244	35	39	74	131	17	3	2	5	10
ECHL totals			346	132	158	290	298	14	5	4	9	18
GER.2 totals			173	83	82	165	279	11	6	6	12	57

== Awards and honours ==
Award	Year
ECHL Second Team All-Star	2005–06
All-CHL Team	2013–14
CHL Joe Burton Scoring Championship	2013–14
CHL Most Valuable Player	2013–14
