= Erick Lizon =

Canadian ice hockey player

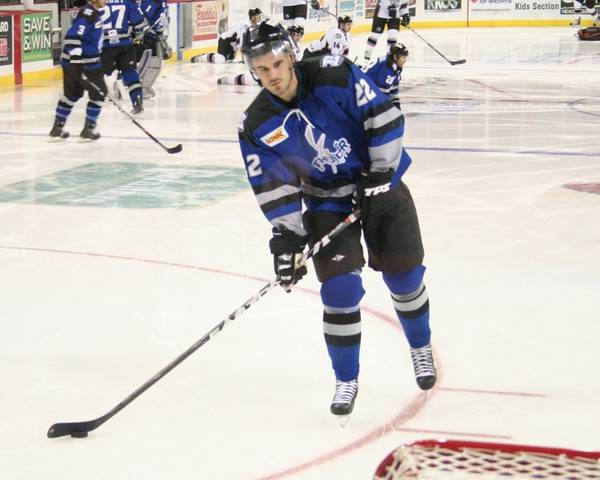
- Erick Lizon (in Wichita Thunder, 2012)
- Born: November 29, 1985 (age 40) Kitchener, Ontario, Canada
- Height: 6 ft 4 in (193 cm)
- Weight: 205 lb (93 kg; 14 st 9 lb)
- Position: Right wing
- Shoots: Right
- Played for: Victoriaville Tigres; Rockford IceHogs; Oklahoma City Blazers; Laredo Bucks; Bakersfield Condors; Worcester Sharks; Wichita Thunder; Oklahoma City Barons
- NHL draft: Undrafted
- Playing career: 2004–present

Erick Lizon (born November 29, 1985) is a Canadian professional ice hockey player who has played in Ontario Junior Hockey League, Quebec Major Junior Hockey League, United Hockey League, Central Hockey League, ECHL, American Hockey League and Ligue Nord-Américaine de Hockey. He played for a total of five seasons with Wichita Thunder in Kansas, USA and is currently under contract with the Brantford Blast of Brantford, Ontario in the ACH league for the 2019–20 season.

== Playing career ==
Undrafted to the NHL, Lizon played for a year for Streetsville Derbys and moved on to play major junior hockey in the Quebec Major Junior Hockey League with the Victoriaville Tigres making it to the playoffs for two consecutive seasons in 2004-05 and 2005-06. Lizon then continued to play professionally for the Rockford IceHogs of UHL, Oklahoma City Blazers and Laredo Bucks of CHL, the Bakersfield Condors and Worcester Sharks of the ECHL and briefly for the Worcester Sharks of the American Hockey League.

In 2011, he moved to Wichita Thunder for two seasons, making it to the playoffs for both 2011-12 and 2012-13 seasons reaching the CHL Conference Semi Finals. In July 2013, Lizon left the Wichita Thunder and signed a one-year contract with the Oklahoma City Barons of the American Hockey League. After 12 games with the Barons in the 2013–14 season, Lizon was reassigned to the Wichita Thunder where he remained for three more consecutive seasons from 2013 to 2016.

After five seasons with the Wichita Thunder from 2011 to 2016, Lizon opted to leave as a free agent and sign one-year deal with Saint-Georges Cool FM 103.5 of the Ligue Nord-Américaine de Hockey (LNAH) for 2016-17 season.

== Career statistics ==
			Regular season					Playoffs
Season	Team	League	GP	G	A	Pts	PIM	GP	G	A	Pts	PIM
2004–05	Streetsville Derbys	OPJHL	19	2	6	8	62	—	—	—	—	—
2004–05	Victoriaville Tigres	QMJHL	38	3	8	11	103	7	1	1	2	15
2005–06	Victoriaville Tigres	QMJHL	65	11	12	23	127	5	0	0	0	9
2006–07	Rockford IceHogs	UHL	52	1	6	7	137	—	—	—	—	—
2007–08	Oklahoma City Blazers	CHL	23	2	3	5	67	—	—	—	—	—
2008–09	Laredo Bucks	CHL	60	7	9	16	115	—	—	—	—	—
2009–10	Bakersfield Condors	ECHL	59	3	3	7	204	—	—	—	—	—
2010–11	Bakersfield Condors	ECHL	48	3	4	7	208	—	—	—	—	—
2010–11	Worcester Sharks	AHL	8	0	0	0	24	—	—	—	—	—
2011–12	Wichita Thunder	CHL	65	3	3	6	159	15	1	1	2	19
2012–13	Wichita Thunder	CHL	30	2	3	5	75	15	1	0	1	21
2012–13	Oklahoma City Barons	AHL	17	0	0	0	30	—	—	—	—	—
2013–14	Oklahoma City Barons	AHL	12	0	0	0	25	—	—	—	—	—
2013–14	Wichita Thunder	CHL	47	5	6	11	122	—	—	—	—	—
2014–15	Wichita Thunder	ECHL	71	7	11	18	196	—	—	—	—	—
2015–16	Wichita Thunder	ECHL	55	2	2	4	86	—	—	—	—	—
2016–17	Saint-Georges Cool FM 103.5	LNAH	21	2	1	3	58	5	0	0	0	5
2017–18	Jonquière Marquis	LNAH	4	0	0	0	7	—	—	—	—	—
2018–19	Stoney Creek Generals	ACH	15	2	6	8	54	8	3	1	4	2
AHL totals			37	0	0	0	79	—	—	—	—	—

== Awards ==
- 2011 ECHL All-Star Game (Bakersfield)
- 2018–19 ACH Champion
