= Justin Sawyer =

Canadian ice hockey player

- Born: October 18, 1985 (age 39); Oshawa, Ontario, Canada
- Height: 6 ft 6 in (198 cm)
- Weight: 240 lb (109 kg; 17 st 2 lb)
- Position: Defence
- Shoots: Left
- ACH team Former teams: Stoney Creek Generals; Toronto Marlies; Cardiff Devils
- NHL draft: Undrafted
- Playing career: 2006–present

Justin Sawyer (born October 18, 1985) is a Canadian former professional ice hockey player who is currently playing senior men's hockey with the Stoney Creek Generals of the Allan Cup Hockey (ACH). He last played professionally for the Elmira Jackals of the ECHL. He is mostly known as an Enforcer. In his third season with the Rapid City Rush, Sawyer was traded to the Elmira Jackals on December 4, 2014.

== Career statistics ==
			Regular season					Playoffs
Season	Team	League	GP	G	A	Pts	PIM	GP	G	A	Pts	PIM
2001–02	Oshawa Legionaires	OPJHL	41	1	5	6	72	—	—	—	—	—
2002–03	Oshawa Legionaires	OPJHL	46	2	11	13	117	—	—	—	—	—
2003–04	Oshawa Legionaires	OPJHL	15	0	4	4	68	—	—	—	—	—
2003–04	Couchiching Terriers	OPJHL	28	1	6	7	146	—	—	—	—	—
2004–05	Oshawa Legionaires	OPJHL	21	1	5	6	66	—	—	—	—	—
2004–05	Oshawa Generals	OHL	14	0	0	0	21	—	—	—	—	—
2005–06	Oshawa Generals	OHL	67	1	12	13	212	—	—	—	—	—
2005–06	Toronto Marlies	AHL	13	0	0	0	24	—	—	—	—	—
2006–07	Columbia Inferno	ECHL	54	0	7	7	182	—	—	—	—	—
2006–07	Toronto Marlies	AHL	2	0	0	0	4	—	—	—	—	—
2007–08	Stockton Thunder	ECHL	1	0	0	0	7	—	—	—	—	—
2007–08	Oklahoma City Blazers	CHL	57	1	8	9	303	—	—	—	—	—
2008–09	Oklahoma City Blazers	CHL	64	0	13	13	205	5	0	1	1	6
2009–10	Bloomington PrairieThunder	IHL	76	4	9	13	288	—	—	—	—	—
2010–11	Cardiff Devils	EIHL	11	1	0	1	80	—	—	—	—	—
2010–11	Odessa Jackalopes	CHL	33	1	3	4	94	7	0	0	0	13
2011–12	Wichita Thunder	CHL	64	5	4	9	151	16	0	0	0	30
2012–13	Rapid City Rush	CHL	59	0	2	2	238	4	0	0	0	2
2013–14	Rapid City Rush	CHL	58	5	11	16	155	—	—	—	—	—
2014–15	Rapid City Rush	ECHL	2	0	0	0	12	—	—	—	—	—
2014–15	Elmira Jackals	ECHL	42	0	2	2	163	—	—	—	—	—
CHL totals			335	12	41	53	1146	32	0	1	1	49
