= Daniel Tetrault =

Canadian ice hockey player

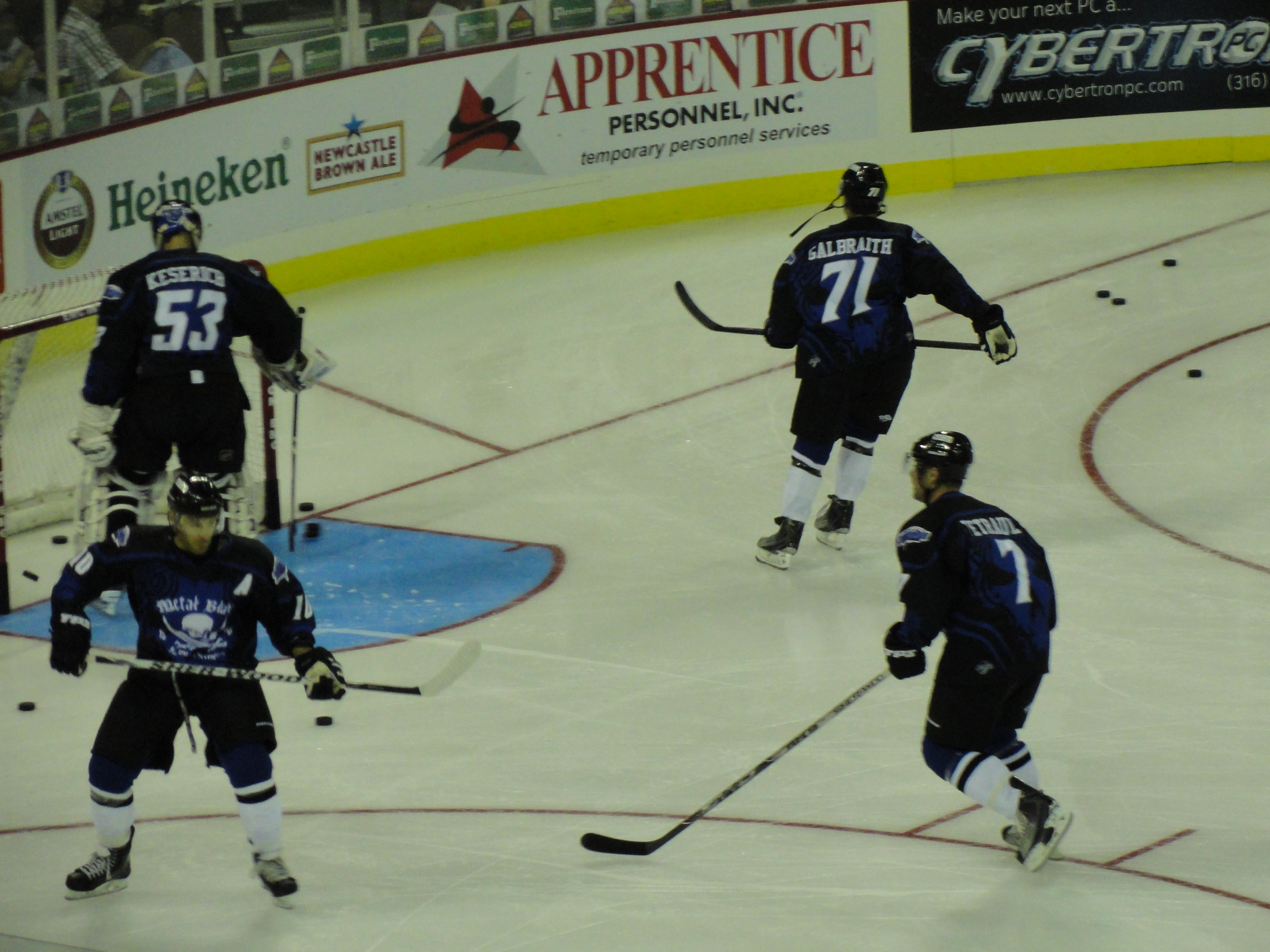
- #7 Daniel Tetrault in pregame warm ups with the Wichita Thunder.
- Born: September 4, 1979 (age 46) La Broquerie, Manitoba, Canada
- Height: 6 ft 0 in (183 cm)
- Weight: 205 lb (93 kg; 14 st 9 lb)
- Position: Defence
- Shot: Right
- team Former teams: Free Agent; Bridgeport Sound Tigers; Peoria Rivermen
- NHL draft: 91st overall, 1997; Montreal Canadiens
- Playing career: 2000–2015

Daniel Tetrault (born September 4, 1979) is a Canadian professional ice hockey defenceman, having last played for and was a team captain with the Rapid City Rush of the ECHL. Tetrault was originally drafted 91st overall by the Montreal Canadiens in the 1997 NHL entry draft. From 2017 to 2021, he was head coach of the Rapid City Rush, leading the team to a 116–134–25 record over four seasons and never making a playoff appearance.

Tetrault won the Central Hockey League Most Outstanding Defenseman in the 2001–02 CHL season. The long-time CHL defenseman signed with the Allen Americans for the 2013–14 season. After claiming his first Ray Miron Cup championship with the Americans, Tetrault signed with the Rapid City Rush on July 31, 2014.

== Career statistics ==
			Regular season					Playoffs
Season	Team	League	GP	G	A	Pts	PIM	GP	G	A	Pts	PIM
1995–96	Brandon Wheat Kings	WHL	72	6	13	19	91	19	1	1	2	25
1996–97	Brandon Wheat Kings	WHL	64	5	24	29	136	6	0	0	0	14
1997–98	Brandon Wheat Kings	WHL	16	2	3	5	32	18	0	5	5	25
1998–99	Brandon Wheat Kings	WHL	57	10	36	46	91	4	0	0	0	9
1999–00	Brandon Wheat Kings	WHL	31	4	10	14	43	—	—	—	—	—
2000–01	Austin Ice Bats	WPHL	64	15	23	38	76	4	0	1	1	2
2001–02	Bridgeport Sound Tigers	AHL	6	0	1	1	0	—	—	—	—	—
2001–02	Austin Ice Bats	CHL	58	11	32	43	108	15	3	4	7	18
2002–03	Trenton Titans	ECHL	39	6	12	8	38	1	0	0	0	0
2002–03	Bridgeport Sound Tigers	AHL	28	0	3	3	47	—	—	—	—	—
2003–04	Austin Ice Bats	CHL	41	9	14	23	40	—	—	—	—	—
2003–04	New Mexico Scorpions	CHL	14	2	2	4	9	—	—	—	—	—
2004–05	New Mexico Scorpions	CHL	60	6	20	26	38	—	—	—	—	—
2005–06	Wichita Thunder	CHL	64	15	42	57	129	5	0	5	5	15
2006–07	Wichita Thunder	CHL	54	11	28	39	69	6	1	0	1	15
2007–08	Wichita Thunder	CHL	64	7	25	32	101	—	—	—	—	—
2008–09	Port Huron Icehawks	IHL	70	8	29	37	62	6	1	3	4	13
2009–10	Port Huron Icehawks	IHL	65	9	36	45	60	7	1	2	3	6
2010–11	Wichita Thunder	CHL	59	8	19	27	68	5	3	1	4	0
2011–12	Wichita Thunder	CHL	39	7	14	21	43	16	3	6	9	12
2012–13	Evansville Icemen	ECHL	68	14	24	38	71	—	—	—	—	—
2012–13	Peoria Rivermen	AHL	7	0	0	0	2	—	—	—	—	—
2013–14	Allen Americans	CHL	66	9	16	25	84	17	3	6	9	10
2014–15	Rapid City Rush	ECHL	55	6	19	25	42	8	1	2	3	2
	CHL totals		519	85	212	297	689	64	13	22	35	70
