= 2014–15 LNAH season =

This was the 2014-15 Ligue Nord-Americaine de Hockey season.

== Franchise changes ==
- The Laval Braves are renamed the Laval Prédateurs when the previous ownership of the former Valleyfield Braves franchise acquires a Quebec Junior Hockey League and retains the rights to the Braves name
- The Trois-Rivieres Viking are renamed the Blizzard Cloutier Nord-Sud.

== Regular season ==
Team	GP	W	L	OTL	SOL	GF	GA	Pts
Sorel-Tracy Éperviers	40	30	8	2	-	198	134	62
Jonquiere Marquis	40	26	9	5	-	184	152	57
Thetford Mines Isothermic	40	20	15	5	-	155	161	45
Trois-Rivieres Blizzard Cloutier Nord-Sud	40	20	17	3	-	196	178	43
Saint-Georges Cool FM 103.5	40	19	17	4	-	149	165	42
Rivière-du-Loup 3L	40	18	17	5	-	195	206	41
Laval Prédateurs	40	16	22	2	-	178	206	34
Cornwall River Kings	40	11	26	3	-	123	176	25

== Playoffs ==
Quarterfinals
8	Cornwall	3
1	Sorel-Tracy	4
7	Laval	0
2	Jonquiere	4
6	Riviere-du-Loop	3
3	Thetford Mines	4
5	St-Georges	3
4	Trois Rivieres	4

Semifinals
1	Sorel-Tracy	4
4	Trois-Rivieres	3
3	Thetford Mines	4
2	Jonquiere	1

Final
1	Sorel-Tracy	1
3	Thetford Mines	4
