= 2013–14 LNAH season =

Canadian ice hockey league season

The 2013–14 LNAH season was the 18th season of the Ligue Nord-Américaine de Hockey (before 2004 the Quebec Semi-Pro Hockey League), a minor professional league in the Canadian province of Quebec. Eight teams participated in the regular season, which was won by the Trois-Rivières Viking. Jonquière Marquis won the playoff championship.

== Regular season ==
	GP	W	L	OTL	GF	GA	Pts
Trois-Rivières Viking	40	28	7	5	175	131	61
Jonquière Marquis	40	24	14	2	164	144	50
Sorel-Tracy Éperviers	40	22	12	6	162	136	50
Thetford Mines Isothermic	40	21	15	4	148	145	56
Riviere-du-Loup 3L	40	19	15	6	172	172	44
Saint-Georges Cool FM 103.5	40	20	18	2	142	153	42
Cornwall River Kings	40	16	20	4	142	151	36
Laval Braves	40	10	27	3	130	203	23

== Coupe Canam-Playoffs ==
Quarterfinals
1	Trois-Rivières Viking	4
8	Laval Braves	1
4	Thetford Mines Isothermic	4
5	Riviere-du-Loup 3L	0
3	Sorel-Tracy Éperviers	4
6	Saint-Georges Cool FM 103.5	1
2	Jonquière Marquis	4
7	Cornwall River Kings	2

Semifinals
1	Trois-Rivières Viking	3
4	Thetford Mines Isothermic	4
3	Sorel-Tracy Éperviers	1
2	Jonquière Marquis	4

Final
4	Thetford Mines Isothermic	2
2	Jonquière Marquis	4
