= Hartinger =

Hartinger is a surname. Notable people with the surname include:

- Anton Hartinger (1806–1890), Austrian painter
- Brent Hartinger, American writer
- Christian Hartinger, Austrian-born New Zealand chemist
- James V. Hartinger (1925–2000), United States Air Force general
- John M. Hartinger (born 1955), American politician
- Josef Hartinger (1893–1984), German lawyer
- Vladimir Hartinger (born 1979), Czech ice hockey player
