= 2014–15 NHL transactions =

The following is a list of all team-to-team transactions that have occurred in the National Hockey League during the 2014–15 NHL season. It lists which team each player has been traded to, signed by, or claimed by, and for which player(s) or draft pick (s), if applicable. Players who have retired are also listed. The 2014–15 trade deadline was on March 2, 2015. Any players traded or claimed off waivers after this date were eligible to play up until, but not in the 2015 Stanley Cup playoffs.

== Retirement ==
| Date | Player | Last Team | Ref |
|---|---|---|---|
| July, 2014 | Harry Young | New Jersey Devils | |
| July 24, 2014 | Rob Davison | San Jose Sharks | |
| August 20, 2014 | Mike Mottau | Florida Panthers | |
| August 21, 2014 | Jean-Sebastien Giguere | Colorado Avalanche | |
| September 10, 2014 | Saku Koivu | Anaheim Ducks | |
| October 27, 2014 | Mike Komisarek | Carolina Hurricanes | |
| November 29, 2014 | Marc-Andre Bourdon | Philadelphia Flyers | |
| December 4, 2014 | Daniel Alfredsson | Detroit Red Wings | |
| December 5, 2014 | George Parros | Montreal Canadiens | |
| December 14, 2014 | Tomas Vokoun | Pittsburgh Penguins | |
| January 21, 2015 | Ray Whitney | Dallas Stars | |
| January 27, 2015 | Radek Dvorak | Carolina Hurricanes | |
| January 29, 2015 | Martin Brodeur | St. Louis Blues | |
| February 11, 2015 | Evgeni Nabokov | San Jose Sharks | |
| March 26, 2015 | Mikael Samuelsson | Detroit Red Wings | |
| April 11, 2015 | Robyn Regehr | Los Angeles Kings | |
| June 15, 2015 | Kimmo Timonen | Chicago Blackhawks | |

== Contract terminations ==
At any time, a team and a player can mutually agree to terminate a player's contract.

For more details on contract terminations:

Teams may buy out player contracts (after the conclusion of a season) for a portion of the remaining value of the contract, paid over a period of twice the remaining length of the contract. This reduced number and extended period is applied to the cap hit as well.

- If the player was under the age of 26 at the time of the buyout the player's pay and cap hit will reduced by a factor of 2/3 over the extended period.
- If the player was 26 or older at the time of the buyout the player's pay and cap hit will reduced by a factor of 1/3 over the extended period.
- If the player was 35 or older at the time of signing the contract the player's pay will be reduced by a factor of 1/3, but the cap hit will not be reduced over the extended period.

All players must clear waivers before having a contract terminated. Injured players cannot be bought out.

^{†} - Following the 2012–13 NHL lockout each team was granted two compliance buyouts (to be exercised after the 2012–13 season and/or after the 2013–14 season) that would not count against the salary cap in any further year, regardless of the player's age. After using a compliance buyout on a player, that player is prohibited from rejoining the team that bought him out for one year; the NHL deemed that the re-signing of a player following a trade and a subsequent compliance buyout would be ruled as cap circumvention.

| Date | Name | Previous team | Notes | Ref |
|---|---|---|---|---|
| June 29, 2014 | Christian Ehrhoff | Buffalo Sabres | Compliance buyout^{†} | |
| June 30, 2014 | Ed Jovanovski | Florida Panthers | Compliance buyout^{†} | |
| June 30, 2014 | Shane O'Brien | Calgary Flames | Compliance buyout^{†} | |
| June 30, 2014 | Tim Gleason | Toronto Maple Leafs | Buyout | |
| June 30, 2014 | Anton Volchenkov | New Jersey Devils | Compliance buyout^{†} | |
| July 16, 2014 | Kirill Kabanov | New York Islanders | Mutual termination | |
| October 8, 2014 | Peter Mueller | St. Louis Blues | Mutual termination | |
| October 11, 2014 | Marcel Noebels | Philadelphia Flyers | Mutual termination | |
| October 11, 2014 | Matthew Lombardi | New York Rangers | Mutual termination | |
| October 16, 2014 | Steven Whitney | Anaheim Ducks | Mutual termination | |
| October 22, 2014 | Alexander Fallstrom | Boston Bruins | Mutual termination | |
| October 28, 2014 | Simon Hjalmarsson | Columbus Blue Jackets | Mutual termination | |
| November 21, 2014 | Petri Kontiola | Toronto Maple Leafs | Mutual termination | |
| December 12, 2014 | Damien Brunner | New Jersey Devils | Mutual termination | |
| January 5, 2015 | Jerome Samson | Tampa Bay Lightning | Mutual termination | |
| January 9, 2015 | Henrik Tommernes | Vancouver Canucks | Mutual termination | |
| January 22, 2015 | Jakub Culek | Ottawa Senators | Mutual termination | |
| January 29, 2015 | Simon Gagne | Boston Bruins | Mutual termination | |
| February 4, 2015 | Ryan Malone | New York Rangers | Mutual termination | |
| February 27, 2015 | Ilya Bryzgalov | Anaheim Ducks | Mutual termination | |
| April 5, 2015 | Artem Sergeev | Tampa Bay Lightning | Mutual termination | |
| June 12, 2015 | Jussi Rynnas | Dallas Stars | Mutual termination | |
| June 19, 2015 | Matt Cooke | Minnesota Wild | Buyout | |
| June 20, 2015 | Adam Burish | San Jose Sharks | Buyout | |

== Free agency ==
Note: This does not include players who have re-signed with their previous team as an unrestricted free agent or as a restricted free agent.

| Date | Player | New Team | Last Team | Ref |
|---|---|---|---|---|
| July 1, 2014 | Manny Malhotra | Montreal Canadiens | Carolina Hurricanes | |
| July 1, 2014 | Christian Ehrhoff | Pittsburgh Penguins | Buffalo Sabres | |
| July 1, 2014 | Mark Fayne | Edmonton Oilers | New Jersey Devils | |
| July 1, 2014 | Benoit Pouliot | Edmonton Oilers | New York Rangers | |
| July 1, 2014 | Jesse Winchester | Colorado Avalanche | Florida Panthers | |
| July 1, 2014 | Chad Johnson | New York Islanders | Boston Bruins | |
| July 1, 2014 | Justin Peters | Washington Capitals | Carolina Hurricanes | |
| July 1, 2014 | Paul Stastny | St. Louis Blues | Colorado Avalanche | |
| July 1, 2014 | Mike Cammalleri | New Jersey Devils | Calgary Flames | |
| July 1, 2014 | T.J. Brennan | New York Islanders | Toronto Maple Leafs | |
| July 1, 2014 | Clayton Stoner | Anaheim Ducks | Minnesota Wild | |
| July 1, 2014 | Tom Gilbert | Montreal Canadiens | Florida Panthers | |
| July 1, 2014 | Brad Malone | Carolina Hurricanes | Colorado Avalanche | |
| July 1, 2014 | Jussi Jokinen | Florida Panthers | Pittsburgh Penguins | |
| July 1, 2014 | Mason Raymond | Calgary Flames | Toronto Maple Leafs | |
| July 1, 2014 | Dan Boyle | New York Rangers | San Jose Sharks | |
| July 1, 2014 | Dave Bolland | Florida Panthers | Toronto Maple Leafs | |
| July 1, 2014 | Mike Kostka | New York Rangers | Tampa Bay Lightning | |
| July 1, 2014 | Brooks Orpik | Washington Capitals | Pittsburgh Penguins | |
| July 1, 2014 | Joe Vitale | Arizona Coyotes | Pittsburgh Penguins | |
| July 1, 2014 | Ryan Miller | Vancouver Canucks | St. Louis Blues | |
| July 1, 2014 | Ales Hemsky | Dallas Stars | Ottawa Senators | |
| July 1, 2014 | Anders Lindback | Dallas Stars | Tampa Bay Lightning | |
| July 1, 2014 | Al Montoya | Florida Panthers | Winnipeg Jets | |
| July 1, 2014 | Thomas Greiss | Pittsburgh Penguins | Arizona Coyotes | |
| July 1, 2014 | Blake Comeau | Pittsburgh Penguins | Columbus Blue Jackets | |
| July 1, 2014 | Shawn Thornton | Florida Panthers | Boston Bruins | |
| July 1, 2014 | Brian Gionta | Buffalo Sabres | Montreal Canadiens | |
| July 1, 2014 | Keith Aulie | Edmonton Oilers | Tampa Bay Lightning | |
| July 1, 2014 | Mathieu Perreault | Winnipeg Jets | Anaheim Ducks | |
| July 1, 2014 | Taylor Fedun | San Jose Sharks | Edmonton Oilers | |
| July 1, 2014 | Jonas Hiller | Calgary Flames | Anaheim Ducks | |
| July 1, 2014 | Thomas Vanek | Minnesota Wild | Montreal Canadiens | |
| July 1, 2014 | Stephane Robidas | Toronto Maple Leafs | Anaheim Ducks | |
| July 1, 2014 | Tanner Glass | New York Rangers | Pittsburgh Penguins | |
| July 1, 2014 | Brett Sutter | Minnesota Wild | Carolina Hurricanes | |
| July 1, 2014 | Bruno Gervais | Colorado Avalanche | Philadelphia Flyers | |
| July 1, 2014 | Derek MacKenzie | Florida Panthers | Columbus Blue Jackets | |
| July 1, 2014 | Matt Moulson | Buffalo Sabres | Minnesota Wild | |
| July 1, 2014 | Martin Havlat | New Jersey Devils | San Jose Sharks | |
| July 1, 2014 | Cody McCormick | Buffalo Sabres | Minnesota Wild | |
| July 1, 2014 | Jarome Iginla | Colorado Avalanche | Boston Bruins | |
| July 1, 2014 | Anton Stralman | Tampa Bay Lightning | New York Rangers | |
| July 1, 2014 | Zach Redmond | Colorado Avalanche | Winnipeg Jets | |
| July 1, 2014 | Chris Mueller | New York Rangers | Dallas Stars | |
| July 1, 2014 | Ben Street | Colorado Avalanche | Calgary Flames | |
| July 1, 2014 | Deryk Engelland | Calgary Flames | Pittsburgh Penguins | |
| July 1, 2014 | Cody Bass | Chicago Blackhawks | Columbus Blue Jackets | |
| July 1, 2014 | Pierre-Cedric Labrie | Chicago Blackhawks | Tampa Bay Lightning | |
| July 1, 2014 | Steven Kampfer | New York Rangers | Minnesota Wild | |
| July 1, 2014 | Kevin Porter | Detroit Red Wings | Buffalo Sabres | |
| July 1, 2014 | Mike Blunden | Tampa Bay Lightning | Montreal Canadiens | |
| July 1, 2014 | Scott Clemmensen | New Jersey Devils | Florida Panthers | |
| July 1, 2014 | Andrej Meszaros | Buffalo Sabres | Boston Bruins | |
| July 1, 2014 | Matt Hunwick | New York Rangers | Colorado Avalanche | |
| July 1, 2014 | Devan Dubnyk | Arizona Coyotes | Montreal Canadiens | |
| July 1, 2014 | Adam Cracknell | Los Angeles Kings | St. Louis Blues | |
| July 1, 2014 | David Van der Gulik | Los Angeles Kings | Colorado Avalanche | |
| July 1, 2014 | Brad Richards | Chicago Blackhawks | New York Rangers | |
| July 1, 2014 | Cedrick Desjardins | New York Rangers | Tampa Bay Lightning | |
| July 1, 2014 | Matt Niskanen | Washington Capitals | Pittsburgh Penguins | |
| July 1, 2014 | Willie Mitchell | Florida Panthers | Los Angeles Kings | |
| July 1, 2014 | Joey MacDonald | Montreal Canadiens | Calgary Flames | |
| July 1, 2014 | Andy Miele | Detroit Red Wings | Arizona Coyotes | |
| July 1, 2014 | Brian Boyle | Tampa Bay Lightning | New York Rangers | |
| July 1, 2014 | Jon Landry | Washington Capitals | Minnesota Wild | |
| July 1, 2014 | Mike Moore | Washington Capitals | Boston Bruins | |
| July 1, 2014 | Chris Breen | Boston Bruins | Calgary Flames | |
| July 1, 2014 | Evgeni Nabokov | Tampa Bay Lightning | New York Islanders | |
| July 1, 2014 | Taylor Chorney | Pittsburgh Penguins | St. Louis Blues | |
| July 1, 2014 | David Leggio | New York Islanders | Washington Capitals | |
| July 1, 2014 | Jack Skille | New York Islanders | Columbus Blue Jackets | |
| July 1, 2014 | Harry Zolnierczyk | New York Islanders | Pittsburgh Penguins | |
| July 1, 2014 | Drew MacIntyre | Carolina Hurricanes | Toronto Maple Leafs | |
| July 1, 2014 | Cory Conacher | New York Islanders | Buffalo Sabres | |
| July 1, 2014 | Stu Bickel | Minnesota Wild | New York Rangers | |
| July 1, 2014 | Jason LaBarbera | Anaheim Ducks | Chicago Blackhawks | |
| July 1, 2014 | Chris Conner | Washington Capitals | Pittsburgh Penguins | |
| July 1, 2014 | Blair Jones | Philadelphia Flyers | Calgary Flames | |
| July 1, 2014 | Alexandre Bolduc | Arizona Coyotes | St. Louis Blues | |
| July 1, 2014 | Andrew Campbell | Arizona Coyotes | Los Angeles Kings | |
| July 1, 2014 | Mike McKenna | Arizona Coyotes | Columbus Blue Jackets | |
| July 1, 2014 | Patrick Eaves | Dallas Stars | Nashville Predators | |
| July 2, 2014 | Steve Downie | Pittsburgh Penguins | Philadelphia Flyers | |
| July 2, 2014 | Dustin Jeffrey | Vancouver Canucks | Dallas Stars | |
| July 2, 2014 | Blake Parlett | Florida Panthers | Boston Bruins | |
| July 2, 2014 | Olli Jokinen | Nashville Predators | Winnipeg Jets | |
| July 2, 2014 | Carter Camper | Ottawa Senators | Columbus Blue Jackets | |
| July 2, 2014 | John Scott | San Jose Sharks | Buffalo Sabres | |
| July 2, 2014 | Jeremy Smith | Boston Bruins | Columbus Blue Jackets | |
| July 2, 2014 | Mikhail Grabovski | New York Islanders | Washington Capitals | |
| July 2, 2014 | Nikolay Kulemin | New York Islanders | Toronto Maple Leafs | |
| July 2, 2014 | Nick Schultz | Philadelphia Flyers | Columbus Blue Jackets | |
| July 2, 2014 | Andrew Gordon | Philadelphia Flyers | Winnipeg Jets | |
| July 2, 2014 | Jay McClement | Carolina Hurricanes | Toronto Maple Leafs | |
| July 2, 2014 | Zack Stortini | Philadelphia Flyers | Anaheim Ducks | |
| July 2, 2014 | Joel Rechlicz | Minnesota Wild | Washington Capitals | |
| July 3, 2014 | Radim Vrbata | Vancouver Canucks | Arizona Coyotes | |
| July 3, 2014 | Tim Gleason | Carolina Hurricanes | Toronto Maple Leafs | |
| July 3, 2014 | Sena Acolatse | Calgary Flames | San Jose Sharks | |
| July 3, 2014 | Aaron Johnson | Ottawa Senators | New York Rangers | |
| July 3, 2014 | Mike Santorelli | Toronto Maple Leafs | Vancouver Canucks | |
| July 3, 2014 | Nick Tarnasky | New York Rangers | Montreal Canadiens | |
| July 3, 2014 | Tyson Strachan | Buffalo Sabres | Washington Capitals | |
| July 4, 2014 | Ben Holmstrom | Carolina Hurricanes | Philadelphia Flyers | |
| July 4, 2014 | Tim Kennedy | Washington Capitals | Arizona Coyotes | |
| July 4, 2014 | Kris Newbury | Washington Capitals | Philadelphia Flyers | |
| July 4, 2014 | John McCarthy | St. Louis Blues | San Jose Sharks | |
| July 4, 2014 | Brian Gibbons | Columbus Blue Jackets | Pittsburgh Penguins | |
| July 4, 2014 | David Legwand | Ottawa Senators | Detroit Red Wings | |
| July 5, 2014 | Patrick McNeill | Arizona Coyotes | Columbus Blue Jackets | |
| July 7, 2014 | Anton Volchenkov | Nashville Predators | New Jersey Devils | |
| July 8, 2014 | Matt Corrente | Tampa Bay Lightning | Carolina Hurricanes | |
| July 9, 2014 | Dany Heatley | Anaheim Ducks | Minnesota Wild | |
| July 10, 2014 | Micheal Haley | San Jose Sharks | New York Rangers | |
| July 10, 2014 | Bryan Lerg | San Jose Sharks | Colorado Avalanche | |
| July 10, 2014 | Jerome Samson | Tampa Bay Lightning | Winnipeg Jets | |
| July 11, 2014 | Brenden Morrow | Tampa Bay Lightning | St. Louis Blues | |
| July 11, 2014 | Jordan Schroeder | Minnesota Wild | Vancouver Canucks | |
| July 13, 2014 | Zac Dalpe | Buffalo Sabres | Vancouver Canucks | |
| July 15, 2014 | Mike Ribeiro | Nashville Predators | Arizona Coyotes | |
| July 15, 2014 | Derek Roy | Nashville Predators | St. Louis Blues | |
| July 16, 2014 | Benn Ferriero | St. Louis Blues | Vancouver Canucks | |
| July 16, 2014 | Chris Butler | St. Louis Blues | Calgary Flames | |
| July 19, 2014 | Lee Stempniak | New York Rangers | Pittsburgh Penguins | |
| July 21, 2014 | Nate Prosser | St. Louis Blues | Minnesota Wild | |
| July 21, 2014 | Jeremy Welsh | St. Louis Blues | Vancouver Canucks | |
| July 22, 2014 | David Booth | Toronto Maple Leafs | Vancouver Canucks | |
| July 23, 2014 | Andre Benoit | Buffalo Sabres | Colorado Avalanche | |
| July 28, 2014 | Daniel Winnik | Toronto Maple Leafs | Anaheim Ducks | |
| August 1, 2014 | Justin Falk | Minnesota Wild | New York Rangers | |
| August 1, 2014 | TJ Galiardi | Winnipeg Jets | Calgary Flames | |
| August 5, 2014 | Michael Del Zotto | Philadelphia Flyers | Nashville Predators | |
| August 7, 2014 | Ryan White | Philadelphia Flyers | Montreal Canadiens | |
| August 8, 2014 | Julien Brouillette | Winnipeg Jets | Washington Capitals | |
| August 23, 2014 | Devin Setoguchi | Calgary Flames | Winnipeg Jets | |
| September 5, 2014 | Colin Fraser | St. Louis Blues | Los Angeles Kings | |
| September 5, 2014 | Corey Potter | Calgary Flames | Boston Bruins | |
| September 11, 2014 | Ryan Malone | New York Rangers | Tampa Bay Lightning | |
| October 2, 2014 | Drayson Bowman | Montreal Canadiens | Carolina Hurricanes | |
| October 4, 2014 | Daniel Carcillo | Chicago Blackhawks | New York Rangers | |
| October 6, 2014 | Shane O'Brien | Florida Panthers | Calgary Flames | |
| October 6, 2014 | Ryan Carter | Minnesota Wild | New Jersey Devils | |
| October 6, 2014 | Raphael Diaz | Calgary Flames | New York Rangers | |
| October 7, 2014 | Jordin Tootoo | New Jersey Devils | Detroit Red Wings | |
| October 30, 2014 | Carlo Colaiacovo | Philadelphia Flyers | St. Louis Blues | |
| November 11, 2014 | Jamie McBain | Los Angeles Kings | Buffalo Sabres | |
| December 1, 2014 | Scott Gomez | New Jersey Devils | Florida Panthers | |
| December 2, 2014 | Martin Brodeur | St. Louis Blues | New Jersey Devils | |
| December 9, 2014 | Ilya Bryzgalov | Anaheim Ducks | Minnesota Wild | |
| December 18, 2014 | Mark Fraser | New Jersey Devils | Edmonton Oilers | |
| January 27, 2015 | Brad Mills | Ottawa Senators | Chicago Blackhawks | |

=== Imports ===
This section is for players who were not previously on contract with NHL teams in the past season. Listed is their previous team and the league that they belonged to.

| Date | Player | New team | Previous team | League | Ref |
|---|---|---|---|---|---|
| July 1, 2014 | Justin Hodgman | Arizona Coyotes | Admiral Vladivostok | KHL | |
| July 1, 2014 | Dylan Reese | Arizona Coyotes | Amur Khabarovsk | KHL | |
| July 1, 2014 | Scott Darling | Chicago Blackhawks | Milwaukee Admirals | AHL | |
| July 1, 2014 | Guillaume Gelinas | Minnesota Wild | Val-d'Or Foreurs | QMJHL | |
| July 1, 2014 | Jiri Sekac | Montreal Canadiens | HC Lev Praha | KHL | |
| July 1, 2014 | Kael Mouillierat | New York Islanders | St. John's IceCaps | AHL | |
| July 1, 2014 | Rob Zepp | Philadelphia Flyers | Eisbaren Berlin | DEL | |
| July 1, 2014 | Brent Regner | St. Louis Blues | Chicago Wolves | AHL | |
| July 2, 2014 | Kyle Cumiskey | Chicago Blackhawks | Modo Hockey | SHL | |
| July 2, 2014 | Brendan Ranford | Dallas Stars | Texas Stars | AHL | |
| July 2, 2014 | Chris Bourque | New York Rangers | EHC Biel | NLA | |
| July 2, 2014 | Cal O'Reilly | Vancouver Canucks | Utica Comets | AHL | |
| July 2, 2014 | Bobby Sanguinetti | Vancouver Canucks | Atlant Moscow Oblast | KHL | |
| July 3, 2014 | Brad Thiessen | Calgary Flames | Norfolk Admirals | AHL | |
| July 3, 2014 | Corbin McPherson | New Jersey Devils | Albany Devils | AHL | |
| July 3, 2014 | Petri Kontiola | Toronto Maple Leafs | Traktor Chelyabinsk | KHL | |
| July 4, 2014 | Brett Olson | Florida Panthers | Abbotsford Heat | AHL | |
| July 4, 2014 | Greg Zanon | Florida Panthers | San Antonio Rampage | AHL | |
| July 7, 2014 | Maxim Noreau | Colorado Avalanche | HC Ambri-Piotta | NLA | |
| July 7, 2014 | Jussi Rynnas | Dallas Stars | Oulun Karpat | Liiga | |
| July 11, 2014 | Tom McCollum | Detroit Red Wings | Grand Rapids Griffins | AHL | |
| July 15, 2014 | Matthew Lombardi | New York Rangers | Geneve-Servette HC | NLA | |
| July 29, 2014 | Peter Mueller | St. Louis Blues | Kloten Flyers | NLA | |
| August 18, 2014 | Michael Leighton | Chicago Blackhawks | HC Donbass | KHL | |
| August 20, 2014 | Kevin Hayes | New York Rangers | Boston College Eagles | NCAA | |
| August 30, 2014 | Dan Kelly | New Jersey Devils | Albany Devils | AHL | |
| September 20, 2014 | Cody Donaghey | Toronto Maple Leafs | Quebec Remparts | QMJHL | |
| September 23, 2014 | Alex Gudbranson | Minnesota Wild | Sault Ste. Marie Greyhounds | OHL | |
| September 23, 2014 | Hunter Warner | Minnesota Wild | Fargo Force | USHL | |
| September 24, 2014 | Joe Hicketts | Detroit Red Wings | Victoria Royals | WHL | |
| September 28, 2014 | Dmitrii Sergeev | St. Louis Blues | Kitchener Rangers | OHL | |
| October 6, 2014 | Liam O'Brien | Washington Capitals | Rouyn-Noranda Huskies | QMJHL | |
| November 29, 2014 | Jean Dupuy | Buffalo Sabres | Sault Ste. Marie Greyhounds | OHL | |
| January 15, 2015 | Joseph Blandisi | New Jersey Devils | Barrie Colts | OHL | |
| January 26, 2015 | Nikita Jevpalovs | San Jose Sharks | Blainville-Boisbriand Armada | QMJHL | |
| February 23, 2015 | Allen York | Tampa Bay Lightning | Syracuse Crunch | AHL | |
| March 4, 2015 | Aaron Dell | San Jose Sharks | Worcester Sharks | AHL | |
| March 5, 2015 | Justin Hickman | Boston Bruins | Seattle Thunderbirds | WHL | |
| March 10, 2015 | Danick Martel | Philadelphia Flyers | Blainville-Boisbriand Armada | QMJHL | |
| March 12, 2015 | Frank Vatrano | Boston Bruins | UMass Minutemen | NCAA | |
| March 12, 2015 | Cole Bardreau | Philadelphia Flyers | Cornell Big Red | NCAA | |
| March 14, 2015 | Ashton Sautner | Vancouver Canucks | Edmonton Oil Kings | WHL | |
| March 19, 2015 | Kenney Morrison | Calgary Flames | Western Michigan Broncos | NCAA | |
| March 20, 2015 | Colin Stevens | Florida Panthers | Union Dutchmen | NCAA | |
| March 20, 2015 | Nikita Soshnikov | Toronto Maple Leafs | Atlant Moscow Oblast | KHL | |
| March 21, 2015 | Casey Bailey | Toronto Maple Leafs | Penn State Nittany Lions | NCAA | |
| March 22, 2015 | Rasmus Tirronen | Carolina Hurricanes | Merrimack Warriors | NCAA | |
| March 24, 2015 | Grayson Downing | Minnesota Wild | New Hampshire Wildcats | NCAA | |
| March 26, 2015 | Kyle Baun | Chicago Blackhawks | Colgate Raiders | NCAA | |
| March 26, 2015 | Joel Rumpel | San Jose Sharks | Wisconsin Badgers | NCAA | |
| March 30, 2015 | Brody Hoffman | Minnesota Wild | Vermont Catamounts | NCAA | |
| March 30, 2015 | Zach Palmquist | Minnesota Wild | Minnesota State Mavericks | NCAA | |
| March 31, 2015 | Austin Czarnik | Boston Bruins | Miami RedHawks | NCAA | |
| March 31, 2015 | Ross Johnston | New York Islanders | Charlottetown Islanders | QMJHL | |
| April 2, 2015 | Tanner Kero | Chicago Blackhawks | Michigan Tech Huskies | NCAA | |
| April 4, 2015 | Colby Cave | Boston Bruins | Swift Current Broncos | WHL | |
| April 9, 2015 | Steve Moses | Nashville Predators | Jokerit | KHL | |
| April 13, 2015 | Garnet Hathaway | Calgary Flames | Adirondack Flames | AHL | |
| April 20, 2015 | Markus Hannikainen | Columbus Blue Jackets | JYP | Liiga | |
| April 22, 2015 | Evan Rodrigues | Buffalo Sabres | Boston University Terriers | NCAA | |
| April 24, 2015 | Kristian Nakyva | Nashville Predators | Lulea HF | SHL | |
| April 30, 2015 | Erik Gustafsson | Chicago Blackhawks | Frolunda HC | SHL | |
| April 30, 2015 | Artemi Panarin | Chicago Blackhawks | SKA Saint Petersburg | KHL | |
| May 1, 2015 | Christian Marti | Philadelphia Flyers | Geneve-Servette HC | NLA | |
| May 9, 2015 | Matt O'Connor | Ottawa Senators | Boston University Terriers | NCAA | |
| May 12, 2015 | Eetu Laurikainen | Edmonton Oilers | Espoo Blues | Liiga | |
| May 15, 2015 | Andreas Martinsen | Colorado Avalanche | Dusseldorfer EG | DEL | |
| May 19, 2015 | Jakub Nakladal | Calgary Flames | HC TPS | Liiga | |
| May 19, 2015 | Joonas Donskoi | San Jose Sharks | Oulun Karpat | Liiga | |
| May 20, 2015 | Evgeny Medvedev | Philadelphia Flyers | Ak Bars Kazan | KHL | |
| May 21, 2015 | Joonas Kemppainen | Boston Bruins | Oulun Karpat | Liiga | |
| May 21, 2015 | Aaron Palushaj | Philadelphia Flyers | Avtomobilist Yekaterinburg | KHL | |
| May 28, 2015 | Matthias Plachta | Arizona Coyotes | Adler Mannheim | DEL | |
| May 29, 2015 | Sergey Kalinin | New Jersey Devils | Avangard Omsk | KHL | |
| June 1, 2015 | Dean Kukan | Columbus Blue Jackets | Lulea HF | SHL | |
| June 1, 2015 | Chase Balisy | Florida Panthers | St. John's IceCaps | AHL | |
| June 2, 2015 | Noel Acciari | Boston Bruins | Providence Friars | NCAA | |
| June 15, 2015 | Derek Ryan | Carolina Hurricanes | Orebro HK | SHL | |
| June 15, 2015 | Vojtech Mozik | New Jersey Devils | HC Plzen | ELH | |
| June 15, 2015 | Niclas Andersen | Pittsburgh Penguins | Brynas IF | SHL | |

== Trades ==
* Retained Salary Transaction: Each team is allowed up to three contracts on their payroll where they have retained salary in a trade (i.e. the player no longer plays with Team A due to a trade to Team B, but Team A still retains some salary). Only up to 50% of a player's contract can be kept, and only up to 15% of a team's salary cap can be taken up by retained salary. A contract can only be involved in one of these trades twice.

=== June ===
| June 27, 2014 | To Nashville Predators James Neal | To Pittsburgh Penguins Patric Hornqvist; Nick Spaling |
| June 28, 2014 | To Vancouver Canucks Linden Vey | To Los Angeles Kings TBL's 2nd-round pick in 2014 |
| June 28, 2014 | To St. Louis Blues Carl Gunnarsson*; CGY's 4th-round pick in 2014 | To Toronto Maple Leafs Roman Polak |
| June 28, 2014 | To Calgary Flames Brandon Bollig | To Chicago Blackhawks PIT's 3rd-round pick in 2014 |
| June 28, 2014 | To Washington Capitals Eddie Pasquale; 6th-round pick in 2014 | To Winnipeg Jets 6th-round pick in 2014; NSH's 7th-round pick in 2014; 7th-round pick in 2015 |
| June 29, 2014 | To Tampa Bay Lightning Sam Gagner | To Edmonton Oilers Teddy Purcell |
| June 29, 2014 | To Arizona Coyotes Sam Gagner*; B.J. Crombeen | To Tampa Bay Lightning 6th-round pick in 2015 |
| June 30, 2014 | To Anaheim Ducks Nate Thompson | To Tampa Bay Lightning 4th-round pick in 2015; 7th-round pick in 2015 |
| June 30, 2014 | To Colorado Avalanche Daniel Briere | To Montreal Canadiens P.A. Parenteau; 5th-round pick in 2015 |

Pick-only 2014 NHL entry draft trades
| June 27, 2014 | To Chicago Blackhawks 1st-round pick in 2014 (#20 overall); NYR's 6th-round pick in 2014 (#179 overall) | To San Jose Sharks 1st-round pick in 2014 (#27 overall); FLA's 3rd-round pick in 2014 (#62 overall) |
| June 27, 2014 | To New York Islanders NYR's 1st-round pick in 2014 (#28 overall) | To Tampa Bay Lightning 2nd-round pick in 2014 (#35 overall); MTL's 2nd-round pick in 2014 (#57 overall) |
| June 28, 2014 | To Washington Capitals Winnipeg Jets' 2nd-round pick in 2014 (#39 overall) | To Buffalo Sabres 2nd-round pick in 2014 (#44 overall); 3rd-round pick in 2014 (#74 overall) |
| June 28, 2014 | To San Jose Sharks DET's 2nd-round pick in 2014 (#46 overall) | To Nashville Predators 2nd-round pick in 2014 (#51 overall); 4th-round pick in 2015 |
| June 28, 2014 | To Nashville Predators FLA's 3rd-round pick in 2014 (#62 overall) | To San Jose Sharks 3rd-round pick in 2014 (#72 overall); 4th-round pick in 2014 (#102 overall) |
| June 28, 2014 | To Detroit Red Wings EDM's 3rd-round pick in 2014 (#63 overall) | To Columbus Blue Jackets 3rd-round pick in 2014 (#76 overall); 3rd-round pick in 2015 |
| June 28, 2014 | To Florida Panthers 3rd-round pick in 2014 (#65 overall) | To New York Islanders 3rd-round pick in 2015 |
| June 28, 2014 | To Montreal Canadiens 3rd-round pick in 2014 (#73 overall) | To Arizona Coyotes 3rd-round pick in 2014 (#87 overall); 4th-round pick in 2014 (#117 overall) |
| June 28, 2014 | To Tampa Bay Lightning 3rd-round pick in 2014 (#79 overall) | To Minnesota Wild 3rd-round pick in 2014 (#80 overall); 7th-round pick in 2015 |
| June 28, 2014 | To Washington Capitals 3rd-round pick in 2014 (#89 overall) | To New York Rangers 4th-round pick in 2014 (#104 overall); CHI's 4th-round pick in 2014 (#118 overall) |
| June 28, 2014 | To Tampa Bay Lightning 4th-round pick in 2014 (#119 overall) | To New York Rangers 5th-round pick in 2014 (#140 overall); STL's 5th-round pick in 2014 (#142 overall) |
| June 28, 2014 | To Tampa Bay Lightning 7th-round pick in 2014 (#185 overall) | To New York Islanders 7th-round pick in 2014 (#200 overall); 7th-round pick in 2015 |
| June 28, 2014 | To Ottawa Senators 7th-round pick in 2014 (#189 overall) | To Winnipeg Jets 6th-round pick in 2015 |

=== July ===
| July 1, 2014 | To Dallas Stars Jason Spezza; Ludwig Karlsson | To Ottawa Senators Alex Chiasson; Alex Guptill; Nick Paul; 2nd-round pick in 2015 |
| July 1, 2014 | To Buffalo Sabres Josh Gorges | To Montreal Canadiens MIN's 2nd-round pick in 2016 |
| July 1, 2014 | To Colorado Avalanche Brad Stuart | To San Jose Sharks 2nd-round pick in 2016; 6th-round pick in 2015 |
| July 1, 2014 | To Toronto Maple Leafs Matt Frattin | To Columbus Blue Jackets Jerry D'Amigo conditional 7th-round pick in 2015 |
| July 2, 2014 | To San Jose Sharks Tye McGinn | To Philadelphia Flyers 3rd-round pick in 2015 |
| July 9, 2014 | To Buffalo Sabres Jordan Samuels-Thomas | To Winnipeg Jets conditional 7th-round pick in 2015 |

=== October ===
| October 4, 2014 | To New York Islanders Johnny Boychuk | To Boston Bruins PHI's 2nd-round pick in 2015 conditional 3rd-round pick in 2015; 2nd-round pick in 2016 |
| October 4, 2014 | To New York Islanders Nick Leddy; Kent Simpson | To Chicago Blackhawks Ville Pokka; T.J. Brennan; Anders Nilsson |
| October 5, 2014 | To Montreal Canadiens Eric Tangradi | To Winnipeg Jets Peter Budaj; Patrick Holland |
| October 6, 2014 | To New York Rangers Joey Crabb | To Florida Panthers Steven Kampfer; Andrew Yogan |

=== November ===
| November 11, 2014 | To Montreal Canadiens Sergei Gonchar* | To Dallas Stars Travis Moen |
| November 15, 2014 | To Columbus Blue Jackets Jordan Leopold* | To St. Louis Blues 5th-round pick in 2016 |
| November 20, 2014 | To Edmonton Oilers Kellan Lain | To Vancouver Canucks Will Acton |
| November 20, 2014 | To Montreal Canadiens Bryan Allen | To Anaheim Ducks Rene Bourque |
| November 21, 2014 | To Dallas Stars Jason Demers*; 3rd-round pick in 2016 | To San Jose Sharks Brenden Dillon |
| November 25, 2014 | To Vancouver Canucks Andrey Pedan | To New York Islanders Alexandre Mallet; 3rd-round pick in 2016 |
| November 28, 2014 | To Anaheim Ducks Eric Brewer* | To Tampa Bay Lightning EDM's 3rd-round pick in 2015 |

=== December ===
| December 4, 2014 | To Anaheim Ducks Colby Robak | To Florida Panthers Jesse Blacker conditional 4th-round pick in 2016 or 6th-round pick in 2017 |
| December 5, 2014 | To Pittsburgh Penguins Rob Klinkhammer conditional 5th-round pick in 2016 | To Arizona Coyotes Philip Samuelsson |
| December 14, 2014 | To Chicago Blackhawks Tim Erixon | To Columbus Blue Jackets Jeremy Morin |
| December 16, 2014 | To Columbus Blue Jackets Luke Adam | To Buffalo Sabres Jerry D'Amigo |
| December 18, 2014 | To Winnipeg Jets Jay Harrison* | To Carolina Hurricanes OTT's 6th-round pick in 2015 |
| December 29, 2014 | To Edmonton Oilers Derek Roy | To Nashville Predators Mark Arcobello |

=== January ===
| January 2, 2015 | To Pittsburgh Penguins David Perron | To Edmonton Oilers Rob Klinkhammer; 1st-round pick in 2015 |
| January 9, 2015 | To Calgary Flames Drew Shore | To Florida Panthers Corban Knight |
| January 14, 2015 | To Minnesota Wild Devan Dubnyk | To Arizona Coyotes 3rd-round pick in 2015 |
| January 27, 2015 | To Pittsburgh Penguins Maxim Lapierre | To St. Louis Blues Marcel Goc |
| January 29, 2015 | To Vancouver Canucks Adam Clendening | To Chicago Blackhawks Gustav Forsling |

=== February ===
| February 6, 2015 | To Tampa Bay Lightning Carter Ashton; David Broll | To Toronto Maple Leafs conditional 7th-round pick in 2016 |
| February 9, 2015 | To San Jose Sharks Evgeni Nabokov | To Tampa Bay Lightning future considerations |
| February 11, 2015 | To Buffalo Sabres Evander Kane; Zach Bogosian; Jason Kasdorf | To Winnipeg Jets Tyler Myers; Drew Stafford*; Joel Armia; Brendan Lemieux conditional 1st-round pick in 2015 |
| February 11, 2015 | To Dallas Stars Jhonas Enroth | To Buffalo Sabres Anders Lindback conditional 3rd-round pick in 2016 |
| February 15, 2015 | To Nashville Predators Cody Franson; Mike Santorelli | To Toronto Maple Leafs Olli Jokinen; Brendan Leipsic; 1st-round pick in 2015 |
| February 24, 2015 | To Anaheim Ducks Jiri Sekac | To Montreal Canadiens Devante Smith-Pelly |
| February 24, 2015 | To Minnesota Wild Sean Bergenheim; 7th-round pick in 2016 | To Florida Panthers 3rd-round pick in 2016 |
| February 25, 2015 | To Pittsburgh Penguins Daniel Winnik* | To Toronto Maple Leafs Zach Sill; 2nd-round pick in 2016; 4th-round pick in 2015 |
| February 25, 2015 | To Winnipeg Jets Jiri Tlusty | To Carolina Hurricanes 3rd-round pick in 2016 conditional 6th-round pick in 2015 |
| February 25, 2015 | To Los Angeles Kings Andrej Sekera | To Carolina Hurricanes Roland McKeown conditional 1st-round pick in 2015 or 2016 |
| February 26, 2015 | To St. Louis Blues Adam Cracknell | To Columbus Blue Jackets future considerations |
| February 26, 2015 | To Toronto Maple Leafs T.J. Brennan | To Chicago Blackhawks Spencer Abbott |
| February 26, 2015 | To Florida Panthers Jaromir Jagr | To New Jersey Devils 2nd-round pick in 2015 conditional 3rd-round pick in 2016 |
| February 26, 2015 | To Toronto Maple Leafs Nathan Horton | To Columbus Blue Jackets David Clarkson |
| February 27, 2015 | To Chicago Blackhawks Kimmo Timonen | To Philadelphia Flyers 2nd-round pick in 2015 conditional 4th-round pick in 2016 |
| February 28, 2015 | To Washington Capitals Tim Gleason | To Carolina Hurricanes Jack Hillen; ARI's 4th-round pick in 2015 |
| February 28, 2015 | To Anaheim Ducks Tomas Fleischmann | To Florida Panthers Dany Heatley; 3rd-round pick in 2015 |
| February 28, 2015 | To Chicago Blackhawks Antoine Vermette | To Arizona Coyotes Klas Dahlbeck; 1st-round pick in 2015 |

=== March ===
| March 1, 2015 | To Washington Capitals Curtis Glencross | To Calgary Flames 2nd-round pick in 2015; 3rd-round pick in 2015 |
| March 1, 2015 | To New York Rangers Keith Yandle*; Chris Summers; 4th-round pick in 2016 | To Arizona Coyotes John Moore; Anthony Duclair conditional 1st-round pick in 2016; 2nd-round pick in 2015 |
| March 1, 2015 | To Winnipeg Jets Lee Stempniak | To New York Rangers Carl Klingberg |
| March 1, 2015 | To New York Rangers James Sheppard* | To San Jose Sharks 4th-round pick in 2016 |
| March 1, 2015 | To Detroit Red Wings Erik Cole conditional 3rd-round pick in 2015 | To Dallas Stars Mattias Janmark; Mattias Backman; 2nd-round pick in 2015 |
| March 2, 2015 | To Boston Bruins Brett Connolly | To Tampa Bay Lightning 2nd-round pick in 2015; 2nd-round pick in 2016 |
| March 2, 2015 | To Tampa Bay Lightning Braydon Coburn | To Philadelphia Flyers Radko Gudas conditional 1st-round pick in 2015; 3rd-round pick in 2015 |
| March 2, 2015 | To Montreal Canadiens Jeff Petry | To Edmonton Oilers 2nd-round pick in 2015 conditional COL's 5th-round pick in 2015 |
| March 2, 2015 | To Montreal Canadiens Brian Flynn | To Buffalo Sabres 5th-round pick in 2016 |
| March 2, 2015 | To St. Louis Blues Zbynek Michalek* conditional 3rd-round pick in 2015 | To Arizona Coyotes Maxim Letunov |
| March 2, 2015 | To Chicago Blackhawks Andrew Desjardins* | To San Jose Sharks Ben Smith conditional 7th-round pick in 2017 |
| March 2, 2015 | To Detroit Red Wings Marek Zidlicky* | To New Jersey Devils conditional 5th-round pick in 2015 conditional 2nd-round pick in 2016 or 3rd-round pick in 2016 |
| March 2, 2015 | To New York Islanders Tyler Kennedy | To San Jose Sharks conditional 7th-round pick in 2015 or 3rd-round pick in 2016 |
| March 2, 2015 | To Colorado Avalanche Freddie Hamilton | To San Jose Sharks Karl Stollery |
| March 2, 2015 | To Pittsburgh Penguins Ian Cole* | To St. Louis Blues Robert Bortuzzo; 7th-round pick in 2016 |
| March 2, 2015 | To New York Islanders Michal Neuvirth | To Buffalo Sabres Chad Johnson conditional 3rd-round pick in 2016 |
| March 2, 2015 | To Vancouver Canucks Cory Conacher | To New York Islanders Dustin Jeffrey |
| March 2, 2015 | To Minnesota Wild Jordan Leopold | To Columbus Blue Jackets Justin Falk; 5th-round pick in 2015 |
| March 2, 2015 | To Arizona Coyotes David Leggio | To New York Islanders Mark Louis |
| March 2, 2015 | To St. Louis Blues Olli Jokinen | To Toronto Maple Leafs Joakim Lindstrom conditional 6th-round pick in 2016 |
| March 2, 2015 | To Minnesota Wild Chris Stewart* | To Buffalo Sabres 2nd-round pick in 2017 |
| March 2, 2015 | To Anaheim Ducks Simon Despres | To Pittsburgh Penguins Ben Lovejoy |
| March 2, 2015 | To Vancouver Canucks Sven Baertschi | To Calgary Flames 2nd-round pick in 2015 |
| March 2, 2015 | To Anaheim Ducks James Wisniewski; DET's 3rd-round pick in 2015 | To Columbus Blue Jackets Rene Bourque; William Karlsson; 2nd-round pick in 2015 |
| March 2, 2015 | To Boston Bruins Maxime Talbot*; Paul Carey | To Colorado Avalanche Jordan Caron; 6th-round pick in 2016 |
| March 2, 2015 | To Montreal Canadiens Torrey Mitchell | To Buffalo Sabres Jack Nevins; 7th-round pick in 2016 |
| March 2, 2015 | To Toronto Maple Leafs Eric Brewer; 5th-round pick in 2016 | To Anaheim Ducks Korbinian Holzer |
| March 2, 2015 | To Colorado Avalanche Mat Clark | To Anaheim Ducks Michael Sgarbossa |
| March 2, 2015 | To Boston Bruins Zack Phillips | To Minnesota Wild Jared Knight |

=== June (2015) ===
| June 1, 2015 | To Tampa Bay Lightning Daniel Walcott | To New York Rangers NYR's 7th-round pick in 2015 |
| June 19, 2015 | To Florida Panthers Greg McKegg | To Toronto Maple Leafs Zach Hyman conditional 7th-round pick in 2017 |
| June 25, 2015 | To Colorado Avalanche Carl Soderberg | To Boston Bruins BOS' 6th-round pick in 2016 |

== Waivers ==
Once an NHL player has played in a certain number of games or a set number of seasons has passed since the signing of his first NHL contract (see here), that player must be offered to all of the other NHL teams before he can be assigned to a minor league affiliate.

| Date | Player | New team | Previous team | Ref |
|---|---|---|---|---|
| October 2, 2014 | Nate Prosser | Minnesota Wild | St. Louis Blues | |
| October 5, 2014 | Jack Skille | Columbus Blue Jackets | New York Islanders | |
| October 7, 2014 | Adam Cracknell | Columbus Blue Jackets | Los Angeles Kings | |
| October 9, 2014 | Richard Panik | Toronto Maple Leafs | Tampa Bay Lightning | |
| November 18, 2014 | Kevin Connauton | Columbus Blue Jackets | Dallas Stars | |
| November 20, 2014 | Andrej Nestrasil | Carolina Hurricanes | Detroit Red Wings | |
| December 29, 2014 | Matt Fraser | Edmonton Oilers | Boston Bruins | |
| January 3, 2015 | David Schlemko | Dallas Stars | Arizona Coyotes | |
| January 14, 2015 | Mark Arcobello | Pittsburgh Penguins | Nashville Predators | |
| February 11, 2015 | Mark Arcobello | Arizona Coyotes | Pittsburgh Penguins | |
| February 12, 2015 | Brandon McMillan | Vancouver Canucks | Arizona Coyotes | |
| March 1, 2015 | Tim Erixon | Toronto Maple Leafs | Chicago Blackhawks | |
| March 1, 2015 | David Schlemko | Calgary Flames | Dallas Stars | |
| March 2, 2015 | Craig Cunningham | Arizona Coyotes | Boston Bruins | |
| March 2, 2015 | Tye McGinn | Arizona Coyotes | San Jose Sharks | |

== Staff compensation ==
NHL teams will receive compensation for losing a coach, general manager or president of hockey operations to another team while they are still under contract. Teams will receive a second-round draft pick if a transaction happens during the season and a third-round pick if one occurs in the off-season (a coach's season ends when his team is eliminated from the playoffs, while seasons for GMs and presidents of hockey operations finish after the conclusion of the NHL Draft in June). Teams will have a three-year window to choose from when to lose their draft pick.

| Date | Employee | Position | New team | Previous team | Compensation | Ref |
|---|---|---|---|---|---|---|
| April 24, 2015 | Peter Chiarelli | General Manager | Edmonton Oilers | Boston Bruins | 2nd-round pick in 2017 | |
| May 19, 2015 | Todd McLellan | Head coach | Edmonton Oilers | San Jose Sharks | STL's 3rd-round pick in 2015 | |
| May 20, 2015 | Mike Babcock | Head coach | Toronto Maple Leafs | Detroit Red Wings | 3rd-round pick in 2017 | |
| May 28, 2015 | Dan Bylsma | Head coach | Buffalo Sabres | Pittsburgh Penguins | VAN's 3rd-round pick in 2016 | |
| May 28, 2015 | Peter DeBoer | Head coach | San Jose Sharks | New Jersey Devils | 3rd-round pick in 2017 | |
| June 2, 2015 | John Hynes | Head coach | New Jersey Devils | Pittsburgh Penguins | 3rd-round pick in 2016 | |

== See also ==
- 2014 NHL entry draft
- 2015 NHL entry draft
- 2016 NHL entry draft
- 2014 in sports
- 2015 in sports
- 2013–14 NHL transactions
- 2015–16 NHL transactions
