= Rob McVicar =

Canadian ice hockey player

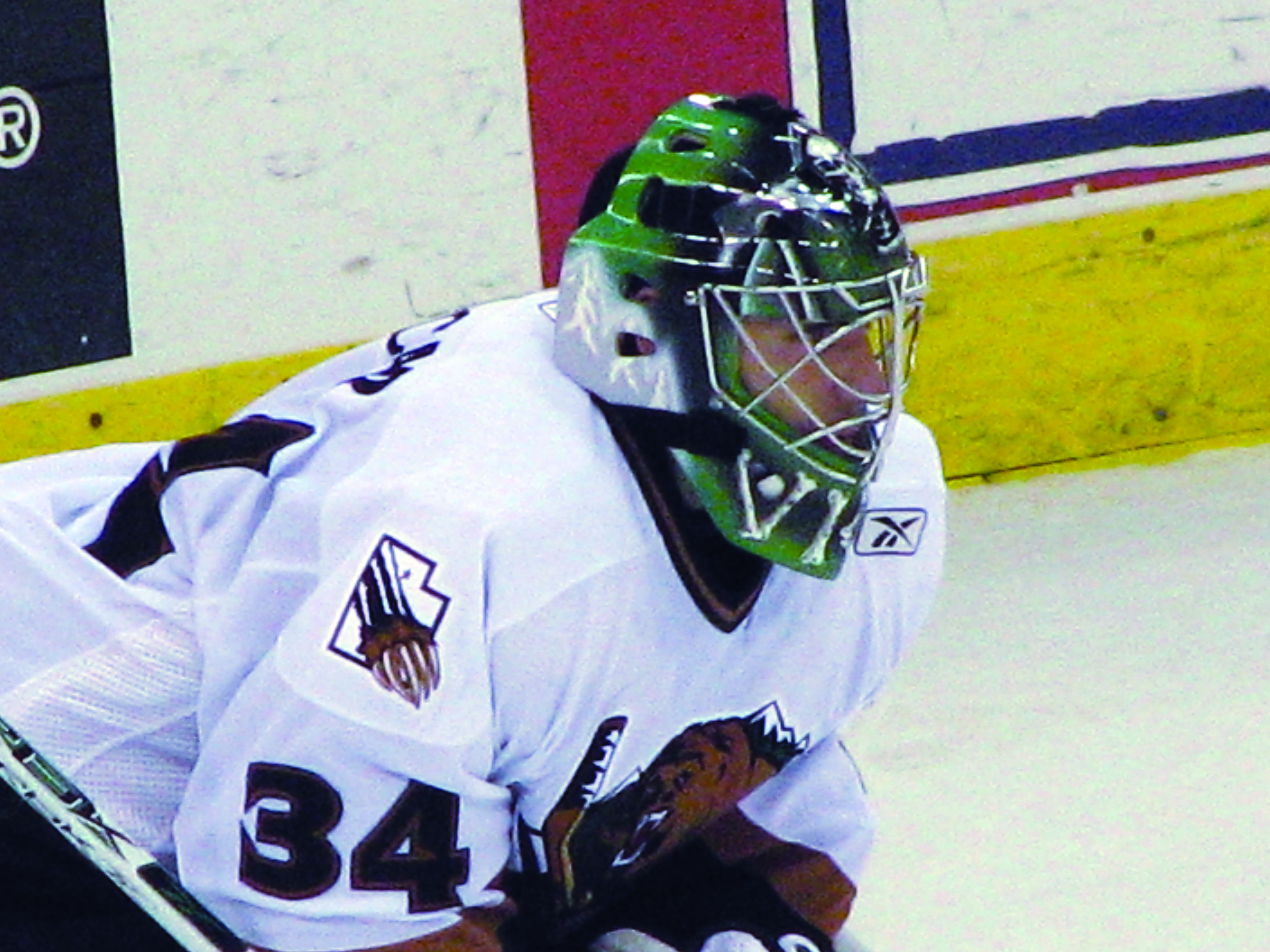
- Born: January 15, 1982 (age 44) Hay River, Northwest Territories, Canada
- Height: 6 ft 4 in (193 cm)
- Weight: 201 lb (91 kg; 14 st 5 lb)
- Position: Goaltender
- Caught: Left
- Played for: NHL; Vancouver Canucks; AHL; Manitoba Moose; ECHL; Columbia Inferno; Victoria Salmon Kings; Utah Grizzlies; Elmira Jackals; CHL; Arizona Sundogs; Oddset Ligaen; Totempo HvIK
- NHL draft: 151st overall, 2002; Vancouver Canucks
- Playing career: 2003–2009

Robert McVicar (born January 15, 1982) is a Canadian former professional ice hockey goalie who played one game in the National Hockey League (NHL) for the Vancouver Canucks during the 2005–06 season. McVicar played major junior for the Brandon Wheat Kings of the Western Hockey League before being selected by the Canucks in the 2002 NHL entry draft. Turning professional in 2003 he played in the minor American Hockey League and ECHL before being called up and playing his lone NHL game on December 1, 2005, against the Edmonton Oilers, appearing for 3 minutes. He remained in the minor leagues for a further four seasons before retiring from hockey in 2009 and becoming a financial planner and stockbroker.

== Playing career ==
Born in Hay River, Northwest Territories, McVicar moved to Brandon, Manitoba at the age of four. As his older brother Jason played goal, McVicar followed suit. A fan of the local Brandon Wheat Kings, a major junior team that played in the Western Hockey League, McVicar was selected by them in the 1997 bantam draft, and spent one year with the team's midget club.

He played one season with the Trail Smoke Eaters of the British Columbia Hockey League before returning to Brandon and spending his rookie season as the backup goalie. Offered a scholarship to the University of Maine, McVicar went there in 2000 but was ruled ineligible by the NCAA so returned to Brandon in November of that year. With three goalies on the team, McVicar played limited minutes in the season but was named the starter for the 2001–02 season. After the season ended he was selected 151st overall by the Vancouver Canucks in the 2002 NHL entry draft, though McVicar remained with Brandon for one final year before turning professional.

For most of the three seasons, from 2003-2004 to 2005-2006, McVicar played in the AHL for the Manitoba Moose; except for 19 games played in the ECHL with the Columbia Inferno during the 2003-2004 season; 33 games played in the ECHL with the Victoria Salmon Kings during the 2005-2006 season; and one game played in the NHL with the Vancouver Canucks during the 2005–2006 season. In McVicar's only NHL appearance, on December 1, 2005, against the Edmonton Oilers, he played 3 minutes without facing a shot.

During the 2006–07 season, McVicar played in the ECHL with the Utah Grizzlies, and during the 2007-2008 season he played in the CHL with the Arizona Sundogs. He signed with Totempo HvIK for the 2008–09 season. His last season was spent in Germany.

== Post-playing career ==
After retiring from hockey, McVicar moved to Regina, Saskatchewan with his wife Laurie and two children. He took up a position as a certified financial planner and stockbroker with Edward Jones Investments.

== Career statistics ==
=== Regular season and playoffs ===
			Regular season									Playoffs
Season	Team	League	GP	W	L	T	MIN	GA	SO	GAA	SV%	GP	W	L	MIN	GA	SO	GAA	SV%
1999–00	Brandon Wheat Kings	WHL	14	5	6	0	687	43	0	3.76	.881	—	—	—	—	—	—	—	—
1999–00	Trail Smoke Eaters	BCHL	16	—	—	—	—	—	—	4.59	.881	—	—	—	—	—	—	—	—
2000–01	Brandon Wheat Kings	WHL	27	12	10	2	1537	76	0	2.97	.895	5	2	3	324	13	1	2.41	.927
2001–02	Brandon Wheat Kings	WHL	55	33	18	2	3276	151	1	2.77	.896	19	11	8	1255	44	1	2.10	.924
2002–03	Brandon Wheat Kings	WHL	51	31	14	5	3027	136	2	2.70	.898	13	6	7	737	32	0	2.61	.896
2003–04	Columbia Inferno	ECHL	19	11	5	2	1088	47	0	2.59	.909	—	—	—	—	—	—	—	—
2003–04	Manitoba Moose	AHL	10	4	3	2	514	25	0	2.92	.913	—	—	—	—	—	—	—	—
2004–05	Columbia Inferno	ECHL	34	14	14	5	2004	79	3	2.37	.920	—	—	—	—	—	—	—	—
2004–05	Manitoba Moose	AHL	1	0	1	0	62	3	0	2.92	.933	—	—	—	—	—	—	—	—
2005–06	Vancouver Canucks	NHL	1	0	0	0	3	0	0	0.00	1.000	—	—	—	—	—	—	—	—
2005–06	Victoria Salmon Kings	ECHL	33	13	14	2	1741	95	1	3.27	.902	—	—	—	—	—	—	—	—
2005–06	Manitoba Moose	AHL	6	3	3	0	337	17	0	3.03	.901	—	—	—	—	—	—	—	—
2006–07	Utah Grizzlies	ECHL	59	19	28	7	3310	205	1	3.72	.896	—	—	—	—	—	—	—	—
2007–08	Arizona Sundogs	CHL	17	11	4	2	—	59	0	3.66	.903	13	11	1	—	40	0	3.26	—
2008–09	Elmira Jackals	ECHL	1	1	0	0	60	2	0	2.00	.917	—	—	—	—	—	—	—	—
2008–09	Totempo HvIK	DEN	8	—	—	—	—	—	—	4.13	.871	—	—	—	—	—	—	—	—
NHL totals			1	0	0	0	3	0	0	0.00	1.000	—	—	—	—	—	—	—	—

== See also ==
- List of players who played only one game in the NHL
