= Arizona Sundogs =

Minor league pro ice hockey team

- League: Central Hockey League
- Conference: Berry
- Home arena: Tim's Toyota Center
- Colors: Black, Red, White, Silver, Gold
- Affiliates: Arizona Coyotes (NHL); Portland Pirates (AHL)

Franchise history
- 2006–2014: Arizona Sundogs

Championships
- Division titles: 1 (2007–08)
- Conference titles: 1 (2007–08)
- Ray Miron President's Cup: 1 (2007–08)

The Arizona Sundogs were a minor league professional ice hockey team based in Prescott Valley, Arizona. They played in the Central Hockey League from 2006 to 2014 with their home games at Tim's Toyota Center.

== History ==
The team name, Sundogs, refers to an atmospheric phenomenon primarily associated with the reflection of sunlight by small ice crystals in cirrus clouds, resulting in what appears to be two suns in the sky. The Sundogs' primary 'S' logo makes reference to this occurrence with large and small starbursts. The Sundogs served as an affiliate for the NHL's Colorado Avalanche during the 2006–2007 season and as an affiliate for the Phoenix Coyotes in the 2007–2008 and 2008–2009 seasons.

The Sundogs concluded their inaugural season in 2006–07 with 70 points and a 34–28–2 record, finishing second in the CHL's Southwest Division, two points back of eventual division champion the New Mexico Scorpions, and qualifying for the 2007 CHL Playoffs. Arizona went on to beat the Corpus Christi Rayz, 2–1, in overtime of Game 7 of the opening round, advancing to the Southern Conference Semifinals against division rival New Mexico. The Sundogs eventually fell, 3–2, to the Scorpions in Game 7. Brent Kelly represented the Sundogs in the 2007 CHL All-Star Game and led the CHL in goals in 2006-07 with 42 and finished third overall with 95 points.

During the 2007–08 season, the team clinched the CHL's Southwest Division regular season title, finishing with 84 points and a 39–19–6 record. Phoenix Coyotes prospect Alex Leavitt lead the league in scoring (128 points) and assists (88). The Sundogs opened the 2008 Ray Miron President's Cup Playoffs by defeating New Mexico in six games. They then defeated the 2007–08 Southern Conference regular season champion Laredo Bucks in seven games in the Southern Conference Finals before sweeping the defending Ray Miron President's Cup Champion Colorado Eagles in four straight games, winning the President's Cup in only their second year of existence. Goaltender Rob McVicar was named playoffs MVP, finishing with an 11–1 record and .913 save percentage. Leavitt, Tyler Redenbach and David Schlemko represented the Sundogs in the 2008 CHL All-Star Game as head coach and general manager Marco Pietroniro coached the Southern Conference All-Stars to an 11–6 win.

In 2008–09, the Sundogs finished with 59 points and a 27–32–5 record, missing the playoffs. During the 2009–10 season, the team finished with 54 points and a 24–34–6 mark. Joel Irving was the team's lone representative in the 2009 All-Star Game, tallying a goal in an 8–4 loss to the Colorado Eagles while Jon Landry was named to the 2010 All-Star Game. Landry recorded a goal and an assist in a 9–4 loss to the South Texas All-Stars.

Arizona closed out the 2010–11 season with a 25–31–10 record for 60 points, qualifying for the postseason for the third time in five seasons and first since the team's championship season in 2007–08. The Sundogs dropped their opening round best-of-five playoff series in four games to the Bossier-Shreveport Mudbugs. Kyle Hood finished as the team's leading scorer for the second straight season with 69 points (15g/54a) in 62 games. Second-year forward Joey Sides was the team's lone representative in the 2011 CHL All-Star Game, recording one assist and three shots in an 11–6 win over the host Rapid City Rush.

On March 4, 2011, the Sundogs and Tim's Toyota Center were named hosts of the 2012 Central Hockey League All-Star Game.

On August 20, 2014, Sundogs players were informed that the team has suspended operations and elected dormancy. The next day, an official press release was posted and stated they hope to return for the 2015–16 CHL season. The team later announced with the merging of the CHL and the ECHL in 2014 that they are looking into options to join the ECHL in 2015.

"At this time we were not able to submit our application into the ECHL, but have been in ongoing discussions with the ECHL about our options and ability to apply in the near future."

"To all of our Sundogs family, rest assured that we are working on a plan for a return in 2015," Sundogs majority owner Brad Fain said. "Our dedicated staff continues to work toward that end and returning to the ice."
