= Alex Leavitt =

Canadian ice hockey player

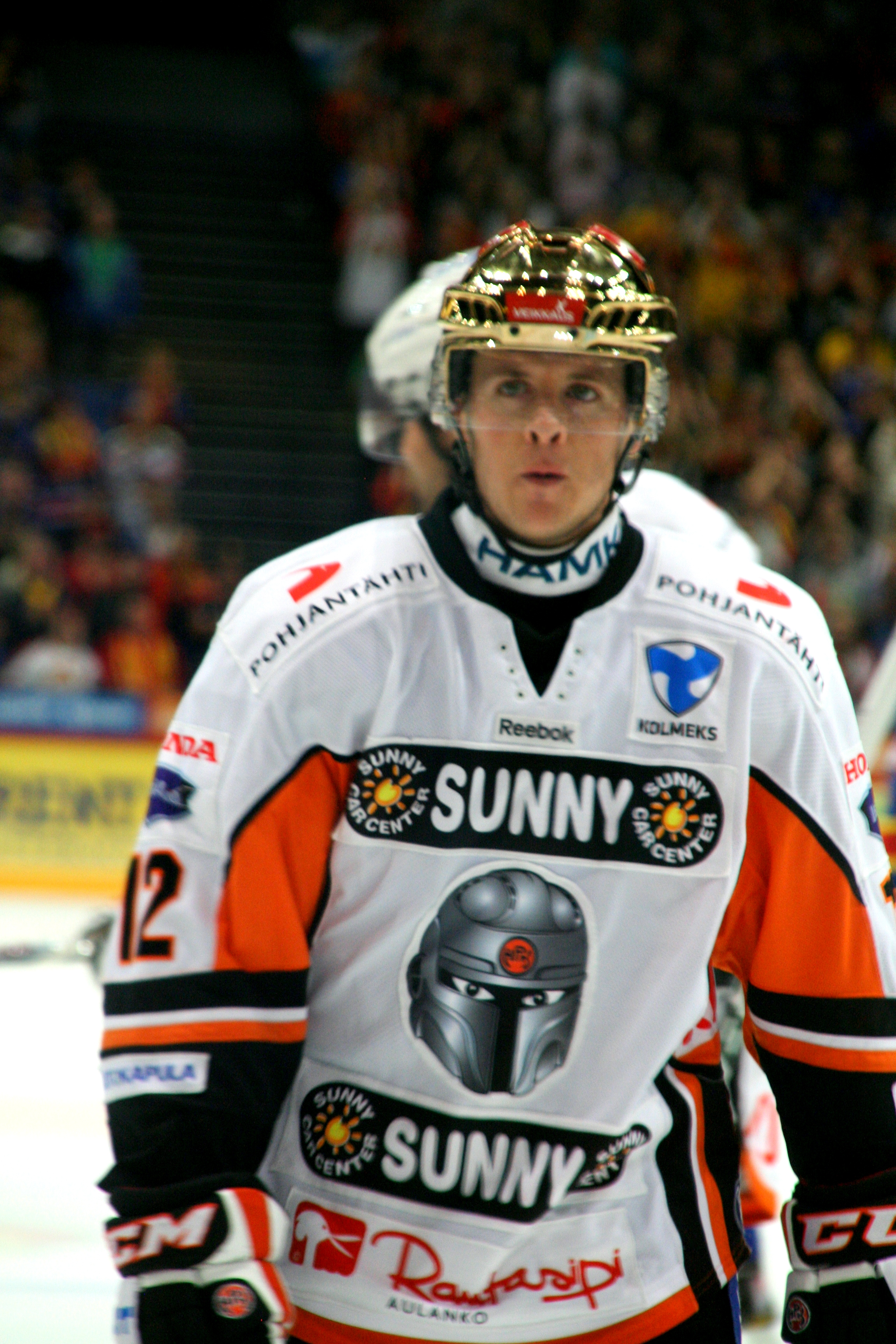
- Leavitt playing for HPK
- Born: January 31, 1984 (age 42) Edmonton, Alberta, Canada
- Height: 5 ft 10 in (178 cm)
- Weight: 174 lb (79 kg; 12 st 6 lb)
- Position: Centre
- Shot: Right
- Played for: Alaska Aces; Houston Aeros; Texas Wildcatters; San Antonio Rampage; Arizona Sundogs; Kassel Huskies; Ravensburg Towerstars; HPK; KHL Medveščak Zagreb; SERC Wild Wings; IK Oskarshamn; Aalborg Pirates; Braehead Clan
- NHL draft: Undrafted
- Playing career: 2005–2017

Alex Leavitt (born January 31, 1984) is a Canadian former professional ice hockey centre who last played for Braehead Clan in the Elite Ice Hockey League (EIHL).

== Career ==
Undrafted, Leavitt formerly played in the American Hockey League for the Houston Aeros and the San Antonio Rampage, the ECHL for the Alaska Aces and Texas Wildcatters and the Central Hockey League for the Arizona Sundogs before embarking on a European career in 2008.

He signed with the Kassel Huskies in the Deutsche Eishockey Liga and stayed for two seasons before moving to the 2nd Bundesliga for the Ravensburg Towerstars where he had a league leading 87 point season, including 55 assists as the Towerstars went on to win the championship. He moved on to Finland's SM-liiga with HPK in 2011, but was unable to match the same form of previous European seasons. In 2012-13 season, Leavitt had a brief spell in Austria's Erste Bank Eishockey Liga for KHL Medveščak Zagreb before returning to Germany and the 2nd Bundesliga for the SERC Wild Wings.

He then split the 2013-14 season in Sweden's HockeyAllsvenskan for Oskarshamns AIK and Denmark's Metal Ligaen for the Aalborg Pirates. While with Aalborg, Leavitt led the league with 61 points, his highest tally since the 2010-11 season, and made the league's Second All-Star Team. In 2014, Leavitt returned to the Ravensburg Towerstars, who were now playing in DEL2 which replaced the 2nd Bundesliga the previous year. On June 1, 2015, Leavitt signed a one-year contract for the 2015-16 season to play with Scottish club, Braehead Clan of the Elite Ice Hockey League, where he contributed 66 points for the season and led the league in assists with 45. He re-signed for a second season with the Clan and scored 69 points.

Leavitt announced his intention to retire in March 2017, following two years with Braehead.

== Career statistics ==
			Regular season					Playoffs
Season	Team	League	GP	G	A	Pts	PIM	GP	G	A	Pts	PIM
2000–01	Notre Dame Hounds	SJHL	58	26	32	58	56	—	—	—	—	—
2001–02	University of Wisconsin	WCHA	39	11	13	24	42	—	—	—	—	—
2002–03	University of Wisconsin	WCHA	28	2	13	15	24	—	—	—	—	—
2003–04	Swift Current Broncos	WHL	71	27	41	68	67	5	2	2	4	8
2004–05	Swift Current Broncos	WHL	15	3	11	14	27	—	—	—	—	—
2004–05	Everett Silvertips	WHL	49	13	35	48	43	11	6	5	11	6
2005–06	Alaska Aces	ECHL	72	26	65	91	58	16	1	12	13	28
2006–07	Houston Aeros	AHL	23	2	9	11	14	—	—	—	—	—
2006–07	Texas Wildcatters	ECHL	30	10	14	24	30	—	—	—	—	—
2006–07	San Antonio Rampage	AHL	16	10	10	20	22	—	—	—	—	—
2007–08	Arizona Sundogs	CHL	58	40	88	128	111	17	10	20	30	28
2007–08	San Antonio Rampage	AHL	4	1	2	3	6	—	—	—	—	—
2008–09	Kassel Huskies	DEL	52	17	37	54	64	—	—	—	—	—
2009–10	Kassel Huskies	DEL	54	10	29	39	62	—	—	—	—	—
2010–11	Ravensburg Towerstars	2.GBun	48	32	55	87	101	12	5	14	19	30
2011–12	HPK	SM-l	57	8	24	32	62	—	—	—	—	—
2012–13	KHL Medveščak Zagreb	EBEL	13	1	4	5	18	—	—	—	—	—
2012–13	SERC Wild Wings	2.GBun	32	13	35	48	20	15	10	10	20	42
2013–14	IK Oskarshamn	Allsv	10	1	2	3	12	—	—	—	—	—
2013–14	Aalborg Pirates	DEN	32	22	39	61	28	13	3	4	7	32
2014–15	Ravensburg Towerstars	DEL2	44	19	30	49	38	4	2	1	3	14
2015–16	Braehead Clan	EIHL	51	21	45	66	36	2	0	2	2	6
2016–17	Braehead Clan	EIHL	52	24	45	69	57	2	1	0	1	4
AHL totals			43	13	21	34	42	—	—	—	—	—

== Awards and honours ==
Award	Year
SJHL
Rookie of the Year	2000–01
ECHL
All-Rookie Team	2005–06
Rookie of the Year	2005–06
First All-Star Team	2005–06
Kelly Cup Champion	2005–06
CHL
First All-Star Team	2007–08
Ray Miron Cup Champion	2007–08
Playoff MVP	2007–08
Joe Burton Award	2007–08
AHL
Player of the Week (Mar 4.)	2006–07
2nd Bundesliga
Most Assists (55)	2010–11
Most Points (87)	2010–11
Denmark
Most Points (61)	2013–14
Second All-Star Team	2013–14
