= Jon Landry =

Canadian ice hockey player (born 1983)

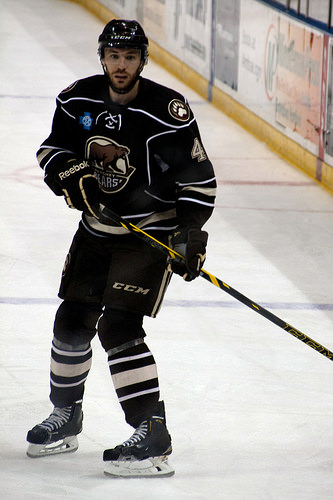
- Born: May 1, 1983 (age 43) Montreal, Quebec, Canada
- Height: 6 ft 3 in (191 cm)
- Weight: 220 lb (100 kg; 15 st 10 lb)
- Position: Defence
- Shot: Left
- Played for: Portland Pirates; Augusta Lynx; Arizona Sundogs; Kölner Haie; Braehead Clan; Colorado Eagles; Bridgeport Sound Tigers; Iowa Wild; Hershey Bears; Utica Comets
- NHL draft: Undrafted
- Playing career: 2006–2017

Jonathan Landry (born May 1, 1983) is a Canadian former professional ice hockey defenceman.

== Playing career ==
Undrafted, on July 1, 2012, Landry was signed belatedly to his first NHL contract on a one-year deal with the New York Islanders. Landry earned his contract from the previous season in an impressive try-out with the Islanders AHL affiliate, the Bridgeport Sound Tigers. He was reassigned to the Sound Tigers to begin the 2012–13 season. In 72 games with the Sound Tigers, Landry was productive from the blueline with 8 goals and 33 points. On January 13, 2013, he received his first NHL recall by the Islanders but did not feature in a game.

On July 9, 2013, Landry left the Islanders organization as a free agent and signed a one-year two-way contract with the Minnesota Wild. On July 1, 2014, Landry signed as a free agent to a one-year two-way contract with the Washington Capitals.

On November 20, 2015, Landry was offered a professional tryout with the Utica Comets of the AHL. Landry made an immediate impact on the blueline with the Comets in the 2015–16 season, and was later signed to a standard one-year deal on January 15, 2016. He finished the season posting 7 goals and 26 points in 47 games.

As a free agent, Landry continued in the AHL, returning for a second stint with the Bridgeport Sound Tigers in accepting a try-out offer to attend training camp for the 2016–17 season. He made the Sound Tigers' opening night roster and later signed a one-year deal with the club at the expiration of his PTO on December 16, 2016.

== Career statistics ==
			Regular season					Playoffs
Season	Team	League	GP	G	A	Pts	PIM	GP	G	A	Pts	PIM
2002–03	Bowdoin College	NESCAC	23	11	14	25	14	—	—	—	—	—
2003–04	Bowdoin College	NESCAC	24	13	20	33	20	—	—	—	—	—
2004–05	Bowdoin College	NESCAC	24	11	14	25	16	—	—	—	—	—
2005–06	Bowdoin College	NESCAC	27	16	22	38	37	—	—	—	—	—
2005–06	Portland Pirates	AHL	2	0	0	0	2	—	—	—	—	—
2006–07	Augusta Lynx	ECHL	2	1	0	1	2	—	—	—	—	—
2006–07	Arizona Sundogs	CHL	41	7	7	14	41	14	0	0	0	4
2007–08	Arizona Sundogs	CHL	60	9	33	42	70	17	3	6	9	14
2008–09	Arizona Sundogs	CHL	64	11	31	42	63	—	—	—	—	—
2009–10	Arizona Sundogs	CHL	38	9	22	31	54	—	—	—	—	—
2009–10	Kölner Haie	DEL	9	0	2	2	20	—	—	—	—	—
2010–11	Braehead Clan	EIHL	54	18	38	56	67	2	0	3	3	4
2011–12	Colorado Eagles	ECHL	35	12	18	30	44	—	—	—	—	—
2011–12	Bridgeport Sound Tigers	AHL	34	2	18	20	27	2	0	0	0	0
2012–13	Bridgeport Sound Tigers	AHL	72	8	25	33	57	—	—	—	—	—
2013–14	Iowa Wild	AHL	50	0	18	18	32	—	—	—	—	—
2014–15	Hershey Bears	AHL	64	3	11	14	38	5	1	0	1	0
2015–16	Utica Comets	AHL	47	7	19	26	38	2	0	2	2	10
2016–17	Bridgeport Sound Tigers	AHL	53	4	14	18	28	—	—	—	—	—
AHL totals			322	24	105	129	222	9	1	2	3	10
