= Ryan Gaucher =

Canadian ice hockey player

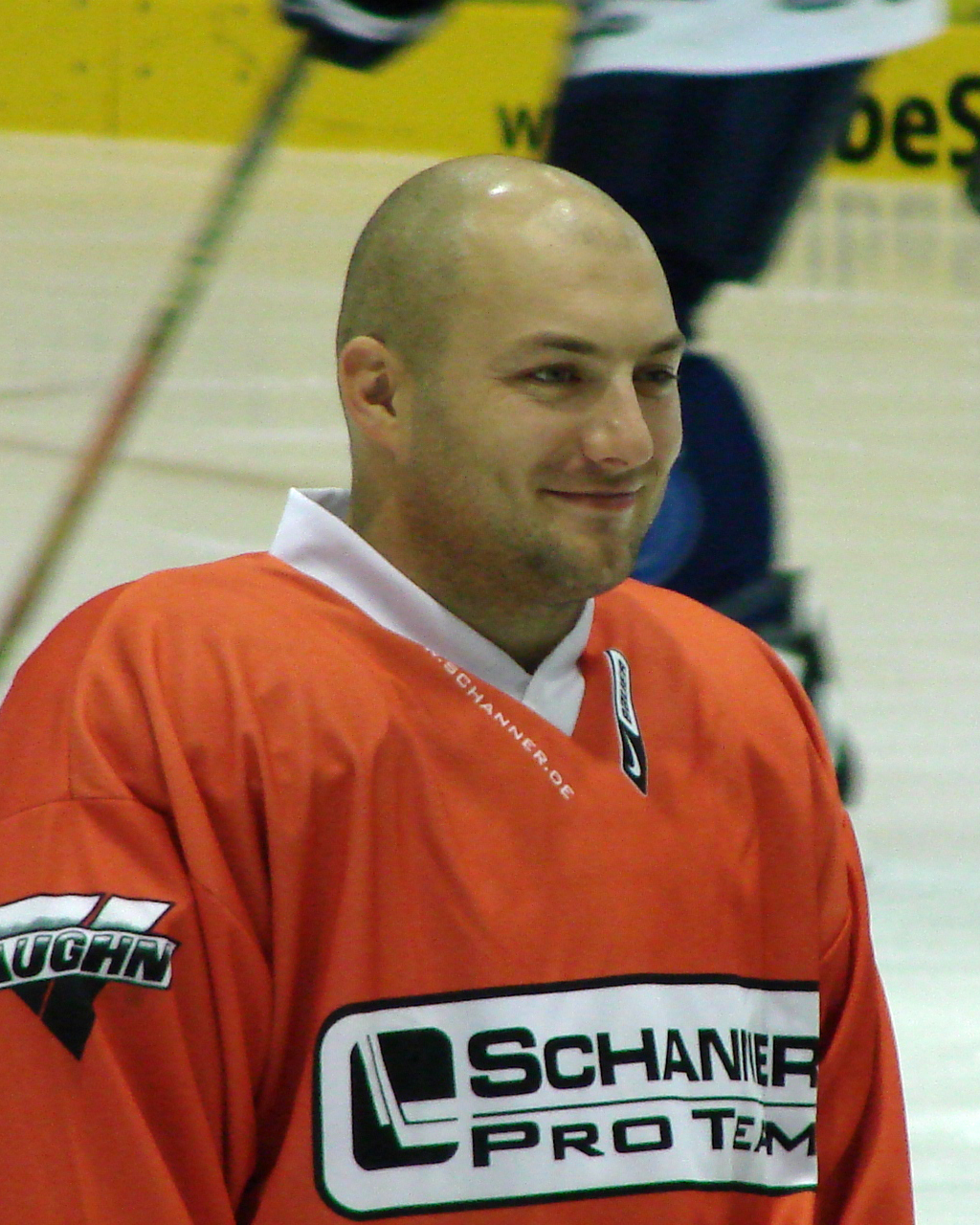
- Ryan Gaucher
- Born: February 23, 1978 (age 47); Saskatoon, Saskatchewan, Canada
- Height: 6 ft 0 in (183 cm)
- Weight: 192 lb (87 kg; 13 st 10 lb)
- Position: Defence
- Shot: Left
- Played for: Cincinnati Mighty Ducks; Cleveland Barons; Norfolk Admirals; Providence Bruins; EHC Linz; SønderjyskE; Kassel Huskies
- NHL draft: Undrafted
- Playing career: 1999–2014

Ryan Gaucher (born February 23, 1978) is a Canadian former professional ice hockey defenceman.

Gaucher spent the majority of his career playing in the ECHL and in Europe. He was twice named into the ECHL First All-Star Team, in 2003 while with the Cincinnati Cyclones and in 2006 with the Alaska Aces where he also won the Kelly Cup. He moved to Europe in 2006, playing in the Austrian Hockey League for EHC Linz, the Metal Ligaen for SønderjyskE and the Deutsche Eishockey Liga for the Kassel Huskies.

== Awards and honours ==
Award	Year
ECHL First All-Star Team	2002–03
ECHL First All-Star Team	2005–06
