= 2007–08 CHL season =

- League: Central Hockey League
- Sport: Ice hockey

Regular season
- Governors’ Cup: Bossier-Shreveport
- Season MVP: Jeff Bes (Laredo)
- Top scorer: Alex Leavitt (Arizona)

Playoffs
- Northern champions: Colorado Eagles
- Northern runners-up: Texas Brahmas
- Southern champions: Arizona Sundogs
- Southern runners-up: Laredo Bucks
- Playoffs MVP: Rob McVicar (Arizona)

Finals
- Champions: Arizona Sundogs
- Runners-up: Colorado Eagles

CHL seasons
- 2006–07 2008–09

The 2007–08 CHL season was the 16th season of the Central Hockey League (CHL).

== Teams ==
2007-08 Central Hockey League
Conference	Team	City	Arena
Northern	Bossier-Shreveport Mudbugs	Bossier City, Louisiana	CenturyTel Center
Northern	Colorado Eagles	Loveland, Colorado	Budweiser Events Center
Northern	Mississippi RiverKings	Southaven, Mississippi	DeSoto Civic Center
Northern	Oklahoma City Blazers	Oklahoma City, Oklahoma	Ford Center
Northern	Rocky Mountain Rage	Broomfield, Colorado	Broomfield Event Center
Northern	Texas Brahmas	North Richland Hills, Texas	NYTEX Sports Centre
Northern	Tulsa Oilers	Tulsa, Oklahoma	Tulsa Coliseum
Northern	Wichita Thunder	Wichita, Kansas	Britt Brown Arena
Northern	Youngstown SteelHounds	Youngstown, Ohio	Covelli Center
Southern	Amarillo Gorillas	Amarillo, Texas	Amarillo Civic Center
Southern	Arizona Sundogs	Prescott Valley, Arizona	Tim's Toyota Center
Southern	Austin Ice Bats	Austin, Texas	Chaparral Ice
Southern	Corpus Christi Rayz	Corpus Christi, Texas	American Bank Center
Southern	Laredo Bucks	Laredo, Texas	Laredo Entertainment Center
Southern	New Mexico Scorpions	Rio Rancho, New Mexico	Santa Ana Star Center
Southern	Odessa Jackalopes	Odessa, Texas	Ector County Coliseum
Southern	Rio Grande Valley Killer Bees	Hidalgo, Texas	Dodge Arena

== Map of teams ==
Northern Conference Southern Conference

== Regular season ==
=== Conference standings ===
Northern Conference	GP	W	L	T	GF	GA	Pts
y-Bossier-Shreveport Mudbugs	64	44	14	3	214	122	94
x-Youngstown SteelHounds	64	39	20	1	222	192	83
x-Texas Brahmas	64	40	20	1	222	192	83
x-Mississippi RiverKings	64	39	21	3	214	177	82
x-Colorado Eagles	64	37	20	2	254	223	81
e-Rocky Mountain Rage	64	36	22	5	241	220	78
e-Oklahoma City Blazers	64	28	30	2	188	193	62
e-Tulsa Oilers	64	25	35	3	194	243	54
e-Wichita Thunder	64	20	42	1	156	247	42

Southern Conference	GP	W	L	T	GF	GA	Pts
y-Laredo Bucks	64	42	19	3	233	161	87
x-Arizona Sundogs	64	39	19	6	294	242	84
x-New Mexico Scorpions	64	34	24	6	236	231	74
x-Odessa Jackalopes	64	32	25	7	211	210	71
x-Austin Ice Bats	64	29	33	2	183	195	60
e-Amarillo Gorillas	64	22	32	10	218	265	54
e-Corpus Christi Rayz	64	22	34	8	183	195	52
e-Rio Grande Valley Killer Bees	64	16	41	7	171	278	39

Note: y - clinched conference title; x - clinched playoff spot; e - eliminated from playoff contention

== Playoffs ==
=== Playoff Bracket ===
First Round 1
N4	Texas	2
N5	Mississippi	1
S4	Odessa	2
S5	Austin	1

Conference Semi-finals
N1	Bossier-Shreveport	0
N4	Texas	4
Northern
N2	Colorado	4
N3	Youngstown	1
S2	Arizona	4
S3	New Mexico	2
Southern
S1	Laredo	4
S4	Odessa	0

Conference Finals
N2	Colorado	4
N4	Texas	3
S1	Laredo	3
S2	Arizona	4

Ray Miron President's Cup Finals
N2	Colorado	0
S2	Arizona	4

== Awards ==
Source:Central Hockey League Historical Award Winners

- Ray Miron President's Cup (Playoff Champions) - Arizona Sundogs
- Governors’ Cup (regular-season champions) - Bossier-Shreveport Mudbugs
- Most Valuable Player - Jeff Bes, Laredo
- Most Outstanding Goaltender - John DeCaro, Bossier-Shreveport
- Most Outstanding Defenseman - Vladimir Hartinger, New Mexico
- Rookie of the Year - David Nimmo, Amarillo
- Coach of the Year - Scott Muscutt, Bossier-Shreveport
- Man of the Year - Stacey Bauman, Oklahoma City
- Rick Kozuback Award - Chris Stewart, Colorado
- Joe Burton Award (Scoring Champion) - Alex Leavitt, Arizona
- Playoff Most Valuable Player - Rob McVicar, Arizona
- All-Star Game Most Valuable Player (North) - Brent Cullaton, Rocky Mountain
- All-Star Game Most Valuable Player (South) - Alex Leavitt, Arizona
- Athletic Trainer of the Year – Wade Sundbye, Oklahoma City
- Equipment Manager of the Year– Patrick Stevens, Rocky Mountain

=== All-CHL Team ===
- Forward: Jeff Bes, Laredo
- Forward: Alex Leavitt, Arizona
- Forward: Brent Cullaton, Rocky Mountain
- Defenseman: Vladimir Hartinger, New Mexico
- Defenseman: Aaron Schneekloth, Colorado
- Goaltender : John DeCaro, Bossier-Shreveport

=== All-Rookie Team ===
- Forward - Tyler Skworchinski, Texas
- Forward - Mark Kolanos, Arizona
- Forward - David Nimmo, Amarillo
- Defenseman - Shaun Arvai, Amarillo
- Defenseman - David Schlemko, Arizona
- Goaltender - Alexandre Vincent, Odessa
