= David Schlemko =

Canadian ice hockey player (born 1987)

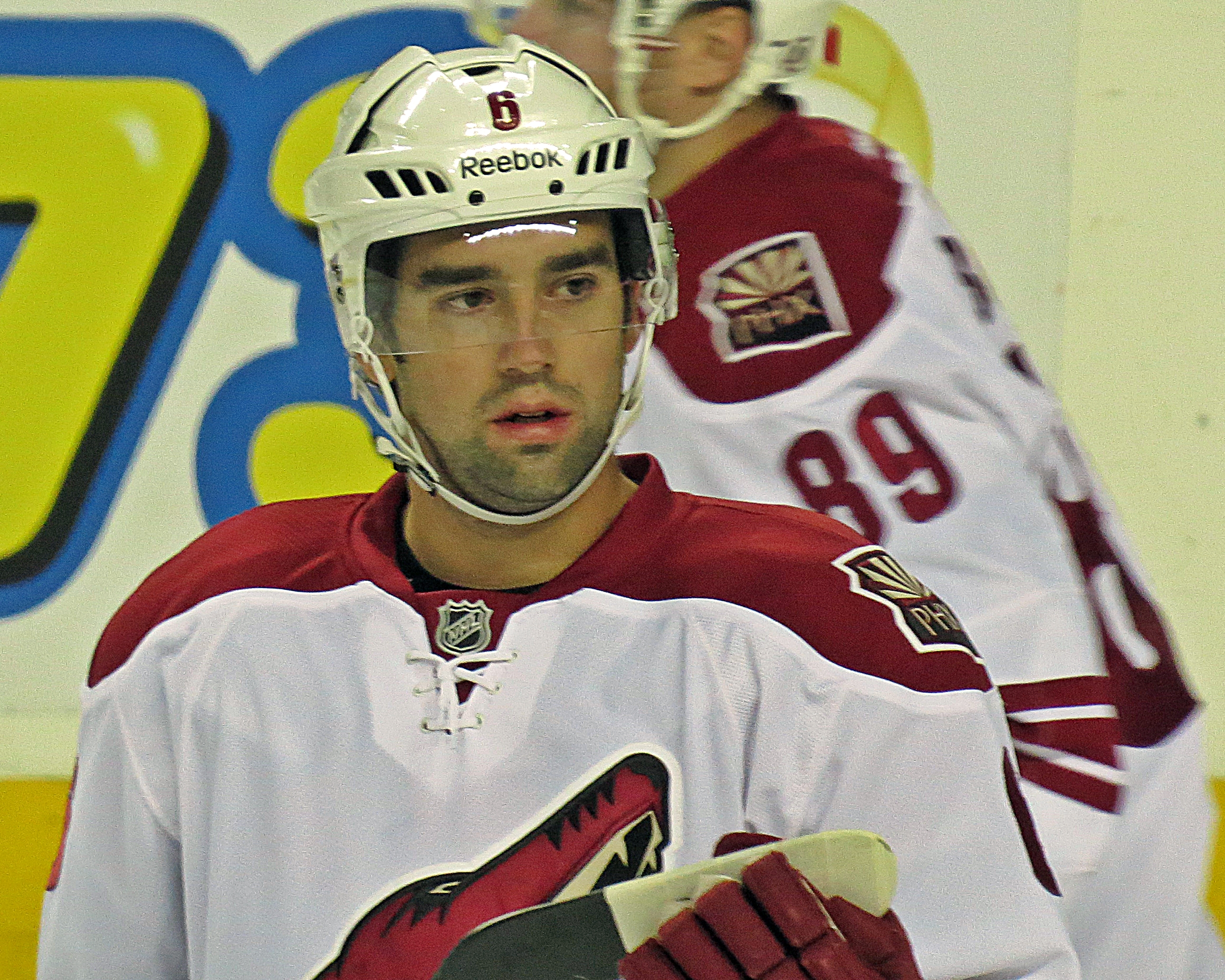
- Schlemko with the Phoenix Coyotes in 2014
- Born: May 7, 1987 (age 39) Edmonton, Alberta, Canada
- Height: 6 ft 0 in (183 cm)
- Weight: 190 lb (86 kg; 13 st 8 lb)
- Position: Defence
- Shot: Left
- Played for: Arizona Coyotes; Dallas Stars; Calgary Flames; New Jersey Devils; San Jose Sharks; Montreal Canadiens
- NHL draft: Undrafted
- Playing career: 2007–2019

David Schlemko (born May 7, 1987) is a Canadian former professional ice hockey defenceman who played eleven seasons in the National Hockey League (NHL).

== Playing career ==
Schlemko played junior hockey for the Medicine Hat Tigers of the Western Hockey League from 2004 until 2007. He was a member of the Tigers' WHL championship team in 2007. Undrafted, Schlemko was signed as a free agent on July 19, 2007, by the Coyotes to a three-year entry-level contract and was assigned to the Central Hockey League's Arizona Sundogs. In 2008, Schlemko was assigned to the San Antonio Rampage. He made his NHL debut with the Coyotes during the 2008–09 season, playing a total of 3 games scoring 1 assist. His first career NHL goal was scored on November 14, 2009, against Marty Turco of the Dallas Stars.

During the 2012–13 NHL lockout, Schlemko played 14 games for the Arizona Sundogs of the Central Hockey League (CHL).

In the 2014–15 season, on January 3, 2015, Schlemko was claimed off waivers by the Dallas Stars. Schlemko played in 5 scoreless games with the Stars as a reserve defenseman before he was again placed and claimed off waivers by the Calgary Flames on March 1, 2015.

As a free agent on September 10, 2015, Schlemko joined his fourth organization within a year by signing a one-year contract with the New Jersey Devils. As a late free-agent addition to the Devils, Schlemko surprised in the 2015–16 season, to solidify his role on the blueline and record a career-high 6 goals and 19 points in 67 games.

On July 1, 2016, Schlemko was rewarded from his tenure with the Devils by signing a four-year contract as a free agent with the San Jose Sharks. In the 2016–17 season, Schlemko solidified the Sharks blueline, appearing in 62 games in matching his previous season 6 goals while contributing with 18 points.

Schlemko's tenure with the Sharks was limited to one season as he was selected by the Vegas Golden Knights in the 2017 NHL Expansion Draft on June 21, 2017. The following day, the Golden Knights promptly dealt him to the Montreal Canadiens in exchange for a fifth-round draft pick in 2019. Schlemko missed the beginning of the 2017–18 season with the Canadiens after breaking his hand on his first day of training camp with the club. Nearing a return from injury, Schlemko played one game on a conditioning stint with AHL affiliate, the Laval Rocket, before suffering a setback in requiring surgery to remove bone fragments in his hand on October 19, 2017. Schlemko missed the first 25 games of the season before returning to make 37 appearances and adding 1 goal and four assists.

For a second consecutive year, Schlemko was placed on the injured reserve list to begin the 2018–19 season, after injuring his knee in a pre-season game on September 29, 2018. Schlemko returned to action to appear in 18 games on the blueline for the Canadiens for 2 assists before he was placed on waivers and demoted to the Laval Rocket on January 8, 2019. Schlemko registered 4 points in 8 games for the Rockets before he was traded by the Canadiens with Byron Froese to the Philadelphia Flyers in exchange for Dale Weise and Christian Folin on February 9, 2019. Schlemko reported directly to AHL affiliate, the Lehigh Valley Phantoms, and played out the remainder of the regular season to appear in 18 games for 4 assists.

On June 30, 2019, Schlemko was placed on unconditional waivers by the Flyers in order to buy out the remaining year on his contract.

== Career statistics ==
			Regular season					Playoffs
Season	Team	League	GP	G	A	Pts	PIM	GP	G	A	Pts	PIM
2004–05	Medicine Hat Tigers	WHL	65	5	24	29	23	13	0	3	3	10
2005–06	Medicine Hat Tigers	WHL	69	9	35	44	44	13	2	5	7	15
2006–07	Medicine Hat Tigers	WHL	64	8	50	58	78	23	3	13	16	12
2007–08	Arizona Sundogs	CHL	58	10	29	39	24	14	3	5	8	6
2007–08	San Antonio Rampage	AHL	1	0	0	0	4	—	—	—	—	—
2008–09	San Antonio Rampage	AHL	68	7	22	29	20	—	—	—	—	—
2008–09	Phoenix Coyotes	NHL	3	0	1	1	0	—	—	—	—	—
2009–10	San Antonio Rampage	AHL	55	5	26	31	30	—	—	—	—	—
2009–10	Phoenix Coyotes	NHL	17	1	4	5	8	—	—	—	—	—
2010–11	Phoenix Coyotes	NHL	43	4	10	14	24	4	1	0	1	4
2010–11	San Antonio Rampage	AHL	3	0	0	0	2	—	—	—	—	—
2011–12	Phoenix Coyotes	NHL	46	1	10	11	10	5	0	0	0	0
2012–13	Arizona Sundogs	CHL	14	3	7	10	4	—	—	—	—	—
2012–13	Phoenix Coyotes	NHL	30	1	5	6	12	—	—	—	—	—
2013–14	Phoenix Coyotes	NHL	48	1	8	9	18	—	—	—	—	—
2014–15	Arizona Coyotes	NHL	20	1	3	4	4	—	—	—	—	—
2014–15	Portland Pirates	AHL	2	1	3	4	0	—	—	—	—	—
2014–15	Dallas Stars	NHL	5	0	0	0	0	—	—	—	—	—
2014–15	Calgary Flames	NHL	19	0	0	0	8	11	0	1	1	2
2015–16	New Jersey Devils	NHL	67	6	13	19	16	—	—	—	—	—
2016–17	San Jose Sharks	NHL	62	6	12	18	14	6	2	1	3	2
2017–18	Laval Rocket	AHL	3	0	1	1	0	—	—	—	—	—
2017–18	Montreal Canadiens	NHL	37	1	4	5	6	—	—	—	—	—
2018–19	Montreal Canadiens	NHL	18	0	2	2	4	—	—	—	—	—
2018–19	Laval Rocket	AHL	8	1	3	4	2	—	—	—	—	—
2018–19	Lehigh Valley Phantoms	AHL	18	0	4	4	4	—	—	—	—	—
NHL totals			415	18	76	94	124	26	3	2	5	8

== Awards and honours ==
Award	Year
WHL
East Second All-Star Team	2007
