= John M. Hartinger =

American politician

John M. Hartinger (born February 15, 1955) was an American politician and clergyman.

Hartinger was born in Minnesota and lived in Coon Rapids, Minnesota with his wife and family. He received his bachelor's degree from Pillsbury Baptist Bible College and his master's and doctorate degrees from Trinity Theological Seminary. He served as a pastor of a church and was a high school teacher. Hartinger served in the Minnesota House of Representatives in 1985 and 1986 and was a Republican.
