= 2005–06 ECHL season =

Ice hockey league season

- League: ECHL
- Sport: Ice hockey
- Duration: October 2005 – May 2006

Regular season
- Brabham Cup: Alaska Aces
- Season MVP: Jeff Campbell (Gwinnett)
- Top scorer: Alex Leavitt (Alaska)

Playoffs
- American champions: Gwinnett Gladiators
- American runners-up: Toledo Storm
- National champions: Alaska Aces
- National runners-up: Fresno Falcons
- Playoffs MVP: Mike Scott (Alaska)

Finals
- Champions: Alaska Aces
- Runners-up: Gwinnett Gladiators

ECHL seasons
- ← 2004–05 2006–07 →

The 2005–06 ECHL season was the 18th season of the ECHL, a professional ice-hockey league based in the United States. The season ran from late October 2005 to early June 2006. The Brabham Cup regular season champions and Kelly Cup playoff champions were the Alaska Aces.

== League changes ==
At the end of the 2004–05 season, the Pee Dee Pride and Louisiana IceGators franchises ceased operations, with the Florence-based Pride announcing a move to nearby Conway (in the Myrtle Beach area; the cities of Florence and Myrtle Beach are considered one market for television purposes) while awaiting completion of the new Atlantic Center Arena that eventually never happened. The ECHL eventually revoked the franchise at the 2009 Board of Governors meeting. The Peoria Rivermen franchise also ceased operations when the ownership acquired an AHL franchise and under the same name.

The league also approved of Barry Kemp's Ontario, California, expansion franchise rights to be transferred to play in Bloomington, Illinois, in May 2004. After an apparent fallout among the Bloomington Partners and the nearby Peoria Rivermen transferring to the AHL, the Bloomington ECHL franchise was sold to Legacy Partners, LLC, headed by Phoenix Suns' majority owner Robert Sarver and the franchise was relocated as the Phoenix RoadRunners as the only expansion team for the season.

The Atlantic City Boardwalk Bullies were sold and relocated to Stockton, California, as the Stockton Thunder. The Utah Grizzlies' new ownership also bought the former Lexington Men O' War franchise that had been dormant since 2003 after the American Hockey League's Grizzlies ceased operations.

Just prior to the start of the season, the Texas Wildcatters and the Mississippi Sea Wolves were both forced to sit out the season due to damage caused by Hurricanes Katrina and Rita. The Wildcatters were given permission to re-enter the league for the 2006–07 season, while the Sea Wolves were allowed to return for the 2007–08 season.

While most leagues adopted the entire NHL rule change package for 2005–06 (based on the 2004–05 AHL rule changes), the ECHL kept the shootout at five players, and kept the automatic icing rule which has been used in the league.

== All-Star Game ==
The ECHL All-Star Game was held at the Save Mart Center in Fresno, California, and was hosted by the Fresno Falcons. The National Conference All-Stars defeated the American Conference All-Stars 7–6, with Fresno's Luke Curtin named Most Valuable Player.

== Regular season ==
=== Final standings ===
Note: GP = Games played; W = Wins; L= Losses; OTL = Overtime Losses; SOL = Shootout Losses; GF = Goals for; GA = Goals against; Pts = Points; Green shade = Clinched playoff spot; Blue shade = Clinched division; (z) = Clinched home-ice advantage

==== American Conference ====
North Division	GP	W	L	OTL	SOL	PTS	GF	GA
Toledo Storm (DET/SJS)	72	46	21	3	2	97	244	189
Wheeling Nailers (PIT)	72	45	21	3	3	96	247	186
Reading Royals (LAK)	72	42	23	3	4	91	249	209
Johnstown Chiefs (TBL)	72	30	26	4	12	76	223	243
Trenton Titans (PHI/NYI)	72	31	36	2	3	67	166	214
Dayton Bombers (CBJ)	72	20	46	4	2	46	193	275

South Division	GP	W	L	OTL	SOL	PTS	GF	GA
Gwinnett Gladiators (z) (ATL)	72	50	15	0	7	107	304	208
Florida Everblades (CAR/FLA)	72	48	20	3	1	100	267	208
Greenville Grrrowl (CHI/EDM)	72	44	25	0	3	93	248	203
South Carolina Stingrays (WSH)	72	32	25	7	8	79	230	237
Charlotte Checkers (NYR)	72	34	33	2	3	73	226	250
Augusta Lynx (Ind.)	72	30	36	1	5	66	216	255
Columbia Inferno (VAN)	72	25	39	3	5	58	209	290
Pensacola Ice Pilots (TOR)	72	21	44	5	2	49	194	293

==== National Conference ====
West Division	GP	W	L	OTL	SOL	PTS	GF	GA
Alaska Aces (z) (STL)	72	53	12	5	2	113	289	168
Las Vegas Wranglers (CGY)	72	53	13	4	2	112	267	176
Idaho Steelheads (DAL)	72	43	21	4	4	94	268	221
Utah Grizzlies (Ind.)	72	36	30	5	1	78	235	236
Victoria Salmon Kings (Ind.)	72	26	37	5	4	61	204	261
Phoenix RoadRunners (Ind.)	72	20	47	1	4	45	156	263

Pacific Division	GP	W	L	OTL	SOL	PTS	GF	GA
Fresno Falcons (SJS)	72	43	15	5	9	100	230	205
Bakersfield Condors (Ind.)	72	40	26	2	4	86	221	222
Long Beach Ice Dogs (MTL)	72	36	27	4	5	81	210	217
San Diego Gulls (COL)	72	34	30	4	4	76	213	214
Stockton Thunder (PHX)	72	18	40	7	7	48	192	260

=== Scoring leaders ===
Note: GP = Games played; G = Goals; A = Assists; Pts = Points; PIM = Penalty minutes

Player	Team	GP	G	A	Pts
Alex Leavitt	Alaska	72	26	65	91
Mike Scott	Alaska	72	37	50	87
D'Arcy McConvey	Idaho	58	39	47	86
Ryan Kinasewich	Utah	60	39	46	85
Jeff Campbell	Gwinnett	62	30	53	83
Luke Curtin	Fresno	64	21	61	82
Daniel Sisca	Florida	71	29	50	79
Matt Dzieduszycki	Las Vegas	68	34	44	78
Sean Collins	Wheeling	62	27	49	76
Scott Cameron	South Carolina	68	22	50	72
Justin Kelley	Johnstown	59	31	40	71

=== Leading goaltenders ===
Note: GP = Games played; Mins = Minutes played; W = Wins; L = Losses; T = Ties; GA = Goals allowed; SO = Shutouts; GAA = Goals against average

Player	Team	GP	Mins	W	L	T	GA	SO	SV%	GAA
Drew MacIntyre	Toledo	33	1981	24	7	2	68	2	.926	2.06
Andy Franck	Wheeling	55	3214	33	15	5	122	5	.919	2.28
Matt Underhill	Alaska	50	2979	36	10	3	113	5	.917	2.28
Marc Magliarditi	Las Vegas	51	2985	34	11	5	123	3	.909	2.47
Cody Rudkowsky	Reading	38	2291	24	11	3	96	2	.916	2.51

== Kelly Cup playoffs ==
=== Bracket ===
Division Quarters

April 9–12

Division Semis

April 14–22

Division Finals

April 24-May 2

Conference Finals

May 5–16

N1
Toledo
3

N4
Johnstown
2

N4
Johnstown
0

N5
Trenton
0

N1
Toledo
3

N2
Wheeling
2

N2
Wheeling
3

N3
Reading
1

N1
Toledo
1

S1
Gwinnett
4

S1
Gwinnett
3

S4
South Carolina
2

S4
South Carolina
0

S5
Charlotte
1

S1
Gwinnett
3

S2
Florida
1

S2
Florida
3

S3
Greenville
2

S3
Greenville
1

S6
Augusta
0

==== Division quarterfinals ====
North Division Quarterfinals Johnstown vs. Trenton
Date	Away	Home	
April 10	Trenton 1	Johnstown 2	OT
April 11	Johnstown 4	Trenton 3	
Johnstown wins series 2–0

South Division Quarterfinals South Carolina vs. Charlotte
Date	Away	Home
April 10	Charlotte 3	South Carolina 6
April 11	South Carolina 3	Charlotte 4
April 12	Charlotte 1	South Carolina 3
South Carolina wins series 2–1

South Division Quarterfinals Greenville vs. Augusta
Date	Away	Home	
April 9	Augusta 1	Greenville 2	
April 11	Greenville 3	Augusta 2	OT
Greenville wins series 2–0

==== Division semifinals ====
North Division Semifinals Toledo vs. Johnstown
Date	Away	Home
April 14	Johnstown 2	Toledo 3
April 15	Johnstown 1	Toledo 4
April 19	Toledo 5	Johnstown 3
Toledo wins series 3–0

North Division Semifinals Reading vs. Wheeling
Date	Away	Home	
April 14	Wheeling 3	Reading 2	OT
April 16	Reading 4	Wheeling 1	
April 18	Reading 3	Wheeling 4	
April 19	Wheeling 5	Reading 4	
Wheeling wins series 3–1

South Division Semifinals Gwinnett vs. South Carolina
Date	Away	Home	
April 15	South Carolina 3	Gwinnett 5	
April 16	South Carolina 4	Gwinnett 5	OT
April 19	Gwinnett 3	South Carolina 1	
Gwinnett wins series 3–0

South Division Semifinals Florida vs. Greenville
Date	Away	Home	
April 14	Greenville 4	Florida 5	OT
April 15	Greenville 2	Florida 4	
April 21	Florida 0	Greenville 1	OT
April 22	Florida 9	Greenville 4	
Florida wins series 3–1

==== Division finals ====
North Division Finals Toledo vs. Wheeling
Date	Away	Home	
April 24	Wheeling 4	Toledo 5	OT
April 26	Wheeling 5	Toledo 3	
April 28	Toledo 0	Wheeling 6	
April 29	Toledo 3	Wheeling 1	
May 2	Wheeling 2	Toledo 3	
Toledo wins Series 3–2

South Division Finals Gwinnett vs. Florida
Date	Away	Home
April 26	Florida 3	Gwinnett 5
April 28	Florida 7	Gwinnett 3
April 29	Gwinnett 6	Florida 4
May 1	Gwinnett 7	Florida 4
Gwinnett wins series 3–1

==== Conference finals ====
American Conference Finals Toledo vs. Gwinnett
Date	Away	Home	
May 5	Toledo 3	Gwinnett 5	
May 8	Toledo 4	Gwinnett 3	OT
May 12	Gwinnett 4	Toledo 2	
May 14	Gwinnett 4	Toledo 2	
May 16	Gwinnett 3	Toledo 2	OT
Gwinnett wins series 4–1

=== Bracket ===
Division Semifinals; April 10–22
W1	Alaska	4
W4	Utah	0
W2	Las Vegas	4
W3	Idaho	0
P2	Bakersfield	4
P3	Long Beach	3
P1	Fresno	4
P4	San Diego	3

Division Finals; April 24-May 6
W1	Alaska	4
W2	Las Vegas	3
P2	Bakersfield	3
P1	Fresno	4

Conference Finals; May 8–22
W1	Alaska	4
P1	Fresno	3

==== Division semifinals ====
West Division Semifinals Alaska vs. Utah
Date	Away	Home
April 10	Utah 1	Alaska 4
April 11	Utah 1	Alaska 3
April 13	Alaska 4	Utah 1
April 14	Alaska 6	Utah 2
Alaska wins series 4–0

West Division Semifinals Las Vegas vs. Idaho
Date	Away	Home
April 11	Idaho 0	Las Vegas 4
April 12	Idaho 0	Las Vegas 2
April 14	Las Vegas 5	Idaho 4
April 15	Las Vegas 4	Idaho 2
Las Vegas wins series 4–0

Pacific Division Semifinals Fresno vs. San Diego
Date	Away	Home	
April 11	San Diego 3	Fresno 4	
April 12	San Diego 1	Fresno 4	
April 14	Fresno 2	San Diego 1	OT
April 15	Fresno 1	San Diego 5	
April 17	San Diego 3	Fresno 2	
April 20	Fresno 3	San Diego 4	OT
April 22	San Diego 0	Fresno 2	
Fresno wins series 4–3

Pacific Division Semifinals Bakersfield vs. Long Beach
Date	Away	Home	
April 11	Long Beach 1	Bakersfield 3	
April 14	Long Beach 5	Bakersfield 4	
April 15	Bakersfield 6	Long Beach 3	
April 16	Bakersfield 4	Long Beach 5	
April 19	Bakersfield 4	Long Beach 1	
April 21	Long Beach 6	Bakersfield 2	
April 22	Long Beach 3	Bakersfield 4	OT
Bakersfield wins series 4–3

==== Division finals ====
West Division Finals Alaska vs. Las Vegas
Date	Away	Home	
April 24	Las Vegas 5	Alaska 0	
April 25	Las Vegas 3	Alaska 4	OT
April 27	Alaska 2	Las Vegas 6	
April 29	Alaska 3	Las Vegas 4	OT
April 30	Alaska 3	Las Vegas 1	
May 2	Las Vegas 0	Alaska 2	
May 5	Las Vegas 3	Alaska 4	3OT
Alaska wins series 4–3

Pacific Division Finals Fresno vs. Bakersfield
Date	Away	Home	
April 24	Bakersfield 3	Fresno 5	
April 25	Bakersfield 2	Fresno 4	
April 28	Fresno 2	Bakersfield 4	
April 29	Fresno 3	Bakersfield 2	OT
May 3	Fresno 2	Bakersfield 4	
May 5	Bakersfield 4	Fresno 3	OT
May 6	Bakersfield 2	Fresno 4	
Fresno wins series 4–3

==== Conference finals ====
National Conference Finals Alaska vs. Fresno
Date	Away	Home
May 8	Fresno 3	Alaska 2
May 10	Fresno 0	Alaska 2
May 12	Alaska 3	Fresno 4 OT
May 13	Alaska 3	Fresno 1
May 16	Alaska 3	Fresno 0
May 19	Fresno 4	Alaska 3
May 22	Fresno 2	Alaska 3 OT
Alaska wins series 4–3

=== Kelly Cup finals ===
Kelly Cup Finals Alaska vs. Gwinnett
Date	Away	Home
May 24	Gwinnett 2	Alaska 3
May 25	Gwinnett 3	Alaska 4
May 29	Alaska 5	Gwinnett 4
May 31	Alaska 1	Gwinnett 6
June 1	Alaska 4	Gwinnett 3
Alaska wins series and Kelly Cup 4–1

== ECHL awards ==
Patrick Kelly Cup:	Alaska Aces
Henry Brabham Cup:	Alaska Aces
Gingher Memorial Trophy:	Gwinnett Gladiators
Bruce Taylor Trophy:	Alaska Aces
John Brophy Award:	Glen Gulutzan (Las Vegas)
CCM TACKS Most Valuable Player:	Jeff Campbell (Gwinnett)
Kelly Cup Playoffs Most Valuable Player:	Mike Scott (Alaska)
Reebok Hockey Goaltender of the Year:	Matt Underhill (Alaska)
CCM Tacks Rookie of the Year:	Alex Leavitt (Alaska)
Defenseman of the Year:	Ryan Gaucher (Alaska)
Leading Scorer:	Alex Leavitt (Alaska)
Reebok Hockey Plus Performer Award:	Peter Metcalf (Alaska)
Sportsmanship Award:	Steve Saviano (Florida)

== See also ==
- List of ECHL seasons
- 2005 in sports
- 2006 in sports

Preceded by 2005 Kelly Cup playoffs	Kelly Cup Playoffs; 2006	Succeeded by 2007 Kelly Cup playoffs
