= Vladimír Hartinger =

Czech ice hockey player

- Born: July 16, 1979 (age 46) Šternberk, Czechoslovakia
- Height: 5 ft 11 in (180 cm)
- Weight: 198 lb (90 kg; 14 st 2 lb)
- Position: Defence
- Shot: Left
- Played for: CHL; Wichita Thunder; New Mexico Scorpions; Fort Worth Brahmas; SPHL; Huntsville Havoc
- NHL draft: Undrafted
- Playing career: 2001–2011

Vladimír Hartinger (born July 16, 1979 in Šternberk) is a Czech professional ice hockey player. He was formerly a member of the Huntsville Havoc in Huntsville, Alabama, and helped the team to win the Southern Professional Hockey League championship in 2009–10. Then later played in Rapid City, South Dakota for the Rapid City Rush in the Central Hockey League. Vladimir Hartinger has been involved with the sport of hockey from a young age. He played with the Czech National team as well as the Czech Army team as a young adult. Hartinger played professional hockey for the CHL, SPHL, and an international league from 2001 - 2011. Vladimir has been coaching youth hockey in New Mexico since leaving professional hockey. He is passionate about helping youth players develop not only as high level competitive players, but also as teammates and responsible young adults.

He also coaches youth ice hockey in New Mexico and Missouri.

== Career statistics ==
			Regular season					Playoffs
Season	Team	League	GP	G	A	Pts	PIM	GP	G	A	Pts	PIM
1996–97	HC Sternberk	Czech3	36	1	8	9	52	—	—	—	—	—
1997–98	HC Prostejov	Czech2	52	0	6	6	89	—	—	—	—	—
1997–98	HK Kromeriz	Czech3	—	—	—	—	—	—	—	—	—	—
1998–99	HC Kometa Brno	Czech2	39	2	9	11	82	—	—	—	—	—
1999–00	KLH Vajgar Jindřichův Hradec	Czech2	19	0	1	1	18	—	—	—	—	—
1999–00	HC Příbram	Czech3	15	7	3	10	30	—	—	—	—	—
2000–01	HC Kometa Brno	Czech2	42	1	5	6	77	—	—	—	—	—
2001–02	Wichita Thunder	CHL	56	4	23	27	110	—	—	—	—	—
2001–02	HC Kometa Brno	Czech2	6	0	0	0	8	—	—	—	—	—
2002–03	Wichita Thunder	CHL	41	10	12	22	111	—	—	—	—	—
2002–03	New Mexico Scorpions	CHL	13	3	5	8	4	4	0	2	2	4
2003–04	New Mexico Scorpions	CHL	64	12	23	35	94	—	—	—	—	—
2004–05	New Mexico Scorpions	CHL	54	3	12	15	75	—	—	—	—	—
2005–06	Fort Worth Brahmas	CHL	43	6	24	30	114	—	—	—	—	—
2006–07	New Mexico Scorpions	CHL	60	5	21	26	100	18	1	10	11	24
2007–08	New Mexico Scorpions	CHL	63	20	43	63	116	4	1	3	4	6
2008–09	WSV Sterzing Broncos	Italy2	43	12	49	61	112	7	1	9	10	—
2009–10	WSV Sterzing Broncos	Italy2	33	12	23	35	78	10	2	4	6	14
2009–10	Huntsville Havoc	SPHL	5	3	2	5	2	8	2	1	3	0
2010–11	Rapid City Rush	CHL	45	10	12	22	40	15	0	9	9	16
CHL totals			439	73	175	248	764	41	2	24	26	50

== Awards and honours ==
Award	Year
CHL Most Outstanding Defenceman	2007–08
All-CHL Team	2007–08
