= David Shute (ice hockey) =

American ice hockey left winger

- Born: February 10, 1971 (age 55) Richfield, Minnesota, U.S.
- Height: 6 ft 0 in (183 cm)
- Weight: 190 lb (86 kg; 13 st 8 lb)
- Position: Left wing
- Shot: Left
- Played for: Muskegon Lumberjacks; Knoxville Cherokees; Erie Panthers; Hampton Roads Admirals; Raleigh Icecaps
- NHL draft: 163rd overall, 1989; Pittsburgh Penguins
- Playing career: 1991–2003

David Shute (born February 10, 1971) is an American former professional ice hockey and roller hockey left winger.

Shute was drafted 163rd overall by the Pittsburgh Penguins in the 1989 NHL entry draft but never played in the National Hockey League. He played in the International Hockey League for the Muskegon Lumberjacks and the East Coast Hockey League for the Knoxville Cherokees, Erie Panthers, Hampton Roads Admirals and Raleigh Icecaps.

Shute also played five seasons in Roller Hockey International, playing for the Minnesota Arctic Blast, Minnesota Blue Ox and St. Louis Vipers.

== Career statistics ==
| | | | Regular season | | | | | Playoffs |
| Season | Team | League | GP | G | A | Pts | PIM | GP | G | A | Pts | PIM |
|---|---|---|---|---|---|---|---|---|---|---|---|---|
| 1988–89 | Victoria Cougars | WHL | 69 | 5 | 11 | 16 | 26 | 8 | 0 | 1 | 1 | 10 |
| 1989–90 | Victoria Cougars | WHL | 14 | 4 | 5 | 9 | 25 | — | — | — | — | — |
| 1989–90 | Medicine Hat Tigers | WHL | 48 | 13 | 15 | 28 | 56 | — | — | — | — | — |
| 1990–91 | Medicine Hat Tigers | WHL | 72 | 31 | 28 | 59 | 91 | 11 | 6 | 2 | 8 | 9 |
| 1991–92 | Muskegon Lumberjacks | IHL | 7 | 1 | 2 | 3 | 6 | — | — | — | — | — |
| 1991–92 | Knoxville Cherokees | ECHL | 57 | 18 | 35 | 53 | 91 | — | — | — | — | — |
| 1992–93 | Chatham Wheels | CoHL | 15 | 4 | 9 | 13 | 10 | — | — | — | — | — |
| 1992–93 | St. Paul Fighting Saints | AHA | 17 | 7 | 16 | 23 | 32 | — | — | — | — | — |
| 1993–94 | Erie Panthers | ECHL | 32 | 12 | 10 | 22 | 8 | — | — | — | — | — |
| 1993–94 | Hampton Roads Admirals | ECHL | 8 | 2 | 4 | 6 | 6 | 5 | 0 | 2 | 2 | 2 |
| 1993–94 | Raleigh IceCaps | ECHL | 27 | 10 | 13 | 23 | 21 | — | — | — | — | — |
| 1994–95 | San Antonio Iguanas | CHL | 53 | 22 | 32 | 54 | 68 | 13 | 11 | 5 | 16 | 12 |
| 1995–96 | San Antonio Iguanas | CHL | 17 | 7 | 6 | 13 | 41 | — | — | — | — | — |
| 1995–96 | Wichita Thunder | CHL | 46 | 42 | 27 | 69 | 42 | — | — | — | — | — |
| 1996–97 | Waco Wizards | WPHL | 5 | 3 | 0 | 3 | 2 | — | — | — | — | — |
| 1996–97 | Wichita Thunder | CHL | 16 | 8 | 2 | 10 | 29 | — | — | — | — | — |
| 1996–97 | Oklahoma City Blazers | CHL | 32 | 15 | 15 | 30 | 51 | — | — | — | — | — |
| 1997–98 | Lake Charles Ice Pirates | WPHL | 39 | 12 | 14 | 26 | 34 | — | — | — | — | — |
| 1997–98 | Odessa Jackalopes | WPHL | 1 | 1 | 1 | 2 | 0 | — | — | — | — | — |
| 1998–99 | Corpus Christi IceRays | WPHL | 69 | 22 | 26 | 48 | 79 | 4 | 1 | 2 | 3 | 8 |
| 1999–00 | Amarillo Rattlers | WPHL | 35 | 15 | 18 | 33 | 74 | — | — | — | — | — |
| 1999–00 | San Angelo Outlaws | WPHL | 18 | 9 | 10 | 19 | 12 | — | — | — | — | — |
| 2000–01 | El Paso Buzzards | WPHL | 60 | 28 | 24 | 52 | 70 | 7 | 0 | 0 | 0 | 11 |
| 2001–02 | ERC Ingolstadt | Germany2 | 2 | 0 | 0 | 0 | 6 | — | — | — | — | — |
| 2001–02 | ERSC Amberg | Germany4 | 28 | 23 | 25 | 48 | 126 | — | — | — | — | — |
| 2002–03 | ERSC Amberg | Germany3 | 17 | 7 | 12 | 19 | 89 | — | — | — | — | — |
| 2002–03 | Blue Devils Weiden | Germany3 | 19 | 5 | 7 | 12 | 46 | — | — | — | — | — |
| ECHL totals | | | 124 | 42 | 62 | 104 | 126 | 5 | 0 | 2 | 2 | 2 |
