= Gatis Tseplis =

Latvian ice hockey player

- Born: May 1, 1971 (age 53); Riga, Latvian SSR, Soviet Union
- Height: 6 ft 0 in (183 cm)
- Weight: 192 lb (87 kg; 13 st 10 lb)
- Position: Defence
- Shot: Left
- Played for: Stars Riga; Pārdaugava Riga; HC Kometa Brno; KooKoo; Huntsville Channel Cats; San Antonio Iguanas; Nashville Nighthawks; Detroit Vipers; Fort Worth Brahmas; Fort Worth Fire; Corpus Christi IceRays; New Mexico Scorpions; Knoxville Ice Bears
- National team: Latvia
- Playing career: 1987–2003

Gatis Tseplis (born May 1, 1971) is a Latvian former professional ice hockey defenceman.

== Career ==
Gatis Tseplis arrived to the United States from Riga, Latvia, after spending 12 years playing five seasons of professional hockey in Russia and the Czech Republic. From 1996 to 1997 he played for the Huntsville Channel Cats, the Nashville Nighthawks, and the San Antonio Iguanas. During the 1997 to 1998 season, Tseplis played under Bill McDonald and his Fort Worth Brahmas team, scoring 19 goals and 45 assists for 64 points and was ranked 3rd in the league amongst defenseman in scoring. Due to his scoring abilities, he played a two-game call-up against Detroit Vipers.

From 1998 to 1999 Tseplis played with the Fort Worth Fire and the San Antonio Iguanas and in total scored 21 goals and 51 assists for 72 points which ranked him 5th in defenseman scoring for the Central Hockey League.

He participated in a game against New Mexico Scorpions in 2001 which ended with 3-0 loss for Tulsa Oilers. During 2001-2002 season he netted 13 goals and contributed with 29 assists for 42 points in 63 games. By the end of the season he was awarded with the Rick Kozuback Award.

For the 2002-2003 season, Tseplis initially signed for the Lubbock Cotton Kings of the CHL but ultimately never played for the team. Instead, he spent the season playing for the Knoxville Ice Bears in the Atlantic Coast Hockey League, in what was his final season before retiring.

His memorabilia is in Texas Hockey Museum.

== Career statistics ==
			Regular season					Playoffs
Season	Team	League	GP	G	A	Pts	PIM	GP	G	A	Pts	PIM
1987–88	RASMS Riga	Soviet3	2	0	0	0	0	—	—	—	—	—
1988–89	RASMS-Energo Riga	Soviet3	3	0	0	0	2	—	—	—	—	—
1989–90	RASMS-Energo Riga	Soviet3	64	2	3	5	46	—	—	—	—	—
1991–92	Stars Riga	Soviet	—	—	—	—	—	—	—	—	—	—
1991–92	RASMS Riga	Soviet3	36	3	1	4	46	—	—	—	—	—
1992–93	Pardaugava Riga	Russia	32	3	0	3	30	2	0	0	0	0
1992–93	Pardaugava Riga-2	Latvia	13	6	8	14	25	—	—	—	—	—
1993–94	Pardaugava Riga	Russia	33	7	3	10	26	2	0	0	0	2
1994–95	Pardaugava Riga	Russia	36	0	0	0	28	—	—	—	—	—
1995–96	HC Kometa Brno	Czech	12	0	2	2	0	—	—	—	—	—
1995–96	KooKoo	I-Divisioona	2	0	0	0	2	—	—	—	—	—
1995–96	Alianse Riga	Latvia	—	—	—	—	—	—	—	—	—	—
1996–97	Huntsville Channel Cats	CHL	10	1	0	1	4	—	—	—	—	—
1996–97	San Antonio Iguanas	CHL	21	5	12	17	10	—	—	—	—	—
1996–97	Nashville Nighthawks	CHL	12	2	4	6	6	—	—	—	—	—
1997–98	Detroit Vipers	IHL	2	0	0	0	4	—	—	—	—	—
1997–98	Fort Worth Brahmas	WPHL	56	19	45	64	24	13	2	8	10	14
1998–99	Fort Worth Fire	CHL	52	16	37	53	26	—	—	—	—	—
1998–99	San Antonio Iguanas	CHL	18	5	14	19	18	8	4	5	9	4
1999–00	San Antonio Iguanas	CHL	17	2	10	12	16	—	—	—	—	—
1999–00	Fort Worth Brahmas	WPHL	44	17	28	45	38	—	—	—	—	—
2000–01	Corpus Christi IceRays	WPHL	30	8	14	22	26	—	—	—	—	—
2000–01	New Mexico Scorpions	WPHL	46	9	28	37	36	—	—	—	—	—
2001–02	New Mexico Scorpions	CHL	63	13	29	42	68	—	—	—	—	—
2002–03	Knoxville Ice Bears	ACHL	58	14	29	43	54	6	1	0	1	4
CHL totals			193	44	106	150	148	8	4	5	9	4
WPHL totals			176	53	115	168	124	13	2	8	10	14
