= 2000–01 WPHL season =

The 2000–01 Western Professional Hockey League season was the fifth and final season of the Western Professional Hockey League, a North American minor pro league. 14 teams participated in the regular season, and the Bossier-Shreveport Mudbugs were the league champions.

== Regular season ==
East Division	GP	W	L	OTL	GF	GA	Pts
Tupelo T-Rex	71	46	20	5	287	208	97
Bossier-Shreveport Mudbugs	71	45	21	5	265	172	95
Austin Ice Bats	71	42	22	7	247	188	91
Corpus Christi Ice Rays	70	38	28	4	227	247	80
Monroe Moccasins	70	34	27	9	220	241	77
Lake Charles Ice Pirates	70	29	36	5	224	276	63
Fort Worth Brahmas	70	20	44	6	202	282	46

West Division	GP	W	L	OTL	GF	GA	Pts
Odessa Jackalopes	71	40	22	9	252	206	89
Lubbock Cotton Kings	71	40	23	8	272	225	88
El Paso Buzzards	70	29	33	8	206	234	66
San Angelo Outlaws	70	27	35	8	227	286	62
Amarillo Rattlers	70	29	33	8	225	284	62
New Mexico Scorpions	71	44	23	4	274	254	58
Central Texas Stampede	38	14	19	5	108	133	33

== President's Cup-Playoffs ==
President's Cup-Quarterfinals
E1	Tupelo	4
E4	Corpus Christi	1
E2	Bossier-Shreveport	4
E3	Austin	0
W1	Odessa	4
W3	El Paso	3
W2	Lubbock	4
W4	San Angelo	0

President's Cup-Semifinals
E1	Tupelo	1
E2	Bossier-Shreveport	4
W1	Odessa	0
W2	Lubbock	4

President's Cup-Final
E2	Bossier-Shreveport	4
W2	Lubbock	1
