= Ray Miron President's Cup =

- Sport: Ice hockey
- Awarded for: Team that wins the playoffs of the Central Hockey League

History
- First award: 1993 (as The William "Bill" Levins Memorial Trophy)
- Final award: 2014 (as Ray Miron President's Cup)
- First winner: Tulsa Oilers
- Most wins: Wichita Thunder, Oklahoma City Blazers, Memphis River Kings, Laredo Bucks, Colorado Eagles, Allen Americans (2 titles)
- Most recent: Allen Americans (2nd title)

The Ray Miron President's Cup is a trophy that was awarded to the playoff champion of the Central Hockey League (CHL) from 2002 until 2014, when the remaining CHL teams joined the ECHL. The trophy was known as The William "Bill" Levins Memorial Cup from 1992 until 2000, when the honour was renamed the Ray Miron Cup. (Bill Levins and Ray Miron being the co-founders of the CHL). From 1997-2001, the WPHL's playoff champion was awarded the "President's Cup", so when the CHL and the Western Professional Hockey League merged following their 2000-01 seasons, the CHL combined the traditions of the two leagues by renaming the trophy the "Ray Miron President's Cup".

The "Playoff Most Valuable Player" award was also given out as part of the Ray Miron President's Cup Championship ceremonies. Ron Handy is the only player to win the award on multiple occasions.

14 different franchises won the CHL Championship, with six of them (Wichita, Oklahoma City, Memphis/Mississippi, Laredo, Colorado and Allen) winning twice. The five franchises hold the record for most championships won with two. Current possession of the trophy belongs to the Allen Americans, who won it in 2014 with a 4–1 victory over the Denver Cutthroats becoming only the third CHL team to win back-to-back championships.

== List of Central Hockey League Champions ==
The William "Bill" Levins Memorial Cup (1992–2000)
Season	Winning team	Score	Losing team	MVP
1992–93	Tulsa Oilers (1)	4–1	Oklahoma City Blazers	Tony Fiore
1993–94	Wichita Thunder (1)	4–0	Tulsa Oilers	Ron Handy
1994–95	Wichita Thunder (2)	4–2	San Antonio Iguanas	Ron Handy
1995–96	Oklahoma City Blazers (1)	4–3	San Antonio Iguanas	Jean-Ian Filiatrault
1996–97	Fort Worth Fire (1)	4–3	Memphis RiverKings	Steve Plouffe
1997–98	Columbus Cottonmouths (1)	4–0	Wichita Thunder	Mike Martens
1998–99	Huntsville Channel Cats (1)	4–2	Oklahoma City Blazers	Derek Puppa
1999–00	Indianapolis Ice (1)	4–3	Columbus Cottonmouths	Jamie Morris
Ray Miron Cup (2000–2001)
Season	Winning team	Score	Losing team	MVP
2000–01	Oklahoma City Blazers (2)	4–1	Columbus Cottonmouths	Rod Branch
Ray Miron President's Cup (2001–2014)
Season	Winning team	Score	Losing team	MVP
2001–02	Memphis RiverKings (1)	4–1	Austin Ice Bats	Don Parsons
2002–03	Memphis RiverKings (2)	4–1	Austin Ice Bats	Kahlil Thomas
2003–04	Laredo Bucks (1)	4–3	Bossier-Shreveport Mudbugs	David Guerrera
2004–05	Colorado Eagles (1)	4–1	Laredo Bucks	Chris Hartsburg
2005–06	Laredo Bucks (2)	4–1	Bossier-Shreveport Mudbugs	Jeff Bes
2006–07	Colorado Eagles (2)	4–2	Laredo Bucks	Greg Pankewicz
2007–08	Arizona Sundogs (1)	4–0	Colorado Eagles	Rob McVicar
2008–09	Texas Brahmas (1)	4-1	Colorado Eagles	Jason Deitsch
2009–10	Rapid City Rush (1)	4-3	Allen Americans	Les Reaney
2010–11	Bossier-Shreveport Mudbugs (1)	4-3	Colorado Eagles	Jeff Kyrzakos
2011–12	Fort Wayne Komets (1)	4-1	Wichita Thunder	Mike Vaskivuo
2012–13	Allen Americans (1)	4-3	Wichita Thunder	Brian McMillin
2013–14	Allen Americans (2)	4-1	Denver Cutthroats	Jamie Schaafsma
