= 2001–02 CHL season =

- League: Central Hockey League
- Sport: Ice hockey

Regular season
- Season MVP: Don Parsons (Memphis)
- MVP: Don Parsons (Memphis)

Finals
- Champions: Memphis RiverKings

CHL seasons
- 2000–01 2002–03

The 2001–02 CHL season was the tenth season of the Central Hockey League (CHL).

== Teams ==
2001-02 Central Hockey League
| Division | Team | City | Arena |
| Northeast | Bossier-Shreveport Mudbugs | Bossier City, Louisiana | CenturyTel Center |
| Northeast | Fort Worth Brahmas | Fort Worth, Texas | Fort Worth Convention Center |
| Northeast | Indianapolis Ice | Indianapolis, Indiana | Pepsi Coliseum |
| Northeast | Memphis RiverKings | Southaven, Mississippi | DeSoto Civic Center |
| Northwest | Amarillo Rattlers | Amarillo, Texas | Amarillo Civic Center |
| Northwest | Oklahoma City Blazers | Oklahoma City, Oklahoma | Myriad Convention Center |
| Northwest | Tulsa Oilers | Tulsa, Oklahoma | Tulsa Coliseum |
| Northwest | Wichita Thunder | Wichita, Kansas | Britt Brown Arena |
| Southeast | Austin Ice Bats | Austin, Texas | Luedecke Arena |
| Southeast | Corpus Christi IceRays | Corpus Christi, Texas | Memorial Coliseum |
| Southeast | San Angelo Outlaws | San Angelo, Texas | San Angelo Coliseum |
| Southeast | San Antonio Iguanas | San Antonio, Texas | Freeman Coliseum |
| Southwest | El Paso Buzzards | El Paso, Texas | El Paso County Coliseum |
| Southwest | Lubbock Cotton Kings | Lubbock, Texas | City Bank Coliseum |
| Southwest | New Mexico Scorpions | Albuquerque, New Mexico | Tingley Coliseum |
| Southwest | Odessa Jackalopes | Odessa, Texas | Ector County Coliseum |

== Map of teams ==
Northeast Division Northwest Division
Southeast Division Southwest Division

== Regular season ==
=== Division standings ===
| Northeast Division | GP | W | L | SOL | GF | GA | Pts |
|---|---|---|---|---|---|---|---|
| Memphis RiverKings | 64 | 46 | 14 | 4 | 267 | 186 | 92 |
| Bossier-Shreveport Mudbugs | 64 | 33 | 27 | 4 | 215 | 198 | 70 |
| Fort Worth Brahmas | 64 | 30 | 27 | 7 | 205 | 217 | 67 |
| Indianapolis Ice | 64 | 20 | 37 | 7 | 192 | 237 | 47 |

| Northwest Division | GP | W | L | SOL | GF | GA | Pts |
|---|---|---|---|---|---|---|---|
| Oklahoma City Blazers | 64 | 35 | 22 | 7 | 236 | 203 | 77 |
| Tulsa Oilers | 64 | 30 | 30 | 4 | 204 | 215 | 64 |
| Wichita Thunder | 64 | 24 | 34 | 6 | 203 | 262 | 54 |
| Amarillo Rattlers | 64 | 19 | 39 | 6 | 177 | 257 | 44 |

| Southeast Division | GP | W | L | SOL | GF | GA | Pts |
|---|---|---|---|---|---|---|---|
| Austin Ice Bats | 64 | 44 | 15 | 5 | 239 | 174 | 93 |
| San Antonio Iguanas | 64 | 40 | 16 | 8 | 243 | 183 | 88 |
| San Angelo Outlaws | 64 | 29 | 31 | 4 | 207 | 228 | 62 |
| Corpus Christi Ice Rays | 64 | 16 | 35 | 13 | 158 | 253 | 45 |

| Southwest Division | GP | W | L | SOL | GF | GA | Pts |
|---|---|---|---|---|---|---|---|
| Odessa Jackalopes | 64 | 47 | 11 | 6 | 203 | 149 | 100 |
| El Paso Buzzards | 64 | 36 | 24 | 4 | 223 | 222 | 76 |
| Lubbock Cotton Kings | 64 | 30 | 23 | 11 | 204 | 196 | 71 |
| New Mexico Scorpions | 64 | 33 | 25 | 6 | 210 | 206 | 70 |

Note: GP = Games played; W = Wins; L = Losses; SOL = Shootout loss; Pts = Points; GF = Goals for; GA = Goals against

y - clinched league title; x - clinched playoff spot; e - eliminated from playoff contention

== Playoffs ==
=== Playoff bracket ===
Quarter Finals
1 | Memphis | 3
4 | Fort Worth | 1
Northern
2 | Oklahoma City | 1
3 | Bossier-Shreveport | 3
1 | Odessa | 2
4 | El Paso | 3
Southern
2 | Austin | 3
3 | San Antonio | 1

Semi-Finals
1 | Memphis | 4
3 | Bossier-Shreveport | 3
4 | El Paso | 2
2 | Austin | 4

Championships
1 | Memphis | 4
2 | Austin | 1

== CHL awards ==
| Ray Miron President's Cup: | Memphis RiverKings |
| Governors' Cup: | Odessa Jackalopes |
| Most Valuable Player: | Don Parsons (Memphis) |
| Most Outstanding Goaltender: | Mike Gorman (Odessa) |
| Most Outstanding Defenseman: | Daniel Tetrault (Austin) |
| Rookie of the Year: | Sebastien Centomo (Memphis) |
| Coach of the Year: | Don McKee (Odessa) |
| Man of the Year: | Scott Hillman (Odessa) |
| Rick Kozuback Award: | Gatis Tseplis (New Mexico) |
| Scoring Champion: | Dan Price (Austin) |
| Playoff Most Valuable Player: | Don Parsons (Memphis) |
