= 1998–99 WPHL season =

The 1998–99 Western Professional Hockey League season was the third season of the Western Professional Hockey League, a North American minor pro league. 17 teams participated in the regular season, and the Shreveport Mudbugs were the league champions.

== Regular season ==
| WPHLC | GP | W | L | OTL | GF | GA | Pts |
|---|---|---|---|---|---|---|---|
| Waco Wizards | 69 | 40 | 22 | 7 | 275 | 232 | 87 |
| Corpus Christi Ice Rays | 69 | 40 | 23 | 6 | 253 | 210 | 86 |
| Central Texas Stampede | 69 | 33 | 24 | 12 | 286 | 266 | 78 |
| Fort Worth Brahmas | 69 | 34 | 26 | 9 | 227 | 235 | 77 |
| Austin Ice Bats | 69 | 26 | 33 | 10 | 211 | 287 | 54* |

| WPHLE | GP | W | L | OTL | GF | GA | Pts |
|---|---|---|---|---|---|---|---|
| Shreveport Mudbugs | 69 | 47 | 17 | 5 | 315 | 234 | 99 |
| Lake Charles Ice Pirates | 69 | 40 | 25 | 4 | 275 | 232 | 84 |
| Monroe Moccasins | 69 | 37 | 26 | 6 | 252 | 248 | 80 |
| Arkansas GlacierCats | 69 | 37 | 27 | 5 | 272 | 247 | 79 |
| Alexandria Warthogs | 69 | 25 | 30 | 14 | 264 | 310 | 64 |
| Tupelo T-Rex | 69 | 20 | 45 | 4 | 195 | 316 | 44 |

| WPHLW | GP | W | L | OTL | GF | GA | Pts |
|---|---|---|---|---|---|---|---|
| Abilene Aviators | 69 | 43 | 23 | 3 | 261 | 230 | 89 |
| San Angelo Outlaws | 69 | 39 | 25 | 5 | 284 | 253 | 83 |
| El Paso Buzzards | 69 | 36 | 27 | 6 | 246 | 231 | 78 |
| Odessa Jackalopes | 69 | 35 | 29 | 5 | 233 | 221 | 75 |
| Amarillo Rattlers | 69 | 31 | 30 | 8 | 246 | 271 | 70 |
| New Mexico Scorpions | 69 | 27 | 34 | 8 | 245 | 293 | 62 |

| Touring teams | GP | W | L | OTL | GF | GA | Pts |
|---|---|---|---|---|---|---|---|
| Kristall Elektrostal | 8 | 3 | 4 | 1 | 23 | 35 | 7 |
| HK Traktor Chelyabinsk | 9 | 2 | 6 | 1 | 26 | 38 | 5 |

== President's Cup-Playoffs ==
President's Cup-Pre-Playoffs
E1 | Shreveport Mudbugs
Bye
E3 | Monroe Moccasins | 2
E4 | Arkansas GlacierCats | 1
E2 | Lake Charles Ice Pirates | 2
C3 | Central Texas Stampede | 0
C2 | Corpus Christi Ice Rays
Bye
C1 | Waco Wizards
Bye
W2 | San Angelo Outlaws | 2
W4 | Odessa Jackalopes | 1
W1 | Abilene Aviators
Bye
W3 | El Paso Buzzards | 1
C4 | Fort Worth Brahmas | 2

President's Cup-Quarterfinals
E1 | Shreveport Mudbugs | 3
E3 | Monroe Moccasins | 0
E2 | Lake Charles Ice Pirates | 3
C2 | Corpus Christi Ice Rays | 1
C1 | Waco Wizards | 1
W2 | San Angelo Outlaws | 3
W1 | Abilene Aviators | 0
C4 | Fort Worth Brahmas | 3

President's Cup-Semifinals
E1 | Shreveport Mudbugs | 4
E2 | Lake Charles Ice Pirates | 1
W2 | San Angelo Outlaws | 4
C4 | Fort Worth Brahmas | 2

President's Cup-Final
E1 | Shreveport Mudbugs | 4
W2 | San Angelo Outlaws | 0
