= 1999–2000 WPHL season =

The 1999–00 Western Professional Hockey League season was the fourth season of the Western Professional Hockey League, a North American minor pro league. 18 teams participated in the regular season, and the Shreveport Mudbugs were the league champions.

== Regular season ==
| Central Division | GP | W | L | OTL | GF | GA | Pts |
|---|---|---|---|---|---|---|---|
| Central Texas Stampede | 70 | 50 | 17 | 3 | 282 | 187 | 103 |
| Austin Ice Bats | 71 | 42 | 23 | 6 | 279 | 245 | 90 |
| Corpus Christi Ice Rays | 71 | 36 | 26 | 9 | 306 | 302 | 81 |
| Fort Worth Brahmas | 70 | 28 | 38 | 4 | 238 | 287 | 60 |
| Waco Wizards | 27 | 11 | 14 | 2 | 86 | 107 | 24 |
| Abilene Aviators | 26 | 6 | 16 | 4 | 70 | 115 | 16 |

| Eastern Division | GP | W | L | OTL | GF | GA | Pts |
|---|---|---|---|---|---|---|---|
| Shreveport Mudbugs | 70 | 44 | 19 | 7 | 272 | 198 | 95 |
| Lake Charles Ice Pirates | 70 | 41 | 25 | 4 | 285 | 222 | 86 |
| Monroe Moccasins | 70 | 39 | 25 | 6 | 240 | 211 | 84 |
| Arkansas GlacierCats | 70 | 32 | 29 | 9 | 257 | 295 | 73 |
| Tupelo T-Rex | 70 | 31 | 28 | 11 | 241 | 281 | 73 |
| Alexandria Warthogs | 71 | 21 | 40 | 10 | 211 | 307 | 52 |

| Western Division | GP | W | L | OTL | GF | GA | Pts |
|---|---|---|---|---|---|---|---|
| New Mexico Scorpions | 70 | 49 | 18 | 3 | 261 | 230 | 101 |
| Lubbock Cotton Kings | 70 | 42 | 24 | 4 | 284 | 253 | 88 |
| El Paso Buzzards | 70 | 39 | 24 | 7 | 246 | 231 | 85 |
| Odessa Jackalopes | 70 | 30 | 32 | 8 | 233 | 221 | 68 |
| San Angelo Outlaws | 70 | 26 | 41 | 3 | 246 | 271 | 55 |
| Amarillo Rattlers | 70 | 21 | 41 | 8 | 245 | 293 | 50 |

== President's Cup-Playoffs ==
President's Cup-Pre-Playoffs
E1 | Shreveport Mudbugs
Bye
E2 | Lake Charles Ice Pirates | 2
E5 | Tupelo T-Rex | 1
C1 | Central Texas Stampede
Bye
E3 | Monroe Moccasins | 0
E4 | Arkansas GlacierCats | 2
W1 | New Mexico Scorpions
Bye
C3 | Corpus Christi Ice Rays | 2
W3 | El Paso Buzzards | 1
C2 | Austin Ice Bats
Bye
W2 | Lubbock Cotton Kings | 2
W4 | Odessa Jackalopes | 0

President's Cup-Quarterfinals
E1 | Shreveport Mudbugs | 3
E2 | Lake Charles Ice Pirates | 0
C1 | Central Texas Stampede | 3
E4 | Arkansas GlacierCats | 1
W1 | New Mexico Scorpions | 3
C3 | Corpus Christi Ice Rays | 1
C2 | Austin Ice Bats | 3
W2 | Lubbock Cotton Kings | 2

President's Cup-Semifinals
E1 | Shreveport Mudbugs | 4
C1 | Central Texas Stampede | 1
W1 | New Mexico Scorpions | 4
C2 | Austin Ice Bats | 1

President's Cup-Final
E1 | Shreveport Mudbugs | 4
W1 | New Mexico Scorpions | 2
