= 2001–02 Wichita Thunder season =

The 2001–02 Wichita Thunder season was the 10th season of the CHL franchise in Wichita, Kansas. The Thunder had a seven-game losing streak late in the season, and finished with a 24–34–6 record. During the final game of the season, defenseman Rob McCaig punched a fan in the face, resulting in his suspension by the Central Hockey League for all of 2002–2003.

== Regular season ==
=== Division standings ===
Northwest Division	GP	W	L	SOL	GF	GA	Pts
Oklahoma City Blazers	64	35	22	7	236	203	77
Tulsa Oilers	64	30	30	4	204	215	64
Wichita Thunder	64	24	34	6	203	262	54
Amarillo Rattlers	64	19	39	6	177	257	44

== See also ==
- 2001–02 CHL season
