= 2003–04 CHL season =

American ice hockey season

The 2003–04 CHL season was the 12th season of the Central Hockey League (CHL).

== Teams ==
2003-04 Central Hockey League
Division	Team	City	Arena
Northeast	Bossier-Shreveport Mudbugs	Bossier City, Louisiana	CenturyTel Center
Northeast	Fort Worth Brahmas	Fort Worth, Texas	Fort Worth Convention Center
Northeast	Indianapolis Ice	Indianapolis, Indiana	Pepsi Coliseum
Northeast	Memphis RiverKings	Southaven, Mississippi	DeSoto Civic Center
Northwest	Colorado Eagles	Loveland, Colorado	Budweiser Events Center
Northwest	New Mexico Scorpions	Albuquerque, New Mexico	Tingley Coliseum
Northwest	Oklahoma City Blazers	Oklahoma City, Oklahoma	Ford Center
Northwest	Tulsa Oilers	Tulsa, Oklahoma	Tulsa Coliseum
Northwest	Wichita Thunder	Wichita, Kansas	Britt Brown Arena
Southeast	Austin Ice Bats	Austin, Texas	Luedecke Arena
Southeast	Corpus Christi Rayz	Corpus Christi, Texas	Memorial Coliseum
Southeast	Laredo Bucks	Laredo, Texas	Laredo Entertainment Center
Southeast	Rio Grande Valley Killer Bees	Hidalgo, Texas	Dodge Arena
Southwest	Amarillo Gorillas	Amarillo, Texas	Amarillo Civic Center
Southwest	Lubbock Cotton Kings	Lubbock, Texas	City Bank Coliseum
Southwest	Odessa Jackalopes	Odessa, Texas	Ector County Coliseum
Southwest	San Angelo Saints	San Angelo, Texas	San Angelo Coliseum

== Map of teams ==
Northeast Division Northwest Division
Southeast Division Southwest Division

== Regular season ==
=== Division standings ===
Northeast Division	GP	W	L	OTL	SOL	GF	GA	Pts
Bossier-Shreveport Mudbugs	64	42	16	3	3	205	146	90
Indianapolis Ice	64	37	23	1	3	202	181	78
Memphis RiverKings	64	35	25	2	2	198	184	74
Fort Worth Brahmas	64	15	40	5	4	150	234	39

Northwest Division	GP	W	L	OTL	SOL	GF	GA	Pts
Colorado Eagles	64	43	16	0	5	232	156	91
Wichita Thunder	64	35	24	1	4	194	197	75
New Mexico Scorpions	64	32	27	2	3	200	208	69
Tulsa Oilers	64	26	25	4	9	194	210	65
Oklahoma City Blazers	64	29	28	2	5	176	194	65

Southeast Division	GP	W	L	OTL	SOL	GF	GA	Pts
Laredo Bucks	64	48	8	3	5	262	145	104
Rio Grande Valley Killer Bees	64	32	24	0	8	165	162	72
Austin Ice Bats	64	28	30	1	5	158	196	62
Corpus Christi Rayz	64	23	38	1	2	162	225	49

Southwest Division	GP	W	L	OTL	SOL	GF	GA	Pts
San Angelo Saints	64	37	19	5	3	197	169	82
Amarillo Gorillas	64	37	24	1	2	196	176	77
Odessa Jackalopes	64	26	35	2	1	168	205	55
Lubbock Cotton Kings	64	19	35	4	6	163	234	48

Note: GP = Games played; W = Wins; L = Losses; SOL = Shootout loss; Pts = Points; GF = Goals for; GA = Goals against

y - clinched league title; x - clinched playoff spot; e - eliminated from playoff contention

== Records ==
Tulsa Oilers goaltender Rod Branch posted eight shutouts during the 2003–04 season, to affirm his position as the CHL's all-time career shut-out leader with 22.
