= 2005–06 CHL season =

- League: Central Hockey League
- Sport: Ice hockey

Regular season
- CHL Governor's Cup: Colorado Eagles
- Season MVP: Derek Hahn (Amarillo)
- Top scorer: Derek Hahn (Amarillo)

Playoffs
- Northern champions: Bossier-Shreveport Mudbugs
- Southern champions: Laredo Bucks
- Playoffs MVP: Jeff Bes (Laredo)

Finals
- Champions: Laredo Bucks
- Runners-up: Bossier-Shreveport Mudbugs

CHL seasons
- 2004–05 2006–07

The 2005–06 CHL season was the 14th season of the Central Hockey League (CHL).

== Teams ==
2005-06 Central Hockey League
Division	Team	City	Arena
Northeast	Bossier-Shreveport Mudbugs	Bossier City, Louisiana	CenturyTel Center
Northeast	Fort Worth Brahmas	Fort Worth, Texas	Fort Worth Convention Center
Northeast	Memphis RiverKings	Southaven, Mississippi	DeSoto Civic Center
Northeast	Youngstown SteelHounds	Youngstown, Ohio	Covelli Center
Northwest	Colorado Eagles	Loveland, Colorado	Budweiser Events Center
Northwest	Oklahoma City Blazers	Oklahoma City, Oklahoma	Ford Center
Northwest	Tulsa Oilers	Tulsa, Oklahoma	Tulsa Coliseum
Northwest	Wichita Thunder	Wichita, Kansas	Britt Brown Arena
Southeast	Austin Ice Bats	Austin, Texas	Luedecke Arena; Chaparral Ice
Southeast	Corpus Christi Rayz	Corpus Christi, Texas	American Bank Center
Southeast	Laredo Bucks	Laredo, Texas	Laredo Entertainment Center
Southeast	Rio Grande Valley Killer Bees	Hidalgo, Texas	Dodge Arena
Southwest	Amarillo Gorillas	Amarillo, Texas	Amarillo Civic Center
Southwest	Lubbock Cotton Kings	Lubbock, Texas	City Bank Coliseum
Southwest	Odessa Jackalopes	Odessa, Texas	Ector County Coliseum

== Map of teams ==
Northeast Division Northwest Division
Southeast Division Southwest Division

== Regular season ==
=== Division standings ===
Northeast Division	GP	W	L	OTL	SOL	GF	GA	Pts
Bossier-Shreveport Mudbugs	64	41	15	1	7	223	170	90
Youngstown Steelhounds	64	24	35	2	3	208	235	53
Memphis RiverKings	64	22	37	4	1	207	254	49
Fort Worth Brahmas	64	17	39	7	1	156	244	42

Northwest Division	GP	W	L	OTL	SOL	GF	GA	Pts
Colorado Eagles	64	44	14	0	6	241	183	94
Wichita Thunder	64	38	18	4	4	233	200	84
Oklahoma City Blazers	64	35	24	3	2	233	215	75
Tulsa Oilers	64	29	28	4	3	209	227	65

Southeast Division	GP	W	L	OTL	SOL	GF	GA	Pts
Laredo Bucks	64	43	15	2	4	237	156	92
Rio Grande Valley Killer Bees	64	33	25	3	3	204	183	72
Austin Ice Bats	64	34	27	1	2	193	213	71
Corpus Christi Rayz	64	22	36	3	3	149	212	50

Southwest Division	GP	W	L	OTL	SOL	GF	GA	Pts
Odessa Jackalopes	64	36	22	3	3	217	197	78
Amarillo Gorillas	64	35	26	0	3	207	203	73
Lubbock Cotton Kings	64	27	31	1	5	179	204	60

Note: GP = Games played; W = Wins; L = Losses; SOL = Shootout loss; Pts = Points; GF = Goals for; GA = Goals against

y - clinched league title; x - clinched playoff spot; e - eliminated from playoff contention

== Playoffs ==
=== Playoff bracket ===
Conference Semi-Finals
N1	Colorado	4
N4	Oklahoma City	3
Northern
N2	Bossier-Shreveport	4
N3	Wichita	1
S1	Laredo	4
S4	Rio Grande Valley	2
Southern
S2	Odessa	4
S3	Amarillo	2

Conference Final
N1	Colorado	1
N2	Bossier-Shreveport	4
S1	Laredo	4
S2	Odessa	1

Ray Miron Presidents' Cup Finals
N2	Bossier-Shreveport	1
S1	Laredo	4
