= Don Parsons (ice hockey) =

American ice hockey player

- Born: January 17, 1969 (age 56) Boston, Massachusetts, U.S.
- Height: 5 ft 11 in (180 cm)
- Weight: 190 lb (86 kg; 13 st 8 lb)
- Position: Wing
- Shot: Right
- Played for: AHL; Worcester IceCats; St. John's Maple Leafs; CHL; Memphis Riverkings; ECHL; Nashville Knights; Tallahassee Tiger Sharks; Johnstown Chiefs; Baton Rouge Kingfish; Louisiana IceGators; IHL; Manitoba Moose; Cleveland Lumberjacks; NewIHL; Bloomington PrairieThunder; UHL; Flint Generals; Quad City Mallards
- NHL draft: Undrafted
- Playing career: 1991–2009

Don Parsons (born January 17, 1969) is an American former professional ice hockey player. Parsons is noted for being a prolific goal scorer who briefly held the modern minor league goal-scoring record from 2008 to 2010.

== Career ==
=== Early career and college ===
Parson started playing hockey as a defenseman for Archbishop Williams High School in Braintree, Massachusetts because of a lack of defensemen on the teams that he played on. Although he wanted to play forward, he continued to play defense as a member of the UMass Lowell hockey team from 1988 to 1992, where he scored 18 goals in 107 games.

=== Professional ===
In Parsons's rookie ECHL season, newly hired rookie Nashville head coach Nick Fotiu asked Parsons if he wanted to make the move from playing defense to playing forward. Parsons agreed, and scored 27 goals as a member of the Knights' third line. Parson signed with the Tallahassee Tiger Sharks for the 1994-95 season and scored 41 goals. The following season, he signed with the Johnstown Chiefs, reuniting him with former coach Fotiu and he had his first fifty-goal season, accomplishing the feat with a four-goal night on the final game of the season. Parsons would leave the Chiefs that season and sign with the Baton Rouge Kingfish. He was later traded to the Louisiana Ice Gators, where he would have his second fifty-goal season while in the ECHL.

Parsons signed with the Flint Generals of the United Hockey League. After one season with the Generals, Parsons signed with the Memphis Riverkings, where he stayed for six seasons.

On December 26, 2008 Parsons broke the modern minor hockey record for goals scored by registering his 678th goal against the Flint Generals. Parsons finished his career scoring 682 goals. His record was eclipsed by Robin Bouchard who scored his 683 career goal on March 20, 2010, against the Quad City Mallards of the IHL.

Parson was waived by the Bloomington PrairieThunder on January 6, 2009. Both management and Parsons announced that it was done for salary cap reasons.

== Retirement ==
Parsons's #13 was retired by the Memphis Riverkings in a pregame ceremony on March 14, 2010. He is the second such honoree in the team's history, joining the late Scott Brower.

== Coaching career ==
In mid-2011 Parsons was appointed head coach of the Lebanon Valley College team. The team finished the season 11-20 and reached the Eastern Collegiate Hockey Association playoffs for the first time.

== Personal ==
Parsons currently lives outside of Lancaster, PA and is married to his wife Kristen, and has three children: Abby, Maggy, and Maddox. They met while Parsons was a member of the Johnstown Chiefs.

== Career statistics ==
			Regular season					Playoffs
Season	Team	League	GP	G	A	Pts	PIM	GP	G	A	Pts	PIM
1988–89	University of Massachusetts Lowell	NCAA	18	2	1	3	14	—	—	—	—	—
1989–90	University of Massachusetts Lowell	NCAA	26	2	8	10	22	—	—	—	—	—
1990–91	University of Massachusetts Lowell	NCAA	31	7	16	23	35	—	—	—	—	—
1991–92	University of Massachusetts Lowell	NCAA	32	7	15	22	34	—	—	—	—	—
1991–92	Nashville Knights	ECHL	3	0	3	3	0	—	—	—	—	—
1992–93	Nashville Knights	ECHL	60	27	34	61	62	9	3	2	5	12
1994–95	Tallahassee Tiger Sharks	ECHL	66	41	36	77	82	13	5	10	15	12
1995–96	Johnstown Chiefs	ECHL	66	50	39	89	104	—	—	—	—	—
1996–97	Baton Rouge Kingfish	ECHL	19	13	14	27	8	—	—	—	—	—
1996–97	Worcester IceCats	AHL	2	1	1	2	4	—	—	—	—	—
1996–97	Louisiana IceGators	ECHL	49	28	21	49	94	17	7	9	16	54
1997–98	Louisiana IceGators	ECHL	70	55	45	100	112	8	1	10	11	8
1998–99	Louisiana IceGators	ECHL	44	34	29	63	44	4	0	1	1	4
1998–99	Manitoba Moose	IHL	2	0	0	0	0	—	—	—	—	—
1999–00	Flint Generals	UHL	60	46	57	103	104	15	10	6	16	18
1999–00	Cleveland Lumberjacks	IHL	1	0	0	0	2	—	—	—	—	—
2000–01	Memphis RiverKings	CHL	69	56	57	113	131	7	5	6	11	6
2001–02	Memphis RiverKings	CHL	59	54	41	95	49	16	14	13	27	24
2002–03	Memphis RiverKings	CHL	64	57	49	106	71	14	14	9	23	12
2003–04	Memphis RiverKings	CHL	63	39	41	80	55	—	—	—	—	—
2003–04	St. John's Maple Leafs	AHL	2	0	0	0	4	—	—	—	—	—
2004–05	Memphis RiverKings	CHL	60	55	38	93	46	—	—	—	—	—
2005–06	Memphis RiverKings	CHL	52	29	36	65	56	—	—	—	—	—
2006–07	Quad City Mallards	UHL	70	38	31	69	60	5	1	2	3	8
2007–08	Bloomington PrairieThunder	IHL	75	38	43	81	90	—	—	—	—	—
2008–09	Bloomington PrairieThunder	IHL	31	21	12	33	76	—	—	—	—	—
ECHL totals			377	248	221	469	506	51	16	32	48	90
CHL totals			367	290	262	552	408	37	33	28	61	42

== Awards ==
CHL

- 2000-01 Joe Burton Award (Scoring Champion)
- 2001-02 Most Valuable Player
- 2001-02 Most Valuable Player, Playoffs
- 2002-03 Most Valuable Player
- 2002-03 Joe Burton Award
- 2003-04 Man Of The Year
- 2004-05 All-CHL Team

== Records ==
ECHL

- Most consecutive 40+ goal seasons (4) - 1994-99 (Nashville, Tallahassee, Johnstown, Baton Rouge, Louisiana)
