= 2004–05 CHL season =

American ice hockey season

The 2004–05 CHL season was the 13th season of the Central Hockey League (CHL).

== Teams ==
2004-05 Central Hockey League
Division	Team	City	Arena
Northeast	Bossier-Shreveport Mudbugs	Bossier City, Louisiana	CenturyTel Center
Northeast	Fort Worth Brahmas	Fort Worth, Texas	Fort Worth Convention Center
Northeast	Memphis RiverKings	Southaven, Mississippi	DeSoto Civic Center
Northeast	Oklahoma City Blazers	Oklahoma City, Oklahoma	Ford Center
Northeast	Tulsa Oilers	Tulsa, Oklahoma	Tulsa Coliseum
Northwest	Colorado Eagles	Loveland, Colorado	Budweiser Events Center
Northwest	New Mexico Scorpions	Albuquerque, New Mexico	Tingley Coliseum
Northwest	Topeka Tarantulas	Topeka, Kansas	Landon Arena
Northwest	Wichita Thunder	Wichita, Kansas	Britt Brown Arena
Southeast	Austin Ice Bats	Austin, Texas	Luedecke Arena
Southeast	Corpus Christi Rayz	Corpus Christi, Texas	American Bank Center
Southeast	Laredo Bucks	Laredo, Texas	Laredo Entertainment Center
Southeast	Rio Grande Valley Killer Bees	Hidalgo, Texas	Dodge Arena
Southwest	Amarillo Gorillas	Amarillo, Texas	Amarillo Civic Center
Southwest	Lubbock Cotton Kings	Lubbock, Texas	City Bank Coliseum
Southwest	Odessa Jackalopes	Odessa, Texas	Ector County Coliseum
Southwest	San Angelo Saints	San Angelo, Texas	San Angelo Coliseum

== Map of teams ==
Northeast Division Northwest Division
Southeast Division Southwest Division

== Regular season ==
=== Division standings ===
Northeast Division	GP	W	L	OTL	SOL	GF	GA	Pts
Bossier-Shreveport Mudbugs	60	36	17	1	6	175	152	79
Tulsa Oilers	60	32	25	1	2	206	210	67
Oklahoma City Blazers	60	27	22	2	9	187	180	65
Memphis RiverKings	60	30	28	1	1	206	205	62
Fort Worth Brahmas	60	26	28	3	3	154	175	58

Northwest Division	GP	W	L	OTL	SOL	GF	GA	Pts
Colorado Eagles	60	43	10	5	2	221	123	93
Wichita Thunder	60	40	17	2	1	210	158	83
New Mexico Scorpions	60	27	27	1	5	185	210	60
Topeka Tarantulas	60	16	39	2	3	153	221	37

Southeast Division	GP	W	L	OTL	SOL	GF	GA	Pts
Laredo Bucks	60	35	22	1	2	196	148	73
Corpus Christi Rayz	60	28	25	2	5	182	196	63
Austin Ice Bats	60	28	27	1	4	192	216	61
Rio Grande Valley Killer Bees	60	19	38	1	2	149	221	41

Southwest Division	GP	W	L	OTL	SOL	GF	GA	Pts
Lubbock Cotton Kings	60	34	23	3	0	171	149	71
Amarillo Gorillas	60	31	20	6	3	169	172	71
San Angelo Saints	60	32	22	3	3	169	177	70
Odessa Jackalopes	60	26	22	6	6	158	170	64

Note: GP = Games played; W = Wins; L = Losses; SOL = Shootout loss; Pts = Points; GF = Goals for; GA = Goals against

y - clinched league title; x - clinched playoff spot; e - eliminated from playoff contention

== Playoffs ==
=== Playoff bracket ===
Conference Semi-Finals
N1	Colorado	4
N4	Tulsa	1
Northern
N2	Bossier-Shreveport	3
N3	Wichita	4
S1	Laredo	4
S4	San Angelo	3
Southern
S2	Lubbock	1
S3	Amarillo	4

Conference Final
N1	Colorado	4
N3	Wichita	2
S1	Laredo	4
S3	Amarillo	0

Ray Miron Presidents' Cup Finals
N1	Colorado	4
S1	Laredo	1

== CHL awards ==
Ray Miron President's Cup:	Colorado Eagles
Bud Poile Governors' Cup:	Colorado Eagles
Joe Burton Award (Scoring Champion):	Jason Duda (Wichita)
Playoff Most Valuable Player:	Chris Hartsburg (Colorado)

== See also ==
- 2005 Central Hockey League All-Star Game
