= 2002–03 CHL season =

American ice hockey season

The 2002–03 CHL season was the 11th season of the Central Hockey League (CHL).

== Teams ==
2002-03 Central Hockey League
Division	Team	City	Arena
Northeast	Bossier-Shreveport Mudbugs	Bossier City, Louisiana	CenturyTel Center
Northeast	Fort Worth Brahmas	Fort Worth, Texas	Fort Worth Convention Center
Northeast	Indianapolis Ice	Indianapolis, Indiana	Pepsi Coliseum
Northeast	Memphis RiverKings	Southaven, Mississippi	DeSoto Civic Center
Northwest	Amarillo Gorillas	Amarillo, Texas	Amarillo Civic Center
Northwest	Oklahoma City Blazers	Oklahoma City, Oklahoma	Ford Center
Northwest	Tulsa Oilers	Tulsa, Oklahoma	Tulsa Coliseum
Northwest	Wichita Thunder	Wichita, Kansas	Britt Brown Arena
Southeast	Austin Ice Bats	Austin, Texas	Luedecke Arena
Southeast	Corpus Christi IceRays	Corpus Christi, Texas	Memorial Coliseum
Southeast	Laredo Bucks	Laredo, Texas	Laredo Entertainment Center
Southeast	San Angelo Saints	San Angelo, Texas	San Angelo Coliseum
Southwest	El Paso Buzzards	El Paso, Texas	El Paso County Coliseum
Southwest	Lubbock Cotton Kings	Lubbock, Texas	City Bank Coliseum
Southwest	New Mexico Scorpions	Albuquerque, New Mexico	Tingley Coliseum
Southwest	Odessa Jackalopes	Odessa, Texas	Ector County Coliseum

== Map of teams ==
Northeast Division Northwest Division
Southeast Division Southwest Division

== Regular season ==
=== Division standings ===
Northeast Division	GP	W	L	OTL	SOL	GF	GA	Pts
Indianapolis Ice	64	39	16	1	8	206	173	87
Memphis RiverKings	64	39	21	1	3	235	190	82
Bossier-Shreveport Mudbugs	64	33	22	1	8	206	176	75
Fort Worth Brahmas	64	16	41	4	3	146	251	39

Northwest Division	GP	W	L	OTL	SOL	GF	GA	Pts
Oklahoma City Blazers	64	37	20	1	6	225	196	81
Amarillo Gorillas	64	39	23	2	0	205	176	80
Tulsa Oilers	64	37	22	3	2	218	195	79
Wichita Thunder	64	21	36	5	2	216	261	49

Southeast Division	GP	W	L	OTL	SOL	GF	GA	Pts
Austin Ice Bats	64	46	14	1	3	198	139	96
Laredo Bucks	64	41	17	0	6	253	184	88
Corpus Christi Ice Rays	64	31	30	1	2	197	204	65
San Angelo Saints	64	20	37	1	6	196	272	47

Southwest Division	GP	W	L	OTL	SOL	GF	GA	Pts
Odessa Jackalopes	64	35	22	5	2	195	185	77
New Mexico Scorpions	64	31	28	2	3	185	195	67
Lubbock Cotton Kings	64	29	28	2	5	212	215	65
El Paso Buzzards	64	18	40	3	3	184	265	42

Note: GP = Games played; W = Wins; L = Losses; SOL = Shootout loss; Pts = Points; GF = Goals for; GA = Goals against

y - clinched league title; x - clinched playoff spot; e - eliminated from playoff contention

== Playoffs ==
=== Playoff bracket ===
Quarter Finals
N1	Indianapolis	3
N4	Amarillo	1
Northern
N2	Memphis	3
N3	Oklahoma City	2
S1	Austin	3
S4	New Mexico	1
Southern
S2	Laredo	3
S3	Odesa	1

Semi-Finals
N1	Indianapolis	0
N2	Memphis	4
S1	Austin	4
S2	Laredo	2

Championships
N1	Memphis	4
S1	Austin	1
