= Corpus Christi IceRays (1998–2010) =

- City: Corpus Christi, Texas
- League: Central Hockey League; Western Professional Hockey League
- Conference: Southern Conference
- Division: Southeast Division
- Founded: 1998 (In the WPHL)
- Home arena: American Bank Center
- Colors: Red, black, gold

Franchise history
- 1998–2003: Corpus Christi Ice Rays
- 2003–2008: Corpus Christi Rayz
- 2008–2010: Corpus Christi IceRays

The Corpus Christi IceRays were a minor-league ice hockey team based in Corpus Christi, Texas affiliated with the Western Professional Hockey League from 1998–2001, and with the Central Hockey League from 2001 to 2010. The "IceRays" moniker derives from the many different species of stingrays who inhabit the nearby Gulf of Mexico.

== Team history ==
The team was established in 1998 as a member of the Western Professional Hockey League (WPHL) and played its home games at the (now demolished) Memorial Coliseum, dubbed "The Igloo" by fans because temperatures in the Coliseum dictated a dress that included sweaters and jackets, even in Corpus Christi's mild winters. The inaugural team was coached by former NHL veteran Taylor Hall. Ken McRae coached the team from 2004 to 2008, and broadcasts featured the talents and vocal stylings of Josh Bogorad, a formerly a small-time radio celebrity in the Los Angeles area.

The IceRays spent three seasons in the WPHL, amassing a 114–77–19 record with appearances in the WPHL playoffs in all three years under head coach Taylor Hall. In 2001, the WPHL merged its ten teams with the Central Hockey League (CHL), bolstering the league's presence in the Midwest.

Under new ownership, the IceRays rebranded to the “Corpus Christi Rayz” prior to the 2003–04 season after five seasons as a professional franchise, keeping the stingray as its mascot but altering the logo to incorporate the Texas state flag and colors. In 2004, the Rayz moved from the Memorial Coliseum to the new American Bank Center. The first event held at the arena was the Rayz first game on October 22, 2004, against the Austin Ice Bats to a sold out crowd of over 7,500 fans, one of just four sellouts in franchise history at the American Bank Center.

Immediately following the 2007–08 season, the Rayz briefly suspended operations while failing to find a suitable owner to take over the team. However, the franchise was purchased by Tim Lange later in the offseason and reactivated the franchise. The new ownership also brought back the IceRays name and a redesigned logo featuring red, gold, and black as its primary colors. After missing the playoffs in six of their seven seasons in the CHL, they returned to the playoffs during the next two seasons. They recorded a 58–56–2–12 record but exited the playoffs in the first round each time.

The team's head coach from 2008 to 2010 was former NHL player Brent Hughes. The franchise folded at the conclusion of the 2009–10 season when Lange decided to purchase a junior hockey team of the same name in the North American Hockey League.

In the 2011–12 hockey season, former player, Ryan Garbutt (a 2009–10 member), became the first former IceRays player to sign a National Hockey League (NHL) contract, inking a one-year deal with the Dallas Stars. On February 17, 2012, Garbutt was recalled by Dallas from the Texas Stars and played with the NHL club, marking the first player in franchise history to play in the NHL after having played in the CHL.

== Season-by-season record ==
Season records for the IceRays of the WPHL and the CHL.

| Season | League | GP | W | L | OTL | PTS | PCT | GF | GA | PIM | Atten. | Finish | Playoffs |
|---|---|---|---|---|---|---|---|---|---|---|---|---|---|
| 1998–99 | WPHL | 69 | 40 | 23 | 6 | 86 | 0.623 | 253 | 210 | 2242 | 3,301 | 2nd, Central | Lost Quarterfinals, 1–3 vs. Lake Charles Ice Pirates |
| 1999–00 | WPHL | 71 | 36 | 26 | 9 | 81 | 0.570 | 306 | 302 | 1766 | 3,704 | 3rd, Central | Won Qualifiers, 2–1 vs. El Paso Buzzards; Lost Quarterfinals, 1–3 vs. New Mexico Scorpions |
| 2000–01 | WPHL | 70 | 38 | 28 | 4 | 80 | 0.571 | 227 | 247 | 1732 | 3,598 | 4th, East | Lost Quarterfinals, 1–4 vs. Tupelo T-Rex |
| 2001–02 | CHL | 64 | 16 | 35 | 13 | 45 | 0.352 | 158 | 253 | 1895 | 3,567 | 3rd, Southeast | Did not qualify |
| 2002–03 | CHL | 64 | 31 | 30 | 3 | 65 | 0.508 | 197 | 204 | 1467 | 3,161 | 3rd, Southeast | Did not qualify |
| 2003–04 | CHL | 64 | 23 | 38 | 3 | 49 | 0.383 | 162 | 225 | 1583 | 2,990 | 4th, Southeast | Did not qualify |
| 2004–05 | CHL | 60 | 28 | 25 | 7 | 63 | 0.525 | 182 | 196 | 1125 | 4,147 | 2nd, Southeast | Did not qualify |
| 2005–06 | CHL | 64 | 22 | 36 | 6 | 50 | 0.391 | 149 | 212 | 1349 | 4,130 | 4th, Southeast | Did not qualify |
| 2006–07 | CHL | 64 | 35 | 22 | 7 | 77 | 0.602 | 196 | 169 | 1295 | 3,712 | 2nd, Southeast | Lost Round 1, 3–4 vs. Arizona Sundogs; Lost Round 2, 1–4 vs. Laredo Bucks |
| 2007–08 | CHL | 64 | 22 | 34 | 8 | 52 | 0.406 | 190 | 239 | 1244 | 3,763 | 3rd, Southeast | Did not qualify |
| 2008–09 | CHL | 64 | 28 | 30 | 6 | 62 | 0.484 | 183 | 206 | 1723 | 3,095 | 4th, Southeast | Lost Round 1, 1–2 vs. Rio Grande Valley Killer Bees |
| 2009–10 | CHL | 64 | 30 | 26 | 8 | 68 | 0.531 | 225 | 198 | 1328 | 3,104 | 5th, Southern | Lost Round 1, 0–2 vs. Texas Brahmas |
