= 1997–98 WPHL season =

The 1997–98 Western Professional Hockey League season was the second season of the Western Professional Hockey League, a North American minor pro league. 12 teams participated in the regular season, and the El Passo Buzzards were the league champions. Traktor Chelyabinsk, which was touring from Russia, played in 12 games.

== Regular season ==
Eastern Division	GP	W	L	OTL	GF	GA	Pts
Fort Worth Brahmas	69	41	17	11	296	219	93
Shreveport Mudbugs	69	42	20	7	308	228	91
Central Texas Stampede	69	40	23	6	258	251	86
Austin Ice Bats	69	35	23	11	247	255	81
Lake Charles Ice Pirates	69	35	28	6	273	280	76
Monroe Moccasins	69	35	2	2	225	223	72
Waco Wizards	69	18	48	3	203	319	39

Western Division	GP	W	L	OTL	GF	GA	Pts
El Paso Buzzards	69	43	20	6	338	252	92
New Mexico Scorpions	69	42	20	7	324	236	91
San Angelo Outlaws	69	29	34	6	280	326	64
Amarillo Rattlers	69	25	32	12	228	300	62
Odessa Jackalopes	69	26	37	6	262	360	58

	GP	W	L	OTL	GF	GA	Pts
Traktor Chelyabinsk	12	9	3	0	49	42	18

== President's Cup-Playoffs ==
President's Cup-Quarterfinals
W1	El Paso Buzzards	3
E5	Lake Charles Ice Pirates	1
W2	New Mexico Scorpions	3
W3	San Angelo Outlaws	0
E1	Fort Worth Brahmas	'3'
E4	Austin Ice Bats	2
E2	Shreveport Mudbugs	3
E3	Central Texas Stampede	1

President's Cup-Semifinals
W1	El Paso Buzzards	4
W2	New Mexico Scorpions	3
E1	Fort Worth Brahmas	4
E2	Shreveport Mudbugs	0

President's Cup-Final
W1	El Paso Buzzards	4
E1	Fort Worth Brahmas	0
