= 2006–07 CHL season =

- League: Central Hockey League
- Sport: Ice hockey

Regular season
- Governors’ Cup: Bossier-Shreveport
- Season MVP: Jeff Christian (Youngstown)
- Top scorer: Jeff Christian (Youngstown)

Playoffs

Finals
- Champions: Colorado Eagles

CHL seasons
- 2005–06 2007–08

The 2006–07 CHL season was the 15th season of the Central Hockey League (CHL).

== Teams ==
2006-07 Central Hockey League
Division	Team	City	Arena
Northeast	Bossier-Shreveport Mudbugs	Bossier City, Louisiana	CenturyTel Center
Northeast	Memphis RiverKings	Southaven, Mississippi	DeSoto Civic Center
Northeast	Tulsa Oilers	Tulsa, Oklahoma	Tulsa Coliseum
Northeast	Youngstown SteelHounds	Youngstown, Ohio	Covelli Center
Northwest	Colorado Eagles	Loveland, Colorado	Budweiser Events Center
Northwest	Oklahoma City Blazers	Oklahoma City, Oklahoma	Ford Center
Northwest	Rocky Mountain Rage	Broomfield, Colorado	Broomfield Event Center
Northwest	Wichita Thunder	Wichita, Kansas	Britt Brown Arena
Southeast	Austin Ice Bats	Austin, Texas	Chaparral Ice
Southeast	Corpus Christi Rayz	Corpus Christi, Texas	American Bank Center
Southeast	Laredo Bucks	Laredo, Texas	Laredo Entertainment Center
Southeast	Rio Grande Valley Killer Bees	Hidalgo, Texas	Dodge Arena
Southwest	Amarillo Gorillas	Amarillo, Texas	Amarillo Civic Center
Southwest	Arizona Sundogs	Prescott Valley, Arizona	Prescott Valley Convention & Events Center
Southwest	Lubbock Cotton Kings	Lubbock, Texas	City Bank Coliseum
Southwest	New Mexico Scorpions	Rio Rancho, New Mexico	Santa Ana Star Center
Southwest	Odessa Jackalopes	Odessa, Texas	Ector County Coliseum

== Map of teams ==
Northeast Division Northwest Division
Southeast Division Southwest Division

== Regular season ==
=== Division standings ===
Northeast Division	GP	W	L	OTL	SOL	GF	GA	Pts
Bossier-Shreveport Mudbugs	64	44	14	2	4	214	155	94
Memphis RiverKings	64	39	19	3	3	227	208	84
Youngstown Steelhounds	64	34	20	2	8	230	199	78
Tulsa Oilers	64	27	28	6	3	225	246	63

Northwest Division	GP	W	L	OTL	SOL	GF	GA	Pts
Colorado Eagles	64	46	17	0	1	256	182	93
Oklahoma City Blazers	64	35	21	2	6	211	214	78
Wichita Thunder	64	28	28	0	8	191	213	64
Rocky Mountain Rage	64	17	40	4	3	180	251	41

Southeast Division	GP	W	L	OTL	SOL	GF	GA	Pts
Laredo Bucks	64	42	17	3	2	219	170	89
Corpus Christi Rayz	64	35	22	4	3	196	169	77
Rio Grande Valley Killer Bees	64	28	28	4	4	185	203	64
Austin Ice Bats	64	21	29	5	9	169	210	56

Southwest Division	GP	W	L	OTL	SOL	GF	GA	Pts
New Mexico Scorpions	64	32	24	3	5	212	217	72
Arizona Sundogs	64	34	28	1	1	229	216	70
Amarillo Gorillas	64	32	28	1	3	205	220	68
Odessa Jackalopes	64	26	31	4	3	176	205	59
Lubbock Cotton Kings	64	24	31	2	7	170	217	57

Note: GP = Games played; W = Wins; L = Losses; SOL = Shootout loss; Pts = Points; GF = Goals for; GA = Goals against

y - clinched league title; x - clinched playoff spot; e - eliminated from playoff contention

== Playoffs ==
=== Format ===
The top six teams in each conference qualified for the playoffs. All series were best-of-seven. The highest seeded first round losing team advanced to the second round as a wild card team.

=== Playoff bracket ===
Conference Quarterfinals	Conference Semi-finals
N1	Bossier-Shreveport	4
N6	Wichita	2
N1	Bossier-Shreveport	1
N4	Memphis	4
-	-	-
N4	Memphis	-
Northern
N2	Colorado	4
N5	Youngstown	2
N2	Colorado	4
N3	Oklahoma City	3
N3	Memphis	3
N4	Oklahoma City	4
S1	Laredo	4
S6	Rio Grande Valley	1
S1	Laredo	4
S4	Corpus Christi	1
-	-	-
S4	Corpus Christi	-
S2	New Mexico	4
S5	Amarillo	2
S2	New Mexico	4
S3	Arizona	3
S3	Corpus Christi	3
S4	Arizona	4

Conference Final
N2	Colorado	4
N4	Memphis	2
S1	Laredo	4
S2	New Mexico	1

Ray Miron Presidents' Cup Finals
N2	Colorado	4
S1	Laredo	2

== Awards ==
Source:Central Hockey League Historical Award Winners

- Ray Miron President’s Cup (Playoff Champions) - Colorado Eagles
- Governors’ Cup (regular-season champions) - Bossier-Shreveport Mudbugs
- Most Valuable Player - Jeff Christian, Youngstown
- Most Outstanding Goaltender - John DeCaro, Bossier-Shreveport
- Most Outstanding Defenseman - Brad Williamson, Colorado
- Rookie of the Year - Cam Abbott, Bossier-Shreveport
- Coach of the Year - Kevin McClelland, Memphis
- Man of the Year - Riley Nelson, Colorado
- Rick Kozuback Award - Marco Pietroniro, Arizona
- Joe Burton Award (Scoring Champion) - Jeff Christian, Youngstown
- Playoff Most Valuable Player - Greg Pankewicz, Colorado
- All-Star Game Most Valuable Player (North) - Matt Medley, Tulsa
- All-Star Game Most Valuable Player (South) - Brent Zelenewich, Corpus Christi
- Athletic Trainer of the Year – Mike Ermatinger, Youngstown
- Equipment Manager of the Year– Brandon Rose, Oklahoma City

=== All-CHL Team ===
- Forward: Jeff Christian, Youngstown
- Forward: Brent Kelly, Arizona
- Forward: Chris Richards, Youngstown
- Defenseman: Derek Landmesser, Memphis
- Defenseman: Brad Williamson, Colorado
- Goaltender : John DeCaro, Bossier-Shreveport

=== All-Rookie Team ===
- Forward - Cam Abbott, Bossier-Shreveport
- Forward - Bobby Chaumont, Laredo
- Forward - Ryan McLeod, New Mexico
- Defenseman - Alex Dunn, Odessa
- Defenseman - Craig Strain, Colorado
- Goaltender - John DeCaro, Bossier-Shreveport
