= 2008–09 CHL season =

- League: Central Hockey League
- Sport: Ice hockey

Regular season
- Governors’ Cup: Colorado Eagles
- Season MVP: Sébastien Thinel (Odessa)
- Top scorer: Sébastien Thinel (Odessa)

Playoffs
- Northern champions: Colorado Eagles
- Northern runners-up: Mississippi RiverKings
- Southern champions: Texas Brahmas
- Southern runners-up: Odessa Jackalopes
- Playoffs MVP: Jason Deitsch (Texas)

Finals
- Champions: Texas Brahmas
- Runners-up: Colorado Eagles

CHL seasons
- 2007–08 2009–10

The 2008–09 CHL season was the 17th season of the Central Hockey League (CHL).

== League business ==
The Rapid City Rush were added and two teams were ceased, the Austin Ice Bats and Youngstown SteelHounds.

== Teams ==
2008-09 Central Hockey League
Conference	Team	City	Arena
Northern	Bossier-Shreveport Mudbugs	Bossier City, Louisiana	CenturyTel Center
Northern	Colorado Eagles	Loveland, Colorado	Budweiser Events Center
Northern	Mississippi RiverKings	Southaven, Mississippi	DeSoto Civic Center
Northern	Oklahoma City Blazers	Oklahoma City, Oklahoma	Ford Center
Northern	Rapid City Rush	Rapid City, South Dakota	Rushmore Plaza Civic Center
Northern	Rocky Mountain Rage	Broomfield, Colorado	Broomfield Event Center
Northern	Tulsa Oilers	Tulsa, Oklahoma	BOK Center
Northern	Wichita Thunder	Wichita, Kansas	Britt Brown Arena
Southern	Amarillo Gorillas	Amarillo, Texas	Amarillo Civic Center
Southern	Arizona Sundogs	Prescott Valley, Arizona	Tim's Toyota Center
Southern	Corpus Christi IceRays	Corpus Christi, Texas	American Bank Center
Southern	Laredo Bucks	Laredo, Texas	Laredo Entertainment Center
Southern	New Mexico Scorpions	Rio Rancho, New Mexico	Santa Ana Star Center
Southern	Odessa Jackalopes	Odessa, Texas	Ector County Coliseum
Southern	Rio Grande Valley Killer Bees	Hidalgo, Texas	Dodge Arena
Southern	Texas Brahmas	North Richland Hills, Texas	NYTEX Sports Centre

== Map of teams ==
Northern Conference Southern Conference

== Regular season ==
=== Conference standings ===
Northern Conference	GP	W	L	OTL	Pts	GF	GA
y-Colorado Eagles	64	45	15	4	94	275	195
x-Mississippi RiverKings	64	44	17	3	91	242	166
x-Oklahoma City Blazers	64	39	18	7	85	202	158
x-Bossier-Shreveport Mudbugs	64	39	19	6	84	196	169
x-Rocky Mountain Rage	64	32	26	6	70	220	219
e-Rapid City Rush	64	22	33	9	53	183	231
e-Tulsa Oilers	64	18	38	8	44	179	270
e-Wichita Thunder	64	20	41	3	43	168	230

Southern Conference	GP	W	L	OTL	Pts	GF	GA
y-Texas Brahmas	64	42	16	6	90	223	170
x-Odessa Jackalopes	64	39	19	6	84	260	205
x-Laredo Bucks	64	36	23	5	77	214	187
x-Rio Grande Valley Killer Bees	64	35	24	5	73	221	198
x-Corpus Christi IceRays	64	28	30	6	62	183	206
e-Arizona Sundogs	64	27	32	5	59	220	259
e-New Mexico Scorpions	64	27	33	4	58	220	242
e-Amarillo Gorillas	64	19	42	3	41	193	294

Note: y - clinched conference title; x - clinched playoff spot; e - eliminated from playoff contention

== Playoffs ==
=== Playoff Bracket ===
First Round 1
N4	Bossier-Shreveport	3
N5	Rocky Mountain	1
S4	Rio Grande Valley	2
S5	Corpus Christi	1

Conference Semi-finals
N1	Colorado	4
N4	Bossier-Shreveport	0
Northern
N2	Mississippi	4
N3	Oklahoma City	2
S2	Odessa	4
S3	Laredo	2
Southern
S1	Texas	4
S4	Rio Grande valley	0

Conference Finals
N1	Colorado	4
N2	Mississippi	2
S1	Texas	4
S2	Odessa	3

Ray Miron President's Cup Finals
N1	Colorado	1
S1	Texas	4

== CHL awards ==
Source:Central Hockey League Historical Award Winners

Ray Miron President's Cup:	Texas Brahmas
Governors' Cup:	Colorado Eagles
Most Valuable Player:	Sébastien Thinel (Odessa)
Most Outstanding Goaltender:	Kevin Beech (Mississippi)
Most Outstanding Defenseman:	Aaron Schneekloth (Colorado)
Rookie of the Year:	Darryl Smith (Laredo)
Coach of the Year:	Kevin Kaminski (Mississippi)
Man of the Year:	Austin Sutter (Amarillo)
Rick Kozuback Award:	Jeff Lund (Tulsa)
Joe Burton Award:	Sébastien Thinel (Odessa)
Playoff Most Valuable Player	Jason Deitsch (Texas)
All-Star Game MVP (Eagles):	Konrad Reeder (Colorado)
All-Star Game MVP (CHL All-Stars):	Darryl Smith (Laredo)
Athletic Trainer of the Year:	Osama Kassab (Rocky Mountain)
Equipment Manager of the Year:	Shawn Smith (Rapid City)
