= Bossier-Shreveport Mudbugs =

- City: Bossier City, Louisiana
- League: Central Hockey League (2001–2011); Western Professional Hockey League (1997–2001)
- Conference: Berry
- Founded: 1997
- Home arena: CenturyTel Center
- Colors: Black, teal, purple, red, white
- Owners: Tommy & Leslie Scott
- General manager: Jason Campbell
- Head coach: Scott Muscutt

Franchise history
- 1997–2000: Shreveport Mudbugs
- 2000–2011: Bossier-Shreveport Mudbugs

Championships
- Regular season titles: 3 (1999, 2007, 2008)
- Division titles: 7 (1999, 2000, 2004, 2005, 2006, 2007, 2008)
- Conference titles: 3 (2004, 2006, 2011)
- Ray Miron President's Cup: 4 (1999, 2000, 2001,2011)

The Bossier-Shreveport Mudbugs were a professional ice hockey team which played in the Bossier City-Shreveport metropolitan area of Louisiana. From 1997 to 2001, the Bossier-Shreveport Mudbugs were members of the Western Professional Hockey League, until a 2001 merger between the WPHL with the Central Hockey League. From 2001 to 2011, the Bossier-Shreveport Mudbugs played in the Central Hockey League. From 1997 until 2000, they were known as the Shreveport Mudbugs, changing the name to the Bossier-Shreveport Mudbugs after the team relocated from the Hirsch Coliseum in Shreveport to the CenturyTel Center in Bossier City.

One of the few successful sports teams from the Bossier-Shreveport area, the Mudbugs found success early. Coached by former Mudbug player Scott Muscutt and owned by Tommy and Leslie Scott, the team increased attendance each year and hosted the All-Star festivities for the Central Hockey League in 2007. The Mudbugs maintained heated rivalries with the Texas Brahmas, Laredo Bucks, Mississippi RiverKings, and Colorado Eagles.

== History ==
In their first four seasons, the Mudbugs saw their most success. After the sweep from the Fort Worth Brahmas in the second round of their opening season, the Mudbugs went on to win the President's Cup Championships three straight years in the WPHL. Following the merger of the WPHL and CHL, the Mudbugs found their way back to the Ray Miron President's Cup Finals three times (2004, 2006, 2011). The Mudbugs were the only team in history of the WPHL and CHL to ever win the Cup three straight years.

During the 2009–10 season, Mudbugs legend goaltender Ken Carroll and Travis Clayton were named to the Central Hockey League's All Decade Team.

On July 20, 2010 former player Jason Campbell was named the new Vice President & General Manager for the Mudbugs.

With the merger of the CHL and the IHL beginning with the 2010–11 season, the Mudbugs played in the Berry Conference. The Mudbugs would go on to win the Ray Miron President's Cup that season in a seven-game series with the Colorado Eagles, but would cease operations two weeks later citing low attendance and financial issues.

In October 2015, it was announced that a new Mudbugs team would return for the 2016–17 season after signing a 12-year lease agreement with the Louisiana State Fairgrounds to play their home games in the Hirsch Coliseum as a member of the Tier II junior North American Hockey League. On April 8, 2016, the Shreveport Mudbugs were officially announced as an expansion team in the NAHL.

== Season-by-season results ==
Regular Season										Playoffs			
Season	Games	Won	Lost	OTL	SOL	Goals for	Goals against	Points	Standing	1st round	2nd round	3rd round	Finals
1997–98	69	42	20	7	—	308	228	91	2nd of 7, East Div. 3rd of 12, WPHL	—	W, 3-1; Central Texas Stampede	L, 0-4; Fort Worth Brahmas	
1998–99	69	47	17	5	—	315	234	99	1st of 6, East Div. 1st of 17, WPHL	BYE	W, 3-0; Monroe Moccasins	W, 4-1; Lake Charles Ice Pirates	W, 4-0; San Angelo Outlaws
1999–00	70	44	19	7	—	272	198	95	1st of 6, Eastern Div. 3rd of 18, WPHL	BYE	W, 3-0; Lake Charles Ice Pirates	W, 4-1; Central Texas Stampede	W, 4-2; New Mexico Scorpions
2000–01	71	45	21	5	—	265	172	95	2nd of 7, East Div. 2nd of 14, WPHL	—	W, 4-0; Austin Ice Bats	W, 4-1; Tupelo T-Rex	W, 4-1; Lubbock Cotton Kings
2001–02	64	33	27	—	4	215	198	70	2nd of 4, Northeast Div. 8th of 16, CHL	—	W, 3-1; Oklahoma City Blazers	L, 3-4; Memphis RiverKings	
2002–03	64	33	22	1	8	206	176	75	3rd of 4, Northeast Div. 10th of 16, CHL	Did not qualify			
2003–04	64	42	16	3	3	205	146	90	1st of 4, Northeast Div. 3rd of 17, CHL	—	W, 3-2; Indianapolis Ice	W, 4-1; Wichita Thunder	L, 3-4; Laredo Bucks
2004–05	60	36	17	1	6	175	152	79	1st of 5, Northeast Div. 3rd of 18, CHL	—	L, 3-4; Wichita Thunder		
2005–06	64	41	15	1	7	223	170	90	1st of 4, Northeast Div. 3rd of 15, CHL	—	W, 4-1; Wichita Thunder	W, 4-1; Colorado Eagles	L, 1-4; Laredo Bucks
2006–07	64	44	14	2	4	214	155	94	1st of 4, Northeast Div. 1st of 17, CHL	W, 4-2; Wichita Thunder	L, 1-4; Memphis RiverKings		
2007–08	64	44	14	3	3	214	122	94	1st of 5, Northeast Div. 1st of 17, CHL	BYE	L, 0-4; Texas Brahmas		
2008–09	64	39	19	1	5	196	169	84	3rd of 4, Northeast Div. 5th of 16, CHL	W, 2-1; Rocky Mountain Rage	L, 0-4; Colorado Eagles		
2009–10	64	38	22	2	2	213	180	80	3rd of 7, Northern Conf. 5th of 15, CHL	BYE	W, 4-0; Colorado Eagles	L, 3-4; Rapid City Rush	
2010–11	66	37	26	2	1	229	193	77	2nd of 9, Berry Conf. 6th of 18, CHL	W, 3-1; Arizona Sundogs	W, 3-2; Tulsa Oilers	W, 4-1; Allen Americans	W, 4-3; Colorado Eagles

== WPHL & CHL team awards and trophies ==
Ray Miron President's Cup Champions

- 1998–1999
- 1999–2000
- 2000–2001
- 2010-2011

Governor's Cup Champions

- 1998–1999
- 2006–2007
- 2007–2008

Central Hockey League Northern Conference Champions

- 2003–2004
- 2005–2006

Division Championships

- WPHL Eastern Division 1998–1999
- WPHL Eastern Division 1999–2000
- CHL Northeastern Division 2003–2004
- CHL Northeastern Division 2004–2005
- CHL Northeastern Division 2005–2006
- CHL Northeastern Division 2006–2007
- CHL Northeastern Division 2007–2008

Central Hockey League Franchise of the Year

- 2005–2006

10th Anniversary Logo (2007).

Bossier-Shreveport hosted the 2007 CHL All-Star Game.

== WPHL & CHL player awards and trophies ==
Central Hockey League Coach of the Year

- Scott Muscutt: 2007-08

Central Hockey League Rookie of the Year

- Cam Abbott: 2006-07

Central Hockey League Most Outstanding Goaltender

- Ken Carroll: 2005-06
- John DeCaro: 2006-07, 2007–08

Western Professional Hockey League Rookie of the Year

- Ken Carroll: 2000-01

Western Professional Hockey League Playoff Most Valuable Player

- John Vecchiarelli: 1998-99
- Hugo Hamelin: 1999-00
- Jason Campbell: 2000-01

Western Professional Hockey League Man of the Year

- Scott Muscutt: 1999-00

Western Professional Hockey League Most Outstanding Goaltender

- Kevin St.Pierre: 1997-98
- Ken Carroll: 2000-01

== Franchise individual records ==
- Most Saves in a single game: Ken Carroll, 57 (March 19, 2007)
- Most Goals in a season: Paul Jackson, 55 (1997–98)
- Most Assists in a season: Brian Shantz, 82 (1997–98)
- Most Points in a season: Paul Jackson, 115 (1997–98)
- Most Penalty Minutes in a season: Dan Wildfong, 340 (2001–02)
- Most Wins in a season: Kevin St. Pierre, 36 (1997–98)
- Most Shutouts in a season: John DeCaro, 10 (2007–08)
- Most Goals in a career: Dan Wildfong, 213 (1999–2007)
- Most Assists in a career: Dan Wildfong, 339 (1999–2007)
- Most Points in a career: Dan Wildfong, 552 (1999–2007)
- Most Penalty Minutes in a career: Dan Wildfong, 2234 (1999–2007)
- Most Win in a career: Ken Carroll, 187 (2000-01 & 2002–2010)
- Most Shutouts in a career: Ken Carroll, 31 (2000-01 & 2002–2010)

== Franchise records ==
- Most Goals in a season: 315 (1998–99)
- Fewest Goals Against in a season: 146 (2003–04)
- Most Points in a season: 99 (1998–99)
- Most Penalty Minutes in a season: 1,988 (1997–98)
- Most Wins in a season: 47 (1998–99)
- Fewest Losses in a season: 14 (2006–07)
- Consecutive victories: 15 (12/08/2007-1/20/2008)
- Consecutive victories on home ice: 17 (12/08/2007-Current)
- All Time Regular Season Wins: 439
- All Time Regular Season Losses: 195
- All Time Regular Seasons Overtime Losses: 68
- All Time Wins: 506
- All Time Losses: 229
- Games Played: 803
