= 1995–96 Wichita Thunder season =

1995–96 Wichita Thunder
- League: 6th CHL
- 1995–96 record: 22-39-3
- Goals for: 270
- Goals against: 380

Team information
- General manager: Bill Shuck
- Coach: Don Jackson
- Arena: Britt Brown Arena
- Average attendance: 4710

Team leaders
- Goals: David Shute (42)
- Assists: Mikhail Kravets (57)
- Points: Mikhail Kravets (71)
- Penalty minutes: Bryan Wells (407)
- Wins: Paul Krake (7)

The 1995–96 Wichita Thunder season was the fourth season of the CHL franchise in Wichita, Kansas. It was Don Jackson's first season as coach. The Thunder finished the season at the bottom of the league, with a 22–39–3 record.

== Regular season ==
=== League standings ===
Central Hockey League	GP	W	L	SOL	GF	GA	Pts
y-Oklahoma City Blazers	64	47	13	4	327	224	98
x-San Antonio Iguanas	64	39	17	8	313	240	86
x-Memphis RiverKings	64	34	24	6	308	271	74
x-Tulsa Oilers	64	26	33	5	244	302	57
e-Fort Worth Fire	64	24	34	6	244	289	54
e-Wichita Thunder	64	22	39	3	270	380	47

Note: y - clinched league title; x - clinched playoff spot; e - eliminated from playoff contention

== See also ==
- 1995–96 CHL season
