= Colorado Eagles =

American Hockey League team in Loveland, Colorado

- City: Loveland, Colorado
- League: American Hockey League
- Conference: Western
- Division: Pacific
- Founded: 2003 (CHL)
- Home arena: Blue Arena
- Colors
- Owners: Colorado Eagles Professional Hockey LLC; Martin Lind
- General manager: Kevin McDonald
- Head coach: Jussi Ahokas
- Captain: Jayson Megna
- Media: The Coloradoan; Loveland Reporter-Herald; AHL.TV (Internet)
- Affiliates: Colorado Avalanche (NHL); New Mexico Goatheads (ECHL)

Franchise history
- 2003–present: Colorado Eagles

Championships
- Regular season titles: 3 (2005, 2006, 2009)
- Division titles: 9 (2004, 2005, 2006, 2007, 2008, 2009, 2016, 2018, 2025)
- Conference titles: 7 (2005, 2007, 2008, 2009, 2011, 2017, 2018)
- Ray Miron President's Cup: 2 (2005, 2007)
- Kelly Cups: 2 (2017, 2018)

The Colorado Eagles are a professional ice hockey team based in Loveland, Colorado. The Eagles play in the Pacific Division of the American Hockey League.

The Eagles were founded as an expansion franchise in 2003 in the Central Hockey League and remained in the league until June 2011, when they joined the ECHL. During their time in the CHL, the Eagles won two Ray Miron President's Cups, three regular season titles, five conference titles and six division titles in eight seasons. The team was granted membership as an expansion team in the American Hockey League beginning with the 2018–19 season as the affiliate of the Colorado Avalanche of the National Hockey League.

The Eagles play at the Blue Arena in Loveland and serve the Fort Collins – Loveland Metropolitan Statistical Area.

== Franchise history ==
=== Central Hockey League era (2003–2011) ===
The franchise was founded in 2003 by former Montreal Canadiens player Ralph Backstrom. The Eagles played their first ever game on October 11, 2003 in a preseason game against the Oklahoma City Blazers, where they would win 3-1 with Eagles forward Ryan Tobler scoring the first goal in Eagles history 8:09 into the first period. The first regular season game was played on October 17, 2003 against the Tulsa Oilers where they would lose 2-3. The Eagles advanced to the playoffs in their first season and won the CHL championship in their second season in 2004–05. They won their division in 2005–06, but lost in the second round of the playoffs to the Bossier-Shreveport Mudbugs, after having defeated the Oklahoma City Blazers in the first round. They would again win the CHL Championship in 2006–07, defeating the Laredo Bucks four games to two in the Cup Finals.

The following year, the Eagles would make it all the way to the Ray Miron President's Cup Finals once again. They would lose the series four games to none against the Arizona Sundogs. The Eagles would make it all the way once again in 2008-09, but would lose four games to one against the Texas Brahmas.

After the 2007–08 season, coach Chris Stewart retired, and Kevin McClelland was named as his replacement. Following the 2009–10 season, McClelland was not retained and Stewart, who had been working as team president and general manager since leaving the bench, resumed head coaching duties.

During the 2008–09 season, the Eagles hosted the 2009 CHL All-Star Game and took on a group of CHL All-Stars from various teams. The exhibition took place on January 14, 2009, at the Budweiser Events Center, with the Eagles defeating the CHL All-Stars, 8–4.

=== Move to ECHL (2011–2018) ===
During the 2011 Ray Miron President's Cup playoffs, the Eagles had been rumored to be transferring to the ECHL following the completion of the playoffs. Former International Hockey League commissioner Dennis Hextall has stated that he had heard that the Colorado Eagles may already be included in the ECHL's tentative schedule for the 2011–12 season.

On May 29, 2011, KEVN-TV in Rapid City, South Dakota reported that Colorado was to move to the ECHL in time for the 2011–12 season. The following day, the team announced that they would have a press conference on May 31 at the Budweiser Events Center and that local media were urged to attend and fans urged to listen to the press conference online or on a local radio station. At the press conference, Head Coach, General Manager and President Chris Stewart announced that the team had been accepted as an expansion franchise in the ECHL for the 2011–12 season.

In August 2011, the Eagles were assigned to the Western Conference's Mountain Division as part of the league realignment for the 2011–12 ECHL season.

They served as the second-tier affiliate of the National Hockey League's Winnipeg Jets and the American Hockey League's St. John's IceCaps until the end of the 2012–13 hockey season and then as the Calgary Flames and Adirondack Flames affiliate during the 2014–15 season.

In July 2016, head coach Chris Stewart retired as coach for the second time but remained with the organization as general manager. He was replaced by assistant coach and longtime Eagles player, Aaron Schneekloth. On July 20, the Eagles announced a four-year affiliation with the NHL's Colorado Avalanche and the AHL's San Antonio Rampage after one season of playing independent of affiliations. In their first season with the Avalanche affiliation, the Eagles would go on to finish second in the Mountain Division of the ECHL and then win the Kelly Cup as the 2017 playoffs champions. In their last season in the ECHL in 2017–18, the Eagles finished with back-to-back Kelly Cups with the 2018 playoff championship. Traditionally, the Kelly Cup is held by the winning team during the following season and returned before the playoffs, but the Eagles did not return the trophy to the league after leaving for the AHL and it had to be replaced. They eventually sent it to the 2019 ECHL champion Newfoundland Growlers before opening night of the 2019–20 ECHL season.

=== Move to the AHL ===
For the 2017–18 season, the National Hockey League added the Vegas Golden Knights as a 31st team. The approval of a new NHL team also led to discussions of adding a 31st team in the American Hockey League. With the Golden Knights choosing to affiliate with the Chicago Wolves instead of adding their own AHL expansion team, talks with other organizations were opened. The owners and managers of the Eagles began discussions with the Avalanche with interests into becoming an AHL expansion for the 2018–19 season. On October 10, 2017, the Avalanche and the Eagles officially announced that the club would be promoted to the AHL in 2018.

The Avalanche hired Greg Cronin as the Eagles' first AHL head coach and retained former head coach Aaron Schneekloth as an assistant. Cronin remained in the role for the Eagles first five seasons, qualifying for the playoff in each year. Prior to the 2022–23 season, the Avalanche announced a restructure of their executive committee with Kevin McDonald hired and introduced as the incoming Eagles General Manager, with Craig Billington re-assigned to other duties within the organization.

With the departure of Cronin, following his unveiling as the head coach of the Anaheim Ducks of the NHL, Schneekloth was re-instated as the Colorado Eagles head coach on July 7, 2023.

Prior to the 2025-26 season, Schneekloth accepted an assistant coaching role with the NHL's Seattle Kraken. On July 5, 2025, Mark Letestu was named the new Eagles head coach. Letestu would lead the Eagles to their first ever Western Conference Final appearance in their AHL history.

Letestu would last only one season with the Eagles until he accepted an assistant coaching job with the Vegas Golden Knights on June 30, 2026. On July 17, 2026, former Kitcheneer Ranger's head coach Jussi Ahokas was named the new head coach of the Colorado Eagles.

== Media appearances ==
Although the Eagles have been a relatively small team to the media, they have been featured many times. In 2004, the Eagles signed a contract with Altitude Sports and Entertainment to broadcast up to 10 games plus postseason games each year. The first TV broadcast for the Eagles was on November 5, 2004, against the New Mexico Scorpions that was broadcast on Altitude. Altitude and the Eagles parted ways in 2015 as the last broadcast was in the 2015 Kelly Cup Playoffs.

Notable games that Altitude broadcast include the 2005 Ray Miron President's Cup Game 5 where the Eagles won their first Presidents Cup. As well as the 2007 Ray Miron President's Cup Game 6 where the Eagles won their second Presidents Cup. More Broadcasts include the 2009 CHL All-Star Game and the 2013 ECHL All-Star Game, both hosted at Blue Arena (formerly Budweiser Events Center).

Altitude also hosted the NoCo Hockey Show in the late 2000s which was a monthly TV Show that featured Eagles highlights and Community events.

The Eagles Play-by-Play Commentators varied from 2004-06 between Mike Haynes and Doug McLeod with Peter McNab as the Color commentator. From 2006–2009, Tori Holt, who was the commentator for the Eagles on the radio from 2003–06, was the Commentator with Kevin McGlue as the Color Commentator. McGlue currently does the Radio Commentary for the Eagles.

The Eagles are now broadcast on AHL.TV and on the radio on KKPL 99.9 The Point. The Eagles were formerly on KPAW 107.9 The Bear.

The Eagles have also been recognized nationally by 2 Sportscenter appearances. One appearance was in 2007 when Greg Pankewicz scored an incredible goal in Game 7 of the second round of the 2007 President's Cup Playoffs against the Oklahoma City Blazers where he lifted the puck over the defender's stick, knocked it around the defender with his stick, and made a diving finish to put the puck in the net.

== Season records ==
Note: GP = Games played, W = Wins, L = Losses, OTL = Overtime losses, SOL=shootout losses, Pts = Points, GF = Goals for, GA = Goals against, PIM = Penalties in minutes

Records as of end of the 2025–26 AHL season.

Regular season											Playoffs					
Season	GP	W	L	OTL	SOL	Pts	GF	GA	PIM	Finish	Year	Prelims	1st round	2nd round	3rd round	Finals
Central Hockey League
2003–04	64	43	16	0	5	91	232	156	1453	1st, Northwest	2004	—	—	L, 1–3, WIC	—	—
2004–05	60	43	10	5	2	93	221	123	1345	1st, Northwest	2005	—	—	W, 4–1, TUL	W, 4–2, WIC	W, 4–1, LAR
2005–06	64	44	14	0	6	94	241	183	1898	1st, Northwest	2006	—	—	W, 4–3, OKC	L, 1–4, BS	—
2006–07	64	46	17	0	1	93	256	182	1944	1st, Northwest	2007	—	W, 4–2, YNG	W, 4–3, OKC	W, 4–2, MEM	W, 4–2, LAR
2007–08	64	37	20	2	5	81	254	223	1637	1st, Northwest	2008	—	BYE	W, 4–1, YNG	W, 4–3, TEX	L, 0–4, ARZ
2008–09	64	45	15	1	3	94	275	195	1429	1st, Northwest	2009	—	BYE	W, 4–0, BS	W, 4–2, MIS	L, 1–4, TEX
2009–10	64	42	15	5	2	91	277	208	1557	2nd, Northern	2010	—	BYE	L, 0–4, BS	—	—
2010–11	66	40	22	2	2	84	250	199	1352	2nd, Turner	2011	—	W, 3–1, QC	W, 3–1, MO	W, 4–3, RC	L, 3–4, BS
ECHL
2011–12	72	38	28	1	5	82	250	252	1485	2nd, Mountain	2012	—	L, 0–3, STK	—	—	—
2012–13	72	34	31	3	4	75	239	224	1534	3rd, Mountain	2013	—	L, 2–4, IDA	—	—	—
2013–14	71	33	26	7	5	78	211	218	1158	4th, Mountain	2014	—	L, 2–4, IDA	—	—	—
2014–15	72	41	23	4	4	90	236	209	1457	3rd, Pacific	2015	—	L, 3–4, ONT	—	—	—
2015–16	72	41	27	3	1	86	232	193	1427	1st, West	2016	—	L, 2–4, UTA	—	—	—
2016–17	72	47	20	2	3	99	265	206	1415	2nd, Mountain	2017	—	W, 4–1, IDA	W, 4–2, ALN	W, 4–1, TOL	W, 4–0, SC
2017–18	72	48	18	4	2	102	265	214	1377	1st, Mountain	2018	—	W, 4–2, WIC	W, 4–0, IDA	W, 4–3, FW	W, 4–3, FLA
American Hockey League
2018–19	68	36	27	4	1	77	191	205	1114	4th, Pacific	2019	—	L, 1–3, BAK	—	—	—
2019–20	56	34	18	3	1	72	188	162	683	2nd, Pacific	2020	Season cancelled due to the COVID-19 pandemic				
2020–21	34	15	15	3	1	34	101	104	318	5th, Pacific	2021 (Note: The 2021 Calder Cup playoffs were not held; the Pacific Division held a postseason tournament for the division title. The bottom four teams had single-elimination play-in games to qualify for the semifinals (the first two rounds). The division semifinals and finals were best-of-three for the John D. Chick Trophy (the last two rounds).)	—	OTW, 5–4, ONT	L, 1–5, SJ	—	—
2021–22	68	39	22	4	3	85	244	207	815	3rd, Pacific	2022	W, 2–0, HSK	W, 3–0, ONT	L, 1–3, STK	—	—
2022–23	72	40	22	7	3	90	210	187	1000	3rd, Pacific	2023	W, 2–0, ONT	L, 2–3, CV	—	—	—
2023–24	72	40	25	5	2	87	215	195	1029	4th, Pacific	2024	L, 1–2, ABB	—	—	—	—
2024–25	72	43	21	5	3	94	250	185	827	1st, Pacific	2025	BYE	W, 3–1, SJ	L, 2–3, ABB	—	—
2025–26	72	41	20	6	5	93	237	198	880	2nd, Pacific	2026	W, 2–0, SD	W, 3–1, HSK	W, 3–1, CV	L, 3–4, CHI	—

== Players ==
=== Current roster ===
Updated November 20, 2026.

No.	Nat	Player	Pos	S/G	Age	Acquired	Birthplace	Contract
5	(United States)	Wyatt Aamodt (A)	D	L	28	2022	Hermantown, Minnesota	Avalanche
34	(Canada)	Adam Beckman	LW	L	25	2026	Saskatoon, Saskatchewan	Avalanche
2	(United States)	Sean Behrens	D	L	23	2024	Barrington, Illinois	Avalanche
90	(Canada)	Jake Chiasson (PTO)	C	R	23	2026	Abbotsford, British Columbia	Eagles
74	(United States)	Reilly Connors	C	R	26	2025	Madison, Connecticut	Eagles
14	(United States)	Matthew DiMarsico	LW	L	22	2026	Wexford, Pennsylvania	Avalanche
3	(United States)	Domenick Fensore	D	L	25	2026	Bronxville, New York	Avalanche
82	(Canada)	Evan Friesen	C	L	22	2025	Winnipeg, Manitoba	Eagles
28	(United States)	Alex Gagne	D	L	24	2025	Bedford, New Hampshire	Avalanche
58	(United States)	Cooper Gay	LW	L	24	2025	Edina, Minnesota	Avalanche
18	(United States)	Vinnie Hinostroza (A)	RW	R	32	2026	Melrose Park, Illinois	Avalanche
55	(Slovakia)	Maros Jedlicka	LW	L	24	2024	Trnava, Slovakia	Eagles
15	(United States)	Kevin Lombardi	RW	R	28	2026	Schwenksville, Pennsylvania	Eagles
22	(Sweden)	Fabian Lysell	RW	R	23	2026	Göteborg, Sweden	Avalanche
16	(Canada)	Taylor Makar	LW	L	25	2025	Calgary, Alberta	Avalanche
21	(United States)	Jayson Megna (C)	C	R	36	2024	Fort Lauderdale, Florida	Eagles
10	(Russia)	Georgii Merkulov	C	L	26	2026	Ryazan, Russia	Avalanche
67	(Canada)	Keaton Middleton (A)	D	L	28	2020	Stratford, Ontario	Avalanche
50	(Canada)	Trent Miner	G	R	25	2021	Souris, Manitoba	Avalanche
30	(Russia)	Ilya Nabokov	G	L	23	2026	Kasli, Russia	Avalanche
57	(Canada)	Tristen Nielsen	C	L	26	2025	Fort St. John, British Columbia	Avalanche
85	(Russia)	Nikita Prishchepov	LW	L	22	2024	Orenburg, Russia	Avalanche
44	(Sweden)	Gustav Stjernberg	D	R	24	2026	Enebyberg, Sweden	Avalanche
20	(Canada)	Yanick Turcotte	LW	L	30	2026	Québec City, Québec	Eagles
24	(Canada)	Sage Weinstein	D	L	21	2025	Edmonton, Alberta	Avalanche
48	(United States)	Jake Wise	C	L	26	2024	Naples, Florida	Eagles
86	(United States)	Christian Wolanin	D	L	31	2026	Quebec, Quebec	Avalanche

=== Team captains ===
- Brent Thompson, 2003–04
- Greg Pankewicz, 2004–09
- Riley Nelson, 2009–14
- Trent Daavettila, 2014–15
- Sean Zimmerman, 2015-16
- Matt Garbowsky, 2017–18
- Mark Alt, 2018–20
- T.J. Tynan, 2020–21
- Jayson Megna & Jacob MacDonald (co-captains), 2021–2022
- Brad Hunt, 2023–2024
- Jayson Megna, 2024–present

=== Retired numbers ===
Colorado Eagles retired numbers
No.	Player	Position	Career	No. retirement
12	Riley Nelson	C	2003–2014	December 12, 2014
17	Ryan Tobler	LW	2003–2010	March 27, 2015
23	Aaron Schneekloth	D	2006–2013	March 22, 2019
27	Brad Williamson	D	2003–2008	March 22, 2019
89	Greg Pankewicz	RW	2003–2009	October 16, 2009

== Awards and honors ==
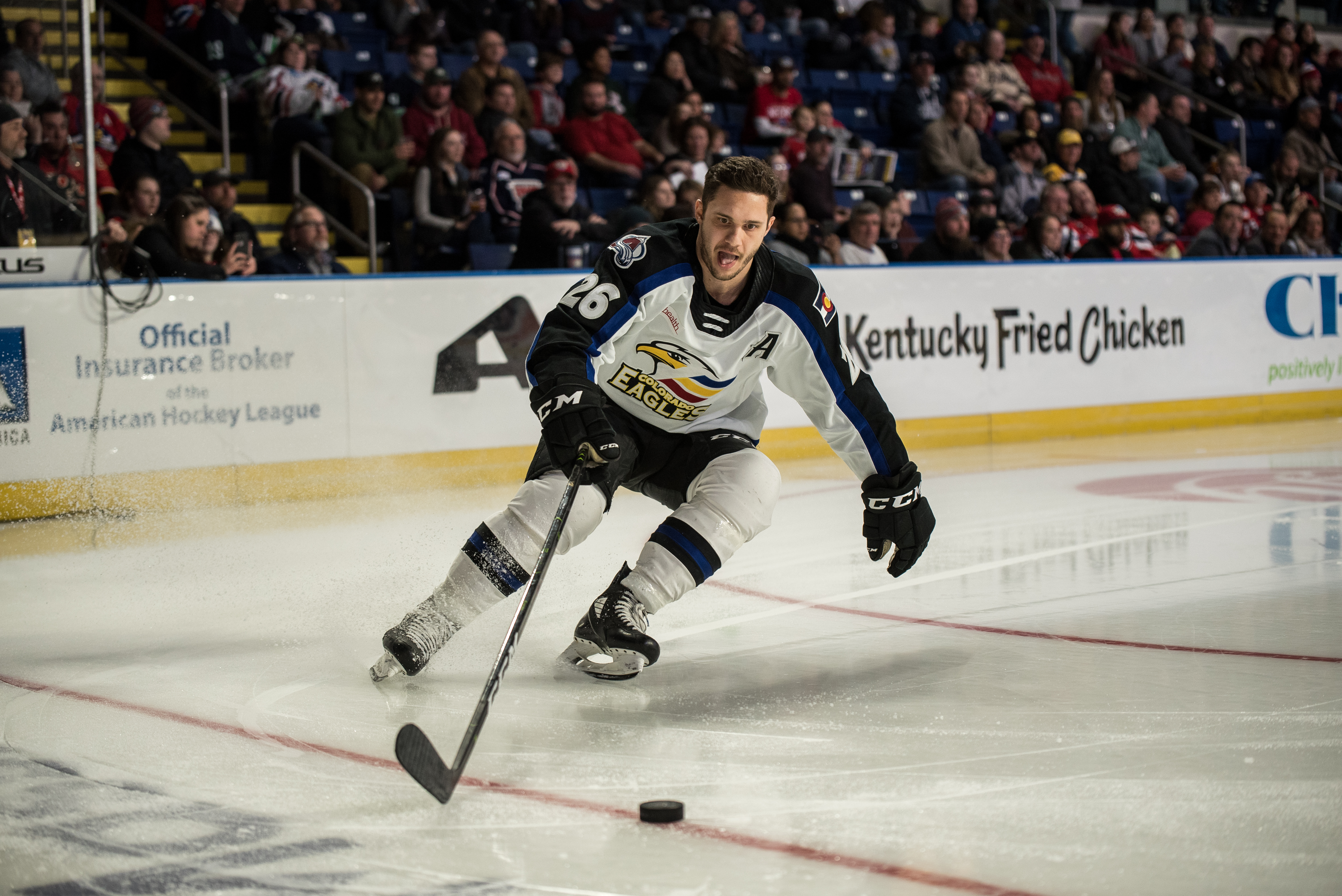
Andrew Agozzino representing the Eagles at the 2019 AHL All-Star Classic.

Ray Miron President's Cup
CHL playoff champion

- 2005, 2007

Kelly Cup
ECHL playoff champion

- 2017, 2018

Bud Poile Governors' Cup
CHL regular season champion

- 2004–05, 2005–06, 2008–09

Conference playoff championship

- CHL – 2005, 2007, 2008, 2009, 2011
- ECHL – 2017, 2018

Division titles

- CHL – 2003–04, 2004–05, 2005–06, 2006–07, 2007–08, 2008–09
- ECHL – 2015–16, 2017–18
- AHL – 2024–25
