= Alexandria Warthogs =

- City: Alexandria, Louisiana
- League: Western Professional Hockey League
- Founded: 1998
- Folded: 2000
- Home arena: Rapides Parish Coliseum
- Colours: Red, white, black, gray

Franchise history
- 1998–2000: Alexandria Warthogs

The Alexandria Warthogs were a professional ice hockey team based in Alexandria, Louisiana. They played from 1998 to 2000 as a member of the Western Professional Hockey League in the Rapides Parish Coliseum. The team folded in 2000, while the league itself was merged into the Central Hockey League in 2001 but never returned to Alexandria.

== Season-by-season record ==
Season	GP	W	L	OTL	Pts	GF	GA	Place	Playoffs
1998–99	69	25	30	14	64	264	310	5th, East	Did not qualify
1999–00	71	21	40	10	52	211	307	6th, Eastern	Did not qualify
