= San Angelo Outlaws =

- City: San Angelo, Texas
- League: Western Professional Hockey League (1997–2001); Central Hockey League (2001–02)
- Founded: 1997 (In the WPHL)
- Home arena: San Angelo Coliseum
- Head coach: Shaun Clouston (1997–1999); Mike Collins (1999–2000); Barry Smith (2000–2002)

Franchise history
- 1997–2002: San Angelo Outlaws
- 2002–2005: San Angelo Saints

The San Angelo Outlaws are a defunct American minor professional ice hockey team that played in the Western Professional Hockey League from 1997 to 2001 and the Central Hockey League in the 2001–02 season. They were based in San Angelo, Texas and played their home games out of the San Angelo Coliseum. The WPHL ceased operations in 2001 and the Central Hockey League absorbed the remaining ten WPHL teams, including the Outlaws. One year later, the team was renamed to the San Angelo Saints.

== Season-by-season record ==
Season	GP	W	L	OTL	SOL	Pts	GF	GA	Finish	Playoffs
1997–98	69	29	34	6	—	64	280	326	3rd, Western	Lost in 1st round
1998–99	69	39	25	5	—	83	284	253	2nd, Western	Lost in Finals
1999–2000	70	26	41	3	—	55	225	297	5th, Western	Did not qualify
2000–01	70	29	33	8	—	62	225	284	4th, Western	Lost in 1st round
2001–02	64	29	31	—	4	62	207	228	4th, Southeast	Did not qualify
