= Memorial Coliseum (Corpus Christi) =

Arena in Corpus Christi, Texas

- Interactive map of Memorial Coliseum
- Location: Corpus Christi, Texas
- Coordinates: 27°47′14.6″N 97°23′36.5″W
- Capacity: 3,000

Construction
- Opened: September 26, 1954
- Closed: January 2010
- Demolished: June 2010

Tenant
- Corpus Chrisiti IceRays (WPHL) (1998–2001)

The Memorial Coliseum was an arena in Corpus Christi, Texas that had a capacity of about 3,000 which was demolished in June 2010.

== Dedication ==
The Coliseum was dedicated on September 26, 1954 to 400 men and women who gave their lives in World War II. The dedication was sponsored by the Gold Star Mothers of Texas and was attended by local, state and military officials. It is also notable that tejano music star Selena performed here on February 7, 1993 in a live concert which would later be released on CD as Selena Live! that also won a Grammy in 1994.

== Architecture ==
The Memorial Coliseum was an architecturally significant building of the Mid-Century modern style. Extremely well constructed, its footings were anchored into the original seabed, well below the 1940s fill. The curved roof contained 260 tons of structural steel in a lamella space frame (diamond shape design) with a thin concrete cover. This strong, yet light roof structure allowed for the barrel-shaped 224-foot unsupported span, which was the world’s longest when it was built. As an additional plus factor, this kind of construction keeps insurance costs low and maintenance over 40 years is lower than in traditional buildings.
The architect of Memorial Coliseum, Richard S. Colley, was Corpus Christi's local star in the world of architecture.
The original design included a comprehensive plan for a bayfront 'Civic Center' which would include a City Hall, an auditorium/coliseum, a medium-size exposition hall and two parks.

Colley's Coliseum design began attracting the attention of the national architectural community even before it was built. In January 1952, the ‘auditorium plan’ (Coliseum and Exposition Hall) was awarded the annual jury prize by Progressive Architecture for being “the most noteworthy submission among buildings for public use.” The entire complex (Coliseum, Exposition Hall and City Hall) were featured in a 16-page article in the February 1953 issue of Progressive Architecture which included photographs, floor plans and construction details.
In 1954, during the final construction phase of the Coliseum, Progressive Architecture featured the building again. Its lamella roof was pictured on the magazine’s cover and the related article discussed the design of the auditorium and included several photos of the building under construction.

== Photographs ==
In 1955, Memorial Coliseum was included in the “Building and Construction” section of the Encyclopædia Britannica Book-of-the-Year.
In 1958, the Coliseum was photographed for the Carnegie Study of the Arts of the United States by photographer John Waggaman. It was chosen because of its “significance in the history of American Architecture” and for its “successful merger of beauty and functionality.” A photograph of Memorial Coliseum was also displayed in the United States pavilion at Expo 58, the 1958 Brussels World’s Fair.
Both the unusual design and the innovative construction methods of Memorial Coliseum were featured in Engineering News-Record, Architectural Forum, United States Steel trade magazine, Time magazine, Architectural Record, Welding Arcs, L’architecture d’aujourd’hui (France), Techniques et Architecture (France) and Informes de la Construccion (Spain), just to name a few.

== Notable Events ==
On January 12, 1992, WWF Wrestling Challenge aired from the Corpus Christi Memorial Auditorium. During an incident on Brutus Beefcake's "Barber Shop" talk show segment, Shawn Michaels superkicked partner Marty Jannetty and threw him through a glass window on the set of Beefcake's talk show, breaking up the tag team of The Rockers, known as The Barber Shop Window. The segment was taped on December 2, 1991.

== Demolition ==
As of January 12, 2010 the Memorial Coliseum was scheduled to be demolished. The coliseum was taken down by demolition June 30, 2010.

== Bibliography ==
- "Civic Buildings: Corpus Christi.” Progressive Architecture 34 (February 1953): 83-92.
  “Civilian Defense Building and City Auditorium: Corpus Christi, Texas.” Progressive Architecture 33 (June 1952): 83.
- “Cubierta Aligerada De Gran Luz.” Informes de la Construccion (April 1955).
- Dames, Urban. “Columbia Iron Welds Structural Steel Framework.” Welding Arcs 20 (January 1954): 12-13.
- “High Span Light Roof.” Architectural Forum (March 1954).
- Kiewitt, Dr. G.R. “The New Look in Lamella Roof Construction.” Reprinted from February 1960 Architectural Record by Roof Structures, Inc.
- “Lamella Steel Arches: Convention and Exhibition Hall, Corpus Christi, Texas.” Progressive Architecture 35 (June 1954): 106-107.
- Peissi, P. "Quelques Réflexions sur l'esthétique de la construction métallique." L'architecture d'aujourd'hui (March 1956): 74-75.
- “Steel lamella supports long-span roof.” Engineering News-Record (November 26, 1953): 41.
