= Oklahoma City Blazers (1992–2009) =

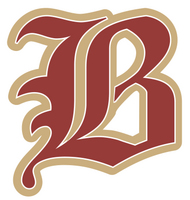
- City: Oklahoma City, Oklahoma
- League: Central Hockey League
- Conference: Northern
- Division: Northeast
- Founded: 1992
- Folded: 2009
- Home arena: Cox Convention Center
- Colors: Burgundy, gold, white
- Owner(s): Bob Funk
- Head coach: Doug Sauter

Franchise history
- 1992–2009: Oklahoma City Blazers

Championships
- Division titles: 9
- Ray Miron President's Cup: 2

The Oklahoma City Blazers were a professional ice hockey team based in Oklahoma City, Oklahoma, that played in the Central Hockey League. The Blazers played at the Myriad Convention Center (later renamed the Cox Convention Center, which was located in downtown Oklahoma City. On July 2, 2009, the Blazers ceased operations after failing to reach a lease agreement with the city.

From 2010 to 2015, the market was served by the Oklahoma City Barons, an American Hockey League team playing at Cox Convention Center as the top affiliate of the National Hockey League's Edmonton Oilers.

== History ==
In 1992, a new Central Hockey League began play in the same territory as the older league. It also acquired several team names in tribute to the former CHL, including the Oklahoma City Blazers. The new Blazers began play in the Myriad Convention Center, the same home arena as the old team.

They averaged 9,128 fans per game over 17 seasons. The franchise led the CHL in attendance in each of its 17 seasons in the league. On the ice, the Blazers excelled as well, winning nine regular season division championships (including seven straight from 1996 to 2003), five regular season points titles, and CHL championships in 1996 and 2001. The franchise's two greatest stars, Joe Burton and Hardy Sauter, are the CHL's first and third all-time career leading scorers.

In 2002, the Blazers changed their home venue to the new Ford Center.

In 2009, the Blazers withdrew their application for a lease extension with the Ford Center and ceased operations. It was reported at the time that city officials were in negotiations with the American Hockey League for an expansion franchise. Following months of speculation, Oklahoma City was granted an AHL franchise on February 10, 2010, when the NHL's Edmonton Oilers reactivated their dormant affiliate and created the Oklahoma City Barons. They began play in the 2010–11 season in the smaller Cox Convention Center (formerly the Myriad) and the team was operated by the former owner of the Blazers, Bob Funk.

John Brooks, the radio play-by-play voice for the University of Oklahoma football and men's basketball teams from 1978 to 1991 and of the original Blazers hockey team, was the on-air play-by-play voice of the relaunched Blazers, however he would split the play-by-play duties with then Oklahoma City 89ers voice Brian Barnhart for the 1992–93 season only before becoming the full-time play-by-play voice of the team in the 1993–94 season. Brooks semi-retired from the Blazers after 2004–05 season after 27 seasons in total for both franchises. Brooks was inducted into the Blazers Hall of Fame on March 11, 2005. After 2004–05 season, Brooks was succeeded by Jim Byers who was the then play-by-play voice for the Oklahoma Redhawks and the occasional substitute play-by-play voice of the Blazers in place of Brooks for several years when Brooks was unavailable or handling the play-by-play duties for televised Blazer games. Jim Byers also served as a linesman in then revived Central Hockey League from 1992 to 1995. Following his semi-retirement from full-time play-by-play, Brooks would return to call a few games and playoffs in the following seasons when Jim Byers was handing the play-by-play duties (In a bit of a so-called swap or role reverse with Brooks as was in years prior.) when select Blazers games against the Tulsa Oilers were televised via Cox Cable Oklahoma channel 7 (Simulcasted on Cox Cable Oklahoma channel 3 in Tulsa.) or was unavailable due to the start of the Oklahoma RedHawks seasons.

== Championships ==
Year	League	Trophy
1995–96	CHL	William "Bill" Levins Memorial Cup
2000–01	CHL	Ray Miron Cup

== Seasons ==
Key of colors and symbols
Color/symbol	Explanation
†	CHL champions
‡	Conference champions
↑	Division champions
#	Led league in points

Year-by-year listing of Oklahoma City Blazers seasons
CHL season	Conference	Division	Regular season										Postseason					
CHL season	Conference	Division	Finish	GP	W	L	T	OT	SOL	Pts	GF	GA	GP	W	L	GF	GA	Result
1992–93	—	—	1st	60	39	18	—	1	2	81^{#}	291	232	11	5	6	39	52	Won semifinals vs. Memphis RiverKings, 4–2; Lost Levins Trophy Finals vs. Tulsa Oilers, 1–4
1993–94	—	—	3rd	64	35	23	6	—	—	76	291	232	11	5	6	39	52	Lost semifinals vs. Tulsa Oilers, 3–4
1994–95	—	—	4th	66	34	23	9	—	—	77	274	267	5	1	4	18	36	Lost semifinals vs. Wichita Thunder, 1–4
1995–96†	—	—	1st	64	47	13	—	—	4	98	327	224	13	8	5	44	39	Won semifinals vs. Tulsa Oilers, 4–2; Won Bill Levins Trophy vs. San Antonio Iguanas, 4–3
1996–97	—	Western^{↑}	1st	66	48	12	—	—	6	98	327	224	13	8	5	44	39	Lost Division Semifinals vs. Wichita Thunder, 1–3
1997–98	—	Western^{↑}	1st	70	48	19	—	—	3	99	319	237	11	6	5	37	34	Won Division Semifinals vs. Memphis RiverKings, 3–1; Lost division finals vs. Wichita Thunder, 3–4
1998–99	—	Western^{↑}	1st	70	49	19	—	—	3	100	322	203	13	9	4	45	33	Won Division Semifinals vs. Topeka ScareCrows, 3–0; Won Division Finals vs. San Antonio Iguanas, 4–0; Lost Bill Levins Cup vs. Huntsville Channel Cats, 2–4
1999–2000	—	Western^{↑}	1st	70	39	24	—	—	2	85	248	220	8	3	5	23	23	Won Division Semifinals vs. Wichita Thunder, 3–2; Lost Conference Finals vs. Indianapolis Ice, 3–0
2000–01†	—	Western^{↑}	1st	70	48	19	—	—	3	99	273	185	13	10	3	38	24	Won Division Semifinals vs. Tulsa Oilers, 3–0; Won Division Finals vs. San Antonio Iguanas, 3–2; Won Ray Miron President's Cup vs. Columbus Cottonmouths, 4–1
2001–02	Northern	Northwest^{↑}	1st	64	35	22	—	—	7	77	236	203	4	1	3	10	12	Lost Conference Quarterfinals vs. Bossier-Shreveport Mudbugs, 1–3
2002–03	Northern	Northwest^{↑}	1st	64	35	22	—	1	6	81	225	196	5	2	3	19	23	Lost Conference Semifinals vs. Memphis RiverKings, 2–3
2003–04	Northern	Northwest	5th	64	29	28	—	2	5	65	176	194	Did not qualify					
2004–05	Northern	Northwest	3rd	60	27	22	—	2	9	65	187	180	Did not qualify					
2005–06	Northern	Northwest	3rd	60	27	22	—	2	9	75	233	215	7	3	4	23	28	Lost Conference Semifinals vs. Colorado Eagles, 3–4
2006–07	Northern	—	2nd	64	35	21	—	2	6	78	211	214	14	7	7	38	43	Won Conference Quarterfinals vs. Memphis RiverKings, 4–3; Lost Conference Semifinals vs. Colorado Eagles, 3–4
2007–08	Northern	—	2nd	64	28	30	—	2	4	62	188	193	Did not qualify					
2008–09	Northern	—	3rd	64	39	18	—	5	2	85	202	158	6	2	4	15	19	Lost Conference Semifinals vs. Mississippi RiverKings, 2–4

== Personnel ==
=== Head coaches ===
#	Name	Term	Regular season					Playoffs				Championships/awards won	Reference
#	Name	Term	GC	W	L	T	OTL	Win%	GC	W	L	Championships/awards won	Reference
1	Mike McEwen	1992–1995	190	108	67	3	12	.608	23	9	14		
2	Doug Sauter	1995–2009	918	544	291	—	83	.593	107	59	48	1996 CHL Coach of the Year, 1996 Levins Trophy Championship; 2001 Ray Miron President's Cup Championship	

=== Retired numbers ===
- 19 – Joe Burton
- 27 – John Brooks, play-by-play broadcaster

=== General managers ===
- Brad Lund, 1992–2000
- Chris Presson, 2000–2004
- DeBray Ayala, 2004–2009
