= Central Hockey League =

North American mid-level minor professional ice hockey league

- Final CHL logo, used until 2014
- Sport: Ice hockey
- Founded: 1992
- Folded: 2014
- Countries: United States; Canada
- Last champion: Allen Americans
- Most titles: (tie) Allen Americans, Wichita Thunder, Oklahoma City Blazers, Memphis RiverKings, Laredo Bucks, & Colorado Eagles (2)

The Central Hockey League (CHL) was a North American mid-level minor professional ice hockey league which operated from 1992 until 2014. It was founded by Ray Miron and Bill Levins and later sold to Global Entertainment Corporation, which operated the league from 2000 to 2013, at which point it was purchased by the individual franchise owners. As of the end of its final season in 2014, three of the 30 National Hockey League teams had affiliations with the CHL: the Dallas Stars, Minnesota Wild, and Tampa Bay Lightning.

Several teams of defunct leagues joined the CHL along its history, including the Southern Hockey League, Western Professional Hockey League and International Hockey League. After two teams suspended operations during the 2014 offseason, the ECHL accepted the remaining seven teams as members in October 2014, meaning the end for the CHL after 22 seasons.

== History ==
The Central Hockey League (CHL) was revived in 1992 by Ray Miron and the efforts of Bill Levins, with the idea of central ownership of both the league and the teams. Both men were from hockey backgrounds. Miron had been general manager of the Colorado Rockies (now the New Jersey Devils), and had briefly been president of the previous Central Hockey League in 1976. In the inaugural 1992–93 season the league had six teams, including the Oklahoma City Blazers, the Tulsa Oilers, the Wichita Thunder, the Memphis RiverKings, the Dallas Freeze and the Fort Worth Fire.

After Levins died, the league's championship trophy (awarded to the winner of the CHL playoffs) was renamed the Levins Cup. After running the league for eight years, Miron retired in 2000 and sold the league. The Levins Cup was renamed the Ray Miron President's Cup. After experiments in expansion and an ongoing battle for players and markets with the Western Professional Hockey League (WPHL) throughout the late 1990s, the CHL merged with the WPHL in 2001, with 10 former WPHL teams joining the CHL for the 2001–02 season. However, several years of gradual contraction in the former WPHL markets claimed most of these teams in the ensuing years. The last active former WPHL team, the Fort Worth Brahmas, effectively ceased operations following the 2012–13 season. Subsequently, in 2010, the International Hockey League folded and all five remaining IHL teams joined the CHL; the last of these, the Quad City Mallards, folded in 2018 in the ECHL.

Brad Treliving, who co-founded the WPHL in 1996, became CHL commissioner following the merger, before leaving to join the Phoenix Coyotes. Duane Lewis was named the permanent commissioner in June 2008. In October 2013, the CHL appointed former president of the Pittsburgh Penguins Steve Ryan to succeed Lewis.

On March 8, 2013, the Central Hockey League announced an expansion team in Brampton, Ontario. The Brampton Beast would become the first Canadian team in the CHL's history. In October 2013, the Central Hockey League was purchased from Global Entertainment by all the team owners, putting the CHL business model in line with that of the NHL and AHL.

On May 2, 2014 the St. Charles Chill ceased operations. Soon after, the Arizona Sundogs and Denver Cutthroats suspended operations. On October 7, 2014, it was announced that the ECHL had accepted the Central Hockey League's remaining seven teams as members for the 2014–15 season, officially signaling the end of the Central Hockey League after 22 seasons.

=== Legacy ===
The Allen Americans, who won the last two CHL President's Cups, won two consecutive ECHL titles following the folding of the Central Hockey League.

The Mississippi RiverKings, Tulsa Oilers and Wichita Thunder were the last of the original six franchises still playing at the end of the CHL's tenure; the RiverKings since folded, in 2018. In the 2014–15 season, ten teams (Allen, Brampton, Colorado, Evansville, Fort Wayne, Missouri, Quad City, Rapid City, Tulsa, and Wichita) were in the ECHL, two teams (Mississippi and Columbus) were in the SPHL, and four organizations (Corpus Christi, Fort Worth Brahmas, Odessa, and Rio Grande Valley) fielded junior teams in the NAHL.

Of the CHL's remaining teams prior to October 7, 2014, Tulsa, Wichita, Allen, Colorado, Fort Wayne, Missouri (now Kansas City), and Rapid City are all still active as of the 2025-26 season, (with Tulsa and Wichita from the league's inial season), with Colorado in the AHL.

== Teams ==
A map showing the expanse of all historical CHL teams
Teams joined the ECHL on October 7, 2014
Teams that joined another league prior to the folding of the CHL
Defunct, relocated, or folded to make room for team from another league
- Allen Americans (Allen, Texas; 2009–14. Joined the ECHL on October 7, 2014.)
- Amarillo Gorillas (Amarillo, Texas; 1996–2001 WPHL, 2001–2010 CHL. Originally named the Amarillo Rattlers from 1996 to 2002. Suspended operations on May 19, 2010 and were replaced by the Amarillo Bulls of the North American Hockey League (NAHL) in the same year.)
- Arizona Sundogs (Prescott Valley, Arizona; 2006–2014. Suspended operations on August 20, 2014.)
- Austin Ice Bats (Austin, Texas; 1996–2001 WPHL, 2001–2008 CHL. Suspended operations on May 7, 2008, and the franchise was never re-established.)
- Bloomington Blaze (Bloomington, Illinois; 2011–2013 CHL. Joined the Southern Professional Hockey League (SPHL) under new ownership as the Bloomington Thunder on May 15, 2013.)
- Bloomington PrairieThunder (Bloomington, Illinois; 2006–2010 UHL/IHL, 2010–11 CHL. Failed to contact U.S. Cellular Coliseum for an extended lease leading to a new professional hockey franchise named the Bloomington Blaze replacing them. Officially ceased operations on July 3, 2011.)
- Border City Bandits (Texarkana, Texas; 2000–01. Franchise suspended by league mid-season on February 20, 2001.)
- Bossier-Shreveport Mudbugs (Bossier City–Shreveport, Louisiana; 1997–2001 WPHL, 2001–2011 CHL. Franchise folded on June 10, 2011. Launched a new NAHL team in 2016 as the Shreveport Mudbugs.)
- Brampton Beast (Brampton, Ontario; 2013–14. Joined the ECHL on October 7, 2014.)
- Colorado Eagles (Loveland, Colorado; 2003–2011. Joined the ECHL on May 29, 2011. Joined American Hockey League on October 10, 2017 for 2018-2019 season.)
- Columbus Cottonmouths (Columbus, Georgia; 1996–2001. Joined the ECHL from 2001 to 2004. Joined the SPHL in 2004.)
- Corpus Christi IceRays (Corpus Christi, Texas; 1998–2001 WPHL, 2001–2010 CHL. Owners purchased an NAHL franchise on May 21, 2010, and replaced the CHL team with a team of the same name.)
- Dallas Freeze (Dallas, Texas; 1992–1995.)
- Dayton Gems (Dayton, Ohio; 2009–10 IHL, 2010–2012 CHL. Ceased operations on May 17, 2012.)
- Denver Cutthroats (Denver, Colorado; 2012–2014. Suspended operations on August 20, 2014.)
- El Paso Buzzards (El Paso, Texas; 1996–2001 WPHL, 2001–2003 CHL.)
- Evansville IceMen (Evansville, Indiana; 2010–2012. Joined the ECHL on May 17, 2012.)
- Fayetteville Force (Fayetteville, North Carolina; 1997–2001.)
- Fort Wayne Komets (Fort Wayne, Indiana; 1952–1999 IHL, 1999–2007 UHL, 2007–2010 IHL, 2010–2012 CHL, joined the ECHL on May 17, 2012.)
- Fort Worth Brahmas (Fort Worth, Texas; 1997–2001 WPHL, 2001–2006, 2007–2013 CHL. League announced Fort Worth would suspend operations on June 16, 2013, and the team would be replaced by an NAHL team called the Lone Star Brahmas in the same year.)
- Fort Worth Fire (Fort Worth, Texas; 1992–1999.)
- Huntsville Channel Cats (Huntsville, Alabama; 1995–96 SHL, 1996–2001 CHL. Changed name to Huntsville Tornado for 2000–01.)
- Indianapolis Ice (Indianapolis, Indiana; 1988–99 IHL, 1999–2004 CHL. Franchise relocated and renamed the Topeka Tarantulas for 2004–05.)
- Laredo Bucks (Laredo, Texas; 2002–2012. Franchise folded on May 1, 2012, before being sold on August 1, 2012, and moved to St. Charles, Missouri. Played as St. Charles Chill for the 2013–14 season.)
- Lubbock Cotton Kings (Lubbock, Texas; 1999–2001 WPHL, 2001–2007 CHL. Suspended operations June 20, 2007, and the franchise was never re-established.)
- Macon Whoopee (Macon, Georgia; 1996–2001. Folded and replaced with another team of the same name in the ECHL for 2001–02.)
- Mississippi RiverKings (Southaven, Mississippi; 1992–2011. Known as Memphis RiverKings from 1992 to 2007, moved to the SPHL on June 13, 2011.)
- Missouri Mavericks (Independence, Missouri; 2009–2014. Joined the ECHL on October 7, 2014.)
- Nashville Ice Flyers (Nashville, Tennessee; 1996–1998. Originally called the Nashville Nighthawks for the 1996–97 season. Team folded shortly after the 1997–98 season due to the introduction of the NHL's Nashville Predators.)
- New Mexico Scorpions (Rio Rancho, New Mexico; 1996–2001 WPHL, 2001–2009 CHL. Folded on July 2, 2009.)
- Odessa Jackalopes (Odessa, Texas; 1997–2001 WPHL, 2001–2011 CHL. The ownership group left the CHL and joined the NAHL by purchasing an existing NAHL franchise, moving it to Odessa, and adopting the same name.)
- Oklahoma City Blazers (Oklahoma City; 1992–2009. Folded on July 2, 2009. Replaced by the Oklahoma City Barons of the American Hockey League in 2010.)
- Quad City Mallards (Moline, Illinois; 2009–10 IHL, 2010–2014 CHL. Joined the ECHL on October 7, 2014.)
- Rapid City Rush (Rapid City, South Dakota; 2008–2014. Joined the ECHL on October 7, 2014.)
- Rio Grande Valley Killer Bees (Hidalgo, Texas; 2003–2012. Ceased operations on June 20, 2012, and was replaced by a team of the same name in the NAHL in 2013.)
- Rocky Mountain Rage (Broomfield, Colorado; 2006–2009. Suspended operations on June 18, 2009, and the franchise was never re-established.)
- San Angelo Saints (San Angelo, Texas; 1997–2001 WPHL, 2001–2005 CHL. Originally named the San Angelo Outlaws from 1997 to 2002.)
- San Antonio Iguanas (San Antonio, Texas; 1994–1997, 1998–2002. Ceased operations on June 26, 2002, after the AHL team, the San Antonio Rampage, was introduced.)
- St. Charles Chill (St. Charles, Missouri; 2013–14. Ceased operations on May 2, 2014.)
- Topeka ScareCrows (Topeka, Kansas; 1998–2001. Franchise terminated by the league on February 20, 2001, due to an ownership issue. However, they finished the season and played their last game on April 10, 2001. The ScareCrows were replaced by a junior hockey team of the same name the following season in the United States Hockey League.)
- Topeka Tarantulas (Topeka, Kansas; 2004–05. Franchise originally known as the Indianapolis Ice before relocating.)
- Tulsa Oilers (Tulsa, Oklahoma; 1992–2014. Joined the ECHL on October 7, 2014.)
- Wichita Thunder (Wichita, Kansas; 1992–2014. Joined the ECHL on October 7, 2014.)
- Youngstown SteelHounds (Youngstown, Ohio; 2005–2008. Franchise terminated by the league for non-payment of league dues on June 2, 2008.)

=== Expansion ===
Expansion of teams in the Central Hockey League
Year	Teams	Expansion	Defunct	Suspended	Return from hiatus	Relocated	Name changes
1992–93	6	Dallas Freeze; Fort Worth Fire; Memphis RiverKings; Oklahoma City Blazers; Tulsa Oilers; Wichita Thunder					
1993–94	6						
1994–95	7	San Antonio Iguanas					
1995–96	6		Dallas Freeze				
1996–97	10	Columbus Cottonmouths; Huntsville Channel Cats; Macon Whoopie; Nashville Nighthawks					
1997–98	10	Fayetteville Force		San Antonio Iguanas			Nashville Nighthawks → Nashville Ice Flyers
1998–99	11	Topeka Scarecrows	Nashville Ice Flyers		San Antonio Iguanas		
1999–00	11	Indianapolis Ice	Fort Worth Fire				
2000–01	12	Border City Bandits	Border City Bandits (defunct mid-season)				Huntsville Channel Cats → Huntsville Tornado
2001–02	16	Amarillo Rattlers (from WPHL); Austin Ice Bats (from WPHL); Bossier-Shreveport Mudbugs (from WPHL); Corpus Christi Ice Rays (from WPHL); El Paso Buzzards (from WPHL); Fort Worth Brahmas (from WPHL); Lubbock Cotton Kings (from WPHL); New Mexico Scorpions (from WPHL); Odessa Jackalopes (from WPHL); San Angelo Outlaws (from WPHL)	Columbus Cottonmouths (to ECHL); Fayetteville Force; Huntsville Tornado; Macon Whoopie (replaced by ECHL); Topeka Scarecrows (replaced by USHL)				
2002–03	16	Laredo Bucks	San Antonio Iguanas				Amarillo Rattlers → Amarillo Gorillas; San Angelo Outlaws → San Angelo Saints
2003–04	17	Colorado Eagles; Rio Grande Valley Killer Bees	El Paso Buzzards				Corpus Christi Ice Rays → Corpus Christi Rayz
2004–05	17					Indianapolis Ice → Topeka Tarantulas	
2005–06	15	Youngstown SteelHounds	San Angelo Saints; Topeka Tarantulas	New Mexico Scorpions			
2006–07	17	Arizona Sundogs; Rocky Mountain Rage		Fort Worth Brahmas	New Mexico Scorpions		
2007–08	17		Lubbock Cotton Kings		Fort Worth Brahmas		Fort Worth Brahmas → Texas Brahmas; Memphis RiverKings → Mississippi RiverKings
2008–09	16	Rapid City Rush	Austin Ice Bats; Youngstown Steelhounds				Corpus Christi Rayz → Corpus Christi IceRays
2009–10	15	Allen Americans; Missouri Mavericks	New Mexico Scorpions; Oklahoma City Blazers; Rocky Mountain Rage				
2010–11	18	Bloomington PrairieThunder (from IHL); Dayton Gems (from IHL); Evansville IceMen (from IHL); Fort Wayne Komets (from IHL); Quad City Mallards (from IHL)	Amarillo Gorillas; Corpus Christi IceRays (replaced by NAHL)				
2011–12	14	Bloomington Blaze	Bloomington Prairie Thunder; Bossier-Shreveport Mudbugs; Colorado Eagles (to ECHL); Mississippi RiverKings (to SPHL); Odessa Jackalopes (replaced by NAHL)				
2012–13	10	Denver Cutthroats	Evansville IceMen (to ECHL); Fort Wayne Komets (to ECHL); Dayton Gems; Rio Grande Valley Killer Bees	Laredo Bucks			Texas Brahmas → Fort Worth Brahmas
2013–14	10	Brampton Beast	Bloomington Blaze (to SPHL); Fort Worth Brahmas		Laredo Bucks	Laredo Bucks → St. Charles Chill	

== League champions ==
Central Hockey League champions
Season	Champion team
1992–93	Tulsa Oilers
1993–94	Wichita Thunder
1994–95	Wichita Thunder
1995–96	Oklahoma City Blazers
1996–97	Fort Worth Fire
1997–98	Columbus Cottonmouths
1998–99	Huntsville Channel Cats
1999–2000	Indianapolis Ice
2000–01	Oklahoma City Blazers
2001–02	Memphis RiverKings
2002–03	Memphis RiverKings
2003–04	Laredo Bucks
2004–05	Colorado Eagles
2005–06	Laredo Bucks
2006–07	Colorado Eagles
2007–08	Arizona Sundogs
2008–09	Texas Brahmas
2009–10	Rapid City Rush
2010–11	Bossier-Shreveport Mudbugs
2011–12	Fort Wayne Komets
2012–13	Allen Americans
2013–14	Allen Americans

== See also ==
- List of ice hockey leagues
- Sports league attendances
