= Amarillo Gorillas =

Ice hockey team

- City: Amarillo, Texas
- League: CHL
- Conference: Southern
- Founded: 1996 (WPHL)
- Operated: 1996–2010
- Home arena: Amarillo Civic Center
- Colors: Black, red, white
- Owner: Randy Sanders
- Media: KPUR (1440 AM)

Franchise history
- 1996–2002: Amarillo Rattlers
- 2002–2010: Amarillo Gorillas

The primary mark of the Amarillo Gorillas from 2002 to 2009

The Amarillo Gorillas were a minor league hockey team based in Amarillo, Texas, United States. The team was most recently affiliated with the now defunct Central Hockey League (CHL) from 2001–10. The Gorillas began play in 1996 as the Amarillo Rattlers in the Western Professional Hockey League (WPHL) until the WPHL was bought by the CHL in 2001. They continued to use the Rattlers name until an ownership change in 2002, composed of local businessmen Bill Tolliver, Gary Thach, Joe Gammesfelter, Daryl Felsberg, Kevin Moon, Jay Hedrick, and Shaughn Ogrady. As the Rattlers, the team frequently finished at the bottom of the WPHL and CHL divisions, but made the playoffs four straight years after becoming the Gorillas until the 2006–2007 season. The Gorillas played in the Amarillo Civic Center. The team's most recent head coach was Brian Pellerin.

On May 19, 2010, the Gorillas announced they had ceased operations. However, hockey would remain in Amarillo, as the North American Hockey League, a Junior A league affiliated with USA Hockey, named the Amarillo Bulls started play in the 2010–2011 season.

== Season records ==
=== Western Professional Hockey League ===
Season	W	L	OTL/SOL	Pts	Playoffs
1996–97	17	39	8	42	No playoffs
1997–98	25	32	12	62	No playoffs
1998–99	31	38	8	70	No playoffs
1999-00	21	41	8	50	No playoffs
2000–01	27	35	8	62	No playoffs

=== Central Hockey League ===
Season	W	L	OTL/SOL	Pts	Playoffs
2001–02	19	39	6	44	No playoffs
2002–03	39	23	2	80	Lost in quarterfinals
2003–04	37	24	3	77	Lost in semifinals
2004–05	31	20	9	71	Lost in semifinals
2005–06	35	26	3	73	Lost in quarterfinals
2006–07	32	28	4	68	Lost in quarterfinals
2007–08	22	32	10	54	No playoffs
2008–09	19	42	3	41	No playoffs
2009–10	21	34	9	51	No playoffs
