= El Paso Buzzards =

- City: El Paso, Texas
- League: WPHL; CHL
- Founded: 1996
- Home arena: El Paso County Coliseum
- Owner: Bill Davidson
- General manager: John Zang, Tommy Benezio
- Head coach: Trent Eigner, Craig Coxe

Franchise history
- 1996–2003: El Paso Buzzards

Championships
- Playoff championships: 2 (1996–97, 1997–98)

The El Paso Buzzards were a professional ice hockey team in El Paso, Texas, United States, and were members of the Western Professional Hockey League and Central Hockey League. They played their home games at El Paso County Coliseum.

The team was founded by Jim Burlew, Dave MacPherson and John Kettle, who brought in Rich Szturm to run the ice operations and start a youth hockey program for the city by converting the on-site Equestrian Centre at the Coliseum to a full-time NHL-sized rink. The team was one of the original members of the Western Professional Hockey League starting in 1996, winning the league's first two championships in the 1996–97 and 1997–98 seasons. Those teams were coached by Todd Brost, a former member of Canada's Olympic hockey team.

In 2000, the team was sold to West Texas Hockey Management Inc., headed by Bill Davidson.

In 2003, the Buzzards were the first former WPHL team to fold after the WPHL was bought by the Central Hockey League in 2001. During the team's final season, the players were locked out of its home arena after owner Bill Davidson failed to pay rent. By March 2003, the team declared bankruptcy after losing its radio deal and missing payroll causing the front office to resign. Davidson would also be charged with stealing 14 pairs of players' skates at the end of the season.

Hockey would not return to El Paso until the junior hockey team, the El Paso Rhinos, joined the Western States Hockey League as an expansion team in 2006.
