= Lubbock Cotton Kings =

Defunct American ice hockey team

- Sport: Ice hockey
- Founded: October 1999
- Folded: 2007
- League: WPHL (1999-2001); CHL (2001-2007)
- Location: Lubbock, Texas, USA
- Arena: City Bank Coliseum

The Lubbock Cotton Kings were a professional ice hockey team formerly based in Lubbock, Texas as members of the Western Professional Hockey League and the Central Hockey League. The team played home games at City Bank Coliseum.

== History ==
The Lubbock Cotton Kings played their first game in Lubbock Municipal Coliseum (later City Bank Coliseum) in October 1999. During the inaugural season, the Cotton Kings went 42–24–4 and lost in the second round of the Western Professional Hockey League (WPHL) playoffs. In the 2000–01 season, the Cotton Kings advanced to the WPHL Championship where they lost to the Bossier-Shreveport Mudbugs.

After the WPHL merged with the Central Hockey League, the team only made one playoff appearance in the 2004–05 season.

=== Suspended operations ===
In June 2007, after the Cotton Kings failed to reach an agreement with the city of Lubbock for use of City Bank Coliseum, the Central Hockey League announced that the Cotton Kings must take a year off, suspending operations for the 2007–08 season. The team attempted to return to Lubbock or move to San Angelo, Texas, however, this never happened and the CHL folded seven years later.
