= Fort Worth Brahmas =

- City: North Richland Hills, Texas
- League: Central Hockey League
- Conference: Berry
- Founded: 1997 (In the WPHL)
- Home arena: NYTEX Sports Centre
- Colors: Black, Purple

Franchise history
- 1997–2006: Fort Worth Brahmas
- 2007–2012: Texas Brahmas
- 2012–2013: Fort Worth Brahmas

Championships
- Regular season titles: 1997-98 Governors Cup Champions
- Division titles: 2007-08 Northeast Division Champs, 2008-09 Southeast Division Champs
- Conference titles: 2008-09 Southern Conference Champions
- Ray Miron President's Cup: 2008-09 Ray Miron President's Cup Champions

The Fort Worth Brahmas were a professional ice hockey team in the Central Hockey League, and previously the Western Professional Hockey League. The team originally played at the Fort Worth Convention Center but played their final six seasons, including their 2008–09 Championship season at the NYTEX Sports Centre. The CHL officially announced the team was going inactive on June 16, 2013.

== History ==
=== 1990s ===
Originally announced as the Fort Worth Bulls but forced to change their name after the Birmingham Bulls objected, the team began play in the Western Professional Hockey League as the Fort Worth Brahmas (named after Brahma bulls) while the CHL's Fort Worth Fire were still in operation. The Fire eventually ceased operations. The Fort Worth Brahmas played their home games at the Fort Worth Convention Center.

=== 2000s ===
Due to problems negotiating a lease with the Fort Worth Convention Center, the Brahmas announced on May 3, 2006, that they would suspend operations for the 2006–07 season. However, they returned for the 2007–08 season as the Texas Brahmas and began play in the NYTEX Sports Centre (formerly known as the Blue Line Ice Complex) in North Richland Hills, Texas. NYTEX Sports is owned by former Brahmas minority owners, Sal and Frank Trazzera.

Their first season in North Richland Hills proved to be very successful as they entered the postseason for the first time since the 2001–02 season. In the first round the Brahmas defeated the Mississippi RiverKings, then went on to sweep the Bossier-Shreveport Mudbugs in four games with David Cacciola in goal. In the Northern Conference Finals, the Brahmas took the series to Game 7 before losing to the defending champions, the Colorado Eagles.

In 2008–09, the Brahmas won the Southeast Division and defeated the Odessa Jackalopes in seven games to capture the Southern Conference Championship. The team then advanced to the Ray Miron President's Cup Finals to face the Colorado Eagles, whom they defeated in five games. The 2008–09 CHL Championship was the first by the Texas/Ft. Worth Brahmas franchise and the first for the Fort Worth area since the Fort Worth Fire won the 1996–97 CHL Governor's Cup.

The Brahmas lost in the playoffs of the 2009–10 season in a close 2–1 fifth game against the Odessa Jackalopes.

=== 2010s ===
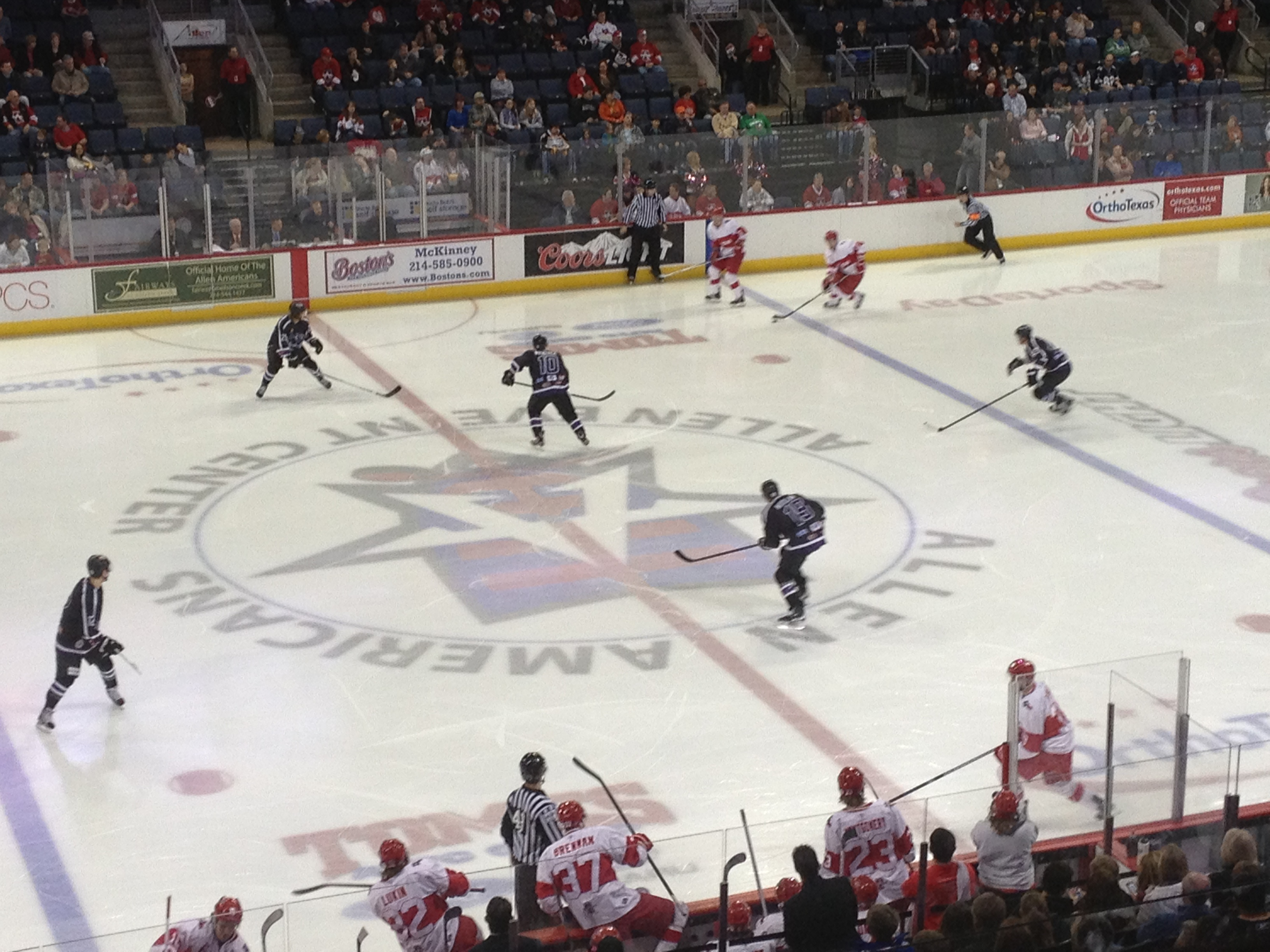
The Brahmas vs the Allen Americans at the Allen Event Center on January 11, 2013.

The 2010–2011 season for the Brahmas ended on a losing note in the first round of the playoffs against the Odessa Jackalopes in four games, three games to one.

Very shortly prior to the start of the 2012–2013 preseason, the team was sold to a Fort Worth-based investment group and returned to the Fort Worth Brahmas branding for the 2012–2013 season. The membership of investment group was still in flux when the season began and some of the big money contributors never officially came into the fold. The team struggled with financial issues throughout the season before the franchise went inactive for at least one season a second time.

After the franchise folded, the Texas Tornado of the North American Hockey League relocated to the Fort Worth suburb of North Richland Hills and became the Lone Star Brahmas and began play at the NYTEX Sports Centre beginning with the 2013–14 season.
