= Odessa Jackalopes (1997–2011) =

- City: Odessa, Texas
- League: Central Hockey League; Western Professional Hockey League
- Operated: 1997–2011
- Home arena: Ector County Coliseum
- Affiliates: New York Islanders (NHL); Bridgeport Sound Tigers (AHL)

Championships
- Regular season titles: 1 (2001–02)
- Division titles: 3 (2001–02, 2002–03, 2005–06)
- Conference titles: 1 (2001–02)
- Ray Miron President's Cup: None

The Odessa Jackalopes were a minor professional ice hockey team based in Odessa, Texas. The team played in the Central Hockey League (CHL), and was an affiliate of the New York Islanders. The Jackalopes played their home games at Ector County Coliseum.

All Jackalopes games were broadcast live on KMCM from the franchise's inaugural year until the 2009–10 season when KFZX took over the broadcasting rights to the live games and the Monday talk show called Hockey Talk.

== History ==
In October 1997, Odessa joined the Western Professional Hockey League (WPHL). In their first season the home games drew an average of 4,000 spectators. Over the next couple of seasons that number leveled off, and the team averaged just over 3,200 hockey fans each game. The team mascot, a jackalope, quickly became one of the most popular in hockey's minor leagues, and team merchandise featuring the snarling, antlered rabbit, has sold well throughout the United States and Canada.

=== Leagues ===
The Jackalopes continued playing in the WPHL until 2001, when the league merged with the Central Hockey League. Beginning with the 2001–02 season, the Jackalopes played in the CHL.

On March 23, 2011, the ownership group confirmed that they would be leaving the CHL and joining the North American Hockey League (NAHL), by purchasing an existing NAHL franchise and moving it to Odessa and adopting the same name.

== Captains ==
Captain - Sébastien Thinel
Alternate - Philippe Plante
Alternate - Mike Ramsay

Note: Thinel named as captain replacing injured David van Drunen & Ramsay named alternate.
