= Austin Ice Bats =

Defunct ice hockey team in Austin, Texas, US

- City: Austin, Texas
- League: Western Professional Hockey League Central Hockey League
- Conference: South Division 25-26
- Founded: 1996
- Home arena: Travis County Expo Center (Luedecke Arena) 1996–2006, Chaparral Ice 2006–2008
- Colors: Purple, red, yellow, white, black
- Head coach: Blaine Stoughton 96-99, Brent Hughes 99-08
- Affiliates: Minnesota Wild (NHL); Houston Aeros (AHL)

Franchise history
- 1996–2001: Austin Ice Bats (WPHL)
- 2001–2008: Austin Ice Bats (CHL)

The Austin Ice Bats were a professional minor league ice hockey team based in Austin, Texas, from 1996 to 2008. They were originally members of the Western Professional Hockey League (WPHL) and later the Central Hockey League (CHL). The team was named for the Mexican free-tailed bats (Tadarida brasiliensis) that nest under the Ann W. Richards Congress Avenue Bridge in the city.

== History ==
The team was established in 1996 and played home games in Luedecke Arena at the Travis County Exposition Center, a multi-purpose building that was furnished with skating ice and dubbed the "Bat Cave" for the games. The team was originally a member of the Western Professional Hockey League (WPHL). The Ice Bats joined several other WPHL teams in a merger with the Central Hockey League (CHL) in 2001. The Ice Bats finished first in their division in both the 2001–02 and 2002–03 season, making it to the championship game and losing to the Memphis RiverKings both times.

On February 15, 2006, the Ice Bats left the Travis County Exposition Center and relocated to Chaparral Ice, near Austin's northeast border with neighboring Pflugerville. They cited scheduling conflicts at the Expo Center as the main reason for the move. Chaparral Ice proved to be an unsuccessful venue and seated only 500 fans. For the 2006–07 season, they were affiliated with the Minnesota Wild of the National Hockey League and the Houston Aeros of the American Hockey League. The team was coached by former National Hockey League player Brent Hughes from 1999 to 2003, and again from 2007 to 2008.

In May 2008, the team announced it was leaving Austin due to lack of fan support at Chaparral Ice center, which had a maximum seating capacity of 500. Anticipated competition with the announced Texas Stars of the AHL was also cited as a factor. The team attempted to relocate to Ford Arena in Beaumont, Texas, for the 2008–09 season, but was unsuccessful.

In 2021, a new junior team was launched using the Ice Bats' name in the North American 3 Hockey League. The team currently plays at the Ice And Field in Cedar Park Texas, and also operates the Austin Jr Ice Bats youth hockey program with teams from 8U to 16U.

== Media ==
Throughout the franchise's history, the Ice Bats had three play-by-play announcers: Mark "Space Wrangler" Martello, Glen "Sharky" Norman, and Brian "Sun" Rea. Bob "The Blimp" Fonseca was the team's first PA announcer. Philip "Dollar" Billnitzer covered the Bats for the Austin-American Statesman during the inaugural season, and continued to cover them for CitySearch.com for two more seasons.
