= New Mexico Scorpions =

- City: Rio Rancho, New Mexico
- League: Western Professional Hockey League
- Conference: Southern Conference
- Division: Southwest Division
- Operated: 1996–2005; 2006–2009
- Home arena: Santa Ana Star Center
- Colors: Red, Black, Gold

Championships
- Regular season titles: 1 (1996)
- Division titles: 1 (2007)
- Conference titles: None
- Ray Miron President's Cup: None

The New Mexico Scorpions were a Central Hockey League (CHL) team located in Rio Rancho, New Mexico. The team was established in 1996 as a part of the Western Professional Hockey League (WPHL). In 2001, the WPHL merged with the CHL. On July 2, 2009, the Scorpions ceased operations.

The Scorpions' home arena during their WPHL and early CHL days was the Tingley Coliseum in Albuquerque, New Mexico. The team suspended operations for the 2005-06 season, then moved to the new Santa Ana Star Center, in the neighbouring city of Rio Rancho, for the 2006-07 season.

The Scorpions finished at the top of the WPHL standings for their initial 1996–97 season, winning the inaugural Governor's Cup as regular season champion. The team had limited success in playoff/championship play. They made it to the WPHL championship finals in the 1999–00 season, losing to the Shreveport Mudbugs in six games. In the 2006–07 CHL season, the Scorpions won the Southwest Division playoffs, then lost the Southern Conference Championship series to the Laredo Bucks.

The Scorpions' mascot was named Stanley.

The owners included former National Hockey League players Dave Ellett Joe Murphy and Brian Savage. The team's last coach was Randy Murphy.
