= Joe Burton Award =

The Joe Burton Award was awarded annually to the Central Hockey League's (CHL) scoring champion. The award was named after the CHL's career point leader, Joe Burton, who accumulated 985 points in 11 seasons with the Oklahoma City Blazers. The award was named after Burton starting in the 2003–04 season.

== List of winners ==
Season	Player	Position	Team	Point Total
1992–93	Sylvain Fleury	Centre	Oklahoma City Blazers	101
1993–94	Paul Jackson	Centre	Wichita Thunder	135
1994–95	Brian Shantz	Centre	San Antonio Iguanas	119
1995–96	Brian Shantz (2)	Centre	San Antonio Iguanas	139
1996–97	Trevor Jobe	Centre	Wichita Thunder	125
1997–98	Luc Beausoleil	Right wing	Tulsa Oilers	127
1998–99	Derek Grant	Centre	Memphis Riverkings	123
1999–00	Chris MacKenzie	Centre	Indianapolis Ice	127
2000–01	Yvan Corbin	Left wing	Indianapolis Ice	129
2001–02	Dan Price	Right wing	Austin Ice Bats	97
2002–03	Don Parsons	Right wing	Memphis Riverkings	106
2003–04	Jeff Bes	Centre	Laredo Bucks	117
2004–05	Jason Duda	Left wing	Wichita Thunder	96
2005–06	Derek Hahn	Centre	Amarillo Gorillas	114
2008–07	Jeff Christian	Left wing	Youngstown Steelhounds	116
2007–08	Alex Leavitt	Centre	Arizona Sundogs	128
2008–09	Sebastien Thinel	Right wing	Odessa Jackalopes	97
2009–10	Kevin Ulanski	Forward	Colorado Eagles	109
2010–11	Sebastien Thinel (2)	Right wing	Odessa Jackalopes	110

source: Central Hockey League Historical Award Winners
