= 1997–98 Wichita Thunder season =

The 1997–98 Wichita Thunder season was the sixth season of the CHL franchise in Wichita, Kansas.

The Thunder won the 1997–98 CHL Western Conference Champions, but were swept in the finals by the Columbus Cottonmouths.

== Regular season ==
=== Division standings ===
Western Division	GP	W	L	T	GF	GA	Pts
x-Oklahoma City Blazers	70	48	19	3	319	237	99
x-Wichita Thunder	70	35	31	4	302	303	74
x-Tulsa Oilers	70	34	31	5	308	274	73
x-Memphis RiverKings	70	25	40	5	239	287	55
e-Fort Worth Fire	70	13	53	4	214	397	30

y - clinched league title; x - clinched playoff spot; e - eliminated from playoff contention

== Player statistics ==
Regular season

Player	GP	G	A	Pts	+/−	PIM
Jim McGeough	68	38	39	77	-	78
Cory Dosdall	65	33	39	72	-	261
David Beauregard	57	42	29	71	-	86
Cam Plante	67	8	62	70	-	112
Jason Duda	60	32	33	65	-	62
Tyler Rice	61	35	27	62	-	176
Travis Clayton	70	27	35	62	-	84
Brian Stacey	37	18	20	38	-	63
Craig Coxe	31	9	29	38	-	75
Steve Magnusson	39	10	22	32	-	78
Eddy Marchant	43	12	16	28	-	129
Jude Boulianne	33	4	20	24	-	22
Sean O'Reilly	53	3	21	24	-	195
Dan Delisle	60	5	16	21	-	108
Curtis Voth	60	8	12	20	-	267
Clint Black	34	8	11	19	-	33
Chris Dashney	34	1	15	16	-	45
Todd Newton	22	3	4	7	-	56
Phil Daigle	6	1	5	6	-	2
Jeff Beaudin	23	1	5	6	-	62
Mike Flanagan	34	0	6	6	-	72
Evgeni Feldman	10	2	3	5	-	4
Joel Boschman	8	0	4	4	-	9
Vernon Beardy	15	0	3	3	-	9
Vinnie Jonasson	12	1	1	2	-	6
Pierre Lindahl	18	0	2	2	-	81
Rob Friesen	12	2	1	3	0	0
Blake Sheane	4	1	0	1	-	10
Jay Dobrescu	6	0	1	1	-	11
Todd Johnson	0	0	0	0	-	0
Jeff Salajko	0	0	0	0	-	0
Brian Langlot	1	0	0	0	-	0
Jody Lehman	2	0	0	0	-	0
Craig Lochhead	2	0	0	0	-	0
Andy Adams	3	0	0	0	-	2
Ray DeSouza	4	0	0	0	-	18
Mike Hiebert	4	0	0	0	-	11
Hugo Hamelin	30	0	0	0	-	20

Note: GP = Games played; G = Goals; A = Assists; Pts = Points; +/− = Plus/Minus; PIM = Penalty Minutes

== Awards ==
Regular Season
Player	Award
David Beauregard	CHL Rookie of the Year

== See also ==
- 1997–98 CHL season
