= 1993–94 Wichita Thunder season =

1993–94 Wichita Thunder
- William Levins Memorial Cup champions
- League: 1st CHL
- 1993–94 record: 40-18-6
- Goals for: 309
- Goals against: 275

Team information
- General manager: Bill Shuck
- Coach: Doug Shedden
- Arena: Britt Brown Arena
- Average attendance: 6032

Team leaders
- Goals: Paul Jackson (71)
- Assists: Ron Handy (80)
- Points: Paul Jackson (135)
- Penalty minutes: Greg Neish (325)
- Wins: Robert Desjardins (38)
- Goals against average: Robert Desjardins (4.00)

The 1993–94 Wichita Thunder season was the second season of the CHL franchise in Wichita, Kansas. The season was pivotal for the Wichita Thunder, which went "from worst to first" in the league, winning both the regular season and post-season titles. It was the first CHL club to do so since the Indianapolis Checkers in 1982–1983. The team swept the championship series, winning all 4 games against the Tulsa Oilers. Paul Jackson finished as the league's leading scorer; Ron Handy was the play-off MVP; and goaltender Bobby Desjardins was MVP for the league.

== Regular season ==
=== League standings ===
Central Hockey League	GP	W	L	T	GF	GA	Pts
y-Wichita Thunder	64	40	18	6	309	275	86
x-Tulsa Oilers	64	36	24	4	347	281	76
x-Oklahoma City Blazers	64	35	23	6	260	246	76
x-Dallas Freeze	64	31	25	8	304	309	70
e-Memphis RiverKings	64	25	34	5	243	294	55
e-Fort Worth Fire	64	25	37	2	253	311	52

Note: y - clinched league title; x - clinched playoff spot; e - eliminated from playoff contention

== Awards ==
Regular Season
Player	Award
Doug Shedden	CHL Coach of the Year
Paul Jackson	Ken McKenzie Trophy
Robert Desjardins	CHL Most Valuable Player

Playoffs
Player	Award
Ron Handy	CHL Playoff Most Valuable Player

== See also ==
- 1993–94 CHL season
