= Igors Bondarevs =

Latvian ice hockey player

- Born: February 9, 1974 (age 51); Riga, Soviet Union
- Height: 6 ft 0 in (183 cm)
- Weight: 190 lb (86 kg; 13 st 8 lb)
- Position: Defence
- Shot: Left
- Played for: Pardaugava Riga; Birmingham Bulls; Dallas Freeze; Fort Worth Fire; Huntsville Channel Cats; Las Vegas Thunder; Jokipojat; Kärpät; Huntsville Tornado; SaiPa; HC Slovan Bratislava; Torpedo Nizhny Novgorod; Colorado Eagles; HK Riga 2000; ASK Ogre; Yunost Minsk; AaB Ishockey; KS Cracovia
- National team: Latvia
- NHL draft: Undrafted
- Playing career: 1992–2010

Igors Anatolyevich Bondarevs (born February 9, 1974, in Riga, Soviet Union) is a Latvian professional former ice hockey player.

He represented Latvia at four IIHF World Championships and the 2002 Winter Olympics.

== Career statistics ==
=== Regular season and playoffs ===
			Regular season					Playoffs
Season	Team	League	GP	G	A	Pts	PIM	GP	G	A	Pts	PIM
1990–91	RASMS Rīga	URS.3	3	0	0	0	0	—	—	—	—	—
1991–92	Pārdaugava–2 Rīga	LAT	15	11	7	18	14	—	—	—	—	—
1991–92	RASMS Rīga	CIS.3	36	6	9	15	14	—	—	—	—	—
1992–93	Pārdaugava Rīga	LAT	10	5	4	9	8	—	—	—	—	—
1992–93	Pārdaugava Rīga	RUS	37	3	1	4	12	2	0	0	0	0
1993–94	Pārdaugava Rīga	RUS	42	5	8	13	28	2	0	0	0	0
1994–95	Birmingham Bulls	ECHL	3	0	1	1	0	—	—	—	—	—
1994–95	Dallas Freeze	CHL	9	1	9	10	12	—	—	—	—	—
1994–95	Fort Worth Fire	CHL	41	5	19	24	32	—	—	—	—	—
1995–96	Huntsville Channel Cats	SHL	54	16	28	44	32	10	3	8	11	2
1996–97	Huntsville Channel Cats	CHL	60	38	53	91	26	9	1	12	13	0
1997–98	Huntsville Channel Cats	CHL	68	23	61	84	63	3	2	1	3	2
1998–99	Las Vegas Thunder	IHL	3	0	0	0	0	—	—	—	—	—
1998–99	Huntsville Channel Cats	CHL	64	26	78	104	86	15	5	11	16	12
1999–2000	Jokipojat	FIN.2	25	7	14	21	16	—	—	—	—	—
1999–2000	Kärpät	FIN.2	17	1	5	6	12	7	1	3	4	4
2000–01	Huntsville Tornado	CHL	67	13	41	54	53	—	—	—	—	—
2001–02	SaiPa	SM-l	10	0	3	3	6	—	—	—	—	—
2001–02	HC Slovan Bratislava	SVK	2	0	0	0	0	—	—	—	—	—
2001–02	Fort Wayne Komets	UHL	25	3	14	17	10	—	—	—	—	—
2002–03	Torpedo Nizhny Novgorod	RUS.2	44	10	16	26	30	14	1	7	8	6
2002–03	Torpedo–2 Nizhny Novgorod	RUS.3	2	0	0	0	6	—	—	—	—	—
2003–04	Colorado Eagles	CHL	52	10	23	33	20	4	0	2	2	4
2004–05	Torpedo Nizhny Novgorod	RUS.2	46	4	4	8	30	8	0	2	2	2
2005–06	Amur Khabarovsk	RUS.2	12	1	1	2	18	—	—	—	—	—
2005–06	HK Rīga 2000	BLR	23	3	5	8	38	6	0	4	4	20
2005–06	HK Rīga 2000	LAT		0	0	0	4	—	—	—	—	—
2006–07	ASK/Ogre	LAT	15	2	4	6	30	—	—	—	—	—
2006–07	Yunost Minsk	BLR	4	0	0	0	2	—	—	—	—	—
2006–07	AaB Ishockey	DEN	17	1	11	12	22	17	5	10	15	36
2007–08	AaB Ishockey	DEN	44	2	20	22	58	2	0	0	0	14
2008–09	HK Rīga 2000	BLR	35	4	11	15	54	—	—	—	—	—
2008–09	Cracovia Krakow	POL	1	0	1	1	0	—	—	—	—	—
2009–10	Cracovia Krakow	POL	47	3	15	18	32	9	0	2	2	4
RUS totals			79	8	9	17	40	4	0	0	0	0
CHL totals			361	116	284	400	292	31	8	26	34	18

=== International ===
Year	Team	Event	GP	G	A	Pts	PIM
1993	Latvia	OGQ	4	0	2	2	2
1994	Latvia	WJC C	4	3	7	10	12
1994	Latvia	WC B	7	2	2	4	4
1995	Latvia	WC B	7	1	3	4	0
1997	Latvia	WC	8	1	2	3	6
1998	Latvia	WC	6	0	1	1	0
1999	Latvia	WC Q	3	0	0	0	0
2000	Latvia	WC	7	0	0	0	6
2001	Latvia	OGQ	3	0	0	0	2
2002	Latvia	OG	4	2	2	4	0
2002	Latvia	WC	6	0	1	1	2
2005	Latvia	OGQ	3	0	0	0	0
Senior totals			58	6	13	19	22
