= 1996–97 Wichita Thunder season =

1996–97 Wichita Thunder
- Conference: 4th Western
- 1996–97 record: 25-31-10
- Goals for: 279
- Goals against: 324

Team information
- General manager: Bill Shuck
- Coach: Bryan Wells
- Arena: Britt Brown Arena
- Average attendance: 4834

Team leaders
- Goals: Trevor Jobe (56)
- Assists: Trevor Jobe (69)
- Points: Trevor Jobe (125)
- Penalty minutes: Dan Kopec (365)
- Wins: Kevin St. Pierre (7); Brian Langlot

The 1996–97 Wichita Thunder season was the fifth season of the CHL franchise in Wichita, Kansas.

== Regular season ==
=== Division standings ===
Western Division	GP	W	L	SOL	GF	GA	Pts
y-Oklahoma City Blazers	66	48	12	6	307	200	102
x-Fort Worth Fire	66	43	16	5	279	210	95
x-Tulsa Oilers	66	30	32	4	286	284	64
x-Wichita Thunder	66	25	31	10	279	324	60
e-San Antonio Iguanas	66	26	36	4	261	326	56

Note: y - clinched league title; x - clinched playoff spot; e - eliminated from playoff contention

== Awards ==
Regular Season
Player	Award	Awarded
Cory Dosdall	CHL Rookie of the Year	March 24, 1997

== Transactions ==
The Thunder were involved in the following transactions during the 1996–97 season.

Trades

December 19, 1996	To Oklahoma City Blazers: Dave Shute	To Wichita: Jason Duda

== See also ==
- 1996–97 CHL season
