= Jim McGeough =

Canadian ice hockey player

- Born: April 13, 1963 (age 63) Regina, Saskatchewan, Canada
- Height: 5 ft 10 in (178 cm)
- Weight: 181 lb (82 kg; 12 st 13 lb)
- Position: Center
- Shot: Left
- Played for: Washington Capitals; Pittsburgh Penguins; Bracknell Bees; Klagenfurter AC
- NHL draft: 110th overall, 1981; Washington Capitals
- Playing career: 1981–2004

James McGeough (born April 13, 1963) is a Canadian retired professional ice hockey player. He played 57 games in the National Hockey League with the Washington Capitals and Pittsburgh Penguins between 1981 and 1987. The rest of his career, which lasted from 1981 to 2004, was spent in various minor leagues. McGeough was selected by the Capitals in the 1981 NHL entry draft. His brother, Mick McGeough, was a referee in the NHL.

== Career statistics ==
=== Regular season and playoffs ===
			Regular season					Playoffs
Season	Team	League	GP	G	A	Pts	PIM	GP	G	A	Pts	PIM
1979–80	Regina Pats	WHL	10	1	4	5	2	5	2	0	2	0
1980–81	Regina Pats	WHL	4	1	2	3	2	—	—	—	—	—
1980–81	Billings Bighorns	WHL	67	49	42	91	139	5	2	5	7	15
1981–82	Washington Capitals	NHL	4	0	0	0	0	—	—	—	—	—
1981–82	Billings Bighorns	WHL	71	93	66	159	142	5	2	1	3	4
1982–83	Nanaimo Islanders	WHL	72	76	56	132	126	—	—	—	—	—
1982–83	Hershey Bears	AHL	5	1	1	2	10	5	0	2	2	25
1983–84	Hershey Bears	AHL	79	40	36	76	108	—	—	—	—	—
1984–85	Washington Capitals	NHL	11	3	0	3	12	—	—	—	—	—
1984–85	Pittsburgh Penguins	NHL	14	0	4	4	4	—	—	—	—	—
1984–85	Binghamton Whalers	AHL	57	32	21	53	26	—	—	—	—	—
1985–86	Pittsburgh Penguins	NHL	17	3	2	5	8	—	—	—	—	—
1985–86	Baltimore Skipjacks	AHL	38	14	13	27	20	—	—	—	—	—
1986–87	Pittsburgh Penguins	NHL	11	1	4	5	8	—	—	—	—	—
1986–87	Baltimore Skipjacks	AHL	45	18	19	37	37	—	—	—	—	—
1986–87	Muskegon Lumberjacks	IHL	18	13	15	28	6	15	14	8	22	10
1987–88	Springfield Indians	AHL	30	11	13	24	28	—	—	—	—	—
1987–88	Klagenfurt AC	AUT	34	34	18	52	52	—	—	—	—	—
1988–89	Klagenfurt AC	AUT	44	28	24	52	0	—	—	—	—	—
1989–90	Phoenix Roadrunners	IHL	77	35	46	81	90	—	—	—	—	—
1990–91	Kalamazoo Wings	IHL	7	0	0	0	2	—	—	—	—	—
1990–91	San Diego Gulls	IHL	10	2	4	6	4	—	—	—	—	—
1990–91	Albany Choppers	IHL	12	9	3	12	4	—	—	—	—	—
1990–91	Nashville Knights	ECHL	4	2	1	3	0	—	—	—	—	—
1991–92	Richmond Renegades	ECHL	24	16	12	28	34	7	0	2	2	8
1991–92	Bracknell Bees	BHL	12	15	9	24	20	—	—	—	—	—
1992–93	Richmond Renegades	ECHL	39	14	27	41	66	—	—	—	—	—
1992–93	St. Petersburg Renegades	SuHL	19	17	14	31	36	—	—	—	—	—
1993–94	Richmond Renegades	ECHL	26	10	8	18	10	—	—	—	—	—
1993–94	Dallas Freeze	CHL	28	21	16	37	24	7	3	5	8	8
1994–95	Dallas Freeze	CHL	66	50	50	100	38	—	—	—	—	—
1995–96	Wichita Thunder	CHL	31	11	20	31	16	—	—	—	—	—
1995–96	Reno Renegades	WCHL	15	4	10	14	4	—	—	—	—	—
1996–97	Wichita Thunder	CHL	21	6	20	26	4	9	9	2	11	8
1997–98	Wichita Thunder	CHL	68	38	39	77	78	15	10	9	19	10
1998–99	Wichita Thunder	CHL	27	18	22	40	24	4	1	3	4	6
1999–00	Wichita Thunder	CHL	37	12	13	25	30	5	1	1	2	4
2000–01	Lubbock Cotton Kings	WPHL	59	14	30	44	46	12	0	1	1	2
2003–04	Trois-Rivières Viking	QSMHL	4	0	0	0	2	—	—	—	—	—
NHL totals			57	7	10	17	32	—	—	—	—	—
