= 1994–95 Wichita Thunder season =

1994–95 Wichita Thunder
- William Levins Memorial Cup champions
- League: 1st CHL
- 1994–95 record: 44-18-4
- Goals for: 320
- Goals against: 268

Team information
- General manager: Bill Shuck
- Coach: Doug Shedden
- Arena: Britt Brown Arena
- Average attendance: 6525

Team leaders
- Goals: Bob Berg (55)
- Assists: Dave Doucette (70)
- Points: Bob Berg (101)
- Penalty minutes: Greg Neish (337)
- Wins: George Maneluk (44)
- Goals against average: George Maneluk (3.76)

The 1994–95 Wichita Thunder season was the third season of the CHL franchise in Wichita, Kansas. The Thunder successfully defended its regular season title, setting a CHL record for winning percentage (.697). In the playoffs, the Wichita Thunder successfully defended their title, defeating the San Antonio Iguanas 4–3 in the championship series. Ron Handy once again was awarded play-off MVP.

== Regular season ==
=== League standings ===
Central Hockey League	GP	W	L	T	GF	GA	Pts
y-Wichita Thunder	66	44	18	4	320	268	92
x-San Antonio Iguanas	66	37	22	7	336	281	81
x-Tulsa Oilers	66	36	24	6	307	281	78
x-Oklahoma City Blazers	66	34	23	9	274	267	77
e-Fort Worth Fire	66	32	26	8	314	288	72
e-Memphis Riverkings	66	24	35	7	259	327	55
e-Dallas Freeze	66	24	36	6	266	364	54

Note: y - clinched league title; x - clinched playoff spot; e - eliminated from playoff contention

== Awards ==
Playoffs
Player	Award
Ron Handy	CHL Playoff Most Valuable Player

== See also ==
- 1994–95 CHL season
