= Craig Coxe =

American ice hockey player (born 1964)

- Born: January 21, 1964 (age 62) Chula Vista, California, U.S.
- Height: 6 ft 4 in (193 cm)
- Weight: 220 lb (100 kg; 15 st 10 lb)
- Position: Center
- Shot: Left
- Played for: Vancouver Canucks; Calgary Flames; St. Louis Blues; San Jose Sharks
- NHL draft: 66th overall, 1982; Detroit Red Wings
- Playing career: 1984–2000

Craig Raymond Coxe (born January 21, 1964) is an American former professional ice hockey player. In addition to playing in the National Hockey League (NHL) with the Vancouver Canucks, Calgary Flames, St. Louis Blues, and the San Jose Sharks. Coxe also played two seasons of major league roller hockey in the RHI, after having grown up playing hockey in Tucson, Arizona, from 1969 to 1975 and in Laguna Beach, California. He lives in the suburbs of Saint Ignace, Michigan.

== Playing career ==
Coxe was selected in fourth round (66th overall) in the 1982 NHL entry draft by the Detroit Red Wings. Unable to come to terms with Detroit, he became an unrestricted free agent after the 1983–84 season and signed with the Vancouver Canucks.

Coxe played for four different NHL teams over eight seasons in the NHL. Best known as an enforcer, Coxe played in 235 NHL regular season games, scoring 45 points and receiving 713 minutes in penalties. Coxe was suspended for the first three games of the 1987–88 NHL season for leaving the penalty box to fight Joe Paterson during a pre-season game against the Los Angeles Kings.

While perhaps best remembered as a member of the Vancouver Canucks, Coxe was claimed from the Canucks by the San Jose Sharks in the 1991 NHL Dispersal and Expansion Drafts and, on October 4, 1991, he scored the first goal in the Sharks' franchise history. It was the next-to-last goal that he scored in the NHL.

== Coxe vs. Probert ==
Coxe was known as a willing fighter at the NHL level. Coxe's fights with Bob Probert are considered classics and have been referred to as "two of the biggest toe to toe slugfests of all time".

== Coaching career ==
During the 1999–00 season, his final year as a player, Coxe was playing with the San Antonio Iguanas in the CHL. Before the season's end, Coxe was named the assistant coach for the team. The following season Coxe was named head coach of the CHL's Huntsville Tornado. Coxe was also the head coach of the CHL's El Paso Buzzards for their final season in 2002–03. During this season, the team's owner, Bill Davidson, had declared bankruptcy. Despite not being paid for over a month, and even though at times he was able to dress only 9 or 10 players, Coxe continued to coach the team to the season's end. He is currently the head hockey coach at Cheboygan Area High School in Cheboygan, Michigan. He is also the rink manager at the Ralph G. Cantile Arena in Cheboygan.

== Personal life ==
Coxe is a native of Chula Vista, California. He also loves to play golf at his local country club in St. Ignace.

== Career statistics ==
=== Regular season and playoffs ===
			Regular season					Playoffs
Season	Team	League	GP	G	A	Pts	PIM	GP	G	A	Pts	PIM
1981–82	St. Albert Saints	AJHL	51	17	48	65	212	—	—	—	—	—
1982–83	Belleville Bulls	OHL	64	14	27	41	102	4	1	2	3	2
1983–84	Belleville Bulls	OHL	45	17	28	45	90	3	2	0	2	4
1984–85	Vancouver Canucks	NHL	9	0	0	0	49	—	—	—	—	—
1984–85	Fredericton Express	AHL	62	8	7	15	242	4	2	1	3	16
1985–86	Vancouver Canucks	NHL	57	3	5	8	176	3	0	0	0	2
1986–87	Vancouver Canucks	NHL	15	1	0	1	31	—	—	—	—	—
1986–87	Fredericton Express	AHL	46	1	12	13	168	—	—	—	—	—
1987–88	Vancouver Canucks	NHL	64	5	12	17	186	—	—	—	—	—
1987–88	Calgary Flames	NHL	7	2	3	5	32	2	1	0	1	16
1988–89	St. Louis Blues	NHL	41	0	7	7	127	—	—	—	—	—
1988–89	Peoria Rivermen	IHL	8	2	7	9	38	—	—	—	—	—
1989–90	Vancouver Canucks	NHL	25	1	4	5	66	—	—	—	—	—
1989–90	Milwaukee Admirals	IHL	5	0	5	5	4	—	—	—	—	—
1990–91	Vancouver Canucks	NHL	7	0	0	0	27	—	—	—	—	—
1990–91	Milwaukee Admirals	IHL	36	9	21	30	116	6	3	2	5	22
1991–92	San Jose Sharks	NHL	10	2	0	2	19	—	—	—	—	—
1991–92	Kansas City Blades	IHL	51	17	21	38	106	—	—	—	—	—
1991–92	Kalamazoo Wings	IHL	6	4	5	9	13	10	2	4	6	37
1992–93	Kalamazoo Wings	IHL	12	1	1	2	8	—	—	—	—	—
1992–93	Cincinnati Cyclones	IHL	20	5	3	8	34	—	—	—	—	—
1993–94	Tulsa Oilers	CHL	64	26	57	83	236	11	4	9	13	38
1994–95	Tulsa Oilers	CHL	12	7	7	14	28	7	0	1	1	30
1995–96	Huntsville Channel Cats	SHL	20	7	13	20	56	10	8	13	21	33
1996–97	Tulsa Oilers	CHL	64	29	59	88	95	5	2	2	4	8
1997–98	Tulsa Oilers	CHL	25	11	22	33	34	—	—	—	—	—
1997–98	Wichita Thunder	CHL	31	9	29	38	75	15	1	10	11	62
1998–99	Corpus Christi Icerays	WPHL	53	10	30	40	44	4	1	1	2	6
1999–00	San Antonio Iguanas	CHL	20	1	5	6	33	—	—	—	—	—
NHL totals			235	14	31	45	713	5	1	0	1	18
