= 2000–01 Wichita Thunder season =

The 2000–01 Wichita Thunder season was the ninth season of the CHL franchise in Wichita, Kansas. The team failed to qualify for post-season games.

== Regular season ==
=== Division standings ===
Western Division	GP	W	L	T	GF	GA	Pts
Oklahoma City Blazers	70	48	19	3	273	185	99
San Antonio Iguanas	70	42	21	7	288	229	91
Topeka Scarecrows	69	38	23	8	256	245	84
Tulsa Oilers	70	36	26	8	259	250	80
Wichita Thunder	70	30	32	8	251	251	68
Border City Bandits	51	11	36	4	132	283	26

== See also ==
- 2000–01 CHL season
