= List of Central Hockey League seasons =

This is a list of seasons of the Central Hockey League since its inception.

No.	Season	No. of teams	Reg. season games	Top record	Champion
1	1992–93	6	60	Oklahoma City Blazers (39–18–3)	Tulsa Oilers
2	1993–94	6	64	Wichita Thunder (40–18–6)	Wichita Thunder
3	1994–95	7	66	Wichita Thunder (44–18–4)	Wichita Thunder
4	1995–96	6	64	Oklahoma City Blazers (47–13–4)	Oklahoma City Blazers
5	1996–97	10	66	Oklahoma City Blazers (48–12–6)	Fort Worth Fire
6	1997–98	10	70	Columbus Cottonmouths (51–13–6)	Columbus Cottonmouths
7	1998–99	11	70	Oklahoma City Blazers (49–19–2)	Huntsville Channel Cats
8	1999–00	11	70	Fayetteville Force (45–22–3)	Indianapolis Ice
9	2000–01	12	70	Oklahoma City Blazers (48–19–3)	Oklahoma City Blazers
10	2001–02	16	64	Odessa Jackalopes (47–11–6)	Memphis RiverKings
11	2002–03	16	64	Austin Ice Bats (46–14–4)	Memphis RiverKings
12	2003–04	17	64	Laredo Bucks (48–8–8)	Laredo Bucks
13	2004–05	17	60	Colorado Eagles (43–10–7)	Colorado Eagles
14	2005–06	15	64	Colorado Eagles (44–14–6)	Laredo Bucks
15	2006–07	17	64	Bossier-Shreveport Mudbugs (44–14–6)	Colorado Eagles
16	2007–08	17	64	Bossier-Shreveport Mudbugs (44–14–6)	Arizona Sundogs
17	2008–09	16	64	Colorado Eagles (45–15–4)	Texas Brahmas
18	2009–10	15	64	Odessa Jackalopes (48–11–5)	Rapid City Rush
19	2010–11	18	66	Allen Americans (47–16–3)	Bossier-Shreveport Mudbugs
20	2011–12	14	66	Wichita Thunder (44–19–3)	Fort Wayne Komets
21	2012–13	10	66	Allen Americans (39–18–9)	Allen Americans
22	2013–14	10	66	Missouri Mavericks (44–20–2)	Allen Americans
