= Sean O'Reilly (ice hockey) =

Canadian ice hockey player and coach

Sean O'Reilly is a former professional ice hockey coach and player. He was the interim coach for the Wichita Thunder for only one game after James Latos was fired mid-season. O'Reilly won the only game he coached.

== Career statistics ==
			Regular season					Playoffs
Season	Team	League	GP	G	A	Pts	PIM	GP	G	A	Pts	PIM
1989-90	Belleville Bulls	OHL	56	1	19	20	118	11	0	0	0	17
1990-91	Belleville Bulls	OHL	56	5	43	48	147	6	1	2	3	27
1991-92	London Knights	OHL	64	9	36	45	152	10	2	12	14	12
1997-98	Wichita Thunder	CHL	53	3	21	24	195	15	2	5	7	60
1998-99	Wichita Thunder	CHL	67	8	23	31	253	4	0	2	2	18
1999-2000	Wichita Thunder	CHL	58	4	33	37	104	5	0	3	3	14
2000-01	Wichita Thunder	CHL	70	4	42	46	217	—	—	—	—	—
2001-02	Wichita Thunder	CHL	63	8	23	31	157	—	—	—	—	—
