= 2007–08 Wichita Thunder season =

2007–08 Wichita Thunder
- Division: Northwest
- Conference: Northern
- 2007–08 record: 20-42-2
- Home record: 16-16-0
- Road record: 4-26-2
- Goals for: 156
- Goals against: 247

Team information
- General manager: Chris Presson
- Coach: Rob Weingartner
- Assistant coach: Rob Boyle
- Captain: Jason Duda
- Arena: Britt Brown Arena
- Average attendance: 5,949

Team leaders
- Goals: Bruce Richardson (16); Travis Clayton
- Assists: Bruce Richardson (41)
- Points: Bruce Richardson (57)
- Penalty minutes: Kyle Bruce (247)
- Plus/minus: Tyler Hanchuck (+2)
- Wins: Sebastien Laplante (10)

The 2007–08 Wichita Thunder season was the 16th season of the CHL franchise in Wichita, Kansas. After a 4–13 start to the season, Thunder president Chris Presson replaced coach Mark French with former Thunder player Rob Weingartner as interim coach. Finishing 20–42–2, it was the worst season in Wichita Thunder history.

== Regular season ==
=== Conference standings ===
| Northern Conference | GP | W | L | OTL | Pts | GF | GA |
|---|---|---|---|---|---|---|---|
| y-Bossier-Shreveport Mudbugs | 64 | 44 | 14 | 3 | 94 | 214 | 122 |
| x-Youngstown SteelHounds | 64 | 39 | 20 | 1 | 83 | 222 | 192 |
| x-Texas Brahmas | 64 | 40 | 20 | 1 | 83 | 222 | 192 |
| x-Mississippi RiverKings | 64 | 39 | 21 | 3 | 82 | 214 | 177 |
| x-Colorado Eagles | 64 | 37 | 20 | 2 | 81 | 254 | 223 |
| e-Rocky Mountain Rage | 64 | 36 | 22 | 5 | 78 | 241 | 220 |
| e-Oklahoma City Blazers | 64 | 28 | 30 | 2 | 62 | 188 | 193 |
| e-Tulsa Oilers | 64 | 25 | 35 | 3 | 54 | 194 | 243 |
| e-Wichita Thunder | 64 | 20 | 42 | 1 | 42 | 156 | 247 |

== See also ==
- 2007–08 CHL season
