= Rob Weingartner =

American ice hockey player and coach (born 1971)

- Born: October 22, 1971 (age 54) Lake Ronkonkoma, NY, USA
- Height: 5 ft 10 in (178 cm)
- Weight: 190 lb (86 kg; 13 st 8 lb)
- Position: Right Wing
- Shot: Right
- CHL team: Wichita Thunder
- Playing career: 1992–2000

Rob Weingartner is an American former professional ice hockey player and coach. He coached the Wichita Thunder of the Central Hockey League for the 2007–08 season and the Wichita Junior Thunder of the Western States Hockey League from 2012 to 2019. On April 8, 2020, Weingartner was named the head coach of the Florida Jr. Blades of the United States Premier Hockey League's Premier Division.

Weingartner's jersey number, 15, is retired by the Wichita Thunder.

== Career statistics ==
			Regular season					Playoffs
Season	Team	League	GP	G	A	Pts	PIM	GP	G	A	Pts	PIM
1992–93	Wichita Thunder	CHL	35	10	4	14	71	—	—	—	—	—
1993–94	Wichita Thunder	CHL	50	16	17	33	150	11	1	4	5	49
1994–95	Wichita Thunder	CHL	49	20	11	31	274	11	4	6	10	30
1995–96	Wichita Thunder	CHL	15	1	6	7	69	—	—	—	—	—
1995–96	San Antonio Iguanas	CHL	45	20	30	50	184	13	5	10	15	45
1996–97	Louisiana IceGators	ECHL	59	20	15	35	334	17	5	10	15	46
1996–97	Manitoba Moose	IHL	4	0	0	1	11	—	—	—	—	—
1997–98	Louisiana IceGators	ECHL	50	26	27	53	198	12	12	3	15	30
1997–98	Fort Wayne Komets	IHL	14	1	1	2	26	—	—	—	—	—
1998–99	Louisiana IceGators	ECHL	59	20	22	42	203	2	1	0	1	19
1999–00	Arkansas RiverBlades	ECHL	41	12	16	28	114	—	—	—	—	—
1999–00	Louisiana IceGators	ECHL	26	5	7	12	92	11	1	9	10	16

Sporting positions
Preceded by Mark French	Wichita Thunder head coach 2007 - 2008	Succeeded by Brent Bilodeau
