= Ken McKenzie Trophy =

The Ken McKenzie Trophy was awarded annually to the Central Hockey League's leading points scorer in the regular season. The award was named for Ken McKenzie, the co-founder and longtime president and publisher of The Hockey News.

Previously, the award was used by the Central Hockey League (1963-84) as their rookie of the year award, as selected by the CHL coaches. It was known simply as the Rookie of the Year award until the 1977-78 season.

== CPHL/CHL Rookie of the Year (1964 - 1984) ==
Year	Player	Team
1964
1964	Garry Peters	Omaha
1964	Poul Popiel	St. Louis
1965	Mike Walton	Tulsa
1966	Doug Roberts	Memphis
1967	Serge Savard	Houston
1968	Jim Lorentz	Oklahoma City
1969	Steve Atkinson	Oklahoma City
1970	Andre Dupont	Omaha
1971	Mike Murphy	Omaha
1972	Tom Williams	Omaha
1973	Mike Veisor	Dallas
1974	Claire Alexander	Oklahoma City
1975	Guy Chouinard	Omaha
1976	Brad Gassoff	Tulsa
1977	Bernie Federko	Kansas City
1978	Glen Hanlon	Tulsa
1979	Mike Eaves	Oklahoma City
1980	Joe Mullen	Salt Lake City
1981	Roland Melanson	Indianapolis
1982	Bobby Francis	Oklahoma City
1983	Larry Floyd	Wichita
1984	Scott MacLeod	Salt Lake City

== Winners (1993 - 2014) ==
Year	Player	Team
1993	Sylvain Fleury	Oklahoma City Blazers
1994	Paul Jackson	Wichita Thunder
1995	Brian Shantz	San Antonio Iguanas
1996	Brian Shantz	San Antonio Iguanas
1997	Trevor Jobe	Columbus Cottonmouths/Wichita Thunder
1998	Luc Beausoleil	Tulsa Oilers
1999	Derek Grant	Memphis RiverKings
2000
2000	Yvan Corbin	Indianapolis Ice
2000	Chris MacKenzie	Indianapolis Ice
2001	Yvan Corbin	Indianapolis Ice
2002	Dan Price	Austin Ice Bats
2003	Don Parsons	Memphis Riverkings
