= Dosdall =

Surname list

Dosdall is a surname. Notable people with the surname include:

- Cory Dosdall (born 1973), Canadian ice hockey player
- Kiira Dosdall (born 1987), American ice hockey player

== See also ==
- Dowdall
