= 2004–05 Wichita Thunder season =

2004–05 Wichita Thunder

Team information
- Coach: Derek Laxdal
- Captain: Jason Duda
- Alternate captains: Travis Clayton; Chad Mazurak
- Arena: Britt Brown Arena

The 2004–05 Wichita Thunder season was the 13th season of the CHL franchise in Wichita, Kansas. Forward Jason Duda was the Central Hockey League's 2004–2005 Scoring Champion, with 66 assists and 96 points during the season. Coach Bob Laxdal was suspended mid-way through the playoffs, after exchanging punches with Bossier-Shreveport Mudbugs coach Scott Muscutt.

== Regular season ==
=== Division standings ===
Northwest Division	GP	W	L	OTL	SOL	GF	GA	Pts
Colorado Eagles	60	43	10	5	2	221	123	93
Wichita Thunder	60	40	17	2	1	210	158	83
New Mexico Scorpions	60	27	27	1	5	185	210	60
Topeka Tarantulas	60	16	39	2	3	153	221	37

== Awards ==
Regular Season
Player	Award	Date
Joe Blaznek	Sherwood CHL Player of the Month (January)	February 9, 2005
Paul Esdale	CHL Most Outstanding Defenseman	March 18, 2005

== See also ==
- 2004–05 CHL season
