= James Latos =

Canadian ice hockey player and coach (born 1966)

- Born: January 4, 1966 (age 59); Wakaw, Saskatchewan, Canada
- Height: 6 ft 1 in (185 cm)
- Weight: 200 lb (91 kg; 14 st 4 lb)
- Position: Right wing
- Shot: Right
- Played for: New York Rangers
- NHL draft: Undrafted
- Playing career: 1987–1997

James "Jim" Latos (born January 4, 1966) is a Canadian former professional ice hockey player and coach. He played one game in the National Hockey League with the New York Rangers during the 1988–89 season, on March 1, 1989 against the Toronto Maple Leafs. The rest of his career, which lasted from 1987 to 1997 was spent in the minor leagues. After his playing career, Latos became a coach, and spent two seasons from 2001 to 2003 coaching the Wichita Thunder of the Central Hockey League.

== Career statistics ==
=== Regular season and playoffs ===
			Regular season					Playoffs
Season	Team	League	GP	G	A	Pts	PIM	GP	G	A	Pts	PIM
1982–83	Prince Albert Mintos U18	SMAAAHL	28	11	18	29	20	—	—	—	—	—
1983–84	Humboldt Broncos	SJHL	53	12	15	27	131	—	—	—	—	—
1984–85	Saskatoon Blades	WHL	62	9	9	18	120	3	1	1	2	0
1985–86	Saskatoon Blades	WHL	40	4	7	11	111	—	—	—	—	—
1985–86	Portland Winterhawks	WHL	21	6	7	13	80	9	1	1	2	32
1985–86	Portland Winterhawks	M-Cup	—	—	—	—	—	3	0	0	0	6
1986–87	Portland Winterhawks	WHL	69	27	18	45	210	20	5	3	8	56
1987–88	Colorado Rangers	IHL	38	11	12	23	98	—	—	—	—	—
1988–89	New York Rangers	NHL	1	0	0	0	0	—	—	—	—	—
1988–89	Denver Rangers	IHL	37	7	5	12	157	4	0	0	0	17
1989–90	Flint Spirits	IHL	71	12	15	27	244	4	0	0	0	4
1990–91	Kansas City Blades	IHL	61	14	14	28	187	—	—	—	—	—
1991–92	St. Thomas Wildcats	CoHL	27	7	13	20	62	—	—	—	—	—
1991–92	Knoxville Cherokees	ECHL	10	5	2	7	24	—	—	—	—	—
1991–92	Muskegon Lumberjacks	IHL	27	4	4	8	54	6	0	1	1	10
1992–93	Cleveland Lumberjacks	IHL	1	0	0	0	0	—	—	—	—	—
1992–93	Muskegon Fury	CoHL	59	10	24	34	163	7	2	0	2	4
1993–94	Wichita Thunder	CHL	63	19	34	53	227	11	4	5	9	27
1994–95	Lee Valley Lions	BD1	12	11	5	16	32	—	—	—	—	—
1994–95	Wichita Thunder	CHL	55	13	23	36	167	11	2	5	7	44
1995–96	Louisiana IceGators	ECHL	8	2	1	3	30	—	—	—	—	—
1996–97	Louisiana IceGators	ECHL	32	4	7	11	150	—	—	—	—	—
IHL totals			236	48	50	98	740	14	0	1	1	31
NHL totals			1	0	0	0	0	—	—	—	—	—

== See also ==
- List of players who played only one game in the NHL
