= Bob Woods (ice hockey) =

Canadian ice hockey player and coach

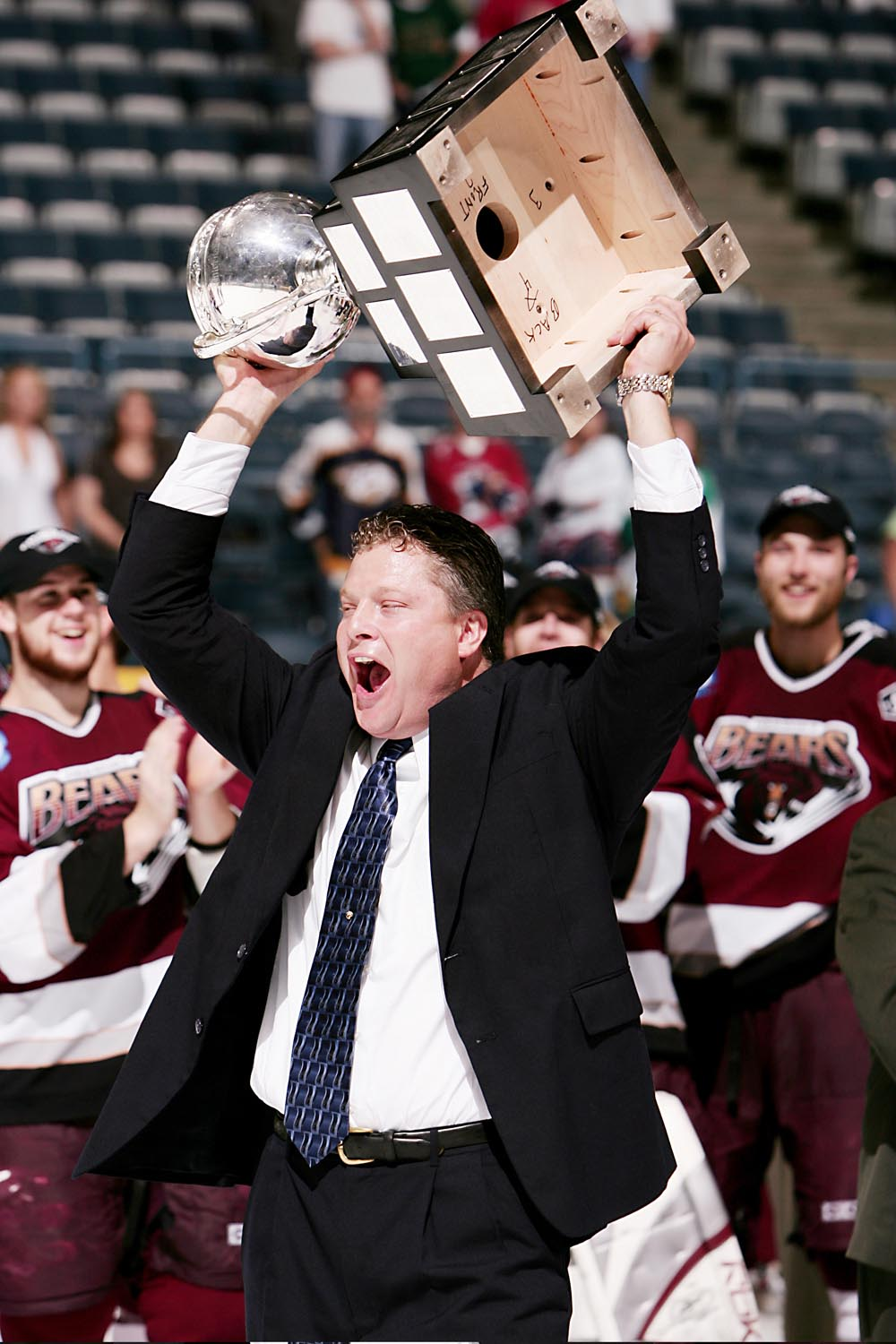
- Woods with the Calder Cup in 2006
- Born: January 24, 1968 (age 58) Leroy, Saskatchewan, Canada
- Height: 6 ft 1 in (185 cm)
- Weight: 192 lb (87 kg; 13 st 10 lb)
- Position: Defence
- Shot: Left
- Played for: AHL; Utica Devils; Hershey Bears; Portland Pirates; IHL; Fort Wayne Komets; ECHL; Johnstown Chiefs; Hampton Roads Admirals; Mobile Mysticks; Tallahassee Tiger Sharks; Mississippi Sea Wolves; Austria; Wiener EV; SJHL; Nipawin Hawks
- NHL draft: 201st overall, 1988; New Jersey Devils
- Playing career: 1989–2001

Bob Woods (born January 24, 1968) is a Canadian ice hockey coach and former player. He was most recently an assistant coach for the Seattle Kraken. He was the assistant coach of the Minnesota Wild of the National Hockey League. He is a former National Hockey League assistant coach with the Buffalo Sabres, Anaheim Ducks and Washington Capitals.

== Background ==
Born in 1968 in Leroy, Saskatchewan, Woods played in the Western Hockey League with the Brandon Wheat Kings. He was selected by the New Jersey Devils in the 10th round (201st overall) of the 1988 NHL entry draft and began his professional career in 1989 with the Utica Devils of the American Hockey League. Woods played the majority of his professional career in the ECHL where he played 599 games, scored 159 goals and 364 assists for 523 points, and earned 538 minutes in penalties. In 2012, Woods was honoured when he was inducted into the ECHL Hall of Fame.

He has been head coach of the Mississippi Sea Wolves, Hershey Bears, and Saskatoon Blades.

== Personal ==
His son Brendan Woods was selected by the Carolina Hurricanes in the 5th round (129th overall) of the 2012 NHL entry draft.

== Career statistics ==
			Regular season					Playoffs
Season	Team	League	GP	G	A	Pts	PIM	GP	G	A	Pts	PIM
1985–86	Nipawin Hawks	SJHL	59	7	19	26	208	—	—	—	—	—
1986–87	Nipawin Hawks	SJHL	53	22	48	70	78	—	—	—	—	—
1987–88	Brandon Wheat Kings	WHL	72	21	56	77	84	4	1	5	6	9
1988–89	Brandon Wheat Kings	WHL	68	26	50	76	100	—	—	—	—	—
1988–89	Utica Devils	AHL	11	0	1	1	2	4	0	0	0	2
1989–90	Utica Devils	AHL	58	2	12	14	30	5	0	0	0	6
1990–91	Utica Devils	AHL	33	4	6	10	21	—	—	—	—	—
1990–91	Johnstown Chiefs	ECHL	23	12	25	37	32	—	—	—	—	—
1991–92	Johnstown Chiefs	ECHL	63	18	43	61	44	6	4	1	5	14
1992–93	Johnstown Chiefs	ECHL	61	11	36	47	72	5	1	1	2	8
1993–94	Johnstown Chiefs	ECHL	43	18	37	55	57	3	1	3	4	4
1993–94	Hershey Bears	AHL	28	2	9	11	21	11	2	4	6	8
1994–95	Utica Blizzard	CoHL	1	0	0	0	0	—	—	—	—	—
1995–96	Hampton Roads Admirals	ECHL	66	3	26	29	106	3	1	2	3	17
1995–96	Portland Pirates	AHL	5	0	1	1	2	2	0	0	0	9
1996–97	Mobile Mysticks	ECHL	69	19	50	69	68	3	1	0	1	2
1996–97	Hershey Bears	AHL	6	1	0	1	2	16	0	1	1	4
1997–98	Tallahassee Tiger Sharks	ECHL	65	18	31	49	62	—	—	—	—	—
1997–98	Fort Wayne Komets	IHL	10	0	0	0	2	3	0	1	1	1
1998–99	Mississippi Sea Wolves	ECHL	70	24	38	62	41	18	2	6	8	12
1998–99	Fort Wayne Komets	IHL	1	2	0	2	0	—	—	—	—	—
1999–00	Mississippi Sea Wolves	ECHL	70	19	35	54	33	7	3	4	7	6
2000–01	Mississippi Sea Wolves	ECHL	69	17	43	60	23	—	—	—	—	—
AHL totals			141	9	29	38	78	38	2	5	7	29
ECHL totals			599	159	364	523	538	45	13	17	30	63

== Records ==
- ECHL: Most career goals by a defenceman (159)

== Awards ==
- WHL East Second All-Star Team – 1989

Sporting positions
Preceded by Bruce Boudreau	Head coach of the Hershey Bears; 2007–2009	Succeeded by Mark French
