= 1993–94 CHL season =

- League: Central Hockey League
- Sport: Ice hockey

Regular season
- Adams’ Cup: Wichita Thunder
- Season MVP: Robert Desjardins (Wichita)
- Top scorer: Paul Jackson (Wichita)

Finals
- Champions: Wichita Thunder
- Runners-up: Tulsa Oilers

CHL seasons
- 1992–93 1994–95

The 1993–94 CHL season was the second season of the Central Hockey League (CHL).

== Teams ==
1993-94 Central Hockey League
Team	City	Arena
Dallas Freeze	Dallas, Texas	Fair Park Coliseum
Fort Worth Fire	Fort Worth, Texas	Fort Worth Convention Center
Memphis RiverKings	Memphis, Tennessee	Mid-South Coliseum
Oklahoma City Blazers	Oklahoma City, Oklahoma	Myriad Convention Center
Tulsa Oilers	Tulsa, Oklahoma	Tulsa Coliseum
Wichita Thunder	Wichita, Kansas	Britt Brown Arena

== Map of teams ==
Central Hockey League teams

== Regular season ==
=== League standings ===
Central Hockey League	GP	W	L	T	GF	GA	Pts
y-Wichita Thunder	64	40	18	6	309	275	86
x-Tulsa Oilers	64	36	24	4	347	281	76
x-Oklahoma City Blazers	64	35	23	6	260	246	76
x-Dallas Freeze	64	31	25	8	304	309	70
e-Memphis RiverKings	64	25	34	5	243	294	55
e-Fort Worth Fire	64	25	37	2	253	311	52

Note: y - clinched league title; x - clinched playoff spot; e - eliminated from playoff contention

== Playoffs ==
=== Playoff bracket ===
Ray Miron Cup first round
1	Wichita Thunder	4
4	Dallas Freeze	3
2	Tulsa Oilers	4
3	Oklahoma City Blazers	3

Ray Miron Cup finals
1	Wichita Thunder	4
2	Tulsa Oilers	0

== CHL awards ==
Ray Miron Cup:	Wichita Thunder
Adams Cup:	Wichita Thunder
Coach of the Year:	Doug Shedden (Wichita)
Most Valuable Player:	Robert Desjardins (Wichita)
Playoff Most Valuable Player:	Ron Handy (Wichita)
Most Outstanding Goaltender:	Alan Perry (Oklahoma City)
Most Outstanding Defenseman	Guy Girouard (Oklahoma City)
Rookie of the Year	Chad Seibel (Memphis)
Scoring Champion	Paul Jackson (Wichita)

== Player statistics ==
=== Scoring leaders ===
Note: GP = Games played; G = Goals; A = Assists; Pts = Points; PIM = Penalty minutes

Player	Team	GP	G	A	Pts	PIM
Paul Jackson	Wichita Thunder	59	71	64	135	215
Doug Lawrence	Tulsa Oilers	63	25	93	118	199
Luc Beausoleil	Tulsa Oilers	60	64	50	114	110
Ron Handy	Wichita Thunder	57	29	80	109	98
Carl Boudreau	Oklahoma City Blazers	64	40	67	107	93
Bob Berg	Wichita Thunder	64	43	58	101	141
Troy Binnie	Dallas Freeze	56	54	42	96	96
Brent Sapergia	Wichita Thunder	46	55	33	88	297
Frank LaScala	Dallas Freeze	64	45	41	86	116
Craig Coxe	Tulsa Oilers	64	26	57	83	236
Bobby Wallwork	Memphis RiverKings	64	43	40	83	83
