= Ron Handy =

Canadian ice hockey player

- Born: January 15, 1963 (age 62) Toronto, Ontario, Canada
- Height: 5 ft 11 in (180 cm)
- Weight: 175 lb (79 kg; 12 st 7 lb)
- Position: Centre
- Shot: Left
- Played for: New York Islanders; St. Louis Blues
- NHL draft: 57th overall, 1981; New York Islanders
- Playing career: 1983–2000

Ronald Handy (born January 15, 1963) is a Canadian retired professional ice hockey player who played 14 games in the National Hockey League.

== Biography ==
Handy was born in Toronto, Ontario. As a youth, he played in the 1976 Quebec International Pee-Wee Hockey Tournament with the Toronto Shopsy's minor ice hockey team.

Handy began his junior ice hockey career with the Sault Ste. Marie Greyhounds. In November 1981, he was traded along with a fifth-round draft pick to the Kingston Canadians, in exchange for Jim Aldred and Chuck Brimmer.

Handy played with the New York Islanders and St. Louis Blues. Handy was more known for his lengthy and traveled career through the minor league circuits of hockey. His last stop as a player was as a member of the Arkansas Riverblades, which he became the head coach of after retiring as a player.

On July 31, 2015, Ron Handy was inducted into The Committee Hall of Fame. He was only one of six members inducted into the 2015 Committee HOF Class.

== Career statistics ==
			Regular season					Playoffs
Season	Team	League	GP	G	A	Pts	PIM	GP	G	A	Pts	PIM
1979–80	Port Credit Titans	MJBHL	3	2	3	5	0	—	—	—	—	—
1979–80	Toronto Marlboros	OMJHL	39	48	60	108	—	—	—	—	—	—
1980–81	Sault Ste. Marie Greyhounds	OHL	66	43	43	86	45	—	—	—	—	—
1981–82	Sault Ste. Marie Greyhounds	OHL	20	15	10	25	20	—	—	—	—	—
1981–82	Kingston Canadians	OHL	44	35	38	73	23	4	1	1	2	16
1982–83	Kingston Canadians	OHL	67	52	96	148	64	—	—	—	—	—
1982–83	Indianapolis Checkers	CHL	9	2	7	9	0	10	3	8	11	18
1983–84	Indianapolis Checkers	CHL	66	29	46	75	40	10	2	5	7	0
1984–85	Springfield Indians	AHL	69	29	35	64	38	3	2	2	4	0
1984–85	New York Islanders	NHL	10	0	2	2	0	—	—	—	—	—
1985–86	Springfield Indians	AHL	79	31	30	61	66	—	—	—	—	—
1986–87	Indianapolis Checkers	IHL	82	55	80	135	57	6	4	3	7	2
1987–88	Peoria Rivermen	IHL	78	53	63	116	61	7	2	3	5	4
1987–88	St. Louis Blues	NHL	4	0	1	1	0	—	—	—	—	—
1988–89	Indianapolis Ice	IHL	81	43	57	100	52	—	—	—	—	—
1989–90	Fort Wayne Komets	IHL	82	36	39	75	52	5	3	1	4	0
1990–91	Kansas City Blades	IHL	64	42	39	81	41	—	—	—	—	—
1991–92	Kansas City Blades	IHL	38	16	19	35	30	15	13	8	21	8
1992–93	Kansas City Blades	IHL	6	1	1	2	2	—	—	—	—	—
1992–93	Peoria Rivermen	IHL	18	0	7	7	16	—	—	—	—	—
1992–93	Wichita Thunder	CHL	11	6	12	18	20	—	—	—	—	—
1993–94	Wichita Thunder	CHL	57	29	80	109	98	11	12	10	22	12
1994–95	Sheffield Steelers	BHL	6	8	6	14	2	—	—	—	—	—
1994–95	Denver Grizzlies	IHL	1	0	0	0	0	—	—	—	—	—
1994–95	Wichita Thunder	CHL	46	24	45	69	72	11	15	16	31	4
1995–96	Huntsville Channel Cats	SHL-Sr.	3	3	1	4	0	—	—	—	—	—
1995–96	Louisiana IceGators	ECHL	58	20	65	85	34	5	2	4	6	2
1996–97	Louisiana IceGators	ECHL	66	33	67	100	58	17	5	17	22	0
1997–98	Huntsville Channel Cats	CHL	46	27	33	60	50	2	0	1	1	0
1998–99	Lake Charles Ice Pirates	WPHL	15	5	10	15	21	—	—	—	—	—
1999–00	Arkansas RiverBlades	ECHL	9	1	1	2	8	—	—	—	—	—
NHL totals			14	0	3	3	0	—	—	—	—	—
AHL totals			148	60	65	125	104	3	2	2	4	0
IHL totals			450	246	305	551	311	33	22	15	37	14
