= Don Jackson (ice hockey) =

American ice hockey player

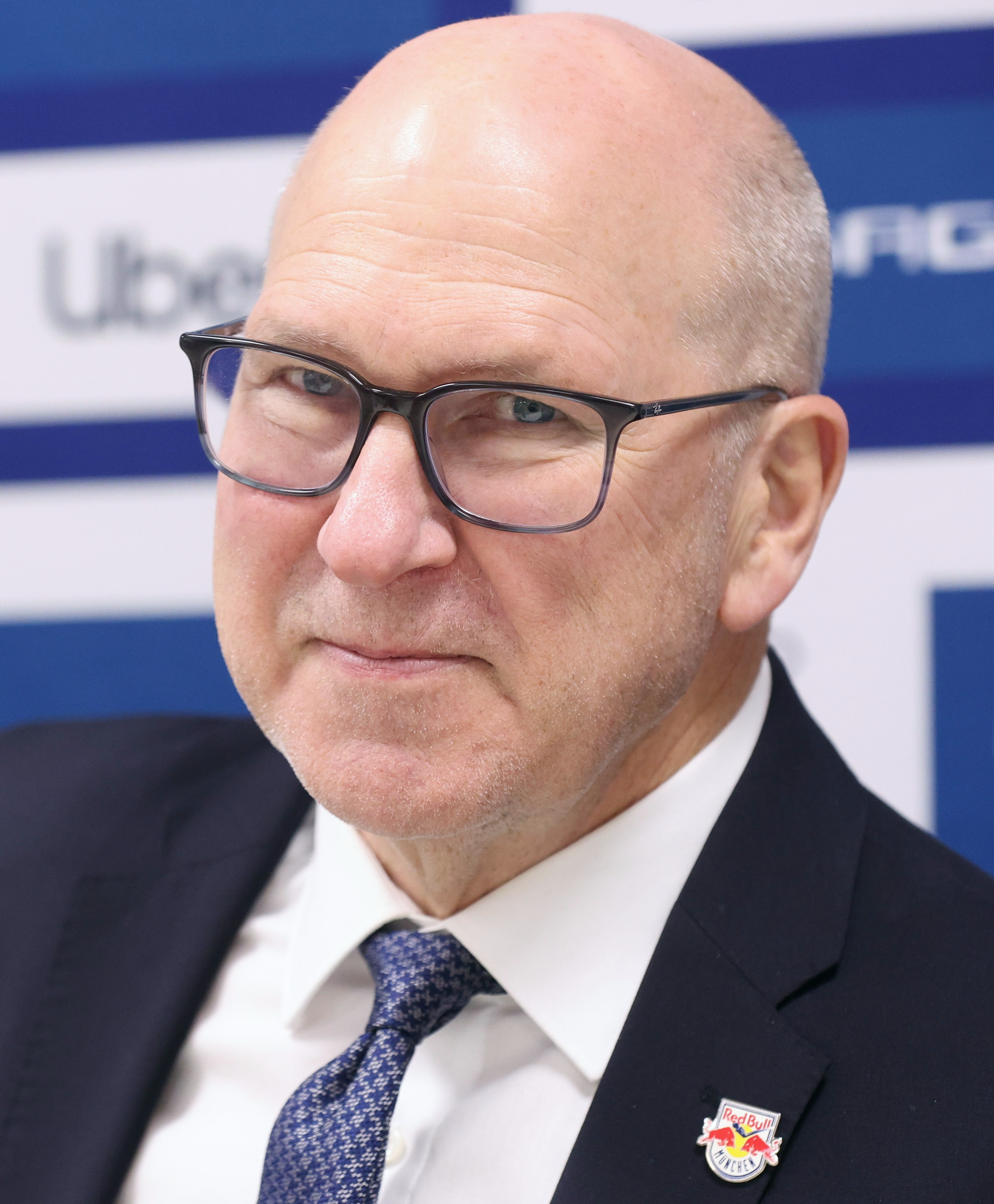
- Born: September 2, 1956 (age 70) Minneapolis, Minnesota, U.S.
- Height: 6 ft 3 in (191 cm)
- Weight: 210 lb (95 kg; 15 st 0 lb)
- Position: Defense
- Shot: Left
- Played for: Minnesota North Stars; Edmonton Oilers; New York Rangers
- National team: United States
- NHL draft: 39th overall, 1976; Minnesota North Stars
- WHA draft: 91st overall, 1976; Calgary Cowboys
- Playing career: 1978–1987

Donald Clinton Jackson (born September 2, 1956) is an American ice hockey coach and former professional ice hockey player who played 315 games in the National Hockey League (NHL) between 1978 and 1987. Jackson began his coaching career in 1988.

From May 2014 through May 2023, he served as head coach of EHC Red Bull München. During his time in Munich, he won five Deutsche Eishockey Liga titles.

== Playing career ==
Jackson grew up playing ice hockey in Bloomington, Minnesota, for John F. Kennedy High School and earned a scholarship to attend and play for the Fighting Irish of Notre Dame. Prior to graduating from the University of Notre Dame in 1978, Jackson was drafted by the Minnesota North Stars in the NHL's 1976 Amateur Draft, third round, 39th overall. He played 2 games for the North Stars late in the 1978 season after finishing his college career and spent most of the next 3 seasons playing for the North Stars minor league team, the Oklahoma City Stars. Prior to the 1981–82 NHL season, Jackson was traded to the Edmonton Oilers and played most of that season with Edmonton's minor league team, the Wichita Wind. Jackson earned his NHL break at the beginning of the 1982–83 season and played 262 games for the Oilers, earning Stanley Cup Champion rings in 1984 and 1985. After the 1985–86 season, Jackson was traded to the New York Rangers for his final NHL season before retiring.

Jackson was also a member of the United States Ice Hockey World Cup team at the 1978 and 1979 Ice Hockey World Championship tournaments.

== Coaching career ==
Jackson returned to ice hockey in 1989 as the head coach for the Knoxville Cherokees of the East Coast Hockey League (ECHL). His success with the Cherokees during the 1990–91 earned him recognition as Coach of the Year. In 1991, Jackson was hired by Pierre Page as an assistant coach for the Quebec Nordiques, where he served for 3 seasons. He moved on to serve as head coach for the Cincinnati Cyclones of the IHL for the 1994–95 season, the Wichita Thunder of the Central Hockey League for the 1995–96 season and the Kansas City Blades of the IHL for the 1996–97 season. In 1997, Jackson was hired by Kevin Constantine as assistant coach for the Pittsburgh Penguins, serving 3 seasons. Jackson was employed as assistant coach by the Chicago Blackhawks for 3 months of the 2000–01 season, and was named assistant coach of the Ottawa Senators the following year. Jackson stayed with the Senators until his contract ended without being renewed in 2004.

The 2004–05 NHL lockout pushed Jackson to find a coaching role in Europe. Late into the 2004–05 season of the Deutsche Eishockey Liga (German Hockey League), Jackson was asked by general manager Peter Lee and head coach Pierre Page to join the Eisbären Berlin coaching staff as an assistant. Berlin won their first championship that season.

Berlin's success helped Jackson earn his first head coaching position in the Deutsche Eishockey Liga (DEL) with Lance Nethery and DEG Metro Stars of Düsseldorf, who ended the 2004–05 season in 10th place. In Jackson's first season, 2005–06, in Düsseldorf, he coached the team to a third-place regular season finish and into the playoff finals, where they lost against the Eisbären Berlin in 2006 DEL playoff finals. Jackson carried that success into a second season in Düsseldorf, finishing second in regular season play and losing in the playoff semi-finals.

After the 2006–07 season Jackson moved into the head coach position for the Eisbären Berlin of the Deutsche Eishockey Liga, who had finished in 9th place. Jackson repeated the success he demonstrated in Düsseldorf by coaching Eisbären Berlin to a second-place regular season finish and a playoff finals DEL championship in his first season there. For that achievement, Jackson was awarded the Order of Merit of Berlin. In his six seasons as head coach with Eisbären Berlin (2007–13), Jackson coached the team to 3 first-place regular season finishes, 5 DEL championships, and a 2010 victory for the European Trophy (currently, Champions Hockey League).

In 2013, Jackson joined Red Bull Hockey to coach their team EC Red Bull Salzburg in the Austrian Hockey League for the 2013–14 season, which had finished their previous season in 8th place. Jackson again repeated his success by coaching the team to a first-place regular season finish, losing a game 7 overtime in the League Playoff finals. After the season, Red Bull Hockey moved Jackson to their team, EHC Red Bull München, for the 2014–15 season where the team finished second overall but exited the playoffs early. The second-place finish earned Red Bull München a position in the 2015–16 Champions Hockey League, where they won in the group stage to advance to the playoff, then lost in the round of 32. Jackson's leadership of EHC Red Bull München for the 2015–16 season again improved on the team's success by finishing in first place in regular season play, and culminating in a 4-game sweep of the Wolfsburg Grizzlys for the 2016 DEL Playoff Championship. This was the 6th DEL Playoff Championship for Jackson in his 10 years as a head coach in the Deutsche Eishockey Liga.

In both the 2016–17 and 2017-18 campaigns, Jackson led Munich to a successful defense of its title, capturing his seventh and eighth German championships as a head coach.

Year	Team	League	Position
1988–91	Knoxville Cherokees	ECHL	Head coach
1991–94	Quebec Nordiques	NHL	Assistant coach
1994–95	Cincinnati Cyclones	IHL	Head coach
1995–96	Wichita Thunder	CHL	Head coach
1996–97	Kansas City Blades	IHL	Head coach
1997–2000	Pittsburgh Penguins	NHL	Assistant coach
2000–01	Chicago Blackhawks	NHL	Assistant coach
2001–05	Ottawa Senators	NHL	Assistant coach
2005	Eisbären Berlin	DEL	Assistant coach
2005–07	DEG Metro Stars	DEL	Head coach
2007–13	Eisbären Berlin	DEL	Head coach
2013–14	EC Red Bull Salzburg	EBEL	Head coach
2014–present	EHC Red Bull München	DEL	Head coach

== Head coaching record ==
Season	Team	League	Season record	League finish	Note
1989–90	Knoxville Cherokees	ECHL	21–33–0–6	8	Replaced Pierre Hamel mid-season. Did not make playoffs
1990–91	Knoxville Cherokees	ECHL	46–13–0–5	1	Lost in quarterfinal round
1994–95	Cincinnati Cyclones	IHL	49–22–0–10	3	Lost in quarterfinal round.
1995–96	Wichita Thunder	CHL	22–39–0–3	6	Did not make playoffs.
1996–97	Kansas City Blades	IHL	38–29–0–15	5	Lost in quarterfinal round.
2005–06	DEG Metro Stars	DEL	30–15–0–7	2	Lost in final round. Team improved from prior season 10th place finish.
2006–07	DEG Metro Stars	DEL	33–15–0–4	2	Lost in semifinal round
2007–08	Eisbären Berlin	DEL	38–14–0–4	2	Playoff champion. Team improved from prior season 9th place finish.
2008–09	Eisbären Berlin	DEL	36–14–0–2	1	Playoff champion
2009–10	Eisbären Berlin	DEL	42–11–0–3	1	Lost in semifinal round
2010–11	Eisbären Berlin	DEL	30–16–0–6	3	Playoff champion
2011–12	Eisbären Berlin	DEL	33–16–0–3	1	Playoff champion
2012–13	Eisbären Berlin	DEL	28–18–0–6	4	Playoff champion
2013–14	EC Salzburg	Austria	33–13–4–4	1	Lost in final round. Team improved from prior season 8th place finish
2014–15	EHC München	DEL	28–15–5–4	2	Lost in quarterfinal round. Team improved from prior season 7th place finish.
2015–16	EHC München	DEL	25–14–6–7	1	Playoff champion
2016–17	EHC München	DEL	31–12–5–4	1	Playoff champion
2017–18	EHC München	DEL	30-11-6-5	1	Playoff champion

== Awards and achievements ==
- 1983–84 - NHL - Stanley Cup (Edmonton)
- 1984–85 - NHL - Stanley Cup (Edmonton)
- 1991 ECHL Coach of the Year (John Brophy Award)
- 2007–08 - DEL (Deutsche Eishockey Liga) Champions (Eisbären Berlin)
- 2008 - Order of Merit of Berlin
- 2008–09 - DEL (Deutsche Eishockey Liga) Champions (Eisbären Berlin)
- 2010–11 - DEL (Deutsche Eishockey Liga) Champions (Eisbären Berlin)
- 2011–12 - DEL (Deutsche Eishockey Liga) Champions (Eisbären Berlin)
- 2012–13 - DEL (Deutsche Eishockey Liga) Champions (Eisbären Berlin)
- 2015–16 - DEL (Deutsche Eishockey Liga) Champions (EHC Red Bull München)
- 2016–17 - DEL (Deutsche Eishockey Liga) Champions (EHC Red Bull München)
- 2017–18 - DEL (Deutsche Eishockey Liga) Champions (EHC Red Bull München)

== Career statistics ==
=== Regular season and playoffs ===
			Regular season					Playoffs
Season	Team	League	GP	G	A	Pts	PIM	GP	G	A	Pts	PIM
1973–74	Bloomington Kennedy High School	HS-MN	—	—	—	—	—	—	—	—	—	—
1974–75	University of Notre Dame	WCHA	35	2	7	9	29	—	—	—	—	—
1975–76	University of Notre Dame	WCHA	30	4	5	9	22	—	—	—	—	—
1976–77	University of Notre Dame	WCHA	38	2	9	11	52	—	—	—	—	—
1977–78	University of Notre Dame	WCHA	37	10	23	33	69	—	—	—	—	—
1977–78	Minnesota North Stars	NHL	2	0	0	0	2	—	—	—	—	—
1978–79	Minnesota North Stars	NHL	5	0	0	0	2	—	—	—	—	—
1978–79	Oklahoma City Stars	CHL	73	8	23	31	108	—	—	—	—	—
1979–80	Minnesota North Stars	NHL	10	0	4	4	18	1	0	0	0	0
1979–80	Oklahoma City Stars	CHL	33	5	9	14	54	—	—	—	—	—
1980–81	Minnesota North Stars	NHL	10	0	3	3	19	—	—	—	—	—
1980–81	Oklahoma City Stars	CHL	59	5	33	38	67	3	0	0	0	0
1981–82	Edmonton Oilers	NHL	8	0	0	0	18	—	—	—	—	—
1981–82	Wichita Wind	CHL	71	7	37	44	116	7	0	1	1	21
1982–83	Edmonton Oilers	NHL	71	2	8	10	136	16	3	3	6	30
1982–83	Birmingham South Stars	CHL	4	1	4	5	8	—	—	—	—	—
1983–84	Edmonton Oilers	NHL	64	8	12	20	120	19	1	2	3	32
1984–85	Edmonton Oilers	NHL	78	3	17	20	141	9	0	0	0	64
1985–86	Edmonton Oilers	NHL	45	2	8	10	93	8	0	0	0	21
1986–87	New York Rangers	NHL	22	1	0	1	91	—	—	—	—	—
CHL totals			240	26	106	132	353	10	0	1	1	21
NHL totals			315	16	52	68	640	53	4	5	9	147

=== International ===
Year	Team	Event	GP	G	A	Pts	PIM
1978	United States	WC	10	1	1	2	4
1979	United States	WC	8	0	1	1	16
Senior totals			18	1	2	3	20

Sporting positions
Preceded by Doug Shedden	Wichita Thunder head coach 1995 - 1996	Succeeded by Bryan Wells
