= Bryan Wells (ice hockey) =

Canadian ice hockey player and coach

- Born: February 24, 1966 (age 59) Moosomin, Saskatchewan, Canada
- Height: 5 ft 7 in (170 cm)
- Weight: 180 lb (82 kg; 12 st 12 lb)
- Position: Center
- Shot: Right
- CHL team: Wichita Thunder
- Playing career: 1981–1996

Bryan Wells (born February 24, 1966) is a Canadian former professional ice hockey player and ice hockey coach. He coached the Wichita Thunder from 1996–2001.

== Career statistics ==
			Regular season					Playoffs
Season	Team	League	GP	G	A	Pts	PIM	GP	G	A	Pts	PIM
1982–83	Brandon Wheat Kings	WHL	43	8	10	18	182	—	—	—	—	—
1983–84	Brandon Wheat Kings	WHL	53	22	23	45	259	12	3	4	7	86
1984–85	Regina Pats	WHL	40	17	28	45	207	—	—	—	—	—
1985–86	Regina Pats	WHL	62	22	63	85	283	10	4	3	7	63
1986–87	Regina Pats	WHL	20	7	15	22	105	—	—	—	—	—
1986–87	Carolina Thunderbirds	ACHL	7	5	5	10	66	5	4	2	6	40
1986–87	Indianapolis Checkers	IHL	10	2	2	4	60	—	—	—	—	—

Sporting positions
Preceded by Don Jackson	Wichita Thunder Head Coach; 1996–2001	Succeeded by James Latos
