= Mark French (ice hockey) =

Canadian professional ice hockey coach

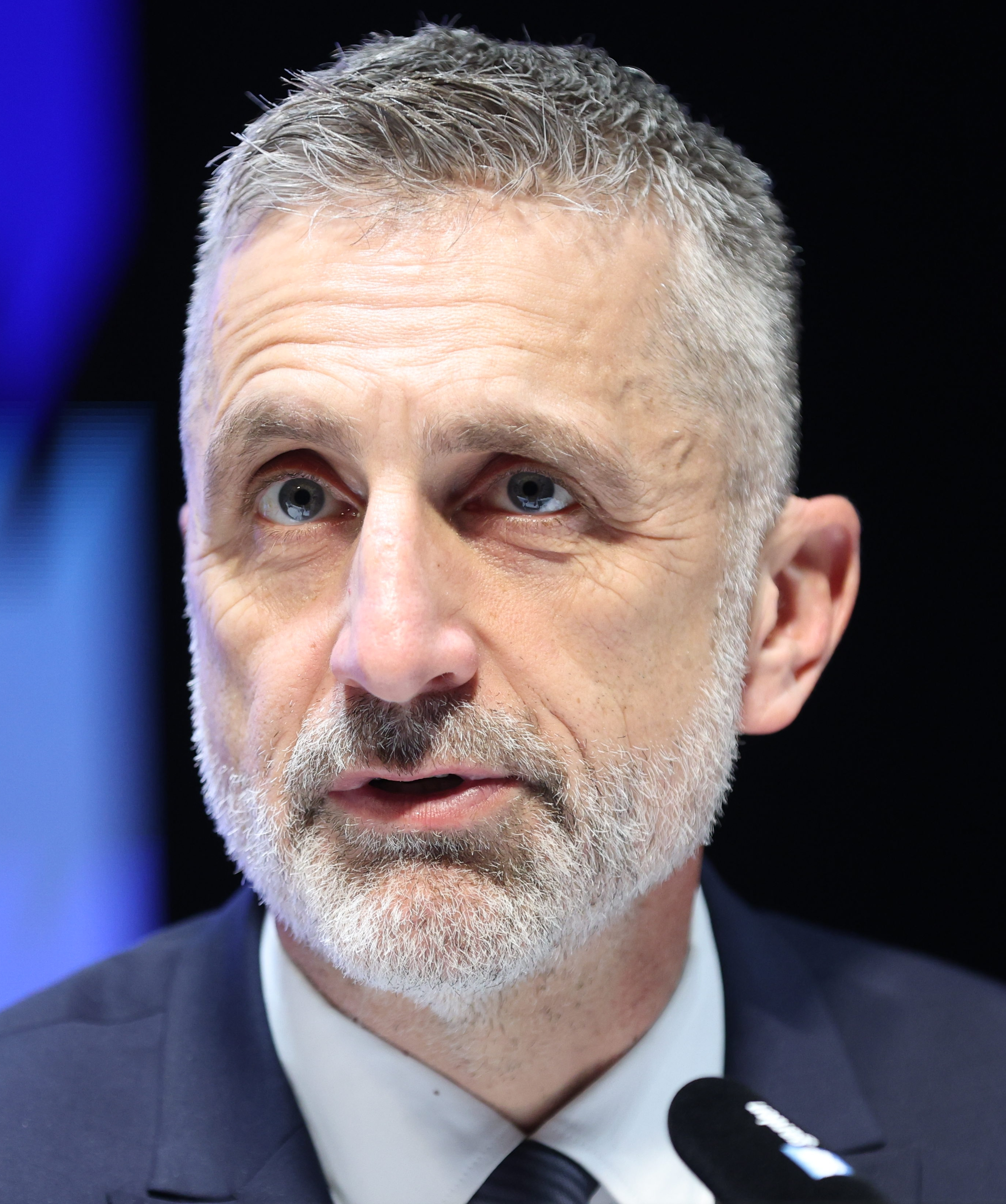
Mark French (2024)

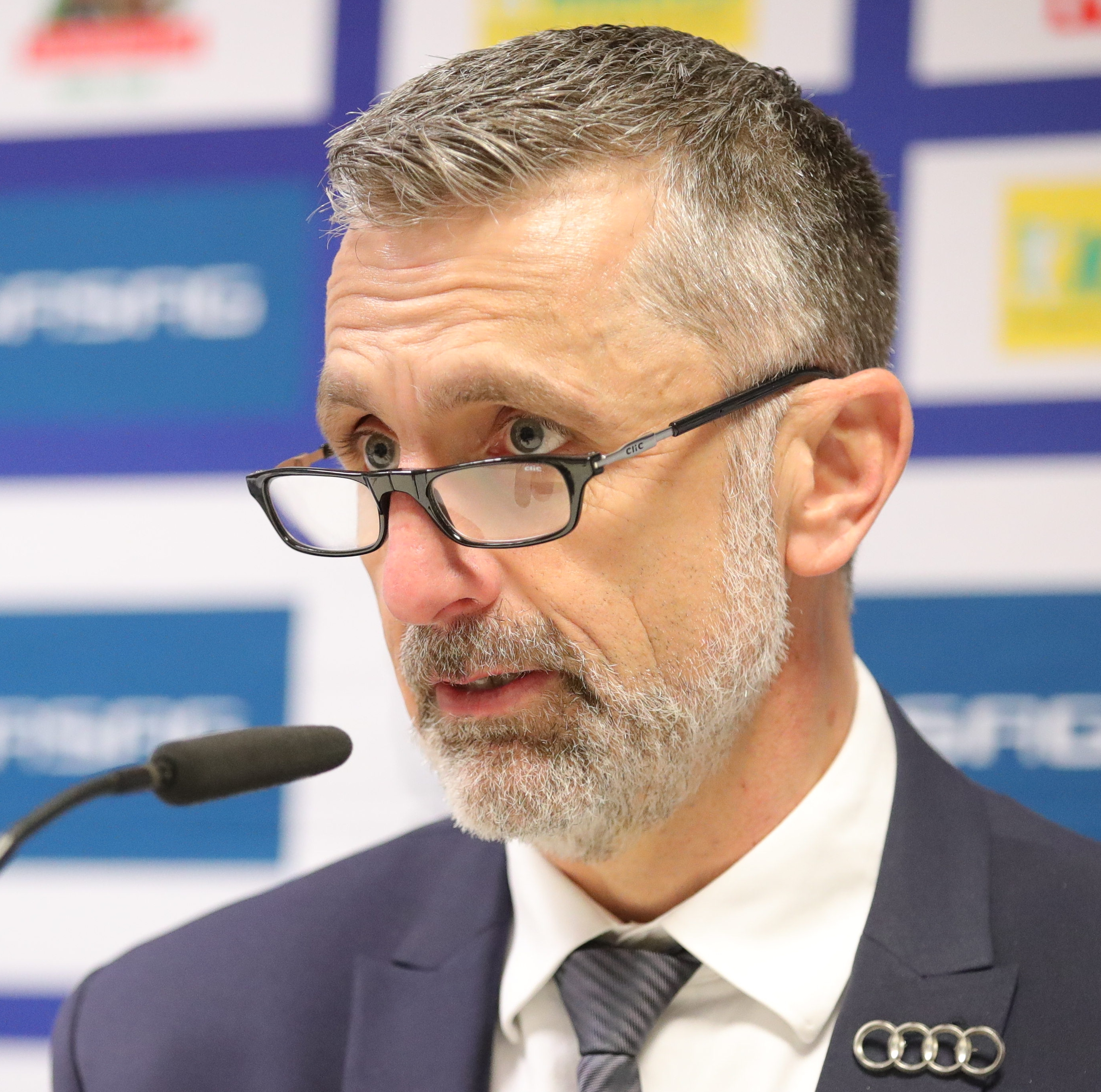
Mark French (2022)

Mark French is a Canadian professional ice hockey coach.

== Playing career ==
A native of Milton, Ontario, French played college hockey at Brock University in St. Catharines, Ontario, serving as assistant captain for three years there and received the prestigious "212 Degrees" annual award all four seasons, presented to the athlete who demonstrates leadership, commitment and excellence on the ice.

== Coaching career ==
French was the head coach at Wilfrid Laurier University from 2002 to 2004. He was then an assistant coach in the ECHL with the Atlantic City Boardwalk Bullies during the 2004–05 season as the Bullies posted a 42–21–9 record. He became the head coach and director of hockey operations for the Central Hockey League's Wichita Thunder from 2005 to 2007. He was fired in December 2007 after starting the 2007–08 season with a 4–13–0 record.

He became an assistant with the American Hockey League's (AHL) Hershey Bears in January 2008 and was named the franchise's 23rd head coach in 2009 following the promotion of Bob Woods to the Washington Capitals. In his first season, French guided the Bears to an AHL record 60 wins and the team's eleventh Calder Cup. French coached in Hershey for four seasons, compiling a 180–100–32 record. As of 2020, he ranked third in AHL history in winning percentage among coaches with at least 300 games.

In June 2013, French took the head coaching position for the newly-formed KHL Medveščak Zagreb of the Kontinental Hockey League. French left Medveščak Zagreb after one season for the Calgary Hitmen of the Western Hockey League in June 2014. He coached the Hitmen for three seasons.

On May 28, 2017, French became the head coach of HC Fribourg-Gottéron, signing a two-year deal with the National League A team.

On June 8, 2020, French became the head coach of the Wheeling Nailers, the ECHL affiliate of the Pittsburgh Penguins. He resigned on April 21, 2021, to return to his family in Prince Edward Island that he had not been able to see for months due to the border closure during the COVID-19 pandemic.

== Personal life ==
He lives in Calgary with his wife Kimberly. They have two children, Ellie and William.

== Career statistics ==
			Regular season
Season	Team	League	GP	G	A	Pts	PIM
1995–96	Brock University	CIAU	20	2	3	5	28
CIAU totals			20	2	3	5	28

== Awards and honours ==
Award	Year
DEL
Coach of the year	2025

Sporting positions
Preceded by Bob Woods	Head coach of the Hershey Bears; 2009–2013	Succeeded by Mike Haviland
