= Cory Dosdall =

Canadian ice hockey player

- Born: February 1, 1973 (age 52); Regina, Saskatchewan, Canada
- Height: 5 ft 10 in (178 cm)
- Weight: 185 lb (84 kg; 13 st 3 lb)
- Position: Centre
- Shot: left
- Played for: Wichita Thunder (CHL)
- NHL draft: Undrafted
- Playing career: 1996–1999

Cory Dosdall (born February 1, 1973) is a Canadian retired professional ice hockey player.

Dosdall played five seasons of major junior hockey in the Western Hockey League with the Regina Pats, Tri-City Americans, and Lethbridge Hurricanes. He began his professional career during the 1995–96 season playing in the Central Hockey League with the Wichita Thunder, where he was named the CHL Rookie of the Year. Dosdall retired from professional hockey following the 1998–99 season.

== Career statistics ==
			Regular season					Playoffs
Season	Team	League	GP	G	A	Pts	PIM	GP	G	A	Pts	PIM
1989–90	Regina Pats	WHL	25	5	6	11	86	11	1	2	3	20
1989–90	Melfort Mustangs	SJHL	22	10	13	23	232	—	—	—	—	—
1990–91	Regina Pats	WHL	11	4	1	5	34	—	—	—	—	—
1990–91	Tri-City Americans	WHL	56	21	27	48	196	6	1	3	4	26
1991–92	Tri-City Americans	WHL	69	37	43	80	343	5	0	0	0	28
1992–93	Tri-City Americans	WHL	18	11	9	20	66	—	—	—	—	—
1992–93	Lethbridge Hurricanes	WHL	53	22	45	67	139	4	1	3	4	8
1993–94	Regina Pats	WHL	69	28	50	78	242	4	0	3	3	12
1994–95	University of Regina	CIAU	—	—	—	—	—	—	—	—	—	—
1995–96	University of Regina	CIAU	—	—	—	—	—	—	—	—	—	—
1996–97	Wichita Thunder	CHL	62	36	36	72	272	9	2	3	5	23
1997–98	Wichita Thunder	CHL	65	33	39	72	261	14	5	1	6	79
1998–99	Wichita Thunder	CHL	1	2	0	2	0	—	—	—	—	—
CHL totals			128	71	75	146	533	23	7	4	11	102

== Awards and honours ==
- CHL Rookie of the Year (1996–97)
