= Chris Stewart (ice hockey, born 1961) =

Canadian ice hockey coach, president and manager

- Born: April 7, 1961 (age 64) Red Deer, Alberta, Canada
- Height: 6 ft 0 in (183 cm)
- Weight: 174 lb (79 kg; 12 st 6 lb)
- Position: Defence
- Shot: Left
- Played for: St. Albert Saints (AJHL)
- NHL draft: Undrafted
- Playing career: 1980–1982

Chris Stewart (born April 7, 1961) is a Canadian ice hockey coach, president and manager. He was most notable as the Head Coach, President and General Manager of the Colorado Eagles while they were in the Central Hockey League ECHL and the American Hockey League.

== Career ==
Chris Stewart, the former head coach of the Olds Grizzlys, was inducted into the Alberta Hockey Hall of Fame in 2014 for his accomplishments in Canadian Junior 'A' hockey, including producing 46 NHL draft picks.

Stewart's success as the head coach of the Olds Grizzlys led to his induction into the Alberta Hockey Hall of Fame in 2014.

As a Head Coach, Stewart won three Ray Miron President's Cups. He won his first Central Hockey League championship with the 1998–99 Huntsville Channel Cats and two more with the Colorado Eagles (then of the CHL) in the 2004–05 and 2006–07 seasons.

Chris Stewart came to the United States under “exceptional alien” status due to his coaching talents and hockey smarts and became the Head Coach and Director of Hockey Operations for the Huntsville Channel Cats, followed by holding the same position for the San Antonio Iguanas. Stewart was recruited by Ralph Backstrom, the hockey legend himself, to become the Head Coach and Director or Hockey Operations for the Colorado Eagles during Stewart’s brief time with the Corpus Christi Ice Rays; this began the inception of CHL team follows by franchise investors.

Stewart temporarily retired as Head Coach of the Eagles in 2008 temporarily for a back injury sustained during his career in juniors, before returning to the position in 2010, but remained GM and President through those two years while recovering. He retired from coaching in 2016 to focus on the booming business the franchise had created and filled coaching jobs from within the organization showing his dedication to the players, but remained with the Eagles as General Manager and President. The Eagles won back-to-back Kelly Cups in his last two seasons as General Manager before the organization joined the American Hockey League in 2018. As the Eagles became the AHL affiliate of the Colorado Avalanche, he was replaced as general manager by the Avalanche's assistant general manager as a condition of the league change, Craig Billington, in 2018. Chris Stewart remained President of the team until his retirement in 2021.

In 2024 Stewart briefly consulted for National Juniors, returning to his roots.

Stewart routinely made headlines including appearances on ESPN for his behind the bench antics and fan supported temper. Additionally, Stewart became and remains a pillar of community in Windsor, CO with his hand in projects like Inspiration Playground, his development of youth hockey in Northern Colorado throughout his time at the Eagles and in small town Alberta that he frequently visits.

Stewart continues to have influence in the sport through youth hockey, National Juniors and his close, peer relationships spanning leagues including the NHL.
