= Robert Desjardins =

Canadian professional goaltender

Robert Desjardins (born May 4, 1967) was a Canadian professional goaltender who had a stellar junior and university career but only a short professional career.

Born in Verdun, Quebec, Desjardins played in the Quebec Major Junior Hockey League from 1984 to 1988, each year with a different team. In 1984–85 he was with the Shawinigan Cataractes; in 1985–86 Hull Olympiques; in 1986–87 Longueuil Chevaliers; and in 1987–88 Victoriaville Tigres.

Despite his team changes, Desjardins won several league awards, including leading goalie in 1985–86 and 1986–87, most valuable player in 1986–87, and defensive rookie in 1984–85.

Undrafted by any NHL team, Desjardins joined the Concordia University team. In four years (1988 to 1992), he was on the all-star team each year and was the league most valuable player in 1990–91.

He turned pro in 1992–93 with the Wichita Thunder of the Central Hockey League, winning the rookie of the year award. After playing the next season with the Thunder and winning the Most Valuable Player Award, Desjardins retired in 1995.

== Awards ==
- 1984–85 Raymond Lagacé Trophy
- 1985–86 Jacques Plante Memorial Trophy
- 1986–87 Jacques Plante Memorial Trophy
- 1986–87 Michel Brière Memorial Trophy
- 1990–91 Ontario University Athletics Most Valuable Player
- 1992–93 Central Hockey League Rookie of the Year
- 1993–94 Central Hockey League Most Valuable Player
