= Wichita Thunder =

Professional minor league ice hockey team in Wichita, Kansas

- City: Wichita, Kansas
- League: ECHL
- Conference: Western
- Division: Mountain
- Founded: 1992 (in the CHL), 2014 (in the ECHL)
- Home arena: Intrust Bank Arena
- Colors: Blue, black, white
- Owners: Steven Brothers Sports Management (Rodney Steven, Brandon Steven, Johnny Steven)
- General manager: Joel Lomurno
- Head coach: Travis Clayton
- Captain: T.J. Lloyd
- Media: The Wichita Eagle; KAKE-TV; KWCH
- Affiliates: San Jose Sharks (NHL); San Jose Barracuda (AHL)
- Website: wichitathunder.com

Franchise history
- 1992–present: Wichita Thunder

Championships
- Regular season titles: 3 (1993–94, 1994–95, 2011–12)
- Conference titles: 2 (1997–98, 2011–12)
- Ray Miron President's Cup: 2 (1993–94, 1994–95)

The Wichita Thunder are a minor league hockey team based in Wichita, Kansas. The team played in the Central Hockey League from 1992 until 2014, and then in the ECHL since the 2014–15 season. From 1992 until December 2009, the Thunder played in the Britt Brown Arena located in the northern Wichita suburb of Park City. In January 2010 (the second half of the 2009–10 season), the team began playing its home games at the newly built Intrust Bank Arena. The Thunder are currently the ECHL affiliate of the San Jose Sharks.

== Franchise history ==
=== Central Hockey League ===
The Thunder was one of the first six original teams of the second iteration of the Central Hockey League, along with the Oklahoma City Blazers, Tulsa Oilers, Memphis RiverKings, Dallas Freeze and the Fort Worth Fire. Wichita played its first home game at Britt Brown Arena on November 4, 1992, in front of a crowd of 5,486. In the same season, the Thunder had its first sellout in team history when the crowd of 9,686 fans watched the Thunder defeat Oklahoma City 4–3.

The Thunder was originally coached by Gary Fay, but after a 6–20 start, he was replaced by Doug Shedden. The season was quickly turned around by Shedden, and it finished its first season with a 25–32–2 record. On April 5, 1993, the Thunder goaltender Robert Desjardins was named the first CHL Rookie of the Year. In the following two seasons, the Thunder was the regular season champion (Adams Cup) and playoff champion (William Levins Memorial Cup). Ron Handy was the Playoff Most Valuable Player for both seasons and was the only player in Central Hockey League history to win the award on multiple occasions. In the 1993–94 season, Doug Shedden won the Coach of the Year award, Robert Desjardins won the Regular Season Most Valuable Player award and Paul Jackson won the Scoring Champion award.

On May 14, 1995, Shedden resigned to become coach of the Louisiana IceGators of the East Coast Hockey League (ECHL). Don Jackson was hired as the new head coach on July 21, 1995. He led the Thunder to a 22–39–3 record and missed the playoffs for the second time in franchise history. On July 19, 1996, Jackson resigned to become head coach of the Kansas City Blades of the International Hockey League (IHL). Jackson was replaced by Bryan Wells to become the Thunder's fourth head coach in franchise history. Wells went on to coach the Thunder for five seasons, making the playoffs in four out of the five seasons he coached. On May 2, 2001, Wells was dismissed as head coach.

After the dismissal of Wells, the Thunder announced that James Latos would be the new head coach. In Latos' first season coaching, the team went 24–34–6 and was out of the playoffs. Latos was fired the following season after a disappointing start of 8–19–7. Five days after his dismissal, the Thunder announced that Derek Laxdal would become the team's new head coach. Laxdal went on to coach the Thunder for two seasons to an 87–58–8 record while securing two separate playoff places. On August 3, 2005, Laxdal announced his resignation to become the head coach of the ECHL's Idaho Steelheads.

Mark French took over as head coach from 2005 to 2007. During his tenure, he compiled a record of 70–59–16. He was fired mid-season in December 2007 with a 4–13 record. He went on to become the assistant coach of the AHL's Hershey Bears and the following season took them to a championship as head coach. The Thunder then named former player Rob Weingartner to lead the team. Weingartner played for the Thunder from 1992 to 1996 when he was a member of two championship teams. Weingartner compiled a record of 16–29–2 during his tenure. He has since become the head coach of the Western States Hockey League's Wichita Jr. Thunder.

Brent Bilodeau was hired during the 2008 off-season and led the team for two seasons and a record of 22–48–0. He was fired early in his second season and became the assistant coach of the Western Hockey League's Tri-City Americans for two seasons. After the Thunder fired Bilodeau nine games into the 2009–10 season, Jason Duda was given the job on an interim basis while on injured reserve. Duda owns several franchise records from his Thunder career, scoring 870 points in 14 seasons. He finished the season with a 7–43–5 record and became an assistant coach under the next head coach, Kevin McClelland.

=== ECHL ===
On October 7, 2014, soon before the 2014–15 CHL season was set to begin, it was announced that the Central Hockey League had ceased operations and the Thunder, along with the Allen Americans, Brampton Beast, Quad City Mallards, Missouri Mavericks, Rapid City Rush and Tulsa Oilers, were all approved for membership into the ECHL for the 2014–15 season. The team finished fifth out of seven teams in the Central Division, scoring 73 points out of 144.

On April 16, 2016, the Thunder announced that the team would not renew McClelland's contract for the 2016–17 season. He had been with the Thunder since 2010 and guided the team for six seasons becoming the longest tenured coach in Thunder history, leading the team for 408 games. During his time in Wichita, McClelland compiled a record of 194–166–48, earning a playoff spot in his first season and taking the team to the playoff finals in the following two seasons while still in the CHL. However, he failed to lead the team into the ECHL playoffs in his two seasons leading the team in the ECHL and the Thunder finished last in the overall standings in the 2015–16 season.

Malcolm Cameron was announced as the new head coach on May 20, 2016. One of his stated intentions in his opening press conference was to establish the Thunder's first NHL affiliation for the upcoming season. On July 4, 2016, the Ottawa Senators' assistant general manager, Randy Lee, said that his team was in negotiations for an affiliation with the Thunder for the 2016–17 season. The affiliation with the Senators and their American Hockey League affiliate, the Binghamton Senators, was finally confirmed on July 14. After one season, the Thunder changed affiliations to the Edmonton Oilers (NHL) and Bakersfield Condors (AHL). After three seasons, and one playoff appearance, Cameron was not offered an extension.

On May 15, 2019, the Thunder announced that the former Tulsa Oilers' head coach Bruce Ramsay would be Cameron's replacement.

Bruce Ramsay helped lead the Thunder to the playoffs during the shortened 2020-21 season. He was selected as the GM and Head Coach of the Year by the ECHL.

The Thunder joined into an affiliation with the NHL's San Jose Sharks and AHL's San Jose Barracuda before the 2022-23 season. The two teams continue to be partners and have seen growth with several players making their NHL debuts.

Ramsay helped the Thunder make the playoffs during the 2024-25 season. Wichita finished second in the Mountain Division, but was knocked out in the first round by the Tahoe Knight Monsters.

== Season-by-season records ==
Regular season												Playoffs				
Season	GP	W	L	T	OTL	SOL	Pts	GF	GA	PIM	Standing	Year	1st round	2nd round	3rd round	Finals
1992–93	60	25	33	—	0	2	52	242	320	1876	6th of 6, CHL	1993	—		did not qualify	
1993–94	64	40	18	6	—	—	86	309	275	2522	1st of 6, CHL	1994	—		W, 4–3, DAL	W, 4–0, TUL
1994–95	66	44	18	4	—	—	92	320	268	2513	1st of 7, CHL	1995	—		W, 4–1, OKC	W, 4–2, SA
1995–96	64	22	39	—	—	3	47	270	380	2304	6th of 6, CHL	1996	—		did not qualify	
1996–97	66	25	31	—	—	10	60	279	324	2660	4th of 5, Western Div.	1997	—	OKC	L, 1–4, FTW	—
1997–98	70	35	31	—	—	4	74	302	303	2321	2nd of 5, Western Div.	1998	—	W, 3–2, TUL	W, 4–3, OKC	L, 0–4, COL
1998–99	70	34	26	—	—	10	78	257	262	2158	3rd of 6, Western Div.	1999	—	L, 1–3, SA	—	—
1999–00	70	37	26	—	—	7	81	245	231	2049	2nd of 6, Western Div.	2000	—	L, 2–3, OKC	—	—
2000–01	70	30	32	—	—	8	68	251	251	2418	5th of 6, Western Div.	2001	—	did not qualify		
2001–02	64	24	34	—	—	6	54	203	262	1913	3rd of 4, Northwest Div.	2002	—	did not qualify		
2002–03	64	21	36	—	5	2	49	216	261	1837	4th of 4, Northwest Div.	2003	—	did not qualify		
2003–04	64	35	24	—	1	4	75	194	197	1558	2nd of 5, Northwest Div.	2004	—	W, 3–1, COL	L, 1–4, BS	—
2004–05	60	40	17	—	2	1	83	210	158	1784	2nd of 4, Northwest Div.	2005	—	W, 4–3, BS	L, 2–4, COL	—
2005–06	64	38	18	—	4	4	84	233	200	1841	2nd of 4, Northwest Div.	2006	—	L, 1–4, BS	—	—
2006–07	64	28	28	—	0	8	64	191	213	1841	3rd of 4, Northwest Div.	2007	L, 2–4, BS	—	—	—
2007–08	64	20	42	—	1	1	42	156	247	1905	5th of 5, Northwest Div.	2008	did not qualify			
2008–09	64	20	41	—	2	1	43	168	230	1419	4th of 4, Northwest Div.	2009	did not qualify			
2009–10	64	9	50	—	1	4	23	128	257	1354	7th of 7, Northern Conf.	2010	did not qualify			
2010–11	66	34	26	—	2	4	74	249	231	1189	5th of 9, Turner Conf.	2011	L, 2–3, MO	—	—	—
2011–12	66	44	19	—	1	2	91	231	181	1077	1st of 7, Berry Conf.	2012	—	W, 4–1, RGV	W, 4–2, TEX	L, 1–4, FW
2012–13	66	39	19	—	2	6	86	240	182	1106	2nd of 10, CHL	2013	—	W, 4–0, ARZ	W, 4–0, FTW	L, 3–4, ALN
2013–14	66	27	30	—	4	5	63	201	223	973	9th of 10, CHL	2014	—	did not qualify		
2014–15	72	32	31	—	2	7	73	213	240	1508	5th of 6, Central Div.	2015	did not qualify			
2015–16	72	18	41	—	7	6	49	150	240	1152	4th of 4, Central Div.	2016	did not qualify			
2016–17	72	21	44	—	6	1	49	189	278	1291	7th of 7, Central Div.	2017	did not qualify			
2017–18	72	34	30	—	6	2	76	222	235	1091	4th of 7, Mountain Div.	2018	L, 2–4, COL	—	—	—
2018–19	72	29	31	—	9	3	70	224	251	1286	5th of 7, Mountain Div.	2019	did not qualify			
2019–20	62	24	30	—	8	0	56	181	233	794	6th of 7, Mountain Div.	2020	Season cancelled due to the COVID-19 pandemic			
2020–21	71	41	22	—	6	2	90	218	190	985	2nd of 7, Western Conf.	2021	—	L, 2–3, FW	—	—
2021–22	72	27	36	—	9	0	63	202	258	1062	7th of 7, Mountain Div.	2022	did not qualify			
2022–23	72	33	32	—	6	1	73	227	238	1229	5th of 7, Mountain Div.	2023	did not qualify			
2023–24	72	27	35	—	9	1	64	220	271	881	7th of 7, Mountain Div.	2024	did not qualify			
2024–25	72	41	24	—	6	1	89	248	214	685	2nd of 7, Mountain Div.	2025	L, 0–4, TAH	—	—	—
2025–26	72	25	35	—	8	4	62	199	241	685	7th of 7, Mountain Div.	2026	did not qualify			

== Players ==
=== Retired numbers ===
- 9 - Ron Handy
- 11 - Jason Duda
- 15 - Rob Weingartner
- 35 - Robert Desjardins
- 38 - Travis Clayton

=== Notable NHL alumni ===
List of Wichita Thunder alumni who played more than 25 games in Wichita and 25 or more games in the National Hockey League:

- Vincent Desharnais
- Pierre-Cedric Labrie
- Theo Peckham
- Stuart Skinner
- Ryan White

== Leaders ==
=== Head coaches ===
Name	Year(s)	Record
Gary Fay	1992	6–20
Doug Shedden	1992–1995	103–49–12
Don Jackson	1995–1996	22–50–29
Bryan Wells	1996–2001	161–146–39
James Latos	2001–2003	32–53–13
Sean O'Reilly	Interim	1–0–0
Derek Laxdal	2003–2005	87–58–8
Mark French	2005–2007	70–56–16
Rob Weingartner	2007–2008	16–29–2
Brent Bilodeau	2008–2009	22–52
Jason Duda	Interim	7–40–4
Kevin McClelland	2010–2016	194–166–48
Malcolm Cameron	2016–2019	84–105–27
Bruce Ramsay	2019–2026	193-231-44
Travis Clayton	2026–present	

=== General managers ===
Name	Tenure
Bill Shuck	1992–2002
David Holt	2003–2005
Chris Presson	2005–2008
Joel Lomurno	2008–present

== Awards and trophies ==
The following lists the league awards which have been won by the Thunder team and its players.

=== ECHL ===
Most Valuable Player

- Anthony Beauregard: 2020–21

Coach of the Year

- Bruce Ramsay: 2020–21

General Manager of the Year

- Bruce Ramsay: 2020–21

Community Service Award

- Jeremy Beaudry: 2017–18

=== CHL ===
William Levins Memorial Cup

- 1993–94, 1994–95

Adams Cup

- 1993–94, 1994–95

Coach of the Year

- Doug Shedden: 1993–94
- Kevin McClelland: 2011–12

Joe Burton Award

- Jason Duda: 2004–05

Ken McKenzie Trophy

- Paul Jackson: 1993–94

Playoff Most Valuable Player

- Ron Handy: 1993–94, 1994–95

Most Outstanding Defenseman

- Paul Esdale: 2004–05
- Andrew Martens: 2010–11
- Kevin Young: 2012–13

Rick Kozuback Award

- Jason Duda: 2009–10

Rookie of the Year

- Robert Desjardins: 1992–93
- Cory Dosdall: 1996–97
- David Beauregard: 1997–98

All-Star Game Most Valuable Player (North)

- Joe Blaznek: 2005–06
