= Huntsville Channel Cats =

Ice hockey team in Huntsville, Alabama

- City: Huntsville, Alabama
- League: Southern Hockey League (1995–96); Central Hockey League (1996–2001); South East Hockey League (2003–04)
- Operated: 1995–2004
- Home arena: Von Braun Center
- Colors: teal, black, and white
- Head coach: Larry Floyd (1996–1998); Chris Stewart (1998–1999); Pat Bingham (1999–2000); Craig Coxe (2000–2001); Brad Gratton (2001); John Gibson (2003–2004)

Franchise history
- 1995–2000: Huntsville Channel Cats
- 2000–2001: Huntsville Tornado
- 2003–2004: Huntsville Channel Cats

Championships
- Regular season titles: 2003–04 (SEHL)
- Division titles: 1996–97 (CHL); 1998–99 (CHL)
- Playoff championships: 1995–96 President's Cup (SHL); 1998–99 Ray Miron President's Cup (CHL); 2003–04 President's Championship Cup (SEHL)

The Huntsville Channel Cats was a professional ice hockey team based in Huntsville, Alabama. The franchise was a member of several different leagues, the Southern Hockey League (1995–1996), the Central Hockey League (1996–2001) and the South East Hockey League (2003–2004). They played their home games at Von Braun Center Arena in downtown Huntsville.

== Early years (1995–1999) ==
In 1995, two doctors in Knoxville, Tennessee, John Staley and John Minchey, created a new hockey franchise in Huntsville to join the newly expanded Southern Hockey League. The Channel Cats won the league's first and only championship, as the SHL folded later that year. The Channel Cats then joined the Eastern Division of the Central Hockey League for the 1996–97 season. The Channel Cats remained with the CHL for five seasons winning the CHL championship (Ray Miron President's Cup) in 1999.

== New ownership (2000–2004) ==
Logo of the Huntsville Tornado (2000–2001)

Following the 1999 championship win the team was sold to a Boaz, Alabama, businessman, John Cherney. Cherney felt that the team had a bad name with the local business community and changed the name of the team to the Huntsville Tornado along with the team colors to red and white. Many fans took offense to the new name that referenced a tornado that struck South Huntsville in 1989, killing 21 people. The new 2000–01 seasons saw many fan favorites leave the team, and a drop down in the standings which resulted in a drop in attendance. Amid concerns over sharing arena space and weekend dates with the Alabama-Huntsville Chargers hockey team and the new NBDL Huntsville Flight basketball team, as well as the CHL's desire to contract to more south-central US markets, the team did not compete in the next two seasons. Cherney had also threatened to move the team to Madison, a suburb of Huntsville, if he did not get the dates he wanted, to no avail.

In 2002, Cherney became involved in the Atlantic Coast Hockey League (ACHL), but in 2003 founded a new league named the South East Hockey League (SEHL). After the formation of the league, he asked the Huntsville hockey community if he would re-establish a team what name they would like to see play, the Tornado or Channel Cats. The public responded with the Channel Cats. The Channel Cats were revived for the 2003–04 season and win the only SEHL league championship in the four-team league.

== End of a dynasty ==
Following the 2003–04 season, both the SEHL and World Hockey Association 2 (WHA2) fell into disarray. Keith Jeffries, president of HSV Sports, LLC and whose company had been contracted to run the Channel Cats front office during the 2003–04 season (and also operated the Tennessee Valley Vipers AF2 franchise) made a bid to have a new hockey team in the upstart Eastern Hockey League (later to be renamed the Southern Professional Hockey League before the league's first season) be placed in Huntsville. The new league would join teams from the now-defunct WHA2 and soon to be defunct SEHL. The Von Braun Center chose to accept the new franchise over the Cats, bringing an end to the Channel Cats name. Other teams from the SEHL soon followed Huntsville's lead and joined the SPHL as well. The new franchise was named the Huntsville Havoc, and successfully carried on the history of pro hockey in Huntsville.

== Year-by-year results ==
Season	League	GP	W	L	T	OTL	Pts	Pct	GF	GA	PIM	Coach	Finish	Playoffs
1995–96	SHL	60	25	31	2	0	56	0.467	274	294	2191	Larry Floyd	4th	Won championship, 4–1 (Winston-Salem)
1996–97	CHL	66	39	24	3	0	81	0.614	311	297	2111	Larry Floyd	1st, East	Lost in round 2, 2–4 (Memphis)
1997–98	CHL	70	40	22	8	0	88	0.629	333	281	2374	Larry Floyd	3rd, East	Lost in round 1, 0–3 (Nashville)
1998–99	CHL	70	47	19	0	4	98	0.671	310	251	2313	Chris Stewart	1st, East	Won championship, 4–2 (Oklahoma City)
1999–00	CHL	70	37	27	0	6	80	0.529	242	244	2350	Pat Bingham	3rd, East	Lost in round 1, 2–3 (Columbus)
2000–01 (Tornado)	CHL	70	31	36	0	3	65	0.443	217	275	1972	Craig Coxe (52 games); Kent Hawley (18 games)	5th, East	Did not qualify
2003–04	SEHL	56	43	13	0	0	86	0.768	233	164	1671	John Gibson	1st	Won championship, 3–0 (Knoxville)

== Records ==
=== Team ===
(as of the 2006–2007 season these records are tied with other teams or are still held by Huntsville)

Most consecutive wins in a season (Tied with other teams in the CHL)
12 1996–1997 Huntsville

Most penalty minutes (one team) in a game (CHL)
241: 11/05/1999 Huntsville

Most penalty minutes (both teams) in a game (CHL)
438: 11/05/1999 Fayetteville and Huntsville

=== Single-season ===
Goals: Chris George, 65 (98–99)
Assists: Jonathan DuBois, 92 (97–98)
Points: Jonathan DuBois, 129 (97–98)
Penalty minutes: Mike Degurse, 346 (97–98)
GAA: Matt Carmichael, 2.74 (03–04)
SV%: Matt Carmichael, .922 (03–04)
Wins: Derek Puppa, 39 (98–99)

=== Play-offs ===
Wins: Derek Puppa, 11 (98–99)

=== Career ===
Goals: Chris George, 234
Assists: Jonathan DuBois, 323
Points: Jonathan DuBois, 453
Penalty minutes: Mike Degurse, 1312
Goaltending wins: Matt Carmichael, 66
Shutouts: Brent Belecki, 3
Games: Chris George, 333

=== Retired numbers ===
Name	Number	Date
(Canada) Phil Daigle	21	November 8, 2003
(Canada) Mike Degurse	33	Retired by the Huntsville Havoc on November 4, 2006
(Canada) Chris George	17	January 4, 2004
(Canada) John Gibson	23	November 8, 2003
(Canada) Derek Puppa	30	End of the 1999 season and again on November 8, 2003

== Trivia ==
- Won at least one championship in each league of which it was a member.
- After their SHL win in 1996 until the end of the 1999–2000 season, before each game Huntsville, Alabama was referred to as "the hockey capital of the South".
- The mascot of the Huntsville Channel cats (and Huntsville Tornado) was a channel catfish named Finley. She wore a Huntsville Hockey jersey, gloves, helmet and ice skates.
- The Huntsville Channel Cats was featured on the nationally televised No Opportunity Wasted. On that show United States Postal Service letter carrier Mike Orsini lived his dream of playing professional hockey. The game was on March 17, 2004, and in 29 minutes of play as a goalie allowed only one goal and got the win. It was also the last regular season game played by the Channel Cats.

== Other Huntsville professional hockey teams ==
- Huntsville Blast (ECHL) 1993–1994
- Huntsville Havoc (SPHL) 2004–present
