= 1998–99 CHL season =

- League: Central Hockey League
- Sport: Ice hockey

Regular season
- Adams’ Cup: Oklahoma City Blazers
- Season MVP: Derek Puppa (Huntsville)
- Top scorer: Derek Grant (Memphis)

Finals
- Champions: Huntsville Channel Cats
- Runners-up: Oklahoma City Blazers

CHL seasons
- 1997–98 1999–00

The 1998–99 CHL season was the seventh season of the Central Hockey League (CHL).

== Teams ==
1998-99 Central Hockey League
Division	Team	City	Arena
Eastern	Columbus Cottonmouths	Columbus, Georgia	Columbus Civic Center
Eastern	Fayetteville Force	Fayetteville, North Carolina	Cumberland County Crown Coliseum
Eastern	Huntsville Channel Cats	Huntsville, Alabama	Von Braun Civic Center
Eastern	Macon Whoopee	Macon, Georgia	Macon Coliseum
Eastern	Memphis RiverKings	Memphis, Tennessee	Mid-South Coliseum
Western	Fort Worth Fire	Fort Worth, Texas	Fort Worth Convention Center
Western	Oklahoma City Blazers	Oklahoma City, Oklahoma	Myriad Convention Center
Western	San Antonio Iguanas	San Antonio, Texas	Freeman Coliseum
Western	Topeka Scarecrows	Topeka, Kansas	Landon Arena
Western	Tulsa Oilers	Tulsa, Oklahoma	Tulsa Coliseum
Western	Wichita Thunder	Wichita, Kansas	Britt Brown Arena

== Map of teams ==
Eastern Division Western Division

== Regular season ==
=== Division standings ===
Eastern Division	GP	W	L	SOL	GF	GA	Pts
Huntsville Channel Cats	70	47	19	4	310	251	98
Columbus Cottonmouths	70	41	21	8	276	210	91
Memphis RiverKings	70	36	27	7	313	307	79
Macon Whoopee	70	36	25	9	241	233	79
Fayetteville Force	70	35	27	8	267	285	78

Western Division	GP	W	L	SOL	GF	GA	Pts
Oklahoma City Blazers	70	49	19	2	322	203	100
San Antonio Iguanas	70	37	26	7	286	283	81
Wichita Thunder	70	34	26	10	257	262	78
Topeka Scarecrows	70	28	38	4	189	251	60
Fort Worth Fire	70	22	43	5	245	322	49
Tulsa Oilers	70	20	41	9	261	360	49

Note: GP = Games played; W = Wins; L = Losses; SOL = Shootout loss; Pts = Points; GF = Goals for; GA = Goals against

y - clinched league title; x - clinched playoff spot; e - eliminated from playoff contention

== Playoffs ==
=== Playoff bracket ===
Quarter Finals
1	Huntsville	3
4	Macon	0
Eastern
2	Columbus	3
3	Memphis	1
1	Oklahoma City	3
4	Topeka	0
Western
2	San Antonio	3
3	Wichita	1

Semi-Finals
1	Huntsville	4
2	Columbus	2
1	Oklahoma City	4
2	San Antonio	0

Championships
1	Huntsville	4
1	Oklahoma City	2

== CHL awards ==
Ray Miron Cup:	Huntsville Channel Cats
Adams Cup:	Oklahoma City Blazers
Coach of the Year:	Chris Stewart (Huntsville)
Most Valuable Player:	Derek Puppa (Huntsville)
Playoff Most Valuable Player:	Derek Puppa (Huntsville)
Most Outstanding Goaltender:	Jean-Ian Filiatrault (Oklahoma City)
Most Outstanding Defenseman	Igors Bondarevs (Huntsville)
Rookie of the Year	Johnny Brdarovic (San Antonio)
Scoring Champion	Derek Grant (Memphis)
Community Service Award	Mike Berger (Tulsa)
