= 1994–95 CHL season =

- League: Central Hockey League
- Sport: Ice hockey

Regular season
- Adams’ Cup: Wichita Thunder
- Season MVP: Paul Jackson (San Antonio)
- Top scorer: Brian Shantz (San Antonio)

Finals
- Champions: Wichita Thunder
- Runners-up: San Antonio Iguanas

CHL seasons
- 1993–94 1995–96

The 1994–95 CHL season was the third season of the Central Hockey League (CHL). Wichita Thunder won the championship by defeating San Antonio Iguanas. The top goal scorer was Brian Shantz from San Antonio Iguanas

== Teams ==
1994-95 Central Hockey League
Team	City	Arena
Dallas Freeze	Dallas, Texas	Fair Park Coliseum
Fort Worth Fire	Fort Worth, Texas	Fort Worth Convention Center
Memphis RiverKings	Memphis, Tennessee	Mid-South Coliseum
Oklahoma City Blazers	Oklahoma City, Oklahoma	Myriad Convention Center
San Antonio Iguanas	San Antonio, Texas	Freeman Coliseum
Tulsa Oilers	Tulsa, Oklahoma	Tulsa Coliseum
Wichita Thunder	Wichita, Kansas	Britt Brown Arena

== Map of teams ==
Central Hockey League teams

== Regular season ==
=== League standings ===
Central Hockey League	GP	W	L	T	GF	GA	Pts
y-Wichita Thunder	66	44	18	4	320	268	92
x-San Antonio Iguanas	66	37	22	7	336	281	81
x-Tulsa Oilers	66	36	24	6	307	281	78
x-Oklahoma City Blazers	66	34	23	9	274	267	77
e-Fort Worth Fire	66	32	26	8	314	288	72
e-Memphis Riverkings	66	24	35	7	259	327	55
e-Dallas Freeze	66	24	36	6	266	364	54

Note: y - clinched league title; x - clinched playoff spot; e - eliminated from playoff contention

== Playoffs ==
=== Playoff bracket ===
Ray Miron Cup first round
1	Wichita	4
4	Oklahoma City	1
2	San Antonio	4
3	Tulsa	3

Ray Miron Cup finals
1	Wichita	4
2	San Antonio	2

== CHL awards ==
Ray Miron Cup:	Wichita Thunder
Adams Cup:	Wichita Thunder
Coach of the Year:	John Torchetti (San Antonio)
Most Valuable Player:	Paul Jackson (San Antonio)
Playoff Most Valuable Player:	Ron Handy (Wichita)
Most Outstanding Goaltender:	Alan Perry (Oklahoma City)
Most Outstanding Defenseman	Eric Ricard (Fort Worth)
Rookie of the Year	Michael St. Jacques (Oklahoma City)
Scoring Champion	Brian Shantz (San Antonio)

== Player statistics ==
=== Scoring leaders ===
Note: GP = Games played; G = Goals; A = Assists; Pts = Points; PIM = Penalty minutes

Player	Team	GP	G	A	Pts	PIM
Brian Shantz	San Antonio Iguanas	66	39	80	119	125
George Dupont	Oklahoma City Blazers	65	27	78	105	250
Bob Berg	Wichita Thunder	66	55	46	101	122
Jim McGeough	Dallas Freeze	66	50	50	100	38
Paul Jackson	San Antonio Iguanas	53	51	49	100	251
Joe Burton	Oklahoma City Blazers	66	59	38	97	20
Bobby Wallwork	Memphis RiverKings	64	42	50	92	66
Dave Doucette	Wichita Thunder	64	20	70	90	81
Wayne Anchikoski	Dallas Freeze	53	32	50	82	36
Michel St. Jacques	Oklahoma City Blazers	64	48	33	81	52
John DePourcq	Wichita Thunder	59	28	53	81	10
