= Travis Clayton =

English American football player (born 2001)

No. 67 – Buffalo Bills
- Position: Defensive tackle
- Roster status: Practice squad

Personal information
- Born: 17 February 2001 (age 25); Basingstoke, England
- Listed height: 6 ft 7 in (2.01 m)
- Listed weight: 303 lb (137 kg)

Career information
- NFL draft: 2024: 7th round, 221st overall pick

Career history
- Buffalo Bills (2024–present)
- Stats at Pro Football Reference

Travis Clayton (born 17 February 2001) is an English professional American football defensive tackle for the Buffalo Bills of the National Football League (NFL). He played rugby union in England and joined the NFL as part of the International Player Pathway Program (IPPP), being selected by the Bills in the seventh round of the 2024 NFL draft.

== Early life ==
Clayton grew up in Basingstoke, Hampshire, in England. He played a number of sports growing up, including association football, rowing and boxing, before later focusing on rugby union. He played football as a member of the Fulham Academy and later had stints with Reading, Southampton and Chelsea. He later joined Basingstoke R.F.C., a team in the eighth tier of the English rugby union system.

== American football career ==
Clayton had first tried out American football in 2019, spending time with the newly started NFL Academy in London, although he left the program soon after. Four years later, he decided to give the sport another shot. He rejoined the academy and after success there, was chosen in January 2024 as one of 16 participants in the National Football League's International Player Pathway Program (IPPP), designed to give international players more opportunities to play in the league.

Pre-draft measurables
Height	Weight	Arm length	Hand span	Wingspan	40-yard dash	10-yard split	20-yard split	Vertical jump	Bench press
6 ft 7 in (2.01 m)	301 lb (137 kg)	35 in (0.89 m)	10 in (0.25 m)	7 ft 0 in (2.13 m)	4.81 s	1.68 s	2.81 s	26.0 in (0.66 m)	19 reps
All values from Pro Day

Clayton spent ten weeks learning the sport while training at IMG Academy. He received praise for his pro day performance, measuring at 6 feet 7 inches (2.01 m) and 301 pounds (137 kg; 21.5 st) with a 7-foot (2.1 m) wingspan, while running the 40-yard dash in 4.81 seconds. His 40-yard dash time was better than any offensive lineman at the NFL Scouting Combine. He was invited to tryout with several teams and received comparisons to Jordan Mailata, an Australian rugby league player who became a starter for the Philadelphia Eagles. Unlike other IPPP participants such as Louis Rees-Zammit, Clayton was eligible for the 2024 NFL draft due to being within four years of having graduated high school. Although never having played in a game of American football before, he was chosen in the seventh round of the draft – 221st overall – by the Buffalo Bills, becoming the second-ever IPPP participant to be drafted after Mailata. He was placed on injured reserve on August 27, 2024.

On August 26, 2025, Clayton was released by the Bills as part of final roster cuts and re-signed to the practice squad the next day. On January 19, 2026, he signed a reserve/futures contract with Buffalo. For the 2026 season, Clayton switched positions and began to work on the defensive line.

On August 30, 2026, Clayton was waived by the Bills as a part of final roster cuts; he was re-signed to the team's practice squad the next day.
