= 2000–01 CHL season =

- League: Central Hockey League
- Sport: Ice hockey

Regular season
- Adams’ Cup: Memphis RiverKings

Finals
- Champions: Oklahoma City Blazers
- Runners-up: Columbus Cottonmouths

CHL seasons
- 1999–00 2001–02

The 2000–01 CHL season was the ninth season of the Central Hockey League (CHL).

== Teams ==
2000-01 Central Hockey League
Division	Team	City	Arena
Eastern	Columbus Cottonmouths	Columbus, Georgia	Columbus Civic Center
Eastern	Fayetteville Force	Fayetteville, North Carolina	Cumberland County Crown Coliseum
Eastern	Huntsville Tornado	Huntsville, Alabama	Von Braun Center
Eastern	Indianapolis Ice	Indianapolis, Indiana	Pepsi Coliseum
Eastern	Macon Whoopee	Macon, Georgia	Macon Coliseum
Eastern	Memphis RiverKings	Southaven, Mississippi	DeSoto Civic Center
Western	Border City Bandits	Texarkana, Arkansas	Four States Arena
Western	Oklahoma City Blazers	Oklahoma City, Oklahoma	Myriad Convention Center
Western	San Antonio Iguanas	San Antonio, Texas	Freeman Coliseum
Western	Topeka Scarecrows	Topeka, Kansas	Landon Arena
Western	Tulsa Oilers	Tulsa, Oklahoma	Tulsa Coliseum
Western	Wichita Thunder	Wichita, Kansas	Britt Brown Arena

== Map of teams ==
Eastern Division Western Division

== Regular season ==
=== Division standings ===
Eastern Division	GP	W	L	SOL	GF	GA	Pts
Memphis RiverKings	70	43	21	6	296	236	92
Columbus Cottonmouths	70	41	21	8	248	199	90
Fayetteville Force	70	31	30	9	216	243	71
Indianapolis Ice	70	31	32	7	239	260	69
Huntsville Tornado	70	31	36	3	217	275	65
Macon Whoopee	70	23	36	11	218	262	57

Western Division	GP	W	L	SOL	GF	GA	Pts
Oklahoma City Blazers	70	48	19	3	273	185	99
San Antonio Iguanas	70	42	21	7	288	229	91
Topeka Scarecrows	69	38	23	8	256	245	84
Tulsa Oilers	70	36	26	8	259	250	80
Wichita Thunder	70	30	32	8	251	251	68
Border City Bandits	51	11	36	4	132	283	26

Note: GP = Games played; W = Wins; L = Losses; SOL = Shootout loss; Pts = Points; GF = Goals for; GA = Goals against

y - clinched league title; x - clinched playoff spot; e - eliminated from playoff contention

== Playoffs ==
=== Playoff bracket ===
Quarter Finals
1	Memphis	3
4	Indianapolis	0
Eastern
2	Columbus	3
3	Fayetteville	2
1	Oklahoma City	3
4	Tulsa	0
Western
2	San Antonio	3
3	Topeka	2

Semi-finals
1	Memphis	1
2	Columbus	3
1	Oklahoma City	3
2	San Antonio	2

Championships
2	Columbus	1
1	Oklahoma City	4

== CHL awards ==
Ray Miron Cup:	Oklahoma City Blazers
Adams Cup (regular-season champions)	Oklahoma City Blazers
Coach of the Year:	Paul Kelly (Topeka)
Most Valuable Player:	Joe Burton (Oklahoma City)
Playoff Most Valuable Player:	Rod Branch (Tulsa)
Most Outstanding Goaltender:	Brant Nicklin (Tulsa)
Most Outstanding Defenseman	Derek Landmesser (Memphis)
Rookie of the Year	Derek Reynolds (Huntsville)
Scoring Champion	Yvan Corbin (Indianapolis)
Community Service Award	Andy Powers (Columbus)
