= 1999–2000 CHL season =

- League: Central Hockey League
- Sport: Ice hockey

Regular season
- Adams’ Cup: Fayetteville Force
- Season MVP: Chris MacKenzie & Yvan Corbin

Finals
- Champions: Indianapolis Ice

CHL seasons
- 1998–99 2000–01

The 1999–2000 CHL season was the eighth season of the Central Hockey League (CHL).

== Teams ==
1999-2000 Central Hockey League
Division	Team	City	Arena
Eastern	Columbus Cottonmouths	Columbus, Georgia	Columbus Civic Center
Eastern	Fayetteville Force	Fayetteville, North Carolina	Cumberland County Crown Coliseum
Eastern	Huntsville Channel Cats	Huntsville, Alabama	Von Braun Civic Center
Eastern	Macon Whoopee	Macon, Georgia	Macon Coliseum
Eastern	Memphis RiverKings	Memphis, Tennessee	Mid-South Coliseum
Western	Indianapolis Ice	Indianapolis, Indiana	Pepsi Coliseum
Western	Oklahoma City Blazers	Oklahoma City, Oklahoma	Myriad Convention Center
Western	San Antonio Iguanas	San Antonio, Texas	Freeman Coliseum
Western	Topeka Scarecrows	Topeka, Kansas	Landon Arena
Western	Tulsa Oilers	Tulsa, Oklahoma	Tulsa Coliseum
Western	Wichita Thunder	Wichita, Kansas	Britt Brown Arena

== Map of teams ==
Eastern Division Western Division

== Regular season ==
=== Division standings ===
Eastern Division	GP	W	L	SOL	GF	GA	Pts
Fayetteville Force	70	45	22	3	255	202	93
Columbus Cottonmouths	70	39	20	11	233	203	89
Huntsville Channel Cats	70	37	27	6	242	244	80
Macon Whoopee	70	34	26	10	259	237	78
Memphis RiverKings	70	9	57	4	175	341	22

Western Division	GP	W	L	SOL	GF	GA	Pts
Oklahoma City Blazers	70	39	24	7	248	220	85
Indianapolis Ice	70	39	28	3	290	244	81
Tulsa Oilers	70	38	27	5	251	244	81
Wichita Thunder	70	37	26	7	245	231	81
Topeka Scarecrows	70	35	27	8	245	243	78
San Antonio Iguanas	70	33	32	5	229	263	71

Note: GP = Games played; W = Wins; L = Losses; SOL = Shootout loss; Pts = Points; GF = Goals for; GA = Goals against

y - clinched league title; x - clinched playoff spot; e - eliminated from playoff contention

== Playoffs ==
=== Playoff bracket ===
Quarter Finals
1	Fayetteville	1
4	Macon	3
Eastern
2	Columbus	3
3	Huntsville	2
1	Oklahoma City	3
4	Wichita	2
Western
2	Indianapolis	3
3	Tulsa	2

Semi-Finals
2	Columbus	3
4	Macon	1
1	Oklahoma City	0
2	Indianapolis	3

Championships
2	Columbus	3
2	Indianapolis	4

== CHL awards ==
William "Bill" Levins Memorial Cup:	Indianapolis Ice
Adams Cup:	Fayetteville Force
Coach of the Year:	David Lohrei (Fayetteville)
Most Valuable Player:	Chris MacKenzie & Yvan Corbin (Indianapolis)
Playoff Most Valuable Player:	Jamie Morris (Indianapolis)
Most Outstanding Goaltender:	Frankie Ouellette (Columbus)
Most Outstanding Defenseman	Brett Colborne (Fayetteville)
Rookie of the Year	James Patterson (Huntsville)
Scoring Champion	Chris MacKenzie (Indianapolis)
Community Service Award	Jerome Bechard (Columbus)
