= 1996–97 CHL season =

- League: Central Hockey League
- Sport: Ice hockey

Regular season
- Adams’ Cup: Oklahoma City Blazers
- Season MVP: Trevor Jobe (Columbus)
- Top scorer: Trevor Jobe (Columbus)

Finals
- Champions: Fort Worth Fire
- Runners-up: Memphis Riverkings

CHL seasons
- 1995–96 1997–98

The 1996–97 CHL season was the fifth season of the Central Hockey League (CHL).

== Teams ==
1996–97 Central Hockey League
| Division | Team | City | Arena |
| Eastern | Columbus Cottonmouths | Columbus, Georgia | Columbus Civic Center |
| Eastern | Huntsville Channel Cats | Huntsville, Alabama | Von Braun Civic Center |
| Eastern | Macon Whoopee | Macon, Georgia | Macon Coliseum |
| Eastern | Memphis RiverKings | Memphis, Tennessee | Mid-South Coliseum |
| Eastern | Nashville Nighthawks | Nashville, Tennessee | Nashville Municipal Auditorium |
| Western | Fort Worth Fire | Fort Worth, Texas | Fort Worth Convention Center |
| Western | Oklahoma City Blazers | Oklahoma City, Oklahoma | Myriad Convention Center |
| Western | San Antonio Iguanas | San Antonio, Texas | Freeman Coliseum |
| Western | Tulsa Oilers | Tulsa, Oklahoma | Tulsa Coliseum |
| Western | Wichita Thunder | Wichita, Kansas | Britt Brown Arena |

== Map of teams ==
Eastern Division Western Division

== Regular season ==
=== Division standings ===
| Eastern Division | GP | W | L | SOL | GF | GA | Pts |
|---|---|---|---|---|---|---|---|
| x-Huntsville Channel Cats | 66 | 39 | 24 | 3 | 311 | 297 | 81 |
| x-Macon Whoopee | 66 | 38 | 24 | 4 | 276 | 237 | 80 |
| x-Memphis RiverKings | 66 | 35 | 27 | 4 | 278 | 260 | 74 |
| x-Columbus Cottonmouths | 66 | 32 | 28 | 6 | 292 | 291 | 70 |
| e-Nashville Nighthawks | 66 | 12 | 52 | 2 | 219 | 359 | 26 |

| Western Division | GP | W | L | SOL | GF | GA | Pts |
|---|---|---|---|---|---|---|---|
| y-Oklahoma City Blazers | 66 | 48 | 12 | 6 | 307 | 200 | 102 |
| x-Fort Worth Fire | 66 | 43 | 16 | 5 | 279 | 210 | 95 |
| x-Tulsa Oilers | 66 | 30 | 32 | 4 | 286 | 284 | 64 |
| x-Wichita Thunder | 66 | 25 | 31 | 10 | 279 | 324 | 60 |
| e-San Antonio Iguanas | 66 | 26 | 36 | 4 | 261 | 326 | 56 |

y – clinched league title; x – clinched playoff spot; e – eliminated from playoff contention

== Playoffs ==
=== Playoff Bracket ===
Quarter Finals
1 | Huntsville | 3
4 | Columbus | 0
Eastern
2 | Macon | 2
3 | Memphis | 3
1 | Oklahoma City | 1
4 | Wichita | 3
Western
2 | Fort Worth | 3
3 | Tulsa | 2

Semi-Finals
1 | Huntsville | 2
3 | Memphis | 4
2 | Fort Worth | 4
4 | Wichita | 1

Championships
2 | Fort Worth | 4
3 | Memphis | 3

== CHL awards ==
| Ray Miron Cup: | Fort Worth Fire |
| Adams Cup: | Oklahoma City Blazers |
| Coach of the Year: | Bill McDonald (Fort Worth) |
| Most Valuable Player: | Trevor Jobe (Columbus) |
| Playoff Most Valuable Player: | Steve Plouffe (Fort Worth) |
| Most Outstanding Goaltender: | Jean-Ian Filiatrault (Oklahoma City) |
| Most Outstanding Defenseman | Hardy Sauter (Oklahoma City) |
| Rookie of the Year | Cory Dosdall (Wichita) |
| Scoring Champion | Trevor Jobe (Columbus) |

== Player statistics ==
=== Scoring leaders ===
Note: GP = Games played; G = Goals; A = Assists; Pts = Points; PIM = Penalty minutes

| Player | Team | GP | G | A | Pts | PIM |
|---|---|---|---|---|---|---|
| Trevor Jobe | Wichita Thunder; Columbus Cottonmouths | 61 | 61 | 73 | 134 | 139 |
| Doug Lawrence | Tulsa Oilers | 66 | 27 | 100 | 127 | 250 |
| Terry Menard | Fort Worth Fire | 63 | 50 | 65 | 115 | 138 |
| Marcel Richard | Columbus Cottonmouths | 63 | 51 | 58 | 109 | 74 |
| Randy Murphy | Columbus Cottonmouths | 65 | 36 | 69 | 105 | 42 |
| Hardy Sauter | Oklahoma City Blazers | 66 | 32 | 69 | 101 | 54 |
| Alex Kholomeyev | Huntsville Channel Cats | 57 | 37 | 58 | 95 | 90 |
| Luc Beausoleil | Tulsa Oilers | 62 | 60 | 35 | 95 | 57 |
| Bruno Villeneuve | Memphis RiverKings | 66 | 49 | 46 | 95 | 14 |
| Joe Burton | Oklahoma City Blazers | 65 | 53 | 41 | 94 | 39 |
