= Paul Jackson (ice hockey) =

Canadian ice hockey player

- Born: August 1, 1940 (age 84); Peterborough, Ontario, Canada
- Height: 5 ft 11 in (180 cm)
- Weight: 181 lb (82 kg; 12 st 13 lb)
- Position: Defence
- Shot: Right
- Played for: AHL; Pittsburgh Hornets; Buffalo Bisons; Springfield Kings; IHL; Columbus Checkers; WHL; San Francisco Seals
- NHL draft: Undrafted
- Playing career: 1961–1969

Paul Jackson (born August 1, 1940) is a Canadian former professional ice hockey defenceman.

Jackson played major junior ice hockey in the Ontario Hockey League, and was a member of the Toronto St. Michael's Majors when they won the Memorial Cup in 1961. The following season he turned professional, playing the 1961–62 AHL season with the Pittsburgh Hornets.
