= San Antonio Iguanas =

- City: San Antonio, Texas
- League: Central Hockey League
- Founded: 1994
- Home arena: Freeman Coliseum
- Colors: Orange, Purple

Franchise history
- 1994–1997, 1998–2002: San Antonio Iguanas

The San Antonio Iguanas were a minor league professional ice hockey team based in San Antonio, Texas. The first expansion team in the Central Hockey League, they were active for seven seasons from 1994 to 1997 and 1998–2002. The team was started by Horn Chen, the founder of the Central Hockey League. in 1994 and was sold to Elmore Sports Group in 1998. Their home arena was the Freeman Coliseum. Bill Goldsworthy initially coached the team but stepped down for health reasons after only ten games. John Torchetti took over coaching duties, leading the Iguanas to the CHL finals in both of their first two years.

The team ceased operations after failing to find local investors following the introduction of the San Antonio Rampage—which resulted from a joint partnership between the Spurs and the Florida Panthers.

== Season results ==
Season	Division	GP	W	L	T	OTL	SOL	Pts	Pct	GF	GA	PIM	Coach	Playoffs Result
1994–95	N/A	66	37	22	7	0	0	81	0.614	336	281	2353	Bill Goldsworthy; John Torchetti	Lost to Wichita Thunder in Finals (4–2)
1995–96	N/A	64	39	17	0	0	8	86	0.672	313	240	2340	John Torchetti	Lost to Oklahoma City Blazers in Finals (4–3)
1996–97	Western	66	26	36	0	0	4	56	0.424	261	326	2539	Ric Seiling; Dale Henry	Did not qualify
1998–99	Western	70	37	26	0	0	7	81	0.579	286	283	2128	Todd Gordon	Lost in round 2
1999–00	Western	70	33	32	0	0	5	71	0.507	229	263	2070	Chris Stewart	Did not qualify
2000–01	Western	70	42	21	0	0	7	91	0.650	288	229	1957	Chris Stewart	Lost in round 2
2001–02	Southeast	64	40	16	0	0	8	88	0.688	243	183	1925	Chris Stewart	Lost in round 1

(Jim Goodman was the general manager)
