= 1997–98 CHL season =

- League: Central Hockey League
- Sport: Ice hockey

Regular season
- Adams’ Cup: Columbus Cottonmouths
- Season MVP: Joe Burton (Oklahoma City)
- Top scorer: Luc Beausoleil (Tulsa)

Finals
- Champions: Columbus Cottonmouths
- Runners-up: Wichita Thunder

CHL seasons
- 1996–97 1998–99

The 1997–98 CHL season was the sixth season of the Central Hockey League (CHL).

== Teams ==
1997-98 Central Hockey League
Division	Team	City	Arena
Eastern	Columbus Cottonmouths	Columbus, Georgia	Columbus Civic Center
Eastern	Fayetteville Force	Fayetteville, North Carolina	Cumberland County Crown Coliseum
Eastern	Huntsville Channel Cats	Huntsville, Alabama	Von Braun Civic Center
Eastern	Macon Whoopee	Macon, Georgia	Macon Coliseum
Eastern	Nashville Ice Flyers	Nashville, Tennessee	Nashville Municipal Auditorium
Western	Fort Worth Fire	Fort Worth, Texas	Fort Worth Convention Center
Western	Memphis RiverKings	Memphis, Tennessee	Mid-South Coliseum
Western	Oklahoma City Blazers	Oklahoma City, Oklahoma	Myriad Convention Center
Western	Tulsa Oilers	Tulsa, Oklahoma	Tulsa Coliseum
Western	Wichita Thunder	Wichita, Kansas	Britt Brown Arena

== Map of teams ==
Eastern Division Western Division

== Regular season ==
=== Division standings ===
Eastern Division	GP	W	L	T	GF	GA	Pts
y-Columbus Cottonmouths	70	51	13	6	341	219	108
x-Nashville Ice Flyers	70	41	19	10	274	246	92
x-Huntsville Channel Cats	70	40	22	8	333	281	88
x-Macon Whoopee	70	38	25	7	249	234	83
e-Fayetteville Force	70	25	42	3	247	348	53

Western Division	GP	W	L	T	GF	GA	Pts
x-Oklahoma City Blazers	70	48	19	3	319	237	99
x-Wichita Thunder	70	35	31	4	302	303	74
x-Tulsa Oilers	70	34	31	5	308	274	73
x-Memphis RiverKings	70	25	40	5	239	287	55
e-Fort Worth Fire	70	13	53	4	214	397	30

y - clinched league title; x - clinched playoff spot; e - eliminated from playoff contention

== Playoffs ==
=== Playoff bracket ===
Quarter Finals
1	Columbus	3
4	Macon	0
Eastern
2	Nashville	3
3	Huntsville	0
1	Oklahoma City	3
4	Memphis	1
Western
2	Wichita	3
3	Tulsa	1

Semi-Finals
1	Columbus	4
2	Nashville	2
1	Oklahoma City	3
2	Wichita	4

Championships
1	Columbus	4
2	Wichita	0

== CHL awards ==
William “Bill” Levins Memorial Cup:	Columbus Cottonmouths
Adams Cup:	Columbus Cottonmouths
Coach of the Year:	David Lohrei (Nashville)
Most Valuable Player:	Joe Burton (Oklahoma City)
Playoff Most Valuable Player:	Mike Martens (Columbus)
Most Outstanding Goaltender:	Brian Elder (Oklahoma City)
Most Outstanding Defenseman	Hardy Sauter (Oklahoma City)
Rookie of the Year	David Beauregard (Wichita)
Scoring Champion	Luc Beausoleil (Tulsa)
Community Service Award	Rod Branch (Tulsa)
