= Tulsa Oilers =

American minor professional ice hockey team

- City: Tulsa, Oklahoma
- League: ECHL
- Conference: Western
- Division: Mountain
- Founded: 1992 (in the CHL)
- Home arena: BOK Center
- Colors: Navy blue, maroon, silver, white
- Owners: NL Sports, LLC (Andy Scurto)
- General manager: Taylor Hall
- Head coach: Rob Murray
- Affiliates: Anaheim Ducks (NHL); San Diego Gulls (AHL)
- Website: tulsaoilers.com

Franchise history
- 1992–present: Tulsa Oilers

Championships
- Division titles: 1 (2018–19)
- Ray Miron President's Cup: 1 (1993)

The Tulsa Oilers are a professional ice hockey team based in Tulsa, Oklahoma, and play in the ECHL. The Oilers played their home games at the Tulsa Convention Center until 2008 when they moved into the new BOK Center. For many years, the Tulsa Oilers name was shared with Tulsa's former minor-league baseball team that pre-dated the Tulsa Drillers. To reduce confusion in local news reporting, the hockey team was often called the "Ice Oilers".

Formerly a member of the Central Hockey League, the Oilers are one of only two teams which played every one of the CHL's 22 seasons (the other being the Wichita Thunder). The Oilers established a winning tradition, making the playoffs in nine of their first 13 seasons. However, their performance in recent years has been less successful making the playoffs four times since 2005.

Original owner Jeff Lund played an integral part in assembling the 1992–93 team, led by veteran minor league coach and former NHL ironman Garry Unger. The team, anchored by high-scoring forward Sylvain Naud and veteran goalie Tony Martino, finished the regular season in second place, right behind intrastate rival Oklahoma City Blazers. However, in the revived league's first championship series the Oilers handily defeated the Blazers, clinching the title on OKC's home ice. Lund assumed ownership of the franchise in February 1999 after being the team's general manager.

On June 23, 2013, Lund sold the team to the owners of the Wichita Thunder, the Steven brothers. The Steven brothers sold the team to Andy Scurto in 2021.

== History ==
Tulsa has previously had several other hockey teams named the "Oilers."

Tulsa Oilers (1968)

The original Oilers joined the five team American Hockey Association as an expansion team in 1928. Their first home game was January 1, 1929, against the Duluth Hornets, as part of the grand opening of the Tulsa Coliseum. The team won the AHA championship that season, and again in the 1930–31 season. For the 1932–33 season, the Oilers moved to St. Paul, Minnesota, and became the St. Paul Greyhounds, but halfway through the season they moved back to Tulsa once again becoming the Tulsa Oilers. At the end of the 1941–42 season, the AHA and the Oilers disbanded due to World War II. Hockey Hall of Fame members Duke Keats and Bill Cowley played for short periods on the Tulsa Oilers during this period.

The AHA was reorganized as the United States Hockey League for the 1945–46 season as a seven team league, once again including the Oilers. That league folded after the 1950–51 season. The team played at Avey's Coliseum during this time. Hockey Hall of Fame member Clint Smith played the 1947–48 season with the Tulsa Oilers after a stellar 11-year career in the NHL with the New York Rangers and Chicago Black Hawks and won the USHL Most Valuable Player Award.

Tulsa Oilers (2006–2013)

Tulsa Oilers (1972–1982)

In 1964, a new Tulsa Oilers team joined the Central Professional Hockey League (later shortened to Central Hockey League) in its second season of operation. The Oilers won the Adams Cup as the CPHL/CHL champions in 1968, 1976, and 1984. The Oilers played in the CHL until 1984 when the league folded.

=== 1992–2014 (CHL) ===
A new Central Hockey League was created in 1992 as a centrally owned league, owned by Ray Miron and Bill Levins. The league was operated by Ray and Monte Miron and funded by Chicago businessman and minor league sports entrepreneur Horn Chen. With the creation of the new CHL the Tulsa Oilers were a team once again. Ray Miron once coached the Oilers in the old CHL and his son Monte had played for the Oilers in 1973–74. Tulsa claimed the CHL championship in the CHL's inaugural season under general manager Jeff Lund and head coach Garry Unger.

The Oilers established a winning tradition, making the playoffs in nine of their first 13 seasons. However, with a decline in their performance and not qualifying for the playoffs since 2005 nor winning a playoff series since 1994, Lund hired former player Taylor Hall as the Oilers' general manager on May 3, 2008. After finishing third to last in the CHL with 18 wins in 64 games in the 2008–09 season, Hall hired head coach Bruce Ramsay, fresh off a trip to the IHL's Turner Cup finals with the Muskegon Fury, on May 21, 2009.

In Ramsay's first season as coach in 2009–10 season, the Oilers rebounded with 28 wins in 64 games to post the second highest point total increase in the CHL from the previous season. On September 2, 2010, the Oilers announced their first National Hockey League affiliation since their reformation in 1992 with the Colorado Avalanche, joining the Lake Erie Monsters of the AHL.

=== 2014–present (ECHL) ===
On October 7, 2014, soon before the 2014–15 Central Hockey League season was set to begin, it was announced that the league had ceased operations and the Oilers, along with the Allen Americans, Brampton Beast, Quad City Mallards, Missouri Mavericks, Rapid City Rush and Wichita Thunder, were all approved the expansion membership application into the ECHL for the 2014–15 season.

On July 31, 2015, the Oilers announced a one-year affiliation with the NHL's Winnipeg Jets and the AHL's Manitoba Moose. After the conclusion of the agreement with the Jets/Moose, the Oilers announced a one-year affiliation with the St. Louis Blues of the NHL, which did not have an AHL affiliate, for the 2017–18 season. The affiliation was extended for another season in 2018–19, but also added the San Antonio Rampage, the Blues' new AHL affiliate. The Oilers and Blues continued the affiliation for the 2019–20 season, followed by the Oilers reaching a three-year affiliation agreement with the Anaheim Ducks starting with the 2020–21 season.

In 2021, the Steven brothers sold the team to Andy Scurto and his company NL Sports, LLC, which also had recently purchased the Buffalo Beauts and Minnesota Whitecaps in the Premier Hockey Federation.

== Season records ==
Season	GP	W	L	T	OTL	SOL	PTS	GF	GA	PIM	Regular season finish (Division/conference)	Playoffs
Central Hockey League
1992–93	60	35	22	—	1	2	73	270	230	1430	2nd of 6, CHL	Won championship, 4–1 vs. Oklahoma City Blazers
1993–94	64	36	24	4	—	—	76	347	281	1703	2nd of 6, CHL	Lost finals, 0–4 vs. Wichita Thunder
1994–95	66	36	24	6	—	—	78	307	281	1373	3rd of 7, CHL	Lost semifinals, 3–4 vs. San Antonio Iguanas
1995–96	64	26	33	—	—	5	57	244	302	1446	4th of 6, CHL	Lost semifinals, 2–4 vs. Oklahoma City Blazers
1996–97	66	30	32	—	—	4	64	286	284	1552	3rd of 5, Western Division	Lost quarterfinals, 2–3 vs. Fort Worth Fire
1997–98	70	34	31	—	—	5	73	308	274	2557	3rd of 5, Western Division	Lost quarterfinals, 1–3 vs. Wichita Thunder
1998–99	70	20	41	—	—	9	49	261	360	2276	6th of 6, Western Division	did not qualify
1999–00	70	38	27	—	—	5	81	251	244	2325	3rd of 6, Western Division	Lost quarterfinals, 2–3 vs. Indianapolis Ice
2000–01	70	36	26	—	—	8	80	259	250	2030	5th of 6, Western Division	Lost quarterfinals, 0–3 vs. Oklahoma City Blazers
2001–02	64	30	30	—	—	4	64	204	215	1701	2nd of 4, Northwest Division	did not qualify
2002–03	64	37	22	—	3	2	79	218	195	1704	3rd of 4, Northwest Division	did not qualify
2003–04	64	26	25	—	4	9	65	194	210	1198	4th of 5, Northwest Division	did not qualify
2004–05	60	32	25	—	1	2	67	206	210	1307	2nd of 5, Northeast Division	Lost conf. semifinals, 1–4 vs. Colorado Eagles
2005–06	64	29	28	—	4	3	65	209	227	1687	4th of 4, Northwest Division	did not qualify
2006–07	64	27	28	—	6	3	63	225	246	2044	4th of 4, Northeast Division	did not qualify
2007–08	64	25	35	—	3	1	54	194	243	1438	4th of 5, Northwest Division	did not qualify
2008–09	64	18	38	—	3	5	44	179	270	1668	4th of 4, Northeast Division	did not qualify
2009–10	64	28	29	—	4	3	63	203	230	1576	6th of 7, Northern Conference	did not qualify
2010–11	66	35	25	—	5	1	76	242	234	1063	3rd of 9, Berry Conference	Lost conf. semifinals, 2–3 vs. Bossier-Shreveport Mudbugs
2011–12	66	29	29	—	7	1	66	207	222	1000	5th of 7, Berry Conference	did not qualify
2012–13	66	22	39	—	3	2	49	177	254	897	10th of 10, CHL	did not qualify
2013–14	66	34	29	—	0	3	71	225	215	1170	7th of 10, CHL	Lost quarterfinals, 2–4 vs. Denver Cutthroats
ECHL
2014–15	72	37	29	—	3	3	80	248	244	1350	4th of 7, Central Division	Lost div. semifinals, 1–4 vs. Allen Americans
2015–16	72	37	30	—	3	2	79	191	191	1083	3rd of 4, Central Division	did not qualify
2016–17	72	27	37	—	6	2	62	194	241	1247	5th of 7, Central Division	did not qualify
2017–18	72	31	29	—	3	9	74	214	233	1230	5th of 7, Mountain Division	did not qualify
2018–19	72	42	24	—	4	2	90	236	198	964	1st of 7, Mountain Division	Lost conf. finals, 3–4 vs. Toledo Walleye
2019–20	63	29	26	—	7	1	66	199	196	727	4th of 7, Mountain Division	Season cancelled
2020–21	72	30	28	—	11	3	74	180	203	871	5th of 7, Western Conference	did not qualify
2021–22	72	36	30	—	3	3	78	220	220	753	4th of 7, Mountain Division	Lost div. semifinals, 3–4 vs. Utah Grizzlies
2022–23	72	22	41	—	8	1	53	203	279	961	7th of 7, Mountain Division	did not qualify
2023–24	72	30	33	—	8	1	69	222	233	814	4th of 7, Mountain Division	Lost div. semifinals 0–4 vs. Kansas City Mavericks
2024–25	72	40	24	—	5	3	88	244	212	786	4th of 8, Mountain Division	Lost div. semifinals 2–4 vs. Kansas City Mavericks

== Championships ==
Year	League	Trophy
1992–93	CHL	William “Bill” Levins Memorial Cup
