= Fort Worth Fire =

- City: Fort Worth, Texas
- League: Central Hockey League (1992–1999)
- Conference: Western Conference
- Founded: 1992
- Operated: 1992–1999
- Home arena: Fort Worth Convention Center
- Colors: Red, Black, and White
- Head coach: Pete Mahovlich (1992–1993); Steve Harrison(1993–1995); Bill McDonald (1995–97); Mike Gamble (1997); Bob Wedlake (1997); Mike Krushelnyski (1997–1999)

Championships
- Regular season titles: None
- Division titles: None
- Conference titles: 1: 1996-97
- Ray Miron President's Cup: 1: 1996-97

The Fort Worth Fire were a professional ice hockey team in the Central Hockey League. Their home games were played in the Fort Worth Convention Center Arena. They began operations in 1992 and ceased operations in 1999. The team was started by Horn Chen, the founder of the CHL, and was sold to Elmore Sports Group in 1998.

At the conclusion of the 1996–97 CHL season, the Fort Worth Fire won the league championship in seven games against the Memphis RiverKings in Fort Worth.
