= 1998–99 Wichita Thunder season =

The 1998–99 Wichita Thunder season was the seventh season of the CHL franchise in Wichita, Kansas. The Thunder's lead scorer of the previous season, Jim McGeough, and captain Jason Duda, who had led scoring in the 1998 playoffs, were both out mid-season due to injury. The Wichita Thunder finished the season third in the Western Division, with a 33–23–10 record.

== Regular season ==
=== Division standings ===
Western Division	GP	W	L	SOL	GF	GA	Pts
Oklahoma City Blazers	70	49	19	2	322	203	100
San Antonio Iguanas	70	37	26	7	286	283	81
Wichita Thunder	70	34	26	10	257	262	78
Topeka Scarecrows	70	28	38	4	189	251	60
Fort Worth Fire	70	22	43	5	245	322	49
Tulsa Oilers	70	20	41	9	261	360	49

== See also ==
- 1998–99 CHL season
