= Tim Conboy =

American ice hockey player (born 1982)

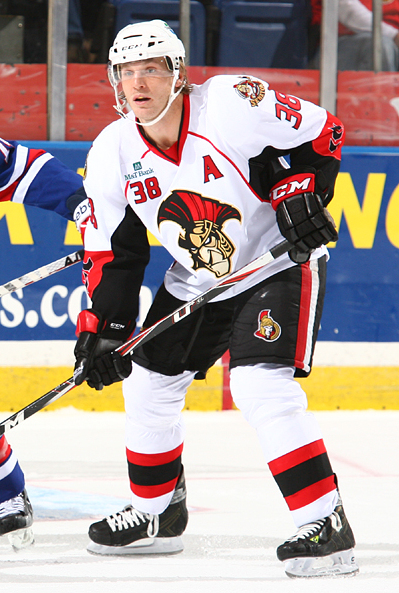
- Conboy with the Binghamton Senators in 2011
- Born: March 22, 1982 (age 44) Rosemount, Minnesota, USA
- Height: 6 ft 2 in (188 cm)
- Weight: 225 lb (102 kg; 16 st 1 lb)
- Position: Defense
- Shot: Right
- Played for: Carolina Hurricanes; ERC Ingolstadt; Düsseldorfer EG
- NHL draft: 217th overall, 2002; San Jose Sharks
- Playing career: 2004–2018

Timothy M. Conboy (born March 22, 1982) is an American former professional ice hockey player who played in the National Hockey League with the Carolina Hurricanes. He was known as an enforcer.

== Playing career ==
=== Amateur ===
Following his high school playing career with Brainerd High School, Conboy joined the Rochester Mustangs of the USHL for the 2000–01 season. In 51 games with the Mustangs, Conboy had five goals and 14 points, as well as a league high 256 penalty minutes. He returned to the Mustangs for the 2001–02 season, where in 14 games, Conboy had a goal and seven points. He then was traded to the Topeka Scarecrows.

Conboy finished the 2001–02 season with the Topeka Scarecrows, where he played in 29 games, scoring four goals and 19 points, while accumulating 128 penalty minutes. In the 2002 NHL entry draft, the San Jose Sharks drafted Conboy with the 217th overall pick.

After his junior career, Conboy played with the St. Cloud State Huskies. In his first season with the club in 2002–03, Conboy had three goals and 15 points in 31 games. In his second season with the team in 2003–04, Conboy scored five goals and 10 points in 32 games with the Huskies.

=== Professional ===
Conboy turned pro after his college season ended, and appeared with the Cleveland Barons for three games in the playoffs during the 2003–04 season. In those three games, Conboy had three assists.

With the 2004–05 NHL lockout cancelling the NHL season, the Sharks assigned Conboy to the Barons for the 2004–05 season. In 61 games with Cleveland, Conboy had four goals and 15 points, however, the Barons failed to qualify for the playoffs.

Conboy spent the 2005–06 in Cleveland, as he improved his offensive numbers to six goals and 20 points in 78 games.

After the season, Conboy became a free agent, and on July 21, 2006, he signed with the Carolina Hurricanes. The Hurricanes assigned Conboy to the Albany River Rats, the teams AHL affiliate, for the 2006–07 season. In 75 games with Albany, Conboy had three goals and 10 points, while getting 163 penalty minutes. In five playoff games, Conboy chipped in with an assist.

Conboy began the 2007–08 with the River Rats, where in 52 games, Conboy had two goals and four points, as well as a team high 191 penalty minutes. In one playoff game with Albany, Conboy had no points. Conboy also saw his first NHL action in 2007–08, as he played in his first NHL game on January 12, 2008, earning an assist and a fighting major with Scott Parker, as the Hurricanes lost to the Colorado Avalanche 5–4. Conboy appeared in 19 games with the Hurricanes, earning five assists.

He split the 2008–09 with the River Rats, as he had one goal and six points in 39 games, and the Hurricanes, as Conboy had an assist in 28 games. Conboy played in his first NHL playoff game on April 15, 2009, as he was held pointless in a 4–1 loss to the New Jersey Devils. In total, Conboy had no points in three post-season games.

Conboy once again split time between Albany and Carolina in the 2009–10 season, as he had three assists in 37 games with the River Rats, and was held pointless in 12 NHL games with the Hurricanes. Conboy returned to the River Rats for the playoffs, where he had an assist in eight games. After the season, Conboy became a free agent, and signed with the Buffalo Sabres on July 16, 2010.

The Sabres assigned Conboy to the Portland Pirates of the AHL for the 2010–11 season. In 70 games with the Pirates, Conboy recorded 12 assists and 233 penalty minutes, helping the team reach the playoffs. In 12 playoff games, Conboy scored a goal and two points. On July 11, 2011, Conboy signed a contract with the Ottawa Senators.

On July 28, 2012, Conboy signed his first European contract, with German club, ERC Ingolstadt of the DEL. After two seasons with Ingolstadt, Conboy signed with DEL rivals Düsseldorfer EG on May 2, 2014.

Following the conclusion of his fourth season in the DEL in 2017–18, having been limited to just 7 games, Conboy announced the end of his professional career due to injury on March 4, 2018.

== Career statistics ==
			Regular season					Playoffs
Season	Team	League	GP	G	A	Pts	PIM	GP	G	A	Pts	PIM
1997–98	Rosemount High School	HSMN		1	2	3		—	—	—	—	—
1998–99	Rosemount High School	HSMN		3	5	8		—	—	—	—	—
1999–2000	Brainerd High School	HSMN	22	20	26	46		—	—	—	—	—
2000–01	Rochester Mustangs	USHL	51	5	9	14	256	—	—	—	—	—
2001–02	Rochester Mustangs	USHL	14	1	6	7	65	—	—	—	—	—
2001–02	Topeka ScareCrows	USHL	29	4	15	19	128	—	—	—	—	—
2001–02	Texas Tornado	NAHL	2	0	0	0	6	—	—	—	—	—
2002–03	St. Cloud State University	WCHA	31	3	12	15	48	—	—	—	—	—
2003–04	Lone Star Cavalry	NAHL	3	0	0	0	9	—	—	—	—	—
2003–04	St. Cloud State University	WCHA	33	5	5	10	82	—	—	—	—	—
2003–04	Cleveland Barons	AHL	—	—	—	—	—	3	0	3	3	4
2004–05	Cleveland Barons	AHL	61	4	11	15	134	—	—	—	—	—
2005–06	Cleveland Barons	AHL	78	6	14	20	124	—	—	—	—	—
2006–07	Albany River Rats	AHL	75	3	7	10	163	5	0	1	1	6
2007–08	Albany River Rats	AHL	52	2	2	4	191	1	0	0	0	21
2007–08	Carolina Hurricanes	NHL	19	0	5	5	60	—	—	—	—	—
2008–09	Albany River Rats	AHL	39	1	5	6	127	—	—	—	—	—
2008–09	Carolina Hurricanes	NHL	28	0	1	1	37	3	0	0	0	9
2009–10	Carolina Hurricanes	NHL	12	0	0	0	24	—	—	—	—	—
2009–10	Albany River Rats	AHL	37	0	3	3	87	8	0	1	1	18
2010–11	Portland Pirates	AHL	70	0	12	12	233	12	1	1	2	10
2011–12	Binghamton Senators	AHL	53	2	9	11	199	—	—	—	—	—
2012–13	ERC Ingolstadt	DEL	42	1	9	10	92	4	0	0	0	12
2013–14	ERC Ingolstadt	DEL	51	8	14	22	75	20	0	6	6	51
2014–15	Düsseldorfer EG	DEL	18	4	3	7	46	—	—	—	—	—
2015–16	Düsseldorfer EG	DEL	43	0	13	13	138	5	0	0	0	6
2016–17	Düsseldorfer EG	DEL	34	2	3	5	144	—	—	—	—	—
2017–18	Düsseldorfer EG	DEL	7	0	0	0	2	—	—	—	—	—
AHL totals			465	18	63	81	1258	29	1	6	7	59
NHL totals			59	0	6	6	121	3	0	0	0	9
DEL totals			195	15	42	57	497	29	0	6	6	69
