= 2008–09 Wichita Thunder season =

2008–09 Wichita Thunder
- Division: 4th Northwest
- Conference: 8th Northern
- 2008–09 record: 20–41–3
- Home record: 11–18–3
- Road record: 9–23–0
- Goals for: 168
- Goals against: 230

Team information
- General manager: Joel Lomurno
- Coach: Brent Bilodeau
- Assistant coach: Rob Boyle
- Captain: Brad Thompson
- Arena: Britt Brown Arena
- Average attendance: 5,457

Team leaders
- Goals: Jason Duda (20)
- Assists: Jason Duda (35)
- Points: Jason Duda (55)
- Penalty minutes: Andrew Davis (135)
- Plus/minus: Jason Duda (+8)

The 2008–09 Wichita Thunder season was the 17th season of the CHL franchise in Wichita, Kansas. Rookie coach Brent Bilodeau was hired in mid-June 2008, following the worst season in franchise history. In 2008–09, the Thunder finished 20–41–3, tying the team record set the previous season for the fewest victories. The 2007–08 and 2008–2009 seasons were the two worst back-to-back seasons in Wichita Thunder history.

== Regular season ==
=== Conference standings ===
Northern Conference	GP	W	L	OTL	Pts	GF	GA
y-Colorado Eagles	64	45	15	4	94	275	195
x-Mississippi RiverKings	64	44	17	3	91	242	166
x-Oklahoma City Blazers	64	39	18	7	85	202	158
x-Bossier-Shreveport Mudbugs	64	39	19	6	84	196	169
x-Rocky Mountain Rage	64	32	26	6	70	220	219
e-Rapid City Rush	64	22	33	9	53	183	231
e-Tulsa Oilers	64	18	38	8	44	179	270
e-Wichita Thunder	64	20	41	3	43	168	230

Note: x - clinched playoff spot; y - clinched conference title; e - eliminated from playoff contention

== Awards ==
Regular Season
Player	Award	Awarded
Tim Boron	Oakley CHL Goaltender of the Week	December 22, 2008

== See also ==
- 2008–09 CHL season
