= Bob Bilodeau =

Canadian ice hockey player

- Born: August 23, 1953 (age 72) Vimy, Alberta, Canada
- Height: 5 ft 10 in (178 cm)
- Weight: 185 lb (84 kg; 13 st 3 lb)
- Position: Defence
- Played for: IHL; Des Moines Capitols; CHL; Omaha Knights; Tulsa Oilers; AHL; Hershey Bears
- NHL draft: 133rd overall, 1973; Atlanta Flames
- WHA draft: 122nd overall, 1973; Cincinnati Stingers
- Playing career: 1973–1980

Bob Bilodeau (born August 23, 1953) is a Canadian former professional ice hockey defenceman. The Atlanta Flames selected him in the 9th round (133rd overall) of the 1973 NHL Amateur Draft; the Cincinnati Stingers also selected him in the 11th round (122nd overall) of the 1973 WHA Amateur Draft.

Bilodeau played seven seasons of professional hockey, including four seasons with the Hershey Bears of the American Hockey League.

== Personal ==
His older brother Yvon Bilodeau was a 1971 draft pick of the Philadelphia Flyers. His nephew, Brent Bilodeau, played professional ice hockey for the Montreal Canadiens and Seattle Thunderbirds, he was selected 17th overall in the 1991 NHL entry draft. His grandnephew, Tyler Bilodeau plays for the UCLA Bruins.
