= Yvon Bilodeau =

Canadian ice hockey player

- Born: January 18, 1951 (age 75) Vimy, Alberta, Canada
- Height: 6 ft 3 in (191 cm)
- Weight: 210 lb (95 kg; 15 st 0 lb)
- Position: Defence
- Shot: Left
- Played for: Calgary Cowboys
- NHL draft: 78th overall, 1971; Philadelphia Flyers
- Playing career: 1971–1980

Yvon Bilodeau (born January 18, 1951) is a Canadian former professional ice hockey player. He played in four WHA games with the Calgary Cowboys during the 1975–76 season.

== Personal life ==
His younger brother Bob Bilodeau was a 1973 draft pick of the Atlanta Flames.. His son, Brent Bilodeau, played professional ice hockey for the Montreal Canadiens and Seattle Thunderbirds, he was selected 17th overall in the 1991 NHL entry draft. His grandson, Tyler Bilodeau plays for the UCLA Bruins.

== Career statistics ==
=== Regular season and playoffs ===
			Regular season					Playoffs
Season	Team	League	GP	G	A	Pts	PIM	GP	G	A	Pts	PIM
1967–68	Estevan Bruins	WCJHL	1	0	0	0	0	—	—	—	—	—
1968-69	Estevan Bruins	WCHL	34	2	3	5	29	—	—	—	—	—
1969–70	Estevan Bruins	WCHL	49	1	19	20	69	—	—	—	—	—
1970–71	Estevan Bruins	WCHL	66	7	25	32	116	—	—	—	—	—
1971–72	Richmond Robins	AHL	2	0	0	0	0	—	—	—	—	—
1971–72	Charlotte Checkers	EHL	73	5	24	29	140	15	1	7	8	19
1972–73	Dallas Black Hawks	CHL	37	2	9	11	43	7	0	2	2	8
1972–73	Richmond Robins	AHL	24	0	2	2	26	—	—	—	—	—
1973–74	Des Moines Capitols	IHL	76	16	51	67	98	10	3	7	10	4
1973–74	San Diego Gulls	WHL	1	0	0	0	0	—	—	—	—	—
1974–75	Dayton Gems	IHL	73	20	37	57	97	14	2	7	9	8
1975–76	Calgary Cowboys	WHA	4	0	0	0	2	—	—	—	—	—
1975–76	Dallas Black Hawks	CHL	16	5	5	10	10	10	1	3	4	6
1979–80	Freiburg ERC	1.GBun	12	1	3	4	8	—	—	—	—	—
WHA totals			4	0	0	0	2	—	—	—	—	—
