= 2009–10 Wichita Thunder season =

Ice hockey team season

2009–10 Wichita Thunder
- League: 15th CHL
- Conference: 7th Northern
- 2009–10 record: 9-50-5 (23 pts.)
- Home record: 3-26-3
- Road record: 6-24-2
- Goals for: 128
- Goals against: 257

Team information
- General manager: Joel Lomurno
- Coach: Jason Duda
- Assistant coach: Rob Boyle
- Captain: Chris McAllister
- Arena: Intrust Bank Arena
- Average attendance: 5,001

Team leaders
- Goals: Joel Hanson (14)
- Assists: Glenn Detulleo (19)
- Points: Joel Hanson (32)
- Penalty minutes: Chris McAllister (171)
- Plus/minus: Bobby Hughes (+5)
- Wins: Scott Campbell (7)
- Goals against average: Ian Keserich (3.71)

The 2009–10 Wichita Thunder season was the 18th season of the CHL franchise in Wichita, Kansas. After playing for 17 years in the Kansas Coliseum, the Thunder moved into its new home in the Intrust Bank Arena in Wichita, on January 23, 2010. Playing in front of a sell-out crowd of 13,412, the Thunder lost 2–1 to the Tulsa Oilers in its Intrust Bank Arena debut. Finishing the season with only 9 victories, it was one of the worst seasons in Central Hockey League history.

== Regular season ==
The Thunder relieved coach Brent Bilodeau of his duties on November 12, 2009 after a 2-7-0 start. Bilodeau was replaced by longtime Thunder veteran Jason Duda as interim head coach.

The Wichita Thunder had their very last game at their longtime home The Britt Brown Arena on January 9, 2010 where they lost to the Odessa Jackalopes 1-3.

On January 23, 2010, the Thunder lost 2-1 to the Tulsa Oilers in their inaugural game at the Intrust Bank Arena. The arena hosted a Thunder-record 13,412 fans in the team's first sellout at their new home.

=== Conference standings ===
| Northern Conference | GP | W | L | OTL | Pts | GF | GA |
|---|---|---|---|---|---|---|---|
| y-Rapid City Rush | 64 | 43 | 14 | 7 | 93 | 253 | 197 |
| x-Colorado Eagles | 64 | 42 | 15 | 7 | 91 | 277 | 208 |
| x-Bossier-Shreveport Mudbugs | 64 | 38 | 22 | 4 | 80 | 213 | 180 |
| x-Mississippi RiverKings | 64 | 33 | 24 | 7 | 73 | 217 | 116 |
| x-Missouri Mavericks | 64 | 31 | 27 | 6 | 68 | 200 | 220 |
| e-Tulsa Oilers | 64 | 28 | 29 | 7 | 63 | 203 | 230 |
| e-Wichita Thunder | 64 | 9 | 50 | 5 | 23 | 128 | 257 |

Note: GP = Games played; W = Wins; L = Losses; OTL = Overtime loss; GF = Goals for; GA = Goals against; Pts = Points;

x - clinched playoff spot; y - clinched conference title; e - eliminated from playoff contention

== Awards ==
Regular Season
| Player | Award | Awarded |
| Scott Campbell | Oakley CHL Goaltender of the Week | February 8, 2010 |
| Ian Keserich | CHL Performance of the Week | March 2, 2010 |

== Transactions ==
The Thunder were involved in the following transactions during the 2009–10 season.

Trades

| December 29, 2009 | To Mississippi RiverKings: Kevin Truelson; Tim Boron | To Wichita: Ian Keserich; Steve Makway; Kevin Cooper |
| February 10, 2010 | To Bossier-Shreveport Mudbugs: Jim Jorgensen; Rights to Jason Deleurme | To Wichita: Neil Clark |

== See also ==
- 2009–10 CHL season
