= Jason Duda =

Canadian ice hockey player and coach

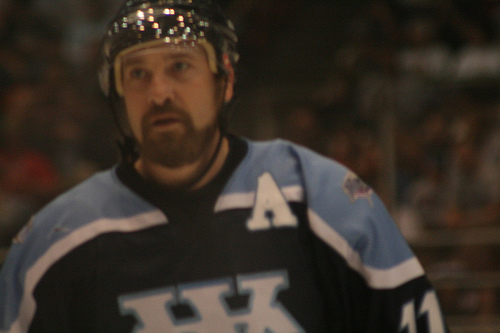
- Born: May 5, 1975 (age 51) Sexsmith, Alberta, Canada
- Height: 5 ft 10 in (178 cm)
- Weight: 185 lb (84 kg; 13 st 3 lb)
- Position: Left wing
- Shot: Left
- CHL team Former teams: Wichita Thunder; Oklahoma City Blazers
- Playing career: 1996–2010

Jason Duda (born May 5, 1975) is a Canadian retired professional ice hockey player who played for the Wichita Thunder of the Central Hockey League (CHL). He then served as assistant coach for the Wichita Thunder until being dismissed from that job on October 2, 2015.

== Early life ==
Duda was born in Sexsmith, Alberta.

== Awards ==
- Thunder Most Improved Player – 1996-97
- CHL All-Star Team – 2001, 2005, 2006
- 2005 Greater Wichita Area Sports Commission Pro Athlete of the Year
- Joe Burton Award (Scoring Champion) – 2004-05
- Rick Kozuback Award – 2010
- CHL Oakley Player of the Week: Week Ending – January 3, 2005; March 5, 2007; November 2, 2008
- His number 11 was retired by the Wichita Thunder on October 16, 2010
- Named to CHL All-Decade Second Team on December 31, 2009

== Records ==
=== Melfort Mustangs ===
- Most points in a single season (1995–96) – 141 points
  Duda while playing with the Thunder.
- Most goals scored in a single season (1995–96) – 60 goals
- Most power play goals in a single season (1995–96) – 27 power play goals
- Most assists in a single season (1995–96) – 81 assists

=== Wichita Thunder ===
- Most career games played – (730)
- Most career goals scored – (337)
- Most career assists – (553)
- Most career points – (870)
- Most hat tricks – (11)
- Most overtime goals – (7)
- Most shootout goals – (21)
- Most consecutive games from 2001-2003 – (225)

=== Central Hockey League ===
- Third in career goals – (339)
- Third in career assists – (539)
- Third in career points – (878)
- Second in career games played – (745)

== Career statistics ==
			Regular season					Playoffs
Season	Team	League	GP	G	A	Pts	PIM	GP	G	A	Pts	PIM
1991-92	Kinistino Tigers	NSJHL	42	32	33	65	-	-	-	-	-	-
1992-93	Saskatoon Blades	WHL	34	11	14	25	21	9	1	5	6	8
1993-94	Saskatoon Blades	WHL	72	5	14	19	22	16	7	7	14	10
1994-95	Saskatoon Blades	WHL	2	0	0	0	0	-	-	-	-	-
1994-95	Medicine Hat Tigers	WHL	3	1	0	1	0	-	-	-	-	-
1995-96	Melfort Mustangs	SJHL	63	60	81	141	50	14	9	14	23	22
1996-97	Oklahoma City Blazers	CHL	15	2	6	8	11	-	-	-	-	-
1996-97	Wichita Thunder	CHL	39	15	15	30	34	9	2	7	9	19
1997-98	Wichita Thunder	CHL	60	32	33	65	62	15	9	12	21	10
1998-99	Wichita Thunder	CHL	34	13	24	37	20	4	1	0	1	2
1999-00	Wichita Thunder	CHL	55	27	41	68	60	5	3	6	9	2
2000-01	Wichita Thunder	CHL	70	38	52	90	68	-	-	-	-	-
2001-02	Wichita Thunder	CHL	64	35	48	83	34	-	-	-	-	-
2002-03	Wichita Thunder	CHL	64	31	52	83	60	-	-	-	-	-
2003-04	Wichita Thunder	CHL	55	24	42	66	22	9	3	7	10	6
2004-05	Wichita Thunder	CHL	59	30	66	96	58	13	4	10	14	22
2005-06	Wichita Thunder	CHL	63	31	55	86	70	5	2	1	3	10
2006-07	Wichita Thunder	CHL	62	27	48	75	106	6	1	4	5	12
2007-08	Wichita Thunder	CHL	42	12	19	31	20	-	-	-	-	-
2008-09	Wichita Thunder	CHL	58	20	35	55	62	-	-	-	-	-
2009-10	Wichita Thunder	CHL	5	2	3	5	0	-	-	-	-	-
CHL totals			745	339	539	878	687	66	25	47	72	83

== Personal life ==
Duda resides in Wichita with his wife Deah and their two children. Duda also was a co-host for KAKE Sports Overtime Live.
