= 1910–11 Montreal Canadiens season =

NHA team season

1910–11 Montreal Canadiens
- League: 2nd NHA
- 1910–11 record: 8–8–0
- Home record: 4–4–0
- Road record: 4–4–0
- Goals for: 66
- Goals against: 62

Team information
- General manager: Jack Laviolette
- Coach: Adolphe Lecours
- Captain: Newsy Lalonde
- Arena: Montreal Arena

Team leaders
- Goals: Newsy Lalonde (19)
- Goals against average: Georges Vezina (3.9)

The 1910–11 Montreal Canadiens season was the team's second season and also the second season of the National Hockey Association (NHA). The club would improve to an 8–8 record, second in the league. It was the first season for Georges Vezina and he would lead the league in goals against average (GAA) with a record of 3.9 goals per game. Newsy Lalonde joined the team from Renfrew and led the team with 19 goals.

== Team business ==
This was the first season under new owner George Kennedy. After the 1910 NHA season, Kennedy who was an owner of the Club Athlétique-Canadien claimed the name 'Canadiens'. It was his intention that he would be granted admission to the NHA and if refused would insist that the Canadiens name be dropped. Kennedy and partner Joseph-Pierre Gadbois had previously shown interest in the Montreal Wanderers but a purchase was not completed. The Club Athletique de Canadien (CAC) joined the NHA at the NHA meeting of November 12, 1910, for $7,500. At the same meeting, both Haileybury and Cobalt teams dropped out and Quebec joined the league. The new Canadiens organization would operate the Haileybury franchise and Quebec operate Cobalt's franchise. Ambrose O'Brien owner of the Haileybury, Cobalt and Les Canadiens franchise, kept the Canadiens franchise and let it lie dormant. It is not clear why the transfer of the Canadiens from O'Brien to the CAC was done this way. Later news reports brought up the disposition of the players as an issue. The players of the Haileybury and Cobalt teams were not transferred. Both the Haileybury and Cobalt teams resumed play in the Temiscaming League. At the same time, the league was fighting with the players over a salary cap and it was not clear if the players were property of the teams or free agents.

After securing a franchise, Kennedy demanded Newsy Lalonde's return from Renfrew or the team would not operate. At first, Renfrew claimed that Lalonde was their property, but Kennedy signed Lalonde on December 12. Terms of the contract were kept secret, as the league had imposed a $5,000 salary cap and the newspapers had rumoured an offer or $2,500. Offers of $500 per season were being turned down by the players, who instead tried to form a rival league. Kennedy signed Jack Laviolette to manage the team. The club moved out of the Jubilee Rink, instead signing a lease with the Montreal Arena along with the Montreal Wanderers. The two teams effectively crowded out any rival league from playing at the Arena. The Jubilee Rink was owned by the Wanderers owners and could keep any rival league out. The players eventually capitulated to the NHA owners.

== Regular season ==
After an exhibition match by the Canadiens in Chicoutimi, Quebec, against a team with Georges Vezina in goal, Joseph Cattarinich the then-goaltender of the Canadiens was so impressed by Vezina's play that he suggested to team management that they sign Vezina and he would step aside. It was Cattarinch's final game playing with the club. He would later become part-owner of the club.

=== Final standings ===
National Hockey Association
	GP	W	L	T	GF	GA
Ottawa Hockey Club	16	13	3	0	122	69
Montreal Canadiens	16	8	8	0	66	62
Renfrew Creamery Kings	16	8	8	0	91	101
Montreal Wanderers	16	7	9	0	73	88
Quebec Bulldogs	16	4	12	0	65	97

Note: W = Wins, L = Losses, T = Ties, GF = Goals for, GA = Goals against

== Schedule and results ==
No.	Date	Visitor	Score	Home	Score	Record
1	Dec. 31	Ottawa	5	Canadiens	3	0–1
2	Jan. 7	Canadiens	4	Quebec	1	1–1
3	Jan. 14	Renfrew	1	Canadiens	4	2–1
4	Jan. 18	Canadiens	4	Wanderers	5	2–2
5	Jan. 21	Canadiens	4	Ottawa	5 (overtime)	2–3
6	Jan. 24	Quebec	5	Canadiens	9	3–3
7	Jan. 27	Canadiens	6	Renfrew	5	4–3
8	Feb. 1	Wanderers	8	Canadiens	3	4–4
9	Feb. 7	Canadiens	6	Wanderers	2	5–4
10	Feb. 11	Quebec	2	Canadiens	3	6–4
11	Feb. 15	Canadiens	4	Quebec	7	6–5
12	Feb. 21	Renfrew	2	Canadiens	4	7–5
13	Feb. 28	Wanderers	2	Canadiens	3	8–5
14	Mar. 2	Canadiens	3	Renfrew	5	8–6
15	Mar. 8	Ottawa	4	Canadiens	3	8–7
16	Mar. 10	Canadiens	0	Ottawa	5	8–8

== See also ==
- 1910–11 NHA season
