= Mukhanov =

Mukhanov (Russian: Муханов) is a Russian masculine surname, which originates from Mukhan, a short form of Muhammad, rather than from the Russian word муха (fly). its feminine counterpart is Mukhanova. It may refer to

- Alex Mukhanov (born 1976), Ukrainian ice hockey defenceman
- Viatcheslav Mukhanov (born 1956), Russian theoretical physicist and cosmologist
- Vladimir Mukhanov (born 1954), Russian football coach
