= List of Montreal Canadiens goaltenders =

The Montreal Canadiens are a National Hockey League (NHL) franchise based in Montreal, Canada. Established in 1909, the club had its first game in January 1910. The Canadiens have won 24 Stanley Cups, 23 of them since the founding of the NHL in 1917. Below is a list of Montreal Canadiens goaltenders.

== Chronological listing of Montreal Canadiens goalies ==
(Only goaltenders who played in at least one game, either regular season or during playoffs, are listed. Priority in list order each season is based on number of minutes played in the regular season and playoffs combined.)

- 2025-2026: Jakub Dobes, Sam Montembeault, Jacob Fowler
- 2024–2025: Sam Montembeault, Jakub Dobes, Cayden Primeau
- 2023–2024: Sam Montembeault, Jake Allen, Cayden Primeau, Jakub Dobes
- 2022–2023: Jake Allen, Sam Montembeault, Cayden Primeau
- 2021–2022: Jake Allen, Sam Montembeault, Cayden Primeau, Carey Price, Andrew Hammond, Michael McNiven
- 2020–2021: Carey Price, Jake Allen, Cayden Primeau
- 2019–2020: Carey Price, Charlie Lindgren, Keith Kinkaid, Cayden Primeau
- 2018–2019: Carey Price, Antti Niemi, Charlie Lindgren
- 2017–2018: Carey Price, Antti Niemi, Charlie Lindgren, Al Montoya
- 2016–2017: Carey Price, Al Montoya, Charlie Lindgren
- 2015–2016: Mike Condon, Ben Scrivens, Carey Price, Dustin Tokarski, Charlie Lindgren
- 2014–2015: Carey Price, Dustin Tokarski
- 2013–2014: Carey Price, Peter Budaj, Dustin Tokarski
- 2012–2013: Carey Price, Peter Budaj
- 2011–2012: Carey Price, Peter Budaj
- 2010–2011: Carey Price, Alex Auld
- 2009–2010: Jaroslav Halak, Carey Price
- 2008–2009: Carey Price, Jaroslav Halak, Marc Denis
- 2007–2008: Carey Price, Cristobal Huet, Jaroslav Halak
- 2006–2007: Cristobal Huet, David Aebischer, Yann Danis, Jaroslav Halak
- 2005–2006: Cristobal Huet, Jose Theodore, David Aebischer, Yann Danis
- 2004–2005: NHL lockout
- 2003–2004: Jose Theodore, Mathieu Garon
- 2002–2003: Jose Theodore, Jeff Hackett, Mathieu Garon
- 2001–2002: Jose Theodore, Jeff Hackett, Mathieu Garon, Stephane Fiset, Olivier Michaud
- 2000–2001: Jose Theodore, Jeff Hackett, Mathieu Garon, Eric Fichaud
- 1999–2000: Jeff Hackett, Jose Theodore
- 1998–1999: Jeff Hackett, Jose Theodore, Jocelyn Thibault, Frederic Chabot
- 1997–1998: Andy Moog, Jocelyn Thibault, Jose Theodore (playoffs only)
- 1996–1997: Jocelyn Thibault, Jose Theodore, Pat Jablonski, Tomas Vokoun
- 1995–1996: Jocelyn Thibault, Pat Jablonski, Patrick Roy, Patrick Labrecque, Jose Theodore
- 1994–1995: Patrick Roy, Ron Tugnutt
- 1993–1994: Patrick Roy, Andre Racicot, Ron Tugnutt, Les Kuntar, Frederic Chabot
- 1992–1993: Patrick Roy, Andre Racicot, Frederic Chabot
- 1991–1992: Patrick Roy, Roland Melanson, Andre Racicot
- 1990–1991: Patrick Roy, Andre Racicot, Jean-Claude Bergeron, Frederic Chabot
- 1989–1990: Patrick Roy, Brian Hayward, Andre Racicot
- 1988–1989: Patrick Roy, Brian Hayward, Randy Exelby
- 1987–1988: Patrick Roy, Brian Hayward, Vincent Riendeau
- 1986–1987: Patrick Roy, Brian Hayward
- 1985–1986: Patrick Roy, Doug Soetaert, Steve Penney
- 1984–1985: Steve Penney, Doug Soetaert, Patrick Roy
- 1983–1984: Rick Wamsley, Richard Sevigny, Steve Penney, Mark Holden
- 1982–1983: Rick Wamsley, Richard Sevigny, Mark Holden
- 1981–1982: Rick Wamsley, Denis Herron, Richard Sevigny, Mark Holden
- 1980–1981: Richard Sevigny, Michel Larocque, Denis Herron, Rick Wamsley
- 1979–1980: Michel Larocque, Denis Herron, Richard Sevigny
- 1978–1979: Ken Dryden, Michel Larocque
- 1977–1978: Ken Dryden, Michel Larocque
- 1976–1977: Ken Dryden, Michel Larocque
- 1975–1976: Ken Dryden, Michel Larocque
- 1974–1975: Ken Dryden, Michel Larocque
- 1973–1974: Wayne Thomas, Michel Larocque, Michel Plasse
- 1972–1973: Ken Dryden, Michel Plasse, Wayne Thomas
- 1971–1972: Ken Dryden, Phil Myre, Denis DeJordy, Rogatien Vachon
- 1970–1971: Rogatien Vachon, Phil Myre, Ken Dryden
- 1969–1970: Rogatien Vachon, Phil Myre, Lorne Worsley
- 1968–1969: Rogatien Vachon, Lorne Worsley, Tony Esposito, Ernie Wakely
- 1967–1968: Lorne Worsley, Rogatien Vachon
- 1966–1967: Charlie Hodge, Rogatien Vachon, Lorne Worsley, Garry Bauman
- 1965–1966: Lorne Worsley, Charlie Hodge
- 1964–1965: Charlie Hodge, Lorne Worsley
- 1963–1964: Charlie Hodge, Lorne Worsley, Jean-Guy Morissette
- 1962–1963: Jacques Plante, Cesare Maniago, Ernie Wakely
- 1961–1962: Jacques Plante
- 1960–1961: Jacques Plante, Charlie Hodge
- 1959–1960: Jacques Plante, Charlie Hodge
- 1958–1959: Jacques Plante, Charlie Hodge, Claude Pronovost, Claude Cyr
- 1957–1958: Jacques Plante, Charlie Hodge, Len Broderick, John Aiken
- 1956–1957: Jacques Plante, Gerry McNeil
- 1955–1956: Jacques Plante, Bob Perreault
- 1954–1955: Jacques Plante, Charlie Hodge, Claude Evans, Andre Binette
- 1953–1954: Gerry McNeil, Jacques Plante
- 1952–1953: Gerry McNeil, Jacques Plante, Hal Murphy
- 1951–1952: Gerry McNeil
- 1950–1951: Gerry McNeil
- 1949–1950: Bill Durnan, Gerry McNeil
- 1948–1949: Bill Durnan
- 1947–1948: Bill Durnan, Gerry McNeil
- 1946–1947: Bill Durnan
- 1945–1946: Bill Durnan, Paul Bibeault
- 1944–1945: Bill Durnan
- 1943–1944: Bill Durnan
- 1942–1943: Paul Bibeault
- 1941–1942: Paul Bibeault, Bert Gardiner
- 1940–1941: Bert Gardiner, Paul Bibeault, Wilf Cude
- 1939–1940: Claude Bourque, Wilf Cude, Mike Karakas, Charlie Sands
- 1938–1939: Claude Bourque, Wilf Cude
- 1937–1938: Wilf Cude, Paul Gauthier
- 1936–1937: Wilf Cude, George Hainsworth
- 1935–1936: Wilf Cude, Abbie Cox
- 1934–1935: Wilf Cude
- 1933–1934: Lorne Chabot, Wilf Cude
- 1932–1933: George Hainsworth
- 1931–1932: George Hainsworth, Albert Leduc (Canadiens defenceman, replaced Hainsworth in net on one occasion while Hainsworth served a two-minute penalty)
- 1930–1931: George Hainsworth
- 1929–1930: George Hainsworth, Roy Worters, Mickey Murray
- 1928–1929: George Hainsworth
- 1927–1928: George Hainsworth
- 1926–1927: George Hainsworth
- 1925–1926: Herb Rheaume, Alphonse Lacroix, Bill Taugher, Georges Vezina
- 1924–1925: Georges Vezina
- 1923–1924: Georges Vezina
- 1922–1923: Georges Vezina
- 1921–1922: Georges Vezina, Sprague Cleghorn (Canadiens defenceman, replaced Vezina in net on one occasion while Vezina served a two-minute penalty)
- 1920–1921: Georges Vezina
- 1919–1920: Georges Vezina
- 1918–1919: Georges Vezina
- 1917–1918: Georges Vezina
- 1916–1917: Georges Vezina
- 1915–1916: Georges Vezina
- 1914–1915: Georges Vezina
- 1913–1914: Georges Vezina
- 1912–1913: Georges Vezina
- 1911–1912: Georges Vezina
- 1910–1911: Georges Vezina
- 1910: Joseph Cattarinich, Teddy Groulx
