= Adolphe Lecours =

Canadian sports executive (1878–1955)

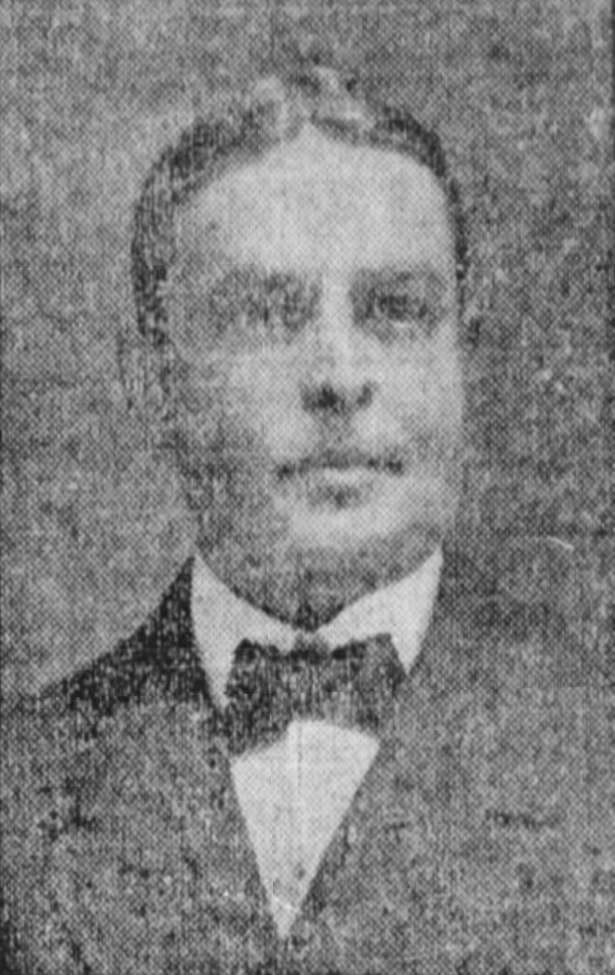
Lecours circa 1910

Adolphe Lecours (January 23, 1878 – July 6, 1955) was a Canadian sports executive.

== Biography ==
Lecours was the president of the L'Association athletique d'amateurs le National in 1910 when the Club Athletique-Canadien, owned by George Kennedy purchased the Montreal Canadiens professional ice hockey team. Lecours became the second head coach of the Montreal Canadiens. He coached the team for only the one season 1910–11. His record that one year was 8-8-0. He demanded a raise in pay and was replaced by Napoléon Dorval.

Preceded by Jack Laviolette	Head coach of the Montreal Canadiens; 1910–1911	Succeeded by Napoléon Dorval
