= 1999–2000 Wichita Thunder season =

The 1999–2000 Wichita Thunder season was the eighth season of the CHL franchise in Wichita, Kansas. It was Bryan Wells fourth season as coach. The Thunder had an average of 4,639 fans at 35 games during the season.

== Regular season ==
=== Division standings ===
Western Division	GP	W	L	T	GF	GA	Pts
Oklahoma City Blazers	70	39	24	7	248	220	85
Indianapolis Ice	70	39	28	3	290	244	81
Tulsa Oilers	70	38	27	5	251	244	81
Wichita Thunder	70	37	26	7	245	231	81
Topeka Scarecrows	70	35	27	8	245	243	78
San Antonio Iguanas	70	33	32	5	229	263	71

== See also ==
- 1999–00 CHL season
