= Napoléon Dorval =

Canadian ice hockey coach

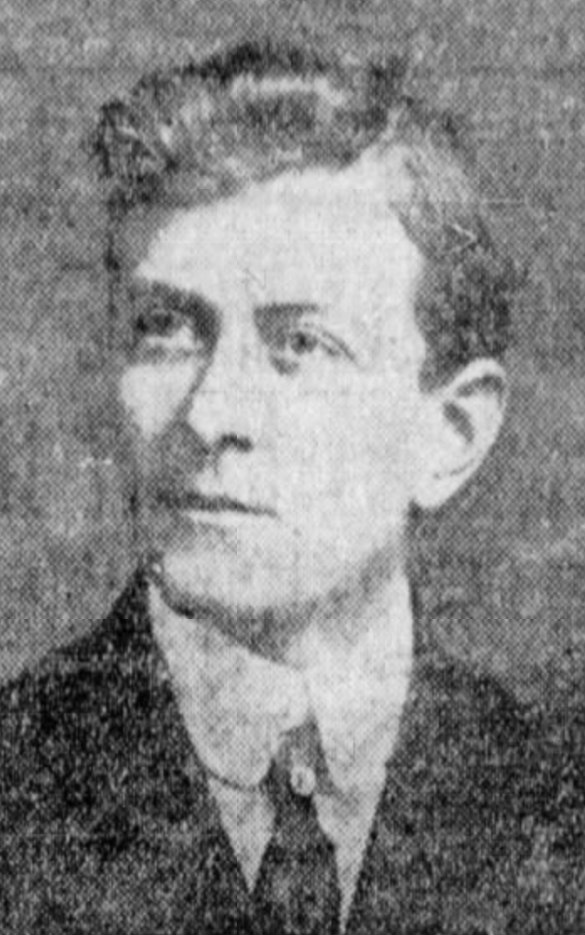
Dorval circa 1909

Joseph Alexandre Napoleon Dorval (May 16, 1878 – June 29, 1955) was the third head coach of the Montreal Canadiens ice hockey team, following Adolphe Lecours. He coached the team for the 1911–12 season and the 1912–13 season. His record for those two seasons was 17-21-0.

| Preceded by Adolphe Lecours | Head coach of the Montreal Canadiens; 1910–1911 | Succeeded by Jimmy Gardner |
