= 2005–06 Wichita Thunder season =

2005–06 Wichita Thunder

Team information
- General manager: Chris Presson
- Coach: Mark French
- Captain: Jason Duda
- Alternate captains: Travis Clayton; Daniel Tetrault
- Arena: Britt Brown Arena

The 2005–06 Wichita Thunder season was the 14th season of the CHL franchise in Wichita, Kansas.

== Regular season ==
=== Division standings ===
Northwest Division	GP	W	L	OTL	SOL	GF	GA	Pts
Colorado Eagles	64	44	14	0	6	241	183	94
Wichita Thunder	64	38	18	4	4	233	200	84
Oklahoma City Blazers	64	35	24	3	2	233	215	75
Tulsa Oilers	64	29	28	4	3	209	227	65

== Awards ==
Regular Season
Player	Award	Awarded
Joe Blaznek	All-Star Game (Starter)	December 30, 2005
Travis Clayton	All-Star Game	January 3, 2006
Jason Duda	All-Star Game	January 3, 2006

== See also ==
- 2005–06 CHL season
