= 2006–07 Wichita Thunder season =

2006–07 Wichita Thunder
- Division: 3rd Northwest
- Conference: Northern
- 2006–07 record: 28-28-8
- Home record: 18-9-5
- Road record: 10-19-3
- Goals for: 191
- Goals against: 213

Team information
- General manager: Chris Presson
- Coach: Mark French
- Assistant coach: Ben Murphy
- Captain: Jason Duda
- Arena: Britt Brown Arena
- Average attendance: 6239

Team leaders
- Goals: Travis Clayton (30)
- Assists: Jason Duda (48)
- Points: Jason Duda (75)
- Penalty minutes: Steve Dix (283)
- Plus/minus: Travis Clayton (+7)
- Wins: Sebastien Laplante (15)
- Goals against average: Sebastien Laplante (2.65)

The 2006–07 Wichita Thunder season was the 15th season of the CHL franchise in Wichita, Kansas. The Thunder lost five of their last eight games, but managed to secure the final spot in the playoffs during the last game of the season. After a strong start, the Wichita Thunder lost the first playoff series 4–1 to the Bossier-Shreveport Mudbugs.

== Regular season ==
=== Division standings ===
Northwest Division	GP	W	L	OTL	SOL	GF	GA	Pts
Colorado Eagles	64	46	17	0	1	256	182	93
Oklahoma City Blazers	64	35	21	2	6	211	214	78
Wichita Thunder	64	28	28	0	8	191	213	64
Rocky Mountain Rage	64	17	40	4	3	180	251	41

== See also ==
- 2006–07 CHL season
