= 2003–04 Wichita Thunder season =

The 2003–04 Wichita Thunder season was the 12th season of the CHL franchise in Wichita, Kansas. The Thunder appeared in the playoffs for the first time since the 1999–2000 season. Team captain Mark Kolesar played in all 64 games of the season, but missed the latter part of the playoffs due to injury.

== Regular season ==
=== Division standings ===
| Northwest Division | GP | W | L | OTL | SOL | GF | GA | Pts |
|---|---|---|---|---|---|---|---|---|
| Colorado Eagles | 64 | 43 | 16 | 0 | 5 | 232 | 156 | 91 |
| Wichita Thunder | 64 | 35 | 24 | 1 | 4 | 194 | 197 | 75 |
| New Mexico Scorpions | 64 | 32 | 27 | 2 | 3 | 200 | 208 | 69 |
| Tulsa Oilers | 64 | 26 | 25 | 4 | 9 | 194 | 210 | 65 |
| Oklahoma City Blazers | 64 | 29 | 28 | 2 | 5 | 176 | 194 | 65 |

== See also ==
- 2003–04 CHL season
