= Brett Seguin =

Canadian ice hockey player

- Born: February 20, 1972 (age 54) St. Marys, Ontario, Canada
- Height: 5 ft 9 in (175 cm)
- Weight: 190 lb (86 kg; 13 st 8 lb)
- Position: Centre
- Shot: Left
- Played for: IHL; Phoenix Roadrunners; Fort Wayne Komets; Detroit Vipers; CoHL; Muskegon Fury; WPHL; Austin Ice Bats; CHL; Topeka Scarecrows
- NHL draft: 130th overall, 1991; Los Angeles Kings
- Playing career: 1992–2004

Brett Seguin (born February 20, 1972) is a Canadian former professional ice hockey player. He was selected by the Los Angeles Kings in the 6th round (130th overall) of the 1991 NHL entry draft. He is the son of former National Hockey League winger Dan Seguin.

Seguin played major junior hockey in the Ontario Hockey League (OHL) with the Ottawa 67's, where he finished second in league scoring during the 1991–92 OHL season, and scored a career total of 303 assists to surpass Wayne Groulx as the OHL's all-time assist leader.

Seguin turned professional with the 1992–93 season. He played 12 seasons of minor pro hockey, including the 1998–99 season spent in the Central Hockey League (CHL) with the expansion team Topeka ScareCrows where he quickly became a fan favourite playing in the 1999 CHL All-Star game, and also recorded the team's first hat trick on March 18, 1999 against the Wichita Thunder in a 4-0 win.

Seguin hung up his skates following the 2003–04 season spent in the Central Hockey League with the Austin Ice Bats. In his career, he was one of the few elite players to be inducted into the 1,000-point club.
