= 2002–03 Wichita Thunder season =

The 2002–03 Wichita Thunder season was the 11th season of the CHL franchise in Wichita, Kansas. It was Derek Laxdal's first season as coach. The Thunder had a promising start to the season, fell apart mid-way through, and improved to 8–7 in its final 15 games. Nevertheless, the team finished 21–26–7, recording its fewest wins in the history of the club.

In March 2003, Tom Gomes was honored as the Central Hockey League player of the month.

== Regular season ==
=== Division standings ===
Northwest Division	GP	W	L	OTL	SOL	GF	GA	Pts
Oklahoma City Blazers	64	37	20	1	6	225	196	81
Amarillo Gorillas	64	39	23	2	0	205	176	80
Tulsa Oilers	64	37	22	3	2	218	195	79
Wichita Thunder	64	21	36	5	2	216	261	49

== See also ==
- 2002–03 CHL season
