= Alex Mukhanov =

Ukrainian ice hockey player

- Born: May 17, 1976 (age 50) Kiev, Ukraine
- Height: 6 ft 1 in (185 cm)
- Weight: 209 lb (95 kg; 14 st 13 lb)
- Position: Defence
- Shot: Left
- Played for: Sokil Kyiv; Tacoma Sabercats; Topeka Scarecrows; Fort Wayne Komets; EV Füssen
- NHL draft: Undrafted
- Playing career: 1994–2012

Alex Mukhanov (born May 17, 1976) is a Ukrainian former professional ice hockey defenceman.

Mukhanov played eight seasons (2004–2012) in the Ukrainian Professional Hockey League with six different teams. He represented Ukraine in Pool B of the 1994 World Junior Ice Hockey Championships and in Pool A of the 1995 World Junior Ice Hockey Championships and 1996 World Junior Ice Hockey Championships.
