= Brent Bilodeau =

American ice hockey player (born 1973)

- Born: March 27, 1973 (age 53) Dallas, Texas, U.S.
- Height: 6 ft 4 in (193 cm)
- Weight: 230 lb (104 kg; 16 st 6 lb)
- Position: Defense
- Shot: Right
- Played for: AHL; Fredericton Canadiens; Hershey Bears; Saint John Flames; ECHL; Johnstown Chiefs; IHL; Kansas City Blades; Las Vegas Thunder; San Antonio Dragons; San Francisco Spiders; WCHL; Tacoma Sabercats
- NHL draft: 17th overall, 1991; Montreal Canadiens
- Playing career: 1993–2005

Brent Bilodeau (born March 23, 1973) is an American former professional ice hockey defenseman. He was drafted in the first round (17th overall) of the 1991 NHL entry draft by the Montreal Canadiens while a member of the Seattle Thunderbirds of the Western Hockey League.

== Professional career ==
=== Player ===
A primarily defensive defenseman, his game was thought to suit Montreal's style of play of the time, but he never played a single game for the Canadiens or any other NHL team. He is the only first round draftee of the 1991 draft not to have played any games in the NHL. He played in minor-pro hockey leagues until he retired as a member of the Johnstown Chiefs of the ECHL after the 2004–05 season.

=== Coaching ===
Shortly after his retirement, Bilodeau entered coaching. He started his coaching his career as an assistant with the ECHL's Las Vegas Wranglers for three years before becoming the head coach of the Wichita Thunder of the Central Hockey League in 2008. He was also an assistant coach for the Tri-City Americans, from 2009 to 2012.

== Personal ==
Bilodeau was born in Dallas, Texas while his father Yvon was a member of the CHL's Dallas Black Hawks. He learned how to skate at age two and started playing hockey at age five. His father Yvon was a former Philadelphia Flyers draft pick, selected in the 6th round (78th overall) in the 1971 NHL entry draft and his uncle Bob was a former Atlanta Flames draft pick, selected in the ninth round (133rd overall) in the 1973 NHL entry draft.

He is married to retired American WNBA player Cass Bauer-Bilodeau. His son, Tyler Bilodeau, plays for the Long Island Nets.

== Career statistics ==
=== Regular season and playoffs ===
| | | | Regular season | | | | | Playoffs |
| Season | Team | League | GP | G | A | Pts | PIM | GP | G | A | Pts | PIM |
|---|---|---|---|---|---|---|---|---|---|---|---|---|
| 1988–89 | St. Albert Saints | AJHL | 55 | 8 | 17 | 25 | 167 | — | — | — | — | — |
| 1989–90 | Seattle Thunderbirds | WHL | 68 | 14 | 29 | 43 | 170 | 13 | 3 | 5 | 8 | 31 |
| 1990–91 | Seattle Thunderbirds | WHL | 55 | 7 | 18 | 25 | 145 | 6 | 1 | 0 | 1 | 12 |
| 1991–92 | Seattle Thunderbirds | WHL | 7 | 1 | 2 | 3 | 43 | — | — | — | — | — |
| 1991–92 | Swift Current Broncos | WHL | 56 | 10 | 47 | 57 | 118 | 8 | 2 | 3 | 5 | 11 |
| 1992–93 | Swift Current Broncos | WHL | 59 | 11 | 57 | 68 | 77 | 17 | 5 | 14 | 19 | 18 |
| 1993–94 | Fredericton Canadiens | AHL | 72 | 2 | 5 | 7 | 89 | — | — | — | — | — |
| 1994–95 | Fredericton Canadiens | AHL | 50 | 4 | 8 | 12 | 146 | 12 | 3 | 3 | 6 | 28 |
| 1995–96 | San Francisco Spiders | IHL | 65 | 3 | 4 | 7 | 123 | 4 | 1 | 0 | 1 | 2 |
| 1996–97 | Saint John Flames | AHL | 24 | 2 | 1 | 3 | 39 | — | — | — | — | — |
| 1996–97 | San Antonio Dragons | IHL | 48 | 4 | 7 | 11 | 178 | — | — | — | — | — |
| 1996–97 | Las Vegas Thunder | IHL | 3 | 0 | 0 | 0 | 0 | — | — | — | — | — |
| 1997–98 | Tacoma Sabercats | WCHL | 2 | 0 | 1 | 1 | 2 | — | — | — | — | — |
| 1997–98 | Las Vegas Thunder | IHL | 15 | 0 | 1 | 1 | 39 | — | — | — | — | — |
| 1997–98 | Kansas City Blades | IHL | 48 | 3 | 12 | 15 | 148 | 5 | 0 | 0 | 0 | 4 |
| 1998–99 | Kansas City Blades | IHL | 35 | 0 | 4 | 4 | 66 | — | — | — | — | — |
| 1999–2000 | Johnstown Chiefs | ECHL | 70 | 8 | 26 | 34 | 94 | 7 | 0 | 4 | 4 | 8 |
| 2000–01 | Johnstown Chiefs | ECHL | 64 | 7 | 22 | 29 | 123 | 4 | 1 | 1 | 2 | 7 |
| 2000–01 | Hershey Bears | AHL | 3 | 0 | 0 | 0 | 0 | — | — | — | — | — |
| 2001–02 | Johnstown Chiefs | ECHL | 72 | 3 | 30 | 33 | 95 | 8 | 0 | 2 | 2 | 19 |
| 2002–03 | Johnstown Chiefs | ECHL | 71 | 10 | 17 | 27 | 62 | — | — | — | — | — |
| 2003–04 | Johnstown Chiefs | ECHL | 70 | 7 | 23 | 30 | 81 | 1 | 0 | 0 | 0 | 2 |
| 2004–05 | Johnstown Chiefs | ECHL | 67 | 2 | 13 | 15 | 87 | — | — | — | — | — |
| AHL totals | | | 139 | 8 | 14 | 22 | 274 | 12 | 3 | 3 | 6 | 28 |
| IHL totals | | | 214 | 10 | 36 | 46 | 520 | 9 | 1 | 0 | 1 | 6 |
| ECHL totals | | | 414 | 37 | 131 | 168 | 542 | 20 | 1 | 7 | 8 | 36 |

=== International ===
| Year | Team | Event | GP | G | A | Pts | PIM |
|---|---|---|---|---|---|---|---|
| 1992 | USA | WJC | 7 | 0 | 1 | 1 | 12 |
| 1993 | USA | WJC | 7 | 0 | 1 | 1 | 6 |
| Junior totals | | | 14 | 0 | 2 | 2 | 18 |

== Coaching statistics ==
| Team | Year | Regular Season | | | | | | Post Season | | | |
| Team | Year | G | W | L | T | Pts | Finish | W | L | Win % | Result |
|---|---|---|---|---|---|---|---|---|---|---|---|
| Wichita Thunder | 2008–09 | 64 | 20 | 41 | 3 | 43 | 4th in Northwest | – | – | – | Missed playoffs |
| Wichita Thunder | 2009–10 | 9 | 2 | 7 | 0 | (23) | Replaced Midseason | | | | |
| Total | | 73 | 22 | 48 | 3 | .321 | | 0 | 0 | .000 | |

== Awards ==
- WHL East Second All-Star Team – 1992 & 1993

| Preceded by Turner Stevenson | Montreal Canadiens first-round draft pick 1991 | Succeeded by David Wilkie |
