= Topeka ScareCrows =

Topeka Scarecrows
- City: Topeka, Kansas
- League: Central Hockey League
- Operated: 1998–2001
- Home arena: Landon Arena
- Colors: Black, Red, Yellow

The Topeka Scarecrows were a professional ice hockey team located in Topeka, Kansas, playing their home games at Landon Arena. The team was a member of the Central Hockey League from their founding in 1998 until 2001 when there franchise was terminated by the league midseason.

After the professional team disband, the ownership group would then start a new junior hockey team with the same name in the Tier I Junior A United States Hockey League playing from 2001 to 2003. The team was sold and then moved to St. Louis, Missouri and became the St. Louis Heartland Eagles.

== Facts ==
Founded: 1998–1999 season
Arena: Landon Arena (capacity 7,777)
Uniform colors: black, red, and yellow
Local Media: Topeka Capital-Journal

== History/Milestones ==
- November 13, 1997: CHL commits itself to the goal of having a franchise in Topeka for the 1998–1999 season. Co-founders Arnold Diamond and Ed Levy begin team development beginning in 1996 and making way for team and league expansion.
- February 23, 1998: Shawnee County commissioners sign a contract with Flying Cross Check, L.C.C., the company that will own and operate the CHL expansion team. The five-year pact has options for two three-year extensions.
- April 30, 1998: The Topeka ScareCrows unveil their nickname and logo.
- June 10, 1998: Construction begins on the ice installation at Landon Arena (seating capacity 7,779).
- July 20, 1998: Installation of Landon Arena ice equipment is finished.
- August 6, 1998: The Topeka ScareCrows pick their first 10 players in the Central Hockey League expansion draft, then execute the franchise's first trade to secure the rights to left wing Doug Lawrence, a six-year veteran who, should he sign, would come to Topeka from the Tulsa Oilers.
- September 1, 1998: Haywire, the mascot for the Topeka Scarecrows is born.
- October 16, 1998: The CHL Topeka Scarecrows play their first game ever in a sold out Landon Arena (capacity 7,777), a 7–3 loss to the Wichita Thunder.
- November 6, 1998: The CHL Topeka Scarecrows win their first game, a 4–3 triumph over the San Antonio Iguanas at Landon Arena.
- November 20, 1998: The CHL Topeka Scarecrows earn their first shootout win, 4–3, in a game against the Wichita Thunder in the Kansas Coliseum (seating capacity 9,600).
- December 20, 1998: The CHL Topeka Scarecrows beat the San Antonio Iguanas 5–4 to end an eight-game losing streak.
- January 19, 1999: Brett Seguin is the first Topeka Scarecrow to play in CHL All-Star game.
- February 3, 1999: Rod Branch records the first shutout in CHL Topeka Scarecrows history.
- March 18, 1999: Brett Seguin records the first hat trick in CHL Topeka Scarecrows history, against the Wichita Thunder in a 4–0 win.
- April 10, 1999: The Topeka ScareCrows end their season after losing in the first round of their first-ever Central Hockey League playoff appearance after three one-sided games against the Oklahoma City Blazers. Before going three-and-out in the playoffs, the ScareCrows finished the last half of the season with a winning record. Topeka was 18–16–1 from January through the end of the regular season after posting a 10–22–3 mark from October through December. They finished with a 28–38–4 record and averaged 4,793 fans a game.
- October 15, 1999: The Topeka ScareCrows begin their second season in a 3–1 loss against the San Antonio Iguanas, in front of a Landon Arena crowd of 7,156.
- January 25, 2000: Brett Seguin, John Vary and Bill Monkman are selected to play in the CHL all-star game.
- April 2, 2000: The Topeka ScareCrows' second Central Hockey League season ends with a 35–27–8 record, with eight shootout losses, just three points short of making the playoffs. They finished third in attendance, averaging 4,991 fans a game.
- May 3, 2000: Topeka ScareCrows general manager Chris Presson accepts position as general manager of the United Hockey League expansion club in New Haven (the New Haven Hurricanes). He is replaced by ScareCrows former assistant general manager Doug Miller.
- October 13, 2000: The CHL Topeka Scarecrows begin their third and final season at home against the Wichita Thunder 3–2 in a shootout at Landon Arena in front of 4,789 fans.
- February 20, 2001: The CHL's board of governors decides to terminate the Topeka Scarecrows season with 21 games remaining—10 of which were scheduled for Landon Arena. Saying that the ScareCrows and the Border City Bandits, of Texarkana, Texas, "breached multiple financial obligations under their sanction agreements with the CHL," the Indianapolis-based league terminated the participation of both franchises for the remainder of the 2001 season.
- February 22, 2001: The Topeka ScareCrows returned to the ice in Tulsa, Oklahoma, ending a 13-day layoff that included three days in limbo following their suspension Tuesday from the Central Hockey League, with the help of a temporary restraining order issued in Shawnee County District Court on February 16, 2001, that blocked the league from ending the ScareCrows' season.
- March 8, 2001: U.S. District Judge Sam Crow filed an 18-page ruling in which he denies the Central Hockey League's request to lift a temporary restraining order keeping the ScareCrows on the ice.
- March 29, 2001: The ScareCrows' end their third and final home season at Landon Arena with a 4–1 loss to the Wichita Thunder.
- April 10, 2001: The CHL ScareCrows end the franchise's three-year history as a minor-league professional program by ending their best-of-five Central Hockey League playoff series in a 5–3 loss to San Antonio in front of 2,121 fans. The Iguanas' victory, which the visitors claimed with a three-goal third period that wiped out a 3–2 deficit, gave San Antonio a 3–1 series victory and advanced the Texans to the Western Conference finals against Oklahoma City.

== Season-by-season records ==
Note: GP = Games played, W = Wins, L = Losses, OTL = Overtime Losses, Pts = Points, GF = Goals for, GA = Goals against, PIM = Penalties in minutes

Season	GP	W	L	OTL	Pts	GF	GA	PIM	Finish	Playoffs
1998–99	70	28	38	4	60	189	251	1584	4th, Western	Lost in Round 1
1999–00	70	35	27	8	78	245	243	1533	5th, Western	Out of Playoffs
2000–01	69	38	23	8	84	256	245	1533	3rd, Western	Lost in Round 1

== All-Time Roster ==
#	Player name	Pos	Seasons	Yrs	Games Played	Birthplace	Birthdate
2	Alex Motley	C	1998–1999	1	19	Pleasanton, CA	Oct 1, 1974
2	Alex Mukhanov	D	1999–2000	1	24	Moscow, Russia	May 17, 1976
	Andre Quesnel	R	1999–2000	1	3	Ottawa, ONT	January 26, 1977
	Andy Adams	G	1998–1999	1	9	Thornhill, ONT	Oct 2, 1976
6	Anthony Zurfluh	D	2000–2001	1	13	Soldotna, AK	January 24, 1977
10	Bill Monkman	R	1999–2000	1	65	Tara, ONT	May 16, 1975
16	Blair Manning	C	1999–2001	2	131	Vancouver, BC	May 27, 1975
	Blake Sheane	R	2000–2001	1	11	Virden, MAN	May 5, 1977
44	Bob Berg	L	2000–2001	1	69	Beamsville, ONT	Feb 7, 1970
	Bob Pardy	D	1998–1999	1	8	St. John\'s, NF	July 28, 1974
	Brad Klyn	D	1998–1999	1	3	Surrey, BC	
40	Brett Seguin	C	1998–2000	2	140	St. Mary\'s, ONT	February 20, 1972
44	Chad Antonishyn	D	1998–1999	1	47	Regina, SASK	May 25, 1974
	Chris Belanger	D	1998–1999	1	10	Welland, ONT	April 4, 1972
33	Chris Bowen	L	1998–1999	1	47	Barrie, ONT	Jul 3, 1976
9	Chris Burke	L	2000–2001	1	4	Winona, MN	Aug 9, 1976
23	Chris Felix	D	2000–2001	1	68	Bramalea, ONT	May 27, 1964
	Chris King	G	1998–1999	1	1	Braintree, MA	Feb 7, 1974
21	Chris Maillet	D	2000–2001	1	46	Moncton, NB	January 28, 1976
29	Dale Lafrance	R	1999–2000	1	13	Sudbury, ONT	
	Dave Gregory	D	1998–1999	1	23	Woodstock, ONT	Jan 5, 1967
22	David "Duke" Bouskill	L	1999–2001	2	121	Glen Williams, ONT	Sep 11, 1976
6	Gary Coupal	R	1999–2000	1	20	Sudbury, ONT	September 16, 1974
12 & 14	Grady Manson	C	1999–2000	1	23	Brandon, MAN	May 26, 1975
29	Jan Melichar	D	1998–2000	2	44	Trebic, Czech	February 24, 1978
32	Jason Girodat	F	1999–2000	1	3	Shaunavon, SASK	
14	Jason Lafreniere	C	1999–2000	1	3	St. Catharines, ONT	Jun 12, 1966
27	Jay Hern	L	2000–2001	1	58	Medicine Hat, ALTA	Jun 12, 1976
11	Jeff Goldie	L	2000–2001	1	58	Owen Sound, ONT	May 27, 1974
27	Joe Coombs	L	1998–2000	2	106	Brantford, ONT	Jan 6, 1975
16	Joey Beaudry	R	1998–2000	2	59	Prince Albert, SASK	Aug 6, 1976
32	John Gibson	D	1999–2000	1	9	Kingston, ONT	September 30, 1970
17	John McCabe	W	2000–2001	1	67	Sudbury, ONT	May 30, 1974
4	John Vary	D	1999–2001	2	138	Owen Sound, ONT	Nov 2, 1972
19	Jordan Shields	L	1998–1999	1	44	Gloucester, ONT	April 27, 1972
	Ken Eddy	D	1998–1999	1	3	Rochester, MN	Aug 4, 1969
	Kevin Fricke	D	1999–2000	1	25	Edina, MN	April 18, 1974
	Kevin Lune	D	1998–1999	1	21	Brantford, ONT	Aug 6, 1971
19	Kirk LLano	D	1999–2000	1	67	Calgary, ALTA	Oct 1, 1973
7	Kyle Haviland	D	1998–2000	2	78	Windsor, ONT	Oct 8, 1971
	Lannie McCabe	D	2000–2001	1	64	Sudbury, ONT	July 13, 1977
33	Luciano Caravaggio	G	2000–2001	1	40	Toronto, ONT	Mar 10, 1975
	Marco Emond	G	1998–1999	1	5	Valleyfield, PQ	November 20, 1977
	Marcus Nilsson	R	1998–1999	1	3		
10	Mark Edmundson	C	2000–2001	1	65	London, ONT	Nov 3, 1975
39	Michal Podolka	G	1998–2000	2	39	Most, Czech Rep.	Nov 8, 1977
33	Mike Degurse	L	1999–2000	1	9	Amajinnang, ONT	Apr 10, 1974
44	Mike Hiebert	D	1999–2000	1	18	Winnipeg, MAN	April 16, 1975
	Mike Migen	D	1998–1999	1	2		
28	Mike Rusk	D	1998–2000	2	129	Milton, ONT	April 26, 1975
	Mike Tilson‡	D	1998–1999	1		Pickering, ONT	June 28, 1978
9	Oleg Tsirkounov	F	1998–2000	2	92	Kiev, Ukraine	March 15, 1977
	Paul Godfrey	R	1998–1999	1	10	Sault Ste. Marie, ONT	October 30, 1976
61	Paul Strand	L	2000–2001	1	64	Sudbury, ONT	Jan 12, 1971
20	Peter Brearley	R	2000–2001	1	66	Chatham, ONT	June 27, 1975
14	Randy Best	D	1999–2000	1	15	Woodsbury, MN	May 3, 1974
23	Rod Branch	G	1998–2000	2	93	Fort St. John, BC	April 14, 1975
4	Roy Gray	D	1998–1999	1	3	Toronto, ONT	April 22, 1976
7	Ryan Hartung	D	2000–2001	1	56	St. Paul, MN	May 26, 1977
21	Ryan McCormack	R	2000–2001	1	10	Thunder Bay, ONT	Apr 3, 1978
	Ryan Phillips	L	1998–1999	1	49	North Vancouver, BC	Aug 7, 1975
33	Scot Bell	R	1999–2000	1	26	Ottawa, ONT	April 18, 1972
	Scott Dickson	C	1998–1999	1	30	Brandon, MAN	May 12, 1976
31	Scott Hay	G	2000–2001	1	31	Scarborough, ONT	Mar 4, 1975
11 & 63	Sergei Deschevy	D	1999–2001	2	111	Kiev, Ukraine	June 25, 1977
47	Sergei Olympiev	L	1998–2000	2	53	Lipetski, Russia	Dec 1, 1975
12	Shawn Gervais	R	2000–2001	1	67	St. Albert, ALTA	Dec 7, 1976
26	Shawn Randall	R	1998–1999	1	47	Montrose, MI	November 13, 1972
77	Stephane Desjardins	D	1998–1999	1	60	Anjou, PQ	June 23, 1972
	Steve Adams	D	1998–1999	1	3	Edmonton, ALTA	Nov 4, 1975
	Steve Moore	C	1999–2000	1	67	Gardiner, ME	June 21, 1971
	Sylvain Thibeault	D	1999–2000	1	8	St. Jerome, PQ	October 30, 1970
24	Tom Gomes	R	1999–2000	1	29	Harrow, ONT	April 29, 1972
	Tom Stewart	R	1998–1999	1	26	Brantford, ONT	May 19, 1975
	Travis Riggin	F	1998–1999	1	32	Kincardine, ONT	April 26, 1977
	Travis Sinden	G	1998–1999	1	1	Phoenix, AZ	March 31, 1976
21	Trevor Hanas	R	1998–2000	2	99	Regina, SASK	January 20, 1975
10	Troy Frederick	L	1998–1999	1	64	Virden, MAN	April 4, 1969
9	Virgil Rutili	D	1998–1999	1	2	Addison, IL	February 17, 1973
17	Yuri Moscevsky	W	1999–2000	1	4	Milwaukee, WI	October 20, 1978
8 & 25	Zbynek Neckar	D	1998–2000	2	16	Pisek, Czech	September 22, 1978
