= Montreal Canadiens =

National Hockey League team in Montreal, Quebec

Montreal Canadiens; Canadiens de Montréal
- 2026–27 Montreal Canadiens season
- Conference: Eastern
- Division: Atlantic
- Founded: 1909
- History: Montreal Canadiens; 1910–1917 (NHA); 1917–present (NHL)
- Home arena: Bell Centre
- City: Montreal, Quebec
- Team colours: Red, white, blue
- Media: English: TSN; TSN Radio 690; French: RDS; 98.5 FM
- Owners: Molson family (majority owner); (Geoff Molson, chairman)
- General manager: Kent Hughes
- Head coach: Martin St. Louis
- Captain: Nick Suzuki
- Minor league affiliates: Laval Rocket (AHL); Trois-Rivières Lions (ECHL)
- Stanley Cups: 24 (1915–16, 1923–24, 1929–30, 1930–31, 1943–44, 1945–46, 1952–53, 1955–56, 1956–57, 1957–58, 1958–59, 1959–60, 1964–65, 1965–66, 1967–68, 1968–69, 1970–71, 1972–73, 1975–76, 1976–77, 1977–78, 1978–79, 1985–86, 1992–93) (Note: While the Montreal Canadiens have won 24 Stanley Cups, they have actually won 27 league championships, as the Stanley Cup predates the NHA/NHL and was an inter-league championship prior to 1926. The Canadiens won two titles with the National Hockey Association, winning a Stanley Cup in 1916 and losing in 1917. The Canadiens have won 25 league titles in the National Hockey League, winning 23 Stanley Cups. As NHL champion, Montreal failed to win the Stanley Cup in 1919, when the Spanish flu cancelled the Stanley Cup Final against the Seattle Metropolitans of Pacific Coast Hockey Association, and in 1925, when they lost in the Stanley Cup to the Western Canada Hockey League's Victoria Cougars.)
- Conference championships: 8 (1975–76, 1976–77, 1977–78, 1978–79, 1980–81, 1985–86, 1988–89, 1992–93) (Note: Though the Canadiens won the Clarence S. Campbell Bowl and advanced to the Stanley Cup Final in 2021, this does not count as a conference championship. Due to restrictions brought on by the COVID-19 pandemic, the 2020–21 NHL season saw a realignment of teams into new divisions, without any assigned conferences.)
- Presidents' Trophies: 0 (Note: The Presidents' Trophy was not introduced until 1985. Had the trophy existed since league inception, the Canadiens franchise would have won 21 Presidents' Trophies.)
- Division championships: 24 (1927–28, 1928–29, 1930–31, 1931–32, 1936–37, 1967–68, 1968–69, 1972–73, 1974–75, 1975–76, 1976–77, 1977–78, 1978–79, 1979–80, 1980–81, 1981–82, 1984–85, 1987–88, 1988–89, 1991–92, 2007–08, 2012–13, 2014–15, 2016–17)
- Official website: nhl.com/canadiens

The Montreal Canadiens (Note: Even in English, the French spelling Canadiens is always used instead of Canadians. The French spelling of Montréal is also sometimes used in English-speaking media.) (French: Canadiens de Montréal, lit. 'Canadians of Montreal'), officially Club de hockey Canadien (lit. 'Canadian hockey club') and colloquially known as the Habs, (Note: Other nicknames for the team include Le Canadien, Le Bleu-Blanc-Rouge, La Sainte-Flanelle, Le Tricolore, Les Glorieux (or Nos Glorieux), Le CH, Le Grand Club, Les Plombiers, and Les Habitants (from which "Habs" is derived).) are a professional ice hockey team based in Montreal. The Canadiens compete in the National Hockey League (NHL) as a member of the Atlantic Division in the Eastern Conference. Since 1996, the team has played its home games at the Bell Centre, originally known as the Molson Centre. The Canadiens previously played at the Montreal Forum, which housed the team for seven decades and all but their first two Stanley Cup championships. (Note: Earlier venues for the Canadiens include Jubilee Rink, Montreal Westmount Arena, and Mount Royal Arena.)

Founded in 1909, the Canadiens are the oldest continuously operating professional ice hockey team worldwide, and the only existing NHL club to predate the founding of the league. One of the earliest North American professional sports franchises, the Canadiens' history predates that of every other Canadian franchise outside the Canadian Football League's Toronto Argonauts, as well as every American franchise outside baseball and the National Football League's Arizona Cardinals. The franchise is one of the "Original Six", the teams that made up the NHL from 1942 until the 1967 expansion. The team's championship season in 1992–93 marked the last time a Canadian team won the Stanley Cup.

The Canadiens have won the Stanley Cup 24 times, more times than any other franchise, having earned 23 victories since the founding of the NHL, and 22 since 1927, when NHL teams became the only ones to compete for the Stanley Cup. The Canadiens also had the most championships by a team of any of the major North American sports leagues until the New York Yankees won their 25th World Series title in 1999.

== History ==
The Montreal Hockey Club was the first team in Montreal, being active from 1884 to 1932. The team was also the first organized hockey club to have the team name etched on the Stanley Cup in 1893. The Canadiens were founded by J. Ambrose O'Brien on December 4, 1909, as a charter member of the National Hockey Association (NHA), the forerunner to the National Hockey League. It was to be the team of the francophone community in Montreal, composed of francophone players, and under francophone ownership as soon as possible. The founders named the team "Les Canadiens", a term identified at the time with French speakers. The team's inaugural season was not a success, as they placed last in the league. After their first year, ownership was transferred to George Kennedy of Montreal and the team's record improved over the next seasons. The team won its first Stanley Cup championship in the 1915–16 season. In 1917, with four other NHA teams, the Canadiens formed the NHL, and they won their first NHL Stanley Cup during the 1923–24 season, led by Howie Morenz. The team moved from the Mount Royal Arena to the Montreal Forum for the 1926–27 season.

The club began the 1930s decade successfully, with back-to-back Stanley Cup wins in 1930 and 1931. However, the Canadiens, along with cross-town rivals the Montreal Maroons, declined both on the ice and economically during the Great Depression era. Losses grew to the point where team owners considered selling interest to Cleveland, Ohio, though local investors were ultimately found to finance the Canadiens. After the Maroons suspended operations following the 1937–38 season, several of their players joined the Canadiens.

Led by the "Punch Line" of Maurice "Rocket" Richard, Toe Blake and Elmer Lach in the 1940s, the Canadiens enjoyed success again atop the NHL. From 1953 to 1960, the franchise won six Stanley Cups, including a record five straight from 1956 to 1960, with a new set of stars coming to prominence: Jean Béliveau, Dickie Moore, Doug Harvey, Bernie "Boom Boom" Geoffrion, Jacques Plante and Richard's younger brother, Henri.

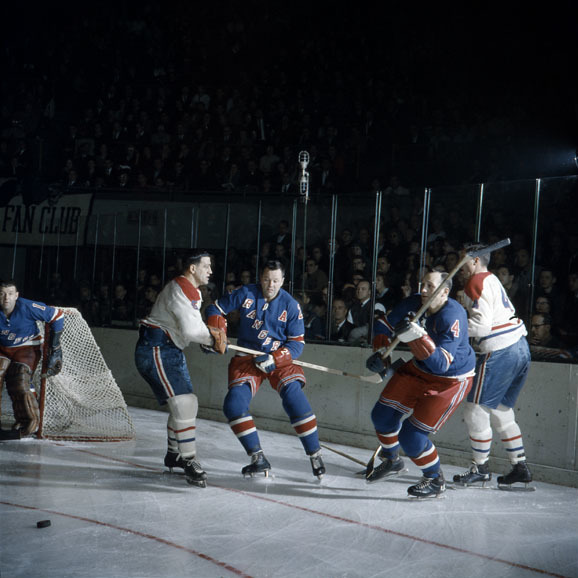
Game between the Canadiens and the New York Rangers in 1962.

The Canadiens added ten more championships in 15 seasons from 1965 to 1979, with another dynastic run of four-straight Cups from 1976 to 1979. In the 1976–77 season, the Canadiens set three still-standing team records – fewest losses (8) in an 80-game season, the longest home unbeaten streak (34), and best goal differential (+216) – with one additional record that lasted almost half a century for the most points (132) in an 80-game season until it was surpassed by the 2022–23 Boston Bruins. In the 1977–78 season, the team had a 28-game unbeaten streak, the second-longest in NHL history. The next generation of stars included Guy Lafleur, Yvan Cournoyer, Ken Dryden, Pete Mahovlich, Jacques Lemaire, Pierre Larouche, Steve Shutt, Bob Gainey, Serge Savard, Guy Lapointe and Larry Robinson. Scotty Bowman, who would later set a record for most NHL victories by a coach, was the team's head coach for its last five Stanley Cup victories in the 1970s.

The Canadiens won Stanley Cups in 1986, led by rookie star goaltender Patrick Roy, and in 1993, continuing their streak of winning at least one championship in every decade from the 1910s to the 1990s (this streak came to an end in the 2000s). In March 1996, the team moved from the Montreal Forum, its home during 70 seasons and 22 Stanley Cups, to the Molson Centre (now called Bell Centre).

Following Roy's departure in 1995, the Canadiens fell into an extended stretch of mediocrity, missing the playoffs in four of their next ten seasons and failing to advance past the second round of the playoffs until 2010. By the late 1990s, with both an ailing team and monetary losses exacerbated by a record-low value of the Canadian dollar, Montreal fans feared their team would end up relocated to the United States. Team owner Molson Brewery sold control of the franchise and the Molson Centre to American businessman George N. Gillett Jr. in 2001, with the right of first refusal for any future sale by Gillett and a condition that the NHL Board of Governors must unanimously approve any attempt to move to a new city. Led by club president Pierre Boivin, the Canadiens returned to being a lucrative enterprise, earning additional revenues from broadcasting and arena events. In 2009, Gillett sold the franchise to a consortium led by the Molson family which included The Woodbridge Company, BCE/Bell, the Fonds de solidarité FTQ, Michael Andlauer, Luc Bertrand and the National Bank Financial Group for $575 million, more than double the $275 million he spent on the purchase eight years prior.

During the 2008–09 season, the Canadiens celebrated their 100th anniversary with various events, including hosting both the 2009 NHL All-Star Game, and the 2009 NHL entry draft.

The Canadiens became the first team in NHL history to reach 3,000 victories with their 5–2 victory over the Florida Panthers on December 29, 2008.

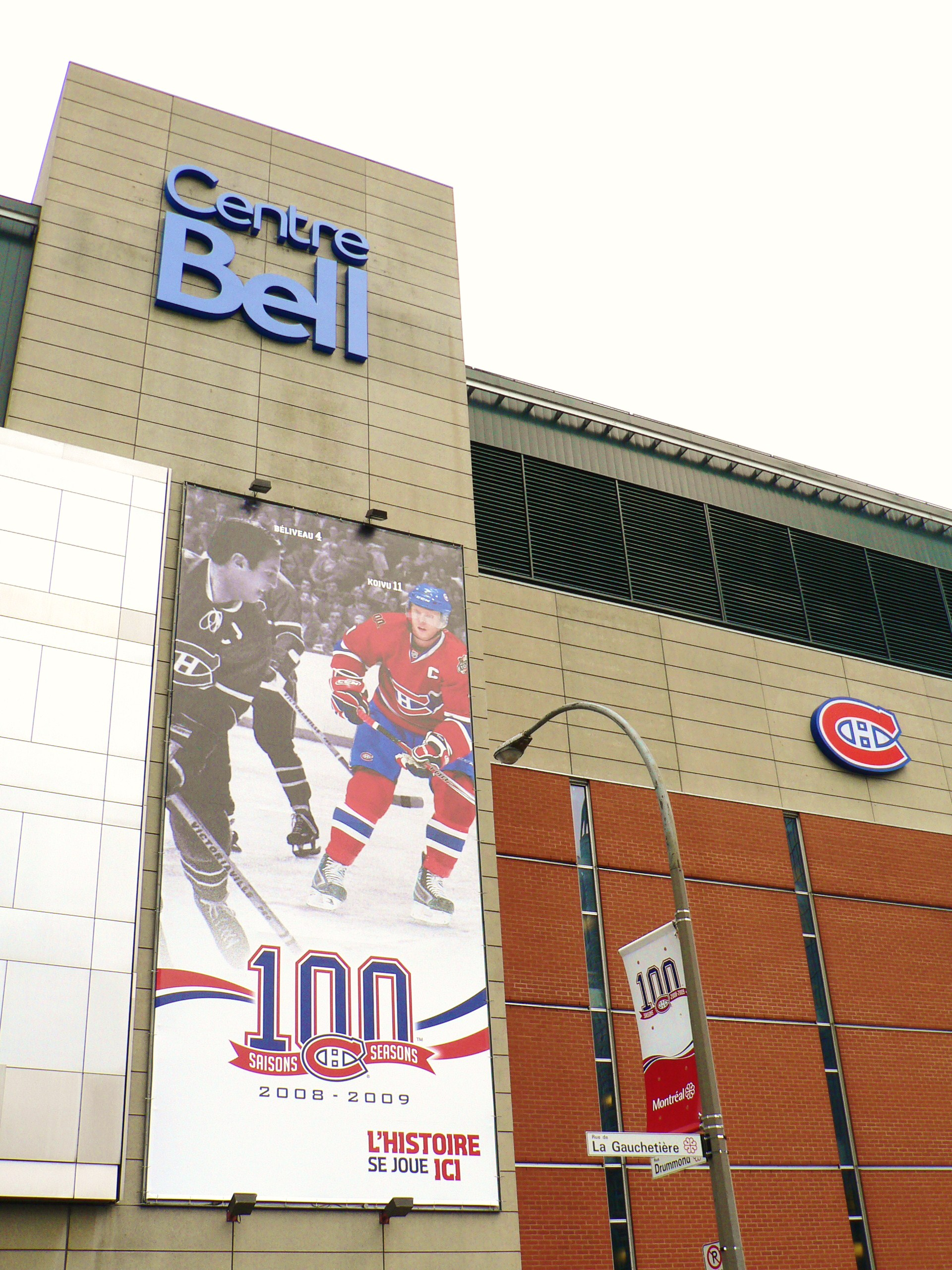
The Bell Centre with banners celebrating the Montreal Canadiens centennial.

For the 2020–21 season, the league moved the Canadiens along with the other six teams from Canada to the North Division. Due to the COVID-19 pandemic, the Canadiens only played against teams in the division in the regular season to avoid travel restrictions between the United States and Canada. All teams in the division played without fans to begin the season. The Canadiens advanced through the 2021 Stanley Cup playoffs, beating the Toronto Maple Leafs in the first round of the playoffs 4–3, overcoming a 3–1 Maple Leafs lead in the series. The Canadiens then swept the Winnipeg Jets in the second round, advancing to the Stanley Cup semifinals. After defeating the Vegas Golden Knights in the penultimate round, clinching an overtime victory in game 6 of the series, they reached their first Stanley Cup Final in 28 years, whilst also being the first Canadian team to do so since the Vancouver Canucks in 2011. Montreal eventually lost the Stanley Cup Final to the Tampa Bay Lightning, 4–1.

In 2021–22, the Canadiens were unable to replicate their success from the prior season, ultimately finishing last in the league for the first time since the 1939–40 season and the first time in the NHL's expansion era, in what was one of the worst seasons in the team's history. In the process, they set team records for most regulation losses (49), most goals against (319), fewest wins (22), (Note: Minimum 70-game schedule.) and fewest points (55), while their .335 point percentage was the team's third-worst ever, after only the 1925–26 (.319) and 1939–40 (.260) campaigns. As a result, team owner Geoff Molson authorized a "rebuild" of the roster over an extended period, a first in the modern history of the franchise. The Canadiens finished fifth-last in the subsequent 2022–23 and 2023–24 seasons.

== Team identity ==
The Canadiens organization operates in both English and French. For many years, public address announcements and press releases have been given in both languages, and the team website and social media outlets are in both languages as well. At home games, the first stanza of O Canada is sung in French, and the chorus is sung in English.

=== Crest and sweater design ===
Early logos used by the Canadiens

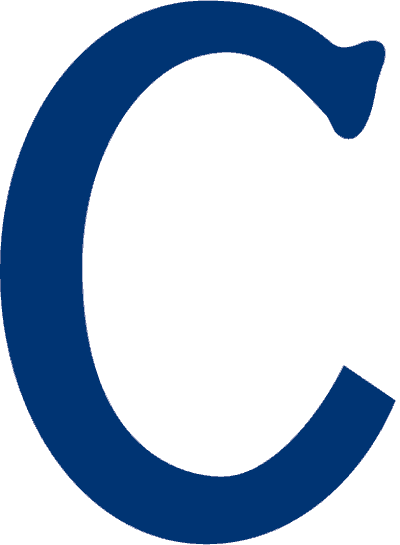
Logo used from 1909 to 1910

Logo used from 1912 to 1913

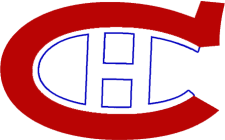
Original design of the "CHC" logo (1917–1919, 1921–1922)

The classic "C" and "H" in the Canadiens' logo, one of the sport's oldest and most recognizable, were first used together in the 1917–18 season, when the club changed its name from "Club Athlétique Canadien" to "Club de Hockey Canadien", before evolving to its current form in 1952–53. Previous logo iterations had simply a "C" for "Canadiens" in 1909–10 and a "C" with an "A" inside from 1913 to 1916, with the "A" standing for "Athlétique". The "H" stands for "Hockey" in the 1917–18 team name ("Club de Hockey Canadien"), not "Habitants", a popular misconception. In Quebec history, habitants were francophone settlers who farmed the land along both shores of the St. Lawrence River and the Gulf of St. Lawrence. As a nickname for the hockey team, "Habitants" is attested in French on 9 February 1914 in a Le Devoir report of a 9–3 win over Toronto. According to About.com, the first man to refer to the team as "the Habs" was Tex Rickard, owner of the Madison Square Garden, in 1924. Rickard apparently told a reporter that the "H" on the Canadiens' sweaters was for "Habitants".

Since 1911, the team's primary colours have been blue, white and red. The home sweater is predominantly red, with four blue-and-white stripes: one across each arm, one across the chest, and one across the waistline. The main road sweater is white with a red-and-blue stripe across the waist, red at the end of both sleeves, and red shoulder yokes. The basic design has been in use since 1914 and took its current form in 1925, evolving as materials changed. Because of the team's long history and significance in Quebec, the sweater has been called 'La Sainte-Flanelle' ("the holy flannel sweater").

As of 2015, the Canadiens' home red sweater is the league's only uniform to feature the French language version of the NHL shield logo (LNH) on the neck collar, in acknowledgment of Montreal's French Canadian heritage. The road white sweater has the English NHL shield logo.

The Canadiens used multiple other designs before 1914. The original shirt of the 1909–10 season was blue with a white C. The second season had a red shirt featuring a green maple leaf with the C logo and green pants. In the season before they adopted the current look, the Canadiens wore a "barber pole" jersey with red, white, and blue stripes, and a logo with a white maple leaf reading "CAC" ("Club athlétique Canadien"). All three designs were worn during the 2009–10 season as part of the Canadiens' centenary.

In the 2020–21 season, the Canadiens unveiled a "Reverse Retro" alternate uniform in collaboration with Adidas. The uniform was essentially the same as their regular red uniform, but with blue as the primary colour and red as the stripe colour. A second iteration was released in the 2022–23 season, again using the same template but with red relegated to the logo only and featuring a light blue base with white/dark blue/white stripes.

This period also saw the introduction of corporate sponsor advertising across NHL-sanctioned equipment, starting with helmet ads and followed by front jersey patches on gameday uniforms. Contextually, the Canadiens' away jerseys feature the Air Canada logo in the upper right chest area, while the name and shield of the Royal Bank of Canada (RBC) is stitched onto its home counterpart.

The Canadiens wore two other uniforms in the 2026–27 season. The "Hometown Remix" uniform featured a white base with mostly red accents, featuring a modified Canadiens logo on the chest in white with red trim. A white pine, fleur-de-lys, rose, thistle and clover adorned the sleeves below the lone blue stripe, along with new typography inspired by Old Montreal. They also donned a special uniform for the 2026 NHL Heritage Classic, essentially their classic red sweater with the 1920s Canadiens crest in felt with vintage white accents.

The Canadiens' colours are a readily identifiable aspect of French Canadian culture. In the short story "The Hockey Sweater", Roch Carrier described the influence of the Canadiens and their jersey in rural Quebec communities during the 1940s. The story was adapted into an animated short, The Sweater, narrated by Carrier. A passage from the short story appears on the 2002 issuance of the Canadian five-dollar bill.

=== Motto ===
Nos bras meurtris vous tendent le flambeau, à vous toujours de le porter bien haut.

To you from failing hands we throw the torch. Be yours to hold it high.

The motto is from the poem "In Flanders Fields" by John McCrae, which was written in 1915, the year before the Canadiens won their first Stanley Cup championship. The motto appears on the wall of the Canadiens' dressing room as well as on the inside collar of the new Adidas Adizero jerseys introduced in 2017.

Following the last game at the Forum, every living former Canadiens captain passed down a torch until it reached then-current captain Pierre Turgeon, who became the first to wear the C at the then-Molson Centre. During the 2026 playoffs, a former Canadiens great carried a torch into the Bell Centre to symbolically "ignite" the arena during pregame festivities.

=== Mascot ===
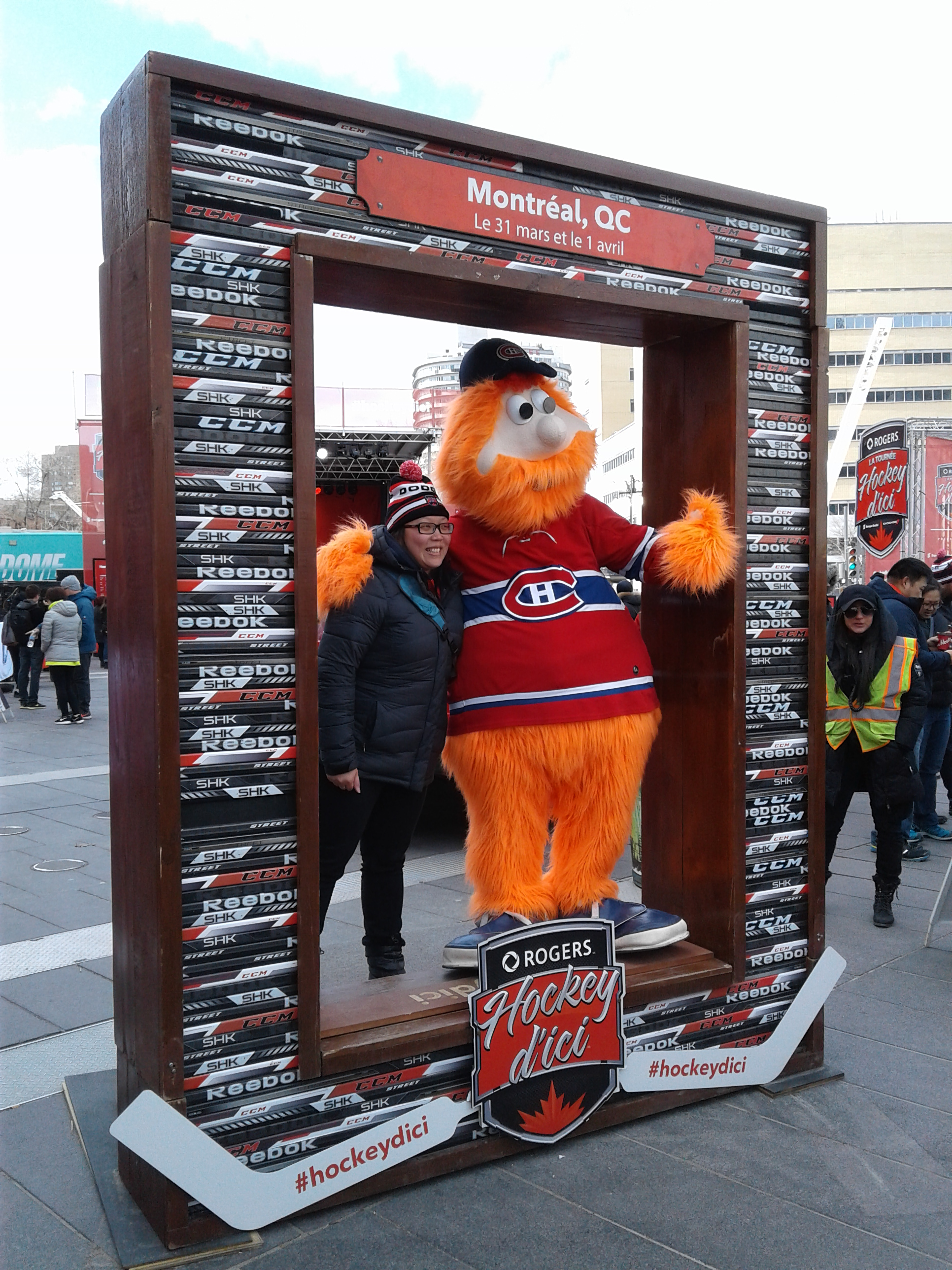
The Canadiens mascot, Youppi!, poses for photographs at a Rogers Media event

Beginning in the 2004–05 season, the Canadiens adopted Youppi! as their official mascot, the first costumed mascot in their long history. The foregoing was the longtime mascot for Major League Baseball (MLB)'s Montreal Expos but was dropped from the franchise when they moved to Washington, D.C. prior to the 2005 MLB season and became the Washington Nationals. With the changeover, Youppi! became the first mascot in professional sports to switch leagues. He is also the first mascot in professional sports to get ejected from a game dating back to his time with the Expos. In June 2020, Youppi! became the first mascot from a Canadian-based club to be inducted into the Mascot Hall of Fame.

In November 2022, the Canadiens introduced METAL!, an "unofficial official mascot", to promote the new Reverse Retro sweaters introduced that season. METAL! was retired ahead of the 2024–25 season (alongside the Reverse Retro initiative), but still occasionally makes appearances at special events.

=== Rivalries ===
==== Toronto Maple Leafs ====
The Canadiens have developed strong rivalries with two fellow Original Six franchises, with whom they frequently shared divisions and competed in postseason play. The oldest is with the Toronto Maple Leafs, who first faced the Canadiens as the Toronto Arenas in 1917. The teams met 16 times in the playoffs, including five Stanley Cup Finals. Featuring the two largest cities in Canada and two of the largest fanbases in the league, the rivalry is sometimes dramatized as being emblematic of Canada's English and French linguistic divide. From 1938 to 1970, they were the only two Canadian teams in the league.

==== Boston Bruins ====
The team's other Original Six rivals are the Boston Bruins, who, since their NHL debut in 1924 have played the Canadiens more than any other team in both regular season play and the playoffs combined. The teams have played 34 playoff series, seven of which were in the finals.

==== Quebec Nordiques (1979–1995) ====
The Canadiens also had an intraprovincial rivalry with the Quebec Nordiques during their existence from 1979 to 1995, nicknamed the "Battle of Quebec".

== Broadcasting ==
Montreal Canadiens games are broadcast locally in both the French and English languages. CHMP 98.5 is the Canadiens' French-language radio flagship. The station began simulcasting Canadiens games with sister station CKAC in 2007 due to the latter's weaker nighttime signal, and became sole flagship in 2011 after CKAC switched from an all-sports to an all-traffic format in 2011. Martin McGuire is the French play-by-play voice, with Dany Dubé on colour commentary.

As of the 2017–18 season, the team's regional television rights in both languages, and its English-language radio rights, are held by Bell Media. CKGM, TSN Radio 690, is the English-language radio flagship; it acquired the rights under a seven-year deal which began in the 2011–12 season. In June 2017, Bell Media reached a five-year extension.

Regional television rights in French are held by Réseau des sports (RDS) under a 12-year deal that began in the 2014–15 season. A sister to the English-language network TSN, RDS was the only French-language sports channel in Canada until the 2011 launch of TVA Sports, and was also the previous national French rightsholder of the NHL; as a result, the Canadiens forwent a separate regional contract, and allowed all of its games to be televised nationally in French as part of RDS's overall NHL rights.

With TVA Sports becoming the national French rightsholder in the 2014–15 season through a sub-licensing agreement with Sportsnet, RDS subsequently announced a 12-year deal to maintain regional rights to Canadiens games not shown on TVA Sports. As a result, games on RDS are blacked out outside the Canadiens' home market of Quebec, Atlantic Canada and Ontario from Pembroke eastward shared with the Ottawa Senators. At least 22 Canadiens games per season (primarily through its Saturday night La super soirée LNH), including all playoff games, are televised nationally by TVA Sports.

TSN2 assumed the English-language regional television rights in the 2017–18 season, with John Bartlett on play-by-play, and Dave Poulin, Mike Johnson and Craig Button on colour commentary. All other games, including all playoff games, are televised nationally by Sportsnet or CBC. Bartlett returned to Sportsnet over the 2018 off-season, and was succeeded by Bryan Mudryk.

English-language regional rights were previously held by Sportsnet East (with CJNT City Montreal as an overflow channel), under a three-year deal that expired following the 2016–17 season; the games were called by Bartlett and Jason York. Prior to this deal, TSN held the rights from 2010 through 2014; the games were broadcast on a part-time channel with Dave Randorf on play-by-play.

== Season-by-season record ==
This is a list of the last five seasons completed by the Canadiens. For the full season-by-season history, see List of Montreal Canadiens seasons.

Note: GP = Games played, W = Wins, L = Losses, T = Ties, OTL = Overtime Losses, Pts = Points, GF = Goals for, GA = Goals against

| Season | GP | W | L | OTL | Pts | GF | GA | Finish | Playoffs |
|---|---|---|---|---|---|---|---|---|---|
| 2021–22 | 82 | 22 | 49 | 11 | 55 | 221 | 319 | 8th, Atlantic | Did not qualify |
| 2022–23 | 82 | 31 | 45 | 6 | 68 | 232 | 307 | 8th, Atlantic | Did not qualify |
| 2023–24 | 82 | 30 | 36 | 16 | 76 | 236 | 289 | 8th, Atlantic | Did not qualify |
| 2024–25 | 82 | 40 | 31 | 11 | 91 | 245 | 265 | 5th, Atlantic | Lost in first round, 1–4 (Capitals) |
| 2025–26 | 82 | 48 | 24 | 10 | 106 | 283 | 256 | 3rd, Atlantic | Lost in conference finals, 1–4 (Hurricanes) |

== Players and personnel ==
=== Current roster ===
Updated November 16, 2026

| No. | Nat | Player | Pos | S/G | Age | Acquired | Birthplace |
|---|---|---|---|---|---|---|---|
| 17 | (Canada) | Josh Anderson (A) | RW | R | 32 | 2020 | Burlington, Ontario |
| 62 | (Canada) | Owen Beck | C | R | 22 | 2022 | Port Hope, Ontario |
| 37 | (United States) | Brett Berard | LW | L | 24 | 2026 | East Greenwich, Rhode Island |
| 76 | (Canada) | Zachary Bolduc | LW | L | 23 | 2025 | Trois-Rivières, Quebec |
| 45 | (Canada) | Alexandre Carrier | D | R | 30 | 2024 | Quebec City, Quebec |
| 13 | (United States) | Cole Caufield | RW | R | 25 | 2019 | Mosinee, Wisconsin |
| 77 | (Canada) | Kirby Dach | C | R | 25 | 2022 | Fort Saskatchewan, Alberta |
| 24 | (Canada) | Phillip Danault | C | L | 33 | 2025 | Victoriaville, Quebec |
| 93 | (Russia) | Ivan Demidov | RW | L | 20 | 2024 | Sergiyev Posad, Russia |
| 75 | (Czech Republic) | Jakub Dobeš | G | L | 25 | 2020 | Ostrava, Czech Republic |
| 53 | (Canada) | Noah Dobson | D | R | 26 | 2025 | Summerside, Prince Edward Island |
| 42 | (Sweden) | Adam Engström | D | L | 23 | 2022 | Jarna, Sweden |
| 71 | (Canada) | Jake Evans | C | R | 30 | 2014 | Toronto, Ontario |
| 32 | (United States) | Jacob Fowler | G | L | 22 | 2023 | Melbourne, Florida |
| 21 | (Canada) | Kaiden Guhle | D | L | 24 | 2020 | Sherwood Park, Alberta |
| 48 | (United States) | Lane Hutson | D | L | 22 | 2022 | Holland, Michigan |
| 91 | (Finland) | Oliver Kapanen | C | R | 23 | 2021 | Timrå, Sweden |
| 22 | (United States) | Chris Kreider | LW | L | 35 | 2026 | Boxford, Massachusetts |
| 8 | (Canada) | Mike Matheson (A) | D | L | 32 | 2022 | Pointe-Claire, Quebec |
| 35 | (Canada) | Sam Montembeault | G | L | 30 | 2021 | Bécancour, Quebec |
| 15 | (Canada) | Alex Newhook | C | L | 25 | 2023 | St. John's, Newfoundland |
| 64 | (Austria) | David Reinbacher | D | R | 22 | 2023 | Hohenems, Austria |
| 20 | (Slovakia) | Juraj Slafkovský | LW | L | 22 | 2022 | Košice, Slovakia |
| 14 | (Canada) | Nick Suzuki (C) | C | R | 27 | 2018 | London, Ontario |
| 85 | (France) | Alexandre Texier | LW | L | 27 | 2025 | Saint-Martin-d'Hères, France |
| 72 | (Canada) | Arber Xhekaj | D | L | 25 | 2021 | Hamilton, Ontario |
| 63 | (Canada) | Florian Xhekaj | LW | L | 22 | 2023 | Hamilton, Ontario |

=== Honoured members ===
==== Retired numbers ====
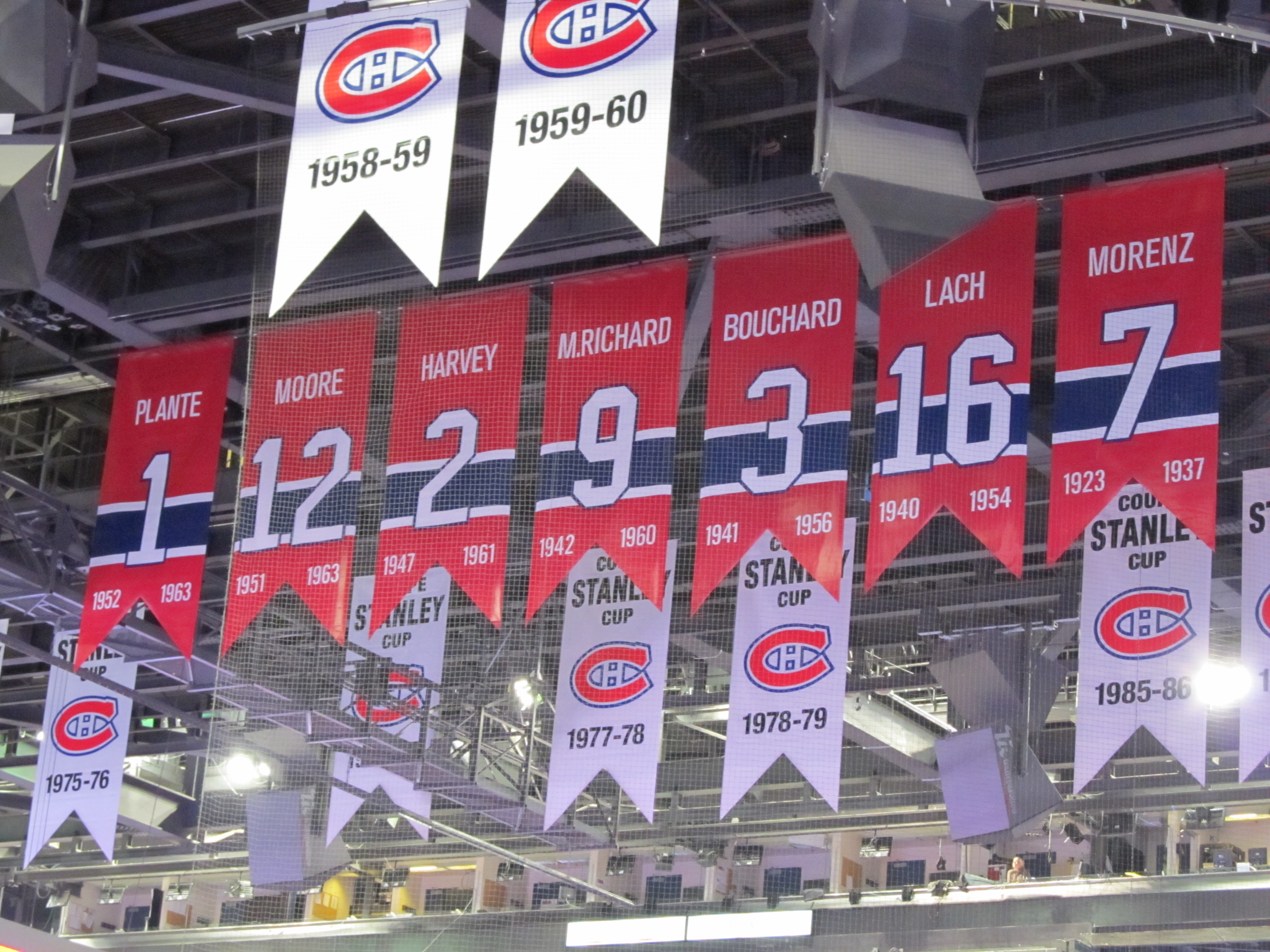
Some of the retired numbers at Bell Centre, photographed in 2010

Collectively, the Canadiens have retired 15 numbers in honour of 18 players, the most of any team in the NHL. All honourees were born in Canada and were members of at least two Stanley Cup winning Canadiens teams. Howie Morenz was the first honouree, on November 2, 1937. The NHL retired Wayne Gretzky's No. 99 for all its member teams at the 2000 NHL All-Star Game.

Montreal Canadiens retired numbers
| No. | Player | Position | Tenure | Date of honour |
|---|---|---|---|---|
| 1 | Jacques Plante | G | 1952–1963 | October 7, 1995 |
| 2 | Doug Harvey | D | 1947–1961 | October 26, 1985 |
| 3 | Émile Bouchard | D | 1941–1956 | December 4, 2009 |
| 4 | Jean Béliveau | C | 1950–1971 | October 9, 1971 (Note: The ceremony originally honoured Béliveau and Aurèle Joliat, who each wore the number as Hall of Fame players for Montreal. For unknown reasons, the Canadiens only recognize having retired the number for Béliveau.) |
| 5 | Bernie Geoffrion | RW | 1950–1964 | March 11, 2006 |
| 5 | Guy Lapointe | D | 1968–1982 | November 8, 2014 |
| 7 | Howie Morenz | C | 1923–1937 | November 2, 1937 |
| 9 | Maurice Richard | RW | 1942–1960 | October 6, 1960 |
| 10 | Guy Lafleur | RW | 1971–1985 | February 16, 1985 |
| 12 | Dickie Moore | LW | 1951–1963 | November 12, 2005 |
| 12 | Yvan Cournoyer | RW | 1963–1979 | November 12, 2005 |
| 16 | Henri Richard | C | 1955–1975 | December 10, 1975 |
| 16 | Elmer Lach | C | 1940–1954 | December 4, 2009 |
| 18 | Serge Savard | D | 1966–1981 | November 18, 2006 |
| 19 | Larry Robinson | D | 1972–1989 | November 19, 2007 |
| 23 | Bob Gainey | LW | 1973–1989 | February 23, 2008 |
| 29 | Ken Dryden | G | 1970–1979 | January 29, 2007 |
| 33 | Patrick Roy | G | 1984–1995 | November 22, 2008 |

==== Hall of Fame ====
The Montreal Canadiens have an affiliation with a number of inductees to the Hockey Hall of Fame. Thirty-seven of these players are from three separate notable dynasties: 12 from 1955 to 1960, 11 from 1964 to 1969, and 13 from 1975 to 1979. Howie Morenz and Georges Vézina were the first Canadiens given the honour in 1945, while Shea Weber was the most recently inducted, in 2024. Along with players, a number of inductees from the builders category are affiliated with the club. The first inductee was vice president William Northey in 1945. The most recent inductee was Pat Burns in 2014.

In addition to players and builders, seven broadcasters for the Montreal Canadiens have been awarded the Foster Hewitt Memorial Award from the Hockey Hall of Fame. The first two recipients of the award were Danny Gallivan and René Lecavalier in 1984. The other five award recipients are Doug Smith (1985), Dick Irvin Jr. (1988), Richard Garneau (1999), Gilles Tremblay (2002), and Pierre Houde (2024).

Players

- Marty Barry
- Jean Béliveau
- Toe Blake
- Émile Bouchard
- Harry Cameron
- Guy Carbonneau
- Chris Chelios
- Sprague Cleghorn
- Yvan Cournoyer
- Gord Drillon
- Ken Dryden
- Dick Duff
- Bill Durnan
- Tony Esposito
- Bob Gainey
- Herb Gardiner
- Bernard Geoffrion
- Doug Gilmour
- George Hainsworth
- Joe Hall
- Doug Harvey
- Tom Johnson
- Aurele Joliat
- Elmer Lach
- Guy Lafleur
- Newsy Lalonde
- Rod Langway
- Jacques Laperrière
- Guy Lapointe
- Jack Laviolette
- Jacques Lemaire
- Frank Mahovlich
- Joe Malone
- Sylvio Mantha
- Dickie Moore
- Howie Morenz
- Reg Noble
- Buddy O'Connor
- Bert Olmstead
- Didier Pitre
- Jacques Plante
- Carey Price
- Ken Reardon
- Mark Recchi
- Henri Richard
- Maurice Richard
- Larry Robinson
- Patrick Roy
- Denis Savard
- Serge Savard
- Steve Shutt
- Babe Siebert
- Tommy Smith
- Pierre Turgeon
- Rogatien Vachon
- Georges Vézina
- Shea Weber
- Gump Worsley
- Roy Worters

Builders

- Scotty Bowman
- Pat Burns
- Joe Cattarinich
- Leo Dandurand
- Tommy Gorman
- Dick Irvin
- Hartland Molson
- William Northey
- Ambrose O'Brien
- Sam Pollock
- Donat Raymond
- Frank Selke

=== Team captains ===
- Jack Laviolette, 1909–1910, 1911–1912
- Newsy Lalonde, 1910–1911, 1912–1913, 1916–1922
- Jimmy Gardner, 1913–1915
- Howard McNamara, 1915–1916
- Sprague Cleghorn, 1922–1925
- Billy Coutu, 1925–1926
- Sylvio Mantha, 1926–1932, 1933–1936
- George Hainsworth, 1932–1933
- Babe Siebert, 1936–1939
- Walter Buswell, 1939–1940
- Toe Blake, 1940–1948
- Bill Durnan, 1948 (January–April)
- Émile Bouchard, 1948–1956
- Maurice Richard, 1956–1960
- Doug Harvey, 1960–1961
- Jean Béliveau, 1961–1971
- Henri Richard, 1971–1975
- Yvan Cournoyer, 1975–1979
- Serge Savard, 1979–1981
- Bob Gainey, 1981–1989
- Guy Carbonneau and Chris Chelios, 1989–1990 (co-captains)
- Guy Carbonneau, 1990–1994
- Kirk Muller, 1994–1995
- Mike Keane, 1995 (April–December)
- Pierre Turgeon, 1995–1996
- Vincent Damphousse, 1996–1999
- Saku Koivu, 1999–2009
- Brian Gionta, 2010–2014
- Max Pacioretty, 2015–2018
- Shea Weber, 2018–2022
- Nick Suzuki, 2022–present

=== Head coaches ===
- Joe Cattarinich and Jack Laviolette, 1909–1910
- Adolphe Lecours, 1911
- Napoléon Dorval, 1911–1913
- Jimmy Gardner, 1913–1915
- Newsy Lalonde, 1915–1921, 1932–1934
- Léo Dandurand, 1921–1926
- Cecil Hart, 1926–1932, 1936–1938
- Newsy Lalonde and Leo Dandurand, 1934–1935
- Sylvio Mantha, 1935–1936
- Cecil Hart and Jules Dugal, 1938–1939
- Babe Siebert, 1939
- Alfred "Pit" Lépine, 1939–1940
- Dick Irvin, 1940–55
- Hector "Toe" Blake, 1955–1968
- Claude Ruel, 1968–1970, 1979–1981
- Al MacNeil, 1970–1971
- Scotty Bowman, 1971–1979
- Bernie Geoffrion, 1979
- Bob Berry, 1981–1984
- Jacques Lemaire, 1984–1985
- Jean Perron, 1985–1988
- Pat Burns, 1988–1992
- Jacques Demers, 1992–1995
- Mario Tremblay, 1995–1997
- Alain Vigneault, 1997–2000
- Michel Therrien, 2000–2003, 2012–2017
- Claude Julien, 2003–2006, 2017–2021
- Bob Gainey, 2006 (January–May), 2009 (March–June) (interim)
- Guy Carbonneau, 2006–2009
- Jacques Martin, 2009–2011
- Randy Cunneyworth, 2011–2012 (interim)
- Dominique Ducharme, 2021–2022
- Martin St. Louis, 2022–present

=== First-round draft picks ===
- 1963: Garry Monahan (1st overall)
- 1964: Claude Chagnon (6th overall)
- 1965: Pierre Bouchard (5th overall)
- 1966: Phil Myre (5th overall)
- 1967: Elgin McCann (8th overall)
- 1968: Michel Plasse (1st overall), Roger Belisle (2nd overall), Jim Pritchard (3rd overall)
- 1969: Réjean Houle (1st overall), Marc Tardif (2nd overall)
- 1970: Ray Martynuik (5th overall), Chuck Lefley (6th overall)
- 1971: Guy Lafleur (1st overall), Chuck Arnason (7th overall), Murray Wilson (11th overall)
- 1972: Steve Shutt (4th overall), Michel Larocque (6th overall), Dave Gardner (8th overall), John Van Boxmeer (14th overall)
- 1973: Bob Gainey (8th overall)
- 1974: Cam Connor (5th overall), Doug Risebrough (7th overall), Rick Chartraw (10th overall), Mario Tremblay (12th overall), Gord McTavish (15th overall)
- 1975: Robin Sadler (9th overall), Pierre Mondou (15th overall)
- 1976: Peter Lee (12th overall), Rod Schutt (13th overall), Bruce Baker (18th overall)
- 1977: Mark Napier (10th overall), Norm Dupont (18th overall)
- 1978: Danny Geoffrion (8th overall), Dave Hunter (17th overall)
- 1980: Doug Wickenheiser (1st overall)
- 1981: Mark Hunter (7th overall), Gilbert Delorme (18th overall), Jan Ingman (19th overall)
- 1982: Alain Héroux (19th overall)
- 1983: Alfie Turcotte (17th overall)
- 1984: Petr Svoboda (5th overall), Shayne Corson (8th overall)
- 1985: Jose Charbonneau (12th overall), Tom Chorske (16th overall)
- 1986: Mark Pederson (15th overall)
- 1987: Andrew Cassels (17th overall)
- 1988: Éric Charron (20th overall)
- 1989: Lindsay Vallis (13th overall)
- 1990: Turner Stevenson (12th overall)
- 1991: Brent Bilodeau (17th overall)
- 1992: David Wilkie (20th overall)
- 1993: Saku Koivu (21st overall)
- 1994: Brad Brown (18th overall)
- 1995: Terry Ryan (8th overall)
- 1996: Matt Higgins (18th overall)
- 1997: Jason Ward (11th overall)
- 1998: Eric Chouinard (16th overall)
- 2000: Ron Hainsey (13th overall), Marcel Hossa (16th overall)
- 2001: Mike Komisarek (7th overall), Alexander Perezhogin (25th overall)
- 2002: Chris Higgins (14th overall)
- 2003: Andrei Kostitsyn (10th overall)
- 2004: Kyle Chipchura (18th overall)
- 2005: Carey Price (5th overall)
- 2006: David Fischer (20th overall)
- 2007: Ryan McDonagh (12th overall), Max Pacioretty (22nd overall)
- 2009: Louis Leblanc (18th overall)
- 2010: Jarred Tinordi (22nd overall)
- 2011: Nathan Beaulieu (17th overall)
- 2012: Alex Galchenyuk (3rd overall)
- 2013: Michael McCarron (25th overall)
- 2014: Nikita Scherbak (26th overall)
- 2015: Noah Juulsen (26th overall)
- 2016: Mikhail Sergachev (9th overall)
- 2017: Ryan Poehling (25th overall)
- 2018: Jesperi Kotkaniemi (3rd overall)
- 2019: Cole Caufield (15th overall)
- 2020: Kaiden Guhle (16th overall)
- 2021: Logan Mailloux (31st overall)
- 2022: Juraj Slafkovský (1st overall), Filip Mešár (26th overall)
- 2023: David Reinbacher (5th overall)
- 2024: Ivan Demidov (5th overall), Michael Hage (21st overall)
- 2026: Gleb Pugachyov (26th overall)

== Franchise individual records ==
=== Franchise scoring leaders ===
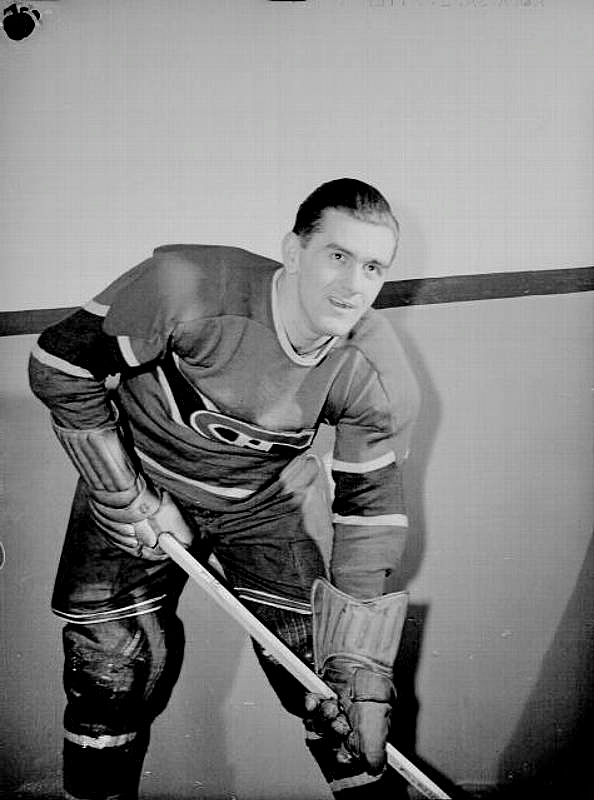
Maurice 'Rocket' Richard is the Canadiens' all-time leader in goals. The trophy awarded annually to the NHL's leading goal scorer is named in honour of Richard.

These are the top-ten point-scorers in franchise history. Figures are updated after each completed NHL regular season.

- * – current Canadiens player

Note: Pos = Position; GP = Games Played; G = Goals; A = Assists; Pts = Points; P/G = Points per game

Points
| Player | Pos | GP | G | A | Pts | P/G |
|---|---|---|---|---|---|---|
| Guy Lafleur | RW | 961 | 518 | 728 | 1,246 | 1.30 |
| Jean Béliveau | C | 1,125 | 507 | 712 | 1,219 | 1.08 |
| Henri Richard | C | 1,256 | 358 | 688 | 1,046 | .83 |
| Maurice Richard | RW | 978 | 544 | 422 | 966 | .99 |
| Larry Robinson | D | 1,202 | 197 | 686 | 883 | .73 |
| Yvan Cournoyer | RW | 968 | 428 | 435 | 863 | .89 |
| Jacques Lemaire | C | 853 | 366 | 469 | 835 | .98 |
| Steve Shutt | LW | 871 | 408 | 368 | 776 | .89 |
| Bernie Geoffrion | RW | 766 | 371 | 388 | 759 | .99 |
| Saku Koivu | C | 792 | 191 | 450 | 641 | .81 |

Goals
| Player | Pos | G |
|---|---|---|
| Maurice Richard | RW | 544 |
| Guy Lafleur | RW | 518 |
| Jean Béliveau | C | 507 |
| Yvan Cournoyer | RW | 428 |
| Steve Shutt | LW | 408 |
| Bernie Geoffrion | RW | 371 |
| Jacques Lemaire | C | 366 |
| Henri Richard | C | 358 |
| Aurèle Joliat | LW | 270 |
| Mario Tremblay | RW | 258 |

Assists
| Player | Pos | A |
|---|---|---|
| Guy Lafleur | RW | 728 |
| Jean Béliveau | C | 712 |
| Henri Richard | C | 688 |
| Larry Robinson | D | 686 |
| Jacques Lemaire | C | 469 |
| Andrei Markov | D | 453 |
| Saku Koivu | C | 450 |
| Yvan Cournoyer | RW | 435 |
| Maurice Richard | RW | 422 |
| Elmer Lach | C | 408 |

=== Franchise goaltending leaders ===
These goaltenders rank in the top ten in franchise history for wins. Figures are updated after each completed NHL season.

- * – current Canadiens player

Note: GP = Games played; W = Wins; L = Losses; T/O = Ties/Overtime losses; GA = Goal against; GAA = Goals against average; SA = Shots against; SV% = Save percentage; SO = Shutouts

Goaltenders
| Player | GP | W | L | T/O | GA | GAA | SA | SV% | SO |
|---|---|---|---|---|---|---|---|---|---|
| Carey Price | 712 | 361 | 261 | 79 | 1,755 | 2.51 | 21,059 | .917 | 49 |
| Jacques Plante | 556 | 314 | 133 | 107 | 1,232 | 2.22 | 13,674 | — | 58 |
| Patrick Roy | 551 | 289 | 175 | 66 | 1,476 | 2.78 | 15,352 | .904 | 29 |
| Ken Dryden | 397 | 258 | 57 | 74 | 870 | 2.24 | 11,083 | .922 | 46 |
| Bill Durnan | 383 | 208 | 112 | 62 | 901 | 2.36 | — | — | 34 |
| George Hainsworth | 318 | 167 | 96 | 54 | 592 | 1.78 | — | — | 75 |
| Michel Larocque | 231 | 144 | 48 | 31 | 624 | 2.83 | 5,855 | .893 | 17 |
| José Théodore | 353 | 141 | 158 | 35 | 876 | 2.62 | 9,833 | .911 | 23 |
| Charlie Hodge | 237 | 119 | 73 | 40 | 563 | 2.46 | 6,031 | — | 21 |
| Gerry McNeil | 276 | 119 | 105 | 52 | 645 | 2.34 | 252 | — | 28 |

=== Records – skaters ===
Career

- Most seasons: 20, Henri Richard
- Most games: 1,256, Henri Richard
- Most goals: 544, Maurice Richard
- Most assists: 728, Guy Lafleur
- Most points: 1,246, Guy Lafleur
- Most penalty minutes: 2,248, Chris Nilan
- Most consecutive games played: 560, Doug Jarvis
- Most Stanley Cups: 11*, Henri Richard

Season

- Most goals in a season: 60, Steve Shutt (1976–77); Guy Lafleur (1977–78)
- Most powerplay goals in a season: 20, Yvan Cournoyer (1966–67)
- Most powerplay goals in a season, defenceman: 19*, Sheldon Souray (2006–07)
- Most assists in a season: 82, Pete Mahovlich (1974–75)
- Most points in a season: 136, Guy Lafleur (1976–77)
- Most penalty minutes in a season: 358, Chris Nilan (1984–85)
- Most points in a season, defenceman: 85, Larry Robinson (1976–77)
- Most points in a season, rookie: 71, Mats Näslund (1982–83); Kjell Dahlin (1985–86)
- Most goals in a season, defenceman: 28, Guy Lapointe (1974–75)

* Indicates a league record.

=== Records – goaltenders ===
Career

- Most games played: 712, Carey Price
- Most seasons: 16, Georges Vézina
- Most shutouts: 75, George Hainsworth
- Most wins: 361, Carey Price
- Most Stanley Cups: 6*, Ken Dryden, Charlie Hodge, Jacques Plante

Season

- Most games in a season: 72, Carey Price (2010–11)
- Most wins in a season: 44, Carey Price (2014–15)
- Most shutouts in a season: 22*, George Hainsworth (1928–29)

* Indicates a league record.

== See also ==
- Bell Sports Complex
- List of Montreal Canadiens award winners
- List of Montreal Canadiens players
- List of Montreal Canadiens goaltenders
- List of Montreal Canadiens general managers
- List of Montreal Canadiens presidents
- Montreal Junior Canadiens

== Notes ==
Awards and achievements
| Preceded by Vancouver Millionaires | Stanley Cup champions 1915–16 | Succeeded by Seattle Metropolitans |
| Preceded by Ottawa Senators | Stanley Cup champions 1923–24 | Succeeded by Victoria Cougars |
| Preceded by Boston Bruins | Stanley Cup champions 1929–30, 1930–31 | Succeeded by Toronto Maple Leafs |
| Preceded by Detroit Red Wings | Stanley Cup champions 1943–44 | Succeeded by Toronto Maple Leafs |
| Preceded by Toronto Maple Leafs | Stanley Cup champions 1945–46 | Succeeded by Toronto Maple Leafs |
| Preceded by Detroit Red Wings | Stanley Cup champions 1952–53 | Succeeded by Detroit Red Wings |
| Preceded by Detroit Red Wings | Stanley Cup champions 1955–56, 1956–57, 1957–58, 1958–59, 1959–60 | Succeeded by Chicago Black Hawks |
| Preceded by Toronto Maple Leafs | Stanley Cup champions 1964–65, 1965–66 | Succeeded by Toronto Maple Leafs |
| Preceded by Toronto Maple Leafs | Stanley Cup champions 1967–68, 1968–69 | Succeeded by Boston Bruins |
| Preceded by Boston Bruins | Stanley Cup champions 1970–71 | Succeeded by Boston Bruins |
| Preceded by Boston Bruins | Stanley Cup champions 1972–73 | Succeeded by Philadelphia Flyers |
| Preceded by Philadelphia Flyers | Stanley Cup champions 1975–76, 1976–77, 1977–78, 1978–79 | Succeeded by New York Islanders |
| Preceded by Edmonton Oilers | Stanley Cup champions 1985–86 | Succeeded by Edmonton Oilers |
| Preceded by Pittsburgh Penguins | Stanley Cup champions 1992–93 | Succeeded by New York Rangers |
