= 1992–93 Wichita Thunder season =

1992–93 Wichita Thunder
- League: 6th CHL
- 1992–93 record: 25-32-2
- Goals for: 242
- Goals against: 320

Team information
- General manager: Bill Shuck
- Coach: Doug Shedden
- Arena: Britt Brown Arena
- Average attendance: 4474

Team leaders
- Goals: Dave Gatti (35)
- Assists: Ted Dent (44)
- Points: Ted Dent (69)
- Penalty minutes: Greg Neish (212)
- Wins: Robert Desjardins (21)
- Goals against average: Robert Desjardins (4.63)

The 1992–93 Wichita Thunder season was the first season of the CHL franchise in Wichita, Kansas. Doug Shedden replaced Gary Fay as coach mid-season, switching to a stronger defensive strategy. While the team finished the season in last place overall, it had the best record in the CHL in the final 15 games (9–5–1).

== Regular season ==
=== League standings ===
Central Hockey League	GP	W	L	T	GF	GA	Pts
y-Oklahoma City Blazers	60	39	18	3	291	232	81
x-Tulsa Oilers	60	35	22	3	270	230	73
x-Dallas Freeze	60	31	25	4	276	242	66
x-Memphis RiverKings	60	26	27	7	253	272	59
e-Fort Worth Fire	60	24	29	7	252	288	55
e-Wichita Thunder	60	25	33	2	242	320	52

Note: y - clinched league title; x - clinched playoff spot; e - eliminated from playoff contention

== Awards ==
Regular Season
Player	Award	Date
Robert Desjardins	CHL Rookie of the Year	March 1993

== See also ==
- 1992–93 CHL season
