= 1992–93 CHL season =

- League: Central Hockey League
- Sport: Ice hockey

Regular season
- Adams’ Cup: Oklahoma City Blazers
- Season MVP: Sylvain Fleury (Oklahoma City)
- Top scorer: Sylvain Fleury (Oklahoma City)

Finals
- Champions: Tulsa Oilers
- Runners-up: Oklahoma City Blazers

CHL seasons
- 1993–94

The 1992–93 CHL season was the first season of the Central Hockey League (CHL).

== Teams ==
1992-93 Central Hockey League
Team	City	Arena
Dallas Freeze	Dallas, Texas	Fair Park Coliseum
Fort Worth Fire	Fort Worth, Texas	Fort Worth Convention Center
Memphis RiverKings	Memphis, Tennessee	Mid-South Coliseum
Oklahoma City Blazers	Oklahoma City, Oklahoma	Myriad Convention Center
Tulsa Oilers	Tulsa, Oklahoma	Maxwell Convention Center
Wichita Thunder	Wichita, Kansas	Britt Brown Arena

== Map of teams ==
Central Hockey League teams

== Regular season ==
=== League standings ===
Central Hockey League	GP	W	L	T	GF	GA	Pts
y-Oklahoma City Blazers	60	39	18	3	291	232	81
x-Tulsa Oilers	60	35	22	3	270	230	73
x-Dallas Freeze	60	31	25	4	276	242	66
x-Memphis RiverKings	60	26	27	7	253	272	59
e-Fort Worth Fire	60	24	29	7	252	288	55
e-Wichita Thunder	60	25	33	2	242	320	52

Note: y - clinched league title; x - clinched playoff spot; e - eliminated from playoff contention.

== Playoffs ==
=== Playoff bracket ===
Ray Miron Cup first round
1	Oklahoma City Blazers	4
4	Memphis RiverKings	2
2	Tulsa Oilers	4
3	Dallas Freeze	3

Ray Miron Cup Finals
2	Tulsa Oilers	4
1	Oklahoma City Blazers	1

== CHL awards ==
Ray Miron Cup:	Tulsa Oilers
Adams Cup:	Oklahoma City Blazers
Coach of the Year:	Garry Unger (Tulsa)
Most Valuable Player:	Sylvain Fleury (Oklahoma City)
Playoff Most Valuable Player:	Tony Fiore (Tulsa)
Most Outstanding Goaltender:	Tony Martino (Tulsa)
Most Outstanding Defenseman	Dave Doucette (Dallas)
Rookie of the Year	Robert Desjardins (Wichita)
Scoring Champion	Sylvain Fleury (Oklahoma City)

== Player statistics ==
=== Scoring leaders ===
Note: GP = Games played; G = Goals; A = Assists; Pts = Points; PIM = Penalty minutes

Player	Team	GP	G	A	Pts	PIM
Sylvain Fleury	Oklahoma City Blazers	59	48	53	101	24
Doug Lawrence	Tulsa Oilers	57	22	73	95	161
Sylvain Naud	Tulsa Oilers	58	39	48	87	114
Tom Mutch	Memphis RiverKings	59	43	38	81	100
Taylor Hall	Tulsa Oilers	58	35	45	80	64
Ken Thibodeau	Wichita Thunder	54	40	35	75	87
Wayne Anchikoski	Dallas Freeze	57	35	37	72	74
Carl Boudreau	Oklahoma City Blazers	48	27	44	71	109
Daniel Larin	Oklahoma City Blazers	48	43	27	70	188
Jason Taylor	Dallas Freeze	60	38	32	70	210
