= Dave Chyzowski =

Canadian ice hockey player (born 1971)

- Born: July 11, 1971 (age 55) Edmonton, Alberta, Canada
- Height: 6 ft 1 in (185 cm)
- Weight: 200 lb (91 kg; 14 st 4 lb)
- Position: Left wing
- Shot: Left
- Played for: New York Islanders; Chicago Blackhawks
- NHL draft: 2nd overall, 1989; New York Islanders
- Playing career: 1989–2007

David B. Chyzowski (born July 11, 1971) is a Canadian former professional ice hockey left winger. He was selected second overall in the 1989 NHL entry draft by the New York Islanders after playing major junior with the Kamloops Blazers. He spent parts of six seasons in the National Hockey League with the Islanders and Chicago Blackhawks between 1989 and 1997, with the rest of his career spent in various minor leagues and in Europe.

== Playing career ==
Chyzowski is generally recognized as a draft bust as he only played 126 NHL games between 1989 and 1995, scoring 31 points. He was chosen ahead of fellow first-round picks Bill Guerin, Stu Barnes, and Bobby Holik. Chyzowski spent his career with the Islanders and Chicago Blackhawks. While Chyzowski did not have an impact at the NHL level, he did carve out a nice career in the minor leagues, particularly the AHL and IHL. His best minor league season was 1995–96, when he had 83 points on 44 goals and 39 assists, along with 160 penalty minutes, for Adirondack Red Wings.

== Post-hockey career ==
In 2006, he was playing for Linz EHC in the Austrian League. After his playing career, he took on the position of Marketing Coordinator for the Kamloops Blazers Hockey Club, before taking on a similar position with the Merritt Centennials.

== Career statistics ==
=== Regular season and playoffs ===
			Regular season					Playoffs
Season	Team	League	GP	G	A	Pts	PIM	GP	G	A	Pts	PIM
1986–87	St. Albert Saints	AJHL	49	22	30	52	114	—	—	—	—	—
1987–88	Kamloops Blazers	WHL	66	16	17	33	117	18	2	4	6	26
1988–89	Kamloops Blazers	WHL	68	56	48	104	139	16	15	13	28	32
1989–90	Kamloops Blazers	WHL	4	5	2	7	17	17	11	6	17	46
1989–90	Springfield Indians	AHL	4	0	0	0	7	—	—	—	—	—
1989–90	New York Islanders	NHL	34	8	6	14	45	—	—	—	—	—
1989–90	Kamloops Blazers	MC	—	—	—	—	—	3	4	3	7	13
1990–91	Capital District Islanders	AHL	7	3	6	9	22	—	—	—	—	—
1990–91	New York Islanders	NHL	56	5	9	14	61	—	—	—	—	—
1991–92	Capital District Islanders	AHL	55	15	18	33	121	6	1	1	2	23
1991–92	New York Islanders	NHL	12	1	1	2	17	—	—	—	—	—
1992–93	Capital District Islanders	AHL	66	15	21	36	177	3	2	0	2	0
1993–94	New York Islanders	NHL	3	1	0	1	4	2	0	0	0	0
1993–94	Salt Lake Golden Eagles	IHL	66	27	13	40	151	—	—	—	—	—
1994–95	Kalamazoo Wings	IHL	4	0	4	4	8	16	9	5	14	27
1994–95	New York Islanders	NHL	13	0	0	0	11	—	—	—	—	—
1995–96	Adirondack Red Wings	AHL	80	44	39	83	160	3	0	0	0	6
1996–97	Indianapolis Ice	IHL	76	34	40	74	261	4	0	2	2	38
1996–97	Chicago Blackhawks	NHL	8	0	0	0	6	—	—	—	—	—
1997–98	Orlando Solar Bears	IHL	17	9	7	16	32	—	—	—	—	—
1997–98	San Antonio Dragons	IHL	10	1	5	6	39	—	—	—	—	—
1997–98	Kansas City Blades	IHL	38	19	14	33	88	11	5	4	9	11
1998–99	Kansas City Blades	IHL	67	24	15	39	147	—	—	—	—	—
1999–2000	Kansas City Blades	IHL	81	37	33	70	138	—	—	—	—	—
2000–01	Augsburger Panther	DEL	44	11	14	25	114	—	—	—	—	—
2000–01	München Barons	DEL	15	0	3	3	24	11	3	0	3	6
2001–02	SERC Wild Wings	DEL	56	19	19	38	86	—	—	—	—	—
2002–03	SERC Wild Wings	DEL	49	12	17	29	80	—	—	—	—	—
2003–04	Graz 99ers	AUT	36	23	13	36	115	2	1	0	1	27
2004–05	Vienna Capitals	AUT	43	31	29	60	168	10	6	8	14	14
2005–06	EHC Black Wings Linz	AUT	48	25	36	61	100	—	—	—	—	—
2006–07	EHC Black Wings Linz	AUT	9	0	2	2	14	—	—	—	—	—
AHL totals			212	77	84	161	487	12	3	1	4	29
NHL totals			126	15	16	31	144	2	0	0	0	0
IHL totals			359	151	131	282	864	31	14	11	25	76

=== International ===
Dave Chyzowski
Medal record

Representing Canada

Ice hockey

World Junior Championships
Gold medal – first place	1990 Helsinki	

Year	Team	Event	GP	G	A	Pts	PIM
1990	Canada	WJC	7	9	4	13	2
Junior totals			7	9	4	13	2

== Awards ==
- WHL West First All-Star Team – 1989

Preceded by Kevin Cheveldayoff	New York Islanders first-round draft pick 1989	Succeeded by Scott Scissons
