= Ivan Droppa =

Slovak ice hockey player

- Born: 1 February 1972 (age 54) Liptovsky Mikulas, Czechoslovakia
- Height: 6 ft 3 in (191 cm)
- Weight: 216 lb (98 kg; 15 st 6 lb)
- Position: Defense
- Shot: Left
- Played for: Ours de Villard-de-Lans; MsHK Žilina; HC Košice; HK 32 Liptovský Mikuláš; HC Chemopetrol; HC Slavia Praha; Nürnberg Ice Tigers; DEG Metro Stars; Kassel Huskies; Chicago Blackhawks
- National team: Slovakia
- NHL draft: 37th overall, 1990; Chicago Blackhawks
- Playing career: 1990–2014

Ivan Droppa (born February 1, 1972) is a Slovak retired professional ice hockey defenceman who played 19 games in the National Hockey League for the Chicago Blackhawks between 1993 and 1996. He also played for Slovakia at the 1998 Winter Olympics.

== Career statistics ==
=== Regular season and playoffs ===
			Regular season					Playoffs
Season	Team	League	GP	G	A	Pts	PIM	GP	G	A	Pts	PIM
1989–90	TJ VSŽ Košice	CSSR U20	—	—	—	—	—	—	—	—	—	—
1990–91	HC VSŽ Košice	CSSR	49	1	7	8	12	5	0	0	0	0
1991–92	HC VSŽ Košice	CSSR	32	2	5	7	—	8	2	2	4	—
1992–93	Indianapolis Ice	IHL	77	14	29	43	92	5	0	1	1	2
1993–94	Chicago Blackhawks	NHL	12	0	1	1	12	—	—	—	—	—
1993–94	Indianapolis Ice	IHL	55	9	10	19	71	—	—	—	—	—
1994–95	Indianapolis Ice	IHL	67	5	28	33	91	—	—	—	—	—
1995–96	Chicago Blackhawks	NHL	7	0	0	0	2	—	—	—	—	—
1995–96	Indianapolis Ice	IHL	72	6	30	36	71	3	0	1	1	2
1996–97	Indianapolis Ice	IHL	26	1	13	14	44	—	—	—	—	—
1996–97	Carolina Monarchs	AHL	47	4	22	26	48	—	—	—	—	—
1997–98	HC Košice	SVK	23	4	14	18	14	11	2	4	6	29
1998–99	Nürnberg Ice Tigers	DEL	42	10	14	24	97	13	1	7	8	50
1999–00	Kassel Huskies	DEL	26	2	11	13	24	8	1	0	1	16
2000–01	Düsseldorfer EG	DEL	48	6	10	16	50	—	—	—	—	—
2001–02	DEG Metro Stars	DEL	59	6	16	22	81	—	—	—	—	—
2002–03	Nürnberg Ice Tigers	DEL	46	2	8	10	56	5	0	3	3	2
2003–04	HC Slavia Praha	CZE	13	1	3	4	14	—	—	—	—	—
2003–04	HC Chemopetrol	ELH	36	1	7	8	16	—	—	—	—	—
2004–05	HK 32 Liptovský Mikuláš	SVK	44	5	11	16	37	—	—	—	—	—
2004–05	MsHK Žilina	SVK	8	1	0	1	0	5	1	2	3	18
2005–06	MsHK Žilina	SVK	54	3	13	16	70	17	1	5	6	24
2006–07	HC Košice	SVK	50	9	16	25	82	11	1	5	6	20
2007–08	HC Kosiše	SVK	49	9	16	25	101	19	2	2	4	18
2008–09	MsHK Žilina a.s	SVK	44	4	11	15	74	—	—	—	—	—
2008–09	SERC Wild Wings	GER-2	9	1	3	4	8	1	0	1	1	6
2009–10	Ours de Villard-de-Lans	FRA	7	0	1	1	8	—	—	—	—	—
2009–10	MHK Dolný Kubín	SVK-2	4	1	1	2	0	—	—	—	—	—
2011–12	MHk 32 Liptovský Mikuláš B	SVK-3	12	1	5	6	4	—	—	—	—	—
2012–13	MHk 32 Liptovský Mikuláš B	SVK-3	17	5	15	20	73	—	—	—	—	—
2013–14	MHk 32 Liptovský Mikuláš B	SVK-3	12	3	10	13	32	—	—	—	—	—
2013–14	HKm Humenné	SVK-3	16	4	11	15	34	—	—	—	—	—
SVK totals			272	35	81	116	378	63	7	18	25	109
NHL totals			19	0	1	1	14	—	—	—	—	—

=== International ===
Year	Team	Event	GP	G	A	Pts	PIM
1990	Czechoslovakia	EJC	6	4	2	6	2
1991	Czechoslovakia	WJC	5	0	1	1	4
1992	Czechoslovakia	WJC	6	0	3	3	6
1996	Slovakia	WCH	3	0	1	1	2
1997	Slovakia	WC	8	0	2	2	6
1998	Slovakia	OLY	4	0	0	0	4
1998	Slovakia	WC	6	0	0	0	8
1999	Slovakia	WC	4	1	1	2	4
2000	Slovakia	WC	9	0	1	1	0
2001	Slovakia	WC	7	1	1	2	16
Junior totals			17	4	6	10	12
Senior totals			41	2	6	8	40
