= Milan Nedoma =

Czech ice hockey player

- Born: 29 March 1972 (age 53) Brno, Czechoslovakia
- Height: 6 ft 0 in (183 cm)
- Weight: 201 lb (91 kg; 14 st 5 lb)
- Position: Defense
- Shot: Left
- Played for: HC Kometa Brno; Mountfield HK; HK Dukla Trencin; HC Sparta Praha; HC Ceske Budejovice; HC Vsetin; HC Lasselsberger Plzen; BK Mlada Boleslav
- National team: Czech Republic
- NHL draft: 166th overall, 1990; Buffalo Sabres
- Playing career: 1988–2007

Milan Nedoma is a Czech former ice hockey defenseman.

Nedoma played a total of 19 seasons of hockey most of which in the Czech Extraliga. He was selected in the 8th round, 166th overall in the 1990 NHL Draft by the Buffalo Sabres.

== Coaching career ==
Nedoma served as head coach for the Czech club Hluboka nad Vltavou Knights for 7 seasons starting in the 2009–10 season before being recalled during the 2015–16 season on 18 November. He was replaced by Miroslav Sulista.

== Career statistics ==
			Regular season					Playoffs
Season	Team	League	GP	G	A	Pts	PIM	GP	G	A	Pts	PIM
1988–89	TJ Zetor Brno	Czech2	2	0	1	1	2	—	—	—	—	—
1989–90	TJ Zetor Brno	Czech	35	1	4	5	34	—	—	—	—	—
1990–91	HC Zetor Brno	Czech2	40	6	16	22	32	—	—	—	—	—
1991–92	HK Dukla Trenčín	Czech	34	2	4	6	—	13	2	1	3	—
1992–93	HK Dukla Trenčín	Czech	43	10	17	27	—	—	—	—	—	—
1992–93	HC Královopolská Brno	Czech2	3	0	0	0	4	—	—	—	—	—
1993–94	HC Stadion Hradec Králové	Czech	36	10	7	17	36	—	—	—	—	—
1993–94	HC Královopolská Brno	Czech2	6	4	5	9	8	6	1	2	3	2
1994–95	HC Ceske Budejovice	Czech	29	5	5	10	16	—	—	—	—	—
1995–96	HC Ceske Budejovice	Czech	40	6	4	10	26	10	0	4	4	2
1996–97	HC Ceske Budejovice	Czech	49	10	19	29	30	5	0	2	2	4
1997–98	HC Ceske Budejovice	Czech	52	9	27	36	40	—	—	—	—	—
1998–99	HC Ceske Budejovice	Czech	50	9	18	27	50	2	0	0	0	2
1999–00	HC Ceske Budejovice	Czech	51	10	12	22	42	3	1	0	1	16
2000–01	HC Vsetin	Czech	37	2	10	12	30	14	1	3	4	10
2001–02	HC Ceske Budejovice	Czech	45	4	9	13	56	—	—	—	—	—
2002–03	HC Ceske Budejovice	Czech	24	2	6	8	4	—	—	—	—	—
2002–03	HC Sparta Praha	Czech	17	1	3	4	6	3	0	0	0	2
2003–04	HC Lasselsberger Plzen	Czech	39	3	9	12	39	7	1	0	1	2
2004–05	HC Lasselsberger Plzen	Czech	29	1	5	6	24	—	—	—	—	—
2005–06	HC Lasselsberger Plzen	Czech	44	1	5	6	56	—	—	—	—	—
2006–07	HC Lasselsberger Plzen	Czech	31	1	2	3	34	—	—	—	—	—
2006–07	BK Mlada Boleslav	Czech2	11	1	3	4	33	8	0	1	1	2
Czech totals			685	87	166	253	523	67	5	10	15	46
