= Toni Porkka =

Finnish ice hockey player

- Born: February 4, 1970 (age 56) Rauma, Finland
- Height: 6 ft 2 in (188 cm)
- Weight: 198 lb (90 kg; 14 st 2 lb)
- Position: Defense
- Shot: Right
- Played for: Lukko; Hershey Bears; Frankfurt Lions; Kölner Haie
- National team: Finland
- NHL draft: 172nd overall, 1990; Philadelphia Flyers
- Playing career: 1988–2006

Toni Porkka (born February 4, 1970) is a Finnish former professional ice hockey player who played in the Finnish SM-liiga, German Deutsche Eishockey Liga (DEL), and the American Hockey League (AHL). He was drafted in the ninth round of the 1990 NHL entry draft by the Philadelphia Flyers and played three seasons with the Flyers top minor league affiliate at the time, the AHL's Hershey Bears. He spent most of his professional career in Europe, playing nine seasons in the SM-liiga with Rauman Lukko and six seasons in the DEL with the Frankfurt Lions and Kölner Haie. He is currently the Hockey Director for the Valley Forge Minutemen of the Atlantic Youth Hockey League.

== Career statistics ==
			Regular season					Playoffs
Season	Team	League	GP	G	A	Pts	PIM	GP	G	A	Pts	PIM
1988–89	Lukko	Liiga	44	2	2	4	18	—	—	—	—	—
1989–90	Lukko	Liiga	41	0	3	3	18	—	—	—	—	—
1990–91	Lukko	Liiga	34	2	2	4	8	—	—	—	—	—
1991–92	Hershey Bears	AHL	63	3	5	8	34	—	—	—	—	—
1992–93	Hershey Bears	AHL	49	6	13	19	22	—	—	—	—	—
1993–94	Hershey Bears	AHL	51	6	7	13	43	10	0	1	1	8
1994–95	Lukko	Liiga	47	1	9	10	103	8	0	1	1	6
1995–96	Lukko	Liiga	50	8	12	20	69	8	0	1	1	6
1996–97	Frankfurt Lions	DEL	48	8	15	23	66	9	0	4	4	10
1998–99	Frankfurt Lions	DEL	44	6	9	15	52	7	0	0	0	12
1998–99	Frankfurt Lions	DEL	51	3	4	7	60	8	1	1	2	4
1999–00	Frankfurt Lions	DEL	55	2	20	22	100	4	1	1	2	0
2000–01	Frankfurt Lions	DEL	60	2	7	9	76	—	—	—	—	—
2001–02	Kölner Haie	DEL	55	5	12	17	99	13	2	1	3	22
2002–03	Lukko	Liiga	44	5	12	17	79	—	—	—	—	—
2003–04	Lukko	Liiga	48	5	13	18	48	4	1	0	1	6
2004–05	Lukko	Liiga	52	8	9	17	107	8	0	0	0	10
2005–06	Lukko	Liiga	3	0	0	0	4	—	—	—	—	—
AHL totals			163	15	25	40	99	10	0	1	1	8
DEL totals			313	26	67	93	453	41	4	7	11	48
Liiga totals			363	31	62	93	454	28	1	3	4	32
