= Mika Välilä =

Ice hockey player

- Born: February 28, 1970 (age 56) Södertälje, Sweden
- Height: 5 ft 10 in (178 cm)
- Weight: 195 lb (88 kg; 13 st 13 lb)
- Position: Center
- Shot: Left
- Played for: Bodens IK; Borås HC; Diskos Jyväskylä; IF Troja/Ljungby; Jokerit Helsinki; Lukko Rauma; Tappara Tampere; Vantaa HT
- NHL draft: 130th overall, 1990; Pittsburgh Penguins
- Playing career: 1989–2005

Mika Välilä (born February 28, 1970) is a retired Swedish-born Finnish professional ice hockey player. Välilä was drafted by the Pittsburgh Penguins of the National Hockey League, selected 130th overall in the 1990 NHL entry draft.

Välilä also holds the distinction of scoring the overtime winner in the longest game in Swedish hockey history, scoring in the fifth overtime vs Bofors IK on March 20, 2002.

== Career statistics ==
			Regular season					Playoffs
Season	Team	League	GP	G	A	Pts	PIM	GP	G	A	Pts	PIM
1988–89	Tappara U20	Jr. A SM-sarja	11	8	11	19	6	4	2	3	5	2
1988–89	Tappara	Liiga	14	2	5	7	8	3	1	0	1	2
1989–90	Tappara	Liiga	44	8	16	24	16	7	2	2	4	4
1990–91	Tappara	Liiga	41	10	9	19	16	3	0	1	1	0
1991–92	Jokerit	Liiga	30	4	3	7	4	8	1	1	2	2
1991–92	Vantaa HT	I-Divisioona	3	3	1	4	2	—	—	—	—	—
1992–93	Lukko	Liiga	48	8	10	18	24	3	0	0	0	0
1993–94	Lukko	Liiga	45	7	7	14	18	9	0	0	0	8
1994–95	IF Troja/Ljungby	Division 1	35	14	17	31	54	7	3	2	5	10
1995–96	IF Troja/Ljungby	Division 1	29	4	6	10	36	10	3	4	7	8
1996–97	Bodens IK	Division 1	19	6	8	14	47	—	—	—	—	—
1997–98	Borås HC	Division 2	31	10	12	22	—	—	—	—	—	—
1999–00	Diskos	I-Divisioona	46	12	24	36	12	6	2	3	5	4
2000–01	Diskos	Mestis	18	3	5	8	14	3	0	1	1	2
2001–02	IF Troja/Ljungby	Allsvenskan	36	7	10	17	26	—	—	—	—	—
2002–03	IF Troja/Ljungby	Allsvenskan	36	8	12	20	30	9	5	4	9	0
2003–04	IF Troja/Ljungby	Allsvenskan	46	8	15	23	65	10	3	1	4	8
2004–05	IF Troja/Ljungby	Allsvenskan	28	4	3	7	14	7	0	0	0	10
Liiga totals			222	39	50	89	86	33	4	4	8	16

== Awards and accomplishments ==
- 1987-1988, U18 EJC Silver Medal
- 1989-1990, SM-liiga All-Rookie Team
- 1990, World Junior Championship, Best Player of Team Finland
- 1991-1992, SM-liiga Champion
- 1993-1994, SM-liiga Bronze Medal
