= 1990 NHL entry draft =

1990 North American ice hockey draft

General information
- Date: June 16, 1990
- Location: BC Place; Vancouver, British Columbia, Canada

Overview
- 252 total selections in 12 rounds
- First selection: (Canada) Owen Nolan (Quebec Nordiques)
- Hall of Famers: 3: LW Keith Tkachuk; G Martin Brodeur; D Sergei Zubov

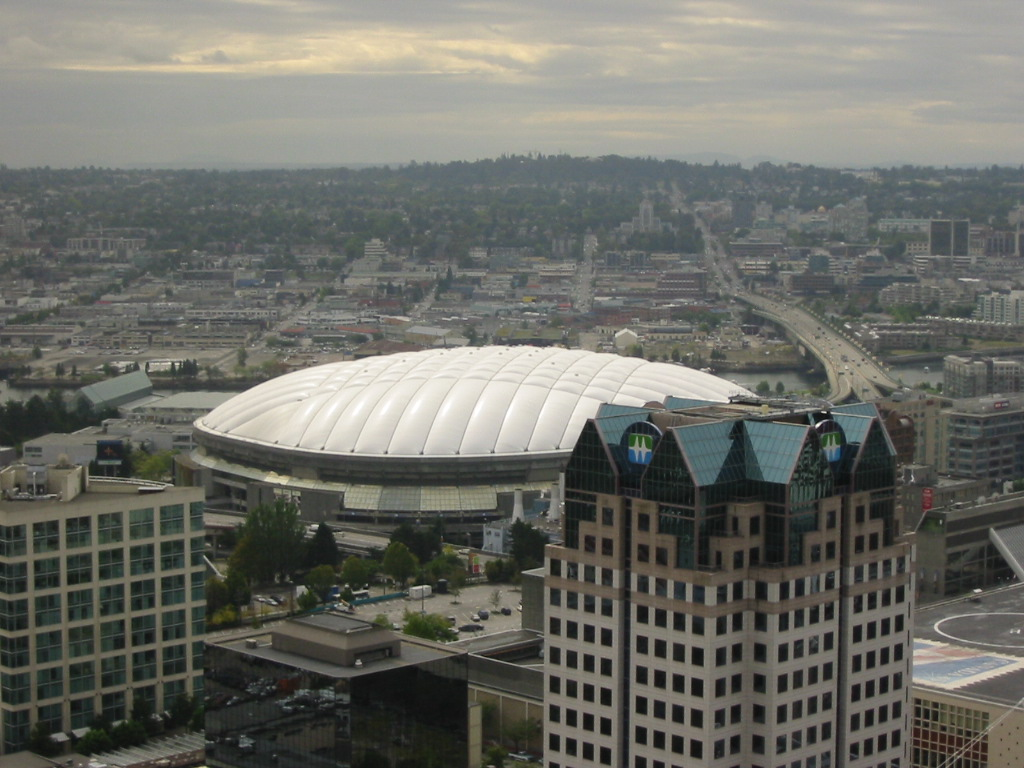
BC Place was the venue for the 1990 NHL entry draft

The 1990 NHL entry draft was the 28th draft for the National Hockey League. It was hosted by the Vancouver Canucks at BC Place in Vancouver on June 16, 1990. It is remembered as one of the deeper drafts in NHL history, with fourteen of the twenty-one first round picks going on to careers of at least 500 NHL games.

Nine of the twenty-one players drafted in the first round played 1,000 NHL games in their career.

The last active player in the NHL from this draft class was Jaromir Jagr, who played his last NHL game in the 2017–18 season. As of 2026, Jagr is still an active player with Rytíři Kladno of the Czech Extraliga.

== Venue ==
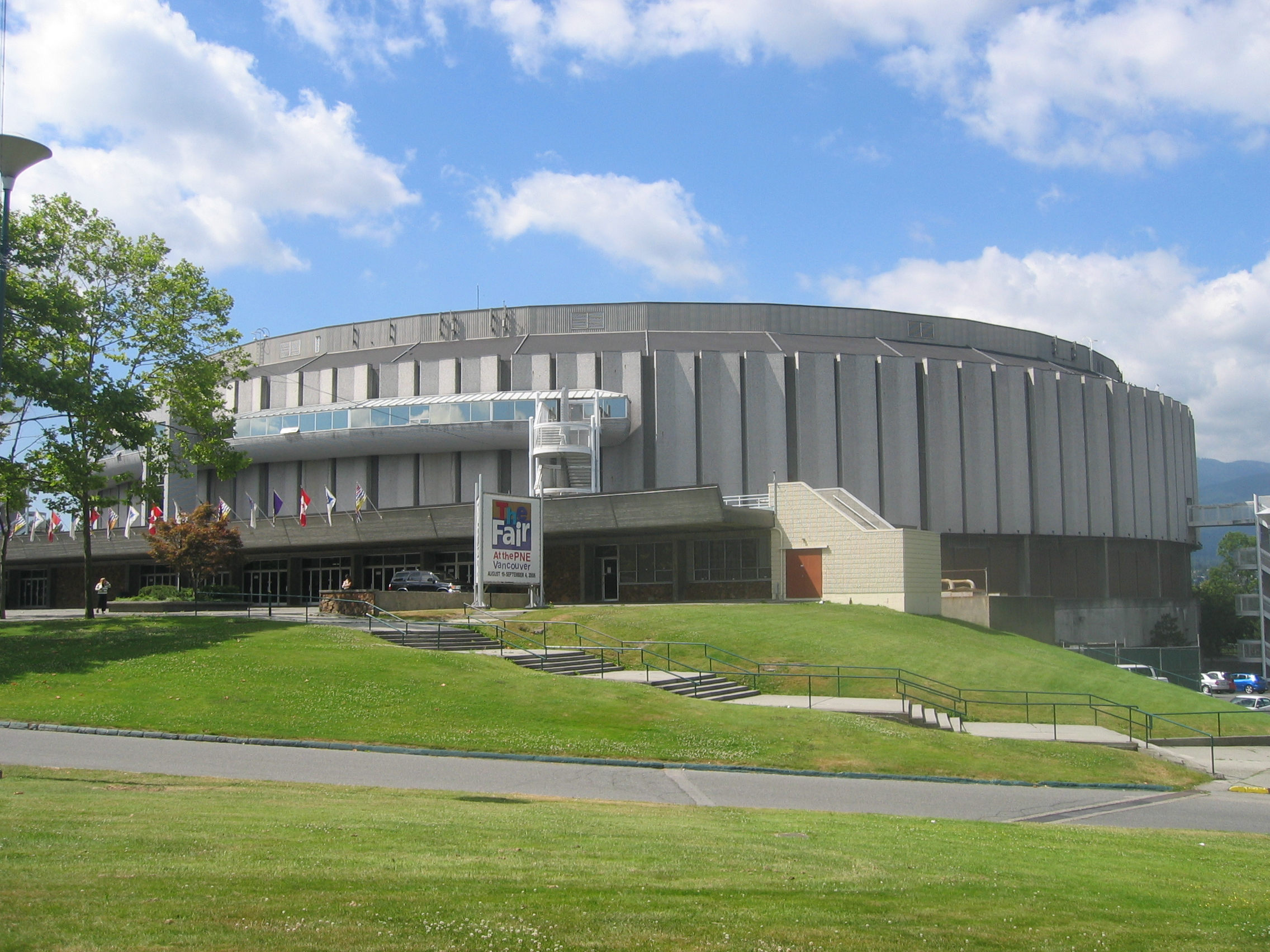
The Pacific Coliseum was the originally intended venue for the Draft

The 1990 NHL entry draft was originally scheduled to be held at the Pacific Coliseum, the home arena of the host Vancouver Canucks located on the site of the Pacific National Exhibition (PNE). However, the Canadian Union of Public Employees union representing the PNE employees—CUPE Local 1004—threatened to strike June 15, one day before the draft. Consequently, the NHL and the Canucks decided to move the draft to BC Place in order to avoid the potential strike and issues of public access to the venue. In addition to BC Place, the University of British Columbia, the Vancouver Convention Centre and the Hyatt Regency Vancouver were also considered as replacement venues.

The Canucks had estimated that 10,000 spectators would attend the draft, which had free admission. However, holding the venue in a higher capacity venue allowed for that estimate to nearly double, with 19,127 spectators—a then record for attendance at an NHL entry draft—attending the draft.

== Top prospects ==
Heading into the 1990 NHL entry draft, Mike Ricci had spent the entire 1989–90 season ranked as the top prospect by the NHL Central Scouting Bureau. Before the release of the final rankings of North American skaters and goaltenders, it was speculated Owen Nolan, Keith Primeau and Petr Nedved would surpass Ricci; however, when the final rankings were released, Ricci remained as the top prospect. Jaromir Jagr was also considered to be one of the top prospects, but Central Scouting did not rank European players. Petr Nedved was an exception to that, as he played in North America after he defected his native Czechoslovakia.

Source: NHL Central Scouting

Ranking	North American skaters	European skaters
1	(Canada) Mike Ricci (C)	(Czechoslovakia) Jaromir Jagr (RW)
2	(Canada) Owen Nolan (RW)	(Soviet Union) Vyacheslav Kozlov (LW)
3	(Canada) Keith Primeau (C)	(Soviet Union) Alexander Godynyuk (D)
4	(Czechoslovakia) Petr Nedved (C)	(Soviet Union) Sergei Zubov (D)
5	(Canada) Scott Scissons (C)	
6	(Canada) Darryl Sydor (D)	(Czechoslovakia) Ivan Droppa (D)
7	(Canada) John Slaney (D)	(Sweden) Mattias Olsson (D)
8	(Canada) Ryan Hughes (C)	(Finland) Mika Valila (C)
9	(Canada) Karl Dykhuis (D)	(Czechoslovakia) Roman Meluzin (RW)
10	(United States) Derian Hatcher (D)	(Finland) Juha Ylonen (C)

Ranking	North American goalies
1	(Canada) Trevor Kidd
2	(Canada) Felix Potvin
3	(Canada) Martin Brodeur

== Selections by round ==
=== Round one ===
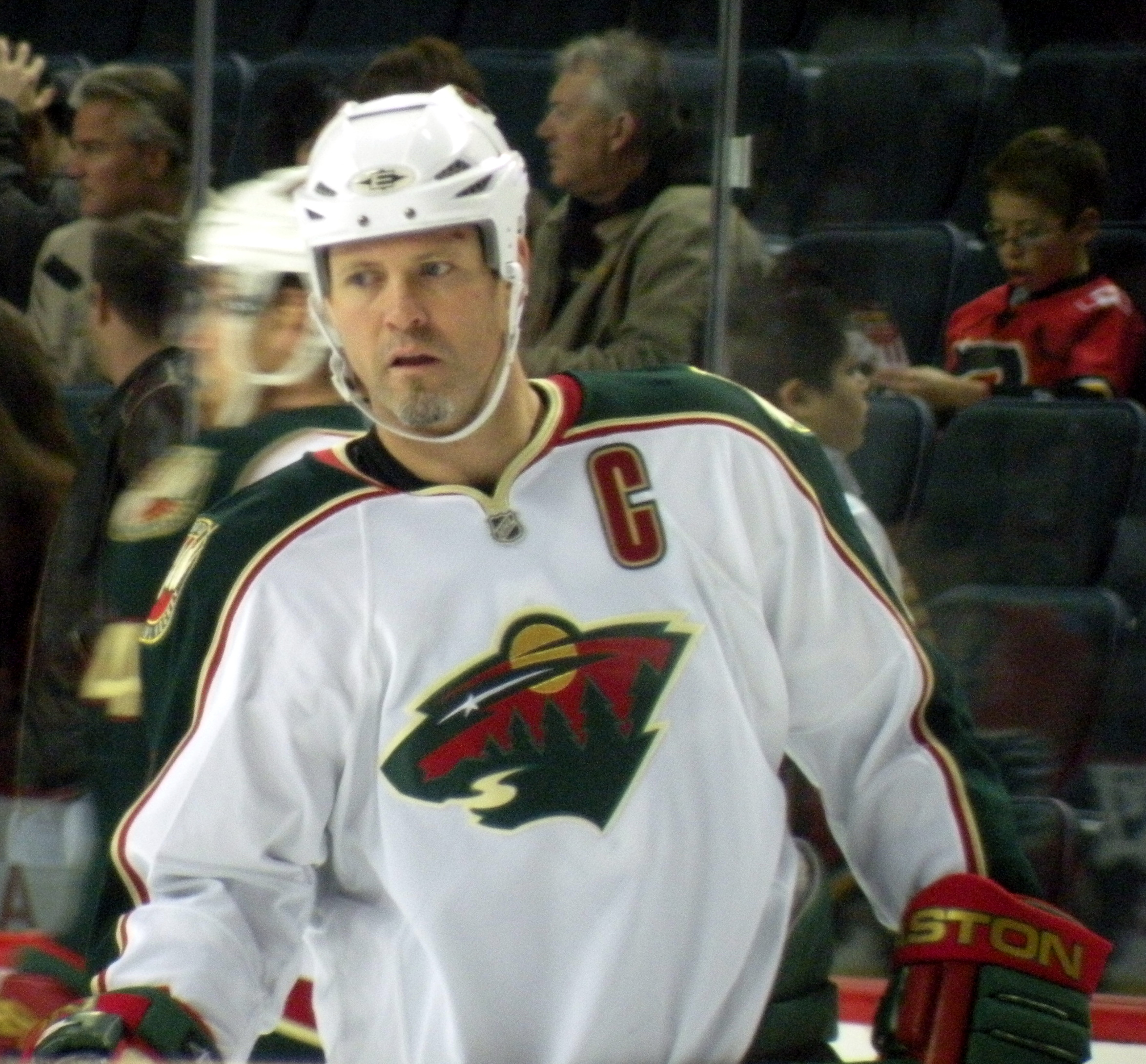
Owen Nolan was selected first overall by the Quebec Nordiques.

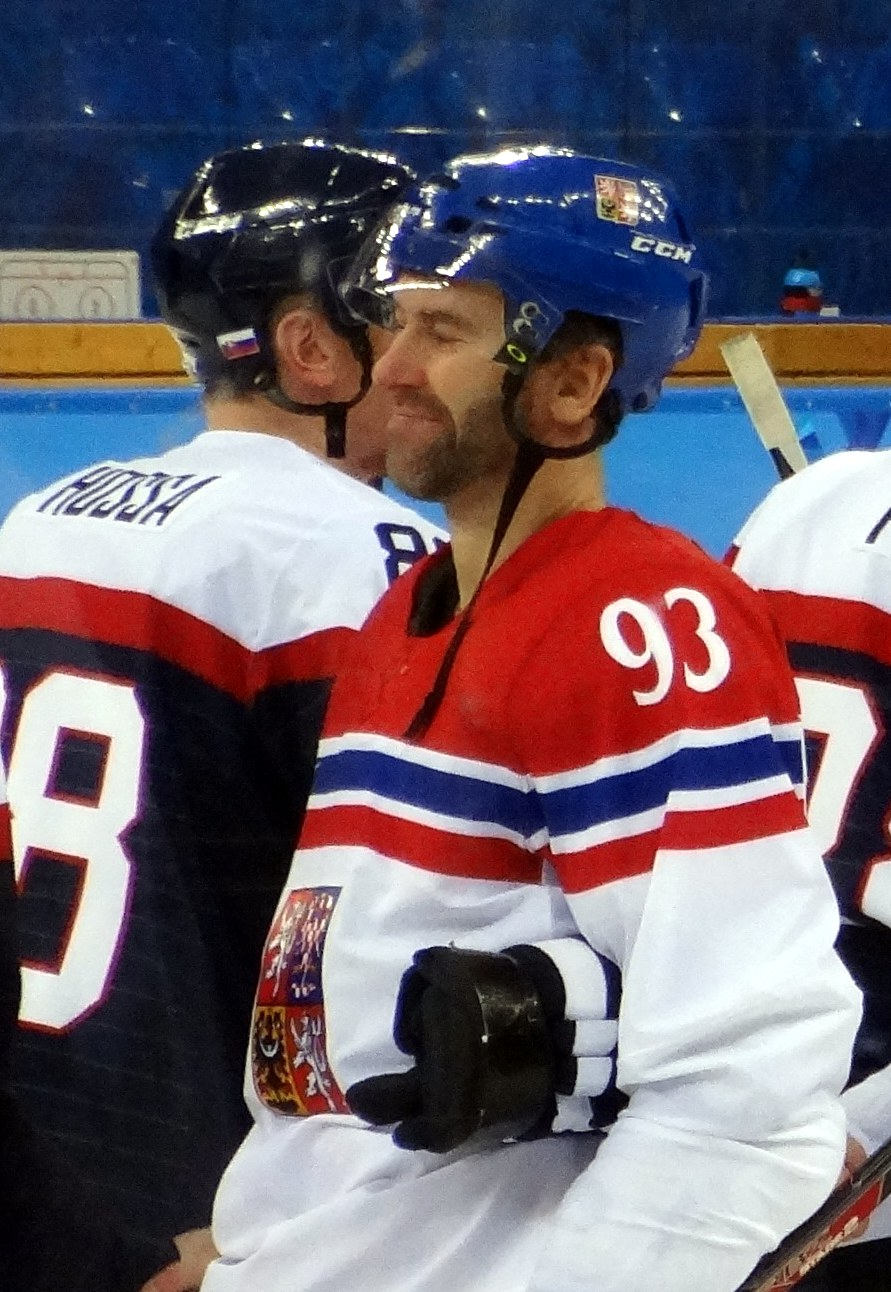
Petr Nedved was selected second overall by the Vancouver Canucks.

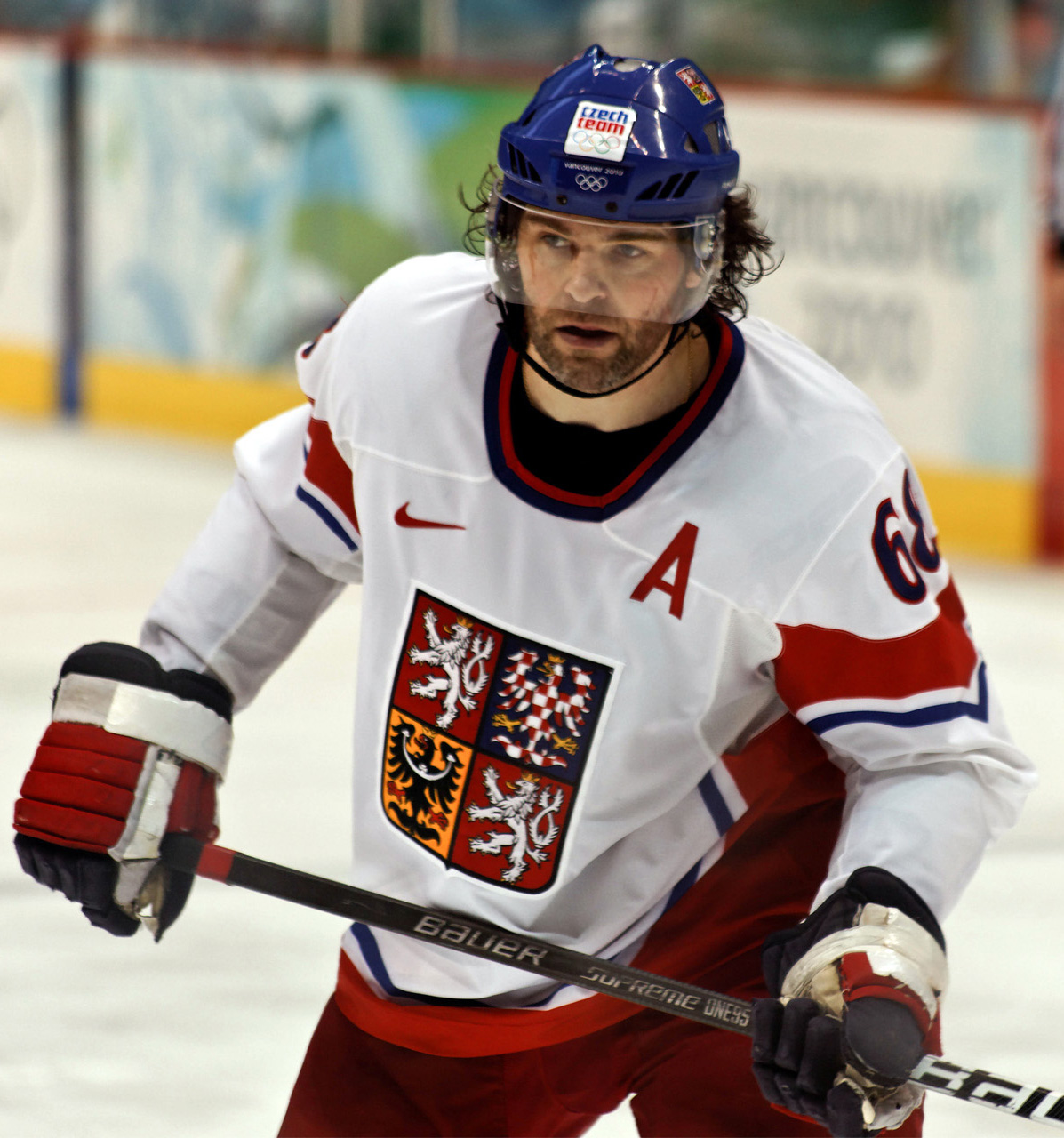
Jaromir Jagr was the top-ranked European skater by the NHL Central Scouting

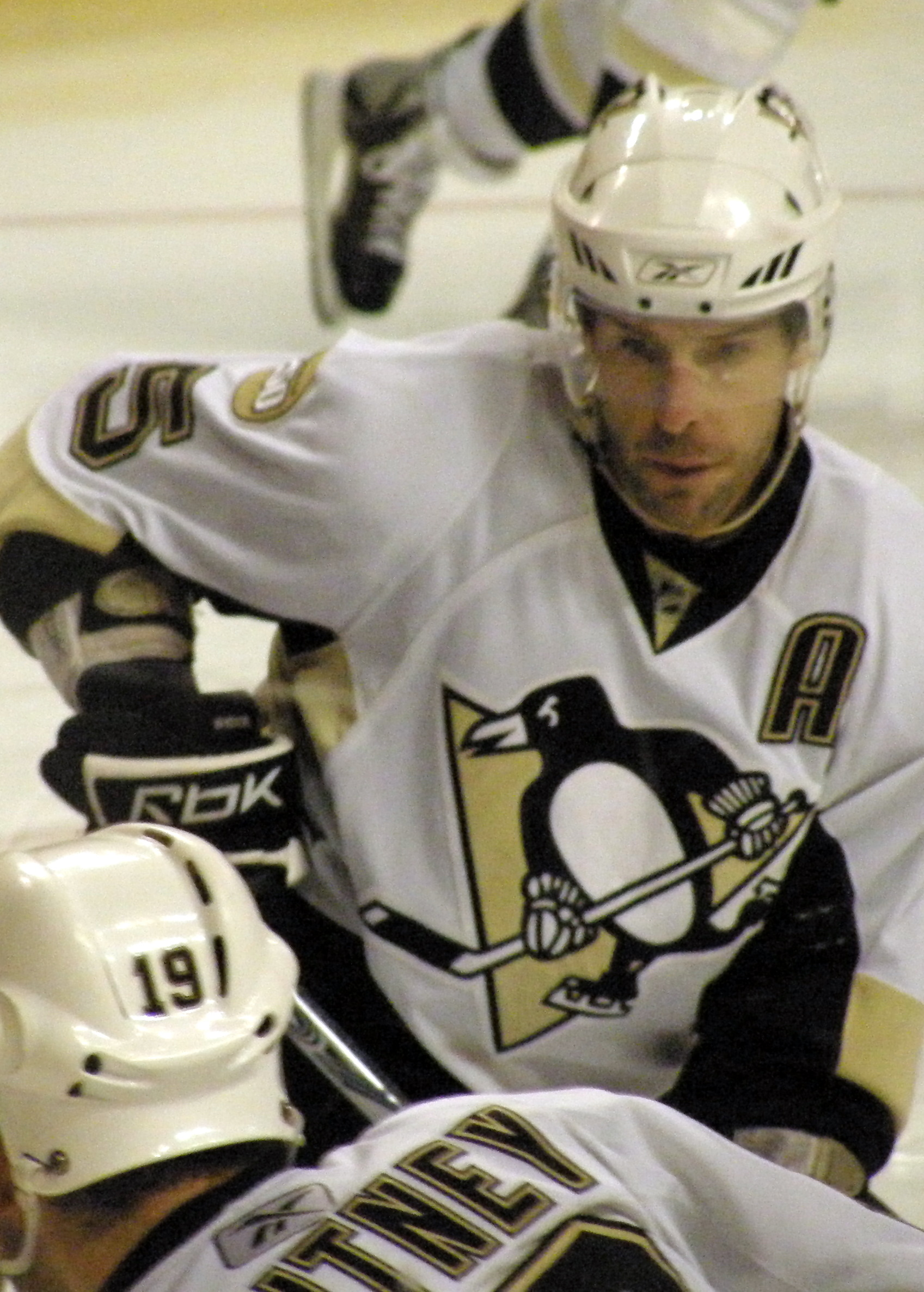
Darryl Sydor was selected seventh overall by the Los Angeles Kings.

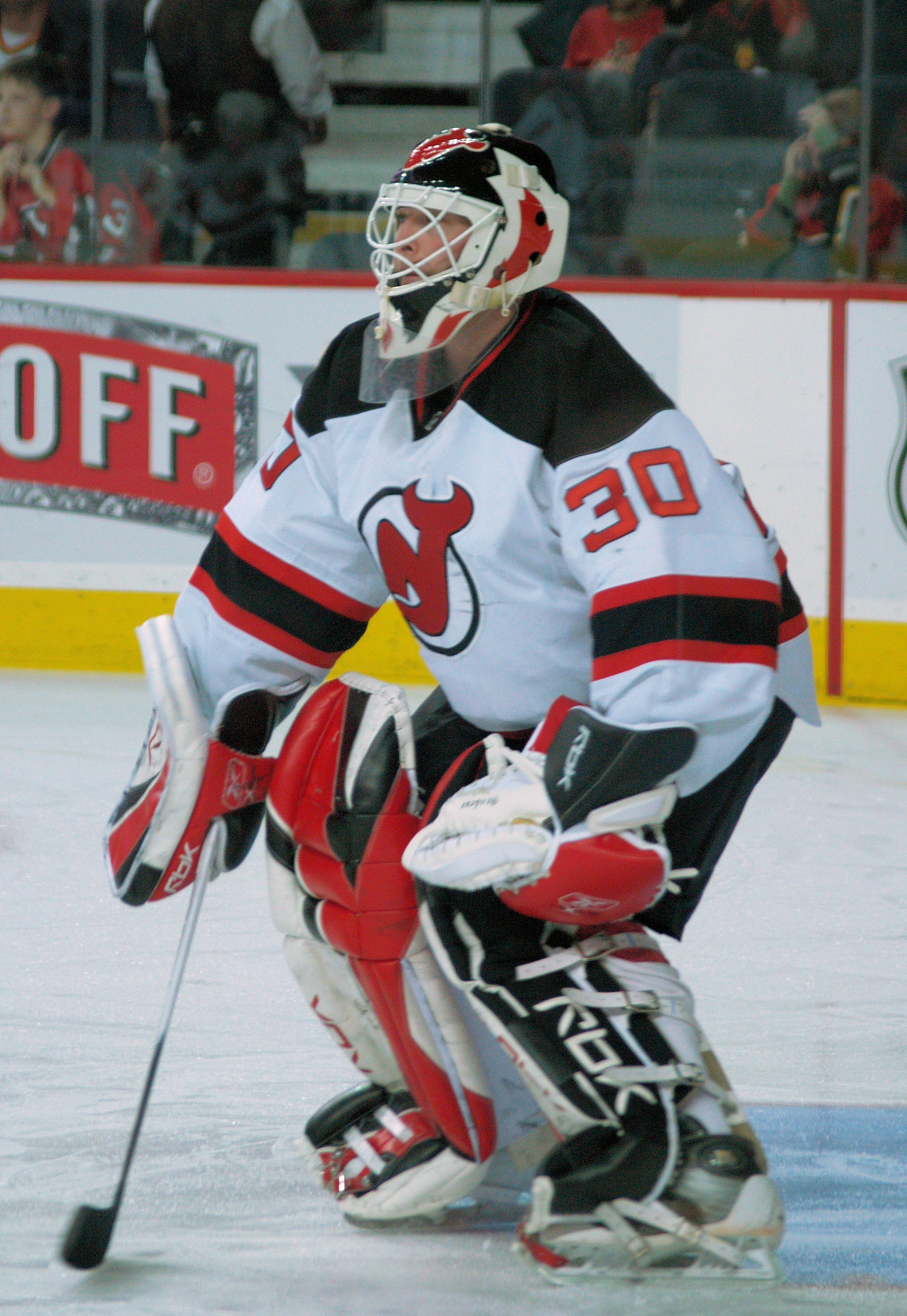
Martin Brodeur headed into the 1990 NHL Entry Draft as the third-ranked goaltender

= NHL All-Star team ·	= NHL All-Star (Note: Players are identified as an All-Star if they were selected for the All-Star game at any time in their career.) ·	= NHL All-Star and NHL All-Star team ·	= Hall of Famers

#	Player	Nationality	NHL team	College/junior/club team
1	Owen Nolan (RW)	Canada^{1}	Quebec Nordiques	Cornwall Royals (OHL)
2	Petr Nedved (C)	Czechoslovakia^{2}	Vancouver Canucks	Seattle Thunderbirds (WHL)
3	Keith Primeau (C)	Canada	Detroit Red Wings	Niagara Falls Thunder (OHL)
4	Mike Ricci (C)	Canada	Philadelphia Flyers	Peterborough Petes (OHL)
5	Jaromir Jagr (RW)	Czechoslovakia	Pittsburgh Penguins	Poldi SONP Kladno (Czechoslovakia)
6	Scott Scissons (C)	Canada	New York Islanders	Saskatoon Blades (WHL)
7	Darryl Sydor (D)	Canada	Los Angeles Kings	Kamloops Blazers (WHL)
8	Derian Hatcher (D)	United States	Minnesota North Stars	North Bay Centennials (OHL)
9	John Slaney (D)	Canada	Washington Capitals	Cornwall Royals (OHL)
10	Drake Berehowsky (D)	Canada	Toronto Maple Leafs	Kingston Frontenacs (OHL)
11	Trevor Kidd (G)	Canada	Calgary Flames ^{(from New Jersey)} ^{3}	Brandon Wheat Kings (WHL)
12	Turner Stevenson (RW)	Canada	Montreal Canadiens ^{(from St. Louis)} ^{4}	Seattle Thunderbirds (WHL)
13	Michael Stewart (D)	Canada	New York Rangers	Michigan State University (CCHA)
14	Brad May (LW)	Canada	Buffalo Sabres ^{(from Winnipeg)} ^{5}	Niagara Falls Thunder (OHL)
15	Mark Greig (RW)	Canada	Hartford Whalers	Lethbridge Hurricanes (WHL)
16	Karl Dykhuis (D)	Canada	Chicago Blackhawks	Hull Olympiques (QMJHL)
17	Scott Allison (C)	Canada	Edmonton Oilers	Prince Albert Raiders (WHL)
18	Shawn Antoski (LW)	Canada	Vancouver Canucks ^{(from Montreal via St. Louis)} ^{4}^{6}	North Bay Centennials (OHL)
19	Keith Tkachuk (LW)	United States	Winnipeg Jets ^{(from Buffalo)} ^{5}	Malden Catholic High School (USHS–MA)
20	Martin Brodeur (G)	Canada	New Jersey Devils ^{(from Calgary)} ^{3}	Saint-Hyacinthe Laser (QMJHL)
21	Bryan Smolinski (C)	United States	Boston Bruins	Michigan State University (CCHA)

=== Round two ===
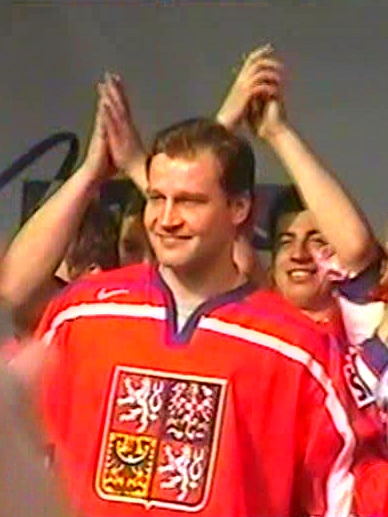
The second pick of round two, 23rd overall, Jiri Slegr was the third pick made by the Vancouver Canucks.

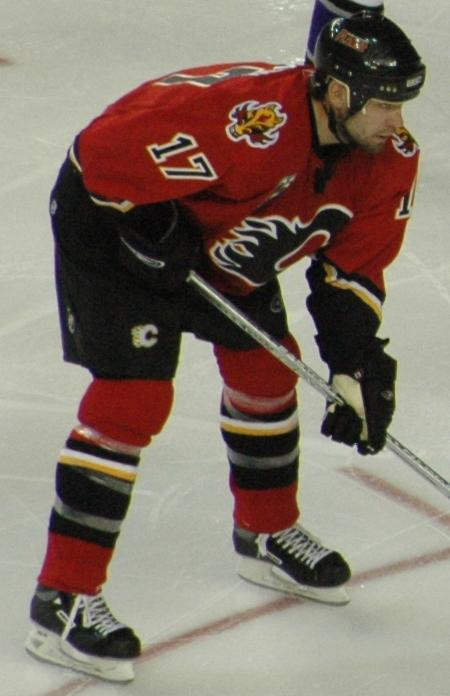
Chris Simon was chosen 25th overall by the Philadelphia Flyers, the fourth selection of round two.

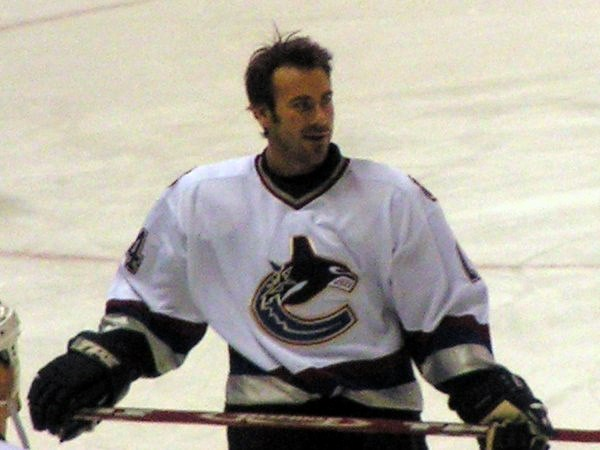
Geoff Sanderson was the 36th selection, drafted by the Hartford Whalers.

#	Player	Nationality	NHL team	College/junior/club team
22	Ryan Hughes (C)	Canada	Quebec Nordiques	Cornell University (ECAC)
23	Jiri Slegr (D)	Czechoslovakia	Vancouver Canucks	HC CHZ Litvinov (Czechoslovakia)
24	David Harlock (D)	Canada	New Jersey Devils ^{(from Detroit via Calgary)} ^{3}^{,} ^{7}	University of Michigan (CCHA)
25	Chris Simon (LW)	Canada	Philadelphia Flyers	Ottawa 67's (OHL)
26	Nicolas Perreault (D)	Canada	Calgary Flames ^{(from Pittsburgh)} ^{8}	Hawkesbury Hawks (CJHL)
27	Chris Taylor (C)	Canada	New York Islanders	London Knights (OHL)
28	Brandy Semchuk (RW)	Canada	Los Angeles Kings	Canadian National Team (International)
29	Chris Gotziaman (RW)	United States	New Jersey Devils ^{(from Minnesota via Calgary)} ^{3}^{,} ^{9}	Roseau High School (USHS–MN)
30	Rod Pasma (D)	Canada	Washington Capitals	Cornwall Royals (OHL)
31	Felix Potvin (G)	Canada	Toronto Maple Leafs	Chicoutimi Sagueneens (QMJHL)
32	Vesa Viitakoski (LW)	Finland	Calgary Flames ^{(from New Jersey)} ^{3}	SaiPa (Finland)
33	Craig Johnson (C)	United States	St. Louis Blues ^{(from St. Louis via Vancouver)} ^{6}^{,} ^{10}	Hill-Murray School (USHS–MN)
34	Doug Weight (C)	United States	New York Rangers	Lake Superior State University (CCHA)
35	Mike Muller (D)	United States	Winnipeg Jets	Wayzata High School (USHS–MN)
36	Geoff Sanderson (C)	Canada	Hartford Whalers	Swift Current Broncos (WHL)
37	Ivan Droppa (D)	Czechoslovakia	Chicago Blackhawks	MHk 32 Liptovsky Mikulas (Czechoslovakia)
38	Alexandre Legault (RW)	Canada	Edmonton Oilers	Boston University (Hockey East)
39	Ryan Kuwabara (RW)	Canada	Montreal Canadiens	Ottawa 67's (OHL)
40	Mikael Renberg (LW)	Sweden	Philadelphia Flyers ^{(from Buffalo)} ^{11}	Lulea HF (Sweden)
41	Etienne Belzile (D)	Canada	Calgary Flames	Cornell University (ECAC)
42	Terran Sandwith (D)	Canada	Philadelphia Flyers ^{(from Boston)} ^{12}	Tri-City Americans (WHL)
^{Reference:}

=== Round three ===
#	Player	Nationality	NHL team	College/junior/club team
43	Brad Zavisha (LW)	Canada	Quebec Nordiques	Seattle Thunderbirds (WHL)
44	Kimbi Daniels (C)	Canada	Philadelphia Flyers ^{(from Vancouver)} ^{13}	Swift Current Broncos (WHL)
45	Vyacheslav Kozlov (C)	Soviet Union	Detroit Red Wings	Khimik Voskresensk (USSR)
46	Bill Armstrong (D)	Canada	Philadelphia Flyers	Oshawa Generals (OHL)
47	Chris Therien (D)	Canada	Philadelphia Flyers ^{(from Pittsburgh)} ^{14}	Northwood School (USHS–NY)
48	Dan Plante (RW)	United States	New York Islanders	Edina High School (USHS–MN)
49	Bob Berg (LW)	Canada	Los Angeles Kings	Belleville Bulls (OHL)
50	Laurie Billeck (D)	Canada	Minnesota North Stars	Prince Albert Raiders (WHL)
51	Chris Longo (RW)	Canada	Washington Capitals	Peterborough Petes (OHL)
52	Al Kinisky (LW)	Canada	Philadelphia Flyers ^{(from Toronto)} ^{15}	Seattle Thunderbirds (WHL)
53	Mike Dunham (G)	United States	New Jersey Devils	Canterbury School (USHS–CT)
54	Patrice Tardif (C)	Canada	St. Louis Blues	Champlain College Lennoxville (CEGEP)
55	John Vary (D)	Canada	New York Rangers	North Bay Centennials (OHL)
56	Brad Bombardir (D)	Canada	New Jersey Devils ^{(from Winnipeg)} ^{16}	Powell River Kings (BCJHL)
57	Mike Lenarduzzi (G)	Canada	Hartford Whalers	Sault Ste. Marie Greyhounds (OHL)
58	Charles Poulin (C)	Canada	Montreal Canadiens ^{(from Chicago)} ^{17}	Saint-Hyacinthe Laser (QMJHL)
59	Joe Crowley (LW)	United States	Edmonton Oilers	Lawrence Academy (USHS–MA)
60	Robert Guillet (RW)	Canada	Montreal Canadiens	Longueuil College Francais (QMJHL)
61	Joe Dziedzic (LW)	United States	Pittsburgh Penguins ^{(from Buffalo)} ^{18}	Edison High School (USHS–MN)
62	Glen Mears (D)	United States	Calgary Flames	Rochester Mustangs (USHL)
63	Cam Stewart (C)	Canada	Boston Bruins	Elmira Sugar Kings (MWJHL)
^{Reference:}

=== Round four ===
#	Player	Nationality	NHL team	College/junior/club team
64	Mike Bodnarchuk (RW)	Canada	New Jersey Devils ^{(from Quebec)} ^{19}	Kingston Frontenacs (OHL)
65	Darin Bader (LW)	Canada	Vancouver Canucks	Saskatoon Blades (WHL)
66	Stewart Malgunas (D)	Canada	Detroit Red Wings	Seattle Thunderbirds (WHL)
67	Joel Blain (LW)	Canada	Edmonton Oilers ^{(from Philadelphia)} ^{20}	Hull Olympiques (QMJHL)
68	Chris Tamer (D)	United States	Pittsburgh Penguins	University of Michigan (CCHA)
69	Jeff Nielsen (RW)	United States	New York Rangers ^{(from New York Islanders via Los Angeles)} ^{21}^{,} ^{22}	Grand Rapids High School (USHS–MN)
70	Cal McGowan (C)	United States	Minnesota North Stars ^{(from Los Angeles via New York Rangers)} ^{23}^{,} ^{24}	Kamloops Blazers (WHL)
71	Frank Kovacs (LW)	Canada	Minnesota North Stars	Regina Pats (WHL)
72	Randy Pearce (LW)	Canada	Washington Capitals	Kitchener Rangers (OHL)
73	Darby Hendrickson (C)	United States	Toronto Maple Leafs	Richfield High School (USHS–MN)
74	Roman Meluzin (RW)	Czechoslovakia	Winnipeg Jets ^{(from New Jersey)} ^{25}	Zetor Brno (Czechoslovakia)
75	Scott Levins (RW)	United States	Winnipeg Jets ^{(from St. Louis)} ^{26}	Tri-City Americans (WHL)
76	Rick Willis (LW)	United States	New York Rangers	Pingree School (USHS–MA)
77	Alexei Zhamnov (C)	Soviet Union	Winnipeg Jets	Dynamo Moscow (USSR)
78	Chris Bright (C)	Canada	Hartford Whalers	Moose Jaw Warriors (WHL)
79	Chris Tucker (C)	United States	Chicago Blackhawks	Bloomington Jefferson High School (USHS–MN)
80	Greg Walters (C)	Canada	Toronto Maple Leafs ^{(from Edmonton)} ^{27}	Ottawa 67's (OHL)
81	Gilbert Dionne (LW)	Canada	Montreal Canadiens	Kitchener Rangers (OHL)
82	Brian McCarthy (C)	United States	Buffalo Sabres	Pingree School (USHS–MA)
83	Paul Kruse (LW)	Canada	Calgary Flames	Kamloops Blazers (WHL)
84	Jerry Buckley (RW)	United States	Boston Bruins	Northwood School (USHS–NY)
^{Reference:}

=== Round five ===
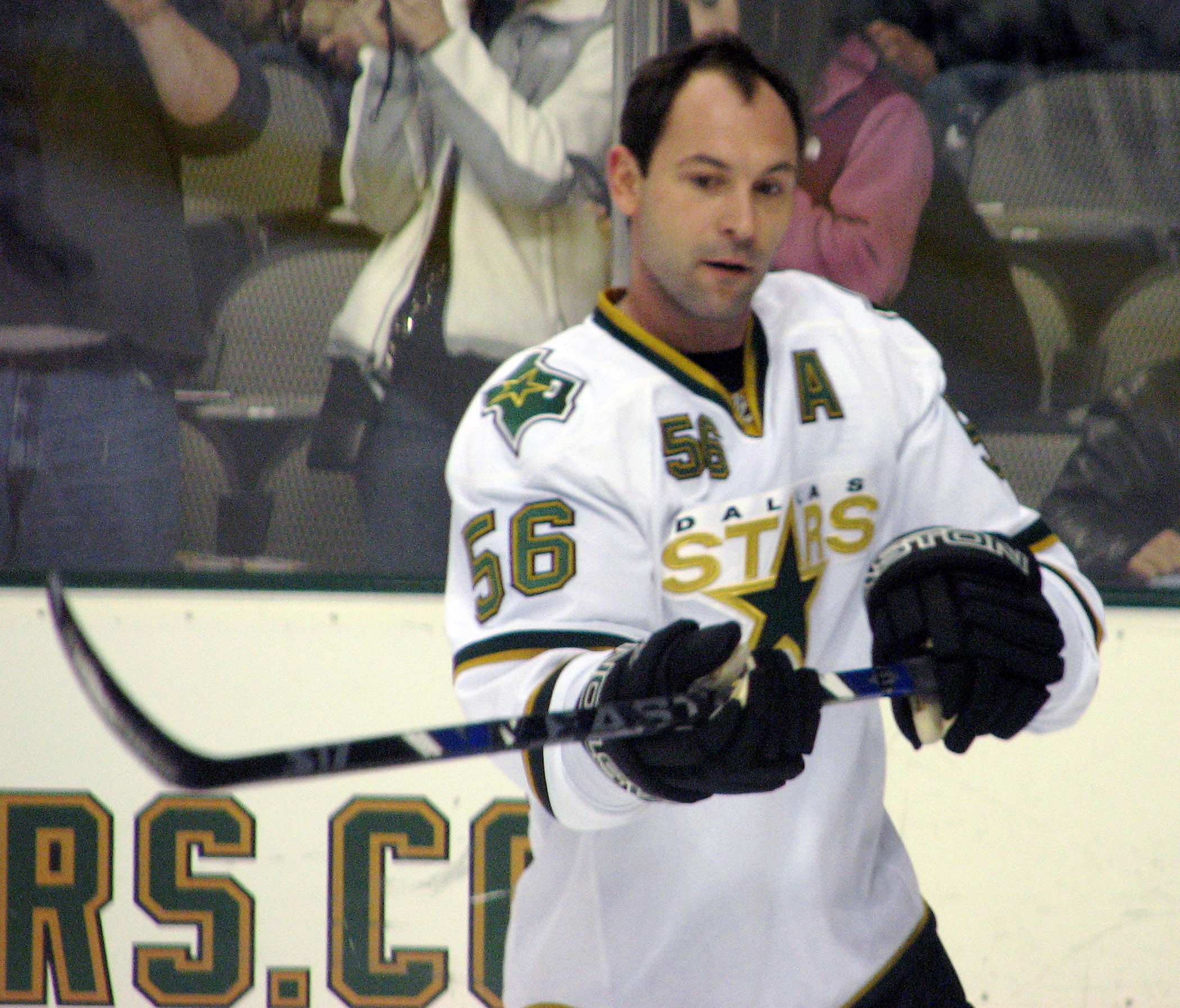
Sergei Zubov was the first pick in round five, going eighty-fifth overall to the New York Rangers.

#	Player	Nationality	NHL team	College/junior/club team
85	Sergei Zubov (D)	Soviet Union	New York Rangers ^{(from Quebec)} ^{28}	CSKA Moscow (USSR)
86	Gino Odjick (LW)	Canada	Vancouver Canucks	Laval Titan (QMJHL)
87	Tony Burns (D)	United States	Detroit Red Wings ^{(from Detroit via New York Rangers)} ^{29}^{,} ^{30}	Duluth-Denfeld High School (USHS–MN)
88	Dan Kordic (D)	Canada	Philadelphia Flyers	Medicine Hat Tigers (WHL)
89	Brian Farrell (C)	United States	Pittsburgh Penguins	Avon Old Farms (USHS–CT)
90	Chris Marinucci (C)	United States	New York Islanders	Grand Rapids High School (USHS–MN)
91	David Goverde (G)	Canada	Los Angeles Kings	Sudbury Wolves (OHL)
92	Enrico Ciccone (D)	Canada	Minnesota North Stars	Trois-Rivieres Draveurs (QMJHL)
93	Brian Sakic (C)	Canada	Washington Capitals	Tri-City Americans (WHL)
94	Mark Ouimet (C)	Canada	Washington Capitals ^{(from Toronto)} ^{31}	University of Michigan (CCHA)
95	Dean Malkoc (D)	Canada	New Jersey Devils	Kamloops Blazers (WHL)
96	Jason Ruff (LW)	Canada	St. Louis Blues	Lethbridge Hurricanes (WHL)
97	Richard Smehlik (D)	Czechoslovakia	Buffalo Sabres ^{(from New York Rangers)} ^{32}	TJ Vitkovice (Czechoslovakia)
98	Craig Martin (RW)	Canada	Winnipeg Jets	Hull Olympiques (QMJHL)
99	Lubos Rob (C)	Czechoslovakia	New York Rangers ^{(from Hartford)} ^{33}	Motor Ceske Budejovice (Czechoslovakia)
100	Todd Bojcun (G)	Canada	Buffalo Sabres ^{(from Chicago)} ^{34}	Peterborough Petes (OHL)
101	Greg Louder (G)	United States	Edmonton Oilers ^{(from Edmonton via Winnipeg)}	Cushing Academy (USHS–MA)
102	Paul DiPietro (C)	Canada	Montreal Canadiens	Sudbury Wolves (OHL)
103	Brad Pascall (D)	Canada	Buffalo Sabres	University of North Dakota (WCHA)
104	Petr Kuchyna (D)	Czechoslovakia	New Jersey Devils ^{(from Calgary)} ^{35}	Dukla Jihlava (Czechoslovakia)
105	Mike Bales (G)	Canada	Boston Bruins	Ohio State University (WCHA)
^{Reference:}

=== Round six ===
#	Player	Nationality	NHL team	College/junior/club team
106	Jeff Parrott (D)	Canada	Quebec Nordiques	University of Minnesota Duluth (WCHA)
107	Ian Moran (D)	United States	Pittsburgh Penguins ^{(from Vancouver)} ^{36}	Belmont Hill School (USHS–MA)
108	Claude Barthe (D)	Canada	Detroit Red Wings	Victoriaville Tigres (QMJHL)
109	Vyacheslav Butsayev (C)	Soviet Union	Philadelphia Flyers	CSKA Moscow (USSR)
110	Denis Casey (G)	Canada	Pittsburgh Penguins	Colorado College (WCHA)
111	Joni Lehto (D)	Finland	New York Islanders	Ottawa 67's (OHL)
112	Erik Andersson (LW)	Sweden	Los Angeles Kings	Danderyds HC (Sweden)
113	Roman Turek (G)	Czechoslovakia	Minnesota North Stars	Motor Ceske Budejovice (Czechoslovakia)
114	Andrey Kovalyov (RW)	Soviet Union	Washington Capitals	Dynamo Moscow (USSR)
115	Alexander Godynyuk (D)	Soviet Union	Toronto Maple Leafs	Sokil Kyiv (USSR)
116	Lubomir Kolnik (RW)	Czechoslovakia	New Jersey Devils	Dukla Trencin (Czechoslovakia)
117	Kurtis Miller (LW)	United States	St. Louis Blues	Rochester Mustangs (USHL)
118	Jason Weinrich (D)	United States	New York Rangers	Springfield Olympics (NEJHL)
119	Daniel Jardemyr (D)	Sweden	Winnipeg Jets	Almtuna IS (Sweden)
120	Cory Keenan (D)	Canada	Hartford Whalers	Kitchener Rangers (OHL)
121	Brett Stickney (C)	United States	Chicago Blackhawks	St. Paul's School (USHS–NH)
122	Keijo Sailynoja (LW)	Finland	Edmonton Oilers	Jokerit (Finland)
123	Craig Conroy (C)	United States	Montreal Canadiens	Northwood School (USHS–NY)
124	Derek Edgerly (C)	United States	Chicago Blackhawks ^{(from Buffalo)} ^{34}	Stoneham High School (USHS–MA)
125	Chris Tschupp (C)	United States	Calgary Flames	Trinity-Pawling School (USHS–NY)
126	Mark Woolf (RW)	Canada	Boston Bruins	Spokane Chiefs (WHL)
^{Reference:}

=== Round seven ===
#	Player	Nationality	NHL team	College/junior/club team
127	Dwayne Norris (RW)	Canada	Quebec Nordiques	Michigan State University (CCHA)
128	Daryl Filipek (D)	Canada	Vancouver Canucks	Ferris State University (CCHA)
129	Jason York (D)	Canada	Detroit Red Wings	Kitchener Rangers (OHL)
130	Mika Valila (C)	Finland	Pittsburgh Penguins ^{(from Philadelphia)} ^{14}	Tappara (Finland)
131	Ken Plaquin (D)	Canada	Pittsburgh Penguins	Michigan Technological University (WCHA)
132	Mike Guilbert (D)	United States	New York Islanders	Governor Dummer Academy (USHS–MA)
133	Robert Lang (C)	Czechoslovakia	Los Angeles Kings	HC CHZ Litvinov (Czechoslovakia)
134	Jeff Levy (G)	United States	Minnesota North Stars	Rochester Mustangs (USHL)
135	Roman Kontsek (RW)	Czechoslovakia	Washington Capitals	Dukla Trenčín (Czechoslovakia)
136	Eric Lacroix (LW)	Canada	Toronto Maple Leafs	Governor Dummer Academy (USHS–MA)
137	Chris McAlpine (D)	United States	New Jersey Devils	Roseville Area High School (USHS–MN)
138	Wayne Conlan (C)	United States	St. Louis Blues	Trinity-Pawling School (USHS–NY)
139	Bryan Lonsinger (D)	United States	New York Rangers	Choate Rosemary Hall (USHS–CT)
140	John Lilley (C)	United States	Winnipeg Jets	Cushing Academy (USHS–MA)
141	Jergus Baca (D)	Czechoslovakia	Hartford Whalers	VSZ Kosice (Czechoslovakia)
142	Viktor Gordiuk (RW)	Soviet Union	Buffalo Sabres ^{(from Chicago)} ^{37}	Krylya Sovetov (USSR)
143	Mike Power (G)	Canada	Edmonton Oilers	Western Michigan University (CCHA)
144	Stephen Rohr (RW)	United States	Montreal Canadiens	Culver Military Academy (USHS–IN)
145	Patrick Neaton (D)	United States	Pittsburgh Penguins ^{(from Buffalo)} ^{38}	University of Michigan (CCHA)
146	Dmitri Frolov (D)	Soviet Union	Calgary Flames	Dynamo Moscow (USSR)
147	Jim Mackey (D)	United States	Boston Bruins	Hotchkiss School (USHS–CT)
^{Reference:}

=== Round eight ===
#	Player	Nationality	NHL team	College/junior/club team
148	Andrei Kovalenko (RW)	Soviet Union	Quebec Nordiques	CSKA Moscow (USSR)
149	Paul O'Hagan (D)	Canada	Vancouver Canucks	Oshawa Generals (OHL)
150	Wes McCauley (D)	Canada	Detroit Red Wings	Michigan State University (CCHA)
151	Patric Englund (LW)	Sweden	Philadelphia Flyers	AIK IF (Sweden)
152	Petteri Koskimaki (C)	Finland	Pittsburgh Penguins	Boston University (Hockey East)
153	Sylvain Fleury (LW)	Canada	New York Islanders	Longueuil College Francais (QMJHL)
154	Dean Hulett (RW)	United States	Los Angeles Kings	Lake Superior State University (CCHA)
155	Doug Barrault (RW)	Canada	Minnesota North Stars	Lethbridge Hurricanes (WHL)
156	Peter Bondra (C)	Czechoslovakia	Washington Capitals	VSŽ Košice (Czechoslovakia)
157	Dan Stiver (RW)	Canada	Toronto Maple Leafs	University of Michigan (CCHA)
158	Alexander Karpovtsev (D)	Soviet Union	Quebec Nordiques ^{(from New Jersey)} ^{19}	Dynamo Moscow (USSR)
159	Steve Martell (RW)	Canada	Washington Capitals ^{(from St. Louis)} ^{39}	London Knights (OHL)
160	Todd Hedlund (RW)	United States	New York Rangers	Roseau High School (USHS–MN)
161	Henrik Andersson (D)	Sweden	Winnipeg Jets	VIK Vasteras HK (Sweden)
162	Martin D'Orsonnens (D)	Canada	Hartford Whalers	Clarkson University (ECAC)
163	Hugo Belanger (LW)	Canada	Chicago Blackhawks	Clarkson University (ECAC)
164	Roman Mejzlik (LW)	Czechoslovakia	Edmonton Oilers	Dukla Jihlava (Czechoslovakia)
165	Brent Fleetwood (LW)	Canada	Montreal Canadiens	Portland Winter Hawks (WHL)
166	Milan Nedoma (D)	Czechoslovakia	Buffalo Sabres	Zetor Brno (Czechoslovakia)
167	Shawn Murray (G)	United States	Calgary Flames	Hill-Murray School (USHS–MN)
168	John Gruden (D)	United States	Boston Bruins	Waterloo Black Hawks (USHL)
^{Reference:}

=== Round nine ===
#	Player	Nationality	NHL team	College/junior/club team
169	Pat Mazzoli (G)	Canada	Quebec Nordiques	Humboldt Broncos (SJHL)
170	Mark Cipriano (RW)	Canada	Vancouver Canucks	Victoria Cougars (WHL)
171	Tony Gruba (RW)	United States	Detroit Red Wings	Hill-Murray School (USHS–MN)
172	Toni Porkka (D)	Finland	Philadelphia Flyers	Lukko (Finland)
173	Ladislav Karabin (LW)	Czechoslovakia	Pittsburgh Penguins	Slovan Bratislava (Czechoslovakia)
174	John Joyce (C)	United States	New York Islanders	Avon Old Farms (USHS–CT)
175	Denis LeBlanc (C)	Canada	Los Angeles Kings	Saint-Hyacinthe Laser (QMJHL)
176	Joe Biondi (C)	United States	Minnesota North Stars	University of Minnesota Duluth (WCHA)
177	Ken Klee (D)	United States	Washington Capitals	Bowling Green State University (CCHA)
178	Robert Horyna (G)	Czechoslovakia	Toronto Maple Leafs	Dukla Jihlava (Czechoslovakia)
179	Jaroslav Modry (D)	Czechoslovakia	New Jersey Devils	Motor Ceske Budejovice (Czechoslovakia)
180	Parris Duffus (G)	United States	St. Louis Blues	Melfort Mustangs (SJHL)
181	Andrew Silverman (D)	United States	New York Rangers	Beverly High School (USHS–MA)
182	Rauli Raitanen (C)	Finland	Winnipeg Jets	Assat (Finland)
183	Corey Osmak (C)	Canada	Hartford Whalers	Nipawin Hawks (SJHL)
184	Owen Lessard (LW)	Canada	Chicago Blackhawks	Owen Sound Platers (OHL)
185	Richard Zemlicka (LW)	Czechoslovakia	Edmonton Oilers	Sparta Prague (Czechoslovakia)
186	Derek Maguire (D)	United States	Montreal Canadiens	Delbarton School (USHS–NJ)
187	Jason Winch (LW)	Canada	Buffalo Sabres	Niagara Falls Thunder (OHL)
188	Michael Murray (RW)	United States	Calgary Flames	Cushing Academy (USHS–MA)
189	Darren Wetherill (D)	Canada	Boston Bruins	Minot Americans (SJHL)
^{Reference:}

=== Round ten ===
#	Player	Nationality	NHL team	College/junior/club team
190	Scott Davis (D)	Canada	Quebec Nordiques	University of Manitoba (CIAU)
191	Troy Neumeier (D)	Canada	Vancouver Canucks	Prince Albert Raiders (WHL)
192	Travis Tucker (D)	United States	Detroit Red Wings	Avon Old Farms (USHS–CT)
193	Greg Hanson (D)	United States	Philadelphia Flyers	Bloomington Kennedy High School (USHS–MN)
194	Tim Fingerhut (LW)	United States	Pittsburgh Penguins	Canterbury High School (USHS–CT)
195	R. J. Enga (RW)	Canada	New York Islanders	Culver Military Academy (USHS–IN)
196	Patrik Ross (RW)	Sweden	Los Angeles Kings	HV71 (Sweden)
197	Troy Binnie (LW)	Canada	Minnesota North Stars	Ottawa 67's (OHL)
198	Mike Boback (C)	United States	Washington Capitals	Providence College (Hockey East)
199	Bob Chebator (LW)	United States	Toronto Maple Leafs	Arlington Catholic High School (USHS–MA)
200	Corey Schwab (G)	Canada	New Jersey Devils	Seattle Thunderbirds (WHL)
201	Steve Widmeyer (RW)	Canada	St. Louis Blues	University of Maine (Hockey East)
202	Jon Hillebrandt (G)	United States	New York Rangers	Monona Grove High School (USHS–WI)
203	Mika Alatalo (LW)	Finland	Winnipeg Jets	Kouvolan Edustuskiekko (Finland)
204	Espen Knutsen (C)	Norway	Hartford Whalers	Valerenga (Norway)
205	Erik Peterson (C)	United States	Chicago Blackhawks	Brockton High School (USHS-MA)
206	Petr Korinek (C)	Czechoslovakia	Edmonton Oilers	Skoda Plzen (Czechoslovakia)
207	Mark Kettelhut (D)	United States	Montreal Canadiens	East High School (USHS–MN)
208	Sylvain Naud (RW)	Canada	Buffalo Sabres	Laval Titan (QMJHL)
209	Rob Sumner (D)	Canada	Calgary Flames	Victoria Cougars (WHL)
210	Dean Capuano (D)	United States	Boston Bruins	Mount St. Charles Academy (USHS–RI)
^{Reference:}

=== Round eleven ===
#	Player	Nationality	NHL team	College/junior/club team
211	Mika Stromberg (D)	Finland	Quebec Nordiques	Jokerit (Finland)
212	Tyler Ertel (C)	Canada	Vancouver Canucks	North Bay Centennials (OHL)
213	Brett Larson (D)	United States	Detroit Red Wings	Duluth Denfeld High School (USHS–MN)
214	Tommy Soderstrom (G)	Sweden	Philadelphia Flyers	Djurgardens IF (Sweden)
215	Michael Thompson (F)	Canada	Pittsburgh Penguins	Michigan State University (CCHA)
216	Martin Lacroix (RW)	Canada	New York Islanders	St. Lawrence University (ECAC)
217	Kevin White (C)	Canada	Los Angeles Kings	Windsor Spitfires (OHL)
218	Ole Eskild Dahlstrom (C)	Norway	Minnesota North Stars	Furuset (Norway)
219	Alan Brown (D)	Canada	Washington Capitals	Colgate University (ECAC)
220	Scott Malone (D)	United States	Toronto Maple Leafs	Northfield Mount Hermon School (USHS–MA)
221	Valeri Zelepukin (LW)	Soviet Union	New Jersey Devils	Khimik Voskresensk (USSR)
222	Joe Hawley (C)	Canada	St. Louis Blues	Peterborough Petes (OHL)
223	Brett Lievers (C)	United States	New York Rangers	Wayzata High School (USHS–MN)
224	Sergei Selyanin (D)	Soviet Union	Winnipeg Jets	Khimik Voskresensk (USSR)
225	Tommie Eriksen (D)	Norway	Hartford Whalers	Prince Albert Raiders (WHL)
226	Steve Dubinsky (C)	Canada	Chicago Blackhawks	Clarkson University (ECAC)
228	John Uniac (D)	Canada	Montreal Canadiens	Kitchener Rangers (OHL)
229	Ken Martin (LW)	United States	Buffalo Sabres	Belmont Hill High School (USHS–MA)
231	Andy Bezeau (LW)	Canada	Boston Bruins	Niagara Falls Thunder (OHL)
^{Reference:}

=== Round twelve ===
#	Player	Nationality	NHL team	College/junior/club team
232	Wade Klippenstein (LW)	Canada	Quebec Nordiques	University of Alaska Fairbanks (NCAA Independent)
233	Karri Kivi (D)	Finland	Vancouver Canucks	Ilves (Finland)
234	John Hendry (LW)	Canada	Detroit Red Wings	Lake Superior State University (CCHA)
235	Billy Lund (C)	United States	Philadelphia Flyers	Roseau High School (USHS–MN)
236	Brian Bruininks (D)	United States	Pittsburgh Penguins	Colorado College (WCHA)
237	Andrew Shier (RW)	United States	New York Islanders	Detroit Junior Red Wings (USHL)
238	Troy Mohns (D)	Canada	Los Angeles Kings	Colgate University (ECAC)
239	J. P. McKersie (G)	United States	Minnesota North Stars	Madison West High School (USHS–WI)
240	Todd Hlushko (LW)	Canada	Washington Capitals	London Knights (OHL)
241	Nicholas Vachon (LW)	Canada	Toronto Maple Leafs	Governor Dummer Academy (USHS–MA)
242	Todd Reirden (D)	United States	New Jersey Devils	Tabor Academy (USHS–MA)
243	Joe Fleming (D)	United States	St. Louis Blues	Xaverian High School (USHS–MA)
244	Sergei Nemchinov (C)	Soviet Union	New York Rangers	Krylya Sovetov (USSR)
245	Keith Morris (LW)	Canada	Winnipeg Jets	University of Alaska Anchorage (NCAA Independent)
246	Denis Chalifoux (C)	Canada	Hartford Whalers	Laval Titan (QMJHL)
247	Dino Grossi (F)	Canada	Chicago Blackhawks	Northeastern University (Hockey East)
248	Sami Nuutinen (D)	Finland	Edmonton Oilers	Kiekko-Espoo (Finland)
249	Sergei Martinyuk (RW)	Soviet Union	Montreal Canadiens	Torpedo Yaroslavl (USSR)
250	Brad Rubachuk (C)	Canada	Buffalo Sabres	Lethbridge Hurricanes (WHL)
251	Leo Gudas (D)	Czechoslovakia	Calgary Flames	Sparta Prague (Czechoslovakia)
252	Ted Miskolczi (RW)	Canada	Boston Bruins	Belleville Bulls (OHL)
^{Reference:}

== Draftees based on nationality ==
Rank	Country	Amount
	North America	195
1	Canada	123
2	United States	72
	Europe	57
3	Czechoslovakia	22
4	Soviet Union	14
5	Finland	11
6	Sweden	7
7	Norway	3

== See also ==
- 1990 NHL supplemental draft
- 1990–91 NHL season
- List of NHL players

== Notes ==
- ^1 Although born in Northern Ireland, Owen Nolan has Canadian citizenship and represented Canada internationally.
- ^2 Although born in Czechoslovakia, Petr Nedved would later represent Canada and the Czech Republic internationally as a professional; he had represented Czechoslovakia in junior hockey in 1989.
- ^3 The Calgary Flames traded their first round selection in 1990, Detroit's second round selection in 1990 (previously acquired), and Minnesota's second round selection in 1990 (previously acquired) to the New Jersey Devils for the Devils' first and second round selections in 1990.
- ^4 The Montreal Canadiens traded Mike Lalor and their first round selection in 1990 to the St. Louis Blues for the Blues' first round selection in 1990 and the Blues' third round selection in the 1991 NHL entry draft (later re-acquired by St. Louis — Nathan LaFayette).
- ^5 The Buffalo Sabres traded Scott Arniel, Phil Housley, Jeff Parker, and their first round selection in 1990 to the Winnipeg Jets for Dale Hawerchuk and the Jets' first round selection in 1990.
- ^6 The St. Louis Blues traded Adrien Plavsic and Montreal's first round selection in 1990 (previously acquired) to the Vancouver Canucks for Harold Snepsts, Rich Sutter, and St. Louis' second round selection in 1990 (previously acquired).
- ^7 The Calgary Flames traded Brad McCrimmon to the Detroit Red Wings for the Wings' second round selection in 1990.
- ^8 The Calgary Flames traded Joe Mullen to the Pittsburgh Penguins for the Penguins' second round selection in 1990.
- ^9 The Calgary Flames traded Peter Lappin to the Minnesota North Stars for the North Stars' second round selection in 1990.
- ^10 The St. Louis Blues traded Robert Nordmark and their second round selection in 1990 to the Vancouver Canucks for Dave Richter.
- ^11 The Buffalo Sabres traded Kevin Maguire and their second round selection in 1990 to the Philadelphia Flyers for Jay Wells and the Flyers' fourth round selection in the 1991 NHL Entry Draft (Peter Ambroziak).
- ^12 The Boston Bruins traded their second round selection in 1990 to the Philadelphia Flyers for Brian Propp.
- ^13 The Philadelphia Flyers traded Darren Jensen and Daryl Stanley to the Vancouver Canucks for Wendell Young and the Canucks' third round selection in 1990.
- ^14 The Philadelphia Flyers traded Wendell Young and their seventh round selection in 1990 to the Pittsburgh Penguins for the Penguins' third round selection in 1990.
- ^15 The Philadelphia Flyers traded Kevin Maguire and their eighth round selection in the 1991 NHL Entry Draft (Dmitri Mironov) to the Toronto Maple Leafs for the Leafs' third round selection in 1990.
- ^16 New Jersey Devils traded Alain Chevrier and their seventh round selection in the 1989 NHL entry draft (Doug Evans) to the Winnipeg Jets for Steve Rooney and the Jets' third round selection in 1990.
- ^17 The Chicago Blackhawks traded their third round selection in 1990 to the Montreal Canadiens for Jocelyn Lemieux.
- ^18 The Buffalo Sabres traded Tom Barrasso and their third round selection in 1990 to the Pittsburgh Penguins for Doug Bodger and Darrin Shannon.
- ^19 The New Jersey Devils traded Joe Cirella, Claude Loiselle, and their eighth round selection in 1990 to the Quebec Nordiques for Walt Poddubny and the Nordiques' fourth round selection in 1990.
- ^20 The Edmonton Oilers traded Normand Lacombe to the Philadelphia Flyers for the Flyers' fourth round selection in 1990.
- ^21 The Los Angeles Kings received the New York Islanders' fourth round selection in 1990 as compensation for the Islanders signing Glenn Healy.
- ^22 The Los Angeles Kings traded the New York Islanders' fourth round selection in 1990 (previously acquired) to the New York Rangers for Barry Beck.
- ^23 The Los Angeles Kings traded their fourth round selection in 1990 to the New York Rangers for Dean Kennedy.
- ^24 The Minnesota North Stars traded Mike Gartner to the New York Rangers for Ulf Dahlen and Los Angeles' fourth round selection in 1990 (previously acquired).
- ^25 The New Jersey Devils traded their fourth round selection in 1990 to the Winnipeg Jets for George McPhee.
- ^26 The St. Louis Blues traded Kent Carlson, their twelfth round selection in the 1989 NHL Entry Draft (Sergei Kharin), and their fourth round selection in 1990 to the Winnipeg Jets for Peter Douris.
- ^27 The Edmonton Oilers traded their fourth round selection in 1990 to the Toronto Maple Leafs for Vladimir Ruzicka.
- ^28 The New York Rangers received the Quebec Nordiques' fifth round selection in 1990 as compensation for the Nordiques signing Guy Lafleur.
- ^29 The Detroit Red Wings traded their fifth round selection in 1990 to the New York Rangers for Jim Pavese.
- ^30 The Detroit Red Wings traded Kris King to the New York Rangers for Chris McRae and Detroit's fifth round selection in 1990 (previously acquired).
- ^31 The Toronto Maple Leafs traded their fifth round selection in 1990 to the Washington Capitals for Lou Franceschetti.
- ^32 The Buffalo Sabres traded Lindy Ruff to the New York Rangers for the Rangers' fifth round selection in 1990.
- ^33 The Hartford Whalers traded Carey Wilson and their fifth round selection in 1990 to the New York Rangers for Brian Lawton, Don Maloney, and Norm Maciver.
- ^34 The Buffalo Sabres traded Jacques Cloutier and their sixth round selection in 1990 to the Chicago Blackhawks for Steve Ludzik and the Blackhawks' fifth round selection in 1990.
- ^35 The Calgary Flames traded their fifth round selection in 1990 to the New Jersey Devils for Jim Korn.
- ^36 The Pittsburgh Penguins traded Rod Buskas to the Vancouver Canucks for the Canucks' sixth round selection in 1990.
- ^37 The Buffalo Sabres traded Wayne Van Dorp to the Chicago Blackhawks for the Blackhawks' seventh round selection in 1990.
- ^38 The Buffalo Sabres traded their seventh round selection in 1990 to the Pittsburgh Penguins for Wayne Van Dorp.
- ^39 The St. Louis Blues traded Rob Whistle and their eighth round selection in 1990 to the Washington Capitals for the Capitals' sixth round selection in the 1989 NHL Entry Draft (Derek Frenette).
