= Sylvain Fleury =

Canadian ice hockey player

- Born: April 30, 1970 (age 56) Drummondville, Quebec, Canada
- Height: 6 ft 0 in (183 cm)
- Weight: 190 lb (86 kg; 13 st 8 lb)
- Position: Centre
- Shot: Left
- Played for: ECHL; Dayton Bombers; South Carolina Stingrays; CHL; Oklahoma City Blazers; CoHL; Detroit Falcons; Saginaw Wheels
- NHL draft: 153rd overall, 1990; New York Islanders
- Playing career: 1991–1996

Sylvain Fleury (born April 30, 1970) is a Canadian former professional ice hockey player. He was selected by the New York Islanders in the 8th round (153rd overall) of the 1990 NHL entry draft.

Fleury played major junior hockey with the Longueuil Collège Français of the QMJHL.

Fleury went on to play six years of professional hockey, including the 1992–93 season spent with the Oklahoma City Blazers of the Central Hockey League (CHL) where he led the league with 101 points and was named the CHL's most valuable player.

== Career statistics ==
			Regular season					Playoffs
Season	Team	League	GP	G	A	Pts	PIM	GP	G	A	Pts	PIM
1986–87	Cantons de l'Est Cantonniers	QMAAA	35	17	28	45	8	7	3	2	5	0
1988–89	Longueuil Collège Français	QMJHL	69	47	54	101	59	—	—	—	—	—
1989–90	Longueuil Collège Français	QMJHL	70	50	75	125	26	7	5	5	10	0
1990–91	Longueuil Collège Français	QMJHL	68	36	61	97	29	8	7	6	13	2
1991–92	Dayton Bombers	ECHL	59	27	30	57	13	3	3	0	3	2
1992–93	Oklahoma City Blazers	CHL	59	48	53	101	24	6	5	3	8	8
1993–94	South Carolina Stingrays	ECHL	68	46	49	95	36	3	2	1	3	2
1994–95	South Carolina Stingrays	ECHL	50	15	32	47	10	—	—	—	—	—
1995–96	Detroit Falcons	CoHL	16	4	7	11	4	—	—	—	—	—
1995–96	Saginaw Wheels	CoHL	34	20	24	44	20	—	—	—	—	—
ECHL totals			177	88	111	199	59	6	5	1	6	4

== Awards and honours ==
Award	Year
Joe Burton Award - CHL Scoring Champion	1992–93
CHL Most Valuable Player	1992–93
