= Robert Horyna =

Czech ice hockey goaltender

- Born: August 10, 1970 (age 55) Hradec Králové, Czechoslovakia
- Height: 5 ft 11 in (180 cm)
- Weight: 185 lb (84 kg; 13 st 3 lb)
- Position: Goaltender
- Caught: Left
- Played for: ASD Jihlava; HC Stadion Hradec Králové; HC Olomouc; HC Karlovy Vary; HC Slavia Praha; HC SKP Poprad; HC Havířov
- NHL draft: 178th overall, 1990; Toronto Maple Leafs
- Playing career: 1989–2000

Robert Horyna (born August 10, 1970) is a Czech former professional ice hockey goaltender.

Horyna was drafted 178th overall by the Toronto Maple Leafs in the 1990 NHL entry draft. He played in the American Hockey League for the Newmarket Saints, St. John's Maple Leafs and Utica Devils but never played in the NHL. He also played in the Czech Extraliga for HC Stadion Hradec Králové, HC Olomouc, HC Karlovy Vary, HC Slavia Praha and HC Havířov.

Horyna played in the 1990 World Junior Ice Hockey Championships for Czechoslovakia.
