= Brad Pascall =

Canadian ice hockey player

- Born: July 29, 1970 (age 55) Coquitlam, British Columbia, Canada
- Height: 6 ft 2 in (188 cm)
- Weight: 192 lb (87 kg; 13 st 10 lb)
- Position: Defence
- Shot: Left
- Played for: AHL; Rochester Americans; ECHL; Erie Panthers; South Carolina Stingrays; Birmingham Bulls
- NHL draft: 103rd overall, 1990; Buffalo Sabres
- Playing career: 1992–1995

Brad Pascall (born July 29, 1970) is a Canadian ice hockey executive and former player who played as a defenceman.

== Playing career ==
Pascall was selected by the Buffalo Sabres in the 5th round (103rd overall) of the 1990 NHL entry draft.

== Executive career ==
He is currently an assistant general manager with the Calgary Flames of the National Hockey League (NHL), as well as the general manager of their AHL affiliate: the Calgary Wranglers. Following his retirement as a player, Pascall worked for Hockey Canada for nearly two decades, eventually serving as vice-president of hockey operations.

== Personal life ==
His wife, Cassie Campbell, captained the Canada women's national ice hockey team to gold medal victories at both the 2002 and 2006 Winter Olympics. His father, Bernie Pascall, was a sportscaster for the CTV Television Network in the 1970s and '80s and television play-by-play broadcaster for the Vancouver Canucks.

== Career statistics ==
=== Regular season and playoffs ===
			Regular season					Playoffs
Season	Team	League	GP	G	A	Pts	PIM	GP	G	A	Pts	PIM
1988–89	University of North Dakota	NCAA	3	0	0	0	0	—	—	—	—	—
1989–90	University of North Dakota	NCAA	45	1	9	10	98	—	—	—	—	—
1990–91	University of North Dakota	NCAA	38	1	4	5	81	—	—	—	—	—
1991–92	University of North Dakota	NCAA	28	0	7	7	85	—	—	—	—	—
1992–93	Rochester Americans	AHL	18	0	1	1	38	—	—	—	—	—
1992–93	Erie Panthers	ECHL	24	0	6	6	26	5	0	1	1	18
1993–94	Rochester Americans	AHL	35	2	0	2	33	3	0	0	0	0
1993–94	South Carolina Stingrays	ECHL	32	1	5	6	68	3	0	1	1	4
1994–95	Birmingham Bulls	ECHL	38	2	9	11	53	7	0	2	2	12
1994–95	South Carolina Stingrays	ECHL	28	0	4	4	76	—	—	—	—	—
AHL totals			53	2	1	3	71	3	0	0	0	0
ECHL totals			122	3	24	27	223	15	0	4	4	34
