= Scott Scissons =

Canadian ice hockey player

- Born: October 29, 1971 (age 54) Saskatoon, Saskatchewan, Canada
- Height: 5 ft 11 in (180 cm)
- Weight: 216 lb (98 kg; 15 st 6 lb)
- Position: Centre
- Shot: Left
- Played for: New York Islanders
- NHL draft: 6th overall, 1990; New York Islanders
- Playing career: 1991–1995

Scott Scissons (born October 29, 1971) is a Canadian former professional ice hockey player. He was drafted in the first round, sixth overall, by the New York Islanders in the 1990 NHL entry draft. While a high percentage of players selected in the first round of that draft went on to productive National Hockey League (NHL) careers, Scissons was one of the few busts, playing just two regular season NHL games (none of the other top eight picks in the 1990 draft played fewer than 909 games in the NHL) and one playoff game, going scoreless in all.

Scissons was chosen ahead of many players who went on to long NHL careers, including: Darryl Sydor, Derian Hatcher, Peter Bondra, Doug Weight and Keith Tkachuk, and Martin Brodeur.

During his three seasons in the Western Hockey League with the Saskatoon Blades, Scissons made an impact, scoring 30 goals and 56 assists in his rookie season, plus 40 goals in his sophomore one, to climb up on the scout rankings for the 1990 draft. However, soon the injuries that would mar his career would manifest. At 18, Scissons underwent a discectomy, followed by a wrist injury, ailments that cost him spots at Team Canada for two straight World Junior Ice Hockey Championships. Scissons made his NHL debut with the Islanders, appearing in one game at the end of the 1990–91 season. He then spent the 1991–92 season playing with the Canadian National Hockey Team, and during a game with the Montreal Canadiens injured his shoulder in a check by John LeClair. However, he was not chosen to represent Canada at the 1992 Winter Olympics.

Scissons spent the 1992–93 season playing with the Islanders' American Hockey League affiliate, the Capital District Islanders. He did, however, appear in one game with the Islanders during the 1993 Stanley Cup playoffs. He appeared in one more game with them during the 1993–94 season, and spent the remainder of the year with the Salt Lake Golden Eagles of the International Hockey League. He then played 30 IHL games in the 1994–95 season with the Minnesota Moose and Denver Grizzlies. In 1995, Scissons tried out for the Dallas Stars, but a pessimistic assessment by the team doctor led to an early retirement at the age of 22. He returned to Saskatoon, got his certificate in commerce, and started working on his family business, Western Mobile Homes. Scissons also played sporadically with the Saskatoon Old Pros and coached his son's hockey teams. His younger brother Jeff was also a hockey player, taken 172nd in the 1996 NHL entry draft by the Vancouver Canucks, but never made it to the major league.

== Career statistics ==
			Regular season					Playoffs
Season	Team	League	GP	G	A	Pts	PIM	GP	G	A	Pts	PIM
1985–86	Saskatoon Flyers	SMHL	65	45	55	100	45	—	—	—	—	—
1986–87	Saskatoon Flyers	SMHL	62	65	55	120	50	—	—	—	—	—
1987–88	Saskatoon Contacts	SMHL	29	23	16	39	51	—	—	—	—	—
1988–89	Saskatoon Blades	WHL	71	30	56	86	65	7	0	4	4	16
1989–90	Saskatoon Blades	WHL	61	40	47	87	81	10	3	8	11	6
1990–91	Saskatoon Blades	WHL	57	24	53	77	61	—	—	—	—	—
1990–91	New York Islanders	NHL	1	0	0	0	0	—	—	—	—	—
1991–92	Canada	Intl	26	4	8	12	31	—	—	—	—	—
1992–93	Capital District Islanders	AHL	43	14	30	44	33	4	0	0	0	0
1992–93	New York Islanders	NHL	—	—	—	—	—	1	0	0	0	0
1993–94	New York Islanders	NHL	1	0	0	0	0	—	—	—	—	—
1993–94	Salt Lake Golden Eagles	IHL	72	10	26	36	123	—	—	—	—	—
1994–95	Denver Grizzlies	IHL	7	2	3	5	6	—	—	—	—	—
1994–95	Minnesota Moose	IHL	23	7	9	16	6	—	—	—	—	—
NHL totals			2	0	0	0	0	1	0	0	0	0
IHL totals			102	19	38	57	135	—	—	—	—	—

Preceded by Dave Chyzowski	New York Islanders first-round draft pick 1990	Succeeded by Scott Lachance
