= Ron Berteling =

Dutch ice hockey player (born 1957)

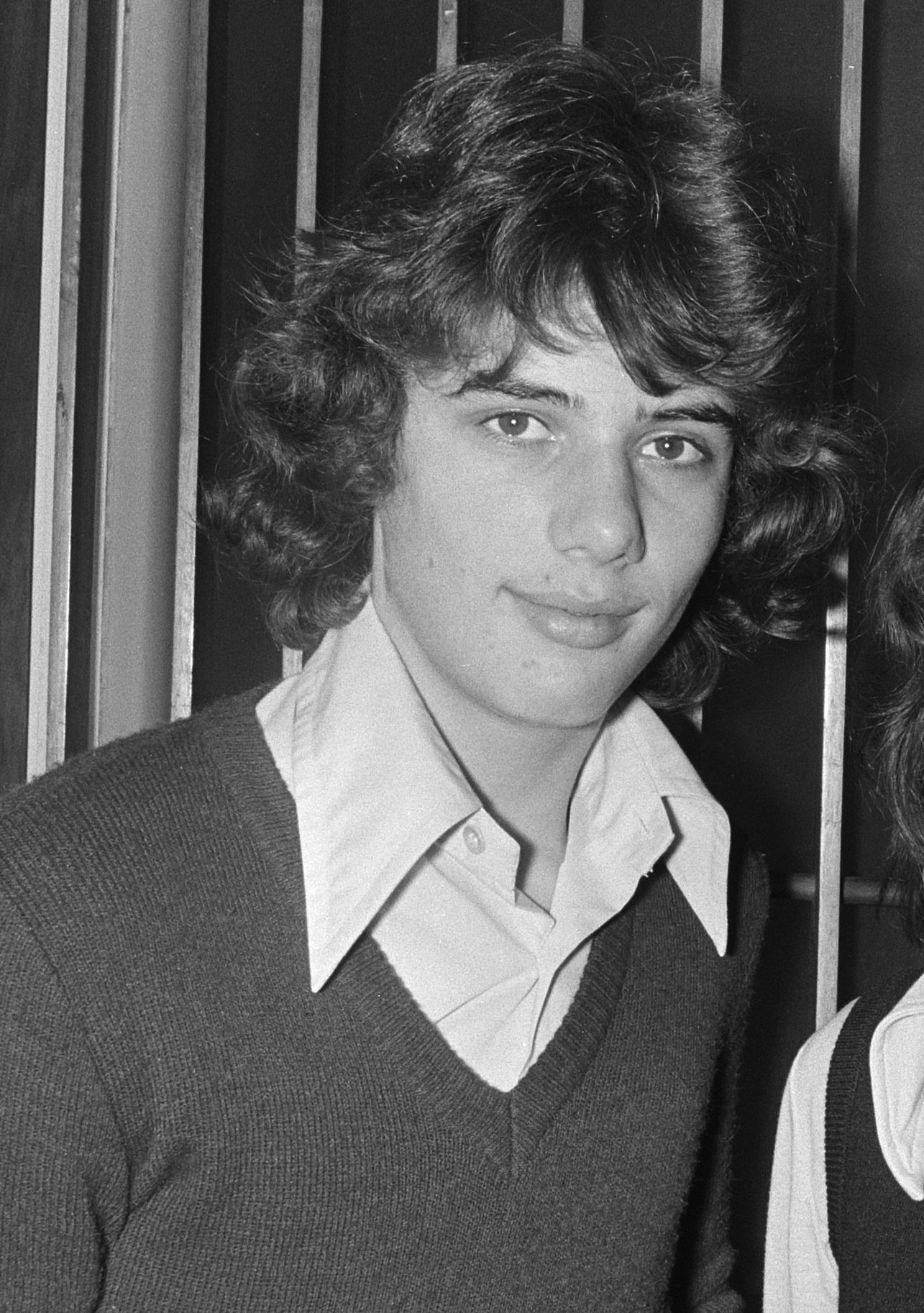
- Berteling in 1975
- Born: 6 September 1957 (age 68) Amsterdam, Netherlands
- Height: 187 cm (6 ft 2 in)
- Weight: 85 kg (187 lb; 13 st 5 lb)
- Position: Forward
- Shot: Left
- Played for: Amsterdam Tigers; Rotterdam Panda's; Amsterdam G's
- National team: Netherlands
- Playing career: 1974–2013

Ron Berteling (born 6 September 1957) is a Dutch retired ice hockey player and coach. He represented the Netherlands ice hockey at the 1980 Winter Olympics, and served as captain of the Netherlands men's national ice hockey team from 1982 to 1993. He appeared in 14 Ice Hockey World Championships, and holds the record of 213 games played for the national team. He played in 26 seasons of the Eredivisie, competing the Netherlands' top league for the Amsterdam Tigers and the Rotterdam Panda's. He was named the league's most valuable player for the 1987–88 season, won four Eredivisie titles, five Dutch Cups as a player and a sixth as a coach. He received the Order of Orange-Nassau in 1994, was made the namesake of the Ron Berteling Schaal in 2007, and received the Torriani Award from the International Ice Hockey Federation in 2020.

== Early life ==
Berteling was born on 6 September 1957, in Amsterdam, Netherlands. His family was active in sports and basketball. He began ice skating at age seven, and also played football and tennis as a youth. He began playing ice hockey in 1964, on the only outdoor rink in Amsterdam. He was attracted to the game due to its speed and the desire to play a team sport. Wayne Gretzky was one of his early hockey heroes.

== Playing career ==
Berteling's professional hockey career began at age 17, when he made his debut in the Netherlands' top league (Eredivisie) during the 1974–75 season. His first Ice Hockey World Championships was in 1978 with the Netherlands men's national ice hockey team at age 20, in which he helped his country earn promotion from Group C to Group B. He returned the following year and helped the Netherlands earn promotion again at the 1979 World Championships from Group B to Group A for the 1981 World Championships, and qualify for ice hockey at the 1980 Winter Olympics. He won his first Dutch Cup as a player, with Amsterdam in 1980. He became captain of the Netherlands national team in 1982, serving in the role until 1993. Playing on Amsterdam, he won his first Eredivisie and another Dutch Cup in 1985.

Berteling changed teams in 1986, and won another Eredivisie title and a Dutch Cup with Rotterdam in 1987. He was named the most valuable player of the Eredivisie for the 1987–88 season, and received the Frans Henrichs Cup. He won two more Eredivisie titles with Rotterdam in 1989 and 1990, and two Dutch Cups in 1990 and 1991. He initially retired as a professional player in 1995, but returned three seasons later to the Netherlands second division. He played 11 games during the 1998–99 Eredivisie season and appeared in the 1999 Men's Ice Hockey World Championships at age 41. He played a total of 13 professional games during the next 14 seasons as a part-time player, and as an occasional player-coach until 2013.

Berteling finished his career playing 213 games and scored 195 points for the Netherlands national team at World Championships, the Olympic Games and other international events. He holds the record of the most games played for the national team as of 2020. He scored more than 1,600 points and played over 900 career games combined in all levels of play, and appeared in 14 Ice Hockey World Championships. He was referred to as "Mister Ice Hockey" in the Netherlands, and was respected for his sportsmanship and was regularly among the least penalised players in the Netherlands.

== Coaching career ==
Berteling served as head coach of the Amsterdam Tigers from 2006 to 2011. While coaching the Tigers, he won his sixth Dutch Cup in 2007, and served as an assistant coach on the Netherlands men's national under-18 ice hockey team. He later served as head coach of the Amsterdam Capitals during the 2011–12 season, the Amsterdam G's during the 2012–13 season, and the Amsterdam Tigers again during the 2015–16 season. During the 2012–13 season, he played one game in the Eredivisie at age 55, on a forward line with his son. Berteling retired from coaching professional hockey in 2016.

== Later life ==
Berteling retired to live in Amsterdam with his wife. He has stated that, "Amsterdam is a big city, but unfortunately there is little to no hockey publicity". He felt hockey teams should use social media to attract people to the game. In retirement from coaching, he has focused on teaching hockey at clinics, and worked a motivational speaker for sports teams. As of 2020, he was conducting training sessions for youths and adults in Alkmaar, and wanted to stay involved for the love of the game.

== Honours and awards ==
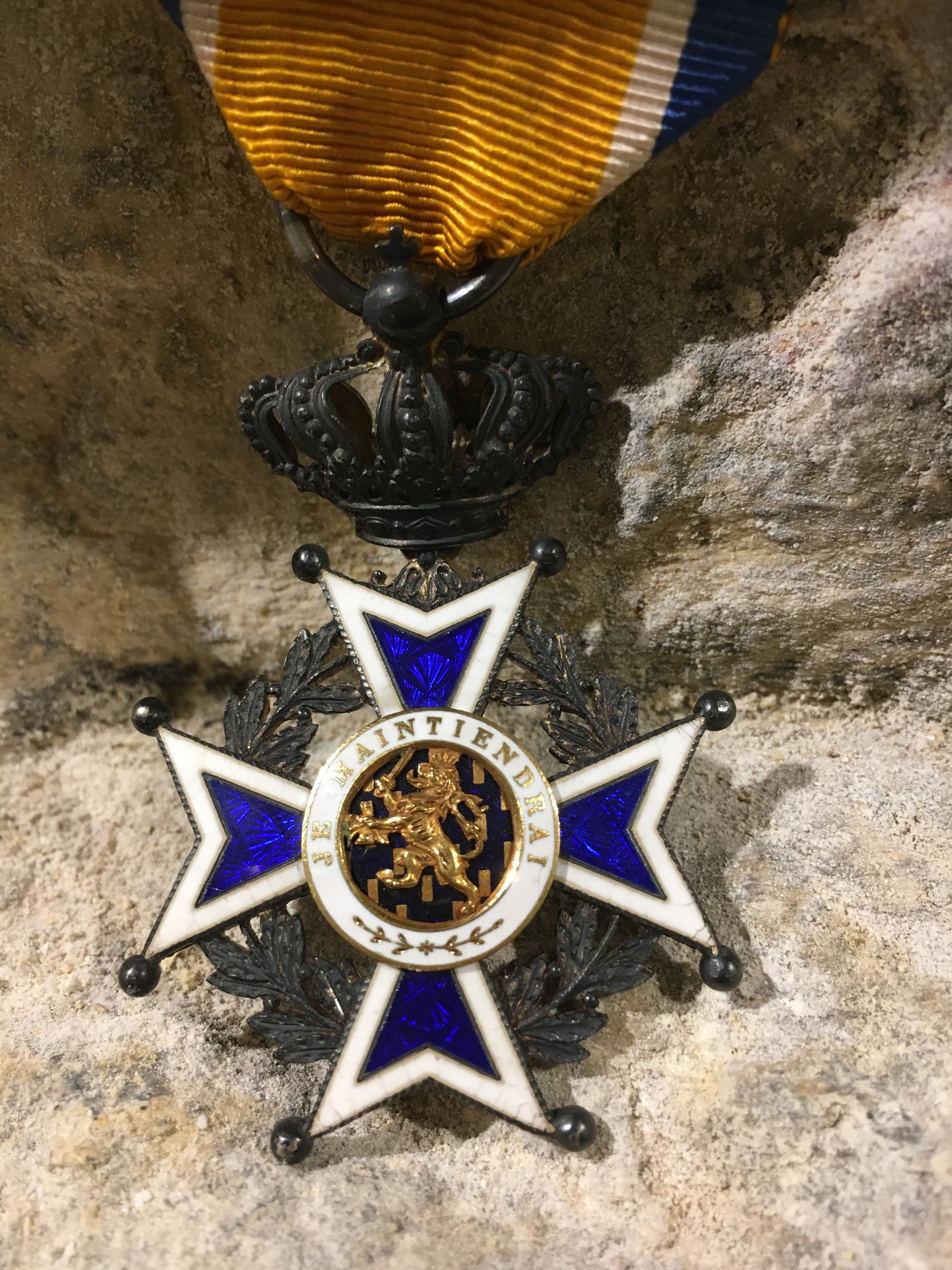
Knight's Cross of the Order of Orange-Nassau

Berteling became the first Dutch hockey player to be knighted in the Netherlands, when he received the Order of Orange-Nassau in 1994. The Netherlands Ice Hockey Association established the Ron Berteling Schaal in 2007 named after him. It is a cup competition played as the first game of a season, between the winner of the previous Eredivisie season and the reigning Dutch Cup champion. On 4 February 2020, the International Ice Hockey Federation (IIHF) named him that year's recipient of the Torriani Award, for an ice hockey player with an "outstanding career from non-top hockey nation". The formal presentation was scheduled for the 2020 IIHF World Championship in Zürich, but was delayed due to the COVID-19 pandemic until the 2020/2022 IIHF Hall of Fame induction ceremony at the 2022 IIHF World Championship. Berteling was the first Dutch person to receive the Torriani Award.

== Career statistics ==
Professional Netherlands league statistics.

			Regular Season
Season	Team	League	GP	G	A	Pts	PIM
1974–75	Amsterdam Tigers	Eredivisie	1	1	1	2	2
1975–76	Amsterdam Tigers	Eredivisie	25	13	16	29	14
1976–77	Amsterdam Tigers	Eredivisie	32	12	24	36	12
1977–78	Amsterdam Tigers	Eredivisie	30	19	29	48	4
1978–79	Amsterdam Tigers	Eredivisie	36	24	29	53	28
1979–80	Amsterdam Tigers	Eredivisie	30	17	25	42	32
1980–81	Amsterdam Tigers	Eredivisie	31	31	31	62	20
1981–82	Amsterdam Tigers	Eredivisie	28	25	27	52	28
1982–83	Amsterdam Tigers	Eredivisie	28	25	23	48	12
1983–84	Amsterdam Tigers	Eredivisie	28	26	28	54	10
1984–85	Amsterdam Tigers	Eredivisie	35	34	49	83	20
1985–86	Amsterdam Tigers	Eredivisie	38	34	42	76	32
1986–87	Rotterdam Panda's	Eredivisie	26	17	23	40	16
1987–88	Rotterdam Panda's	Eredivisie	28	30	37	67	10
1988–89	Rotterdam Panda's	Eredivisie	27	12	24	36	10
1989–90	Rotterdam Panda's	Eredivisie	28	21	22	43	18
1990–91	Rotterdam Panda's	Eredivisie	24	17	21	38	2
1991–92	Rotterdam Panda's	Eredivisie	34	20	36	56	16
1992–93	Rotterdam Panda's	Eredivisie	28	16	37	53	12
1993–94	Rotterdam Panda's	Eredivisie	20	22	32	54	4
1994–95	Rotterdam Panda's	Eredivisie	36	27	38	65	6
1997–98	Amsterdam Tigers II	Eerste Divisie	4	8	5	13	4
1998–99	Amsterdam Tigers	Eredivisie	11	7	8	15	2
1999–2000	Amsterdam Tigers	Eredivisie	4	3	1	4	2
2001–02	Amsterdam Tigers	Eredivisie	2	0	0	0	0
2006–07	Amsterdam Tigers	Eredivisie	4	2	2	4	2
2010–11	Amsterdam Tigers II	Eerste Divisie	1	3	2	5	0
2012–13	Amsterdam G's	Eredivisie	1	0	0	0	0
Eredivisie regular season totals			615	455	605	1060	314

=== International play ===
International statistics at the World Championships and Winter Olympics.

Year	Team	Event	Result	GP	G	A	Pts	PIM
1978	Netherlands	World Championships Group C	1st place, gold medalist(s)	7	3	4	7	8
1979	Netherlands	World Championships Group B	1st place, gold medalist(s)	6	3	2	5	0
1980	Netherlands	Winter Olympics	9th	5	0	0	0	0
1981	Netherlands	World Championships Group A	8th	8	2	0	2	0
1982	Netherlands	World Championships Group B	8th	7	0	2	2	4
1983	Netherlands	World Championships Group C	1st place, gold medalist(s)	7	7	8	15	6
1985	Netherlands	World Championships Group B	6th	7	3	3	6	10
1986	Netherlands	World Championships Group B	5th	7	2	5	7	4
1987	Netherlands	World Championships Group B	7th	7	5	5	10	2
1989	Netherlands	World Championships Group C	1st place, gold medalist(s)	7	5	6	11	2
1990	Netherlands	World Championships Group B	8th	7	1	1	2	4
1991	Netherlands	World Championships Group B	7th	7	2	1	3	4
1992	Netherlands	World Championships Group B	2nd place, silver medalist(s)	7	4	7	11	2
1993	Netherlands	World Championships Group B	3rd place, bronze medalist(s)	7	4	6	10	6
1999	Netherlands	World Championships Group C	1st place, gold medalist(s)	5	7	0	7	4
Winter Olympics and World Championships totals				101	48	50	98	56
