= 2013–14 Eredivisie (ice hockey) season =

2013-14 Eredivisie Season
- League: Eredivisie (ice hockey)
- Sport: Ice hockey
- Duration: 30 September 2013 -
- Number of teams: 7

Regular season
- First place: DESTIL Trappers Tilburg

National Championships
- Champions: DESTIL Trappers Tilburg

Eredivisie seasons
- ← 2012-13 2014–15 →

The 2013–14 Eredivisie season is the 54th season of the Eredivisie ice hockey league. Six Dutch teams and one Belgian team are taking part in the season.

In the months following the 2012-2013 season, the Amsterdam G's dropped out of the league after a troubled year financially and a last-place record. The Dordrecht Lions, perennial competitors in the Dutch amateur level "First Division" (Eerste Divisie) joined the league to bring the total number of teams back to seven.

The traditional first game (known as the "Ron Berteling Bowl"), was played on 30 September between the winner of the Dutch Cup and the winner of the Dutch championship from the previous year. The 7-team, 36-game regular season will be followed by a playoff of the top 4 teams (a best-of five semi-final and a best-of-five final).

== Regular season ==
	Club	GP	W	OTW	OTL	L	GF	GA	Pts
1.	(Netherlands) DESTIL Trappers Tilburg	36	30	2	0	4	216	64	64
2.	(Netherlands) HYS The Hague	36	25	1	5	5	215	106	57
3.	(Netherlands) UNIS Flyers Heerenveen	36	23	3	1	9	168	81	53
4.	(Belgium) HYC Herentals	36	14	2	3	17	159	181	55
5.	(Netherlands) Dordrecht Lions	36	15	1	0	20	153	192	32
6.	(Netherlands) Noptra Eaters Geleen	36	6	0	2	28	86	256	12*
7.	(Netherlands) Eindhoven Kemphanen	36	2	2	0	32	91	208	8

(*) The Noptra Eaters Geleen had two points deducted.

== Playoffs ==
Semifinals
1	DESTIL Trappers Tilburg	4
4	HYC Herentals	1
2	HYS The Hague	4
3	UNIS Flyers Heerenveen	3

Final
1	DESTIL Trappers Tilburg	4
2	HYS The Hague	2
