= North Sea Cup =

Belgian–Dutch hockey league, 2010–2012

The North Sea Cup was a short-lived hockey league that temporarily succeeded the Dutch Eredivisie from 2010 to 2012. It was the only professional ice hockey league in the Netherlands and the highest level of competition sanctioned by the Nederlandse IJshockey Bond (NIJB; English: "Dutch Ice Hockey Federation") and sanctioned by the Royal Belgian Ice Hockey Federation during the years that it operated.

It was created in 2010 when two top Belgian teams joined the six remaining teams of the Dutch professional league, called the "Eredivisie". In 2012, the Eredivisie was revived and the North Sea Cup tournament was disbanded, after the Dutch league admitted one of the Belgian teams of the North Sea Cup, HYC Herentals, as a full member. However, the concept of a mixed Dutch-Belgian hockey league was revived in 2015 with the formation of the BeNe League.

The North Sea Cup was also the name of the trophy given out to the league champion. HYS The Hague was the trophy winner for both years that the league was in operation.

North Sea Cup Teams for 2011-2012

== Teams ==
The teams of the North Sea Cup in 2011-2012 were:

Team	City	Arena
Eindhoven Kemphanen	Eindhoven	IJssportcentrum Eindhoven (cap. 1,700)
HYS The Hague	The Hague	de Uithof (cap. 2,610)
Geleen Eaters	Sittard-Geleen	Glanerbrook (cap. 1,200)
Friesland Flyers	Heerenveen	Thialf (cap. 3,500)
Destil Trappers	Tilburg	IJssportcentrum Tilburg (cap. 2,500)
HYC Herentals	Herentals	Bloso Ijsbaan (cap. 1,200)
Amsterdam Capitals	Amsterdam	Jaap Eden Hal (cap. 1,300)
IHC Leuven	Leuven	Ijs Baan Leuven

Leuven Chiefs announced that they would not be participating in the 2012-2013 North Sea Cup seasons, for financial reasons and to concentrate on youth development.

== Format ==
The North Sea Cup was both the name of the league and the trophy won by the league champion. In its first year, it consisted of a 36-game tournament with the top-placing team winning the cup. In its second year, )the league/tournament was pared down to a 14-game regular season, with a one-game playoff between the top two teams to determine the North Sea Cup champion.

The North Sea Cup teams also participated in the respective Dutch Cup and Belgian Cup tournaments, which were played prior to or concurrently with the North Sea Cup tournament.

The North Sea Cup tournament also established the rankings for the respective playoff tournaments for the Dutch National Championships and the Belgian National Championships.

== History ==
The Dutch ice hockey Eredivisie was formed after World War II, with teams in Amsterdam, The Hague and Tilburg. It suspended operations from 1950 to 1964, but has organized a season of competition annually ever since. Over the years the number of teams competing fluctuated between 3 and 10 (currently 8), and the number of games played in the regular season between 4 and 36. The league featured a mix of Dutch, European and overseas players.

For the 2008-2009 Eredivisie season, the Utrecht Dragons and Eindhoven Kemphanen joined the league. In 2009-2010, Utrecht returned to the Eerste Divisie. Prior to the 2010-2011 season, Amstel Tijgers, one of the oldest teams in the league, dropped out, as did Groningen Grizzlies after three seasons, due to poor results on the ice and low revenues. In 2010, a new team, the Zoetermeer Panthers, won the Dutch Cup but dropped out of the first North Sea Cup tournament due to financial problems.

Prior to the 2010-2011 season, the top five Belgian teams competed in an Elite Series. These teams tended to have a smaller budget and fewer imported players than the top Dutch teams. In 2010, the Belgian Elite Series disbanded when two of its teams, HYC Herentals and White Caps Turnhout, joined the Dutch Eredivisie, which was renamed the "North Sea Cup".

For the second season of the North Sea Cup (2011-2012), one newly formed Dutch team (Amsterdam Capitals) and one former Belgian Elite Series team (Leuven Chiefs) took part in the league. White Caps Turnhout dropped out of the league midway through the season due to a large number of injured and departing players—their games did not count in the final standings. The second season of the North Sea Cup was shortened to a home-and-home round-robin among all the teams of the league, the same format as the Dutch and Belgian Cup tournament.

== Other leagues ==
In the Netherlands, below the North Sea Cup was the Eerste Divisie (First Division), the country's top amateur ice hockey league. There was no relegation or promotion between the North Sea Cup and the Eerste Divisie, although some cities (such as Tilburg, Amsterdam and The Hague) had a professional team in the North Sea Cup and a separate but similarly-named amateur team in the Eerste Divisie. All other Dutch hockey leagues are recreational leagues.

In Belgium, the Belgian National League operated as an amateur league one tier below the North Sea Cup. Belgian National League teams competed with North Sea Cup teams for the Belgian Cup, but only the Belgian North Sea Cup teams were eligible to win the National Championships.

== Champions ==
The champions of the league's major trophies during its existence:

Year	Belgian Cup	Dutch Cup	North Sea Cup	Belgian Championship	Dutch Championship
2011-2012	HYC Herentals	HYS The Hague	HYS The Hague	HYC Herentals	Ruijters Eaters Geleen
2010-2011	White Caps Turnhout	Tilburg Trappers	HYS The Hague	White Caps Turnhout	HYS The Hague
