= 1985–86 Eredivisie (ice hockey) season =

Dutch ice hockey season

The 1985–86 Eredivisie season was the 26th season of the Eredivisie, the top level of ice hockey in the Netherlands. Nine teams participated in the league, and G.IJ.S. Groningen won the championship.

== First round ==
	Club	GP	W	T	L	GF	GA	Pts
1.	G.IJ.S. Groningen	16	10	2	4	87	60	22
2.	Tilburg Trappers	16	9	2	5	97	78	20
3.	Eaters Geleen	16	9	1	6	95	70	19
4.	Heerenveen Flyers	16	7	4	5	75	76	18
5.	Eindhoven Kemphanen	16	7	4	5	93	80	18
6.	Amstel Tijgers Amsterdam	16	7	2	7	68	64	16
7.	Nijmegen Tigers	16	7	1	8	81	70	15
8.	H.H.IJ.C. Den Haag	16	5	1	10	63	102	11
9.	S.IJ. Den Bosch	16	1	3	12	61	121	5

== Final round ==
	Club	GP	W	T	L	GF	GA	Pts
1.	G.IJ.S. Groningen	8	7	0	1	48	29	14
2.	Eaters Geleen	8	6	0	2	46	28	12
3.	Eindhoven Kemphanen	8	3	0	5	38	42	6
4.	Heerenveen Flyers	8	3	0	5	33	49	6
5.	Tilburg Trappers	8	1	0	7	33	50	2
