= 1993–94 Eredivisie (ice hockey) season =

Dutch ice hockey season

The 1993–94 Eredivisie season was the 34th season of the Eredivisie, the top level of ice hockey in the Netherlands. 10 teams participated in the league, and the Tilburg Trappers won the championship.

== Regular season ==
| | Club | GP | W | T | L | GF | GA | Pts |
|---|---|---|---|---|---|---|---|---|
| 1. | Eaters Geleen | 18 | 18 | 0 | 0 | 242 | 21 | 36 |
| 2. | Nijmegen Tigers | 18 | 14 | 0 | 4 | 142 | 48 | 26 |
| 3. | Rotterdam Panda’s | 18 | 13 | 0 | 5 | 135 | 44 | 26 |
| 4. | Tilburg Trappers | 18 | 13 | 0 | 5 | 154 | 45 | 26 |
| 5. | IJ.H.C. Assen | 18 | 9 | 1 | 8 | 76 | 133 | 19 |
| 6. | Dordrecht Lions | 18 | 8 | 1 | 9 | 90 | 123 | 17 |
| 7. | S.IJ. Den Bosch | 18 | 5 | 1 | 12 | 56 | 134 | 11 |
| 8. | H.H.IJ.C. Den Haag | 18 | 4 | 0 | 14 | 65 | 150 | 8 |
| 9. | Utrecht Rheem Racers | 18 | 3 | 0 | 15 | 45 | 177 | 6 |
| 10. | Eindhoven Kemphanen | 18 | 1 | 1 | 16 | 50 | 180 | 3 |

== Final round ==
| | Club | GP | W | T | L | GF | GA | Pts (Bonus) |
|---|---|---|---|---|---|---|---|---|
| 1. | Eaters Geleen | 12 | 10 | 0 | 2 | 72 | 36 | 24(4) |
| 2. | Nijmegen Tigers | 12 | 6 | 1 | 5 | 59 | 59 | 16(3) |
| 3. | Rotterdam Panda’s | 12 | 6 | 1 | 5 | 53 | 48 | 14(1) |
| 4. | Tilburg Trappers | 12 | 1 | 0 | 11 | 24 | 65 | 4(2) |

== Playoffs ==
Semi-finals
Rotterdam Panda’s | 0
Eaters Geleen | 4
Tilburg Trappers | 3
Nijmegen Tigers | 0

Final
Eaters Geleen | 2
Tilburg Trappers | 4
Third place
not played

== Relegation ==
| | Club | GP | W | T | L | GF | GA | Pts |
|---|---|---|---|---|---|---|---|---|
| 1. | IJ.H.C. Assen | 14 | 12 | 1 | 1 | 118 | 41 | 25 |
| 2. | Eindhoven Kemphanen | 14 | 9 | 1 | 4 | 90 | 50 | 19 |
| 3. | Heerenveen Flyers | 14 | 9 | 0 | 5 | 59 | 45 | 18 |
| 4. | Dordrecht Lions | 14 | 8 | 1 | 5 | 88 | 57 | 17 |
| 5. | S.IJ. Den Bosch | 14 | 8 | 0 | 6 | 60 | 57 | 14 |
| 6. | H.H.IJ.C. Den Haag | 14 | 6 | 1 | 7 | 77 | 78 | 13 |
| 7. | Utrecht Rheem Racers | 14 | 2 | 0 | 12 | 44 | 98 | 2 |
| 8. | Warriors Leeuwarden | 14 | 0 | 0 | 14 | 31 | 141 | 0 |
