= 2010–11 Eredivisie (ice hockey) season =

Dutch ice hockey season

The 2010-11 Eredivisie season was the 51st season of the Eredivisie, the top level of ice hockey in the Netherlands. Six teams participated in the league, and HYS The Hague won the championship. The playoff seeding was determined by the teams' performances in the 2010–11 North Sea Cup season.

== Quarterfinals ==
- Nijmegen Devils - Eindhoven Kemphanen 2-1 (3-4, 7-1, 6-2)
- Heerenveen Flyers - Geleen Smoke Eaters 0-2 (0-3, 3-4)

== Semifinals ==
- HYS The Hague - Geleen Smoke Eaters 3-0 (8-0, 8-1, 4-1)
- Tilburg Trappers - Nijmegen Devils 3-1 (8-6, 5-2, 4-5, 4-2)

== Final ==
- HYS The Hague - Tilburg Trappers 4-1 (6-4, 4-2, 5-1, 2-7, 5-4)
