= 2024–25 Central European Hockey League season =

2024–25 Central European Hockey League
- League: Central European Hockey League
- Sport: Ice hockey
- Duration: 27 September 2024 – 29 March 2025
- Number of games: CEHL Cup: 79; Regular season: 72; Postseason: 23
- Number of teams: 9

Regular season
- Best record: EHC Die Bären Neuwied
- Runners-up: Snackpoint Eaters Limburg

Playoffs
- Finals champions: EHC Die Bären Neuwied
- Runners-up: Snackpoint Eaters Limburg

Central European Hockey League seasons
- ← 2023–24 2025–26 →

The 2024–25 Central European Hockey League season was the 10th season of play for the league and first under its new moniker since changing from the BeNe League. The CEHL Cup preliminary ran from 27 September to 8 December 2024 with EHC Die Bären Neuwied finishing atop the standings. The CEHL Cup playoff ran from 13 December 2024 to 14 January 2025. The Snackpoint Eaters Limburg defeated EHC Die Bären Neuwied 4 to 7 for the Cup. The regular season ran from 20 December 2024 to 4 March 2025 with EHC Die Bären Neuwied finishing atop the standings. The postseason ran from 7 March to 29 March, 2025. The EHC Die Bären Neuwied defeated the Snackpoint Eaters Limburg 3 games to 2 for the league championship.

== Teams ==
2024–25 CEHL team map

| Team | City | Arena | Coach |
|---|---|---|---|
| EG Diez-Limburg Rockets | (Germany) Diez | Eissporthalle Diez | (Germany) Uli Egen (Germany) Nils Krämer |
| Snackpoint Eaters Limburg | (Netherlands) Geleen | Glanerbrook Ijshal | (Finland) Matias Lehtonen (Netherlands) Jeffrey van Iersel |
| UltimAir Hijs Hokij Den Haag | (Netherlands) The Hague | De Uithof | (Belgium) Kristoff van den Broeck |
| UNIS Flyers Heerenveen | (Netherlands) Heerenveen | Thialf IJsstadion | (Canada) Mike Nason |
| Heylen Vastgoed HYC | (Belgium) Herentals | Bloso Centrum Netepark | (Belgium) Joris Peusens |
| IHC Leuven Chiefs | (Belgium) Leuven | IJsbaan Leuven | (Switzerland) Pascal Ryser |
| Bulldogs Liège | (Belgium) Liège | Patinoire de Liège | (Germany) Guido Lamberti-Charles |
| Mechelen Golden Sharks | (Belgium) Mechelen | Ice Skating Center Mechelen | (Belgium) Gilbert Paelinck |
| EHC Die Bären Neuwied | (Germany) Neuwied | Ice House Neuwied | (Czech Republic) Alexej Sulak |

== CEHL Cup ==
=== Preliminary ===
| Pos | Team | Pld | W | OTW | OTL | L | GF | GA | GD | Pts | Qualification |
|---|---|---|---|---|---|---|---|---|---|---|---|
| 1 | EHC Die Bären Neuwied | 16 | 12 | 0 | 0 | 4 | 83 | 51 | +32 | 36 | Qualified for Cup Semifinals |
| 2 | Snackpoint Eaters Limburg | 16 | 10 | 1 | 2 | 3 | 65 | 45 | +20 | 34 | Qualified for Cup Semifinals |
| 3 | EG Diez-Limburg Rockets | 16 | 9 | 2 | 0 | 5 | 64 | 50 | +14 | 31 | Qualified for Cup Semifinals |
| 4 | Bulldogs Liège | 16 | 8 | 2 | 1 | 5 | 59 | 48 | +11 | 29 | Qualified for Cup Semifinals |
| 5 | UNIS Flyers Heerenveen | 16 | 6 | 1 | 1 | 8 | 58 | 57 | +1 | 21 | |
| 6 | IHC Leuven Chiefs | 16 | 6 | 0 | 2 | 8 | 48 | 61 | −13 | 20 | |
| 7 | Heylen Vastgoed HYC | 16 | 4 | 3 | 2 | 7 | 55 | 66 | −11 | 20 | |
| 8 | UltimAir Hijs Hokij Den Haag | 16 | 5 | 1 | 2 | 8 | 65 | 54 | +11 | 19 | |
| 9 | Mechelen Golden Sharks | 16 | 1 | 1 | 1 | 13 | 40 | 105 | −65 | 6 | |

Updated to match(es) played on unknown. Source: Home Page
Rules for classification: 1) Points; 2) Head-to-head points.

=== CEHL Cup playoffs ===
Semifinals (best-of-3)
1 | EHC Die Bären Neuwied | 8 | 1 | 5
4 | Bulldogs Liège | 0 | 4 | 0
2 | Snackpoint Eaters Limburg | 5 | 3 | 6
3 | EG Diez-Limburg Rockets | 6 | 1 | 1

Championship (best-of-1)
1 | EHC Die Bären Neuwied | 4
2 | Snackpoint Eaters Limburg | 7

Note: * denotes overtime

== Regular season ==
=== Standings ===
| Pos | Team | Pld | W | OTW | OTL | L | GF | GA | GD | Pts | Qualification |
|---|---|---|---|---|---|---|---|---|---|---|---|
| 1 | EHC Die Bären Neuwied | 16 | 12 | 0 | 1 | 3 | 78 | 47 | +31 | 37 | Qualified for Quarterfinals |
| 2 | Snackpoint Eaters Limburg | 16 | 10 | 3 | 0 | 3 | 77 | 41 | +36 | 36 | Qualified for Quarterfinals |
| 3 | Bulldogs Liège | 16 | 10 | 1 | 1 | 4 | 72 | 47 | +25 | 33 | Qualified for Quarterfinals |
| 4 | UltimAir Hijs Hokij Den Haag | 16 | 8 | 0 | 1 | 7 | 64 | 63 | +1 | 25 | Qualified for Quarterfinals |
| 5 | Heylen Vastgoed HYC | 16 | 7 | 1 | 1 | 7 | 56 | 56 | 0 | 24 | Qualified for Quarterfinals |
| 6 | EG Diez-Limburg Rockets | 16 | 6 | 0 | 1 | 9 | 47 | 56 | −9 | 19 | Qualified for Quarterfinals |
| 7 | IHC Leuven Chiefs | 16 | 5 | 1 | 0 | 10 | 64 | 78 | −14 | 17 | Qualified for Quarterfinals |
| 8 | UNIS Flyers Heerenveen | 16 | 4 | 1 | 2 | 9 | 54 | 59 | −5 | 16 | Qualified for Quarterfinals |
| 9 | Mechelen Golden Sharks | 16 | 3 | 0 | 0 | 13 | 43 | 108 | −65 | 9 | |

Updated to match(es) played on unknown. Source: Home Page
Rules for classification: 1) Points; 2) Head-to-head points.

=== Statistics ===
==== Scoring leaders ====
Note: scoring totals include points accrued in CEHL Cup preliminary games.

| Player | Team | Pos | GP | G | A | Pts | PIM |
|---|---|---|---|---|---|---|---|
| (Belgium) Bryan Kolodziejczyk | Bulldogs Liège | C/LW | 30 | 24 | 41 | 65 | 8 |
| (Belgium) Mitch Morgan | Heylen Vastgoed HYC | LW/RW | 31 | 16 | 45 | 61 | 11 |
| (Canada) Erik Miller | IHC Leuven Chiefs | C/RW | 32 | 26 | 33 | 59 | 30 |
| (Canada) Jérémy Côté | IHC Leuven Chiefs | LW | 32 | 22 | 37 | 59 | 16 |
| (Canada) Ben Duperreault | Snackpoint Eaters Limburg | LW | 32 | 35 | 22 | 57 | 8 |
| (Latvia) Oļegs Šišļaņņikovs | Heylen Vastgoed HYC | LW | 24 | 29 | 28 | 57 | 39 |
| (Finland) Matias Mustonen | UltimAir Hijs Hokij Den Haag | C/W | 32 | 26 | 31 | 57 | 4 |
| (Finland) Tuukka Rajamäki | UNIS Flyers Heerenveen | C/LW | 31 | 31 | 23 | 54 | 12 |
| (United States) Jeff Smith | EHC Die Bären Neuwied | C/W | 31 | 26 | 28 | 54 | 22 |
| (Finland) Roope Niskanen | Heylen Vastgoed HYC | F | 28 | 29 | 24 | 53 | 4 |

== Playoffs ==
=== Championship ===
Quarterfinals (best-of-3)
1 | EHC Die Bären Neuwied | 4 | 3** | -
8 | UNIS Flyers Heerenveen | 1 | 2 | -
4 | UltimAir Hijs Hokij Den Haag | 4 | 4 | -
5 | Heylen Vastgoed HYC | 3 | 3 | -
2 | Snackpoint Eaters Limburg | 7 | 3 | -
7 | IHC Leuven Chiefs | 2 | 1 | -
3 | Bulldogs Liège | 4 | 1 | 2
6 | EG Diez-Limburg Rockets | 1 | 4 | 4

Semifinals (best-of-5)
1 | EHC Die Bären Neuwied | 6 | 1 | 5 | 4 | -
4 | UltimAir Hijs Hokij Den Haag | 4 | 5 | 3 | 1 | -
2 | Snackpoint Eaters Limburg | 2 | 2 | 5 | 4** | 5
6 | EG Diez-Limburg Rockets | 3 | 3 | 1 | 3 | 3

Championship (best-of-5)
1 | EHC Die Bären Neuwied | 2 | 3 | 2 | 5 | 5
2 | Snackpoint Eaters Limburg | 1 | 4 | 4 | 2 | 4

Note: * denotes overtime
Note: ** denotes overtime and shootout
