= 1979–80 Eredivisie (ice hockey) season =

Dutch ice hockey season

The 1979–80 Eredivisie season was the 20th season of the Eredivisie, the top level of ice hockey in the Netherlands. Ten teams participated in the league, and the Heerenveen Flyers won the championship.

== First round ==
	Club	GP	W	T	L	GF	GA	Pts
1.	Amstel Tijgers Amsterdam	18	15	1	2	116	61	31
2.	Heerenveen Flyers	18	13	4	1	138	51	30
3.	Nijmegen Tigers	18	11	2	5	99	76	24
4.	G.IJ.S. Groningen	18	10	3	5	102	76	23
5.	H.H.IJ.C. Den Haag	18	10	1	7	123	88	21
6.	Tilburg Trappers	18	7	2	9	101	102	16
7.	Olympia Heist op den Berg	18	7	1	10	121	119	15
8.	S.IJ. Den Bosch	18	6	3	9	88	100	15
9.	Utrecht Rheem Racers	18	1	1	16	81	170	3
10.	Eaters Geleen	18	1	0	17	60	186	2

== Final round ==
	Club	GP	W	T	L	GF	GA	Pts
1.	Heerenveen Flyers	6	5	1	0	38	17	11
2.	Amstel Tijgers Amsterdam	6	2	2	2	27	30	6
3.	G.IJ.S. Groningen	6	1	2	3	34	37	4
4.	Nijmegen Tigers	6	0	3	3	23	38	3
