= 1984–85 Eredivisie (ice hockey) season =

Dutch ice hockey season

The 1984–85 Eredivisie season was the 25th season of the Eredivisie, the top level of ice hockey in the Netherlands. Ten teams participated in the league, and the Amstel Tijgers Amsterdam won the championship.

== First round ==
| | Club | GP | W | T | L | GF | GA | Pts |
|---|---|---|---|---|---|---|---|---|
| 1. | Amstel Tijgers Amsterdam | 36 | 28 | 2 | 6 | 275 | 99 | 58 |
| 2. | Heerenveen Flyers | 36 | 28 | 1 | 7 | 265 | 132 | 57 |
| 3. | Nijmegen Tigers | 36 | 27 | 1 | 8 | 281 | 129 | 55 |
| 4. | G.IJ.S. Groningen | 36 | 27 | 1 | 8 | 289 | 136 | 55 |
| 5. | Tilburg Trappers | 36 | 15 | 3 | 18 | 201 | 175 | 33 |
| 6. | S.IJ. Den Bosch | 36 | 13 | 3 | 20 | 180 | 170 | 29 |
| 7. | Eindhoven Kemphanen | 36 | 13 | 1 | 22 | 177 | 201 | 27 |
| 8. | H.H.IJ.C. Den Haag | 36 | 11 | 2 | 23 | 171 | 236 | 24 |
| 9. | Eaters Geleen | 36 | 11 | 0 | 25 | 190 | 253 | 22 |
| 10. | Utrecht Rheem Racers | 36 | 0 | 0 | 36 | 100 | 598 | 0 |

== Final round ==
| | Club | GP | W | T | L | GF | GA | Pts |
|---|---|---|---|---|---|---|---|---|
| 1. | Amstel Tijgers Amsterdam | 6 | 4 | 0 | 2 | 23 | 17 | 8 |
| 2. | Nijmegen Tigers | 6 | 3 | 0 | 3 | 25 | 24 | 6 |
| 3. | G.IJ.S. Groningen | 6 | 3 | 0 | 3 | 24 | 27 | 6 |
| 4. | Heerenveen Flyers | 6 | 2 | 0 | 4 | 27 | 31 | 4 |
