= Ron Berteling Schaal =

The Ron Berteling Schaal has been held as the opening game of the Eredivisie season since 2007. It is contested by the previous season's Eredivisie and Dutch Cup champions (or the cup finalist, if a team won both the league and the cup).

The game is named after Ron Berteling, the most-capped player for the Dutch national ice hockey team.

== Winners ==
The cup champion (or finalist) is the home team, while the Eredivisie winner is the away team.

Date	Home team	Score	Periods	Away team
9/29/2007	Amstel Tijgers	4-5	2–0, 2–3, 0-2	Tilburg Trappers
10/4/2008	Heerenveen Flyers *	1-9	0–2, 1–7, 0-0	Tilburg Trappers
9/18/2009	Nijmegen Devils	5-6	1-1, 3–4, 1-1	HYS The Hague
9/19/2010	Ruijters Eaters Geleen	5-8	2–3, 2–3, 1-2	Nijmegen Devils
9/25/2011	Tilburg Trappers	6-4	0–1, 3–2, 3-1	HYS The Hague
9/30/2012	HYS The Hague	3-2 OT	1-1, 1–0, 0–1, 1-0	Ruijters Eaters Geleen

(* Was cup finalist.)
