= 1980–81 Eredivisie (ice hockey) season =

Dutch ice hockey season

The 1980–81 Eredivisie season was the 21st season of the Eredivisie, the top level of ice hockey in the Netherlands. Nine teams participated in the league, and the Heerenveen Flyers won the championship.

== Regular season ==
	Club	GP	W	T	L	GF	GA	Pts
1.	Amstel Tijgers Amsterdam	32	23	5	4	277	118	51
2.	Nijmegen Tigers	32	21	3	8	202	112	45
3.	Tilburg Trappers	32	20	3	9	218	131	43
4.	Heerenveen Flyers	32	18	6	8	194	137	42
5.	S.IJ. Den Bosch	32	12	6	14	167	176	32
6.	G.IJ.S. Groningen	32	13	5	14	171	136	31
7.	Aquatherm Assen	32	12	2	18	163	182	26
8.	Utrecht Rheem Racers	32	8	1	23	144	205	17
9.	Eaters Geleen	32	0	1	31	76	415	1

== Playoffs ==
Semi-finals
Nijmegen Tigers	1
Tilburg Trappers	3
Amstel Tijgers Amsterdam	1
Heerenveen Flyers	3

Final
Tilburg Trappers	0
Heerenveen Flyers	3
Third place
not held
