= 1973–74 Eredivisie (ice hockey) season =

Dutch ice hockey season

The 1973–74 Eredivisie season was the 14th season of the Eredivisie, the top level of ice hockey in the Netherlands. Six teams participated in the league, and the Tilburg Trappers won the championship. H.H.IJ.C. Den Haag finished first, but the title was awarded To Tilburg, as Den Haag used an ineligible player.

== Regular season ==
	Club	GP	W	T	L	GF	GA	Pts
1.	H.H.IJ.C. Den Haag	10	8	1	1	88	27	17
2.	Tilburg Trappers	10	8	0	2	85	37	16
3.	Eaters Geleen	10	6	0	4	62	53	12
4.	HC Hijs	10	5	0	5	58	59	10
5.	Nijmegen Tigers	10	1	1	8	36	86	3
6.	Heerenveen Flyers	10	1	0	9	42	109	2
