= 1970–71 Eredivisie (ice hockey) season =

Dutch ice hockey season

The 1970–71 Eredivisie season was the 11th season of the Eredivisie, the top level of ice hockey in the Netherlands. Five teams participated in the league, and the Tilburg Trappers won the championship. The Smoke Eaters Geleen finished first, tied with Tilburg, but the title was awarded to Tilburg due to the Smoke Eaters Geleen using ineligible players.

== Regular season ==
	Club	GP	W	T	L	GF	GA	Pts
1.	Eaters Geleen	8	7	0	1	78	17	14
2.	Tilburg Trappers	8	7	0	1	74	32	14
3.	H.H.IJ.C. Den Haag	8	3	0	5	50	45	6
4.	S.IJ. Den Bosch	8	3	0	5	34	16	6
5.	HC Rotterdam	8	0	0	8	8	104	0
