= 1975–76 Eredivisie (ice hockey) season =

Dutch ice hockey season

The 1975–76 Eredivisie season was the 16th season of the Eredivisie, the top level of ice hockey in the Netherlands. Eight teams participated in the league, and the Tilburg Trappers won the championship.

== Regular season ==
	Club	GP	W	T	L	GF	GA	Pts
1.	Tilburg Trappers	14	13	1	0	116	38	27
2.	H.H.IJ.C. Den Haag	14	8	2	4	86	74	18
3.	Amstel Tijgers Amsterdam	14	7	1	6	99	81	15
4.	Utrecht Hunters	14	7	1	6	78	69	15
5.	G.IJ.S. Groningen	14	5	2	7	62	77	12
6.	S.IJ. Den Bosch	14	4	2	8	59	106	10
7.	Nijmegen Tigers	14	4	1	9	76	87	9
8.	Heerenveen Flyers	14	3	0	11	64	108	4*

- (* The Heerenveen Flyers had two points deducted)
