= 1999–2000 Eredivisie (ice hockey) season =

Dutch ice hockey season

The 1999–00 Eredivisie season was the 40th season of the Eredivisie, the top level of ice hockey in the Netherlands. Seven teams participated in the league, and the Nijmegen Tigers won the championship.

== First round ==
	Club	GP	W	OTW	OTL	L	GF	GA	Pts
1.	Nijmegen Tigers	18	11	2	0	5	86	63	37
2.	Tilburg Trappers	18	9	2	3	4	90	57	34
3.	Heerenveen Flyers	18	10	2	2	4	78	56	33*
4.	Amstel Tijgers Amsterdam	18	7	2	3	6	70	73	28
5.	Eaters Geleen	18	7	1	1	9	81	85	24
6.	S.IJ. Den Bosch	18	3	3	1	11	56	91	16
7.	H.IJ.S. Hoky Den Haag	18	4	0	2	12	61	97	14

- (* The Heerenveen Flyers had three points deducted)

== Final round ==
	Club	GP	W	OTW	OTL	L	GF	GA	Pts (Bonus)
1.	Nijmegen Tigers	6	4	0	0	2	26	15	15(3)
2.	Tilburg Trappers	6	3	0	0	3	19	16	11(2)
3.	Heerenveen Flyers	6	3	0	1	2	22	27	11(1)
4.	Amstel Tijgers Amsterdam	6	1	1	0	4	18	27	5(0)

== Playoffs ==
Semi-finals
Nijmegen Tigers	4
Amstel Tijgers Amsterdam	1
Tilburg Trappers	4
Heerenveen Flyers	0

Final
Nijmegen Tigers	4
Tilburg Trappers	1
Third place
not held
