= 1981–82 Eredivisie (ice hockey) season =

Dutch ice hockey season

The 1981–82 Eredivisie season was the 22nd season of the Eredivisie, the top level of ice hockey in the Netherlands. Eight teams participated in the league, and the Heerenveen Flyers won the championship.

== First round ==
	Club	GP	W	T	L	GF	GA	Pts
1.	Heerenveen Flyers	28	24	0	4	223	88	48
2.	Nijmegen Tigers	28	19	2	7	172	113	40
3.	Amstel Tijgers Amsterdam	28	17	3	8	166	116	37
4.	Tilburg Trappers	28	16	1	11	153	111	33
5.	H.H.IJ.C. Den Haag	28	11	3	14	134	121	25
6.	S.IJ. Den Bosch	28	10	3	15	117	163	23
7.	DLJ Leeuwarden	28	5	1	22	116	256	11
8.	Eindhoven Kemphanen	28	3	1	24	87	200	7

== Final round ==
	Club	GP	W	T	L	GF	GA	Pts
1.	Heerenveen Flyers	12	11	0	1	100	34	22
2.	Nijmegen Tigers	12	5	1	6	69	74	11
3.	Amstel Tijgers Amsterdam	12	4	2	6	55	76	10
4.	Tilburg Trappers	12	1	3	8	42	82	5
