= 1978–79 Eredivisie (ice hockey) season =

Dutch ice hockey season

The 1978–79 Eredivisie season was the 19th season of the Eredivisie, the top level of ice hockey in the Netherlands. Ten teams participated in the league, and the Heerenveen Flyers won the championship.

== First round ==
	Club	GP	W	T	L	GF	GA	Pts
1.	Heerenveen Flyers	18	14	2	2	128	70	30
2.	Amstel Tijgers Amsterdam	18	12	2	4	123	73	26
3.	Tilburg Trappers	18	9	5	4	99	63	23
4.	G.IJ.S. Groningen	18	11	1	6	91	76	23
5.	HC Leiden	18	8	3	7	89	99	19
6.	Olympia Nederhorst	18	8	1	9	139	135	17
7.	H.H.IJ.C. Den Haag	18	7	2	9	118	105	16
8.	Nijmegen Tigers	18	4	4	10	75	87	12
9.	S.IJ. Den Bosch	18	3	2	13	60	133	8
10.	Utrecht Rheem Racers	18	2	2	14	74	155	6

== Final round ==
	Club	GP	W	T	L	GF	GA	Pts
1.	Heerenveen Flyers	6	5	0	1	33	22	10
2.	G.IJ.S. Groningen	6	3	0	3	29	31	6
3.	Tilburg Trappers	6	2	0	4	24	32	4
4.	Amstel Tijgers Amsterdam	6	2	0	4	21	32	4
