= 1994–95 Eredivisie (ice hockey) season =

Dutch ice hockey season

The 1994–95 Eredivisie season was the 35th season of the Eredivisie, the top level of ice hockey in the Netherlands. Seven teams participated in the league, and the Tilburg Trappers won the championship.

== Regular season ==
	Club	GP	W	T	L	GF	GA	Pts
1.	Tilburg Trappers	24	22	1	1	220	52	45
2.	Eaters Geleen	24	17	2	5	189	74	36
3.	Nijmegen Tigers	24	17	1	6	118	92	35
4.	Eindhoven Kemphanen	24	13	1	10	124	136	27
5.	Rotterdam Panda’s	24	7	0	17	98	151	14
6.	Heerenveen Flyers	24	2	2	20	70	159	6
7.	Dordrecht Lions	24	2	1	21	68	223	5

== Playoffs ==
Semi-finals
Tilburg Trappers	3
Eindhoven Kemphanen	0
Eaters Geleen	3
Nijmegen Tigers	1

Final
Tilburg Trappers	3
Eaters Geleen	0
Third place
not held
