= 1976–77 Eredivisie (ice hockey) season =

Dutch ice hockey season

The 1976–77 Eredivisie season was the 17th season of the Eredivisie, the top level of ice hockey in the Netherlands. Seven teams participated in the league, and the Heerenveen Flyers won the championship.

== Regular season ==
	Club	GP	W	T	L	GF	GA	Pts
1.	Heerenveen Flyers	24	19	0	5	175	121	38
2.	Tilburg Trappers	24	16	2	6	139	64	34
3.	H.H.IJ.C. Den Haag	24	14	1	9	162	117	29
4.	Nijmegen Tigers	24	11	1	12	119	132	23
5.	Amstel Tijgers Amsterdam	24	11	1	12	161	145	23
6.	G.IJ.S. Groningen	24	9	1	14	127	154	19
7.	Utrecht Hunters	24	1	0	23	96	246	0*

- (* The Utrecht Hunters had two points deducted)
