= 1974–75 Eredivisie (ice hockey) season =

Dutch ice hockey season

The 1974–75 Eredivisie season was the 15th season of the Eredivisie, the top level of ice hockey in the Netherlands. Six teams participated in the league, and the Tilburg Trappers won the championship.

== Regular season ==
	Club	GP	W	T	L	GF	GA	Pts
1.	Tilburg Trappers	10	10	0	0	96	33	20
2.	Nijmegen Tigers	10	6	1	3	55	46	13
3.	H.H.IJ.C. Den Haag	10	5	2	3	64	49	12
4.	Eaters Geleen	10	5	0	5	51	60	10
5.	Amstel Tijgers Amsterdam	10	1	1	8	50	83	3
6.	Heerenveen Flyers	10	1	0	9	49	94	2
