= 1945–46 Eredivisie (ice hockey) season =

Dutch ice hockey season

The 1945–46 Eredivisie season was the first season of the Eredivisie, the top level of ice hockey in the Netherlands. The Dutch Cup had previously been played in 1938 and 1939, before being disrupted by World War II. Three teams participated in the league, and H.H.IJ.C Den Haag won the championship.
