= 1983–84 Eredivisie (ice hockey) season =

Dutch ice hockey season

The 1983–84 Eredivisie season was the 24th season of the Eredivisie, the top level of ice hockey in the Netherlands. Six teams participated in the league, and the Nijmegen Tigers won the championship.

== Regular season ==
	Club	GP	W	T	L	GF	GA	Pts
1.	Heerenveen Flyers	10	8	0	2	65	36	16
2.	Nijmegen Tigers	10	7	0	3	52	30	14
3.	Tilburg Trappers	10	6	0	4	52	37	12
4.	Amstel Tijgers Amsterdam	10	5	0	5	48	39	10
5.	G.IJ.S. Groningen	10	3	0	7	39	65	6
6.	Eaters Geleen	10	1	0	9	38	87	2

== Playoffs ==
=== Semifinals ===
- Heerenveen Flyers - Eaters Geleen 2:0 on series
- Nijmegen Tigers - G.IJ.S. Groningen 2:0 on series
- Tilburg Trappers - Amstel Tijgers Amsterdam 2:1 on series

=== Final round ===
	Club	GP	W	T	L	GF	GA	Pts
1.	Nijmegen Tigers	8	6	0	2	49	25	12
2.	Heerenveen Flyers	8	4	0	4	38	48	8
3.	Tilburg Trappers	8	2	0	6	34	48	4
