= 1977–78 Eredivisie (ice hockey) season =

Dutch ice hockey season

The 1977–78 Eredivisie season was the 18th season of the Eredivisie, the top level of ice hockey in the Netherlands. Six teams participated in the league, and the Heerenveen Flyers won the championship.

== First round ==
	Club	GP	W	T	L	GF	GA	Pts
1.	G.IJ.S. Groningen	20	15	0	5	114	86	30
2.	Tilburg Trappers	20	14	1	5	106	54	29
3.	Heerenveen Flyers	20	12	1	7	119	75	25
4.	Amstel Tijgers Amsterdam	20	10	1	9	100	98	21
5.	H.H.IJ.C. Den Haag	20	4	0	16	71	120	8
6.	Nijmegen Tigers	20	3	1	16	69	146	7

== Final round ==
	Club	GP	W	T	L	GF	GA	Pts
1.	Heerenveen Flyers	6	4	0	2	29	24	8
2.	G.IJ.S. Groningen	6	4	0	2	31	23	8
3.	Tilburg Trappers	6	3	0	3	27	26	6
4.	Amstel Tijgers Amsterdam	6	1	0	5	22	36	2
