= Eerste Divisie (ice hockey) =

Ice hockey league

The Eerste Divisie ('First Division') is the second level ice hockey league in the Netherlands. A semi-professional league, the Eerste Divisie is directly below the professional BeNe League. Before the BeNe League was founded by Dutch and Belgian teams in 2015, the Eerste Divisie was the second level below the professional Eredivisie. With the creation of the binational BeNe League, the Eerste Divisie became the highest national ice hockey league in the Netherlands.

Several Eerste Divisie teams are the secondary or developmental squads of BeNe League teams and often play out of the same arenas as their BeNe League affiliates.

Since 2012, Eerste Divisie teams compete for the Dutch Cup with teams from the BeNe League and, previously, from the Eredivisie. However, they were not eligible for the title of national champions, as the national championship was determined by the Eredivisie playoffs.

== 2018–19 season ==
Location of Eerste Divisie teams for the 2018–19 season.

=== Teams ===
- Amsterdam Tigers
- Capitals Leeuwarden
- Devils Nijmegen II
- Dordrecht Lions
- Kemphanen Eindhoven
- GIJS Groningen
- Flyers Heerenveen II
- Hijs Hokij Den Haag II
- Red Eagles 's-Hertogenbosch
- Smoke Eaters Geleen II
- Tilburg Trappers II
- Zoetermeer Panters II
