= 1965–66 Eredivisie (ice hockey) season =

Ice hockey championship

The 1965–66 Eredivisie season was the sixth season of the Eredivisie, the top level of ice hockey in the Netherlands. Five teams participated in the league, and HYS Den Haag won the championship.

== Regular season ==
	Club	GP	W	T	L	GF	GA	Pts
1.	H.H.IJ.C. Den Haag	8	8	0	0	105	24	16
2.	T.IJ.S.C. Tilburg	8	6	0	2	114	36	12
3.	Amstel Tijgers Amsterdam	8	4	0	4	60	43	8
4.	IJ.H.C. Deventer	8	1	1	6	19	126	3
5.	HC Rotterdam	8	0	1	7	11	80	1
