= 1947–48 Eredivisie (ice hockey) season =

Dutch ice hockey season

The 1947–48 Eredivisie season was the third season of the Eredivisie, the top level of ice hockey in the Netherlands. Four teams participated in the league, and H.H.IJ.C. Den Haag won the championship. Ryan Bowden was the top scorer in the season.

== Regular season ==
	Club	GP	W	T	L	GF	GA	Pts
1.	H.H.IJ.C. Den Haag I	6	5	1	0	39	8	11
2.	T.IJ.S.C. Tilburg	6	3	1	2	18	23	7
3.	A.IJ.H.C. Amsterdam	6	2	1	3	19	21	5
4.	H.H.IJ.C. Den Haag II	6	0	1	5	7	32	1
