= 2010–11 North Sea Cup season =

2010–11 North Sea Cup
- League: North Sea Cup
- Sport: Ice hockey
- Duration: November 5 - March 30
- Teams: 8

Regular season
- North Sea Cup Champions: HYS The Hague
- Runners-up: Tilburg Trappers
- Top scorer: Phil Aucoin (HYS The Hague)

National Championships
- Champions: Dutch: HYS The Hague; Belgian: White Caps Turnhout
- Runners-up: Dutch: Tilburg Trappers; Belgian: HYC Herentals

Eredivisie seasons
- ← 2009-10 2011–12 →

The 2010–11 North Sea Cup was the inaugural season of the North Sea Cup, which succeeded the Dutch Eredivisie as the highest level of ice hockey competition in the Netherlands. Two former Belgian Elite Series teams, HYC Herentals and White Caps Turnhout, participated with the six remaining teams of the Dutch Eredivisie after Amstel Tijgers and Groningen Grizzlies dropped out before the season began and the new Zoetermeer Panthers team dropped out at the beginning of the season.

The 8-team, 28-game regular season ended with HYS The Hague finishing first overall, while the two Belgian teams struggled initially and finished seventh and eighth. The six Dutch teams participated in the Dutch National Championships with HYS The Hague winning the championship over Tilburg Trappers. The two Belgian teams, as the only teams playing in the top league sanctioned by the Royal Belgian Ice Hockey Federation, played their own series against each other to determine the Belgian champion, with Turnhout beating Herentals.

== Regular season ==
Standings
Club	GP	W	OTW	OTL	L	GF	GA	P
HYS The Hague	28	23	0	0	5	194	79	69
Tilburg Trappers	28	19	0	1	8	120	70	58
Heerenveen Flyers	28	15	4	0	9	118	105	53
Nijmegen Devils	28	16	1	1	10	133	115	51
Eindhoven Kemphanen	28	11	2	2	13	109	106	39
Geleen Eaters	28	10	2	2	14	105	127	36
White Caps Turnhout	28	5	0	1	22	76	146	16
HYC Herentals	28	4	0	2	22	89	188	14
