= 1946–47 Eredivisie (ice hockey) season =

Dutch ice hockey season

The 1946–47 Eredivisie season was the second season of the Eredivisie, the top level of ice hockey in the Netherlands. Three teams participated in the league, and T.IJ.S.C. Tilburg won the championship.

== Regular season ==
	Club	GP	W	T	L	GF	GA	Pts
1.	T.IJ.S.C. Tilburg	4	3	0	1	14	13	6
2.	H.H.IJ.C. Den Haag	4	3	0	1	23	5	6
3.	A.IJ.H.C. Amsterdam	4	0	0	4	7	20	0
