= 1998–99 Eredivisie (ice hockey) season =

Dutch ice hockey season

The 1998–99 Eredivisie season was the 39th season of the Eredivisie, the top level of ice hockey in the Netherlands. Six teams participated in the league, and the Nijmegen Tigers won the championship.

== First round ==
	Club	GP	W	OTW	OTL	L	GF	GA	Pts
1.	Nijmegen Tigers	20	16	1	0	3	105	58	50
2.	Amstel Tijgers Amsterdam	20	13	1	3	3	96	59	44
3.	Tilburg Trappers	20	12	2	0	6	96	63	40
4.	Heerenveen Flyers	20	8	1	1	10	72	72	27
5.	Phantoms Deurne	20	3	0	1	16	69	120	10
6.	H.IJ.S. Hoky Den Haag	20	2	1	1	16	72	138	9

== Final round ==
	Club	GP	W	OTW	OTL	L	GF	GA	Pts (Bonus)
1.	Nijmegen Tigers	6	4	1	0	1	33	21	17(3)
2.	Tilburg Trappers	6	3	1	1	1	22	21	13(1)
3.	Amstel Tijgers Amsterdam	6	1	1	2	2	18	23	9(2)
4.	Heerenveen Flyers	6	1	0	0	5	14	22	3(0)

== Playoffs ==
Semi-finals
Nijmegen Tigers	4
Heerenveen Flyers	1
Tilburg Trappers	2
Amstel Tijgers Amsterdam	4

Final
Nijmegen Tigers	4
Amstel Tijgers Amsterdam	2
Third place
not held
