= 2001–02 Eredivisie (ice hockey) season =

Dutch ice hockey season

The 2001–02 Eredivisie season was the 42nd season of the Eredivisie, the top level of ice hockey in the Netherlands. Five teams participated in the league, and the Boretti Tigers Amsterdam won the championship.

== Regular season ==
=== Phase 1 ===
| | Club | GP | W | OTW | OTL | L | GF | GA | Pts |
|---|---|---|---|---|---|---|---|---|---|
| 1. | Tilburg Trappers | 8 | 7 | 1 | 0 | 0 | 37 | 13 | 23 |
| 2. | Boretti Tigers Amsterdam | 8 | 3 | 1 | 2 | 2 | 28 | 27 | 13 |
| 3. | Heerenveen Flyers | 8 | 2 | 2 | 0 | 4 | 25 | 21 | 10 |
| 4. | Eaters Geleen | 8 | 3 | 0 | 0 | 5 | 32 | 47 | 5 |
| 5. | Nijmegen Tigers | 8 | 1 | 0 | 2 | 5 | 28 | 42 | 5 |

=== Phase 2 ===
| | Club | GP | W | OTW | OTL | L | GF | GA | Pts |
|---|---|---|---|---|---|---|---|---|---|
| 1. | Heerenveen Flyers | 8 | 4 | 2 | 1 | 1 | 32 | 27 | 17 |
| 2. | Eaters Geleen | 8 | 3 | 2 | 0 | 3 | 30 | 30 | 13 |
| 3. | Tilburg Trappers | 8 | 4 | 0 | 0 | 4 | 31 | 23 | 12 |
| 4. | Nijmegen Tigers | 8 | 3 | 0 | 1 | 4 | 29 | 36 | 10 |
| 5. | Boretti Tigers Amsterdam | 8 | 2 | 0 | 2 | 4 | 24 | 30 | 8 |

=== Phase 3 ===
| | Club | GP | W | OTW | OTL | L | GF | GA | Pts |
|---|---|---|---|---|---|---|---|---|---|
| 1. | Tilburg Trappers | 8 | 4 | 1 | 0 | 3 | 35 | 23 | 14 |
| 2. | Eaters Geleen | 8 | 3 | 0 | 3 | 2 | 33 | 42 | 12 |
| 3. | Boretti Tigers Amsterdam | 8 | 3 | 1 | 1 | 3 | 31 | 32 | 12 |
| 4. | Nijmegen Tigers | 8 | 3 | 1 | 0 | 4 | 33 | 34 | 11 |
| 5. | Heerenveen Flyers | 8 | 3 | 1 | 0 | 4 | 33 | 34 | 11 |

=== Phase 4 ===
| | Club | GP | W | OTW | OTL | L | GF | GA | Pts (Bonus) |
|---|---|---|---|---|---|---|---|---|---|
| 1. | Boretti Tigers Amsterdam | 16 | 9 | 3 | 1 | 3 | 72 | 48 | 39(5) |
| 2. | Tilburg Trappers | 16 | 6 | 5 | 0 | 5 | 66 | 49 | 38(10) |
| 3. | Heerenveen Flyers | 16 | 5 | 0 | 5 | 6 | 56 | 70 | 26(6) |
| 4. | Eaters Geleen | 16 | 5 | 0 | 2 | 9 | 51 | 70 | 24(7) |
| 5. | Nijmegen Tigers | 16 | 6 | 1 | 1 | 8 | 64 | 72 | 23(2) |

== Playoffs ==
Semi-finals
Tilburg Trappers | 1
Heerenveen Flyers | 3
Eaters Geleen | 0
Boretti Tigers Amsterdam | 3

Final
Heerenveen Flyers | 0
Boretti Tigers Amsterdam | 3
Third place
not held
