= 2008–09 Eredivisie (ice hockey) season =

2008–09 Eredivisie
- League: Eredivisie
- Sport: Ice hockey
- Number of teams: 10
- TV partner(s): RTL

Regular season
- Champions: Tilburg Trappers
- Runners-up: HYS The Hague

Playoffs

Finals
- Champions: HYS The Hague
- Runners-up: Tilburg Trappers

Eredivisie seasons
- ← 2007–08 2009–10 →

The 2008–09 Eredivisie was the 49th season of the Eredivisie, the highest level of ice hockey competition in the Netherlands. The season started in November, following the completion of the league cup, won by the Tilburg Trappers.

With the addition of the Utrecht Dragons and the Groningen Grizzlies, ten teams participated (a record for the Eredivisie). The season consisted of 24 games. The Utrecht Dragons fared poorly in their first and only season, folding its professional team at the end of the season.

The top eight teams qualified for the playoffs. In the best-of-three quarterfinals, Tilburg beat Eindhoven 2-0, The Hague beat Amsterdam 2-0, Geleen beat Groningen 2-0, and Nijmegen beat Heerenveen 2-1. In the best-of-five semifinals, Tilburg beat Nijmegen 3-2 and The Hague beat Geleen 3-0. HYS The Hague won its first national championship since 1969 by beating Tilburg in the best-of-five finals 3 games to 2.

== Regular season ==
	Club	GP	W	OTW	OTL	L	GF	GA	Pts
1.	Tilburg Trappers	24	18	1	0	5	142	78	56
2.	HYS The Hague	24	14	3	2	5	107	72	50
3.	Eaters Geleen	24	11	3	2	8	96	89	41
4.	Nijmegen Devils	24	12	2	1	9	92	83	39*
5.	Heerenveen Flyers	24	11	1	2	10	87	79	37
6.	Groningen Pecoma Grizzlies	24	10	2	0	12	77	90	34
7.	Amstel Tijgers Amsterdam	24	8	1	5	10	85	82	31
8.	Eindhoven Kemphanen	24	8	1	2	13	82	100	28
9.	Utrecht Dragons	24	2	0	0	22	69	164	6

- (* The Nijmegen Devils had two points deducted)

== Playoffs ==
Quarter-finals
Tilburg Trappers	2
Eindhoven Kemphanen	0
Nijmegen Devils	2
Heerenveen Flyers	1
HYS The Hague	2
Amstel Tijgers Amsterdam	0
Geleen Eaters	2
Groningen Pecoma Grizzlies	0

Semi-finals
Tilburg Trappers	3
Nijmegen Devils	2
HYS The Hague	3
Eaters Geleen	0

Final
Tilburg Trappers	2
HYS The Hague	3
