= 1982–83 Eredivisie (ice hockey) season =

Dutch ice hockey season

The 1982–83 Eredivisie season was the 23rd season of the Eredivisie, the top level of ice hockey in the Netherlands. Four teams participated in the league, and the Heerenveen Flyers won the championship.

== Regular season ==
	Club	GP	W	T	L	GF	GA	Pts
1.	Heerenveen Flyers	12	9	2	1	78	40	20
2.	Nijmegen Tigers	12	8	1	3	69	35	17
3.	H.H.IJ.C. Den Haag	12	2	2	8	53	73	6
4.	Tilburg Trappers	12	2	1	9	31	83	5
