= 2012–13 Eredivisie (ice hockey) season =

2012–13 Eredivisie Season
- League: North Sea Cup
- Sport: Ice hockey
- Duration: 30 Sept. 2012 - 19 March 2013
- Number of teams: 7

Regular season
- First place: HYS The Hague
- Runners-up: Tilburg Trappers
- Top scorer: Matt Crowell, Herentals

National Championships
- Champions: HYS The Hague
- Runners-up: Tilburg Trappers

Eredivisie seasons
- ← 2011-12 2013–14 →

The 2012–13 Eredivisie season was the 53rd season of the Eredivisie ice hockey league, and the first since the disbanding of the North Sea Cup and the reversion to the league's original name. Six Dutch teams and one Belgian team took part in the season.

When the Leuven Chiefs withdrew from the North Sea Cup at the end of the 2011–2012 season, only one Belgian team, HYC Herentals, remained in the mixed Dutch/Belgian tournament. It was decided to dispense with the North Sea Cup, reinstate the Dutch Eredivisie regular season, and admit HYC Herentals to the Eredivisie. Thus in 2012–2013, Herentals was the sole Belgian team to compete for the Dutch national championship (although Herentals still competed for the Belgian Cup).

Also new for the 2012–2013 season was the change of name of the Amsterdam team from "Amsterdam Capitals" the "Amsterdam G's" after finding a title sponsor.

The traditional first game (known as the "Ron Berteling Bowl"), was played on September 30 between the winner of the Dutch Cup and the winner of the Dutch championship from the previous year. The 7-team, 36-game regular season was followed by a playoff of the top 4 teams (a best-of five semi-final and a best-of-five final). HYS The Hague was both the top team in the regular season and the Dutch national champions after sweeping both rounds of the playoffs.

== Regular season ==
Standings
Club	GP	W	OTW	OTL	L	GF	GA	P
HYS The Hague	36	26	4	1	5	207	91	87
Tilburg Trappers	36	25	2	3	6	198	93	82
Friesland Flyers	36	21	2	3	10	138	97	70
Geleen Eaters	36	16	5	0	15	136	126	58
HYC Herentals	36	12	0	4	20	155	190	40
Eindhoven Kemphanen	36	10	1	3	22	122	161	35
Amsterdam G's	36	2	0	0	34	72	270	6

== National Championship Playoffs ==
Semi-finals
1	HYS The Hague	3
4	Geleen Eaters	0
2	Tilburg Trappers	3
3	Friesland Flyers	0

Final
1	HYS The Hague	3
2	Tilburg Trappers	0
