= 1949–50 Eredivisie (ice hockey) season =

Dutch ice hockey season

The 1949–50 Eredivisie season was the fourth season of the Eredivisie, the top level of ice hockey in the Netherlands. Three teams participated in the league, and Ijsvogels Amsterdam won the championship.

== Regular season ==
	Club	GP	W	T	L	GF	GA	Pts
1.	A.IJ.H.C. Amsterdam	4	3	0	1	34	14	6
2.	H.H.IJ.C. Den Haag	4	2	1	1	15	16	5
3.	T.IJ.S.C. Tilburg	4	0	1	3	9	28	1
