= 1964–65 Eredivisie (ice hockey) season =

Dutch ice hockey season

The 1964–65 Eredivisie season was the fifth season of the Eredivisie, the top level of ice hockey in the Netherlands. It was the first time the league had been held since 1949–50. Five teams participated in the league, and HYS Den Haag won the championship.

== Regular season ==
	Club	GP	W	T	L	GF	GA	Pts
1.	H.H.IJ.C. Den Haag	8	8	0	0	125	6	16
2.	T.IJ.S.C. Tilburg	8	6	0	2	77	46	12
3.	Amstel Tijgers Amsterdam	8	4	0	4	50	44	8
4.	HC Rotterdam	8	1	1	6	11	75	3
5.	IJ.H.C. Deventer	8	0	1	7	7	99	1
