= Silverdome (disambiguation) =

The Pontiac Silverdome was an American stadium formerly home to the Detroit Lions and Pistons.

Silverdome may also refer to:

- Silverdome (Launceston) a sporting and entertainment venue in Launceston, Tasmania, Australia
- PWA Silverdome in Zoetermeer, The Netherlands
