= 2007–08 Eredivisie (ice hockey) season =

Dutch ice hockey season

The 2007–08 Eredivisie season was the 48th season of the Eredivisie, the top level of ice hockey in the Netherlands. Seven teams participated in the league, and the Tilburg Trappers won the championship.

== Regular season ==
	Club	GP	W	OTW	OTL	L	GF	GA	Pts
1.	Tilburg Trappers	24	20	1	0	3	132	58	62
2.	Heerenveen Flyers	24	18	1	1	4	119	53	57
3.	HYS The Hague	24	14	2	2	6	122	76	48
4.	Eaters Geleen	24	11	1	1	11	102	69	36
5.	Amstel Tijgers Amsterdam	24	8	1	3	12	95	106	29
6.	Nijmegen Devils	24	3	2	1	18	45	107	14
7.	Groningen Pecoma Grizzlies	24	1	1	1	21	61	207	6

== Playoffs ==
Semifinals
1	Tilburg Trappers	4
4	Eaters Geleen	2
2	Heerenveen Flyers	4
3	HYS The Hague	1

Final
1	Tilburg Trappers	3
2	Heerenveen Flyers	0
