= Jaap Edenhal =

Indoor ice rink in Amsterdam, the Netherlands

Coordinates: 52.349916°N 4.944223°E

Jaap Edenhal (sometimes anglicized as Jaap Eden Hall) is a 4,500-capacity indoor ice rink located adjacent to Jaap Eden baan in Amsterdam, Netherlands. It is named after Dutch speed skater Jaap Eden. The Amsterdam Tigers are its primary tenant. The facility opened in 1973 and has also been used as a concert venue.

The Jaap Edenhal was created by rebuilding the hockey rink next to the track. In addition to being the home rink of the Amsterdam Tigers of the BeNe League, and formerly the home of the Amsterdam G's in the now defunct Eredivise, the Jaap Edenhal was used for the national ice-skating championships in 1974. It has also hosted fleamarkets, exhibitions, a Saturday night disco skate popular with teenagers, the Amsterdam Skate Festival (including roller-disco) and in particular concerts. Artists that have performed at the venue include ABBA, Marvin Gaye, Bob Marley, Rod Stewart, Siouxsie and the Banshees, John Denver, Iron Maiden, Olivia Newton-John, Dio, Run-DMC (their first appearance in the Netherlands), and The Police. In 1986, it was listed by Billboard as one of the major concert venues in the country. Eric Clapton and Muddy Waters in 1978.
