= Amsterdam G's =

- Founded: 2011
- Based in: Amsterdam, Netherlands
- Arena: Jaap Edenhal
- Colours: Red, Black
- Head coach: Ron Berteling

Amsterdam G's was a semi-professional ice hockey team in Amsterdam, Netherlands. It was founded in 2011 by the group that formerly operated the Amstel Tijgers before it ceased operations in 2010. The team played at the Jaap Edenhal. It participated in the Dutch Cup and the defunct Eredivise league. They were known in their first year of operations as the "Amsterdam Capitals", but changed names after finding a corporate sponsor in 2012. The team was coached by Ron Berteling.

== North Sea Cup/Eredivisie results ==
Note: GP = Games played, W = Wins, OTW = Overtime Wins, OTL = Overtime Losses, L = Losses, GF = Goals for, GA = Goals against, Pts = Points

Season	GP	W	OTW	OTL	L	GF	GA	Pts	Finish	Playoffs
2012-13	36	2	0	0	34	72	270	6	7th, Eredivisie	Did not qualify
2011–12	14	1	0	1	12	34	106	4	8th, North Sea Cup	Lost qtr.final round-robin to Geleen and Eindhoven (1W-7L)
