= Central European Hockey League =

Belgian-Dutch ice hockey league

- Sport: Ice hockey
- Founded: 2015; 11 years ago
- Founder: Royal Belgian Ice Hockey Federation & Netherlands Ice Hockey Association
- President: Danny Micola van Furstenrecht
- No. of teams: 9
- Country: Belgium (4 teams); Netherlands (3 teams); Germany (2 teams)
- Continent: Europe
- Most recent champion: Heylen Vastgoed HYC (2nd)
- Most titles: Heylen Vastgoed HYC (2)
- Related competitions: Belgian Hockey League; Eredivisie; North Sea Cup
- Website: www.cehl.eu/

The Central European Hockey League (formerly: BeNe League/Beneliga) is the highest-level professional ice hockey league in Belgium and the Netherlands from 2015. The league was founded in 2015 as BeNe League/Beneliga, following a merger between the Belgian Hockey League and the Dutch Eredivisie and thus became the top tier of the sport in both nations. In terms of league structure, the BeNe League is made up of 11 teams, 6 from the Netherlands and a further 5 from Belgium, and they all play in a single group. The league featured a mix of Belgian, Dutch, European and overseas players. In 2023 two German clubs joined the league.

== Overview ==
Teams currently in the BeNeLiga (Clubs:: Dutch,: Belgian) .

The Central European Hockey League is made up of 13 teams, 6 based in the Netherlands, 5 based in Belgium and 2 based in Germany. In the first season, the league comprised 16 teams (10 from the Netherlands and 6 from Belgium). These 16 teams were split into two groups, each containing 5 Dutch teams and 3 Belgian teams. Each team played a total of 22 games over the course of the regular season, they played each team in their division twice, as well as once against every team in the other division. Points are awarded in the following fashion, 3 points for a win, 2 for a win in overtime and 1 for an overtime loss.

At the end of the regular season, the top 4 teams from each division qualified for the playoffs. The playoff quarterfinals were played over two legs, whilst the semi-finals and final were both played as a best of three series. The winner of the playoffs was then crowned the league victor. On top of this, the league also crowns National Champions from each country. The team that advances the furthest through the playoffs from each country is subsequently crowned as National Champion.

One team of the Netherlands most successful ice hockey teams, the Tilburg Trappers, announced that they would not be a part of the BeNe League, and would instead join the Oberliga, the 3rd tier of ice hockey in Germany. They do however, operate a developmental team in the BeNe League in the form of Tilburg Trappers II.

== History ==
Following the 2009 season of the Belgian Hockey League, HYC Herentals and White Caps Turnhout decided to the join the Eredivisie, whilst the remaining 3 teams dropped down a division and played instead in the Belgian National League. This resulted in the North Sea Cup being played in place of both the Belgian Hockey League and the Eredivisie. Following the culmination of the 2011–12 season, in which White Caps Turnhout dropped out midway through the season, followed by the Leuven Chiefs also stating they would be leaving the competition, it was announced that the Eredivisie would once again take place, and that HYC Herentals would participate. A reformed Belgian Hockey League, featuring both Leuven Chiefs, White Caps Turnhout, and former Belgian National League teams would also take place.

The Geleen Eaters released a statement via their website stating they were unsure if they would be able to compete in the 2014/15 Eredivisie due to lack of funding, which is an issue that also occurred the previous year. On August 26, 2014, Geleen stated that in order to participate in the upcoming season they would have to raise somewhere in the region of €60,000.

This was soon followed by an announcement that the Dordrecht Lions would be dropping down to the Eerst Divisie, and it was subsequently reported in September 2014 that the Eredivisie was in a state of Crisis due to the fact that the league was reduced to five participants. Furthermore, one of those five teams, Eindhoven Kemphanen, declared that they had no interest playing in a five team league, which potentially reduced the Eredivisie down to four teams for the 2014/15 season.

Eindhoven Kemphanen subsequently agreed to play in a 5 team league, which also featured Geleen Eaters, HYC Herentals, Heerenveen Flyers and Tilburg Trappers, and as a result the Eredivisie went ahead.

Following the difficulties both leagues had suffered in the recent years, the hockey federations of both nations worked in partnership, and on 12 June 2015, it was announced that the Belgian Hockey League and the Eredivisie would merge in to the BeNe League.

On 13 March 2016, it was announced that GIJS Groningen would be joining the BeNe League from the Eerst Divisie bringing the number of teams up to 17. It was subsequently announced on 16 June 2016 that the Dordrecht Lions would not be playing in the BeNe League for the upcoming season, instead dropping down a division to the Eerst Divisie. This means that the 2016–17 edition of the BeNe League is projected to stay at 16 teams. In 2024 it was renamed Central European Hockey League after two German clubs joined the league in 2023.

== Season format ==
In the main round, all 13 teams play a double round competition in the regular season. With this, each team will play 24 games.

The top eight participants from the main round qualify for the play-offs. Playoff quarterfinals and semi-finals will be played as best of three series whilst the final will be played as a best of five series with the winner being crowned as BeNe League Champion.

== Teams ==
(2019./20.):

Current Teams
Team	City	Arena	Capacity	Founded
Antwerp Phantoms	(Belgium) Deurne	IJsbaan Ruggerveld	500	1972
IHC Leuven	(Belgium) Leuven	IJsbaan Leuven	800	1993
UNIS Flyers	(Netherlands) Heerenveen	Thialf	3,500	1967
Hijs Hokij	(Netherlands) The Hague	De Uithof	2,610	1933
Herentals HYC	(Belgium) Herentals	BLOSO IJsbaan	1,200	1971
Bulldogs Liège	(Belgium) Liège	Patinoire de Liège	1,250	1997
Laco Eaters	(Netherlands) Geleen	Glanerbrook IJshal	1,200	1968
Mechelen Golden Sharks	(Belgium) Mechelen	Ice Skating Center Mechelen	1,000	2016
Nijmegen Devils	(Netherlands) Nijmegen	Triavium	1,450	2007
Tilburg Trappers Jeugd	(Netherlands) Tilburg	IJssportcentrum Tilburg	2,500	2009
Hotwings Panthers	(Netherlands) Zoetermeer	Silverdome	3,500	2010

=== Former teams ===
Former Teams
Team	City	Arena	Capacity	Founded	Joined BeNe	Left BeNe
Amsterdam Tigers	(Netherlands) Amsterdam	Jaap Edenhal	1,300	1963	2015–16	2019–20
Dordrecht Lions	(Netherlands) Dordrecht	Sportboulevard Dordrecht	1,500	1977	2015–16	2016–17
Eindhoven Kemphanen	(Netherlands) Eindhoven	IJssportcentrum Eindhoven	1,700	1981	2015–16	2017–18
GIJS Groningen	(Netherlands) Groningen	Sportcentrum Kardinge	800	1969	2016–17	2017–18
IJCU Dragons Utrecht	(Netherlands) Utrecht	De Vechtsebanen	4,000	2008	2015–16	Before 2015–16^{1}
Olympia Heist op den Berg	(Belgium) Heist-op-den-Berg	Die Swaene	N/A	1959	2015–16	2016–17
Red Eagles 's-Hertogenbosch	(Netherlands) 's-Hertogenbosch	Sportiom 's-Hertogenbosch	7,220	1965	2015–16	2017–18
Turnhout Tigers	(Belgium) Turnhout	Kempisch IJsstadion	1,200	1981	2015–16	2016–17

- ^{1} Utrecht withdrew their application in June 2015.

== Players ==
The Central European Hockey League relies heavily on Belgian and Dutch native players, and as a result the majority of players on the Belgian and Dutch national teams ply their trade in the Central European Hockey League.

Overseas players (termed imports) are allowed in the league however, with each team being able to sign two imports. An import is defined as any player who is not eligible to play for either the Belgian or Dutch national teams.

== Champions ==
Season	BeNe League Champion	Belgian Champion	Dutch Champion
2015–16	(Belgium) REPLAY HYC Herentals	REPLAY HYC Herentals	UNIS Flyers Heerenveen
2016–17	(Netherlands) UNIS Flyers Heerenveen	REPLAY HYC Herentals	UNIS Flyers Heerenveen
2017–18	(Netherlands) Hijs Hokij Den Haag	REPLAY HYC Herentals	UNIS Flyers Heerenveen
2018–19	(Belgium) REPLAY HYC Herentals	REPLAY HYC Herentals	Nijmegen Devils
