= 2005–06 Eredivisie (ice hockey) season =

46th season of top-level ice hockey in the Netherlands won by the Nijmegen Emperors

The 2005–06 Eredivisie season was the 46th season of the Eredivisie, the top level of ice hockey in the Netherlands. Six teams participated in the league, and the Nijmegen Emperors won the championship.

== Regular season ==
	Club	GP	W	OTW	OTL	L	GF	GA	Pts
1.	Amsterdam Bulldogs	20	14	1	0	5	85	60	44
2.	Heerenveen Flyers	20	12	1	3	4	92	56	41
3.	Eaters Geleen	20	8	5	2	5	84	71	36
4.	Nijmegen Emperors	20	6	4	2	8	79	83	28
5.	Tilburg Trappers	20	7	1	2	10	70	64	25
6.	H.IJ.S. Hoky Den Haag	20	2	0	2	16	54	130	6

== Playoffs ==
Semi-finals
Heerenveen Flyers	3
Eaters Geleen	1
Amsterdam Bulldogs	1
Nijmegen Emperors	3

Final
Heerenveen Flyers	2
Nijmegen Emperors	3
Third place
not held
