= 2011–12 North Sea Cup season =

2011–12 North Sea Cup
- League: North Sea Cup
- Sport: Ice hockey
- Duration: 2 December 2011 - 25 March 2012
- Teams: 8

Regular season
- North Sea Cup Champions: HYS The Hague
- Runners-up: Geleen Eaters
- Top scorer: TJ Caig (The Hague)

National Champions
- Champions: Dutch: Geleen Eaters; Belgian: HYC Herentals
- Runners-up: Dutch: HYS The Hague; Belgian: Leuven Chiefs

North Sea Cup seasons
- ← 2010-11 2012–13 →

The 2011–12 North Sea Cup was the second and final season of the North Sea Cup, the highest level of ice hockey in the Netherlands and Belgium, before the league reverted to its traditional name, the Eredivisie, and its traditional format.

== Teams ==
Teams participating in the league changed before and during the season. Prior to the start of the season, Nijmegen Devils announced a one-year hiatus from the North Sea Cup for 2011-2012. The Belgian team Leuven Chiefs moved from the Belgian National League up to the North Sea Cup for 2011-2012. An expansion team known as the "Amsterdam Capitals" joined the league, with many of the same people as the defunct Amstel Tijgers of the Dutch Eredivisie. White Caps Turnhout dropped out of the league midway through the season after it lost most of its players to injury and defections; games played against Turnhout will not be counted in the season standings.

At the end of the season, the Leuven Chiefs announced that they, too, were leaving the North Sea Cup tournament. The North Sea Cup was therefore disbanded and the last remaining Belgian team, HYC Herentals, was admitted as a full member of the "Eredivisie" Dutch league for the 2012-2013 season.

== Format ==
The format of the North Sea Cup was changed for the 2011-2012 season. The number of regular season games was reduced from 28 to 16, to allow for longer Belgian Cup and Dutch Cup tournaments which are played before the North Sea Cup. With the loss of Turnhout from the league, the season consisted of 14 games, as each of the eight teams played each other twice. HYS The Hague edged out Geleen Eaters on goal differential to win the North Sea Cup tournament, as both teams attained 36 points.

The standings of the Dutch teams in the North Sea Cup regular season determined the playoff pools for the quarter-final round of the Dutch National Championship playoffs. Pool A consisted of the Dutch team ranked first (The Hague), third (Tilburg) and fifth (Friesland), while Pool B consisted of the Dutch teams ranked second (Geleen), fourth (Eindhoven) and sixth (Amsterdam).

The Belgian national championships was determined among the two Belgian teams competing in the North Sea Cup, namely Herentals and Leuven, plus the team that dropped out, Turnhout. Herentals won all of the games of the round-robin and the finals against Leuven, winning the National Championship.

== Regular season ==
Standings
| Club | GP | W | OTW | OTL | L | GF | GA | P |
|---|---|---|---|---|---|---|---|---|
| HYS The Hague | 14 | 12 | 0 | 0 | 2 | 97 | 41 | 36 |
| Geleen Eaters | 14 | 12 | 0 | 0 | 2 | 72 | 36 | 36 |
| Tilburg Trappers | 14 | 11 | 0 | 0 | 3 | 80 | 36 | 33 |
| HYC Herentals | 14 | 5 | 2 | 0 | 7 | 58 | 71 | 19 |
| Eindhoven Kemphanen | 14 | 5 | 1 | 1 | 7 | 61 | 47 | 18 |
| Friesland Flyers | 14 | 5 | 0 | 1 | 8 | 52 | 63 | 16 |
| Leuven Chiefs | 14 | 1 | 1 | 1 | 11 | 26 | 85 | 6 |
| Amsterdam Capitals | 14 | 1 | 0 | 1 | 12 | 34 | 106 | 4 |

== Playoffs ==
Dutch Quarter-final Pool A Standings
| Club | GP | W | OTW | OTL | L | GF | GA | P |
|---|---|---|---|---|---|---|---|---|
| HYS The Hague | 8 | 5 | 2 | 0 | 1 | 45 | 21 | 25 |
| Tilburg Trappers | 8 | 5 | 0 | 1 | 2 | 37 | 25 | 20 |
| Friesland Flyers | 8 | 0 | 0 | 1 | 7 | 15 | 51 | 3 |

Dutch Quarter-final Pool B Standings
| Club | GP | W | OTW | OTL | L | GF | GA | P |
|---|---|---|---|---|---|---|---|---|
| Geleen Eaters | 8 | 6 | 1 | 0 | 1 | 54 | 27 | 25 |
| Tilburg Trappers | 8 | 4 | 0 | 1 | 3 | 47 | 27 | 16 |
| Amsterdam Capitals | 8 | 1 | 0 | 0 | 7 | 28 | 75 | 4 |

Dutch Championship Semi-Finals

- Geleen beats Tilburg 3 wins to none
- The Hague beats Eindhoven 3 wins to none

Dutch Championship Finals

- Geleen beats The Hague 3 wins to 2

Belgian Championship round-robin
| Club | GP | W | OTW | OTL | L | GF | GA | P |
|---|---|---|---|---|---|---|---|---|
| HYC Herentals | 8 | 8 | 0 | 0 | 0 | 61 | 12 | 27 |
| Leuven Chiefs | 7 | 3 | 0 | 0 | 4 | 25 | 38 | 10 |
| Turnhout White Caps | 7 | 0 | 0 | 0 | 7 | 11 | 47 | 1 |

Belgian Championship Finals

- HYC Herentals beats Leuven 3 wins to none
