= 2006–07 Eredivisie (ice hockey) season =

Dutch ice hockey season

The 2006–07 Eredivisie season was the 47th season of the Eredivisie, the top level of ice hockey in the Netherlands. Six teams participated in the league, and the Tilburg Trappers won the championship.

== Regular season ==
	Club	GP	W	OTW	OTL	L	GF	GA	Pts
1.	Eaters Geleen	20	14	0	1	5	101	60	43
2.	Tilburg Trappers	20	12	1	2	5	88	55	40
3.	Amstel Tijgers Amsterdam	20	8	2	4	6	70	77	32
4.	Heerenveen Flyers	20	8	3	0	9	80	78	30
5.	Nijmegen Emperors	20	6	2	2	10	66	76	24
6.	H.IJ.S. Calco Wolves	20	3	1	0	16	54	113	11

== Playoffs ==
Semi-finals
Tilburg Trappers	3
Amstel Tijgers Amsterdam	2
Eaters Geleen	0
Heerenveen Flyers	3

Final
Tilburg Trappers	3
Heerenveen Flyers	0
Third place
not held
