= EHC Neuwied =

EHC Die Bären Neuwied
- City: Neuwied, Germany
- League: Oberliga
- Founded: 1970
- Home arena: Icehouse Neuwied
- Colours: White, Blue, Silver
- Head coach: Bernd Arnold

EHC Neuwied is a professional ice hockey team in Neuwied, Germany. They play in the Oberliga, the third tier of ice hockey in Germany. The club was founded in 1979.

They played in the Oberliga, the third level of German ice hockey until 2016, and then in the fourth tier Regionalliga West which is organised by the North Rhine-Westphalia Ice Hockey Federation. After winning the league in 2023, the federation expelled the three teams from the league that were from outside North Rhine-Westphalia. Neuwied and EG Diez-Limburg switched to the Belgian-Dutch BeNe League for the 2023-24 season. In 2024 the BeNe League became the Central European Hockey League.

== Achievements ==
- Champion of the 2nd Bundesliga : 1997, 1998.
- Champion of the Regionalliga West: 2023
