= 2009–10 Eredivisie (ice hockey) season =

2009–10 Eredivisie
- League: Eredivisie
- Sport: Ice hockey
- Duration: November 13 – March 26
- Number of teams: 8

Regular season
- Champions: Nijmegen Devils
- Runners-up: HYS The Hague
- Top scorer: Daryl Bat (Destil Trappers)

Playoffs

Finals
- Champions: Nijmegen Devils
- Runners-up: HYS The Hague

Eredivisie seasons
- ← 2008–09 2010–11 →

The 2009–10 Eredivisie was the 50th season of the Eredivisie, the highest level of ice hockey competition in the Netherlands. The season started on November 13 following the quarterfinals of the league cup. Eight teams participated and played four times against each other in two home and two away games for a total of 28 league matches. The top six teams advanced to the playoffs with the top two teams receiving a bye into the semifinals. The Nijmegen Devils were the champions of both the regular season and playoffs.

== Regular season ==
Standings
Club	GP	W	OTW	OTL	L	GF	GA	P
Nijmegen Devils	28	18	3	3	4	128	80	63
HYS The Hague	28	18	0	2	8	134	72	56
Destil Trappers	28	17	1	2	8	135	66	55
Geleen Eaters	28	13	6	1	8	100	77	52
Heerenveen Flyers	28	15	2	2	9	125	88	51
Eindhoven Kemphanen	28	13	2	1	12	144	90	44
Amstel Tijgers	28	3	0	2	23	56	166	9
Groningen Grizzlies	28	1	0	1	26	87	223	4

== Playoffs ==
Quarter-finals
Geleen Eaters	2
Heerenveen Flyers	0
Tilburg Trappers	2
Eindhoven Kemphanen	1

Semi-finals
Nijmegen Devils	3
Geleen Eaters	2
HYS The Hague	2
Tilburg Trappers	3

Final
Nijmegen Devils	3
Tilburg Trappers	0
