= Netherlands Ice Hockey Association =

Highest governing body of ice hockey in the Netherlands

Netherlands
- Association name: IJshockey Nederland
- Founded: 1934
- IIHF membership: 20 January 1935
- President: Jan Hopstaken
- IIHF men's ranking: 28 (▼1) (26 May 2025)
- IIHF women's ranking: 16 (21 April 2025)

IJshockey Nederland (IJNL) is the official governing body of ice hockey in the Netherlands. It was founded as the Nederlandse IJshockey Bond (NIJB; 'Netherlands Ice Hockey Association') in 1933 as a three team league with The Hague, Amsterdam and Tilburg. It joined the International Ice Hockey Federation on 20 January, 1935. In 1946, it created the Eredivisie. The organisation’s name was changed from NIJB to IJNL in 2017.

It is now the governing body for four divisions: The North Sea Cup (formerly known as the Eredivisie ('Premier league'); professional); the Eerste Divisie ('First Division;' amateur); and the 2nd and 3rd divisions (recreational). It also governs the Dutch national men's ice hockey team, the Dutch national women's ice hockey team, the Dutch national men's junior ice hockey team and the Dutch national men's under 18 ice hockey team.

The professional tournaments that it organizes are currently the Bekercompetitie, a pre-season cup tournament held in the autumn among the top professional Dutch teams, and the North Sea Cup, a regular season that includes the 6 Eredivisie teams and three teams from Belgium. North Sea Cup standings determine the ranking for the playoffs for Dutch national championships. It also organizes the playoffs which determine the Dutch National Champions of ice hockey.

== See also ==
- Eredivisie (ice hockey)
