= Utrecht Dragons =

IJCU Dragons
- City: Utrecht, Netherlands
- Founded: 2008
- Home arena: De Vechtsebanen
- Colours: Red, black, white
- Head coach: Stefan Collard
- Website: ijcudragons.nl

IJCU Dragons Utrecht is a professional ice hockey team in Utrecht, Netherlands. The team played under the name "Hoek Dragons Utrecht" in the Dutch Eredivisie, the top professional hockey division in the Netherlands in 2008-09. In 2013, it ceased operations. However, the team was reborn in 2019, when they entered the Dutch "Eerste Divisie" (First Division) for the first time in 6 years, finishing with 8 wins, 10 losses, and 2 overtime losses. Home games are played at De Vechtsebanen.

== History ==
Utrecht has had an ice hockey club for many years, including teams named "Dragons". For 2008-2009, the team created a professional squad to compete in the Eredivisie, finishing with a record of 2 wins and 22 losses. They played in the Eerste divisie, the top amateur league in the Netherlands until January 2013, when a loss of players required them to forfeit the remainder of the season.

In March of 2019, rumours of a return were spoken of on social media. They held tryouts shortly thereafter to determine their selection for the following season. the team was reborn in 2019, when they entered the Dutch "Eerste Divisie" (First Division) for the first time in 6 years, finishing with 8 wins, 10 losses, and 2 overtime losses. After qualifying for the playoffs, Utrecht lost in the opening round to Yeti's Breda in two straight games. Long time player Ivo Beulen led the team in scoring for the season.

After playing only one game to start the 2020/2021, the First Division season was paused and later cancelled due to the ongoing Coronavirus pandemic. The team announced it would continue the following season, which is planned to start in September of 2021.

== Season results ==
Note: GP = Games played, W = Wins, OTW = Overtime Wins, OTL = Overtime Losses, L = Losses, GF = Goals for, GA = Goals against, Pts = Points

Season	GP	W	OTW	OTL	L	GF	GA	Pts	Finish	Playoffs
2008–09	24	2	0	0	22	69	164	6	9th, Eredivisie	Did not qualify

== Squad 2019/2020 ==
=== Goalies ===
- 75 Elaine Wilkes
- 60 Danny Gelder
- 1 Shane Sturkenboom

=== Defence ===
- 4 Geno Zwiers
- 5 Nigel Zwiers
- 6 Boris Sevo
- 7 Timo Verheul
- 8 Stein Martens
- 11 Vince Van de Kraak "C"
- 27 Kale Jewell
- 28 Jordie Wareham
- 29 Jerry Kinneging "A"
- 89 Bart Engel

=== Forwards ===
- 2 Tim Schaasberg
- 9 Justus Bos
- 10 Teun Landzaat
- 12 Indy Bontan
- 19 Nicky Collard
- 47 Kolton Dunwoody
- 66 Pieter Kronenburg
- 81 Mike Collard
- 94 Dylan Collard "A"
- 97 Andrew Trapman

=== Staff ===
- Stefan Collard, coach
- Dave Wilkes, trainer
- Maik Janssen, team manager
- Dennis Lodewijk, equipment
- Arnout Meinema, equipment

== Championships ==
None.
