= Mike Nason =

Ice hockey player

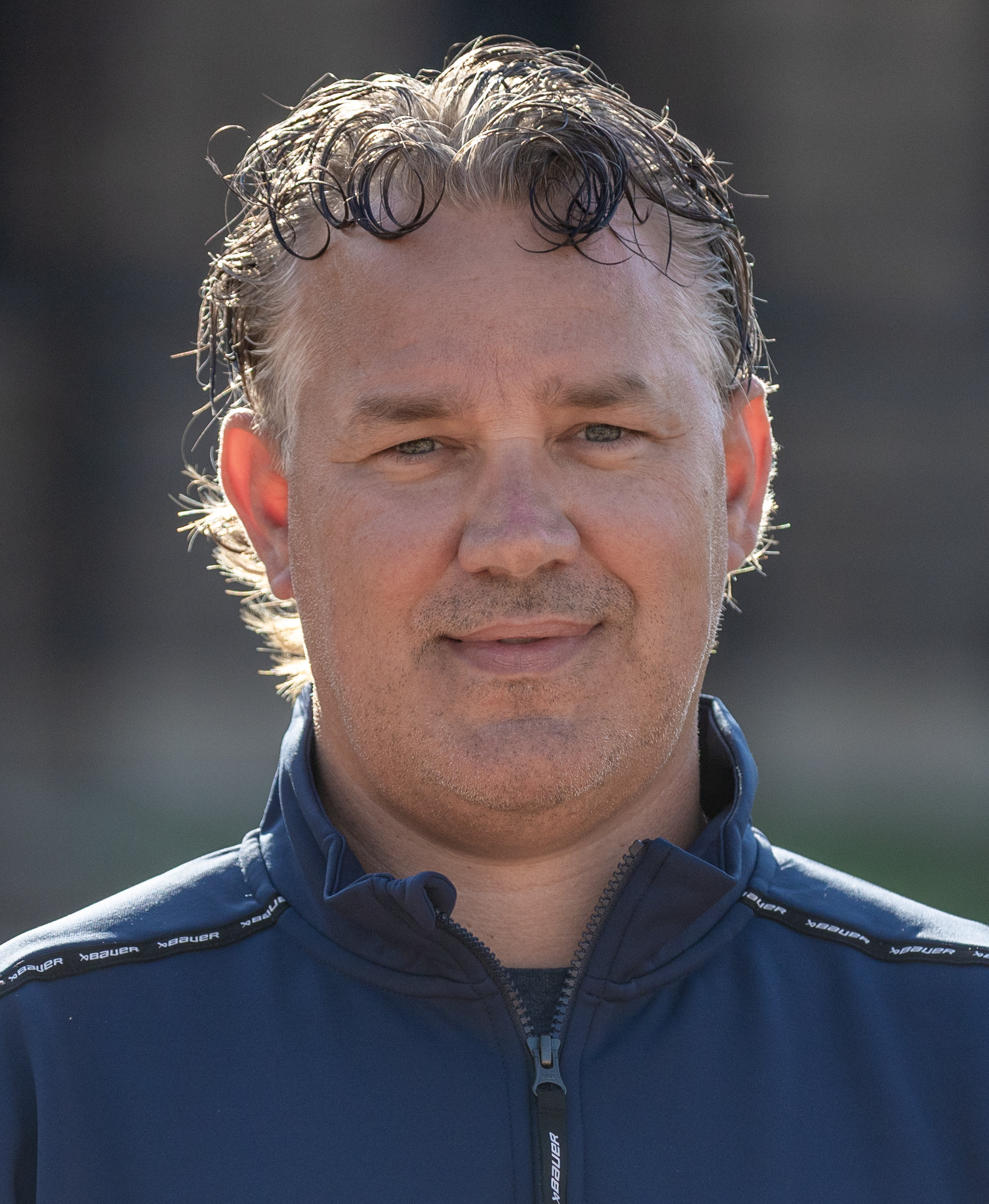
- Nason in 2026
- Playing career: 2005–present

Michael Nason is a professional ice hockey player.

== Playing career ==
Nason played at the AAA−, Metro Junior A− and OHL level in his native Canada and then started his college career at Manhattanville College in Purchase, New York. After one year with the "Valiants", he transferred to the University of Toronto, where he played until 2005. In 2004-05, his final year at "U of T", Nason made the OUA Second Team, garnered OUA East Most Sportsmanlike honors and was selected to play for Canada at the 2005 FISU World University Games in Austria.
