= Zoetermeer Panthers =

- City: Zoetermeer, Netherlands
- League: BeNe League
- Founded: 2010
- Home arena: Silverdome
- Colours: Black, yellow, white
- Head coach: Marc Visschers
- Website: zoetermeerpanters.nl

Zoetermeer Panthers are a professional ice hockey team, playing most seasons in the Eredivisie, the Dutch professional, top-level hockey league. They play in the Silverdome, an ice sports facility in Zoetermeer, Netherlands. They began play for the 2010–2011 season in the Dutch Bekercompetitie, the league leading up to the National Cup championship game. On November 26 the club announced that they would withdraw from the Eredivisie, effective immediately, due to lack of sponsors and poor attendance figures.

== Season results ==
Note: GP = Games played, W = Wins, OTW = Overtime Wins, OTL = Overtime Losses, L = Losses, GF = Goals for, GA = Goals against, Pts = Points

Season	GP	W	OTW	OTL	L	GF	GA	Pts	Finish	Playoffs
2010–11	12	4	1	3	4	44	51	17	--, Eredivisie	---

== Squad 2018-2019 ==
=== Goalies ===
- #1 Simon Schneider
- #35 Fabian Schotel
- #37 Casper Swart

=== Defence ===
- #41 Adam Blanchette
- #9 Johnny Ebregt
- #7 Adam Gebara
- #10 Wesley Hendriks
- #2 Travis Martell
- #26 Michael van Rijswijk
- #20 Dax van de Velden
- #24 Jeff Winchester
- #14 Nick van Zon

=== Forwards ===
- #23 Scott van den Elskamp
- #11 Terry Harrison
- #21 Marcel Kars
- #22 Marc LeFebvre
- #3 Joey Oosterveld
- #94 Andrew Schembri
- #71 Mike Smietana
- #61 Danny Stempher
- #19 Joy Turpijn
- #27 Pascal van de Velde

== PWA Silverdome ==
PWA Silverdome is an arena in Zoetermeer, Netherlands and is the home stadium of the Zoetermeer Panthers. It opened in 2002 and holds 3,500 people; it is primarily used for ice hockey.
