= Dutch Cup (ice hockey) =

The Dutch Cup, better known in Dutch as the "Beker" or "Bekercompetitie", is the national ice hockey cup in the Netherlands. It was held from 1938 to 1939, and 1971-present. The Dutch Cup is usually an autumn competition that precedes or runs simultaneously with the regular season of the BeNe League, the Dutch and Belgian semi-professional ice hockey league.

The format of the Dutch Cup competition is determined before each season and can vary depending on the number of teams competing. In 2011, the format consisted of:

- a 16-game preliminary round-robin, followed by
- a three-game playoff round-robin among the top four teams in the preliminary round
- a one-game final game among the top two teams from the playoff round.

In 2012-2013, the Cup competition was a knock-out competition of home-and-home series among the six Dutch teams of the Eredivisie and eight teams of the Eerste Divisie, the Netherlands' top amateur league. Since 2015, the Dutch Cup has been for the Dutch teams of the Beneliga, while the Belgian teams participate in their own Belgian Cup.

For most of its existence, the Dutch Cup has been a separate competition from the Dutch National Championship, which was determined in a playoff at the end of the season of the Eredivisie, the old Dutch hockey league. When the Eredivisie was merged with the Belgian hockey league to become the BeNe League in 2015-16, the Dutch Cup was retained as a separate tournament to decide the best Dutch team, while the BeNe League playoffs determine the BeNe League champions.

== Champions ==
- 1938 : HHIJC Den Haag
- 1939 : AIJHC Amsterdam
- 1970 : Tilburg Trappers 2nd division
- 1971 : Tilburg Trappers 2nd division
- 1972 : Tilburg Trappers
- 1973 : Tilburg Trappers
- 1974 : Tilburg Trappers
- 1975 : Tilburg Trappers
- 1976 : Tilburg Trappers
- 1977 : Feenstra Verwarming Heerenveen
- 1978 : Feenstra Verwarming Heerenveen
- 1979 : Feenstra Flyers Heerenveen
- 1980 : De Bisschop Amsterdam
- 1981 : Feenstra Flyers Heerenveen
- 1982 : Feenstra Flyers Heerenveen
- 1983 : Feenstra Flyers Heerenveen
- 1984 : Feenstra Flyers Heerenveen
- 1985 : Deko Builders Amsterdam
- 1986 : Eindhoven Kemphanen
- 1987 : IJHC Rotterdam Panda's
- 1988 : BP Flyers Heerenveen
- 1989 : Spitman Nijmegen
- 1990 : Gunco Panda's Rotterdam
- 1991 : Gunco Panda's Rotterdam
- 1992 : Agpo Trappers Tilburg
- 1993 : Meetpoint Eaters Geleen
- 1994 : Couwenberg Trappers Tilburg
- 1995 : Couwenberg Trappers Tilburg
- 1996 : Fulda Tigers Nijmegen
- 1997 : CVT Keukens Trappers Tilburg
- 1998 : Pelgrim Flyers Heerenveen
- 1999 : Agio Huys Tijgers Nijmegen
- 2000 : Boretti Tigers Amsterdam
- 2001 : Diamant Trappers Tilburg
- 2002 : Formido Heerenveen Flyers
- 2003 : Boretti Tigers Amsterdam
- 2004 : Amsterdam Bulldogs
- 2005 : Amsterdam Bulldogs
- 2006 : Destil Trappers Tilburg
- 2007 : Amstel Tijgers Amsterdam
- 2008 : Destil Trappers Tilburg
- 2009 : Romijnders DAR Devils Nijmegen
- 2010 : Ruijters Eaters Geleen
- 2011 : Destil Trappers Tilburg
- 2012 : HYS The Hague
- 2013 : Destil Trappers Tilburg
- 2014 : Destil Trappers Tilburg
- 2015 : Destil Trappers Tilburg
- 2016 : UNIS Flyers Heerenveen
- 2017 : UNIS Flyers Heerenveen
- 2018 : HIJS Hockij Den Haag
