= Dordrecht Lions =

- City: Dordrecht, Netherlands
- League: Eredivisie
- Conference: Eredivisie
- Division: Eredivisie
- Founded: 1977
- Home arena: Sportboulevard Dordrecht
- Colours: Blue, green, white
- Head coach: Alexander Jacobs

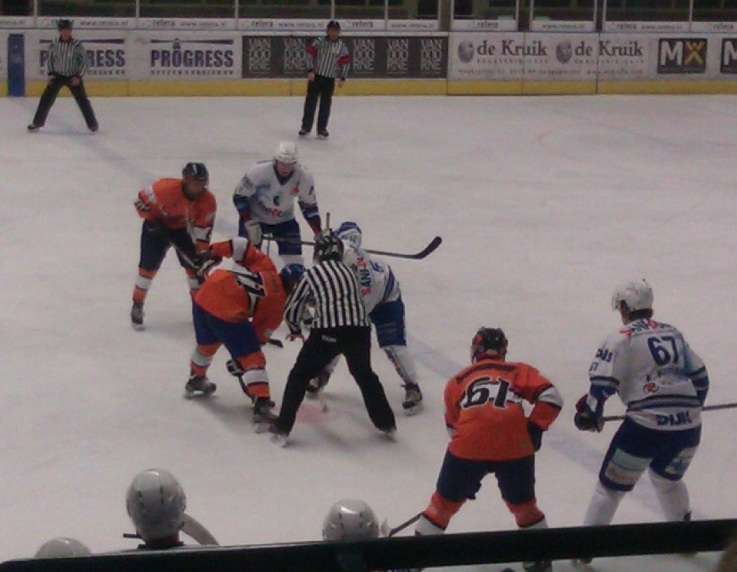

The Dordrecht Lions were an ice hockey team in Dordrecht, the Netherlands. They played in the Eredivisie, the top level of Dutch ice hockey.

== History ==
The club was founded in 1977. They played four seasons in the Eredivisie, the top-level Dutch league, from 1993 to 1997. Their best finish was sixth place in the regular season with a loss in the quarterfinals in the 1995-96 season. After winning the Dutch Eerste Divise (the second tier of hockey in The Netherlands) the Dordrecht Lions joined the Eredivisie for the 2013/14 season.

== Achievements ==
- Eerste Divisie champion (2): 2000, 2013
