= Red Eagles 's-Hertogenbosch =

Ice hockey team in 's-Hertogenbosch, the Netherlands

- City: 's-Hertogenbosch, Netherlands
- League: Eerste Divisie
- Founded: 1965
- Home arena: Sportiom 's-Hertogenbosch, 7,220 capacity
- Colours: Red, black, white
- Website: Red Eaglesn

Franchise history
- 1969–2007: S.IJ. Den Bosch
- 's-Hertogenbosch Red Eagles

The 's-Hertogenbosch Red Eagles were an ice hockey team in 's-Hertogenbosch, the Netherlands. Previously part of the BeNe League, they have played in the Eerste Divisie since the 2017–2018 season.

== History ==
The club was founded in 1965 and first participated in the Eredivisie during the 1966–1967 season. They won the league in the 1969–1970 season, finishing with an undefeated record.

== Achievements ==
- Eredivisie champion (1): 1970.
- Eerste Divisie champion (4): 1977, 1978, 1988, 2009.
- HTG-Bokaal champion (2): 1991, 2000.
- Coupe der Lage Landen champion (1): 1988.
