= Eindhoven Kemphanen =

- City: Eindhoven
- League: BeNe League
- Founded: 1970
- Home arena: Ijssportcentrum Eindhoven (capacity 1,700)
- Colours: Orange, blue
- Website: kemphanen.nl

Eindhoven Kemphanen is a professional ice hockey club in Eindhoven, The Netherlands. They played in the Dutch Cup and the Eredivisie) until season 2017-2018, the highest-level hockey division in the Netherlands. Home games are played at the IJssportcentrum Eindhoven.

== History ==
Eindhoven ice hockey began in the 1970s with the construction of a hockey arena. Eindhoven Kemphanen (Kemphanen, "fighting roosters" in English, is a play on words using the name of the "Kempen" region) first played in the Eredivisie in 1981-82 and played intermittently in the Eredivisie in the 1980s and 1990s. The highlight of this period was winning the Netherlands cup competition in 1986. The team returned to the Eredivisie in 2008-09 for the first time since 1996-97.

== Season results ==
Note: GP = Games played, W = Wins, OTW = Overtime Wins, OTL = Overtime Losses, L = Losses, GF = Goals for, GA = Goals against, Pts = Points

Season	GP	W	OTW	OTL	L	GF	GA	Pts	Finish	Playoffs
2012-13	36	10	1	3	22	122	161	35	6th, Eredivisie	Did not qualify
2011–12	14	5	1	1	7	66	47	18	5th, North Sea Cup	Lost semi-finals to The Hague (0-3)
2010–11	28	11	2	2	13	109	106	39	5th, North Sea Cup	Lost quarter-finals to Nijmegen (0-2)
2009–10	28	13	2	1	12	114	90	44	6th, Eredivisie	Lost quarter-finals to Tilburg (0-2)
2008–09	28	8	1	2	13	82	100	28	8th, Eredivisie	Lost quarter-finals to Tilburg (0-3)

== Championships ==
Eredivisie National Championships

None.

Netherlands Cup Winners

Once: 1986
