= GIJS Groningen =

Dutch ice hockey team

- City: Groningen, Netherlands
- League: Eredivisie
- Founded: 1969
- Home arena: Sportcentrum Kardinge
- Colours: Red, white, black
- Head coach: Pippo Limnell Finocchiaro
- Website: www.gijsgroningen.nl

GIJS Groningen (Groninger IJshockey Stichting), currently known as GIJS Marne Groningen for sponsorship reasons, are an ice hockey club in Groningen, Netherlands. They currently play in the second tier Eredivisie and play their home games at the Sportcentrum Kardinge. They won the Dutch championship in 1986, and played in the Eredivisie when it was the highest-level hockey division in the Netherlands until 2010, and spent one more season in the top flight when they played in the BeNe League in 2016/17.

== History ==
Founded on December 23, 1969, as Groninger IJshockey Stichting (GIJS), the team played in the lower divisions until 1976, when it began competing in the Eredivisie. It won its first and only Eredivisie championship in the 1985–86 season, with 7 wins and 1 loss in the playoffs.

Failure to attract a major sponsor forced the team out of the Eredivisie from 1988 until 2007. In 2007–2008, after winning two straight championships in the eerste divisie (the top amateur division), the team re-entered the Eredivisie for three seasons. However, after three losing seasons and weak ticket sales, the team dropped out of the Eredivisie in the summer of 2010.

=== Team names ===
- 1969–1993: Groninger IJshockey Stichting
- 1993–2004: GIJS Bears Groningen
- 2004–2007: Groningen Grizzlies
- 2007–2010: Pecoma Grizzlies Groningen
- 2010–2014: GIJS Bears Groningen
- 2014–2020: GIJS Groningen
- 2020–2024: HEPRO/GIJS Groningen
- since 2024: GIJS Marne Groningen

== Season results ==
Note: GP = Games played, W = Wins, OTW = Overtime Wins, OTL = Overtime Losses, L = Losses, Pts = Points, GF = Goals for, GA = Goals against

Season	GP	W	OTW	T	OTL	L	GF	GA	Pts	Finish	Playoffs
2009–10	28	1	0	–	1	26	87	223	4	8th, Eredivisie	Did not qualify
2008–09	24	10	2	–	0	12	77	90	34	6th, Eredivisie	Lost quarter-finals to Geleen
2007–08	24	1	1	–	1	21	61	207	6	7th, Eredivisie	Did not qualify
1988–2006	–	–	–	–	–	–	–	–	–	–	Did not compete in Eredivisie
1986–87	10	4	–	2	–	4	52	54	12	4th, Eredivisie	Did not qualify
1985–86	16	10	–	2	–	4	87	60	22	1st, Eredivisie	Won National Championship
1984–85	36	27	–	1	–	8	289	136	55	4th, Eredivisie	3rd in playoff round (3–0–3)
1983–84	10	3	–	0	–	7	39	65	6	5th, Eredivisie	Lost semi-final to Nijmegen (0–2)
1981–83	–	–	–	–	–	–	–	–	–	–	Did not compete in Eredivisie
1980–81	32	13	–	5	–	14	171	136	31	6th, Eredivisie	Did not qualify
1979–80	18	10	–	3	–	5	102	76	23	4th, Eredivisie	9rd in playoff round (1–2–3)
1978–79	18	11	–	1	–	6	91	76	23	4th, Eredivisie	2nd in playoff round (3–0–3)
1977–78	20	15	–	0	–	5	114	86	30	1st, Eredivisie	2nd in playoff round (4–0–2)
1976–77	24	9	–	1	–	14	127	154	30	6th, Eredivisie	None (regular season determined champion)
1975–76	14	9	–	2	–	7	62	77	12	5th, Eredivisie	None (regular season determined champion)

== Squad 2008–09 ==
=== Goalies ===
- 31 Mathieu Blanchard
- 35 Tom Korte

=== Defence ===
- 13 Jeroen Oosterwijk
- 14 Noel Coultice
- 19 Ronald Trip
- 4 Preston Cicchine
- 44 Blair Tassone
- 98 Ricardo Dijkema

=== Forwards ===
- 7 Lance Morrison
- 9 Derek Bachynski
- 11 Danny Kerstholt
- 14 Blair Lefebvre
- 15 Ram Sidhu
- 19 Jolke Balt
- 20 Zahir Hup
- 21 Alwin Assenberg
- 22 Reinier Holthof
- 24 Klaver Jan Middelweerd
- 29 Nick Pomponio
- 69 Arjan Peters

=== Coaches ===
- Coach: Sergey Yashin
- Team manager: Kees Lok

== Championships ==
Eredivisie National Championship

once: 1985–86

Eerste divisie championship

twice: 2005–06; 2006–07
