= Eaters Limburg =

Snackpoint Eaters Limburg
- City: Geleen, Netherlands
- League: CEHL; 2015-present Eredivisie; 1971-2015; Dutch Cup
- Founded: 1968
- Home arena: IJshal Glanerbrook (capacity: 1200)
- Colours: Red, blue, white
- Head coach: Andy Tenbult
- Asst. coaches: Alf Philippen; Erik Tummers
- Captain: Glenn Bakx
- Website: Microz Eaters Limburg

Franchise history
- 1968 - 1984: Smoke Eaters Geleen
- 1984 - 1985: Data Union
- 1985 - 1988: Smoke Eaters Geleen
- 1988 - 1991: Intercai Geleen
- 1991 - 1994: Meetpoint Eaters Geleen
- 1994- 1995: Hatulek Eaters Geleen
- 1995 - 1996: Smoke Eaters Geleen
- 1996 - 1997: Datak Eaters Geleen
- 1999 - 2013: Ruijters Eaters Geleen
- 2013 - 2014: Noptra Eaters Geleen
- 2014 - 2018: Laco Eaters Limburg
- 2018 - 2020: Microz Eaters Limburg
- 2020 - Present: Snackpoint Eaters Limburg

Eaters Limburg (originally known as the Smoke Eaters Geleen) are a professional ice hockey team based in Geleen, Netherlands. They play in the Central European Hockey League, the highest-level hockey league in the Netherlands and Belgium. Home games are played at the Glanerbrook.

== History ==
The Geleen Smoke Eaters, named after the Trail Smoke Eaters, played their first game against Amsterdam on November 2, 1968. They first competed in the Eredivisie in 1971 and have participated in most of its seasons. Since 2015 the team have played in the CEHL, known as BeNe League until 2024.

== Season results ==
Note: GP = Games played, W = Wins, OTW = Overtime Wins, OTL = Overtime Losses, L = Losses, GF = Goals for, GA = Goals against, Pts = Points

Season	GP	W	OTW	OTL	L	GF	GA	Pts	Finish	Playoffs
2012-13	36	16	5	0	15	136	126	58	4th, Eredivisie	Lost semi-finals to The Hague (0W-3L)
2011–12	14	12	0	0	2	72	36	36	2nd, North Sea Cup	Won National Championship (3W-2L)
2010–11	28	10	2	2	14	105	127	36	6th, North Sea Cup	Lost semi-finals to The Hague (0-3)
2009–10	28	13	6	1	8	100	77	52	4th, Eredivisie	Lost semi-finals to Nijmegen (1-3)
2008–09	24	11	3	2	8	96	89	41	3rd, Eredivisie	Lost semi-finals to The Hague (0-3)
2007-08	24	11	1	1	11	102	69	36	4th, Eredivisie	Lost semi-finals to Tilburg (2-4)
2006-07	20	14	0	1	5	101	60	43	1st, Eredivisie	Lost semi-finals to Heerenveen (0-3)
2005-06	20	8	5	2	5	84	71	36	3rd, Eredivisie	Lost semi-finals to Heerenveen (1-2)

== Roster ==
Updated February 28, 2019.

Goaltenders
Number		Player	Catches	Acquired	Place of Birth
34	(Netherlands)	Rowan Delil	L	2007	Spaubeek, Netherlands
31	(Netherlands)	Michael Sterkens	L	2017	Tilburg, Netherlands
30	(Netherlands)	Sander Kösters	L	2013	Beek, Netherlands

Defencemen
Number		Player	Shoots	Acquired	Place of Birth
3	(Netherlands)	Remco Knoren	R	2017	Wijlre, Netherlands
6	(Belgium)	Vadim Gyesbreghs (A)	L	2017	Wilrijk, Belgium
14	(Netherlands)	Sebastian Kragt	R	2018	Amsterdam, Netherlands
24	(Netherlands)	Mordy Munichman	L	2017	Sittard, Netherlands
27	(Netherlands)	Levi Smeets	L	2015	Heerlen, Netherlands
49	(Netherlands)	Glenn Bakx (C)	L	2006	Geleen, Netherlands
55	(Canada)	Yan Turcotte	L	2018	Montreal, Canada

Forwards
Number		Player	Shoots	Position	Acquired	Place of Birth
7	(Netherlands)	Mitch Koumans	L	F	2014	Heerlen, Netherlands
8	(Netherlands)	Nick Verschuren	R	F	2018	Eindhoven, Netherlands
9	(Netherlands)	Lars van Sloun (A)	L	F	2006	Brunssum, Netherlands
11	(Netherlands)	Tom Marx	L	F	2014	Sittard, Netherlands
17	(Netherlands)	Thom Smits	L	F	2017	Roermond, Netherlands
20	(Netherlands)	Luca Heutmekers	R	F	2012	Geleen, Netherlands
22	(Netherlands)	Renzo Meulenbeek	L	F	2014	Geleen, Netherlands
22	(Netherlands)	Jord Smit	R	RW	2014	Grouw, Netherlands
67	(Netherlands)	Joey Geurts	R	F	2013	Geleen, Netherlands
81	(Poland)	Lukasz Bartak	L	LW	2018	Poland
90	(Canada)	Matt Beer	L	C/RW	2018	St. Clair, Canada
93	(Netherlands)	Dean Moors	L	F	2009	Geleen, Netherlands

== Championships ==
Eredivisie National Championship

One (2011–2012)

Netherlands Cup Winners

Twice. (1992–1993);(2009–2010)

== Former players ==
- Nathan Daly
- Benjamin Finkenrath
- David Coderre
