= UNIS Flyers =

UNIS Flyers Heerenveen
- City: Heerenveen, Netherlands
- League: BeNe League; 2015-present Eredivisie; 1971-2015; Dutch Cup
- Founded: 1967
- Home arena: Thialf (capacity: 2,500)
- Colours: Blue, white, red
- General manager: Rob van Aalderen
- Head coach: Mike Nason
- Asst. coach: Pippo Limnell Finocchiaro
- Website: UNIS Flyers

The UNIS Flyers are a professional ice hockey club located in Heerenveen, Netherlands. The team competes in the BeNe League and also takes part in the Dutch Cup. Home games are played in the ice hockey arena which forms part of the Thialf complex.

== History ==
The UNIS Flyers were founded in 1967 and played their first season in the Eredivisie in 1971-72. The Flyers set the Eredivisie record for the most consecutive championships with 7 between 1976 and 1983.

Heerenveen is the smallest Dutch city currently represented in the BeNe League (although the Belgian city of Herentals is smaller).

Over the years, the Flyers have competed under a variety of different names, since 2013 they have been known as the UNIS Flyers, due to a sponsorship deal with industrial electronics company UNIS Group.

Names marked with * are sponsorship names.

Competed name	Seasons	Notes
Thialf Heerenveen	1971/72 - 1973/74	
Peters & Jagers Heerenveen*	1974/75	
Feenstra Verwarming Heerenveen*	1975/76 - 1977/78	
Feenstra Flyers*	1978/79 - 1983/84	
Freriks Flyers*	1984/85	
BP Flyers*	1985/86 - 1989/90	
Forbo Flyers*	1990/91 - 1991/92	
Flyers	1992/93 - 1994/95	(until January 1995)
Pelgrim Flyers*	1994/95 - 1999/00	(from January 1995)
Formido Flyers*	2000/01 - 2003/04	
Vadeko Flyers*	2004/05 - 2007/08	
Hajé Flyers*	2008/09 - 2009/10	
A6.nl Flyers*	2010/11	
Friesland Flyers	2011/12 - 2012/13	(until January 2013 still sponsored by A6.nl)
UNIS Flyers*	2013–present	

== Championships ==
National Championship
9 times Champion: 1976-77, 1977–78, 1978–79, 1979–80, 1980–81, 1981–82, 1982–83, 2015-16, 2016-17
Dutch Cup
12 times winner: 1976-77, 1977–78, 1978–79, 1980–81, 1981–82, 1982–83, 1983–84, 1987–88, 1997–98, 2001-02, 2015-16, 2016-2017

== Season results ==
Recent seasons from 2005-06 to 2012-13.

Note: GP = Games played, W = Wins, OTW = Overtime Wins, OTL = Overtime Losses, L = Losses, GF = Goals for, GA = Goals against, Pts = Points

Season	GP	W	OTW	OTL	L	GF	GA	Pts	Finish	Playoffs
2012–13	36	21	2	3	10	138	97	70	3rd, Eredivisie	Lost semi-finals to Tilburg (0W-3L)
2011–12	14	5	0	1	8	52	63	16	6th, North Sea Cup	Lost qtr.final round-robin to The Hague and Tilburg(0W-1OTL-7L)
2010–11	28	15	4	0	9	118	105	53	3rd, North Sea Cup	Lost quarter-finals to Geleen (0-2)
2009–10	28	15	2	2	9	125	88	51	5th, Eredivisie	Lost quarter-finals to Geleen (0-2)
2008–09	24	11	1	2	10	87	79	37	5th, Eredivisie	Lost quarter-finals to Nijmegen (0-3)
2007-08	24	18	1	1	4	119	53	57	2nd, Eredivisie	Lost finals to Tilburg (1-4)
2006-07	20	8	3	0	9	80	78	30	4th, Eredivisie	Lost semi-finals to Geleen (0-3)
2005-06	20	12	1	3	4	92	56	41	2nd, Eredivisie	Lost finals to Nijmegen (2-3)

== Roster ==
Updated February 25, 2024

Goaltenders
Number		Player	Catches	Acquired	Place of Birth
41	(Netherlands)	Martijn Oosterwijk	L	2019	Groningen, Netherlands
43	(Netherlands)	Almer de Boer	L	2022	Heerenveen, Netherlands

Defencemen
Number		Player	Shoots	Acquired	Place of Birth
3	(Finland)	Pippo Limnell Finocchiaro	R	2015	Catania, Italy
14	(Netherlands)	Niels van der Vossen	L	2011	Netherlands
18	(Netherlands)	Kenny Welles	L	2010	Oudeschoot, Netherlands
24	(Canada)	Trevor Hunt	L	2018	Maple Ridge, British Columbia, Canada
52	(Netherlands)	Mark Hoekstra	R	2010	Heerenveen, Netherlands
76	(Netherlands)	Viktor Nordemann	L	2018	Amsterdam, Netherlands
91	(Netherlands)	Ernesto Klem	R	2016	The Hague, Netherlands
91	(United States)	Todd Ratchford	R	2018	Howell, Michigan, United States

Forwards
Number		Player	Shoots	Position	Acquired	Place of Birth
7	(Netherlands)	Jasper Nordemann	R	F	2018	Amsterdam, Netherlands
10	(Netherlands)	Brent Janssen	R	F	2013	Heerenveen, Netherlands
15	(Netherlands)	Wessel Copier	R	F	2021	De Meern, Netherlands
19	(Netherlands)	Tom Speel	R	F	2021	Netherlands
21	(Netherlands)	Tony Demelinne	L	LW	2012	The Hague, Netherlands
22	(Netherlands)	Dave van den Bos	L	F	2019	Netherlands
27	(Canada)	Jesse Barwell	L	C	2023	Oakville, Canada
28	(Netherlands)	Lars den Edel	R	F	2016	Leeuwarden, Netherlands
84	(Netherlands)	Kevin Nijland	L	F	2008	Heerenveen, Netherlands
92	(Netherlands)	Dennis Sikma	L	F	2014	Heerenveen, Netherlands
97	(Netherlands)	Marc Nijland	L	F	2015	Netherlands

=== Staff ===
- Mike Nason – Head Coach
- Pippo Limnell Finocchiaro – Assistant Coach
- Rob van Aalderen – Team manager
- Jan Berkenpas - Equipment manager
- Sean Berkenpas - Assistant to the Equipment manager
- Erik Veen – Physiotherapist
- Piety Elsinga - Physiotherapist

== Former coaches ==
- (Socialist Federal Republic of Yugoslavia) Alex Andjelic
- (Canada) Dave Hyrsky

== Notable players ==
- (Netherlands) Alwin Assenberg
- (Netherlands) Jolke Balt
- (Netherlands) Jeroen Beeksma
- (Netherlands) Pim van de Strijkerburg
- (Canada) Cole Byers
