= HYS The Hague =

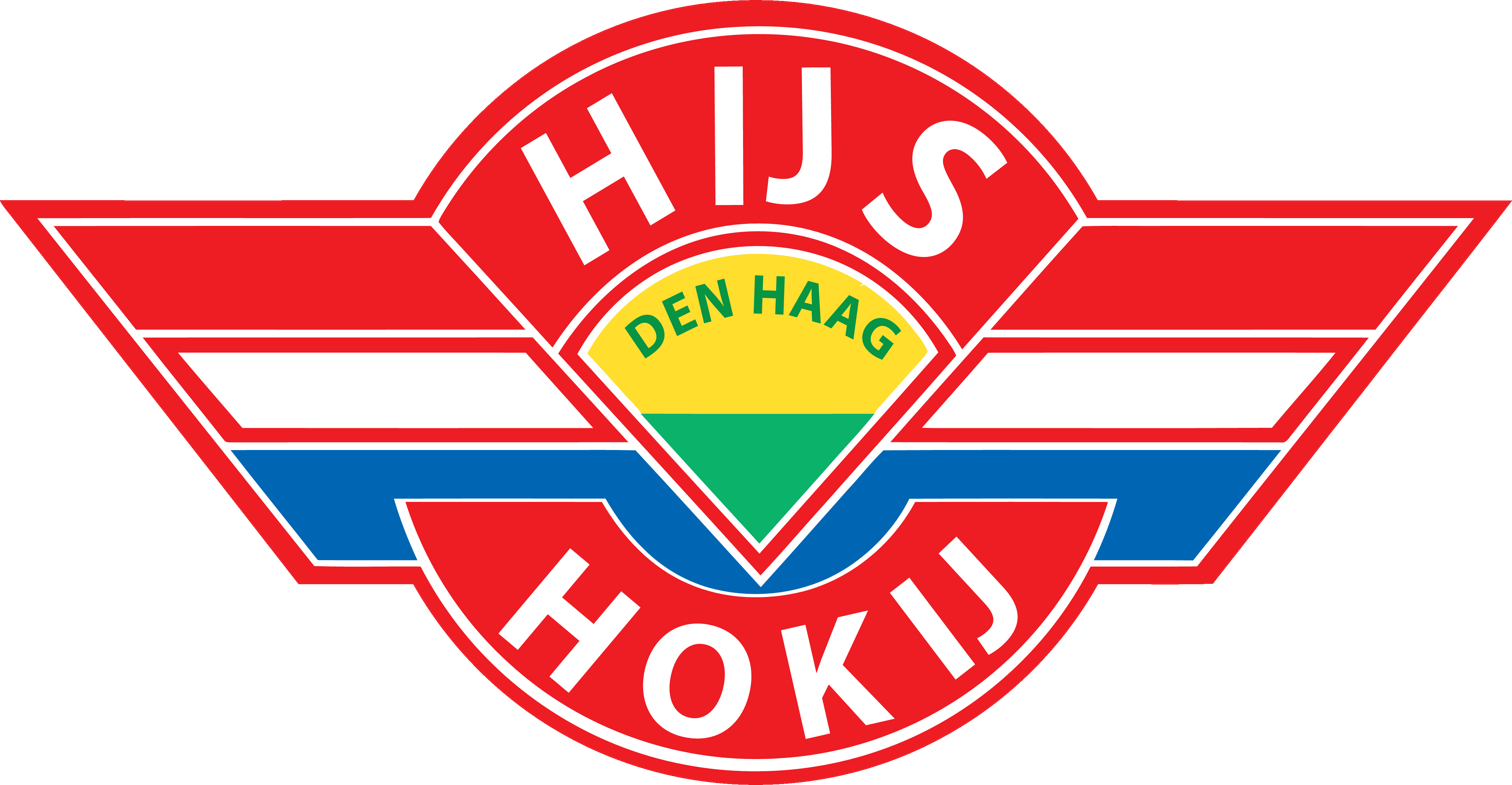
- City: The Hague
- League: BeNe League
- Founded: 1933
- Home arena: De Uithof (capacity: 2,610)
- Colours: Blue, red, white
- Head coach: Chris Eimers
- Website: Hijs Hokij

HYS The Hague (Dutch: "Hijs Hokij Den Haag") is a professional ice hockey club in The Hague, Netherlands. Founded in 1933, the club's top team plays in the Dutch/Belgian BeNe League and competes annually in the Dutch National Championships and the Dutch Cup tournament.

The most successful hockey team in the Netherlands during the 1960s, it broke a 40-year national championship drought by winning the National championship in 2009. It has since repeated as champion in 2011, 2013, 2018, 2022 and 2023.

Home games are held at de Uithof, a winter sports recreational facility in the west of the city. It has 2,050 regular seats, 160 VIP-box seats and 400 standing room spaces.

== Name ==
"HYS" is pronounced "hice" and stands for "Haagsche IJshockey Stichting" ("Ice Hockey Club of the Hague"; when using capital letters, "Y" sometimes replaces the Dutch letter "ij").

Variations of the name have included "H.H.IJ.C. Den Haag" (Hague Hockey and Ice hockey Club) and "H.IJ.S. Hoky Den Haag". When competing from 2007-2015, its name was anglicized as "HYS The Hague". For the 2006-2007 season, the team was known as the "Calco Wolves".

== History ==
The team was founded on April 16, 1933 as part of a three-team league (together with Tilburg and Amsterdam) called the Nederlandse IJshockey Bond. This league began play in 1934. In 1937-38 The Hague won the championship for the first time, repeating in 1938-39 and winning the Western Europe Cup. The team played all of its 1940 season in Tilburg and Amsterdam because of a lack of home arena.

Dutch hockey was interrupted during the German occupation from 1941–1944, but resumed in 1945 when an arena was rebuilt in The Hague. Nederlandse IJshockey Bond set up the Eeredivisie, the top Dutch ice hockey division, in 1946. HHIJC was once again competitive, winning the Eredivise championship in 1946 and 1948. In 1947, HHIJC merged with the Penguins, another Hague team.

The team was most dominant during the relaunch of the Eeredivie in the 1960s, repeating five times as champions from 1964 to 1969. The team then entered into a period of almost 40 years of decline, winning no championships and only intermittently playing in the Eredivisie from the 1980s to the early 2000s. In 1996, HHIJS merged with another Hague team, HOKY, to become the HHIJS HOKY Wolves.

In 2004, the team permanently re-entered the Eredivisie, finishing in last place (1-0-3-16 in 2005-06; 3-1-0-16 in 2006-2007). In 2007-08, it dropped the "Wolves" nickname and played as "HYS The Hague", a name reminiscent of successful teams of the past. That year, it had its first winning season in the Eredivisie since 1979, with a record of 14 wins, 2 overtime wins, 2 overtime losses and 6 regular season losses, good enough for third place.

In 2008-09, the team improved to second place overall with a record of 14-3-2-5, and won its first national championship in 40 years by defeating Tilburg in the playoff finals. This would have qualified the team to participate in the 2009-2010 Champions Hockey League, but the tournament was cancelled for financial reasons. Instead, the team participated in the 2009–10 IIHF Continental Cup, making it to the third stage.

Since then, it has remained one of the top teams in the Netherlands, winning additional national championships in 2011, 2013, 2018, 2022, and 2023. It won its first Dutch Cup in the post-war era in 2011 and has since followed up with Dutch Cupt victories in 18, 2022, 2023 and 2024. It also won both North Sea Cup tournaments that were played, in 2011 and 2012.

== Season results ==
Note: GP = Games played, W = Wins, OTW = Overtime Wins, OTL = Overtime Losses, L = Losses, GF = Goals for, GA = Goals against, Pts = Points

Season	GP	W	OTW	OTL	L	GF	GA	Pts	Finish	Dutch Championship Playoffs
2012-13	36	26	4	1	5	207	91	87	1st, Eredivisie	Won National Championship (3W-0L vs Tillburg)
2011-12	14	12	0	0	2	97	41	36	1st, North Sea Cup	Lost finals to Geleen (2W-3L)
2010-11	28	23	0	0	5	194	79	69	1st, North Sea Cup	Won National Championship (4-1)
2009–10	28	18	0	2	8	134	72	56	2nd, Eredivisie	Lost semi-finals to Tilburg (2-3)
2008-09	24	14	3	2	5	107	72	50	2nd, Eredivisie	Won National Championship (3-2)
2007-08	24	14	2	2	6	122	76	48	3rd, Eredivisie	Lost semi-finals to Heerenveen (1-4)
2006-07	20	3	1	0	16	54	113	11	6th, Eredivisie	Did not qualify
2005-06	20	1	0	3	16	54	130	6	6th, Eredivisie	Did not qualify

== Roster ==
Updated February 14, 2019.

Goaltenders
Number		Player	Catches	Acquired	Place of Birth
38	(Netherlands)	Jan Willem Groenheijde	L	2018	Voorburg, Netherlands
29	(Netherlands)	Tomislav Hrelja	L	2018	Geleen, Netherlands
24	(Netherlands)	Cas Neuman	L	2016	Leidschendam, Netherlands

Defencemen
Number		Player	Shoots	Acquired	Place of Birth
4	(Netherlands)	Reinier Staats	R	2018	Tilburg, Netherlands
6	(Netherlands)	Ceaney van Uijtrecht	L	2018	's-Hertogenbosch, Netherlands
10	(Netherlands)	Mike van Oeveren	L	2013	The Hague, Netherlands
15	(Netherlands)	Stijn Knoop	L	2012	Zoetermeer, Netherlands
18	(Sweden)	Viktor Gibbs Sjödin	R	2017	Uppsala, Sweden
60	(Netherlands)	Jurryt Smid (A)	L	2017	The Hague, netherlands
65	(Netherlands)	Maurice van der Schuit	L	2014	Rotterdam, Netherlands

Forwards
Number		Player	Shoots	Position	Acquired	Place of Birth
3	(Netherlands)	Joey Oosterveld (A)	L	C	2016	Amsterdam, Netherlands
7	(Netherlands)	Alan van Bentem (C)	L	F	2017	The Hague, Netherlands
8	(Netherlands)	Levi Boer	R	F	2017	Dordrecht, Netherlands
9	(Netherlands)	Stace van Bentem	R	F	2009	The Hague, Netherlands
11	(Netherlands)	Jelle Kronenburg	L	F	2018	The Hague, Netherlands
12	(Netherlands)	Marco Bommezijn	L	F	2008	The Hague, Netherlands
13	(Netherlands)	Raymond van der Schuit	L	LW/RW	2016	Rotterdam, Netherlands
17	(Netherlands)	Jasper Kick	R	RW	2008	Delft, Netherlands
20	(Netherlands)	Dani van Schilt	L	F	2015	The Hague, Netherlands
22	(Slovakia)	Oliver Pataky	L	RW	2017	Trenčín, Slovakia
66	(Netherlands)	Mike Verschuren	R	F	2018	Eindhoven, Netherlands
77	(Netherlands)	Donny van Musscher	L	LW	2017	Amsterdam, Netherlands

== Rivals ==
The Eredivise currently has seven teams. Apart from HYS, there are the Tilburg Trappers, Friesland Flyers, Eindhoven Kemphanen, Herentals HYC and Geleen Eaters and Dordrecht Lions.

Although HYS struggled throughout the early 1970s to the early 2000s, the team has consistently been a league contender since 2008, along with Tilburg Trappers and Geleen Eaters. In the 2009-2010 season, HYS came in second place in the regular season; Nijmegen was first. HYS was released into the quarter-finals, but lost in the semi-finals of Tilburg in 5 games (2-3). In the finals, Tilburg lost in 3 games of Nijmegen (3-0 to Nijmegen).

In the 2009-2010 season, HYS lost the national Cup (an annual pre-season tournament) to Nijmegen. During

== Championships ==
- National Championships

10 times: 1945-46; 1947–48; 1964–65; 1965–66; 1966–67; 1967–68; 1968–69; 2008–09, 2010-2011, 2012-2013, 2017-2018.

- Dutch National Champions (during years that a top league did not operate)

5 times: 1937-38; 1938–39; 1952–53; 1953–54; 1954–55

- Dutch Cups

Twice: 1938; 2011; 2018

- North Sea Cups

Twice: 2011; 2012

- Western Europe Cup/International Cup

5 times: 1938; 1949; 1950; 1951; 1952; 1963

- Barbanson Cup

once: 1949

- BeNeLeague Championship

once: 2018
