= Eredivisie (ice hockey) =

Ice hockey league in the Netherlands, 1945–2015

- Sport: Ice hockey
- Founded: 1945; 81 years ago
- Folded: 2015; 11 years ago
- Continent: Netherlands

The Eredivisie ("Honour Division") was, during its existence, the only professional ice hockey league in the Netherlands and the highest level of competition organized by the Nederlandse IJshockey Bond (NIJB; English: "Dutch Ice Hockey Federation"). Formed in 1945 and playing continuously since 1964, the league mainly featured Dutch teams, although in some seasons certain Belgian teams competed. The league featured a mix of Dutch, European and overseas players. The winner of the Eredivisie was crowned the Dutch National Champion and represented the Netherlands in the IIHF Continental Cup. In 2015, with most of its teams facing financial problems and its top team, Tilburg Trappers, joining the German Oberliga, the Eredivise was suspended with the remaining teams joining the BeNe League.

From 2015, the Eerste Divisie became the highest league organised by the NIJB, as a second tier below the BeNe League (now CEHL). Since 2020 this second tier league is called Eredivisie.

Eredivisie Teams for 2013-2014

== Teams ==
The league had many different teams during its existence. The financial viability of teams and availability of an arena often determined which cities participated in any given year. The teams in its final year of competition were:

Team	City	Arena
Eindhoven Kemphanen	Eindhoven	IJssportcentrum Eindhoven (cap. 1,700)
HYS The Hague	The Hague	de Uithof (cap. 2,610)
Geleen Eaters	Sittard-Geleen	Glanerbrook (cap. 1,200)
Friesland Flyers	Heerenveen	Thialf (cap. 3,500)
Destil Trappers	Tilburg	IJssportcentrum Tilburg (cap. 2,500)
HYC Herentals	Herentals	Bloso IJsbaan (cap. 1,200)
Dordrecht Lions	Dordrecht	Sportboulevard Dordrecht (cap. 700)

== Format ==
The league's format changed from year to year depending on the number of teams and the format of the Dutch Cup Tournament. As an example, in the 2013-14 year, the league had a 36-game regular season, followed by a best-of five semi-finals amongst the top five qualifiers and a best-of-five final for the Dutch championship.

== History ==
=== Formation ===
The Dutch ice hockey Eredivisie was formed after World War II, with teams in Amsterdam, The Hague and Tilburg. It suspended operations from 1950 to 1964, but has organized a season of competition annually ever since. Over the years the number of teams competing fluctuated between 3 and 10 (currently 7), and the number of games played in the regular season between 4 and 36.

=== Recent History ===
For the 2008-2009 Eredivisie season, the Utrecht Dragons and Eindhoven Kemphanen joined the league. In 2009-2010, Utrecht returned to the Eerste Divisie. Prior to the 2010-2011 season, Amstel Tijgers, one of the oldest teams in the league, dropped out, as did Groningen Grizzlies after three seasons, due to poor results on the ice and low revenues. In 2010, a new team, the Zoetermeer Panthers, won the Dutch Cup but dropped out of the first North Sea Cup tournament due to financial problems.

For two seasons, 2010–11 and 2011–12, the league's regular season consisted of a tournament with several Belgian teams called the North Sea Cup. The two countries maintained distinct national cups and national championship playoffs during these years. The Belgian teams, namely HYC Herentals, Turnhout White Caps, and Leuven Chiefs, struggled on and off the ice in the new league, with smaller budgets and fewer imported players than their Dutch counterparts. By the end of the second North Sea Cup season, Leuven and Turnhout had dropped out of the league. The North Sea Cup was disbanded in the summer of 2012 when the lone remaining Belgian team, HYC Herentals, was admitted as a full member of the Dutch Eredivisie.

For 2013-14, the Amsterdam G's, which replaced the Amstel Tijgers for 2011-2012 and 2013-2013, ceased operations after financial problems and back-to-back last place finishes, while the Dordrecht Lions began play in the Eredivisie. However, financial strains on several clubs and a wide disparity between the quality of the teams took a toll on competition and attendance. In 2015, the consistently strongest team of the league, Tilburg Trappers, joined the German Oberliga. This prompted the remaining teams of the Eredivisie to join with the top amateur teams in the Netherlands and Belgium to form the BeNe League, to provide greater financial stability and more balanced competition.

== Other Leagues ==
In the Netherlands, below the Eredivisie was the Eerste Divisie (First Division), the country's top amateur ice hockey league. There was no relegation or promotion between the Eredivisie and the Eerste Divisie. Some cities (such as Tilburg and The Hague) had hockey clubs operating a professional team in the Eredivisie and a separate amateur team in the Eerste Divisie. All other Dutch hockey leagues are recreational leagues. Dutch Eredivisie and Eerste Divisie teams competed against each other for the Dutch Cup, a tournament that was played before and during the Eredivisie regular season.

In Belgium, the Belgian National League operated as the league with the top Belgian teams, apart from HYC Herentals which played in the Eredivisie. Herentals competed in the Belgian Cup tournament but in the Dutch national championship tournament.

Upon the demise of the Eredivisie, the remaining Eredivisie teams merged with the Eerste Divisie and Belgian National League teams to form the BeNe League.

== Champions ==
Dutch Eredivisie national champions since 1946:

Season	Winner
1945–46	H.H.IJ.C. Den Haag
1946–47	T.IJ.S.C. Tilburg
1947–48	H.H.IJ.C. Den Haag
1948–49	Not Played
1949–50	IJsvogels Amsterdam
1950–64	Not Played
1964–65	H.IJ.S. Hoky Den Haag
1965–66	H.IJ.S. Hoky Den Haag
1966–67	H.IJ.S. Hoky Den Haag
1967–68	H.IJ.S. Hoky Den Haag
1968–69	H.IJ.S. Hoky Den Haag
1969–70	S.IJ. Den Bosch
1970–71	Tilburg Trappers
1971–72	Tilburg Trappers
1972–73	Tilburg Trappers
1973–74	Tilburg Trappers
1974–75	Tilburg Trappers
1975–76	Tilburg Trappers
1976–77	Feenstra Verwarming Heerenveen
1977–78	Feenstra Verwarming Heerenveen
1978–79	Feenstra Flyers Heerenveen
1979–80	Feenstra Flyers Heerenveen
1980–81	Feenstra Flyers Heerenveen
1981–82	Feenstra Flyers Heerenveen
1982–83	Feenstra Flyers Heerenveen
1983–84	Vissers Nijmegen
1984–85	Deko Builders Amsterdam
1985–86	Lada GIJS Groningen
1986–87	IJ.H.C. Rotterdam Panda's
1987–88	Spitman Nijmegen
1988–89	Gunco Panda's Rotterdam
1989–90	Gunco Panda's Rotterdam
1990–91	Peter Langhout Reizen Utrecht
1991–92	Pro Badge Utrecht
1992–93	Flame Guards Nijmegen
1993–94	Couwenberg Trappers Tilburg
1994–95	Couwenberg Trappers Tilburg
1995–96	CVT Keuken Trappers Tilburg
1996–97	Fulda Tigers Nijmegen
1997–98	Van Heumen Tigers Nijmegen
1998–99	Agio Huys Tigers Nijmegen
1999–2000	Agio Huys Tigers Nijmegen
2000–01	Diamant Trappers Tilburg
2001–02	Boretti Tigers Amsterdam
2002–03	Boretti Tigers Amsterdam
2003–04	Amsterdam Bulldogs
2004–05	Amsterdam Bulldogs
2005–06	Hatulek Emperors Nijmegen
2006–07	Destil Trappers Tilburg
2007–08	Destil Trappers Tilburg
2008–09	HYS The Hague
2009–10	Romijnders Devils Nijmegen
2010–11	HYS The Hague
2011–12	Ruijters Eaters Geleen
2012–13	HYS The Hague
2013–14	Destil Trappers
2014–15	Destil Trappers
2015–16	Friesland Flyers
2016–17	Friesland Flyers
2017–18	HYS The Hague

== Notable ex NHL players ==
- Karl Dykhuis
- Yutaka Fukufuji
- Alexander Selivanov
- Zarley Zalapski
- Jason Lafreniere
- Roger Kortko
- Jeff Paul
- Rick Boh
- John Wensink
- Jaroslav Sevcik
- Dale Henry
- Paul Houck
- Dan Bourbonnais
- Jozef Cierny
- Michel Galarneau
- Mark Pederson
- Dale Weise
- Mark Botell

== Notable ex NHL coaches ==
- Fred Shero
- Lou Vairo
