= List of Ukrainian Canadians =

This is a list of notable Ukrainian Canadians, including both original immigrants who obtained Canadian citizenship and their Canadian descendants. To be included in this list, the person must have a Wikipedia article showing they are Ukrainian Canadian or must have references showing they are Ukrainian Canadian and are notable.

== Arts and entertainment ==
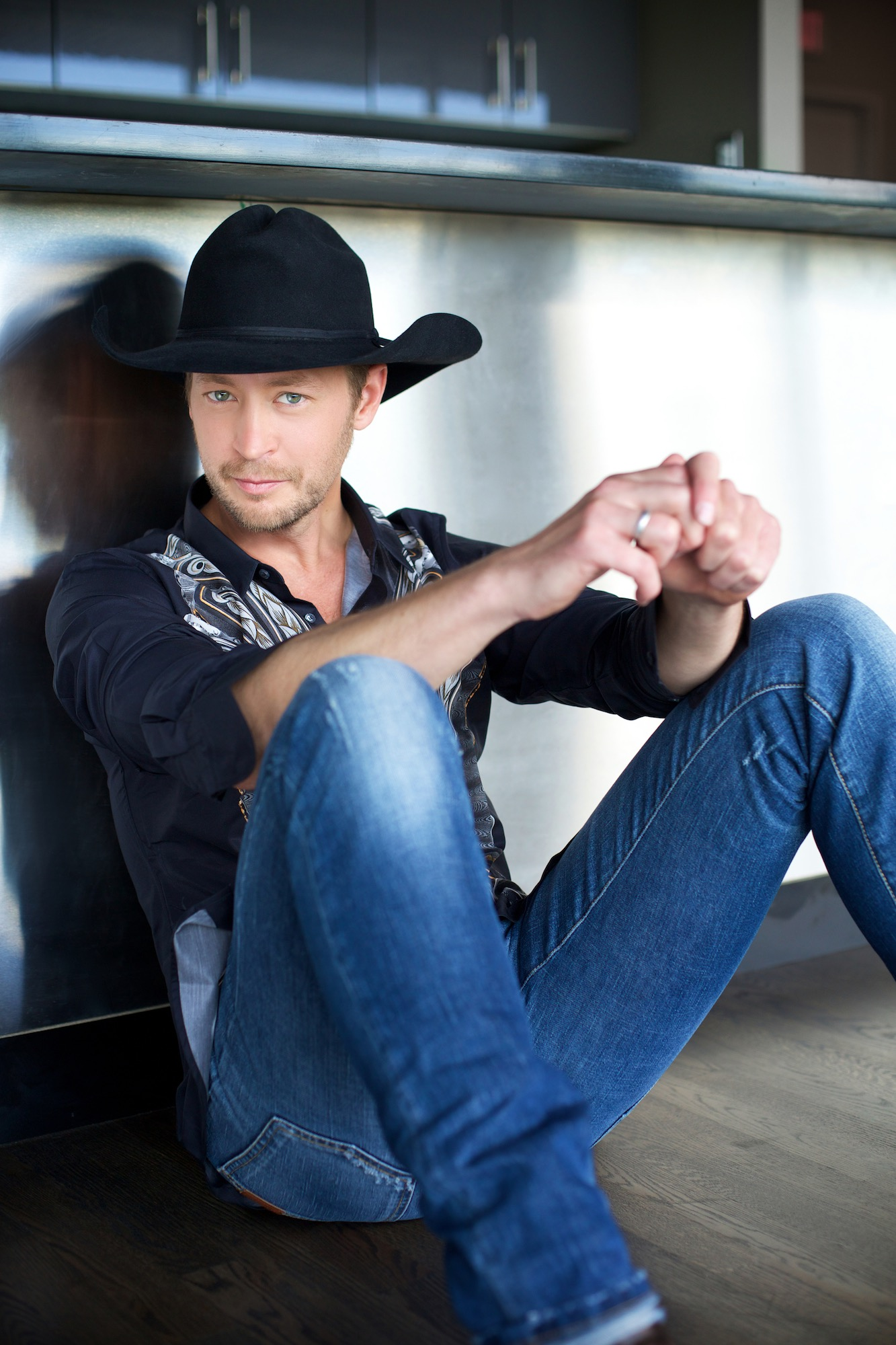
Paul Brandt

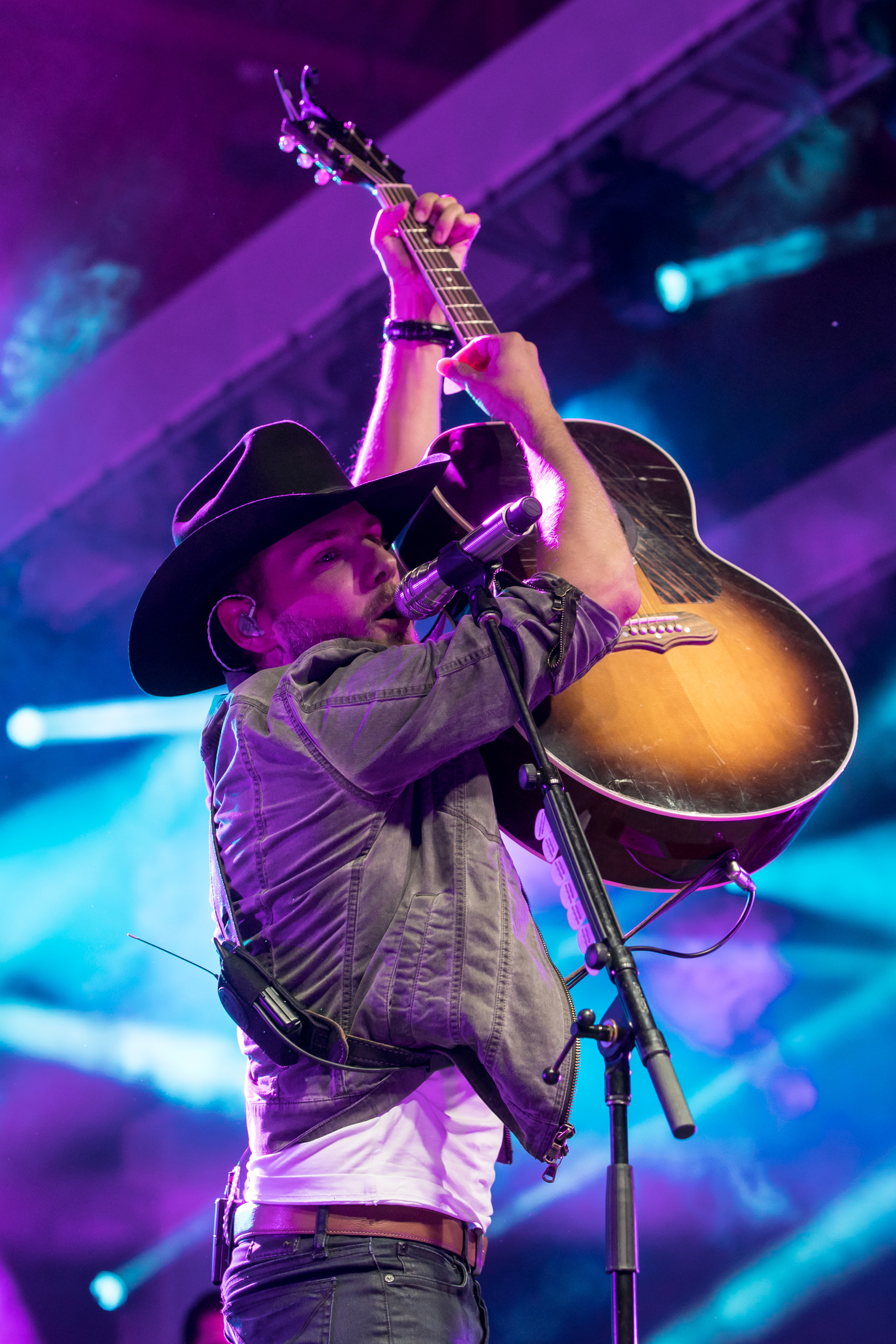
Brett Kissel

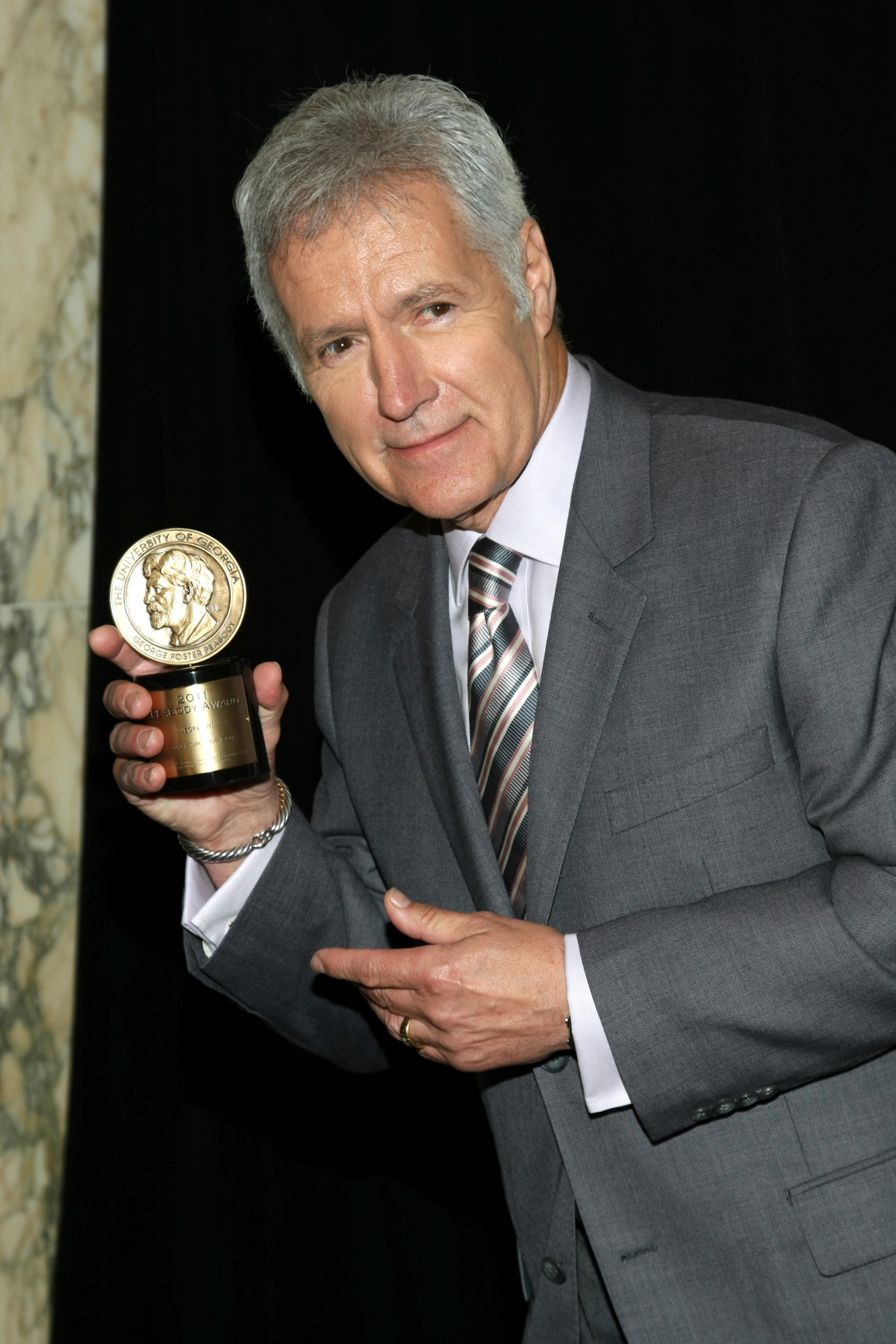
Alex Trebek

=== Actors ===
- Peter Boretski, actor
- Erik Everhard, actor and director
- Jacob Ewaniuk, actor
- Sophia Ewaniuk, actress
- Fred Ewanuick, actor
- Tamara Gorski, actress
- Mariya Khomutova, actress and playwright
- Natalie Krill, actress and former dancer
- Jeremy Kushnier, actor/singer, currently in the Chicago cast of the musical Jersey Boys
- Andrew Kushnir, actor, playwright and LGBTQ rights activist
- Mimi Kuzyk, actress
- Phillip Lewitski, actor
- Daniel Maslany, actor, producer, and composer
- Tatiana Maslany, actress, who is best known for playing various roles in Orphan Black
- Caitlynne Medrek, actress
- Stacie Mistysyn, actress (Degrassi)
- Adrian Petriw, voice actor
- Seth Rogen, actor (of Jewish religion)
- William Shatner, actor, who is best known for playing a role in Star Trek (of Jewish religion)
- Adam Smoluk, director, screenwriter and actor
- Katheryn Winnick, actress

=== Musicians ===
- Randy Bachman, musician
- Robbie Bachman, musician
- Tim Bachman, musician
- Paul Brandt, country music artist
- Ron Cahute, musician
- Rick Danko, musician, former bassist and singer of The Band
- Ivan Doroschuk, musician (Men Without Hats)
- Stefan Doroschuk, musician (Men Without Hats)
- Susan Jacks, singer-songwriter
- Gordie Johnson, musician
- Juliette, singer and CBC television host
- Brett Kissel, country music artist
- Chantal Kreviazuk, singer
- Luba, musician
- Victor Mishalow, composer, conductor
- Metro Radomsky, violinist and bandleader
- Nova Rockafeller, rapper, singer-songwriter, music video director
- Tyler Shaw, musician
- Leonid Skirko, opera singer
- Theresa Sokyrka, singer
- Aaron Solowoniuk, musician
- Roman Soltykewych, conductor
- Alex Tanas, musician, drummer of Magic!

=== Other artists and entertainers ===
- Marusya Bociurkiw, filmmaker, writer, scholar, and curator
- Edward Burtynsky, photographer
- Roman Danylo, comedian
- Denys Drozdyuk, ballroom dancer, Season 3 winner of So You Think You Can Dance Canada
- Darren Dutchyshen, sportscaster for TSN
- Luba Goy, comedian
- Natalka Husar, painter
- John Kricfalusi, cartoonist, creator of the Nickelodeon animated series
- William Kurelek, artist
- Oleg Lipchenko, artist
- John Max, photographer
- James Motluk, filmmaker
- Bryan Mudryk, sportscaster for TSN
- Paul Romanuk, sportscaster and writer
- Orest Semchishen, photographer
- Joe Shuster, co-creator of Superman
- Marsha Skrypuch, writer
- Andrea Slobodian, television reporter
- George Stroumboulopoulos, media personality, television host, and podcaster
- Alex Trebek, television game show host (Jeopardy!)
- Meaghan Waller, model
- Daria Werbowy, model

== Business and finance ==
- Cyril Genik, immigration agent
- Bohdan Hawrylyshyn, economist and economic advisor to the Ukrainian government
- Eugene Melnyk, owner of Biovail Pharma and the Ottawa Senators NHL hockey team
- Ray Muzyka, investor, entrepreneur, physician, co-founder of BioWare
- Iwan Pylypow, first Ukrainian Canadian immigrant and pioneer settler
- Michele Romanow, tech entrepreneur

== Government and politics ==
=== Governors General ===
- Ramon John Hnatyshyn, former Governor General of Canada
- Edward Schreyer, former Premier of Manitoba and former Governor General of Canada

=== Lieutenant Governors ===
- Sylvia Fedoruk, Canadian scientist, curler, and former Lieutenant Governor of Saskatchewan
- Peter Liba, former Lieutenant Governor of Manitoba

=== Premiers ===
- Ernie Eves, former Premier of Ontario
- Gary Filmon, former Premier of Manitoba
- Roy Romanow, former Premier of Saskatchewan
- Edward Schreyer, former Premier of Manitoba and former Governor General of Canada
- Ed Stelmach, former Premier of Alberta

=== Others ===
- Yvan Baker, member of parliament
- Mary John Batten, Assembly member for Humboldt
- Edward Bayda, former Chief Justice of Saskatchewan
- Alex Biega, lawyer and author
- James Bezan, member of parliament
- Annie Buller, union organizer
- Norman Cafik, member of parliament
- David Chernushenko, the former senior deputy to the leader of the Green Party of Canada, and a former leadership contestant for that party
- Sid Dutchak, lawyer
- Ed Ewasiuk, labour activist, city councilor
- Taras Ferley, first member of the Legislative Assembly of Manitoba of Ukrainian descent
- Chrystia Freeland, Minister of Foreign Affairs and Deputy Prime Minister
- Larisa Galadza, diplomat and Canadian ambassador to Ukraine from 2019 to 2023
- William Hawrelak, former Mayor of Edmonton
- Ambrose Holowach, member of parliament, businessman, WWII veteran
- Anthony Hlynka, second member of parliament of Ukrainian descent
- Stephen Juba, former Mayor of Winnipeg
- Michael Kawchuk, former mayor of Gilbert Plains
- Gerard Kennedy, Ontario cabinet minister
- MaryAnn Mihychuk, member of parliament, former Canadian Minister of Employment, Workforce, and Labour
- Taras Natyshak, Legislative Assembly of Ontario
- David Orlikow, House of Commons
- Steve Peters, Ontario cabinet minister
- Don Rusnak, member of parliament
- Tymofei Koreichuk, labour organiser
- Michael Sawchuk, legislative assembly
- Jake Sawatzky, member of parliament
- Andrew Shandro, first member of a Canadian legislature of Ukrainian origin, World War I veteran
- Yuri Shymko, member of parliament
- William Skoreyko, member of parliament
- Mark Smerchanski, member of parliament
- John Sopinka, puisne justice, Supreme Court of Canada
- Michael Starr (born Michael Starchewsky), former cabinet minister
- David Tkachuk, Canadian senator
- William Tomyn, legislative assembly
- Judy Wasylycia-Leis, former member of parliament, former Manitoba provincial cabinet minister
- Patrick Weiler, member of parliament
- Borys Wrzesnewskyj, member of parliament
- John Yaremko, longest serving cabinet minister
- Paul Yuzyk, former senator

== Literature and journalism ==
- Stasia Evasuk, writer, journalist
- Janice Kulyk Keefer, novelist, poet
- Myroslaw Stechishin, editor, activist, and public figure
- Savella Stechishin, home economist and writer
- Miriam Toews, writer

== Military ==
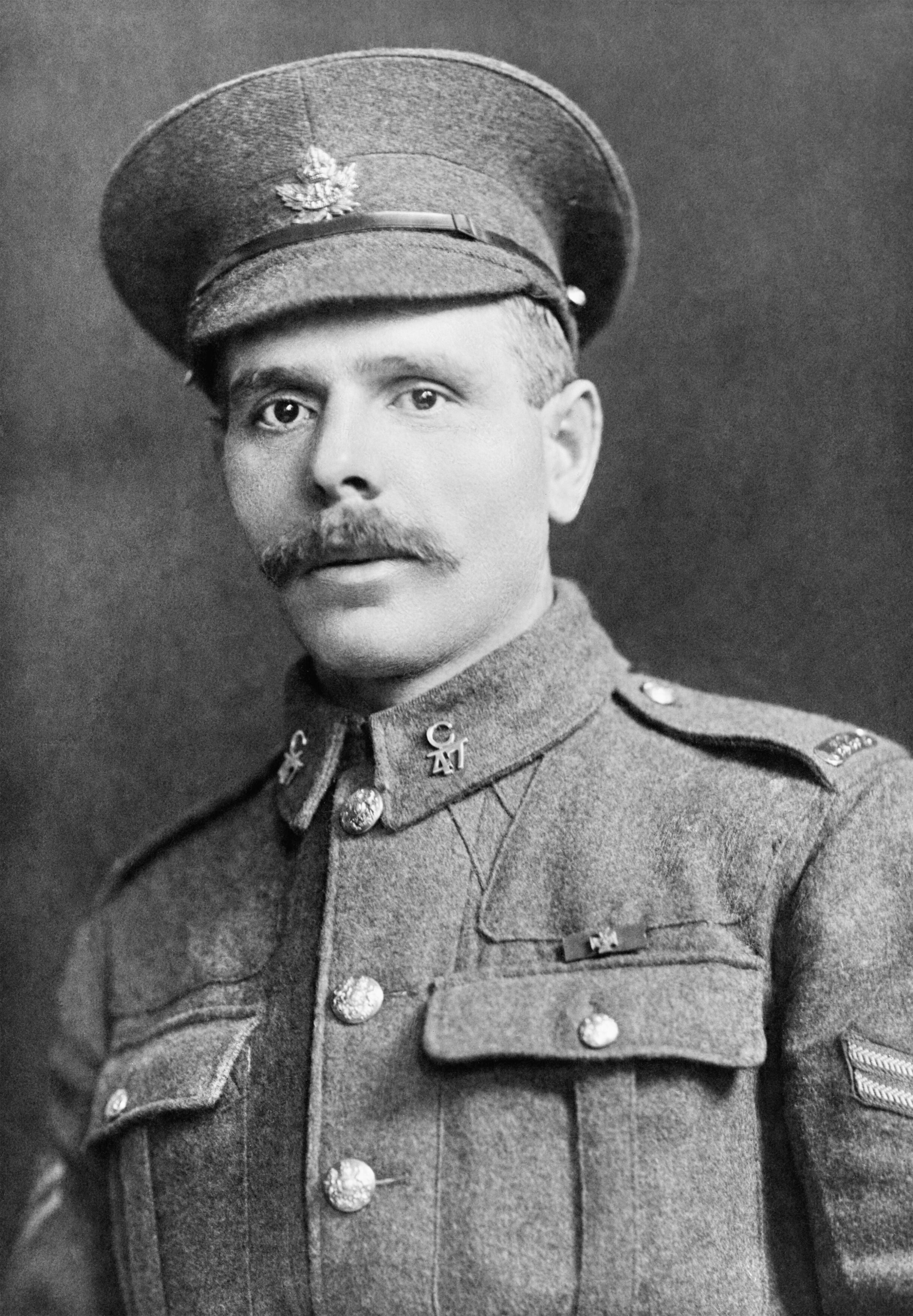
Filip Konowal
- Peter Dmytruk, war hero (World War II), Royal Canadian Air Force
- Yaroslav Hunka, a World War II veteran of the SS Galizien
- Vladimir Katriuk, alleged war criminal
- Filip Konowal, a World War I Victoria Cross recipient
- Paul Wynnyk, Lieutenant General, former Commander of the Canadian Army

== Religion ==
- Nykyta Budka, priest of the Ukrainian Greek Catholic Church
- Metropolitan Wasyly (Fedak), former primate and metropolitan of the Ukrainian Orthodox Church of Canada
- Metropolitan Yurij (Kalistchuk), former primate and metropolitan of the Ukrainian Orthodox Church of Canada
- Metropolitan Michael (Khoroshy), former primate and metropolitan of the Ukrainian Orthodox Church of Canada
- Metropolitan Ilarion (Ohienko), former primate and metropolitan of the Ukrainian Orthodox Church of Canada
- Bishop Andriy (Peshko), Bishop of Toronto and of the Eastern Eparchy of the Ukrainian Orthodox Church of Canada
- Metropolitan Hilarion (Rudnyk), primate and metropolitan of the Ukrainian Orthodox Church of Canada
- Patriarch Mstyslav (Skrypnyk), former primate and archbishop of the Ukrainian Orthodox Church of Canada
- Metropolitan John (Stinka), former primate and metropolitan of the Ukrainian Orthodox Church of Canada
- Stephanie Petryk Potoski, received Pro Ecclesia et Pontifice from Pope Paul VI in 1964
- Severian Yakymyshyn, Catholic hierarch

== Science and technology ==
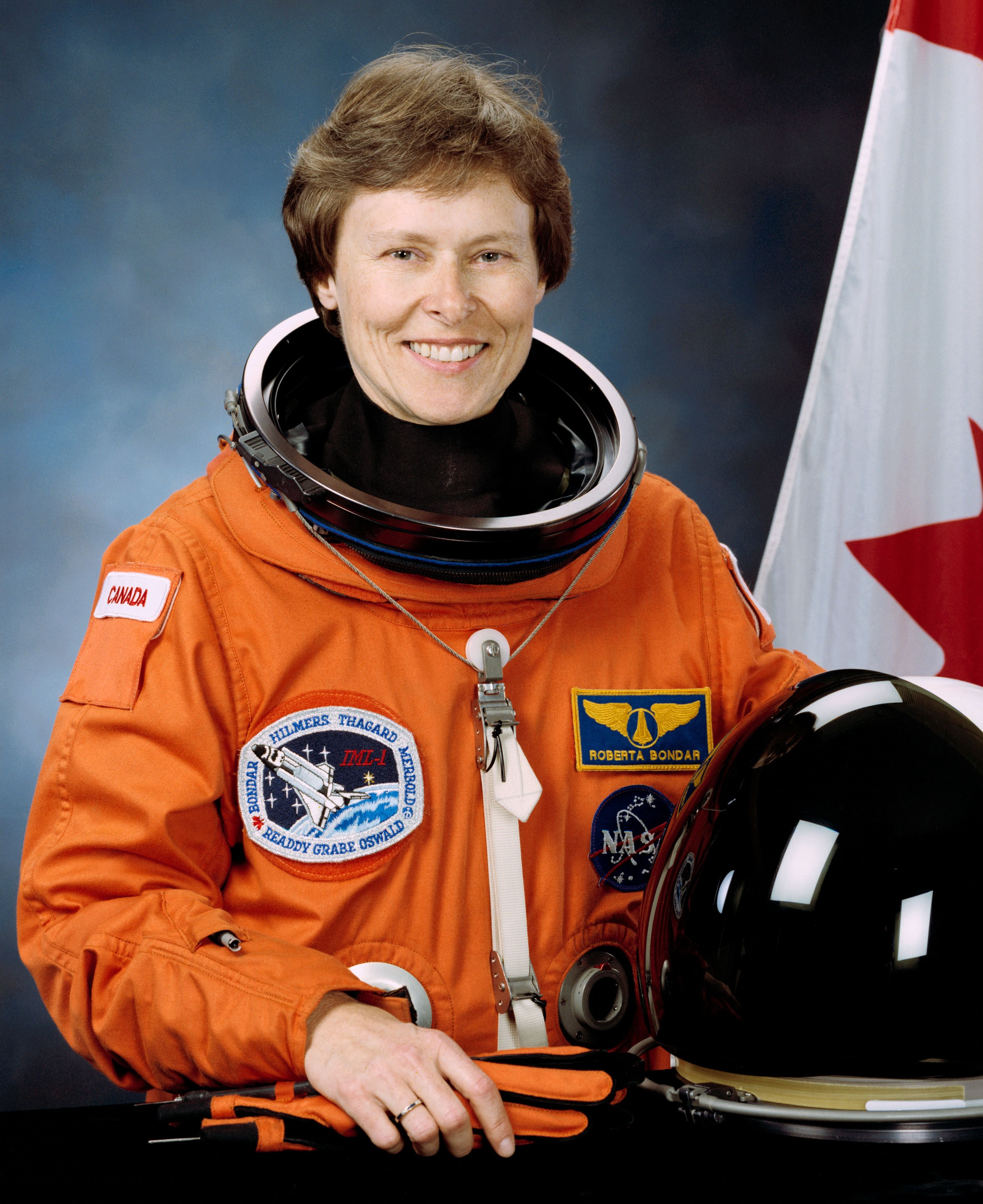
Roberta Bondar

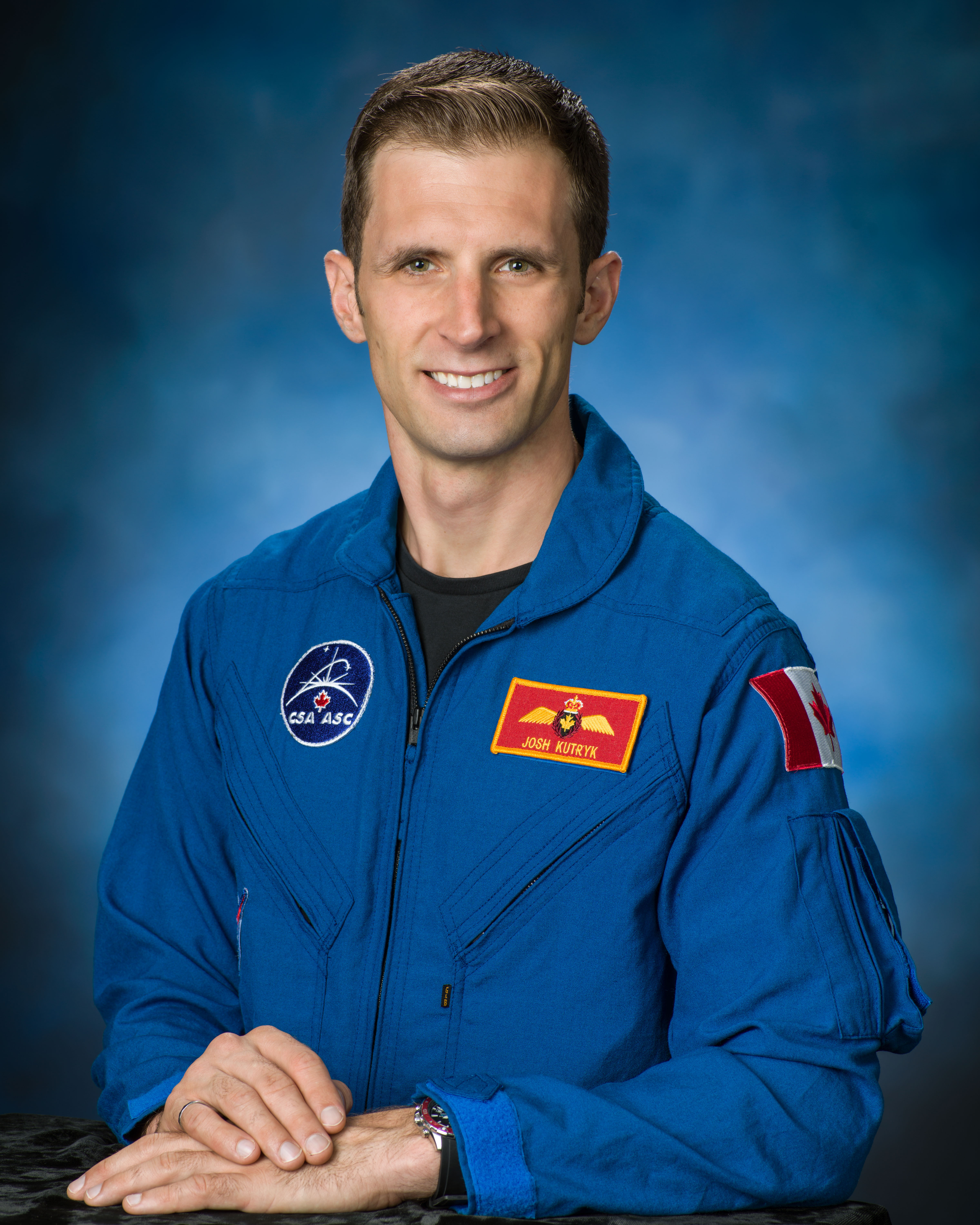
Joshua Kutryk
- Albert Bandura, psychologist
- David Baszucki, entrepreneur, co-founder and CEO of ROBLOX
- Roberta Bondar, astronaut
- Dmytro Cipywnyk, physician
- Sylvia Fedoruk, Canadian scientist, curler, and former Lieutenant Governor of Saskatchewan
- Isydore Hlynka, biochemist, Ukrainian Canadian community leader
- Joshua Kutryk, astronaut
- George S. N. Luckyj, scholar of Ukrainian literature
- Vladimir Mackiw, inventor and industrialist
- Yaroslav Pustovyi, astronaut
- Lubomyr Romankiw, scientist, Ph.D. degrees in metallurgy and materials
- Jaroslav Rudnyckyj, linguist, a founding father of Canadian multiculturalism

== Sports ==
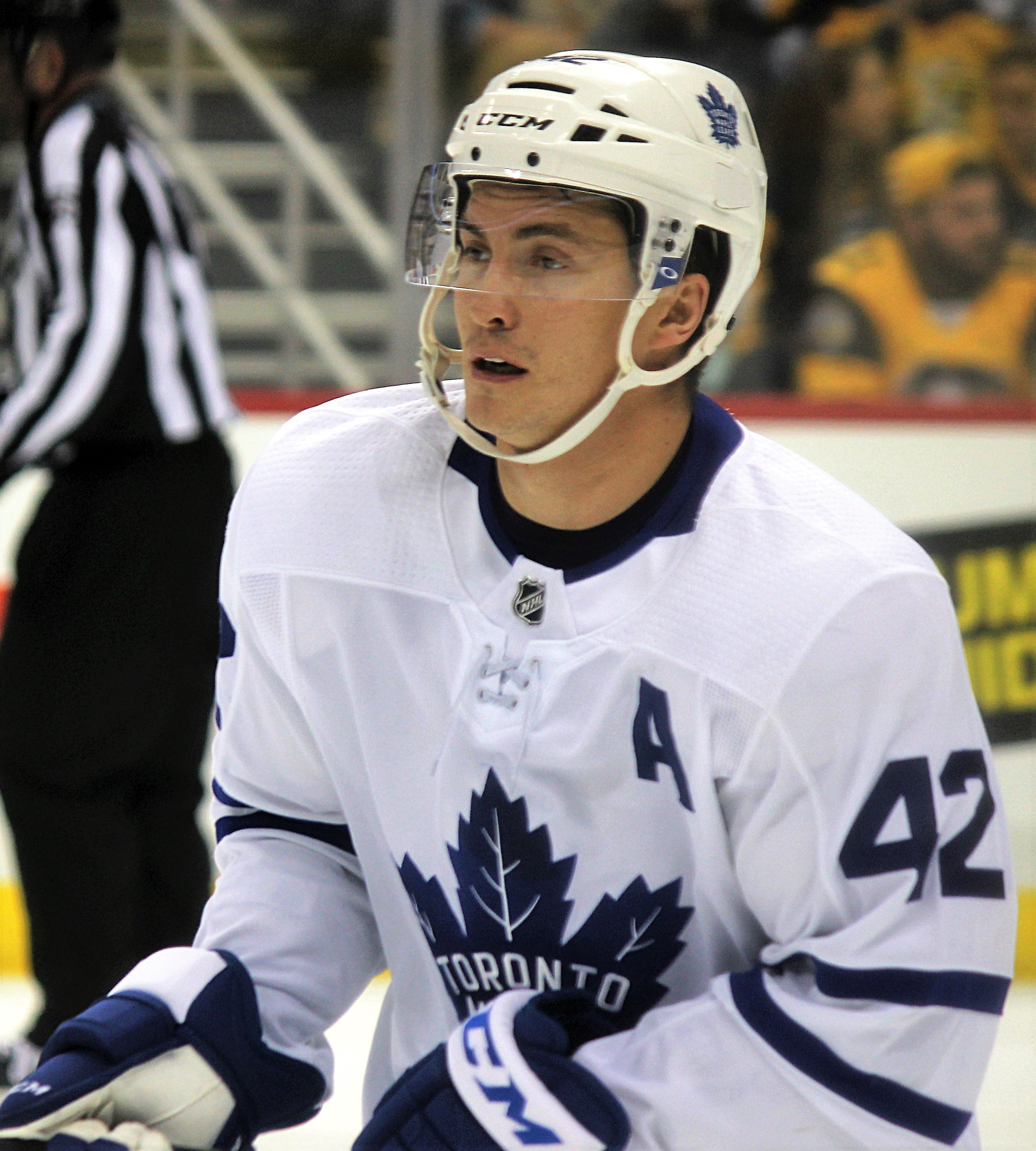
Tyler Bozak

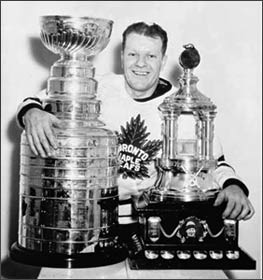
Turk Broda

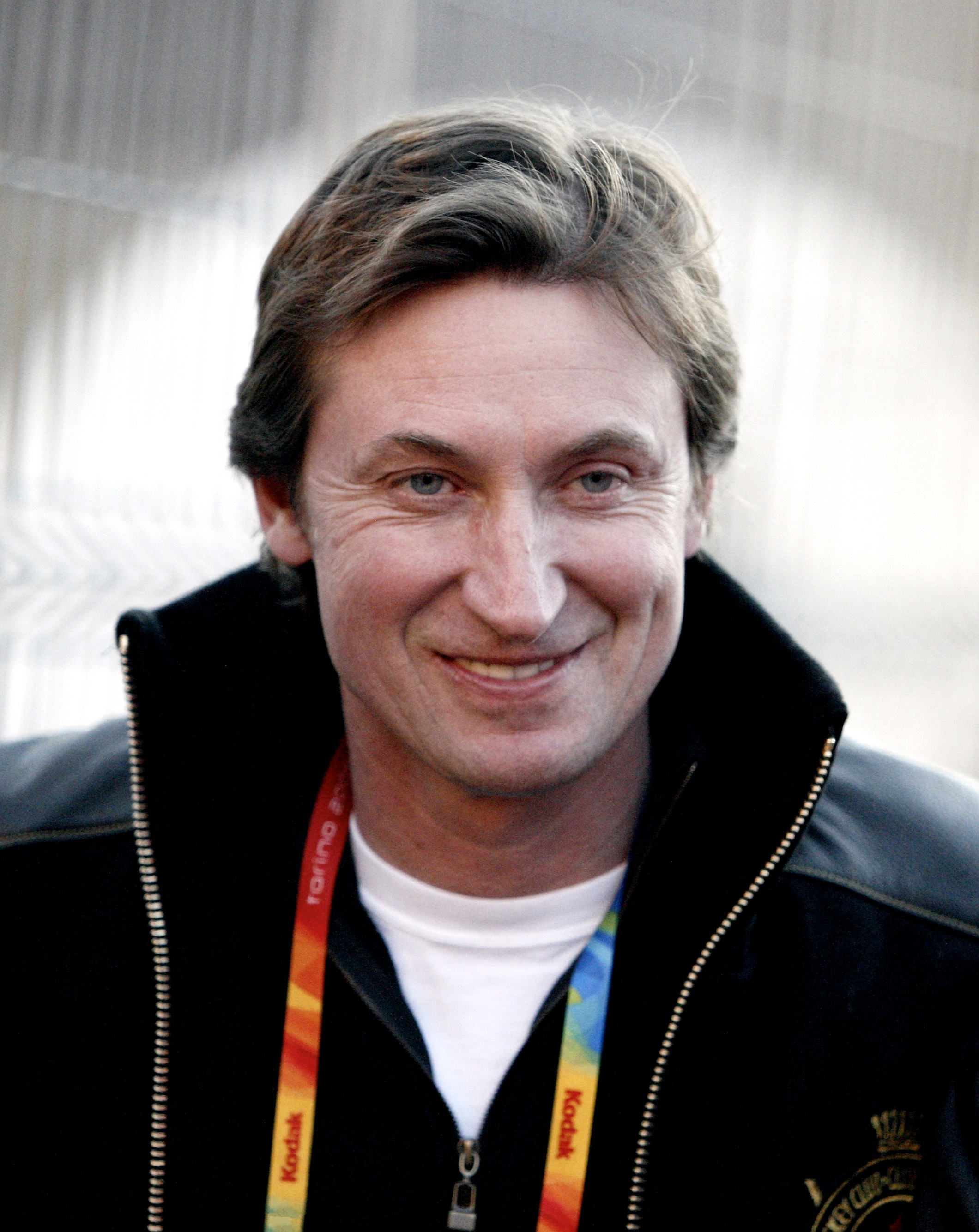
Wayne Gretzky

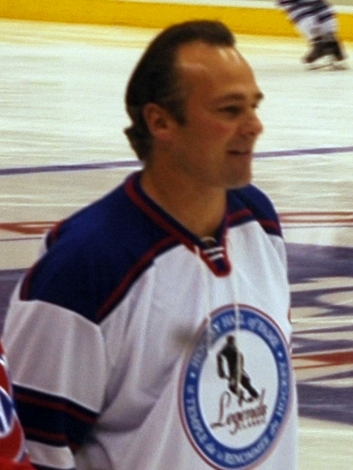
Dale Hawerchuk

=== Curling ===
- Kerry Burtnyk
- Sylvia Fedoruk
- Randy Ferbey
- Walter Hubchick
- Alison Kreviazuk
- Cheryl Kreviazuk
- Lynn Kreviazuk
- Orest Meleschuk
- Chris Scalena
- Ernie Slyziuk
- Ed Werenich
- Mike Woloschuk

=== Gridiron football ===
- Zenon Andrusyshyn
- Lance Chomyc
- Duane Dmytryshyn
- Bud Korchak
- Mike Kostiuk
- Bill Manchuk
- Bronko Nagurski (also professional wrestler)
- Danny Nykoluk
- Michael Palmer
- Darwin Semotiuk

=== Ice hockey ===
- Gene Achtymichuk
- Randy Andreachuk
- Akim Aliu
- Peter Ambroziak
- Glenn Anderson
- Dave Andreychuk
- Dave Babych
- Wayne Babych
- Stan Baluik
- Jeff Bandura
- Bill Barilko
- Murray Baron
- Scott Basiuk
- David Bararuk
- Lonny Bohonos
- Mike Bossy
- Johnny Bower
- Larry Bolonchuk
- Andrew Bodnarchuk
- Johnny Boychuk
- Zach Boychuk
- Darren Boyko
- Tyler Bozak
- Turk Broda
- Kyle Brodziak
- Johnny Bucyk
- Mike Busniuk
- Ron Busniuk
- Jeff Chychrun
- Colton Dach
- Kirby Dach
- Gerald Diduck
- Ed Diachuk
- Devan Dubnyk
- Ken Daneyko
- Pat Elynuik
- Travis Ewanyk
- Terry Ewasiuk
- Brad Farynuk
- Mike Fedorko
- Bernie Federko
- Dean Fedorchuk
- Todd Fedoruk
- Taylor Fedun
- Brent Fedyk
- Ron Garwasiuk
- Alexander Godynyuk
- Wayne Gretzky
- Dwayne Gylywoychuk
- Matthew Halischuk
- Steven Halko
- Nick Harbaruk
- Dale Hawerchuk
- Neil Hawryliw
- Jayce Hawryluk
- Shaun Heshka
- Darcy Hordichuk
- Doug Houda
- Kelly Hrudey
- Tony Hrkac
- Jim Hrycuik
- Scott Humeniuk
- Mike Kaszycki
- Boris Katchouk
- Orest Kindrachuk
- Morgan Klimchuk
- Julian Klymkiw
- Seamus Kotyk
- Taran Kozun
- Roger Kortko
- Scott Kosmachuk
- Mike Krushelnyski
- Cody Kunyk
- Merve Kuryluk
- Curtis Leschyshyn
- Jake Leschyshyn
- Danny Lewicki
- Dave Lewis
- Ross Lupaschuk
- Jett Luchanko
- Gary Lupul
- Joffrey Lupul
- Brett Lysak
- Cale Makar
- Taylor Makar
- Clint Malarchuk
- Denton Mateychuk
- Richard Matvichuk
- George Maneluk
- Mike Maneluk
- Brian Marchinko
- Dave Marcinyshyn
- Ray Martynuik
- Dennis Maruk
- Gerry Melnyk
- Larry Melnyk
- Art Michaluk
- Dave Michayluk
- John Michaluk
- John Miszuk
- Nick Mickoski
- Bill Mosienko
- Kevin Nastiuk
- Eric Nesterenko
- Mike Nykoluk
- Zack Ostapchuk
- Travis Oleksuk
- Jamie Oleksiak
- Bill Oleschuk
- Brinson Pasichnuk
- Colton Parayko
- James Patrick
- Nolan Patrick
- Steve Patrick
- Walt Poddubny
- Alexei Ponikarovsky
- Metro Prystai
- Mark Pysyk
- Russ Romaniuk
- Lindy Ruff
- Marty Ruff
- Rocky Saganiuk
- Bryce Salvador
- TJ Sakaluk
- Larry Sacharuk
- Riley Sawchuk
- Terry Sawchuk
- Zach Sawchenko
- Dave Semenko
- Zachary Senyshyn
- David Schlemko
- Eddie Shack
- Jack Shewchuk
- Tammy Shewchuk-Dryden
- Gary Shuchuk
- Wade Skolney
- Dennis Sobchuk
- Gene Sobchuk
- Vic Stasiuk
- Morris Stefaniw
- Vicky Sunohara
- Darryl Sydor
- Joey Tetarenko
- Grant Tkachuk
- Daniel Tkaczuk
- Walt Tkaczuk
- Jordin Tootoo
- Elmer Vasko
- Rick Vasko
- Alexander Vasilevski
- Mike Wanchuk
- Darcy Wakaluk
- Alexis Woloschuk
- Steve Witiuk
- Dale Yakiwchuk
- Gary Yaremchuk
- Ken Yaremchuk
- Carter Yakemchuk
- Mike Yaschuk
- Miles Zaharko
- Ed Zeniuk
- Harry Zolnierczyk

=== Soccer ===
- Haidar Al-Shaïbani
- Brittany Baxter
- Terry Bidiak
- Maksym Kowal
- Nicole Kozlova
- Sergei Kozlovskiy
- Leigh Sembaluk

=== Other sports ===
- Nadiia Bashynska, ice dancer
- Patricia Bezzoubenko - rhythmic gymnast
- Fedor Bohatirchuk, chess player
- Tebor Brosch, boxer
- George Bossy, sprint canoer
- Andy Boychuk, long-distance runner
- Don Domansky, track and field athlete
- Wilf Homenuik, golfer
- Taras Hryb, professional wrestler
- Chris Jericho, professional wrestler
- John Katan, professional wrestler
- Kristen Kit, paralympian
- Ken Kotyk, bobsledder
- Lucas Makowsky, speed skater
- Joanne Malar, swimmer
- Denis Margalik, figure skater
- Michael Michalchuk, snowboarder
- Anastasiya Muntyanu, rhythmic gymnast
- Kelly Olynyk, basketball player
- Isabela Onyshko, artistic gymnast
- Bill Sawchuk, swimmer
- Katherine Sebov, tennis player
- Kelly Stefanyshyn, swimmer
- Kevin Tkachuk, rugby union player
- Rachelle Viinberg, rower
- Larisa Yurkiw, alpine skier

== See also ==
- List of Ukrainian Americans
- List of Ukrainians
