= Museum of Ukrainian Diaspora =

Commemorative museum in Kyiv

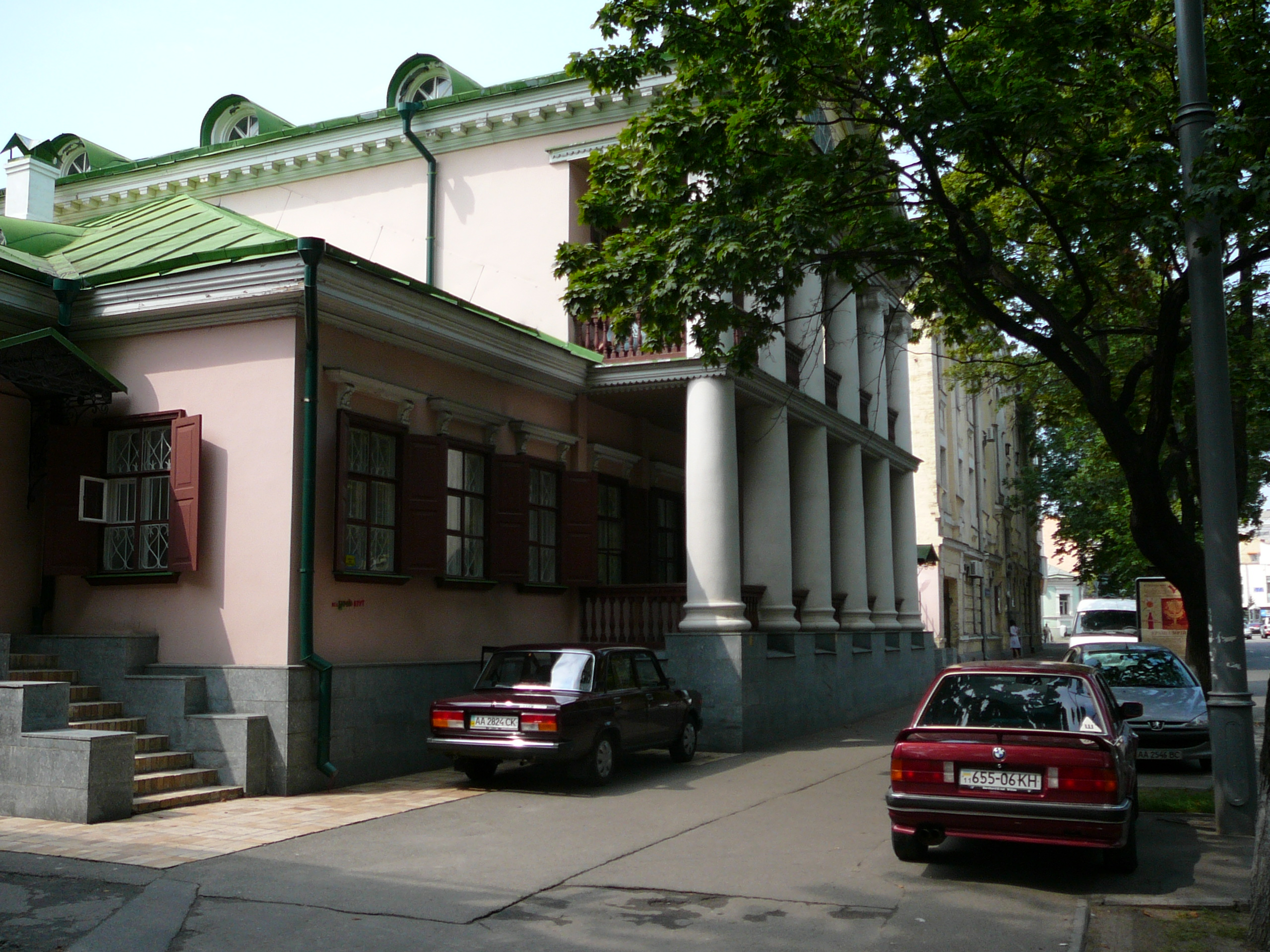
- Former name: Museum of Cultural Heritage
- Established: May 29, 1999
- Location: Kniaziv Ostrozkykh St, 40Б, Kyiv, Ukraine, 01015
- Coordinates: 50.4341°N 30.54482°E
- Type: History museum
- Collections: Art, Archives, Cultural objects
- Collection size: 20,000
- Founders: Volodymyr Tykhenko and Oksana Pidsukha
- Director: Anna Leksina
- Website: diaspora.com.ua

The Museum of Ukrainian Diaspora (Ukrainian: Музей української діаспори, romanized: Muzei ukrainskoi diaspory), formerly known as the Museum of Cultural Heritage, in Kyiv, Ukraine, is dedicated to the history and cultural heritage of the Ukrainian diaspora, from the late 19th century to the present day.

Founded in 1999, the museum is housed in a late 18th-century mansion in the historical Pechersk district in Kyiv. Eight exhibition rooms display more than 20,000 art, archival and other objects, the majority donated by "institutions and private collectors from Canada, the United States, and Australia," as part of its mission to "strengthen national identity and Ukrainian unity by preserving the history and cultural heritage of the Ukrainian diaspora."

Exhibits build individual and group profiles through photographic images, documents, personal effects, albums, books, art, and other artifacts. Among them are bios of actress Vera Farmiga, former Deputy Prime Minister of Canada Chrystia Freeland, U.S. Congresswoman Marcy Kaptur, and historian Volodymyr Kubijovyč, editor-in-chief of the Encyclopedia of Ukraine. The museum also features work by artist David Burliuk, the Krychevsky art dynasty, and many other artists, musicians, and writers. Two especially prominent exhibits focus on ballet master Serge Lifar and aviation designer Igor Sikorsky. The diaspora's fight for the restoration of Ukrainian statehood, detailing contributions from the Ukrainian National Association (Canada) and other groups is also documented and displayed.

In 2022, after the Russian invasion, the museum created a Virtual Ukrainian Diaspora Museum, stating that:

The Virtual Museum of Ukrainian Diaspora is an educational and research web platform created to publish the digitized collection of the Museum of Ukrainian Diaspora and its partners, disseminate knowledge about the history and cultural heritage of global Ukrainians, the activities of Ukrainian institutions around the world and prominent personalities of Ukrainian origin, publish scientific and educational materials on diaspora issues, and inform about events and news in the global Ukrainian world.

== Art and science ==
Several halls of the museum are dedicated to the work of immigrant artists Lyudmyla Morozova, Oleksa Bulavnytsky, Vadym Dobrolizh among others, along with avant-garde artists David Burliuk, Oksana Pavlenko, known for her Boychuk links, and "Painter's Workshop" artist Alexander Shevchenko.

There is also a collection dedicated to the scattered artistic Krychevsky dynasty, some of whom lived in France, others in the United States, and still others in Venezuela. Pictures and sketches depict Vasyl Krychevsky, while watercolors portray Mykola Krychevsky and Kateryna Krychevska-Rosandich, in addition to several works of Vasyl Krychevsky, Jr.

Memorial rooms trace the history of notable former residents of Kyiv, including aviation pioneer Igor Sikorsky, pianist Vladimir Horowitz, conductor-composer Oleksandr Koshetz, and many others. The most prominent exhibit is dedicated to the life and work of famed ballet master Serge Lifar.

A permanent exhibit showcases aircraft designer Igor Sikorsky, and includes "models of his innovative airplanes, blending engineering marvels with historical insights."

== Political history ==
The museum also has exhibits on the Ukrainian diaspora groups that fought for the restoration of Ukrainian statehood (1918–1921), such as the Ukrainian National Association in Canada, the World Congress of Ukrainians, and the scouting organization Plast.

== See also ==
- History of Ukraine
- List of Ukrainian Americans
- Ukrainian Australians
- List of Ukrainian Canadians
- Ukrainian American Archives and Museum of Detroit
- Ukrainian diaspora
- The Ukrainian Museum of Canada
- Ukrainian National Museum (Chicago)
- The Ukrainian Museum (New York)

== Sources ==
- Museums of Kyiv. Guidebook, 2005. P. 71.
