= Stechishin =

Stechishin (Ukrainian: Стечишин) is a surname in Ukraine and Canada.

== List ==
People with the surname include:

- Julian Stechishin (1895–1971), Ukrainian-Canadian community leader; brother of Michael Stechishin and Myroslaw Stechishin and husband of Savella Stechishin
- Michael Stechishin (1888–1964), Ukrainian-Canadian judge and community leader, brother of Myroslaw Stechishin and Julian Stechishin
- Myroslaw Stechishin (1883–1947), Ukrainian-Canadian editor and public figure
- Savella Stechishin (1903–2002), Ukrainian-Canadian home economist and writer
