= USDP =

USDP may stand for:

- Ukrainian Social Democratic Party (Canada)
- United States Democratic Party, one of the main two political parties in the United States
- Union Solidarity and Development Party, a political party in Myanmar (Burma)
- Unified Software Development Process
