= Alex Biega =

Alex Biega may refer to:

- Alex Biega (ice hockey) (born 1988), Canadian professional ice hockey player
- Alex Biega (lawyer) (c. 1922–2004), Canadian lawyer and author
