= Ukrainian Social Democratic Party =

Ukrainian Social Democratic Party may refer to:

- Ukrainian Social Democratic Party (1899), a political party in Galicia
- Ukraine – Forward!, established in 1998 as Ukrainian Social Democratic Party, renamed in 2012
- Social Democratic Party of Ukraine (united) (registered 1996)
- Social Democratic Party of Ukraine (registered 1994)
- Ukrainian Social Democratic Party (Canada)
