= Katie Kozak =

Canadian visual artist

- Born: b. 1985
- Education: Emily Carr University of Art and Design (BFA) Simon Fraser University, School for the Contemporary Arts (MFA)
- Known for: Visual art, photography
- Movement: Contemporary art

Kathryn Kozak (born 1985; alternatively Katie Kozak) is a Canadian contemporary visual artist based out of Vancouver, BC. Her multi-media works combine film, photography, collage and sculpture.

== Early life and education ==
Kozak was raised in Denare Beach, SK. She is a queer artist of Métis and Ukrainian settler descent, with ancestral roots in the Métis communities of St. François Xavier and Boggy Creek, MB.

Kozak holds a Bachelor of Science in biology from the University of Victoria and attended Emily Carr University of Art and Design from 2009 through 2012. She later completed an MFA at the School for Contemporary Arts at Simon Fraser University in Vancouver, BC.

== Career ==
In 2012, Kozak began a long-term partnership with fellow Saskatchewan based contemporary artist Lucien Durow with whom she has since collaborated on multiple exhibitions and art projects.

Between 2012 and 2013, Kozak and Durow conducted a self-directed residency based out of the home of Kozak's 80-year-old Canadian-Ukrainian grandmother, Sophie Ostrowski, in Creighton, Saskatchewan. The residency produced a variety of multi-media art pieces created using a household scanner that were later described and re-interpreted by Ostrowski for a 2014 exhibit in Dunlop Art Gallery in Regina. The success of Baba's House then led to larger and equally popular iterations of the exhibit at Moosejaw Museum and Art Gallery 2015–2016, the Ukrainian Museum of Canada in 2015, and NorVA Centre in Manitoba in 2017. In 2014, ARTINFO Canada named Durey on their "30 Under 30" list and cited his collaborations with Kozak on Baba's House as a notable indicator of his future success.

Kozak and Durow have since gone on to collaborate on multiple exhibits across Canada including What You May Call (2013), Snow Gallery (2014), Candelabra (2019), Endless Summer (2023), and Aporia (Notes to a Medium) (2024).

Kozak displays most of her work at small local galleries in Saskatchewan and British Columbia, but has also participated in larger group exhibits throughout Canada.

=== Themes ===
Kozak's early works, such as Baba's House, drew on her Ukrainian ancestry and explored themes of tradition memory, family and connection. Her more recent works draw inspiration from her father's Métis ancestry and explore themes around connectivity to land, relationships, ritual and traces. Many of her pieces incorporate discarded, borrowed, or recycled materials received from friends or family and explore topics of ephemerality and a return to nature.

== Work ==
=== Residencies ===
- Artist in Residence, Lobe Spatial Sound Studio, Vancouver, BC - September 2022
- Sointula Art Shed, Sointula, BC - 2018 - 2019

=== Major exhibitions ===
- Aporia (Notes to a Medium), Morris and Helen Belkin Art Gallery, Vancouver, BC, Jan 12, 2024 – Apr 14, 2024
- Endless Summer, Gordon Smith Gallery, North Vancouver, BC, Apr 15, 2023 – Jun 17, 2023
- Vancouver special: disorientations and echo, Vancouver Art Gallery, Vancouver, BC, May 29, 2021, to January 3, 2022
- Snow Gallery, Dunlop Art Gallery, Regina, SK, February 2014
- Scanning a life: Baba's House, Dunlop Art Gallery, Regina, SK, 2014

== Related Links ==
- Katie Kozak Flickr Portfolio - https://www.flickr.com/photos/136903628@N08/albums/72157659590047101/
