= Nijmegen Devils =

- City: Nijmegen, Netherlands
- League: Eredivisie; 2021-Present; BeNe League; 2015-2020; Eerste Divisie; 2012-2015; Eredivisie; 1989-2011; Dutch Cup
- Founded: 1968
- Home arena: Triavium (capacity: 1,450)
- Colours
- Head coach: Chris Eimers
- Asst. coach: Ray Gallagher
- Website: nijmegendevils.nl

The Nijmegen Devils are an ice hockey club in Nijmegen, Netherlands. They play in the Eredivisie, the top league of IJshockey Nederland, the official governing body of ice hockey in the Netherlands. For five seasons, the Devils played in the BeNe League, a joint Belgian and Dutch league. Previously, the team played in the semi-professional Dutch Eredivisie where they were the 9-time national champions.

Since joining the newly formed Eredivisie in 2021, the Devils have become champions twice. With the re-establishment of the Eredivisie as the top Dutch competition in the 2025–26 season, the Devils were able to claim their tenth national championship.

Home games are played at the Triavium. As of the 2025–26 season, the team's main sponsor is Dakkapel Direct.

== History ==
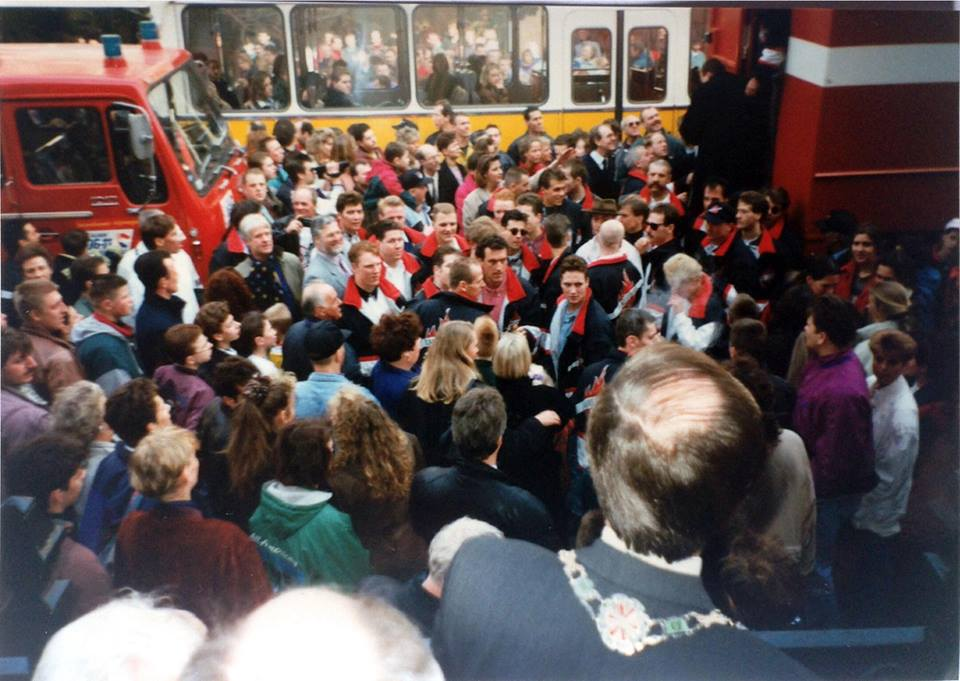
The 1993 champions outside the Nijmegen town hall

Ice hockey in Nijmegen began in 1968, with the Nijmegen Tigers winning its first national championship in 1984. At the end of the 1980s, several players moved to Rotterdam to join the short-lived Rotterdam Panda's. Beginning in the early 1990s, financial difficulties hurt the Nijmegen Tigers, forcing the team to dissolve and reform in 1994. In 2003, the Tigers went bankrupt. The Nijmegen Emperors joined the Eredivisie in 2004, winning the national championship in 2006. However, the Emperors also went bankrupt in 2006. In 2007, the Devils joined the league with a title sponsor. In the 2009–10 season, the Devils won the Cup (In Dutch, "Beker"), an annual tournament of Eredivisie teams played before the beginning of the regular season, finished the regular season in first place, and won the national championship.

== Season results ==
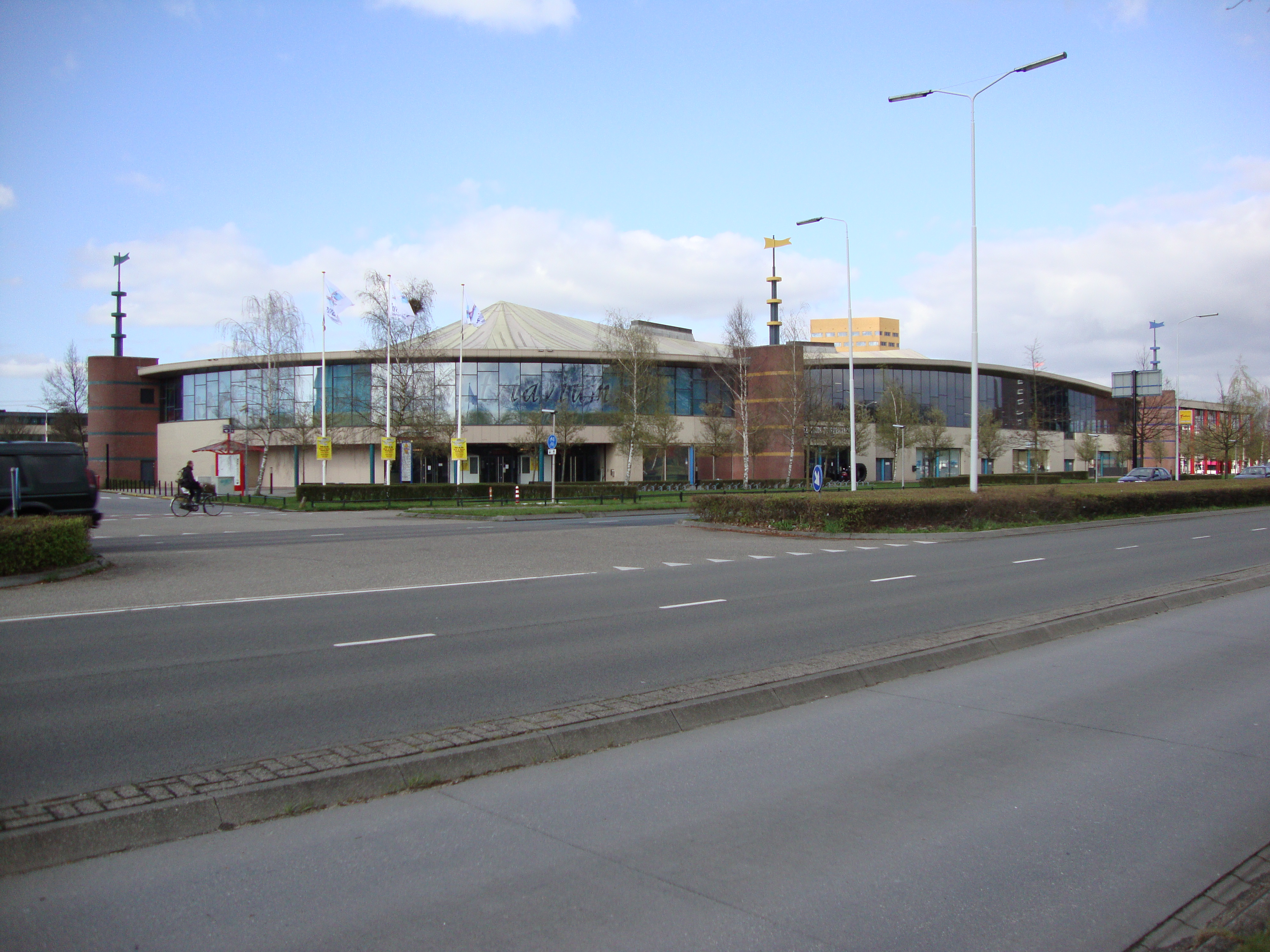
The Triavium ice rink

Note: GP = Games played, W = Wins, OTW = Overtime Wins, OTL = Overtime Losses, L = Losses, GF = Goals for, GA = Goals against, Pts = Points

Season	GP	W	OTW	OTL	L	GF	GA	Pts	Finish	Playoffs
2025-26	22	20	1	1	0	190	47	63	1st, Eredivisie	National Champion (3-0)
2024-25	22	22	0	0	0	163	41	66	1st, Eredivisie	Eredivisie Champion (3-0)
2023-24	22	17	1	2	2	137	58	55	2nd, Eredivisie	Final loss
2022-23	24	2	0	1	21	65	156	7	12th, Eredivisie	Did not make playoffs
2021-22	8	5	0	1	2	38	28	16	2nd, Eerste Divisie	Eerste Divisie Champion
2021–22	6	3	0	0	3	26	28	9	5th, Eredivisie South	Eerste Divisie Qualification
2020–21									Season Cancelled	
2019–20	20	10	0	2	10	124	63	32	5th, BeNe League	Playoffs Interrupted
2018-19	22	13	1	0	8	131	74	41	6th, BeNe League	Quarterfinal loss
2017–18	24	15	0	1	8	113	95	46	5th, BeNe League	Semifinal loss
2016-17	19	1	0	4	14	42	106	7	7th, BeNe League	Did not make playoffs
2015-16	22	8	3	0	11	63	83	30	4th, BeNe League	Quarterfinal loss
2014-15	18	9	0	1	8	56	50	19	5th, Eerste Divisie	Final loss
2013-14	14	9	1	0	4	68	48	20	3rd, Eerste Divisie	Final loss
2012-13	18	7	1	2	8	60	67	25	5th, Eerste Divisie	Did not make playoffs
2011–12	18	17	0	0	1	183	23	51	1st, Eerste Divisie	
2010–11	28	16	1	1	10	133	115	51	4th, North Sea Cup	Lost semi-finals to Tilburg (3-1)
2009–10	28	18	3	3	4	128	80	63	1st, Eredivisie	Won National Championship (3-0)
2008–09	24	12	2	1	9	92	83	39	4th, Eredivisie	Lost semi-finals to Tilburg (3-2), Won Beker Cup
2007–08	24	3	2	1	18	45	107	14	6th, Eredivisie	Did not qualify

== Roster ==
Updated September 17, 2026.

Goaltenders
Number		Player	Catches	Acquired	Place of Birth
31	(Netherlands)	Midas Zaitsoff	L	2024	Amsterdam, Netherlands
33	(Netherlands)	Juliën van Nes	L	2024	Den Haag, Netherlands

Defencemen
Number		Player	Shoots	Acquired	Place of Birth
2	(United States)	Derek Knetter (C)	L	2023	Wausau, Wisconsin
5	(Netherlands)	Giovanni Vogelaar	R	2026	Den Haag, Netherlands
17	(Netherlands)	Boet van Gestel	R	2026	Goirle, Netherlands
19	(Netherlands)	James Töpfer	L	2026
26	(Canada)	Will Dow-Kenny	R	2025	Abbotsford, British Columbia
55	(Canada)	Nick Prestia	R	2026	Niagara Falls, Ontario
74	(Netherlands)	Ninho Hessels	L	2026	Goirle, Netherlands

Forwards
Number		Player	Shoots	Acquired	Place of Birth
9	(Netherlands)	Kevin Bruijsten (A)	L	2024	Nijmegen, Netherlands
10	(Latvia)	Antons Trastasenkovs	L	2025	Riga, Latvia
12	(Netherlands)	Floris Vooren	L	2023	Nijmegen, Netherlands
15	(Netherlands)	Yan Kokke	L	2025	Nijmegen, Netherlands
20	(Netherlands)	Mitch Bruijsten	L	2023	Nijmegen, Netherlands
22	(Netherlands)	Renzo van Brink	R	2023	Nijmegen, Netherlands
41	(Netherlands)	Levi Houkes (A)	L	2023	Nijmegen, Netherlands
60	(Netherlands)	Mitchel van Holten	R	2026	Nijmegen, Netherlands
71	(Netherlands)	Tijn Jacobs	L	2026	Tilburg, Netherlands
80	(Lithuania)	Martynas Grinius	L	2025	Vilnius, Lithuania
88	(Netherlands)	Eef Gerritsen	L	2023	Nijmegen, Netherlands
97	(Netherlands)	Makar Korotchenko	L	2024	Nijmegen, Netherlands

== Championships ==
Eredivisie National Championships

As Nijmegen Devils (3): 2025-26, 2024-25*, 2009-10
As Nijmegen Emperors (1): 2005-06
As Nijmegen Tigers (7): 1999-00, 1998-99, 1997-98, 1996-97, 1992-93, 1987-88, 1983-84

*The Central European Hockey League was recognized as the top league of the Netherlands from 2015-16 until 2024-25, therefore, the Eredivisie champion of 2024-25 did not earn the distinction of national champion.

Beker van Nederland (Dutch Cup)

As Nijmegen Devils (2): 2018-19, 2008-09
As Nijmegen Tigers (2): 1998-99, 1995-96
As Spitman Nijmegen (1): 1988-89

Ron Berteling Schaal (Ron Berteling Shield)

As Nijmegen Devils (1): 2010

== Former players ==
- (Canada) Aaron McLeod
- (Canada) TJ Sakaluk
- (Canada) Brad Smulders
- (Morocco) (Netherlands) Akim Ramoul
- (United States) Phil Aucoin
- (Netherlands) Nick de Jong
- (Netherlands) Ben Tijnagel
- (Netherlands) Jan Bruijsten
- (Serbia) (Netherlands) Alex Andjelic
