= Orest Soltykevych =

Ukrainian-Canadian conductor (born 1958)

Orest Soltykevych (Ukrainian: Орест Солтикевич; born 1958) is a Ukrainian-Canadian conductor, formerly conducting the Ukrainian Male Chorus of Edmonton and the Verkhovyna Ukrainian Choir. Orest is also a radio program announcer and producer at the CKUA Radio Network. Orest is the son of Roman Soltykewych.

== Personal life ==
Orest was born and raised in Edmonton, Canada, where he completed Grade 9 of the Royal Conservatory Piano. He went on to attend the University of Alberta, where he completed a Bachelor of Education degree with a major in secondary music.

After the conclusion of his studies, Orest starting working for Edmonton Public Schools in various capacities, including as a computer studies teacher, instrumental music teacher, assistant principal, principal and substitute teacher.

Orest is married to Lesia Soltykevych, and has two sons, Roman and Cassian, and one daughter, Tamara. Orest's father, Roman, was a choir conductor with the Ukrainian Dnipro Ensemble of Edmonton.

== Musical career ==
In 1984 Orest became the founding conductor of the Ukrainian Male Chorus of Edmonton. Under his leadership the choir has embarked on a number of tours and performances in Canada, as well as internationally in Ukraine, Poland, Austria, Latvia, Spain, Portugal and the United States.

Starting in 1986, Orest began conducting the Ukrainian Youth Association of Canada (CYMK) choir, which he led for 7 years. He also spent three years as the conductor of the St Andrews's Ukrainian Orthodox Parish Choir. Orest is currently the director of the St John the Baptist Ukrainian Orthodox Cathedral Choir in Edmonton.

Over the course of his career, Orest has also performed with the Dnipro choir, the Richard Eaton singers, the Da Camera Singers and the Kappella Kyrie Slavic Chamber Choir.

Orest spent ten years serving as a member of the Ukrainian Music Society, including acting as the society's president for a period of time.

== Radio program hosting ==
In 1999 Orest founded the “Sounds Ukrainian” radio program at the CJSR radio station based out of the University of Alberta which he hosted for a total of seven years.

Orest currently hosts the Raising Voices classical vocal and choral music programs on the CKUA Radio Network in Alberta.

== Awards ==
In 2005 Orest was awarded the Hetman Award by the Ukrainian Canadian Congress – Alberta Provincial Council for his many years of work in the Ukrainian community.
