= CKUA Radio Network =

Canadian community radio station in Alberta

CKUA
- Alberta; Canada
- Frequency: See transmitters
- Branding: CKUA Radio

Programming
- Format: Community radio

Ownership
- Owner: CKUA Radio Foundation

History
- First air date: November 21, 1927
- Former frequencies: 580 kHz
- Call sign meaning: University of Alberta

Technical information
- Class: see chart
- Power: see chart

Links
- Website: ckua.com

CKUA Radio is a Canadian donor-funded community radio station based in Edmonton, Alberta. Originally located on the campus of the University of Alberta in Edmonton (hence the UA of the call letters), it was the first public broadcaster in Canada when it began broadcasting in 1927. It now broadcasts from studios in downtown Edmonton, and as of fall 2016 has added a studio in Calgary's National Music Centre. CKUA's primary station is CKUA-FM, located on 94.9 FM in Edmonton, and the station operates fifteen rebroadcasters to serve the remainder of the province.

As of February 28, 2021, CKUA is the 13th-most-listened-to radio station in the Edmonton market according to a PPM data report released by Numeris.

== History ==
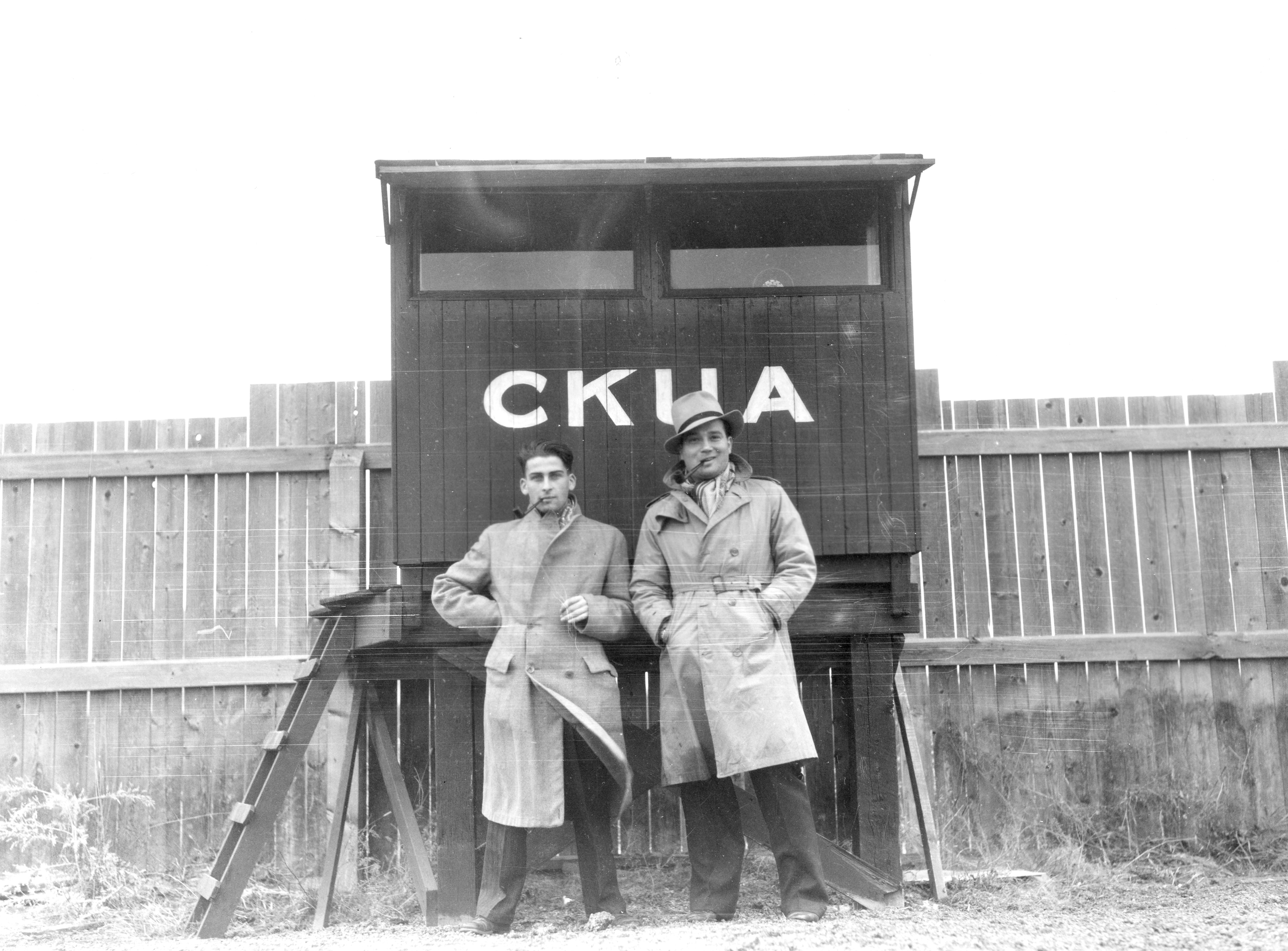
CKUA announcers in 1931. Source: University of Alberta Archives, UAA-1969-010-037

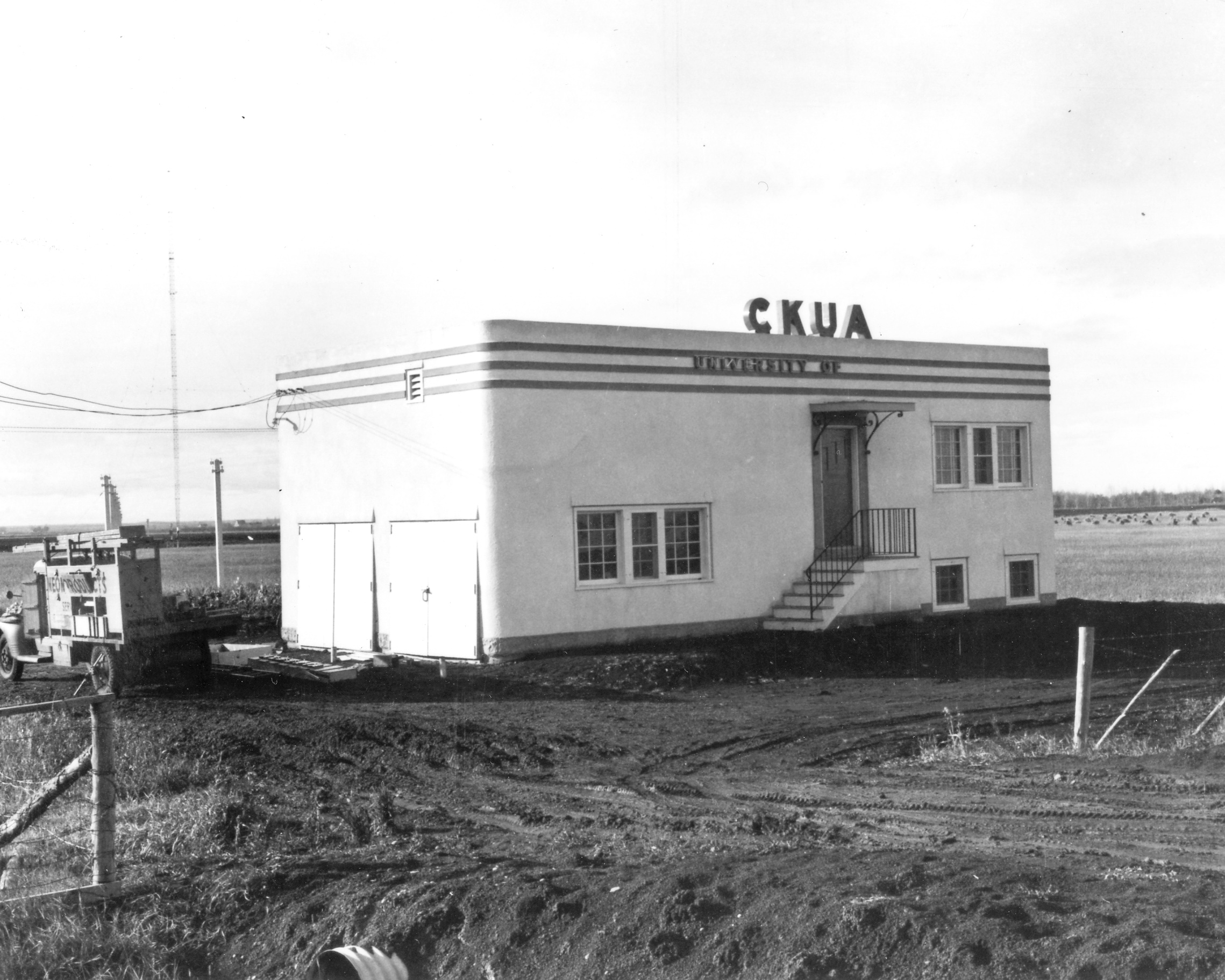
CKUA on Calgary Trail in Edmonton, October 1941. Source: University of Alberta Archives, UAA-1972-058-1755

CKUA was founded on November 21, 1927 through a provincial grant which allowed the University of Alberta's Extension Department to purchase the licence of CFCK, which had been on the air since 1922, sharing a frequency with CJCA. CKUA was also the first radio station to offer educational radio programming, including music concerts, poetry readings, and university lectures. From 1930 to 1931 the station was an affiliate of the CNR Radio network.

From 1945 to 1974 CKUA was operated by Alberta Government Telephones. The crown corporation, Alberta Educational Communications Corporation (later known as Access), assumed ownership of the station in 1974. In 1994, Access sold the CKUA network to the non-profit CKUA Radio Foundation for $10. The same year the station won an Alberta Recording Industry Award of Excellence.

On March 20, 1997, the station went off the air for five weeks due to political squabbles, poor financial management, and attempts at privatization. The station restarted broadcasting on April 25, 1997, after control was given to the public from directors appointed by the provincial government. As of 2005, more than two-thirds of the station's funding came from its listeners in the form of donations.

In April 2024, CKUA announced that it needed to raise $3 million in donations by September 30, 2024, to avoid closure. Despite rising audience numbers and steady revenue, the station cited factors including the recent inflation surge, limited government funding, and the vacancy and devaluation of the Alberta Hotel building, which it owns and rents out, for its financial struggles. In December 2025, the federal government, through PrairiesCan, awarded a $10.9 million grant to CKUA, which will be used to modernize its studio at the Alberta Hotel, expand its performance space, and invest in preservation of its archives.

== Cultural impact ==
The station's practice of supporting local, independent, and non-commercial artists has helped launch the careers of musicians such as k.d. lang, Jann Arden, and Bruce Cockburn. In addition, CKUA has contributed to the careers of Arthur Hiller, Robert Goulet, and Tommy Banks, among others. Throughout the 1930s an early radio drama series, CKUA Players, was produced out of the station and broadcast throughout Western Canada by a network of stations.

== Programming ==
CKUA schedules different programs throughout the week and thus can offer many different genres including blues, bluegrass, R&B, Celtic, country, classical, jazz, reggae, folk, hip hop, dance, funk, rock, roots, and world.

== Historic music archive ==
CKUA's music library boasts one of the largest and most diverse music collections in Canada, with more than 250,000 CDs and LPs, including 10,000 78 rpm records, as well as a few aluminium transcription discs, 45s, and other various media formats.

== Broadcast locations ==
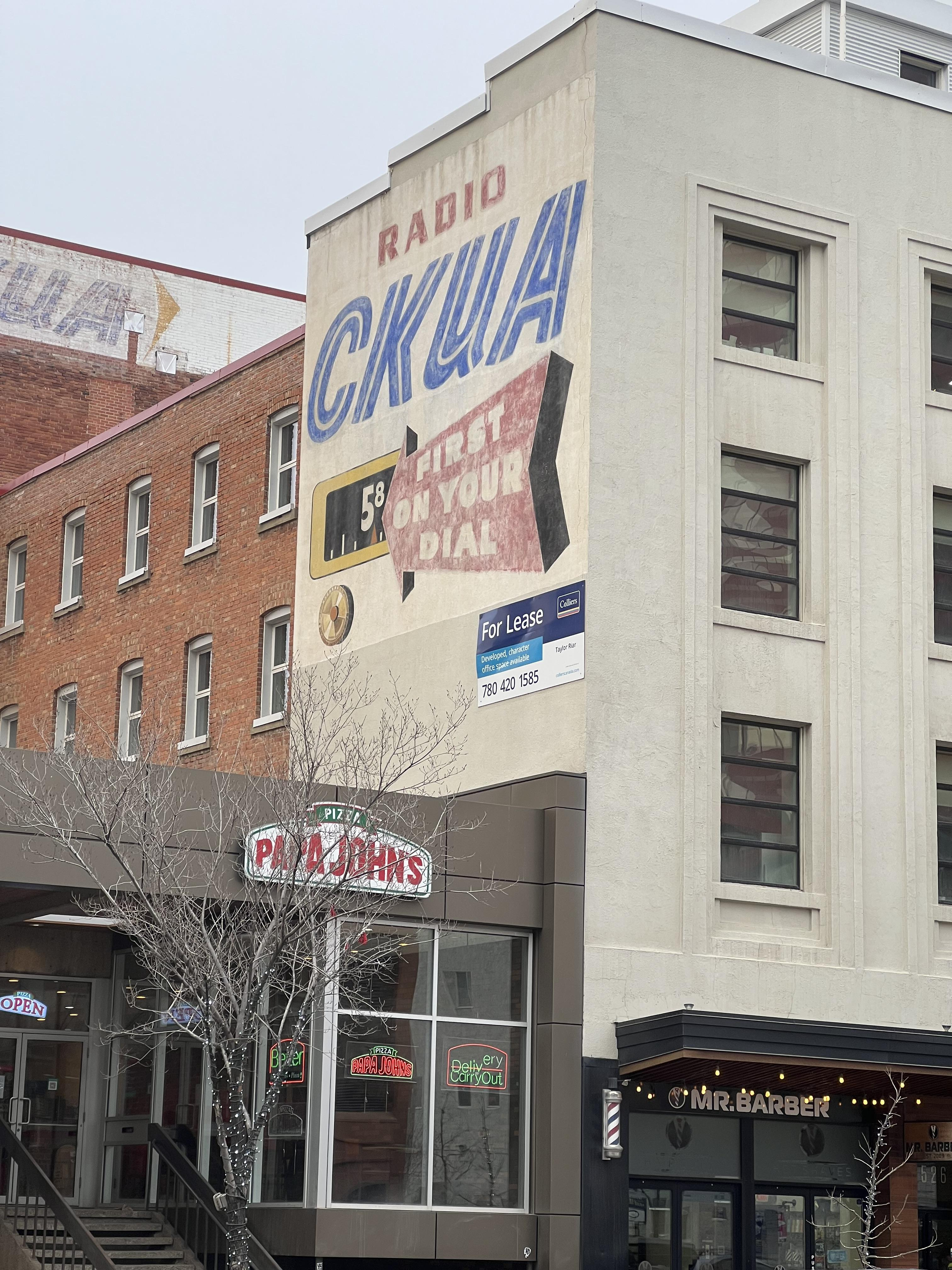
CKUA billboard on its original Alberta Block building headquarters

CKUA was headquartered in the Alberta Block building on Jasper Avenue in Edmonton starting in 1955. In October 2012, CKUA moved into its current location in the Alberta Hotel building, with its first broadcast from the new location on October 15, 2012.

== Broadcasting issues ==
The station's original transmitter was located at 580 kHz in Edmonton. It operated at 10,000 watts. Due to its location near the bottom of the AM dial, as well as its transmitter power, it was powerful enough to cover nearly all of Alberta's densely populated area. It added an FM simulcast on June 28, 1948.

Starting in the 1970s, CKUA built a network of 16 FM repeaters across Alberta. CKUA also broadcasts in western Canada on select cable and satellite providers (such as SaskTel, who carries CKUA across Saskatchewan as a Lloydminster station). As of February 29, 1996, CKUA became the first radio station in Canada to stream their broadcast online, and now has upgraded the service to carry an unlimited number of streams. The station currently has more than 250,000 weekly listeners.

Because of CKUA's extensive coverage, the station was one of only a handful of broadcasters (another being CTV Two Alberta, formerly Access) to carry the Alberta Emergency Public Warning System. The provincial government-funded programme provided the station with 12% of its annual income until the contract was lost to an Ottawa firm, Black Coral Inc., in January 2010.

CKUA announced plans to shut down its legacy 580 AM signal, the longest continuously-used AM frequency in Canada, in the spring of 2013. It would have needed to invest as much as $5 million to upgrade the transmitter site to modern standards, an amount it could not afford. However, CKUA did not receive formal approval from the CRTC until September 12, 2013. AM 580 went off the air on November 21, 2013, the station's 86th anniversary.

== Current on-air personalities ==
The CKUA program lineup relies on a number of on-air personalities.

- Mark Antonelli
- Aaron Au
- Dilbagh Singh Bhangoo ("Baba")
- Allison Brock
- Bob Chelmick
- Priscilla Cherry
- Lark Clark
- Kerry Clarke
- Tom Coxworth
- Leo Cripps
- Tony Dillon-Davis
- David Dodge
- Andy Donnelly
- Dianne Donovan
- Roy Forbes
- Shayne Giles
- Brian Golightly
- Joe Hartfeil
- Cam Hayden
- Kodi Hutchinson
- Tony King
- Terry David Mulligan
- Holger Petersen
- Keri Rak
- Lionel Rault
- Erin Ross
- Orest Soltykevych
- Leeroy Stagger
- Kate Stevens
- Grant Stovel
- Marek Tyler
- Amy van Keeken
- Darcy Whiteside
- Lisa Wilton
- Oskar Zybart
- Spencer Streichert
- Mark Rodgers

== Previous on-air personalities ==
- Chris Allen
- Tommy Banks
- Don Bell
- Don Berner
- Wayne Bezanson
- Celeigh Cardinal
- Dan Cherwoniak
- Garth Collins
- Bill Coull
- Marylou Creechan
- Cheryl Croucher
- Brian Dunsmore
- Ron Durda
- Ken Davis
- Cathy Ennis
- Gil Evans
- Steve Fisher
- Fil Fraser
- Laura Fraser
- Bryan Fustukian
- Robert Goulet
- David Gregory
- Bryan Hall
- Derina Harvey
- Sarah Hoyles
- Jacqueline Janelle
- Herb Johnson
- Ed Kilpatrick
- Craig Korth
- Roger Levesque
- Mairi Maclean
- Chris Martin
- Matt Masters
- Monica Miller
- Richard Moses
- Hayley Muir
- Carol Ann Murray
- David Myles (2018–2022)
- Peter North
- Lee Onisko
- Darrell Podlubny
- Prosper Prodaniuk
- Jan Randall
- Lisa Robinson
- John Rutherford
- John Runge
- Sev Sabourin
- Horst Schmid
- Andrew Smith
- Kelly Thomas
- Crystal Tracey
- Scott Turner
- Jason Valleau
- George Vaitkunas
- Marc Vasey
- David Ward
- Meg Wilcox
- Kevin Wilson
- John Worthington

== Transmitters ==
City of licence	Frequency	Callsign	CRTC Decision
Athabasca	98.3 FM	CKUA-FM-10	
Banff/Canmore	104.3 FM	CKUA-FM-14	86-1098
Calgary	93.7 FM	CKUA-FM-1	
Drumheller/Hanna	91.3 FM	CKUA-FM-13	
Edmonton	94.9 FM	CKUA-FM (flagship)	
Edson	103.7 FM	CKUA-FM-8	
Fort McMurray	96.7 FM	CKUA-FM-11	
Grande Prairie	100.9 FM	CKUA-FM-4	
Hinton	102.5 FM	CKUA-FM-7	
Lethbridge	99.3 FM	CKUA-FM-2	
Lloydminster	97.5 FM	CKUA-FM-15	
Medicine Hat	97.3 FM	CKUA-FM-3	
Peace River	96.9 FM	CKUA-FM-5	
Red Deer	107.7 FM	CKUA-FM-6	2007-25
Spirit River	99.5 FM	CKUA-FM-12	
Whitecourt	107.1 FM	CKUA-FM-9	

== External links and references ==
- CKUA Radio website, with live broadcast streaming
- CKUA History from the Canadian Communications Foundation
- "CFCK" later became "CKUA" - History from the Canadian Communications Foundation
- CKUA: Radio Worth Fighting For, by Marylu Walters; University of Alberta Press
- Broadcast Frequency List
- CKUA: Fifty years of growth for the university's own station by Jean Kirkman
- CKUA in the REC Canadian station database
- CKUA Radio Network discography at Discogs
