= Leonid Skirko =

Canadian opera singer

Leonid Skirko

Leonid Mykolaiovych Skirko (Ukrainian: Леонід Миколайович Скірко; 27 April 1939 – 8 June 2012) was a Canadian bass-baritone opera singer of Ukrainian origin.

== Biography and career ==
He was born in Shcherbynivka near Lozova, Ukraine to Marta (ne Havrysh), and Mykola Skirko. The family fled both German and Russian occupation by crossing Ukraine to the relative safety of German Refugee camps. From 1945 to 1949, the Skirkos waited in a German Displaced persons camp in Augsburg for the opportunity to immigrate to another country. From 1949 to 1955 the family lived in São Paulo, Brazil. Leonid's passion for music was stirred up by attending Orthodox liturgy with his beloved babushka (grandmother) and singing in church choirs from age 9. Leonid was 15 when he arrived in Canada in 1955 with this family.

=== Early period ===
From the age of 17 on, he took singing lessons and coaching from Maestro Hryhorij Shwedchenko, the internationally famous tenor of the Kyiv Opera in Ukraine, and later, from Professor Kazymyr Oleshkevych, a former conductor in the Kyiv Opera. From the years of 1955 to 1969 Leonid took up his high school and university studies and graduated with a bachelor's degree in Electrical Engineering from McMaster University in 1964. In his spare time, he had the rich experience of singing opera with the McMaster Operatic Society under the direction of Lee Heppner and later, the Hamilton Opera.

Leonid won several Kiwanis Music Festival Awards and the W.J. Pickard Limited Scholarship. In 1962 he was invited as a soloist in many concerts in the Hamilton area of Ontario. For the McMaster University Operatic Society, he sang the role of Kezal, the marriage broker, in The Bartered Bride, Lucas in The Student Prince, Escamillo in Carmen, as well that of Mephistopheles in the opera Faust. Earlier he sang in Down in the Valley. In 1965, he performed excerpts from the part of Don Alfonso's role in Così fan tutte. He sang with the Canadian Opera Chorus from 1964 to 1969. Leonid was a member of the Opera Quartet of Hamilton.

With the Hamilton Philharmonic Orchestra and on television, Leonid performed Il maestro di cappella in two concerts. He sang the bass part in Beethoven's Ninth Symphony, and with the Hamilton Opera, played Colline in La bohème, Falstaff in The Merry Wives of Windsor, and Gianni Schicchi in the opera of the same name. The Hamilton Spectator and The Ukrainian Weekly archives chronicle many of Leonid's early performances. In the sixties, Leonid was a soloist in the recording of the Easter Vespers Service with the choir of St. Volodymyr Ukrainian Orthodox Cathedral in Toronto, Ontario.

He appeared with the Toronto Symphony Orchestra singing the roles of Count Ceprano and Brander in concert performances of Verdi's Rigoletto in 1968, and in The Damnation of Faust in 1969. Famous conductor Seiji Ozawa conducted these opera concerts at Massey Hall. Almost a decade later in 1977, Leonid returned to the Toronto Symphony for a concert under the direction of the guest conductor and grand lady of opera Sarah Caldwell, singing excerpts from Rigoletto, in the role of Sparafucile, performed at the Forum in Ontario Place.

=== German period ===
In 1969 Leonid moved to Germany. From 1969 to 1971 he sang ten roles in ten operas in Pfalztheatre in the city of Kaiserslautern, Southwest Germany: Raimundo in Lucia di Lammermoor, Sparafucile in Rigoletto, Bonzo in Butterfly, Der Bauer in Die Kluge, Dr. Grenvil in La traviata, Dr. Fabrizzio in Il Campiello, Rocco in Fidelio, Simon in Gianni Schicchi, Padre Guardiano in La forza del destino, and Il Commendatore in Don Giovanni.

From 1971 until 1973, Leonid was contracted to the Theater Der Stadt Bonn. In Bonn Leonid sang seven roles in six operas. Commendatore in Don Giovanni, Masetto also in "Don Giovanni, Micha in Bartered Bride, Montano in Othello, Reidinger in Mathis der Maler, Alidoro in La Cenerentola(Cinderella), and the 1st Nazarene in Salome. He also recorded Ukrainian songs with the Suedwest Rundfunk Orchestra.

=== Returning to Canada ===
He had a full season as a soloist with the Canadian Opera Company in 1978, and then a prolific period of singing Ukrainian Opera and national song with the Canadian Ukrainian Opera Company and the Dnipro Choir of Edmonton Productions under the tutelage of Volodymyr Kolesnyk.

Leonid returned to Toronto in 1973 and joined the Ivan Romanoff chorus and sang with his group for five years until 1978, singing weekly on CBC radio and in the summer every Sunday at the Ontario Place Forum.

With the Canadian Ukrainian Opera Association he sang performances of the lead role of Ivan Karas in Zaporozhets za Dunayem in 1975. In that same year, he sang in a vocal musical concert for the Ukrainian Art Society "Kozub". In 1976 he performed for the 50th anniversary of St. Vladimir's Cathedral in Toronto. In 1977, he was featured in the Ukrainian Heritage Evening at the Forum in Ontario Place. In 1978 Leonid performed for a full season as a soloist with the Canadian Opera Company. He sang in Tchaikovsky's Joan of Arc, Verdi's Rigoletto, "Strauss's Der Rosenkavalier playing the Cardinal, Count Ceprano, and the police commissioner.

In June 1979, the Canadian Ukrainian Opera Association with Leonid in the role of Kozak Maksim, produced the North American première of the Ukrainian opera Kupalo, under the direction of Volodymyr Kolesnyk. There were many concert tours, including an invitation to Festival Canada on Canada Day, The Show on the Hill, which was telecast nationally by CBC TV from the Parliament Buildings in Ottawa.

=== 1980s ===
In the year 1980, Leonid was the featured artist at the final Ukrainian Festival in Vancouver at the Queen Elizabeth Theatre. Eremenko's cantata Conquerors of the Prairie's, a collaboration of the Dnipro Choir in Edmonton and the Edmonton Symphony Orchestra, called on his talents in 1982. A record Ukraine is Rising which featured Leonid and other soloists was produced by Boris Dunayevsky-Dniprovy. A second one entitled You Are Alive Ukraine! would be produced later by Dnipro Art Production. 1981 marked the premiere of Kupalo in Edmonton. The opera Zaporozhets za Dunayem which had been staged in Toronto and Hamilton was followed by an appearance in Carnegie Hall, also in 1981. This was an opera concert with the American Symphony Orchestra and the Ukrainian Canadian Opera Chorus. There were opera concerts in Ottawa and Montreal. The following article raved about Leonid, and I quote, The two basses were outstanding. Scenes and duets involving the bass Karas are of interest. The most outstanding was the bass Leonid Skirko as Karas. His vocal performance matched his acting.

Kupalo, which in 1979 had been staged in Toronto was now performed in Edmonton in 1981 at the Jubilee Auditorium, and the role of Kozak Maxim once again brought him acclaim. This opera was produced by the Ukrainian Dnipro Ensemble of Edmonton. Also in 1981, there was a symphony concert at Hamilton Place with the McMaster Symphony Orchestra and the Mohawk College Singers featuring Leonid in the coronation scene of Boris Godunov. There were two opera concerts in Ottawa and Montreal. 1982 marked the 50th-anniversary concert of the Ukrainian National Federation in Edmonton, and in 1982 and 1983, duet concerts were performed with Hanna Kolesnyk, in Toronto, Cleveland, and Detroit. In 1983, the character Ivan Karas came to life again in two performances of Zaporozhets za Dunayem at the Jubilee Auditorium in Edmonton. A portrait of Leonid and his co-star Hanna Kolesnyk was commissioned for the production and painted by the Ukrainian artist Ludmila.

1984 marked Ukrainian Opera Week in Toronto which included Natalka Poltavka and Zaporozhets Za Dunayem along with a gala concert which starred Leonid every evening of that week. In 1985 and 1987 there were two concerts of Bortnyansky's Sacred Music, his 35 sacred concertos for the Millennium year of the Baptism of Ukraine, in Toronto's Roy Thomson Hall. In 1986 the female group Merezhi from Edmonton appeared in Toronto with Leonid. There were several millennium concerts. 1988 marked the official opening of the St. Volodymyr Cultural Centre in Oakville. There were concerts of mention in Detroit as well.

The magnificent Sacred Choral Concertos were a cappella concertos written over 25 years from 1780 to 1805. These use a full choir against soloists or small ensembles known as concertinos. Bortnyansky's melodies are saturated with Ukrainian folk tunes, while the texts are taken from the Book of Psalms. The Millennium Choir soloists consisted of 6 sopranos, 3 altos, 4 tenors, 6 basses. There were two concerts to launch the recordings, one in 1985 and one in 1987 in Roy Thomson Hall. The project was conceived by Maestro Kolesnyk, with the support of the Ukraine Millennium Foundation. No less than two hundred singers auditioned from Ontario, Manitoba, Saskatchewan, Alberta, New York, New Jersey, Ohio, Pennsylvania, and Michigan and only 40 were selected. Leonid is featured in 13 of the 35 concertos. The dream or original conception was to travel across the continent and beyond, but sadly, with Kolesnyk's death, this was not to occur.

=== 1990s and 2000s ===
In 1991, Roxolana was performed in Toronto. In 1993, the Dnipro Choir celebrated 40 years of song by commissioning a choral-symphonic work, the oratorio «Sacred Dnipro» by Valeri Kikta and librettist Sophia Maydanska. The world premiere of this oratorio was in Edmonton with Leonid singing the bass part. In 1996, the Canadian Ukrainian Opera Association, together with the Dnipro Choir performed the oratorio «Sacred Dnipro» in Massey Hall in Toronto on April 28, 1996. The live performance of that concert was recorded and the CDs are still available. This oratorio offers a panoramic view of the major epochs in the history of Ukraine, attempting to capture the indomitable spirit of the Ukrainian people. The executive producer of this effort was Toronto's Alla Shklar.

In 2002, Leonid sang the readings from the apostles for the nationally televised funeral of the Ukrainian Canadian Governor General Ray Hnatyshyn. The millennium brought the release of the Sacred Dnipro C.D. in 2006.

He died on 8 June 2012 in Toronto, Ontario, Canada.

== Family ==
Leonid had a sister Nina (married to Andy) and their son Boris (Laura).

Leonid's first marriage was in 1969 to Sonia Skirko and included 3 children, Lesia (married to Scott), Taras (married to Sherry), Oleh, and grandchildren — John, Fallon, Sam, and Lucy.

Leonid remarried in 2006 to Merika Graham Skirko.
