= Amy van Keeken =

Canadian musician

- Born: Amy Rachel van Keeken
- Origin: Vancouver, British Columbia, Canada
- Instruments: Guitar, piano
- Label: Scorpio 76 Records
- Formerly of: The Secretaries; The AwesomeHots; Mysticeti
- Website: Official website

Amy van Keeken is a Canadian musician, as well as a radio DJ for CKUA Radio Network.

== History ==
=== Performing career ===
Amy van Keeken began her performing career initially in acting in Edmonton, Alberta, Canada in the late 1990s. However, beginning in the mid-2000s, van Keeken began to receive recognition for her work as a songwriter and musician. Throughout the 2000s and 2010s, Amy van Keeken performed as a guitarist and vocalist in the Canadian indie rock band the Secretaries. In 2009, van Keeken participated in "That's Edmonton For You," a compilation of musicians from Edmonton including artists such as Cadence Weapon and the Wet Secrets. Van Keeken has also performed with Canadian singer-songwriter Colleen Brown as well as the band the AwesomeHots. In 2017, Capital City Records Podcast described Amy van Keeken as "deep into the Edmonton music scene as a musician, singer, educator and broadcaster on both CJSR and CKUA."

=== Releases ===
In 2014, van Keeken's Live Right received a rating of four out of five stars in the Edmonton Journal. In 2017, van Keeken was nominated for the Edmonton Music Awards in two categories: Female Artist of the Year and Roots/Folk Recording of the Year. Amy van Keeken released her album In Dreams in 2018.

=== Radio broadcasting ===
In 2015, van Keeken began deejaying on CKUA Radio Network.

== Discography ==
Per MusicBrainz.

=== with The Secretaries ===
- The Secretaries (2009)
- Show Me/The Way I Feel (2014)

=== with Mysticeti ===
- Awake/Asleep (2017)

=== Solo ===
- So Long (2013)
- Live Right (2014)
- So Long/Live Right (2015)
- All the Time (2016)
- In Dreams (2018)
- Same Old/Let Me Ease You (2020)

== See also ==
- Music of Alberta
