= Tymofei Koreichuk =

Canadian labor leader

Tymofiy Koreichuk (Ukrainian: Тимофій Корейчук; c. 1879 – October, 1919) was a prominent peasant politician in Galicia and Bukovina (now Ukraine) who became an early Ukrainian Canadian labour leader.

== Early life ==
Koreichuk was born c. 1879 in Kitsman county in Austria-Hungary. In young adulthood, he formed a local branch of the Sich Society, an organization that promoted physical education and national consciousness. He attempted to give the Sich Society movement a more socialist orientation, but was shut down. He formed the Bukovynian section of the Ukrainian Social Democratic Party in 1906. He then traveled through northern Bukovyna, organizing rural labourers and speaking in mass meetings. Under this party, he ran in the Bukovynian Diet in 1911.

== Emigration to Canada ==
Koreichuk emigrated to Canada, apparently, in the spring of 1913. He emigrated because of poverty, Austrian repression, and chronic respiratory illness. He was one of the most experienced labour organizers in North America from Ukraine and quickly became active in the Federation of Ukrainian Social Democrats (FUSD) in Montreal, Quebec. When the FUSD renamed itself the Ukrainian Social Democratic Party of Canada (USDPC) and moved its headquarters to Winnipeg, Manitoba in January 1914, Koreichuk followed. In Winnipeg, he became involved in the local Ukrainian movement, serving as the first presidentof the Volodymyr Vynnychenko Drama Circle and contributing to the Ukrainian newspaper Robochyi narod while speaking at events organized by the USDPC. While working with the USDPC in Western Canada in the spring of 1915, he was interned with other unnaturalized Ukrainian workers in the Crowsnest Pass. Afterwards, he ran a Ukrainian workers' bookstore in Winnipeg due to his worsening health, but in 1917 in Ottawa he spoke at a May Day rally regarding the recent Russian Revolution and in 1918 in Welland he organized a workers' night school. In 1918, he moved to rural Alberta for health reasons and also to avoid intensified repression.

On September 5, 1919, Koreichuck was arrested with making "seditious speeches". This came after he was denounced by the local Ukrainian clergy and businessesman in Vegreville, who feared labour unrest and Bolshevism. Still an unnaturalized Austro-Hungarian subject, he was sent to an internment camp in Vernon, British Columbia. After a few weeks, he died of tuberculosis.

== See also ==
- Ukrainian Canadian internment
