= Ukrainian Dnipro Ensemble of Edmonton =

Ukrainian Dnipro Ensemble of Edmonton logo.

The Ukrainian Dnipro Ensemble of Edmonton is a choir in Edmonton, Alberta, Canada, which specialises in Ukrainian choral music.

The Dnipro Male Chorus was organized in Edmonton in 1953 by Roman Soltykewych, along with a group of devotees, whose primary concern was the fostering, promotion, and perpetuation of the finest elements of Ukrainian choral music. The son of the first conductor of the Dnipro Male Chorus, Orest Soltykevych, was instrumental in creating the Ukrainian Male Chorus of Edmonton.

The current generation of the Ukrainian Dnipro Ensemble of Edmonton continues this work of preserving Ukrainian musical culture within the parameters of the Canadian multicultural identity.
