= Terry Bidiak =

Canadian soccer player

Personal information
- Full name: Taras Bidiak
- Date of birth: 20 June 1945 (age 81)
- Place of birth: Rakovets, Ukrainian SSR, Soviet Union
- Position: Defender

Youth career
- 1951–1959: Toronto Ukraina

College career
| Years | Team | Apps | (Gls) |
| 1964–1966 | Michigan State Spartans | | |

Senior career*
| Years | Team | Apps | (Gls) |
| 1960–1963 | Toronto Ukraina | | |
| 1967–1968 | Detroit Cougars | | |
| 1971 | Toronto Metros | 3 | (0) |
| 1971 | →Toronto Hellas (loan) | | |
- * Club domestic league appearances and goals

Terry Bidiak (born 20 June 1945) is a Canadian former soccer player who played as a midfielder.

== Career ==
Bidiak played at the youth level with Toronto Ukraina, and played with the senior team in 1960 in the National Soccer League. In 1964, he played at the college levelwith Michigan State University. In 1967, he signed a contract with Detroit Cougars of the United Soccer Association. In 1971, he signed with the Toronto Metros of the North American Soccer League. In July, 1971 the Metros loaned Bidiak to the Toronto Hellas of the National Soccer League. He shortly was recalled back to play with the Metros as the club experienced a player shortage due to inquires. He played in three matches for the Toronto Metros.

== International career ==
Bidiak was called up by the Canada men's national soccer team in 1968, but failed to make an appearance for the national team.
