= Vladimir Mackiw =

Canadian inventor, industrialist and chemist of Ukrainian origin

Vladimir Nicolaus Mackiw (August 4, 1923, Stanisławów – 2001, Islington) was a Canadian inventor, industrialist, and chemist of Ukrainian origin who revolutionized the mining industry with his inventions and techniques.

He received an honorary degree from the University of Alberta in 1976, and the Gold Medal of the Institute of Mining and Metallurgy in London, England, in 1977.
