= Ukrainian American Archives and Museum of Detroit =

Museum in Hamtramck, Michigan

Ukrainian American Archives and Museum of Detroit (UAAM)
- Established: 1958
- Location: 9630 Joseph Campau, Hamtramck, Michigan 48212
- Coordinates: 42.3963°N 83.0571°W
- Type: History museum, Cultural center
- Key holdings: Archives, Library
- Collections: Folk art, Fine arts
- Collection size: The Olga Meyer & Sutar-Sutaruk-Meyer Foundation Library: 30,000 books
- Founder: Roman and Ivanka Dacko
- Executive director: Olga Liskiwskyi
- Website: www.ukrainianmuseumdetroit.org

The Ukrainian American Archives and Museum of Detroit (UAAM) was founded by Ukrainian refugees to America after the Second World War. Established in 1958 to hold an expansive collection of folk art, paintings, ceramics, medals, memorabilia, historical documents, photography, and Ukrainian-language books and periodicals, the non-profit 501c3, which is a member of the Ukrainian Heritage Consortium of North America (UHCNA), began as a "basement museum." The small bank building that replaced the basement was replaced by a 13,500 square-foot building near the Hamtramck Historical Museum and the Polish Art Center in 2017.

The museum's original aim was to serve as a research and educational center on Ukrainian immigrants to Michigan and their contributions to the United States by "preserv[ing] Ukrainian cultural and historical artifacts and ... educat[ing] the public ... by maintaining an archive, library, and museum." Since the Russian invasion of Ukraine in 2022, however, it has also become a hub for people seeking information on how to help Ukraine.Also a member of the Ukrainian American Crisis Response (Committee of Michigan), the staff at UAAM are happy to help.

The museum collections include Ukrainian art, crafts, musical instruments, textiles and photographs. The archive holdings relate to Ukrainian immigration and the library contains 30,000 books. Classes are given in Ukrainian folk arts and embroidery, and the museum has hosted "fairly significant exhibits in the past, including ones on ritual cloth, headdresses and decorated Easter eggs. They have also hosted a youth symposium.

Asked to pick out especially interesting parts of the UAAM's collection, a museum representative points to emblems of Ukrainian success and tragedy. The latter category includes oral histories by Holomodor and Auschwitz survivors and original photos from the 1986 Chornobyl nuclear disaster. The former includes the archives of "Dr. Mary Beck, the first female president," and the first Ukrainian-American, "of the Detroit City Council and Detroit's acting mayor from 1958-1962." It also includes a rare document signed by Andrei Sheptysky, Metropolitan Archbishop of the Ukrainian Greek Catholic Church and a candidate for sainthood, as well as the authenticated death mask of Taras Shevchenko — once a serf, then an exile, now Ukraine's most acclaimed poet.

== Holdings ==
- Art by painter Michajlo Dmytrenko, cartoonist Edward Kozak (EKO), and sculptor Ferenc Varga; a cross-section of ceramics and carvings from throughout Ukraine
- Textile art, embroidery, regional costume
- Currency, coins, postage stamps, and historic postcards
- The Olga Meyer & Sutar-Sutaruk-Meyer Foundation Library: More than 30,000 Ukrainian and English-language books from the late 19th century to present
- Pysanka (Easter Egg) collection, including works by Arnie Klein, Vera Manko, Luba Petrusha, and the late Roman Seniuk
- Primary source materials documenting the history of Ukrainian-American organizations, especially in the metropolitan Detroit area

== Cultural preservation ==
In 2026, Nadia Juzych, a UAAM representative, explained the importance of Ukrainian cultural preservation to the Hamramck Review. "As a “captive nation” under the Soviet Union," she said, "it became increasingly important for exiled Ukrainians to preserve and cultivate their identity, as Ukrainian culture and language were brutally suppressed during Soviet rule....The arts were especially targeted."

Detroit News reporter Maureen Feighan spoke to the same themes in a 2022 article on the museum. "Saving cultural items in Ukraine has been a challenge for decades.... During World War II, with their land controlled by Nazi Germany, Ukrainians hid a lot of artwork and embroidery." In the same article, George Hnatiuk, a donor to Cleveland's Ukrainian Museum-Archives, explained that "[H]aving the items at the Ukrainian American Archives & Museum is a safe home, 'a permanent home.' Especially with [the war] in Ukraine — churches are being destroyed, museums are being destroyed, artifacts that may be hundreds or maybe even thousands of years old are being destroyed.... So these will be preserved forever."
