= Orest Semchishen =

Canadian artist (born 1932)

- Born: 1932; Mundare, Alberta
- Known for: photographer

Orest Semchishen (born 1932) is a Canadian photographer whose prints of Alberta document and evoke specific places and people in subjects such as rural communities, ethnic groups and prairie farms and collectively give a sense of Canada. The stark images reveal an economic disparity that scarcely resembles official photographs of the country. He lives in Edmonton.

== Career ==
Semchishen was born in Mundare, Alberta, the grandson of Ukrainian immigrants. In the early 1970s, after he had retired from a career as a radiologist he decided to take extension classes at the University of Alberta and become a photographer. Concerned about the abandonment of rural Byzantine rite churches, he systematically recorded them using a view camera along with disappearing Albertan localities as they were 40 years ago (these black-and-white works date from 1973 to 1986). His major influence is said to be the American photographer Walker Evans but he developed his own style, distinguished by its "restrained lucidity".

== Exhibitions ==
Semchishen has had a number of solo exhibitions from 1976 on, among them one of the Chinese community in 1985, Dragon to Phoenix and one of Trappers in the Whyte Museum of the Canadian Rockies (1989). In 1992, his work was exhibited in Presence of the Prairie at the Edmonton Art Gallery. His many group exhibitions include two at the National Film Board (1975 and 1983) and one at the National Gallery of Canada (1981). In 2006, Through Alberta Eyes – The Photographs of Orest Semchishen was shown at the art gallery at Mount Saint Vincent University, Halifax, NS.

== Selected public collections ==
His work has been collected by public institutions in Canada including Library and Archives Canada which holds the extensive body of his work (c. 1970-1994); the National Gallery of Canada; the Alberta Foundation for the Arts; Art Gallery of Alberta, The Bohdan Medwidsky Ukrainian Folklore Archives, University of Alberta; the Glenbow Museum; Winnipeg Art Gallery; the Provincial Archives of Alberta; and the Remai Modern in Saskatoon, among others.
