= Roman Soltykewych =

Ukrainian-Canadian conductor (1909–1976)

Roman Soltykewych (Ukrainian: Роман Солтикевич; February 4, 1909 – November 17, 1976) was a Ukrainian-Canadian conductor of the Ukrainian Dnipro Ensemble of Edmonton and the father of Orest Soltykevych.

Soltykewych was born in the Austro-Hungarian Empire in the town of Ulucz, located in what is now Poland in the area known as Lemkivshchyna. He went to primary school in Ulucz before travelling to Przemyśl for middle school. Soltykewych continued his studies at the Musical Institute of Mykola Lysenko in Lviv, Ukraine. After the Second World War, Soltykewych travelled through Austria to France before emigrating to Edmonton, Canada. Soltykewych maintained friendships with writers, poets, artists, cultural and public figures, and was well acquainted with Ivan Franko, a famous Ukrainian poet.

== Personal life ==
Roman's father, Orest, was a priest at the Ukrainian Catholic Church in Ulucz, the Church of Ascension of our Lord but also visited other churches in the area including the Church of St. Nicholas, built in 1925 (burned down after WWII). The church is a UNESCO World Heritage Site and is the oldest wooden church in Poland. During his time in Ulucz, Soltykewych organized a patriotic choir for the local branch of the Prosvita ("enlightenment") society at the church to sing and perform for the local area.

In 1955, Soltykewych married Stephania Derech, and had a son, Orest, and two daughters, Nadia and Vera.

Roman's son, Orest Soltykevych, continued working in the world of music as the conductor of the Ukrainian Male Chorus of Edmonton and the Verkhovyna Choir.

== Musical career ==
When Soltykewych first arrived in Edmonton, Alberta, he conducted the church choir at the Ukrainian Catholic St. Josaphat Cathedral.

In 1953, Soltykewych founded the "Dnipro" Choir, now knows as the Ukrainian Dnipro Ensemble of Edmonton, after the famous river in Ukraine, and was originally just a male choir. On November 29 of the same year, Soltykewych led a performance in memory of the late Metropolitan Andrey Sheptytsky.

Soltykewych founded the SUMK Choir (Ukrainian: Хор СУМК, meaning Canadian Ukrainian Youth Association) in 1966 in Edmonton, Alberta. Since its founding, it has performed across Canada and in Italy, Austria, and West Germany. The group also performed in Winnipeg, Manitoba, at the Ukrainian Week Festival to celebrate the 57th anniversary of the independence of Ukraine in January 1975.

In 1965, Soltykewych left the choir at St. Josaphat Cathedral, and began conducting at the St. John's Cathedral Choir in Edmonton, Alberta.

In 1973, Soltykewych was presented with an achievement award by the Premier of Alberta at the time, Peter Lougheed.

After his death, Soltykewych had a scholarship created in his honour, the Roman Soltykewych Music Scholarship, for those looking to pursue further studies in the field of Ukrainian choral or vocal music.

== Death ==
Roman Soltykewych died on November 17, 1976, in Edmonton, Alberta, at the age of 67 after suffering a heart attack.
