= Myroslaw Stechishin =

Ukrainian-Canadian editor and public figure

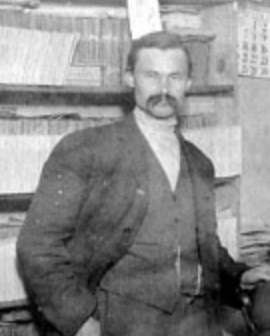
- Stechishin, c. 1909-1912
- Born: July 24, 1883; Hleshchava, Galicia, Austria-Hungary
- Died: November 18, 1947 (aged 64); Winnipeg, Manitoba
- Resting place: All Saints Cemetery, Rivercrest, Manitoba
- Occupations: Editor, activist, public figure

Myroslaw Stechishin (Ukrainian: Мирослав Стечишин, July 24, 1883 – November 18, 1947) was a Ukrainian-Canadian editor, political activist, and public figure. After immigrating from Galicia to Canada in 1902, Stechishin worked as a labourer and was socialist activist. Later, he became greatly involved in the Ukrainian community of Winnipeg, Manitoba.

Stechishin served as editor for newspapers including Robochyi narod (Winnipeg), Novyny (Edmonton), Narodna volia (Scranton), and most notably Ukraïns’kyi holos (Winnipeg). He was part of the establishment of the Ukrainian Social Democratic Party (Canada) in 1910, the Ukrainian Self-Reliance League in 1927, and the Ukrainian Canadian Congress in 1940, among other organizations.

== Early life and immigration ==
Stechishin was born in Hleshchava, Galicia—a village 10 kilometres east of Terebovlia—then part of Austria-Hungary. He is the older brother of Michael and Julian Stechishin, who both would also immigrate to Canada: Michael became an author and district court judge in Saskatchewan, and Julian became an editor, community leader, author, and husband of Savella Stechishin. In Galicia, Stechishin was raised in the Ukrainian Catholic Church and was exposed to the Ukrainian Radical Party and other agrarian left-wing movements.

Stechishin immigrated to Canada in 1902, at 19 years old. He arrived initially in Winnipeg, Manitoba before spending his first summer in Canada as a seasonal worker with the Canadian Pacific Railway in Pilot Butte, Saskatchewan. While there, Stechishin gained the knowledge and inspiration to later write the short story "Pilot Butte," named for the town, which tells the difficult story of a young Ukrainian immigrant named Pavlo who found work as a labourer at the Pilot Butte CPR station.

Having then moved to California in 1903, Stechishin spent time in Caspar and at Agapius Honcharenko's commune near Hayward. In Caspar in 1903, he wrote "Pilot Butte," which was published one year later in Zhuravli in Scranton, Pennsylvania (where he would later live for a few years).

== Socialist activist ==
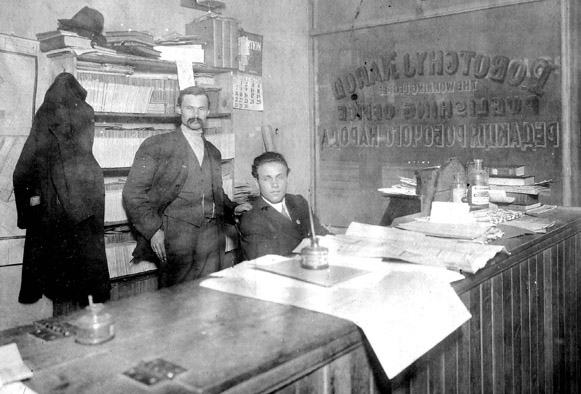
Stechishin (left) and Matthew Popovich in the Robochyi narod office in Winnipeg

Stechishin returned to Canada in 1905, relocating this time to British Columbia. Alongside Pavlo Krat, Toma Tomashevsky, and Wasyl Holowacky, he became a leader of the Ukrainian socialist movement in pre-war Canada. Like the others, Stechishin had been associated with radical and socialist movements in Galicia, including the Ukrainian Radical Party, and was an ethical socialist.

In 1907, Stechishin was part of the organization of the Borotba society in Vancouver, British Columbia. While in British Columbia, Stechishin fostered Ukrainian immigration to the province by writing about it in the Ukrainian press and corresponded interested potential immigrants.

As a socialist activist, he was critical of the church—particularly for the standard of living enjoyed by some of its clergy when compared to the laypeople.

After returning to Winnipeg, Manitoba, Stechishin became the editor of Robochyi narod, a Ukrainian newspaper affiliated with the Socialist Party of Canada in Winnipeg. He held the position from 1909 to 1912 before he quit the organization over alleged financial improprieties. In 1910, the Ukrainian socialist movement split from the Socialist Party of Canada and became the Ukrainian Social Democratic Party (Canada); he edited the party's weekly paper, Chervonyi prapor. As a leading member of this new party, Stechishin was critical of the lack of autonomy given by the Socialist Party of Canada to its Ukrainian faction.

== Ukrainian public figure ==
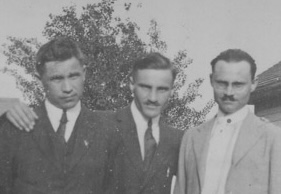
Stechishin brothers (Myroslaw on the right), 1922

From 1913 to 1915, Stechishin edited the new Edmonton, Alberta-based newspaper, Novyny, of the National Association of Alberta.

By 1915, he and others would leave the Ukrainian socialist movement that was becoming more radical and class-oriented (rather than agrarian), instead favouring more moderate Ukrainian groups. While originally critical of the church during his vocally socialist years, Stechishin later abandoned his attitude as he joined the church.

Stechishin then moved for a few years to the United States, where he edited Narodna volia in Scranton, Pennsylvania. In 1920, he was the secretary of a diplomatic mission of the partially-recognized Ukrainian People's Republic to the United States capitol, Washington D.C.

=== Return to Winnipeg ===
From 1921 to 1947, he was the editor of Ukraïns’kyi holos, again in Winnipeg, Manitoba. In the early 1920s, he was active in the ridna shkola Ukrainian schools movement in Manitoba. In 1927 alongside his brothers and a few others, he was a co-founder of the Ukrainian Self-Reliance League and its director until 1935.

During his final decades in Winnipeg, Stechishin was active in the city's Ukrainian community. In 1940, Stechishin was a founding member of the Ukrainian Canadian Congress (then the Ukrainian Canadian Committee), having served on its original executive board. He, again with his brothers, was involved with what became St. Andrew's College, Manitoba, which was founded in 1946, and he also served on the consistory of the Ukrainian Orthodox Church of Canada.

Stechishin died at his home in Winnipeg, Manitoba on November 18, 1947. He was buried at All Saints Cemetery in Rivercrest, Manitoba.

== Works ==
- "Пайлот Бют" [Pilot Butte]. (1904). In Simon Fraser University's digitized records
- "Союз Українців Самостійників у Канаді" [Union of Ukrainian Independents in Canada].
- "Об'єднання українського народу" [Unification of the Ukrainian people]. (1933).
- "Самостійність, соборність, федерація" [Independence, sobrality, federation]. (1942).
- "Радянська Україна в світлі сов'єтської конституції і практики" [Soviet Ukraine in the light of the Soviet constitution and practice]. (1945).
