= Alex Biega (lawyer) =

Canadian lawyer and author

Alexander Biega QC was a Canadian lawyer and author. He was the President of the Ukrainian Canadian Centennial Commission – Quebec, and author of The Ukrainian Experience in Quebec (Toronto, Basilian Press, 1994).

== Background ==
He was the son of Peter Biega, a Ukrainian emigrant who settled in Canada. Biega was called to the Bar of Quebec in 1949 and practiced as a criminal defence lawyer in Montreal, Quebec.

His book, The Ukrainian Experience in Quebec (co-written with Myroslaw Diakowsky), was published by Basilian Press, in both French and English, in 1994.

Biega died in September 2004 at the age of 82.
