= Savella Stechishin =

Ukrainian-Canadian journalist (1903–2002)

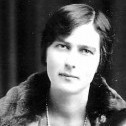
- Savella Stechishin
- Born: Savella Wawryniuk; August 19, 1903; Tudorkovychi
- Died: April 22, 2002 (aged 98)
- Occupations: home economist and writer

Savella Stechishin, CM SOM, née Wawryniuk (August 19, 1903 – April 22, 2002), was a Ukrainian-Canadian home economist and writer, recipient of the Order of Canada. She has been described as "an ethnocultural social maternal feminist" (Ostryzniuk, 1999).

== Biography ==
Stechishin was born in Tudorkovychi, Austrian Galicia (today in Lviv Oblast, Ukraine), and her family emigrated to Canada when she was nine in 1913, settling in Krydor, Saskatchewan. The Ukrainian diaspora is a large one, and her family formed part of a wave that became one of Canada's largest ethnic communities.

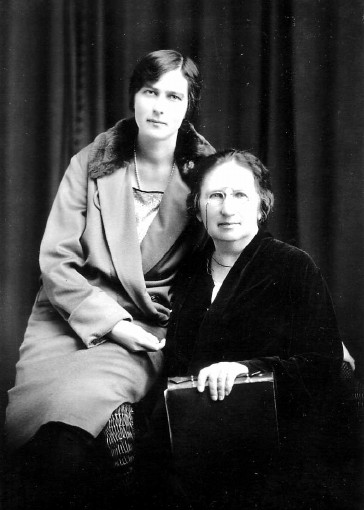
Savella Stechishin and Olena Kysilevska

At age 17 she married Julian Stechyshyn, rector of the St. Petro Mohyla Institute student residence in Saskatoon and brother of Myroslaw Stechishin, and later bore three children, Anatole, Myron, and Zenia. She completed high school and teachers' college, and obtained a Bachelor of Arts degree specializing in home economics from the University of Saskatchewan in 1930, the first Ukrainian woman to receive a degree there.

While studying, she was also the Dean of Women at the St Petro Mohyla Institute, where she organized evening courses in cooking and homemaking, and the culture and cuisine of her homeland, and public speaking for young women. Later, she taught in public schools and lectured in Ukrainian language and in the Department of Women's Services at the University of Saskatchewan, as well as running outreach programs for Ukrainian immigrants. She also lectured around North America and in Western Ukraine (Polish Galicia) before it was annexed by the Soviet Union in 1939.

She helped establish the Ukrainian Women's Association of Canada in 1926, and the Ukrainian Museum of Canada in 1936.

For over 25 years, she was editor of the women's page and columnist for the Winnipeg-based Ukrainian Voice weekly (Ukrayins’kyy Holos). She also contributed to other Ukrainian women's publications in North America and Western Ukraine, and wrote for the Canadian Consumer Information Service during the Second World War.

Shechishin's most prominent book is the English-language Traditional Ukrainian Cookery (1957), which saw its eighteenth reprinting in 1995 and has sold 80,000 copies. Her other books are in Ukrainian: Art Treasures of Ukrainian Embroidery (1950), and a 50th anniversary book for the Saskatoon branch of the Ukrainian Women's Association (1975). She assisted her husband, Julian Stechishin, with a Ukrainian Grammar (1951), and completed his History of Ukrainian Settlement in Canada (1971) after his death—an English translation was published in 1992.

== Awards ==
Savella Stechishin was awarded many honours. Most notably, she was appointed to the Order of Canada on April 20, 1989, and the Saskatchewan Order of Merit in 1998.

== Works ==
- Stechishin, Savella (1950). Art Treasures of Ukrainian Embroidery (Mystets’ki skarby ukraïns’kykh vyshyvok). Winnipeg: Ukrainian Women's Association of Canada.
- Stechishin, Savella ([1957] 1995). Traditional Ukrainian Cookery, 18th ed., Winnipeg: Trident Press. ISBN 0-919490-36-0.
- Stechishin, Savella (1975). Fifty years of the Olha Kobylianska Branch of the Ukrainian Women's Association of Canada, Saskatoon, Saskatchewan: 1923–1973 (Pivstorichchia, 1923–1973, Zhinochoho tovarystva imeny Olh’hy Kobylians’koï v Saskatuni, Saskachevan, pershoho viddilu soiuzu ukraïnok Kanady). Saskatoon: Ukrainian Women's Association, Olha Kobylianska Branch.
