= TJ Sakaluk =

Canadian ice hockey player

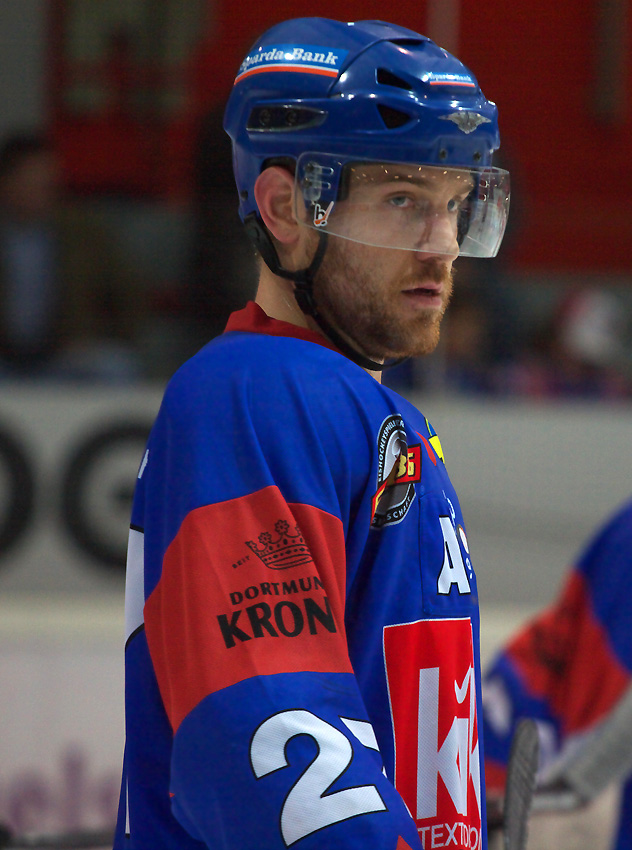
TJ Sakaluk with EHC Dortmund in 2009.

TJ Sakaluk (born April 27, 1983) is a retired Canadian professional ice hockey player who last played with EHC Dortmund in the German Oberliga.

== Early career ==
Born in Hamilton, Ontario, Sakaluk played one season in the Ontario Provincial Junior 'A' Hockey League (OPJHL) split between the Oakville Blades and Bramalea Blues, followed by two seasons with the Port Colborne Sailors of the Golden Horseshoe Junior 'B' League. Following junior, he went on to play two seasons at NCAA Division III SUNY-Potsdam.

== Professional career ==
Sakaluk played professionally from 2006-2010 in the UHL, ECHL, CHL, Norway, Germany and the Netherlands.
