= Ukrainian Museum of Canada =

Canadian Ukrainian museum association

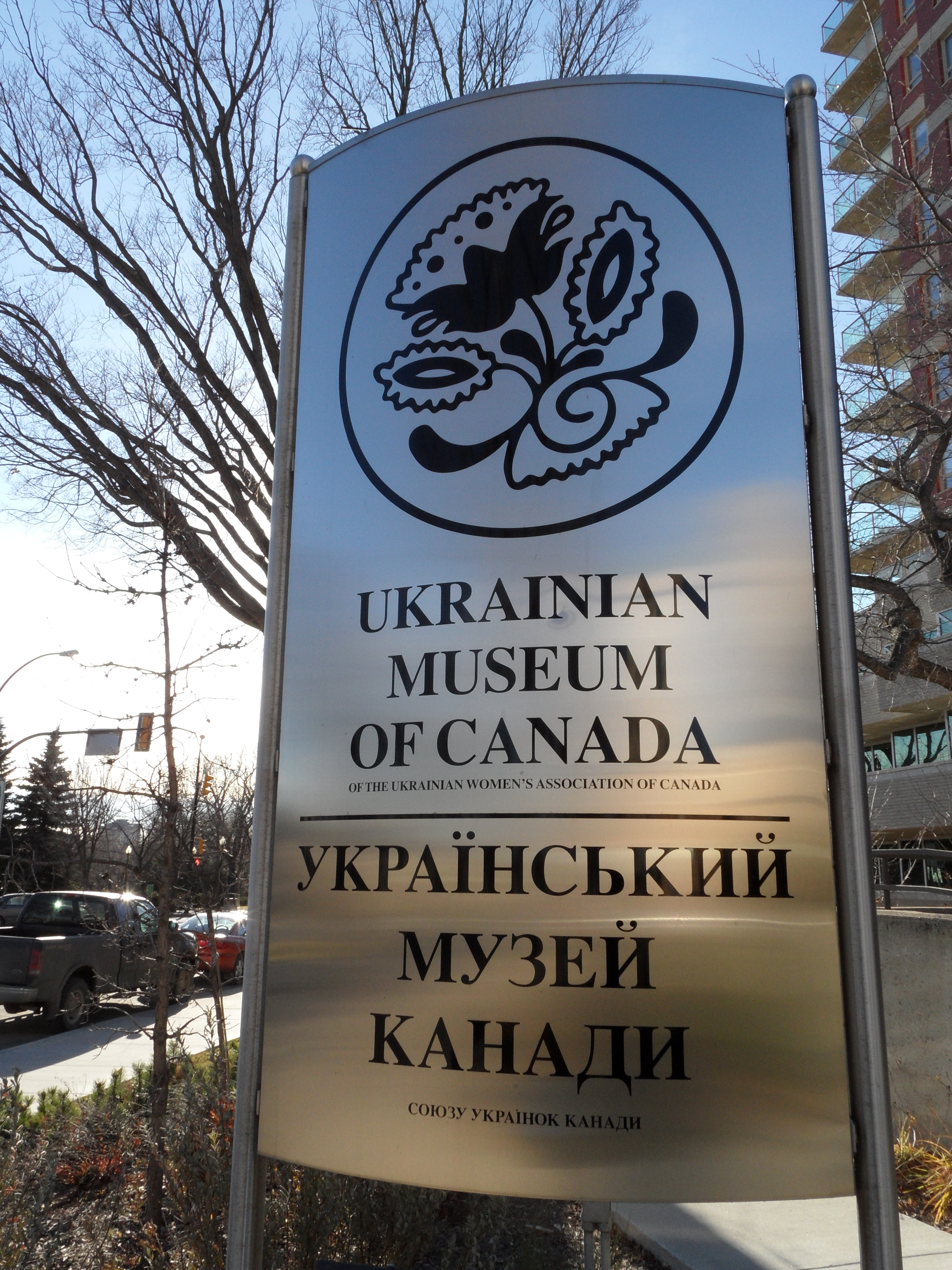
Ukrainian Museum of Canada, Saskatoon

The Ukrainian Museum of Canada (Ukrainian: Український музей Канади, romanized: Ukrajins'kyj muzej Kanady) is a network of museums across Canada that promote Ukrainian cultural life, with a particular focus on experiences of the Canadian Ukrainian diaspora.

== Background ==
The Ukrainian Museum of Canada is a network of museums across Canada that promote Ukrainian cultural life. The headquarters of the network is in Saskatoon, where the first museum was established in 1941 by the Ukrainian Women's Association of Canada. One of the co-founders was the activist and writer Savella Stechishin. Originally, it was housed in the Mohyla Ukrainian Institute, before moving to its own building in 1980.

The Edmonton branch was the next to be established, in 1944.

== Locations ==
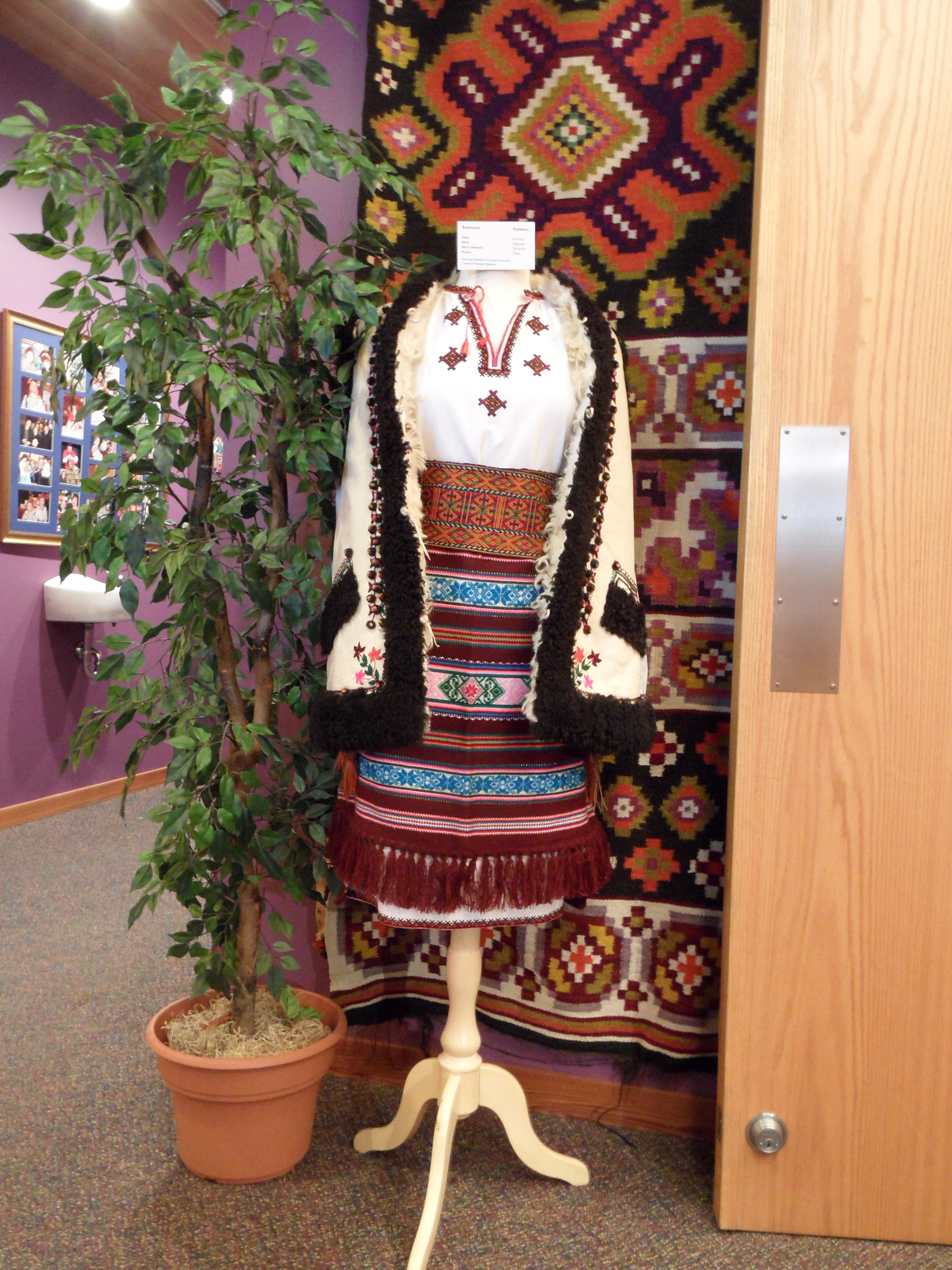
Traditional dress at Ukrainian museum of Canada, branch unspecified

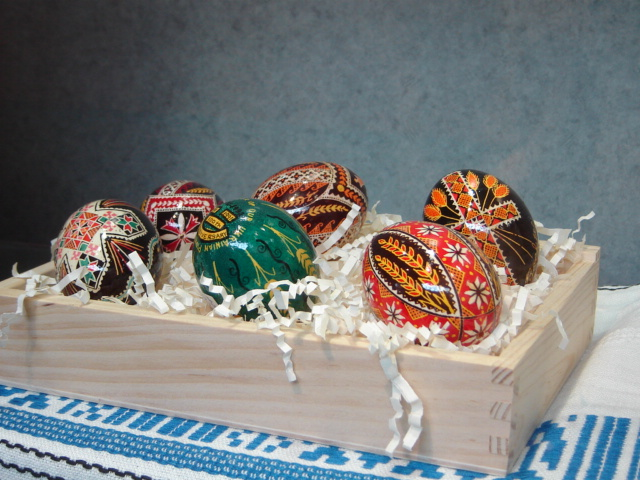
Pysanka eggs on display at the John G. Diefenbaker International Airport

The museum network has branches in Saskatoon, Winnipeg, Toronto, Edmonton, Calgary and Vancouver. The museums have collections that specialize in folk art, textiles and social history objects relating to the experiences of Ukrainian Canadians. In 2020, the Toronto branch jointly curated an exhibition on beadwork with the Native Canadian Centre of Toronto.

In 2022, in response to the Russian invasion of Ukraine, the museums noted increased numbers of visitors and interest in their collections.

== List of museums ==
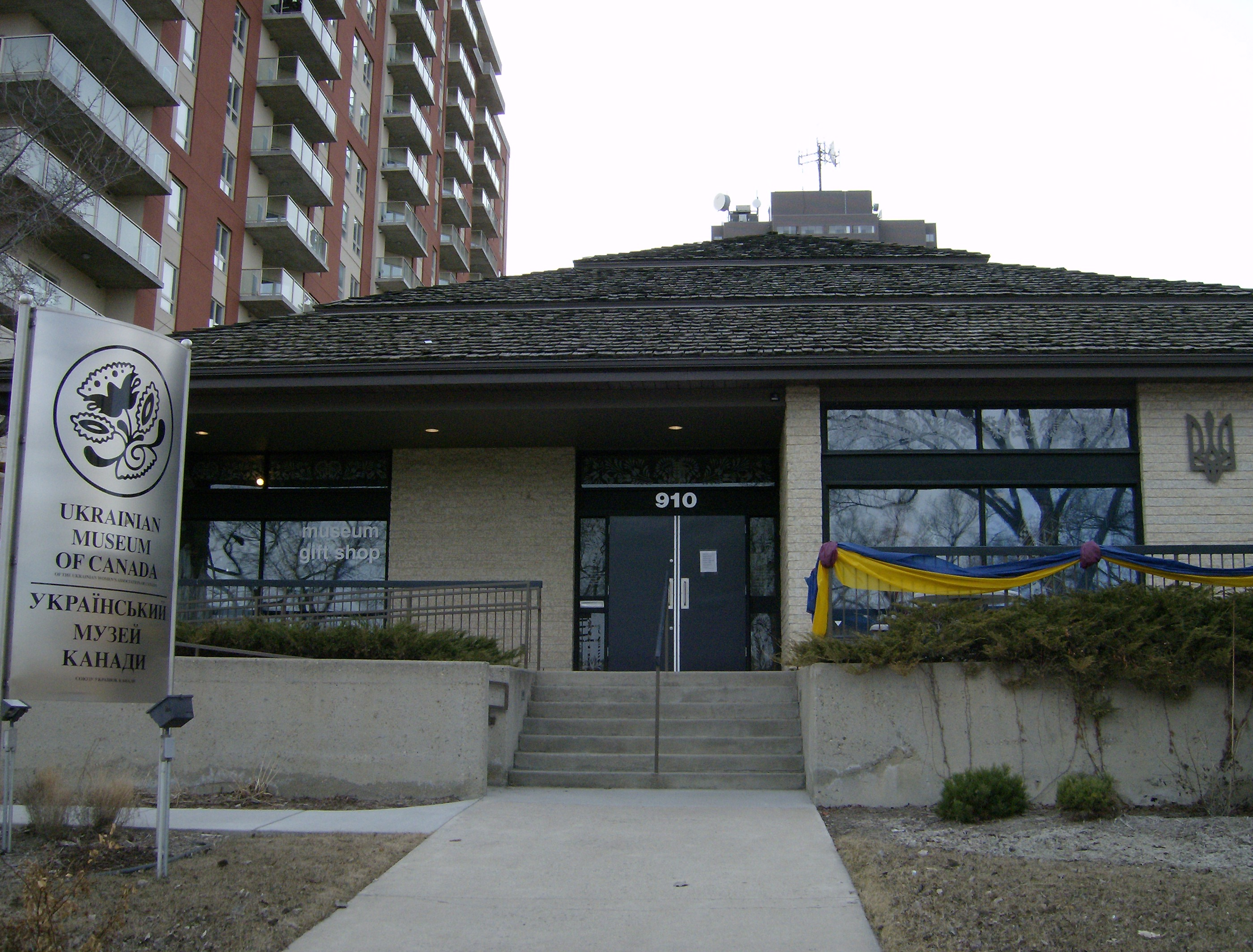
Ukrainian Museum of Canada, Saskatoon

- Ukrainian Museum of Canada, Alberta Branch
- Ukrainian Museum of Canada, Calgary Collection
- Ukrainian Museum of Canada, Manitoba Branch
- Ukrainian Museum of Canada, Ontario Branch
- Ukrainian Museum of Canada, Saskatoon
