= Ukrainian Social Democratic Party (Canada) =

Short-lived Canadian political party

The Ukrainian Social Democratic Party (USDP), originally called the Federation of Ukrainian Social Democrats (FUSD), was a Ukrainian Canadian socialist political party that existed from 1910 to 1918.

== Origins ==
In the first decade of the twentieth century, many recent Ukrainian immigrants to Canada who were on the left wing of the political spectrum joined the Socialist Party of Canada (SPC). Ukrainian branches of the SPC were founded in Winnipeg, Portage la Prairie, and Nanaimo in 1907, and four more followed in early 1908. There was also an unsuccessful attempt to launch a Ukrainian Socialist Alliance within the SPC during the same period. Relations with the SPC's predominantly anglophone leadership were sometimes difficult, and on some occasions Ukrainian party members accused their English comrades of chauvinism. The SPC leadership was, for its part, reluctant to sanction official networks for cultural communities in the party.

In November 1909, several Ukrainian members of the SPC convened a special Socialist Convention of Canadian Ukrainians in Winnipeg. Delegates advocated for a new organization that would facilitate effective communication among Ukrainian branches of the SPC, while also threatening to withdraw from the party if the Ukrainian community's requests for autonomy were not recognized. The FUSD was formally constituted shortly thereafter and held its first convention in Edmonton in August 1910. At this meeting, the party formally severed its ties to the SPC and aligned itself with the newly formed Social Democratic Party of Canada (SDPC).

The FUSD fielded one candidate in the 1911 Canadian federal election: Wasil Holowacky in the Manitoba division of Selkirk. He appeared on the ballot as an independent and received 234 votes for a third-place finish.

The FUSD changed its name to the USDP in early 1914.

== World War I and aftermath ==
The USDP was strongly opposed to participation in World War I, which it identified as an imperialist conflict. At a special conference in April 1915, the party passed a resolution that censured "all socialists who support the war in principle" and called for "the world proletariat to establish a Third Revolutionary International on the ruins of the Second International. Several party members were subsequently arrested and placed in internment camps by the Canadian government.

The USDP strongly supported the February Revolution in Russia and some of its members welcomed the subsequent Bolshevik Revolution.

The Canadian government arrested several of the USDP's leaders in 1918, and it banned the party outright on September 25 of the same year. At the time of its prohibition, the USDP had more than two thousand members across Canada. Several members of the party's left wing later joined the Communist Party of Canada after the CPC's formation in 1921.
