= Andy Otto =

American ice hockey player

- Born: May 8, 1963 (age 63) Park Ridge, Illinois, USA
- Height: 5 ft 10 in (178 cm)
- Weight: 178 lb (81 kg; 12 st 10 lb)
- Position: Defenseman
- Shot: Right
- Played for: Clarkson; New Haven Nighthawks; Rotterdam Panda's; HC Auronzo; Zoetermeer Panters II; The Outlaws Zoetermeer; Hijs Hokij Den Haag III; C.M. Amsterdam
- NHL draft: 225th, 1982; New York Rangers
- Playing career: 1982–2020

Andrew Otto is an American retired ice hockey defenseman who was an All-American for Clarkson.

== Career ==
Otto began attending Clarkson University after being selected by the New York Rangers in the NHL Draft. During his freshman season, he was selected to participate at the 1983 World Junior Ice Hockey Championships. In his time with Clarkson, Otto was a decent player, helping the team make the NCAA Tournament as a sophomore and nearly overcame a 4-goal deficit against Minnesota–Duluth in the quarterfinals.

Otto was named team captain in his senior season and led all defensemen in scoring. He was named an All-American and, while the team's regular season wasn't much different than years past, Clarkson defeated top-seeded Harvard to make their first championship game in fifteen years. the Knights ultimately lost the match and did not receive an at-large bid to the national tournament. Otto finished out the year with a single game for the New Haven Nighthawks.

Rather than stay in North America, Otto travelled to the Netherlands to continue his hockey career. He joined the newly formed Rotterdam Panda's and helped the team win the Eredivisie championship in 1987. He played for HC Auronzo in the Italian second league the following season before returning to the Panda's and helping the club win two more championships in 1989 and 1990. Otto remained with the team for three more years before the closure of their home rink put the club in dire financial circumstances.

Otto returned as a player eleven years later in the Eerste Divisie, the semi-professional second Dutch league. part way through the next season he was sent down to the Tweede Divisie (Dutch third league) and continued to play at the level until the COVID-19 pandemic caused the league to suspended operations in 2020.

== Statistics ==
=== Regular season and playoffs ===
			Regular Season					Playoffs
Season	Team	League	GP	G	A	Pts	PIM	GP	G	A	Pts	PIM
1981–82	Northwood School	NY-HS	—	—	—	—	—	—	—	—	—	—
1982–83	Clarkson	ECAC Hockey	29	5	10	15	24	—	—	—	—	—
1983–84	Clarkson	ECAC Hockey	34	8	19	27	16	—	—	—	—	—
1984–85	Clarkson	ECAC Hockey	33	5	10	15	44	—	—	—	—	—
1985–86	Clarkson	ECAC Hockey	32	4	28	32	24	—	—	—	—	—
1985–86	New Haven Nighthawks	AHL	1	0	0	0	0	—	—	—	—	—
1986–87	Rotterdam Panda's	Eredivisie	—	—	—	—	—	—	—	—	—	—
1987–88	HC Auronzo	Italy 2	17	14	33	47	12	—	—	—	—	—
1988–89	Turbana Panda's Rotterdam	Eredivisie	45	22	39	61	42	—	—	—	—	—
1989–90	Gunco Panda's Rotterdam	Eredivisie	43	12	33	45	62	—	—	—	—	—
1990–91	Gunco Panda's Rotterdam	Eredivisie	24	9	26	35	28	10	2	3	5	2
1991–92	Gunco Panda's Rotterdam	Eredivisie	29	7	23	30	28	3	0	0	0	6
1992–93	Gunco Panda's Rotterdam	Eredivisie	22	8	16	24	12	2	0	0	0	0
2004–05	Zoetermeer Panters II	Eerste Divisie	14	3	8	11	2	3	1	2	3	4
2005–06	Zoetermeer Panters II	Eerste Divisie	3	0	0	0	0	—	—	—	—	—
2005–06	The Outlaws Zoetermeer	Tweede Divisie	2	3	2	5	2	—	—	—	—	—
2006–07	Hijs Hokij Den Haag III	Tweede Divisie	11	9	8	17	0	2	1	5	6	0
2007–08	Hijs Hokij Den Haag III	Tweede Divisie	14	1	17	18	16	1	1	1	2	0
2008–09	Hijs Hokij Den Haag III	Tweede Divisie	14	4	21	25	4	2	0	1	1	2
2009–10	Hijs Hokij Den Haag III	Tweede Divisie	8	4	4	8	6	—	—	—	—	—
2010–11	C. M. Amsterdam	Tweede Divisie	4	1	0	1	2	1	1	1	2	0
2012–13	C. M. Amsterdam	Tweede Divisie	7	3	5	8	2	—	—	—	—	—
2013–14	C. M. Amsterdam	Tweede Divisie	8	2	3	5	0	—	—	—	—	—
2015–16	C. M. Amsterdam	Tweede Divisie	9	4	9	13	6	2	1	4	5	6
2016–17	C. M. Amsterdam	Tweede Divisie	11	2	7	9	16	1	0	0	0	14
2017–18	Hijs Hokij Den Haag III	Tweede Divisie	8	4	8	12	16	—	—	—	—	—
2018–19	Hijs Hokij Den Haag III	Tweede Divisie	9	0	10	10	2	—	—	—	—	—
2019–20	Hijs Hokij Den Haag III	Tweede Divisie	10	3	8	11	6	—	—	—	—	—
NCAA totals			128	22	67	89	108	—	—	—	—	—
Tweede Divisie totals			115	40	102	142	78	9	4	12	16	22

=== International ===
Year	Team	Event	Result	GP	G	A	Pts	PIM
1983	United States	WJC	5th	7	3	1	4	20

== Awards and honors ==
Award	Year
AHCA East Second-Team All-American	1985–86
