= Jaroslav Ševčík =

- Born: May 15, 1965 (age 59); Brno, Czechoslovakia
- Height: 5 ft 10 in (178 cm)
- Weight: 176 lb (80 kg; 12 st 8 lb)
- Position: Right wing
- Shot: Right
- Played for: TJ Zetor Brno; HK Dukla Trenčín; Quebec Nordiques; Rotterdam Panda's; Nottingham Panthers; Nijmegen Tigers; EC VSV; Ratinger Löwen; EC KAC; Kapfenberger SV; Amsterdam Tigers; Graz 99ers
- NHL draft: 177th overall, 1987; Quebec Nordiques
- Playing career: 1982–2001

Jaroslav Ševčík (born May 15, 1965) is a Czech retired professional ice hockey player who played 13 games in the National Hockey League with the Quebec Nordiques during the 1989–90 season. The rest of his career, which lasted from 1982 to 2001, was mainly spent in the European leagues.

== Career statistics ==
=== Regular season and playoffs ===
			Regular season					Playoffs
Season	Team	League	GP	G	A	Pts	PIM	GP	G	A	Pts	PIM
1982–83	TJ Brno	CSSR	3	0	0	0	0	—	—	—	—	—
1983–84	TJ Brno	CSSR	32	2	4	6	24	—	—	—	—	—
1984–85	HK Dukla Trencin	CSSR	31	3	3	6	6	—	—	—	—	—
1985–86	HK Dukla Trencin	CSSR	22	0	1	1	14	—	—	—	—	—
1986–87	TJ Brno	CSSr	41	14	9	23	14	—	—	—	—	—
1987–88	Fredericton Express	AHL	32	9	7	16	8	—	—	—	—	—
1988–89	Halifax Citadels	AHL	78	17	41	58	17	4	1	1	2	2
1989–90	Quebec Nordiques	NHL	13	0	2	2	2	—	—	—	—	—
1989–90	Halifax Citadels	AHL	50	17	17	34	38	3	0	1	1	0
1990–91	Halifax Citadels	AHL	66	16	26	42	22	—	—	—	—	—
1991–92	SC Rapperswil-Jona	NLB	10	5	3	8	14	—	—	—	—	—
1991–92	Rotterdam Panda's	NED	12	12	6	18	24	3	1	1	2	6
1992–93	Nottingham Panthers	BHL	7	9	9	18	0	—	—	—	—	—
1992–93	Rotterdam Panda's	NED	18	10	15	25	26	9	5	7	12	0
1993–94	Nijmegen Devils	NED	17	9	17	26	6	12	5	8	13	20
1994–95	Villacher SV	AUT	40	21	52	73	—	—	—	—	—	—
1995–96	EC Ratingen	DEL	17	3	10	13	8	—	—	—	—	—
1995–96	EC KAC	AUT	26	11	24	35	12	—	—	—	—	—
1996–97	EC Kapfenberg	AUT	41	13	16	29	45	—	—	—	—	—
1997–98	EC Kapfenberg	AUT	28	5	14	19	12	—	—	—	—	—
1998–99	ESV Bayreuth	GER-3	44	22	24	46	18	—	—	—	—	—
1999–00	Amsterdam Tigers	NEd	16	6	9	15	26	11	3	8	11	8
2000–01	Graz 99ers	AUT	39	23	25	48	16	—	—	—	—	—
AUT totals			174	73	131	204	85	—	—	—	—	—
CSSR totals			129	19	17	36	58	—	—	—	—	—
NHL totals			13	0	2	2	2	—	—	—	—	—

=== International ===
Year	Team	Event	GP	G	A	Pts	PIM
1983	Czechoslovakia	EJC	5	1	2	3	0
1985	Czechoslovkia	WJC	7	1	0	1	2
Junior totals			12	2	2	4	2
