= Roger Kortko =

Canadian ice hockey player

- Born: February 1, 1962 (age 63); Rosthern, Saskatchewan, Canada
- Height: 5 ft 11 in (180 cm)
- Weight: 180 lb (82 kg; 12 st 12 lb)
- Position: Centre
- Shot: Right
- Played for: New York Islanders
- NHL draft: 126th overall, 1982; New York Islanders
- Playing career: 1983–1992

Roger Kortko (born February 1, 1963) is a Canadian former professional ice hockey player who played 79 games in the National Hockey League. He played with the New York Islanders.

== Career statistics ==
			Regular season					Playoffs
Season	Team	League	GP	G	A	Pts	PIM	GP	G	A	Pts	PIM
1980–81	Humboldt Broncos	SJHL	60	43	82	125	52	—	—	—	—	—
1980–81	Saskatoon Blades	WHL	2	0	1	1	2	—	—	—	—	—
1981–82	Saskatoon Blades	WHL	65	33	51	84	82	4	1	4	5	7
1982–83	Saskatoon Blades	WHL	72	62	99	161	79	1	1	1	2	5
1983–84	Indianapolis Checkers	CHL	64	16	27	43	48	9	1	5	6	9
1984–85	Springfield Indians	AHL	30	8	30	38	6	—	—	—	—	—
1984–85	New York Islanders	NHL	27	2	9	11	9	10	0	3	3	17
1985–86	Springfield Indians	AHL	12	2	10	12	10	—	—	—	—	—
1985–86	New York Islanders	NHL	52	5	8	13	19	—	—	—	—	—
1986–87	Springfield Indians	AHL	75	16	30	46	54	—	—	—	—	—
1987–88	Binghamton Whalers	AHL	72	26	45	71	46	4	1	1	2	2
1988–89	Binghamton Whalers	AHL	72	22	36	58	28	—	—	—	—	—
1989–90	EV Füssen	GER-2	36	18	53	71	31	12	19	30	49	6
1990–91	Tilburg Trappers	NED	21	27	22	49	22	17	9	22	31	8
1991–92	Tilburg Trappers	NED	34	25	51	76	12	—	—	—	—	—
1993–94	Leroy Braves	LLHL	—	27	30	57	—	—	—	—	—	—
AHL totals			268	74	151	225	144	4	1	1	2	2
NHL totals			79	7	17	24	28	10	0	3	3	17
