= Rick Boh =

Canadian ice hockey player

- Born: May 18, 1964 (age 61); Kamloops, British Columbia, Canada
- Height: 5 ft 10 in (178 cm)
- Weight: 182 lb (83 kg; 13 st 0 lb)
- Position: Centre
- Shot: Right
- Played for: Minnesota North Stars
- NHL draft: 1987 NHL Supplemental Draft; Minnesota North Stars
- Playing career: 1987–1993

John Richard Boh (born May 18, 1964) is a Canadian former professional ice hockey centre. He played eight games in the National Hockey League (NHL) with the Minnesota North Stars during the 1987–88 season, scoring two goals and one assist. The rest of his career, which lasted from 1987 to 1993, was mainly spent in Europe.

== Career statistics ==
=== Regular season and playoffs ===
			Regular season					Playoffs
Season	Team	League	GP	G	A	Pts	PIM	GP	G	A	Pts	PIM
1981–82	Penticton Knights	BCJHL	—	—	—	—	—	—	—	—	—	—
1982–83	Penticton Knights	BCJHL	41	18	49	67	139	—	—	—	—	—
1983–84	Colorado College	WCHA	27	1	5	6	12	—	—	—	—	—
1984–85	Colorado College	WCHA	38	10	18	28	24	—	—	—	—	—
1985–86	Colorado College	WCHA	40	30	29	59	14	—	—	—	—	—
1986–87	Colorado College	WCHA	38	22	42	64	37	—	—	—	—	—
1986–87	Canadian National Team	Intl	10	3	3	6	0	—	—	—	—	—
1987–88	Minnesota North Stars	NHL	8	2	1	3	4	—	—	—	—	—
1987–88	Kalamazoo Wings	IHL	75	26	41	67	45	7	2	1	3	5
1988–89	HC Fiemme Cavalese	ITA	31	29	37	66	34	—	—	—	—	—
1990–91	Interacai	NED	22	19	31	50	12	10	12	12	24	4
1991–92	Meetpoint Eaters Geleen	NED	30	30	43	73	16	8	7	6	13	12
1992–93	Meetpoint Eaters Geleen	NED	13	11	13	24	10	17	16	17	33	12
NED totals			65	60	87	147	38	35	35	35	70	28
NHL totals			8	2	1	3	4	—	—	—	—	—

== Awards and honors ==
Award	Year
All-WCHA Second Team	1986–87
