= Bob Sullivan (ice hockey) =

Canadian ice hockey player (1957–2018)

- Born: November 29, 1957; Noranda, Quebec, Canada
- Died: May 24, 2018 (aged 60); Mannheim, Germany
- Height: 6 ft 0 in (183 cm)
- Weight: 225 lb (102 kg; 16 st 1 lb)
- Position: Left wing
- Shot: Left
- Played for: NHL; Hartford Whalers; AHL; Binghamton Whalers; IHL; Toledo Goaldiggers; New Haven Nighthawks
- NHL draft: 116th overall, 1977; New York Rangers; 180th overall, 1978; Atlanta Flames
- Playing career: 1977–1989

Robert James Sullivan (November 29, 1957 – May 24, 2018) was a Canadian professional ice hockey winger who played 62 games in the National Hockey League for the Hartford Whalers. Prior to joining the NHL, Sullivan played in the American Hockey League and International Hockey League, winning the Dudley "Red" Garrett Memorial Award as the rookie of the year in the American Hockey League in 1981–82.

== Career statistics ==
=== Regular season and playoffs ===
			Regular season					Playoffs
Season	Team	League	GP	G	A	Pts	PIM	GP	G	A	Pts	PIM
1974–75	Saint-Jerome Alouettes	QJAHL	54	29	47	76	31	—	—	—	—	—
1974–75	Montreal Bleu Blanc Rouge	QMJHL	2	1	1	2	0	—	—	—	—	—
1975–76	Montreal Juniors	QMJHL	37	6	6	12	15	—	—	—	—	—
1975–76	Chicoutimi Sagueneens	QMJHL	31	14	16	30	17	5	4	2	6	0
1976–77	Chicoutimi Sagueneens	QMJHL	71	45	65	110	80	8	3	7	10	13
1977–78	Toledo Goaldiggers	IHL	65	27	27	54	60	17	3	9	12	16
1977–78	New Haven Nighthawks	AHL	2	0	0	0	0	—	—	—	—	—
1977–78	Dalhousie University	CIAU	5	5	1	6	—	—	—	—	—	—
1978–79	Los Angeles Blades	PHL	21	7	14	21	42	—	—	—	—	—
1978–79	Toledo Goaldiggers	IHL	1	0	1	1	0	—	—	—	—	—
1979–80	Toledo Goaldiggers	IHL	56	30	26	56	68	4	0	4	4	6
1980–81	Toledo Goaldiggers	IHL	79	32	52	84	69	—	—	—	—	—
1981–82	Binghamton Whalers	AHL	74	47	43	90	44	14	7	8	15	8
1982–83	Hartford Whalers	NHL	62	18	19	37	18	—	—	—	—	—
1982–83	Binghamton Whalers	AHL	18	18	14	32	2	5	5	3	8	0
1983–84	Binghamton Whalers	AHL	76	33	47	80	48	—	—	—	—	—
1984–85	HC Bolzano	ITA	26	47	40	87	28	9	17	6	23	12
1985–86	HC Bolzano	ITA	36	54	53	107	76	7	8	11	19	6
1986–87	BSC Preussen	GER-2	34	39	39	78	91	17	9	7	16	39
1987–88	EHC Lustenau	AUT	13	11	4	15	12	—	—	—	—	—
1987–88	HC La Chaux-de-Fonds	NLB	4	4	3	7	4	—	—	—	—	—
1987–88	Asiago	ITA	21	25	21	46	29	7	5	12	17	9
1988–89	Rotterdam Panda's	NED	—	—	—	—	—	—	—	—	—	—
1997–98	EC Pfaffenhofen	GER-3	17	12	15	27	20	—	—	—	—	—
IHL totals			201	89	106	195	197	21	3	13	16	22
NHL totals			62	18	19	37	18	—	—	—	—	—
