= Lou Vairo =

American ice hockey coach (born 1945)

- Born: February 25, 1945 (age 81); Brooklyn, New York, U.S.
- Occupations: Ice hockey coach and administrator
- Known for: USA Hockey and IIHF executive, Head coach of the United States, the Netherlands and Italy national teams
- Awards: Lester Patrick Trophy (2000); Paul Loicq Award (2010); US Hockey Hall of Fame (2014)

Louis Joseph Vairo (born February 25, 1945) is an American former ice hockey coach and administrator. He served as head coach of the United States men's junior team at five IIHF World U20 Championships, and the United States men's team at four Ice Hockey World Championships and the 1984 Winter Olympics. He was an advance scout for the United States gold medal team at the 1980 Winter Olympics, and was an assistant coach on the United States silver medal team at the 2002 Winter Olympics. He has also served as head coach of the Netherlands men's team and the Italy men's team at the Ice Hockey World Championships. Vairo has coached in professional hockey leagues in Europe, won a Serie A championship with HC Milano Saima, and served as an assistant coach for the New Jersey Devils. In junior ice hockey, he won five Metropolitan Junior Hockey League championships and the New York State junior championship, and coached the Austin Mavericks to two Midwest Junior Hockey League championships and one national championship.

Vairo showed an early interest in the European style of hockey and attended a coaching clinic taught by Anatoly Tarasov of the Soviet Union national team. Vairo introduced European coaching concepts to the United States, and based his coaching style on a blend of Soviet and Canadian coaching methods to fit the culture in America and taught teams to play with speed and not rely on fighting. He served as coaching director of the Amateur Hockey Association of the United States, and later as the director of special projects for USA Hockey. He invited players from non-traditional hockey areas to national development camps to give an opportunity to those would not usually get a chance. He implemented coaching education programs and published manuals and articles about coaching hockey. He sat on the International Ice Hockey Federation coaching committee, and served as the technical coordinator of ice hockey for the Italian Ice Sports Federation. Vairo was awarded the Lester Patrick Trophy for service to American hockey, the Paul Loicq Award for contributions to international hockey, and was inducted into the United States Hockey Hall of Fame.

== Early life ==
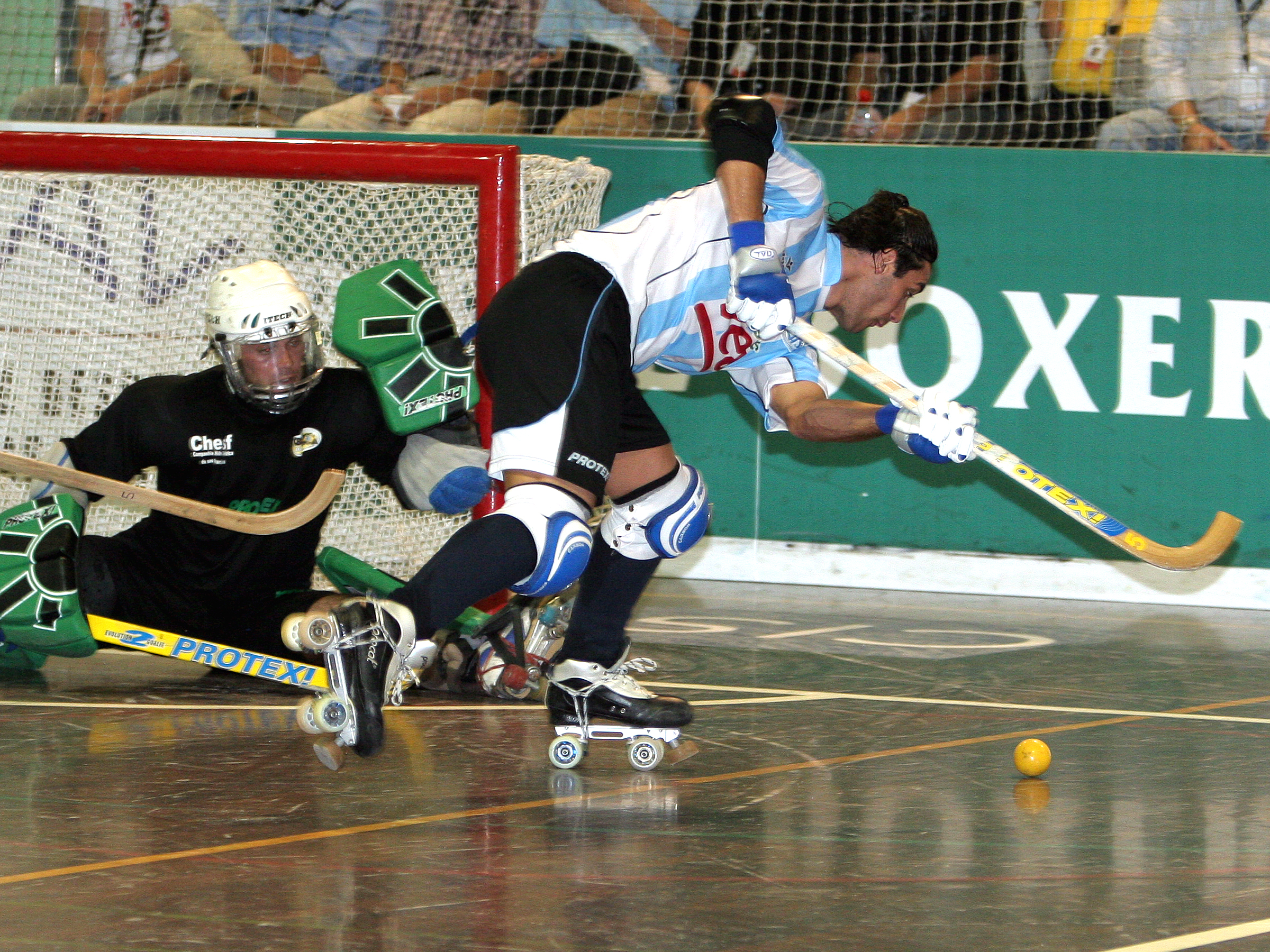
Example of hockey on roller skates.

Vairo was born on February 25, 1945, in Brooklyn, New York. His family is of Italian descent, and he grew up in the neighborhood of Canarsie. He and his friends played street hockey and roller hockey as a boy since there were no ice hockey rinks in Brooklyn. They used improvised equipment for games, including a roll of tape for a puck, goal posts constructed from wood and fishing net, and goalie pads made from couch cushions and inner tubes. Vairo recalled that they played daily, and sometimes on a frozen a swamp during winter using second-hand ice skates.

Vairo began playing organized sports in a roller hockey league for children ages 10 to 12. He played on a team called the Canarsie Rangers. They were inspired to join a league after a chance encounter with a man who taught them how to play, when "a beat-up old car drove up with "A-1 Pest Control" painted on the side". Vairo dreamed of playing for the New York Rangers, and as a boy he attended games at Madison Square Garden III in the cheap seats. His favorite players included Andy Bathgate, Rod Gilbert, Harry Howell, Jean Ratelle and Gump Worsley.

Vairo served two years in the United States Army and was discharged in 1966. He later worked as an air conditioner repairman and short-order cook.

== Career ==
=== Early coaching career ===
Vairo began his coaching career when a friend who organized the league he played in asked him to coach a midget-age team. Vairo later stated that he thought the term midget referred to dwarves instead of the minor ice hockey age group for 15-year-olds. He knew nothing of coaching at the time, and was simply instructed, "you go on the bench and organize them". Vairo went to the library the following day to get a copy of The Hockey Handbook to find out as much as he could. He later talked his way into attending a New York Rangers practice to learn more.

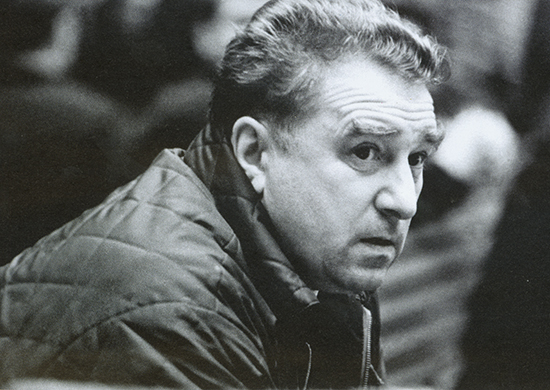
Anatoly Tarasov

Vairo watched a match televised on Wide World of Sports between the Soviet Union national team and the Sweden national team in 1970, and was fascinated by the European style of hockey. He wrote a letter to Anatoly Tarasov who coached the Soviets, wanting to learn more about the style of play. Tarasov wrote back and invited Vairo to attend coaching clinic. Vairo obtained a US$3,500 bank loan to travel to Moscow, and stayed with Tarasov's family in the summer prior to the 1972 Summit Series. He learned new methods of workouts and training on dry land which were not practiced in North America at the time, and Tarasov's methods of motivating players. Vairo stated, "He told me you don't coach with your feet, you coach with your heart and your brain, and you have to have leadership qualities, drive the boys, work them hard, but do everything you can to support them". Vairo introduced European coaching concepts to the United States, and based his style on a blend of Soviet and Canadian coaching methods, and said that he "tried to mend them together to fit the culture of our people" in the United States.

Vairo returned to New York, then coached in several different age groups within the Metropolitan Junior Hockey League. He introduced European coaching concepts for training, and put emphasis on puck control, passing and speed. His teams had a reputation for being the fittest in the league and did not rely on fighting. His teams won five Junior B-level league championships in Brooklyn and The Bronx, and the New York State junior championship in 1975. He moved to Austin, Minnesota in 1975 and coached the Austin Mavericks in the Midwest Junior Hockey League to two league championships and one national championship in 1976.

=== Early U.S. national coaching duties ===
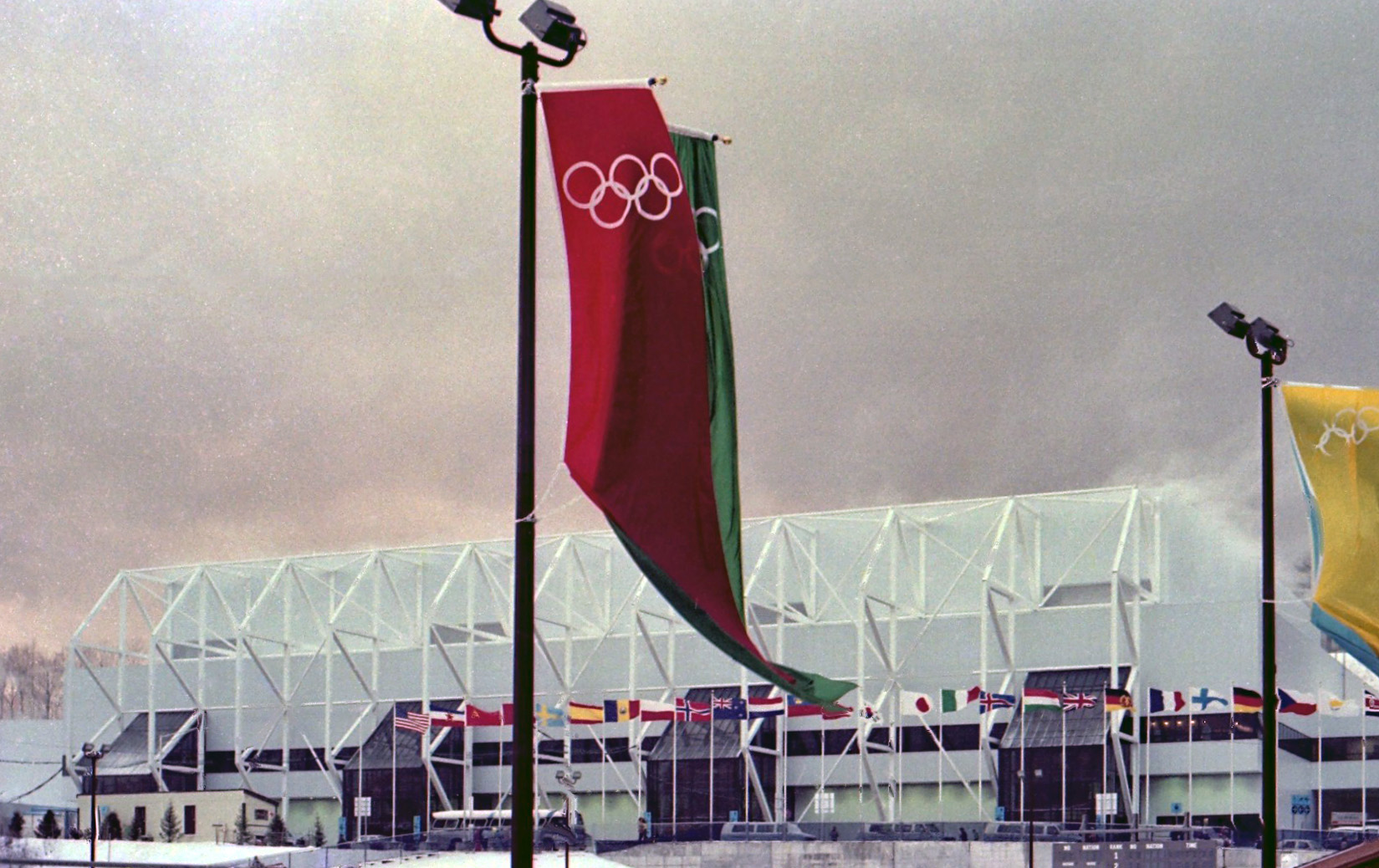
Hockey arena at the 1980 Winter Olympics in Lake Placid

Vairo joined the Amateur Hockey Association of the United States (AHAUS) in 1978 as its coaching director. He lobbied AHAUS executive director Hal Trumble for permission and funding, to invite players from all over the country to the national development camp at Blyth Arena in Squaw Valley, California. Vairo insisted on inviting players from non-traditional hockey areas including the Sun Belt, since he felt that experience could change the lives of potential national players who otherwise wouldn't be given an opportunity. He related the choice to his own life, that if he had been born in Minnesota instead of Brooklyn, he might have played in the National Hockey League (NHL).

Vairo's work at the development camp transitioned into him coaching the United States men's national junior ice hockey team in the A-pool at the IIHF World U20 Championships from 1979 to 1982. He led the team to sixth place in 1979, seventh place in 1980, and sixth place in both 1981 and 1982. He also served as an advance scout for Herb Brooks who coached the United States team which won the gold medal in ice hockey at the 1980 Winter Olympics at Lake Placid, New York.

Vairo became head coach of the United States men's national ice hockey team in 1983, and led them to a first-place finish in Group B at the 1983 Ice Hockey World Championships, and earned a berth in ice hockey at the 1984 Winter Olympics. The team he took to the Olympics in Sarajevo had an average age of 20.7 years old, which was the youngest composition of the national team at the time. The team featured future NHL star Chris Chelios on defense, along with a forward line nicknamed the "diaper line" due to the young ages of Pat LaFontaine, David Jensen and Eddie Olczyk. Vairo led the team to two wins, two losses and two draw, and a seventh-place finish. He felt that team did not play to its potential, and believed that he had "acted too soft" in coaching them. It was the worst Olympic result for the United States hockey team at the time. Vairo stated that, "I took the Olympic coaching position in 1984 because no one else wanted it" due to the daunting task of defending the gold medal from 1980.

=== New Jersey Devils assistant coach ===
Vairo served as an assistant coach to Doug Carpenter for two seasons on the New Jersey Devils. The team failed to qualify for the playoffs in either the 1984–85 NHL season or the 1985–86 NHL season.

=== Coaching in European leagues ===
Vairo began coaching in Europe in 1986, when he moved to the Tilburg Trappers who played in the Eredivisie in the Netherlands. He led the team to a sixth-place finish during the 1986–87 season. He was also head coach of the Netherlands men's national ice hockey team at the 1987 Ice Hockey World Championships, with Ron Berteling as his team captain. The national team placed seventh in Group B, and were relegated to Group C for the next World Championships. Vairo departed for Italy in 1987, and recommended former New Jersey Devils colleague Fred Shero to take over coaching duties in Tilburg.

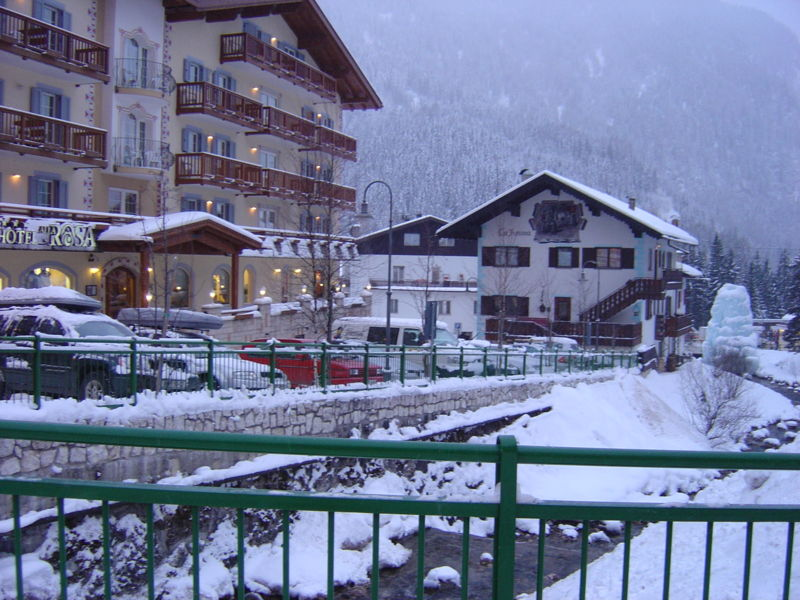
Canazei in winter

Vairo coached five seasons in Italy's Serie A, with the first three seasons in charge of HC Fassa from 1987 to 1990. The team was based in the mountain village of Canazei, and was sponsored by a local winemaker. His team placed fifth during the 1987–88 season, and lost in the first round of the playoffs. He led HC Fassa to an improved fourth-place finish in the 1988–89 season, and were finalists in the Serie A playoffs. In the 1989–90 season, his team placed seventh and did not qualify for the playoffs.

From 1990 to 1992, Vairo served as head coach of HC Milano Saima. He led the team to a first-place finish during the 1990–91 season, and were the Serie A playoffs champions. He returned for the 1991–92 season, and coached the team to third-place finish, and reached the Serie A playoffs finals. He was also an assistant coach of the Italy men's national ice hockey team in Group B at the 1991 Men's Ice Hockey World Championships. Italy won all seven games played, and earned promotion to Group A at the 1992 Men's Ice Hockey World Championships, and a berth in ice hockey at the 1992 Winter Olympics.

=== USA Hockey and IIHF director ===
Vairo returned to the United States in 1992 to work for USA Hockey as the director of special projects. He implemented standards for a coaching education program and for player development camps which lead into the national team programs. He also oversaw a task force on diversity which aimed to introduced hockey skills to children in the inner city and minority groups. He also published several manuals and articles about coaching hockey.

Vairo sat on the International Ice Hockey Federation (IIHF) coaching committee while working at USA Hockey. He established a development camp program at the IIHF, and sought for coaching concepts to be shared internationally. The program aimed to grow the hockey in hockey in Europe and Asia through events in the summer attended by players, coaches and IIHF event staff.

=== Return to U.S. national coaching duties ===
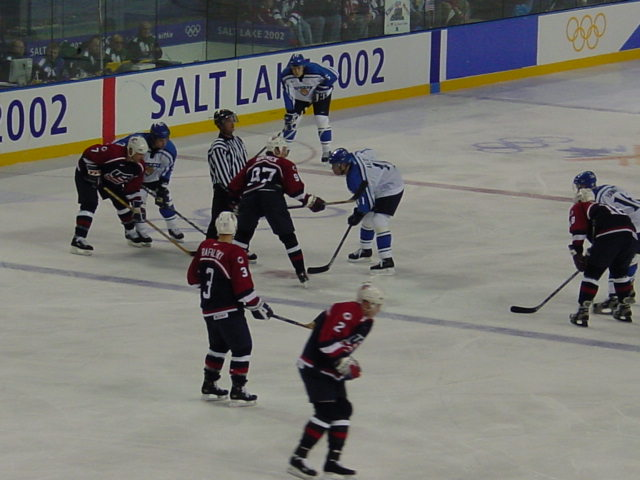
The United States versus Finland in men's hockey at the 2002 Winter Olympics

Vairo returned to the United States men's national ice hockey team as its head coach at the Ice Hockey World Championships from 2000 to 2003. His best result was fourth place in the 2001 IIHF World Championship, which was the closest the team came to a medal since the bronze at the 1996 Men's Ice Hockey World Championships. He was an assistant coach on the national team in ice hockey at the 2002 Winter Olympics, held in Salt Lake City. The team won a silver medal, its first medal in Olympic ice hockey since the 1980 Winter Olympics. He also coached the United States men's national junior ice hockey team in 2003 World Junior Ice Hockey Championships.

=== Italian ice sports and national team ===
Vairo was named technical coordinator of ice hockey by the Italian Ice Sports Federation in 2014, and became head coach of the Italy men's national ice hockey team. He wanted to develop Italian-born players and compose a national team that was "made in Italy". He led the team into the 2015 Men's Ice Hockey World Championships looking to be promoted to the top division of the IIHF. The team placed fifth, and remained in Division I A.

== Personal life ==
Vairo remained friends with Anatoly Tarasov and said, "I'd later invite Tarasov to Brooklyn and he danced and ate spaghetti and meatballs at my grandmother's house, so it became a great friendship and I learned so much from him". Vairo married his secretary Joni Brown in April 1983. They have since resided in Bloomington, Minnesota and Colorado Springs, Colorado. He enjoys the culinary arts, is a gourmet chef, and has raised his own chickens.

== Legacy and awards ==
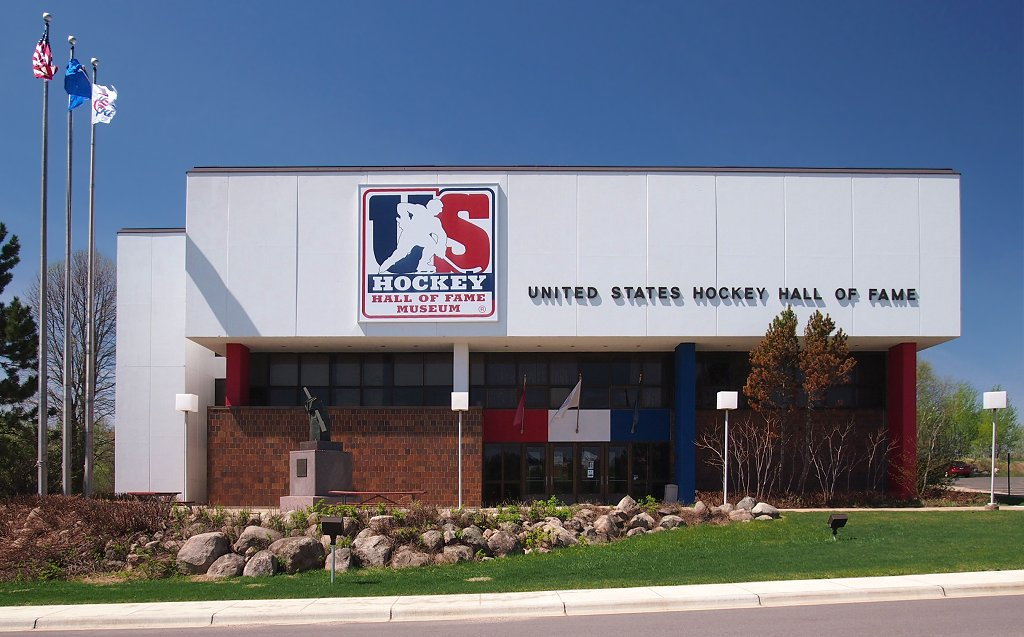
United States Hockey Hall of Fame building in Eveleth, Minnesota

Vairo is referred to as the "Godfather of American Hockey" due to his strong Brooklyn Italian accent. Pat LaFontaine who played for the United States national team described Vairo by saying, "his passion for New York, for his roots in Brooklyn, for the game — he wears it on his sleeve". New Jersey Devils general manager Lou Lamoriello said, "I think it's evident in where the game has come today that you might say Lou was ahead of his time".

In 1994, Vairo received both the John "Snooks" Kelley Founders Award from the American Hockey Coaches Association, and the Walter Yaciuk Award from the USA Hockey Coaching Education Program. He was awarded the Lester Patrick Trophy in 2000, for outstanding service to hockey in the United States. The IIHF named him the Paul Loicq Award recipient in 2010, for contributions to international hockey. In 2014, Vairo was inducted into the New York State Hockey Hall of Fame, and the United States Hockey Hall of Fame.

== Coaching record ==
=== League play ===
Career record as a head coach in league play:

Season	Team	League	Games	Won	Lost	Tied	Win %	Standing	Playoffs	Ref
1975–76	Austin Mavericks	MidJHL	50	28	20	2	0.580	1st place	National champions	
1976–77	Austin Mavericks	MidJHL	48	29	19	0	0.604	2nd place	MidJHL champions	
1986–87	Tilburg Trappers	Eredivisie	45	16	21	8	0.444	6th place	Did not qualify	
1987–88	HC Fassa	Serie A	36	16	15	6	0.528	5th place	Lost in first round	
1988–89	HC Fassa	Serie A	36	17	16	3	0.514	4th place	Serie A finalists	
1989–90	HC Fassa	Serie A	36	11	20	5	0.375	7th place	Did not qualify	
1990–91	HC Milano Saima	Serie A	36	30	5	1	0.847	1st place	Serie A champions	
1991–92	HC Milano Saima	Serie A	18	12	5	1	0.694	3rd place	Serie A finalists	
Totals		MidJHL	98	57	39	2	0.592	two seasons		
Totals		Serie A	162	86	61	16	0.580	five seasons		

=== International events ===
Career record as a head coach at international competitions:

Team	Event	Games	Won	Lost	Tied	Result	Ref
United States u-20	1979 World Juniors	5	2	3	0	6th place in Pool A	
United States u-20	1980 World Juniors	5	1	3	1	7th place in Pool A	
United States u-20	1981 World Juniors	5	2	3	0	6th place in Pool A	
United States u-20	1982 World Juniors	7	2	5	0	6th place in Pool A	
United States	1983 World Championships	7	6	1	0	1st in Group B, promoted to Group A	
United States	1984 Winter Olympics	6	2	2	2	7th place	
Netherlands	1987 World Championships	7	1	5	1	7th in Group B, relegated to Group C	
United States	2000 World Championships	11	6	1	4	5th in top division	
United States	2001 World Championships	11	5	4	2	4th in top division	
United States	2002 World Championships	9	4	4	1	7th in top division	
United States u-20	2003 World Juniors	7	4	3	0	4th place in top division	
United States	2003 World Championships	6	3	3	0	13th in top division	
Italy	2015 World Championships	5	2^{[a]}	3	–	5th in Division I A	
United States u-20 totals		29	11	17	1		
United States men's totals		50	26	15	9		

Note

^{a} One of the two wins by Italy was in overtime. The IIHF calculated standings in 2015 differently than other events in this chart. The overtime win statistic is included in the win column for brevity.
