= Alex Andjelic =

Yugoslav ice hockey player (1940–2021)

- Born: 16 October 1940 Bačka Palanka, Yugoslavia
- Died: 24 March 2021 (aged 80) Belgrade, Serbia
- Position: Forward
- Shot: Left
- Played for: HK Partizan 's-Hertogenbosch Red Eagles; Nijmegen Tigers
- National team: Yugoslavia
- Playing career: 1965–1969

Aleksandar Anđelić (16 October 1940 – 24 March 2021) was a Serbian ice hockey coach. He coached primarily in the Netherlands and Germany, and used to coach the Serbian youth team, while working from Toronto.

Born in Bačka Palanka, Andjelic played for Partizan Belgrade in Belgrade before playing in the Netherlands for clubs 's-Hertogenbosch Red Eagles in 1967–68, Nijmegen Tigers in 1968-69 . He played over 40 times for Yugoslavia.

He played for Yugoslavia at the 1964 Winter Olympics.

He coached with a number of clubs: Nijmegen, Heerenveen Flyers, Rotterdam Panda's, Red Eagles 's-Hertogenbosch, IJHC Den Bosch and Zoetermeer Panters in the Netherlands; Schwenninger Wild Wings, Essen Moskitoes, Deggendorf, Grefrather EC, and Adler Mannheim in Germany; EHC Chur, and Rapperswil-Jona in Switzerland; NS Stars U18 in Hungary; and as a skills coach for the Toronto Maple Leafs of the National Hockey League, and Toronto Marlies of the American Hockey League. He also coached internationally for the Dutch, Yugoslavian, Serbian and Montenegrin, and Turkish men's national teams.

On March 24, 2021, it was announced in Dutch media Andjelic died in a hospital in Belgrade, after a week of being kept in a coma. He had also tested positive for COVID-19.
