= Brad Beck =

Canadian ice hockey player (born 1964)

- Born: February 10, 1964 (age 62) Vancouver, British Columbia, Canada
- Height: 5 ft 9 in (175 cm)
- Weight: 190 lb (86 kg; 13 st 8 lb)
- Position: Defence
- Shot: Right
- Played for: Ässät
- NHL draft: 91st overall, 1982; Chicago Blackhawks
- Playing career: 1986–1993

Brad Beck (born February 10, 1964) is a Canadian former professional ice hockey defenceman. He was drafted in the 5th round, 91st overall by the Chicago Blackhawks in the 1982 NHL entry draft. He never played a single game in NHL but spent two seasons in IHL in Saginaw before heading into Europe.

== Career statistics ==
			Regular season					Playoffs
Season	Team	League	GP	G	A	Pts	PIM	GP	G	A	Pts	PIM
1980–81	Penticton Knights	BCJHL	53	10	24	34	—	—	—	—	—	—
1981–82	Penticton Knights	BCJHL	52	13	32	45	116	—	—	—	—	—
1982–83	Michigan State University	NCAA	42	5	15	20	40	—	—	—	—	—
1983–84	Michigan State University	NCAA	42	2	7	9	67	—	—	—	—	—
1984–85	Michigan State University	NCAA	42	5	18	23	62	—	—	—	—	—
1985–86	Michigan State University	NCAA	41	3	15	18	40	—	—	—	—	—
1986–87	Saginaw Generals	IHL	82	10	24	34	114	10	0	2	2	24
1987–88	Saginaw Hawks	IHL	80	8	22	30	159	9	0	2	2	4
1988–89	Ässät	SM-liiga	16	1	4	5	22	—	—	—	—	—
1989–90	Indianapolis Ice	IHL	34	4	15	19	103	—	—	—	—	—
1989–90	Durham Wasps	BHL	17	17	17	34	70	—	—	—	—	—
1990–91	Richmond Renegades	ECHL	64	12	48	60	130	4	1	1	2	21
1991–92	Flint Bulldogs	CoHL	23	2	6	8	8	—	—	—	—	—
1991–92	Probadge Utrecht	Netherlands	11	4	5	9	14	7	5	2	7	4
1992–93	IJCU Dragons Utrecht	Netherlands	17	6	8	14	90	—	—	—	—	—
IHL totals			196	22	61	83	376	19	0	4	4	28
