= 1995–96 Eredivisie (ice hockey) season =

Dutch ice hockey season

The 1995–96 Eredivisie season was the 36th season of the Eredivisie, the top level of ice hockey in the Netherlands. Six teams participated in the league, and the Tilburg Trappers won the championship.

== Regular season ==
	Club	GP	W	T	L	GF	GA	Pts
1.	Tilburg Trappers	20	16	3	1	123	36	35
2.	Nijmegen Tigers	20	16	1	3	145	58	33
3.	Heerenveen Flyers	20	8	3	9	71	78	19
4.	Eaters Geleen	20	6	6	8	72	66	18
5.	Eindhoven Kemphanen	20	3	5	12	57	139	11
6.	Dordrecht Lions	20	2	0	18	48	139	2*

- (* The Dordrecht Lions had two points deducted)

== Playoffs ==
Quarter-finals
Eindhoven Kemphanen	0
Eaters Geleen	2
Heerenveen Flyers	2
Dordrecht Lions	0

Semi-finals
Tilburg Trappers	3
Eaters Geleen	0
Nijmegen Tigers	3
Heerenveen Flyers	0

Final
Tilburg Trappers	4
Nijmegen Tigers	3
