= 1989–90 Eredivisie (ice hockey) season =

Dutch ice hockey season

The 1989–90 Eredivisie season was the 30th season of the Eredivisie, the top level of ice hockey in the Netherlands. Six teams participated in the league, and the Rotterdam Panda's won the championship.

== Regular season ==
	Club	GP	W	T	L	GF	GA	Pts (Bonus)
1.	Rotterdam Panda’s	10	9	1	0	65	46	25(6)
2.	Eaters Geleen	10	5	2	3	45	44	16(4)
3.	Nijmegen Tigers	10	5	0	5	55	48	15(5)
4.	Utrecht Rheem Racers	10	6	0	4	59	47	15(3)
5.	Tilburg Trappers	10	3	1	6	49	44	9(2)
6.	Heerenveen Flyers	10	0	0	10	30	74	1(1)

== Playoffs ==
Semi-finals
Rotterdam Panda’s	2
Utrecht Rheem Racers	0
Eaters Geleen	0
Nijmegen Tigers	2

Final
Rotterdam Panda’s	3
Nijmegen Tigers	0
Third place
not held
