= Mike Brewer (ice hockey) =

Canadian ice hockey player (born 1969)

- Born: April 13, 1969 (age 55); Chiswick, Ontario, Canada
- Height: 5 ft 10 in (178 cm)
- Weight: 185 lb (84 kg; 13 st 3 lb)
- Position: Defence/Forward
- Shot: Left
- Played for: Brown; HC Vita Hästen; Alleghe Hockey; Utrecht Rheem Racers; HK Vojvodina
- National team: Canada
- NHL draft: 1991 NHL Supplemental Draft; Washington Capitals
- Playing career: 1988–2008

Michael C. Brewer (born April 13, 1969) is a Canadian former professional ice hockey defenceman, forward and coach who was an All-American for Brown.

== Early life ==
Brewer was born in Chisholm, Ontario. After high school Brewer joined the Brown Bears men's ice hockey team. The 1989 Bears won one game out of 26 in their first season under Bob Gaudet. Brewer finished tied for second in scoring as a freshman with just 13 points. The team recovered the following year, including Brewer more than doubling his point production. He was named first-team all-conference for leading the teams's turnaround. Brewer missed six games the following season while studying abroad but was named an alternate captain despite missing time. He had his best output as a senior, again leading the team in scoring and pushing the Bears up to fifth in ECAC Hockey. While the team did not advance past the conference quarterfinals, Brewer was instrumental in Brown's turnaround and was named an All-American for his final season.

== Career ==
Brewer played for Team Canada for a season and then began his professional career in Europe. He saw moderate success with several teams in multiple countries but ended up retiring as a player in 1998. A decade later, while working as the head coach for Serbian junior teams, Brewer played 18 games for HK Vojvodina, his last appearance as a player.

Brewer was inducted into the Brown Athletic Hall of Fame in 1999.

== Personal life ==
Mike's father was Carl Brewer, an NHL defenceman who won three Stanley Cups with the Toronto Maple Leafs.

== Statistics ==
=== Regular season and playoffs ===
			Regular Season					Playoffs
Season	Team	League	GP	G	A	Pts	PIM	GP	G	A	Pts	PIM
1988–89	Brown	ECAC Hockey	23	5	8	13	10	—	—	—	—	—
1989–90	Brown	ECAC Hockey	29	7	24	31	64	—	—	—	—	—
1990–91	Brown	ECAC Hockey	21	4	18	22	44	—	—	—	—	—
1991–92	Brown	ECAC Hockey	28	13	34	47	62	—	—	—	—	—
1992–93	Team Canada	International	55	9	24	33	24	—	—	—	—	—
1993–94	HC Vita Hästen	Division 1	35	5	9	14	48	10	0	3	3	10
1994–95	Alleghe Hockey	Serie A	35	5	18	23	48	—	—	—	—	—
1994–95	Knoxville Cherokees	Alpenliga	14	6	11	17	22	—	—	—	—	—
1994–95	Team Canada	International	2	0	0	0	4	—	—	—	—	—
1996–97	Utrecht Rheem Racers	Eredivisie	22	7	23	30	46	—	—	—	—	—
1997–98	Utrecht Rheem Racers	Eredivisie	33	5	31	36	38	2	0	0	0	4
2007–08	HK Vojvodina	Serbia	22	7	23	30	46	—	—	—	—	—
NCAA totals			101	29	84	113	180	—	—	—	—	—
Eredivisie totals			55	12	54	66	84	2	0	0	0	4

== Awards and honors ==
Award	Year
All-ECAC Hockey First Team	1989–90
All-ECAC Hockey Second Team	1990–91
All-ECAC Hockey First Team	1991–92
AHCA East First-Team All-American	1991–92
