= Dale Henry =

Canadian ice hockey player

- Born: September 24, 1964 (age 61) Prince Albert, Saskatchewan, Canada
- Height: 6 ft 0 in (183 cm)
- Weight: 205 lb (93 kg; 14 st 9 lb)
- Position: Left wing
- Shot: Left
- Played for: New York Islanders
- NHL draft: 157th overall, 1983; New York Islanders
- Playing career: 1984–2002

Dale "Hank" Henry (born September 24, 1964) is a Canadian former professional ice hockey forward who played 132 games in the National Hockey League for the New York Islanders.

Henry was born in Prince Albert, Saskatchewan, and has been married to his wife, Rebecca Henry, since 1996.

== Career statistics ==
			Regular season					Playoffs
Season	Team	League	GP	G	A	Pts	PIM	GP	G	A	Pts	PIM
1981–82	Saskatoon Blades	WHL	32	5	4	9	50	5	0	0	0	0
1982–83	Saskatoon Blades	WHL	63	21	19	40	213	3	0	0	0	12
1983–84	Saskatoon Blades	WHL	71	41	36	77	162	—	—	—	—	—
1984–85	New York Islanders	NHL	16	2	1	3	19	—	—	—	—	—
1984–85	Springfield Indians	AHL	67	11	20	31	133	4	0	0	0	13
1985–86	New York Islanders	NHL	7	1	3	4	15	—	—	—	—	—
1985–86	Springfield Indians	AHL	64	14	26	40	162	—	—	—	—	—
1986–87	New York Islanders	NHL	19	3	3	6	46	8	0	0	0	2
1986–87	Springfield Indians	AHL	23	9	14	23	49	—	—	—	—	—
1987–88	New York Islanders	NHL	48	5	15	20	115	6	1	0	1	17
1987–88	Springfield Indians	AHL	24	9	12	21	103	—	—	—	—	—
1988–89	New York Islanders	NHL	22	2	2	4	66	—	—	—	—	—
1988–89	Springfield Indians	AHL	50	13	21	34	83	—	—	—	—	—
1989–90	New York Islanders	NHL	20	0	2	2	2	—	—	—	—	—
1989–90	Springfield Indians	AHL	43	17	14	31	68	18	3	5	8	33
1990–91	Albany Choppers	IHL	55	16	22	38	87	—	—	—	—	—
1990–91	Springfield Indians	AHL	20	5	9	14	31	18	2	7	9	24
1991–92	Muskegon Lumberjacks	IHL	39	5	17	22	28	14	1	4	5	36
1992–93	Gunco Panda's Rotterdam	NED	34	28	27	55	149	—	—	—	—	—
1993–94	Milwaukee Admirals	IHL	49	5	11	16	104	—	—	—	—	—
1994–95	San Antonio Iguanas	CHL	55	28	36	64	120	13	6	8	14	25
1995–96	San Antonio Iguanas	CHL	62	27	40	67	177	11	3	8	11	14
1996–97	San Antonio Iguanas	CHL	23	12	19	31	48	—	—	—	—	—
1997–98	Shreveport Mudbugs	WPHL	66	34	46	80	91	8	3	5	8	29
1998–99	Shreveport Mudbugs	WPHL	64	36	33	69	90	12	7	7	14	16
1999–00	Shreveport Mudbugs	WPHL	69	28	42	70	49	12	5	5	10	4
2000–01	Bossier-Shreveport Mudbugs	WPHL	66	30	31	61	34	14	8	2	10	17
2001–02	Bossier-Shreveport Mudbugs	CHL	12	3	4	7	9	—	—	—	—	—
NHL totals			132	13	26	39	263	14	1	0	1	19
AHL totals			291	78	116	194	629	40	5	12	17	70
