= 1988–89 Eredivisie (ice hockey) season =

Dutch ice hockey season

The 1988–89 Eredivisie season was the 29th season of the Eredivisie, the top level of ice hockey in the Netherlands. Eight teams participated in the league, and the Rotterdam Panda's won the championship.

== First round ==
| | Club | GP | W | T | L | GF | GA | Pts |
|---|---|---|---|---|---|---|---|---|
| 1. | Nijmegen Tigers | 28 | 21 | 3 | 4 | 157 | 113 | 45 |
| 2. | Rotterdam Panda’s | 28 | 20 | 1 | 7 | 212 | 93 | 41 |
| 3. | Heerenveen Flyers | 28 | 18 | 2 | 8 | 173 | 96 | 38 |
| 4. | Eaters Geleen | 28 | 18 | 2 | 8 | 170 | 94 | 38 |
| 5. | Tilburg Trappers | 28 | 10 | 4 | 14 | 127 | 122 | 24 |
| 6. | Amstel Tijgers Amsterdam | 28 | 9 | 3 | 16 | 120 | 155 | 21 |
| 7. | S.IJ. Den Bosch | 28 | 7 | 2 | 19 | 114 | 198 | 16 |
| 8. | IJHC Assen | 28 | 0 | 1 | 27 | 68 | 270 | 1 |

== Second round ==
| | Club | GP | W | T | L | GF | GA | Pts (Bonus) |
|---|---|---|---|---|---|---|---|---|
| 1. | Rotterdam Panda’s | 10 | 7 | 0 | 3 | 65 | 46 | 19(5) |
| 2. | Nijmegen Tigers | 10 | 5 | 0 | 5 | 45 | 44 | 16(6) |
| 3. | Eaters Geleen | 10 | 6 | 1 | 3 | 55 | 48 | 16(3) |
| 4. | Tilburg Trappers | 10 | 5 | 1 | 4 | 59 | 47 | 13(2) |
| 5. | Heerenveen Flyers | 10 | 4 | 1 | 5 | 49 | 44 | 13(4) |
| 6. | Amstel Tijgers Amsterdam | 10 | 1 | 1 | 6 | 30 | 74 | 4(1) |

== Playoffs ==
Semi-finals
Rotterdam Panda’s | 2
Tilburg Trappers | 1
Nijmegen Tigers | 0
Eaters Geleen | 2

Final
Rotterdam Panda’s | 3
Eaters Geleen | 2
Third place
not held
