= Bill Wensink =

Canadian ice hockey player (born 1958)

- Born: July 15, 1958 (age 68); Kingston, Ontario, Canada
- Relatives: John Wensink (cousin)
Ice hockey career
- Height: 183 cm (6 ft 0 in)
- Weight: 85 kg (187 lb; 13 st 5 lb)
- Position: Defence
- Shoots: Right-handed
- Played for: Kingston Canadians (1976-78); Nijmegen Tigers (1978-85); Smoke Eaters Geleen (1985-87); Nijmegen Tigers (1987-88); Rotterdam Panda's (1988-92)
- National team: Netherlands

Bill Wensink (born July 15, 1958 in Kingston, Ontario) is a Canadian former ice hockey player. A Dutch Canadian, he spent 14 years playing in the Eredivisie and in two IIHF World Championships for the Netherlands national ice hockey team.

Wensink played in tier-I junior hockey, recording an assist and 2 penalty minutes in two games with Kingston Canadiens. Wensink joined Nijmegen Tigers in 1978, staying with the club until 1985. In his final year at Nijmegen, he played with his cousin John Wensink. He spent the next two years with Smoke Eaters Geleen and then for 1987-8 again for one last season for Nijmegen. Wensink spent this final four seasons with Rotterdam Panda's. Wensink played seven games in each in the 1987 World Ice Hockey Championships and the 1991 Men's World Ice Hockey Championships. Going scoreless in 1991, he recorded 2 goals and 2 assists in 1987.
