= 1980 World Junior Ice Hockey Championships =

1980 IIHF World U20 Championship
Tournament details
- Host country: Finland
- Venue(s): 2 (in 2 host cities)
- Dates: December 27, 1979 – January 2, 1980
- Teams: 8

Final positions
- Champions: Soviet Union (4th title)
- Runner-up: Finland
- Third place: Sweden
- Fourth place: Czechoslovakia

Tournament statistics
- Games played: 20
- Goals scored: 178 (8.9 per game)
- Attendance: 60,784 (3,039 per game)
- Scoring leader(s): (Soviet Union) Vladimir Krutov (11 points)

The 1980 World Junior Ice Hockey Championships (1980 WJHC) was the fourth edition of the Ice Hockey World Junior Championship and was held from December 27, 1979, until January 2, 1980. The tournament was held in Helsinki, Finland. The Soviet Union won its fourth consecutive gold medal, while Finland won the silver, and Sweden the bronze.

== Pool A ==
The 1980 tournament divided participants into two divisions of four teams, each playing three games. The top two teams in each division advanced to the championship round, while the bottom two were placed in the consolation round. Each division played another round robin. The top three teams in the championship won the gold, silver and bronze medals. Teams that faced each other in the first round had their results carried over to the final rounds.

=== Final standings ===
This is the aggregate standings, ordered according to final placing. The four teams in the championship round were ranked one through four, while the four teams in the consolation round were ranked five through eight regardless of overall record.

Pos	Team	Pld	W	L	D	GF	GA	GD	Pts
1	Soviet Union	5	5	0	0	24	9	+15	10
2	Finland	5	4	1	0	29	8	+21	8
3	Sweden	5	2	2	1	23	15	+8	5
4	Czechoslovakia	5	2	3	0	28	27	+1	4
5	Canada	5	3	2	0	25	18	+7	6
6	West Germany	5	2	3	0	15	28	−13	4
7	United States	5	1	3	1	21	26	−5	3
8	Switzerland	5	0	5	0	13	47	−34	0

Source: Hockey Canada

Switzerland was relegated to Pool B for the 1981 World Junior Ice Hockey Championships.

=== Preliminary round ===
==== Gold group ====
Team	Pld	W	L	D	GF	GA	GD	Pts
Soviet Union	3	3	0	0	16	6	+10	6
Finland	3	2	1	0	22	4	+18	4
Canada	3	1	2	0	15	15	0	2
Switzerland	3	0	3	0	6	34	−28	0

Source: Hockey Canada

December 27, 1979	Finland	2 – 1 (1–0, 0–1, 1–0)	Canada	Helsinki

December 27, 1979	Soviet Union	6 – 0 (1–0, 3–0, 2–0)	Switzerland	Helsingin Jäähalli

December 28, 1979	Soviet Union	8 – 5 (4–1, 1–3, 3–1)	Canada	Vantaa

December 28, 1979	Finland	19 – 1 (6–0, 6–0, 7–1)	Switzerland	Helsinki

December 30, 1979	Canada	9 – 5 (4–1, 2–2, 3–2)	Switzerland	Vantaa

December 30, 1979	Finland	1 – 2 (0–1, 0–0, 1–1)	Soviet Union	Helsinki

==== Blue group ====
Team	Pld	W	L	D	GF	GA	GD	Pts
Sweden	3	2	0	1	20	10	+10	5
Czechoslovakia	3	2	1	0	24	17	+7	4
West Germany	3	1	2	0	10	20	−10	2
United States	3	0	2	1	10	17	−7	1

Source: Hockey Canada

December 27, 1979	United States	3 – 7 (1–1, 1–1, 1–5)	Czechoslovakia	Vantaa

December 27, 1979	Sweden	5 – 1 (1–0, 2–1, 2–0)	West Germany	Vantaa

December 28, 1979	Sweden	5 – 5 (3–1, 2–2, 0–2)	United States	Vantaa

December 28, 1979	Czechoslovakia	13 – 4 (5–1, 5–1, 3–2)	West Germany	Vantaa

December 30, 1979	West Germany	5 – 2 (3–0, 0–2, 2–0)	United States	Helsingin Jäähalli

December 30, 1979	Sweden	10 – 4 (3–1, 4–0, 3–3)	Czechoslovakia	Helsinki

=== Consolation round ===
Results from any games played during the preliminary round were carried forward to the consolation round.

Team	Pld	W	L	D	GF	GA	GD	Pts
Canada	3	3	0	0	19	8	+11	6
West Germany	3	2	1	0	10	10	0	4
United States	3	1	2	0	13	14	−1	2
Switzerland	3	0	3	0	12	22	−10	0

Source: Hockey Canada

January 1, 1980	Canada	4 – 2 (0–0, 3–2, 1–0)	United States	Helsingin Jäähalli

January 1, 1980	West Germany	4 – 2 (2–1, 1–0, 1–1)	Switzerland	Vantaa

January 2, 1980	Canada	6 – 1 (1–0, 4–0, 1–1)	West Germany	Helsinki

January 2, 1980	United States	9 – 5 (1–1, 4–2, 4–2)	Switzerland	Vantaa

=== Championship round ===
Results from any games played during the preliminary round were carried forward to the championship round.

Team	Pld	W	L	D	GF	GA	GD	Pts
Soviet Union	3	3	0	0	10	4	+6	6
Finland	3	2	1	0	8	6	+2	4
Sweden	3	1	2	0	13	9	+4	2
Czechoslovakia	3	0	3	0	8	20	−12	0

Source: Hockey Canada

January 1, 1980	Finland	3 – 2 (0–1, 3–0, 0–1)	Sweden	Helsinki

January 1, 1980	Soviet Union	6 – 2 (0–1, 1–1, 5–0)	Czechoslovakia	Helsinki

January 2, 1980	Finland	4 – 2 (1–1, 1–1, 2–0)	Czechoslovakia	Helsingin Jäähalli

January 2, 1980	Soviet Union	2 – 1 (0–1, 2–0, 0–0)	Sweden	Helsingin Jäähalli

=== Scoring leaders ===
Rank	Player	Country	G	A	Pts
1	Vladimir Krutov	Soviet Union	7	4	11
2	Jari Kurri	Finland	4	7	11
3	Håkan Loob	Sweden	7	2	9
4	Ján Vodila	Czechoslovakia	6	2	8
5	Kari Jalonen	Finland	3	5	8
6	Dusan Pasek	Czechoslovakia	6	1	7
7	Reijo Ruotsalainen	Finland	4	3	7
8	Dino Ciccarelli	Canada	5	1	6
9	Ari Lahteenmäki	Finland	4	2	6
9	Scott Carlston	United States	4	2	6

=== Tournament awards ===
	IIHF Directorate Awards	Media All-Star Team
Goaltender	(Finland) Jari Paavola	(Finland) Jari Paavola
Defencemen	(Finland) Reijo Ruotsalainen	(Sweden) Tomas Jonsson (Finland) Reijo Ruotsalainen
Forwards	(Soviet Union) Vladimir Krutov	(Sweden) Håkan Loob (Soviet Union) Igor Larionov (Soviet Union) Vladimir Krutov

== Pool B ==
The second tier of the World Junior Championship was contested in Klagenfurt, Austria from March 7 to 13, 1980. Eight teams were divided into two groups of four that played a round robin, followed by placement games against the respective team in the other group. The Hungarian team made their first appearance this year.

=== Preliminary round ===
==== Group A ====
Team	Pld	W	L	D	GF	GA	GD	Pts
Austria	3	3	0	0	29	6	+23	6
Norway	3	2	1	0	22	7	+15	4
Denmark	3	1	2	0	14	17	−3	2
Hungary	3	0	3	0	9	44	−35	0

Norway	6 – 2 (3–1, 2–0, 1–1)	Denmark

Austria	19 – 3 (10–1, 6–0, 3–2)	Hungary

Austria	8 – 2	Denmark

Hungary	3 – 15	Norway

Denmark	10 – 3	Hungary

Austria	2 – 1	Norway

==== Group B ====
Team	Pld	W	L	D	GF	GA	GD	Pts
Poland	3	3	0	0	27	6	+21	6
Netherlands	3	2	1	0	16	10	+6	4
Italy	3	1	2	0	10	16	−6	2
France	3	0	3	0	8	29	−21	0

France	2 – 8 (2–4, 0–1, 0–3)	Italy

Poland	5 – 3 (4–2, 1–1, 0–0)	Netherlands

Poland	12 – 2	France

Italy	1 – 4	Netherlands

France	4 – 9	Netherlands

Poland	10 – 1	Italy

=== Final round ===
==== 7th place game ====
France	11 – 2	Hungary

==== 5th place game ====
Denmark	4 – 2	Italy

==== 3rd place game ====
Norway	6 – 3	Netherlands

==== 1st place game ====
Austria	4 – 3	Poland

Austria was promoted to Pool A for the 1981 World Junior Ice Hockey Championships.

=== Scoring leaders ===
Rank	Player	Country	G	A	Pts
1	Petter Thoresen	Norway	9	2	11
2	Thomas Cijan	Austria	7	2	9
3	Peter Raffl	Austria	8	0	8
4	Fred Homburg	Netherlands	6	2	8
5	Marek Bomba	Poland	3	5	8
