= Scott Drevitch =

American ice hockey player

- Born: 9 September 1965 (age 61) Brookline, Massachusetts, U.S.
- Height: 5 ft 10 in (178 cm)
- Weight: 178 lb (81 kg; 12 st 10 lb)
- Position: Defense
- Shot: Right
- Played for: Maine Mariners; Maine Mariners; New Haven Nighthawks; Cleveland Barons; ECHL; Virginia Lancers; Richmond Renegades; Dayton Bombers; Jacksonville Lizard Kings; Huntington Blizzard; IHL; Albany Choppers; Phoenix Roadrunners; San Diego Gulls; Grand Rapids Griffins; Las Vegas Thunder; WCHL; Tacoma Sabercats; UHL; Port Huron Beacons; Adirondack IceHawks; Adirondack Frostbite; Elmira Jackals; Europe; Innsbrucker EV (Austria); Tilburg Trappers (Netherlands); Borås HC (Swe-1)
- NHL draft: not drafted
- Playing career: 1988–2007

Scott Drevitch (born 9 September 1965) is an American former ice hockey and roller hockey defenseman.

== Ice hockey ==
Following a collegiate career with the University of Maine Black Bears and the University of Lowell Riverhawks, Drevitch was assigned to the Boston Bruins' East Coast Hockey League affiliate Maine Mariners. He played a full season for the Mariners, showing the offensive flair he would enjoy throughout his playing days, but concerns about size in an era where smaller, more mobile defensemen were not the norm saw him spending four of his first five professional seasons almost entirely in the ECHL.

Drevitch ultimately spent most of 18 seasons in the mid- to low-minor leagues. He played five seasons with the Tacoma Sabercats of the West Coast Hockey League, and was the career leader in games played, assists and scoring for the franchise; he also played three seasons for the Adirondack Frostbite of the United Hockey League, as well as playing for a number of teams in the ECHL, the IHL, UHL, ECHL, and WCHL, but never the NHL. He also played in Sweden, Austria, and the Netherlands.

His final season was in 2007 with the Elmira Jackals of the UHL; at the time of his retirement, he was the final player for the Albany Choppers, New Haven Nighthawks and Maine Mariners franchises active in pro hockey.

== Roller hockey ==
Drevitch played five seasons of major league inline hockey with Roller Hockey International playing with the Atlanta Fire Ants (1994), Oklahoma Coyotes (1995 and 1996), Los Angeles Blades (1997) and San Jose Rhinos (1999).

Drevitch currently runs a series of hockey camps in upstate New York and Cape Cod, is a coach for the Bridgewater Bandits Tier II organization in the Eastern Junior Hockey League, and briefly the Division 3 Middleboro Sachems high school hockey team.

== Career statistics ==
			Regular season					Playoffs
Season	Team	League	GP	G	A	Pts	PIM	GP	G	A	Pts	PIM
1984–85	University of Maine	NCAA	33	2	7	9	14	—	—	—	—	—
1985–86	University of Massachusetts Lowell	NCAA	32	1	8	9	10	—	—	—	—	—
1986–87	University of Massachusetts Lowell	NCAA	35	3	25	28	24	—	—	—	—	—
1987–88	University of Massachusetts Lowell	NCAA	37	5	21	26	28	—	—	—	—	—
1988–89	Maine Mariners	ECHL	75	10	21	31	51	—	—	—	—	—
1989–90	Virginia Lancers	ECHL	40	14	31	45	46	4	3	3	6	10
1989–90	Maine Mariners	ECHL	13	0	1	1	10	—	—	—	—	—
1990–91	New Haven Nighthawks	American Hockey League	14	1	6	7	4	—	—	—	—	—
1990–91	Phoenix Roadrunners	IHL	3	0	1	1	4	—	—	—	—	—
1990–91	Albany Choppers	IHL	20	2	9	11	13	—	—	—	—	—
1990–91	Hammarby IF	Division 1	17	2	5	7	46	—	—	—	—	—
1991–92	Richmond Renegades	ECHL	49	7	42	49	26	7	0	5	5	4
1991–92	San Diego Gulls	IHL	7	0	0	0	13	—	—	—	—	—
1992–93	Richmond Renegades	ECHL	34	8	18	26	16	—	—	—	—	—
1992–93	Dayton Bombers	ECHL	27	9	21	30	20	3	2	4	6	2
1993–94	Innsbrucker EV	Austria 1	34	14	49	63	37	—	—	—	—	—
1994–95	Couwenberg Trappers Tilburg	Netherlands	24	10	31	41	14	6	2	5	7	4
1995–96	Jacksonville Lizard Kings	ECHL	23	5	11	16	83	—	—	—	—	—
1995–96	Huntington Blizzard	ECHL	45	8	22	30	52	—	—	—	—	—
1996–97	Borås HC	Division 2	34	18	17	35	—	—	—	—	—	—
1997–98	Tacoma Sabercats	WCHL	57	11	64	75	85	10	2	7	9	18
1997–98	Grand Rapids Griffins	IHL	3	0	0	0	0	—	—	—	—	—
1997–98	Las Vegas Thunder	IHL	8	0	1	1	2	—	—	—	—	—
1998–99	Las Vegas Thunder	IHL	1	0	0	0	0	—	—	—	—	—
1998–99	Tacoma Sabercats	WCHL	70	11	64	75	79	11	4	11	15	12
1999–00	Tacoma Sabercats	WCHL	58	14	51	65	23	10	0	6	6	4
2000–01	Tacoma Sabercats	WCHL	69	14	37	51	34	5	1	2	3	0
2001–02	Tacoma Sabercats	WCHL	67	8	39	47	32	10	0	6	6	0
2002–03	Cleveland Barons	AHL	2	1	0	1	2	—	—	—	—	—
2002–03	Port Huron Beacons	UHL	75	13	50	63	46	3	0	1	1	0
2003–04	Adirondack IceHawks	UHL	76	10	48	58	32	—	—	—	—	—
2004–05	Adirondack Frostbite	UHL	80	13	48	61	71	6	3	4	7	8
2005–06	Adirondack Frostbite	UHL	70	14	44	58	62	6	0	8	8	0
2006–07	Elmira Jackals	UHL	76	7	25	32	83	—	—	—	—	—
AHL totals			104	12	28	40	67	—	—	—	—	—

== See also ==
- List of select Jewish ice hockey players
