= 1968–69 Eredivisie (ice hockey) season =

Dutch ice hockey season

The 1968–69 Eredivisie season was the ninth season of the Eredivisie, the top level of ice hockey in the Netherlands. Three teams participated in the league, and HYS Den Haag won the championship.

== Regular season ==
	Club	GP	W	T	L	GF	GA	Pts
1.	H.H.IJ.C. Den Haag	8	8	0	0	62	20	16
2.	T.IJ.S.C. Tilburg	8	2	0	6	23	43	4
3.	S.IJ. Den Bosch	8	2	0	6	23	45	4
