= 1969–70 Eredivisie (ice hockey) season =

Dutch ice hockey season

The 1969–70 Eredivisie season was the tenth season of the Eredivisie, the top level of ice hockey in the Netherlands. Four teams participated in the league, and S.IJ. Den Bosch won the championship.

== Regular season ==
	Club	GP	W	T	L	GF	GA	Pts
1.	S.IJ. Den Bosch	6	6	0	0	35	12	12
2.	T.IJ.S.C. Tilburg	6	4	0	2	36	39	8
3.	Eaters Geleen	6	1	0	5	22	31	2
4.	H.H.IJ.C. Den Haag	6	1	0	5	27	38	2
