= 1997–98 Eredivisie (ice hockey) season =

Dutch ice hockey season

The 1997–98 Eredivisie season was the 38th season of the Eredivisie, the top level of ice hockey in the Netherlands. Seven teams participated in the league, and the Nijmegen Tigers won the championship.

== Regular season ==
	Club	GP	W	T	L	GF	GA	Pts
1.	Tilburg Trappers	24	21	0	3	200	48	42
2.	Nijmegen Tigers	24	19	1	4	162	85	39
3.	Heerenveen Flyers	24	16	1	7	178	64	33
4.	Utrecht Rheem Racers	24	13	3	8	107	104	29
5.	H.IJ.S. Hoky Den Haag	24	6	1	17	85	194	13
6.	Eindhoven Kemphanen	24	5	0	19	70	188	10
7.	Phantoms Deurne	24	1	0	23	71	190	2

== Playoffs ==
Semi-finals
Tilburg Trappers	3
Utrecht Rheem Racers	0
Nijmegen Tigers	4
Heerenveen Flyers	1

Final
Tilburg Trappers	1
Nijmegen Tigers	4
Third place
not held

== 5th place round ==
	Club	GP	W	T	L	GF	GA	Pts
1.	Eindhoven Kemphanen	4	3	0	1	25	10	7
2.	H.IJ.S. Hoky Den Haag	4	2	0	2	24	19	4
3.	Phantoms Deurne	4	1	0	3	10	30	1

=== Final for 5th place ===
- Eindhoven Kemphanen - H.IJ.S. Hoky Den Haag 0:3 (4:8, 3:6, 1:6)
