= Alexander Schaafsma =

Dutch ice hockey player

- Born: 28 February 1974 (age 51); Groningen, NED
- Height: 5 ft 9 in (175 cm)
- Weight: 178 lb (81 kg; 12 st 10 lb)
- Position: Defence
- Shoots: Left
- Eredivisie team Former teams: Amstel Tijgers; GIJS Groningen; Rotterdam Panda's; Nijmegen Tigers; Heerenveen Flyers
- Playing career: 1990–present

Alexander Schaafsma (born 28 February 1974 in Groningen) is a Dutch ice hockey player.

== Career ==
A defenceman, Schaafsma began his senior club career in 1990–91 with hometown GIJS Groningen. He played 1991–2 with the Rotterdam Panda's, then 1992-3 and 1993–4 with Nijmegen Tigers. Schaafsma then joined Heerenveen Flyers for the next two and a half seasons.

Schaafsma moved in 1997-98 to Germany briefly and club Grefrather EG. The following season he joined the original Amsterdam Tigers. In 2003-04 he played for Amsterdam Bulldogs before rejoining Heenrenveen the following season. Since 2005, Schaafsma been with Amstel Tijgers. His best offensive season was 2006–07, when he had 42 points in 38 games.

== Sources ==
- Biographical information and career statistics from Eliteprospects.com, or The Internet Hockey Database
