= Bob Bergloff =

American ice hockey player (born 1958)

- Born: July 26, 1958 (age 66); Dickinson, North Dakota, U.S.A.
- Height: 6 ft 1 in (185 cm)
- Weight: 185 lb (84 kg; 13 st 3 lb)
- Position: Defense
- Shot: Right
- Played for: Minnesota North Stars
- NHL draft: 87th overall, 1978; Minnesota North Stars
- Playing career: 1981–1988

Robert Kane Bergloff (born July 26, 1958) is an American retired ice hockey defenseman. He played 2 games in the National Hockey League for the Minnesota North Stars during the 1982–83 season.

== Career statistics ==
=== Regular season and playoffs ===
			Regular season					Playoffs
Season	Team	League	GP	G	A	Pts	PIM	GP	G	A	Pts	PIM
1975–76	Bloomington Kennedy High School	HS-MN	—	—	—	—	—	—	—	—	—	—
1976–77	Bloomington Junior Stars	MidJHL	40	21	21	42	64	—	—	—	—	—
1977–78	University of Minnesota	B1G	32	6	11	17	54	—	—	—	—	—
1978–79	University of Minnesota	B1G	37	1	11	12	48	—	—	—	—	—
1979–80	University of Minnesota	B1G	40	9	22	31	54	—	—	—	—	—
1980–81	University of Minnesota	B1G	45	2	16	18	89	—	—	—	—	—
1981–82	Nashville South Stars	CHL	74	2	20	22	111	3	0	0	0	7
1981–82	Toledo Goaldiggers	IHL	3	1	1	2	11	—	—	—	—	—
1982–83	Minnesota North Stars	NHL	2	0	0	0	5	—	—	—	—	—
1982–83	Birmingham South Stars	CHL	78	6	20	26	156	13	0	4	4	10
1983–84	Salt Lake Golden Eagles	CHL	44	4	17	21	78	2	0	0	0	4
1984–85	Salt Lake Golden Eagles	IHL	9	0	4	4	15	—	—	—	—	—
1985–86	New Haven Nighthawks	AHL	7	0	1	1	7	4	0	2	2	2
1986–87	G.I.J.S. Groningen	NED	—	—	—	—	—	—	—	—	—	—
1987–88	Dundee Tigers	BHL	36	14	44	58	103	—	—	—	—	—
CHL totals			196	12	57	69	345	18	0	4	4	21
NHL totals			2	0	0	0	5	—	—	—	—	—

=== International ===
Year	Team	Event	GP	G	A	Pts	PIM
1977	United States	WJC	7	1	1	2	0
Junior totals			7	1	1	2	0
