= 1996–97 Eredivisie (ice hockey) season =

Dutch ice hockey season

The 1996–97 Eredivisie season was the 37th season of the Eredivisie, the top level of ice hockey in the Netherlands. Eight teams participated in the league, and the Nijmegen Tigers won the championship.

== Regular season ==
	Club	GP	W	T	L	GF	GA	Pts
1.	Heerenveen Flyers	14	13	0	1	84	24	26
2.	Nijmegen Tigers	14	11	0	3	100	33	22
3.	Tilburg Trappers	14	10	1	3	74	34	21
4.	Eaters Geleen	14	6	1	7	59	64	11*
5.	Eindhoven Kemphanen	14	5	0	9	52	59	10
6.	Phantoms Deurne	14	5	0	9	38	89	10
7.	Utrecht Rheem Racers	14	4	0	10	54	81	8
8.	Dordrecht Lions	14	1	0	13	43	120	2

(* The Eaters Geleen had two points deducted)

== Final round ==
	Club	GP	W	T	L	GF	GA	Pts
1.	Nijmegen Tigers	6	5	0	1	37	19	10
2.	Tilburg Trappers	6	3	1	2	27	22	7
3.	Heerenveen Flyers	6	2	1	3	11	18	5
4.	Eaters Geleen	6	1	0	5	21	37	2

== Playoffs ==
Semi-finals
Nijmegen Tigers	4
Eaters Geleen	0
Tilburg Trappers	4
Heerenveen Flyers	3

Final
Nijmegen Tigers	4
Tilburg Trappers	1
Third place
not played
