= 1989–90 IIHF European Cup =

European ice hockey tournament

The 1989–90 European Cup was the 25th edition of the European Cup, IIHF's premier European club ice hockey tournament. The season started on October 13, 1989, and finished on February 4, 1990.

The tournament was won by CSKA Moscow, who won the final group.

== First group round ==
=== Group A ===
(Rotterdam, Netherlands)

| Team #1 | Score | Team #2 |
|---|---|---|
| Français Volants de Paris (France) | 7:7 | (Poland) TMH Polonia Bytom |
| Gunco Panda's Rotterdam (Netherlands) | 10:1 | (United Kingdom) Durham Wasps |
| Durham Wasps (United Kingdom) | 7:7 | (Poland) TMH Polonia Bytom |
| Gunco Panda's Rotterdam (Netherlands) | 5:3 | (France) Français Volants de Paris |
| Gunco Panda's Rotterdam (Netherlands) | 3:3 | (Poland) TMH Polonia Bytom |
| Français Volants de Paris (France) | 5:1 | (United Kingdom) Durham Wasps |

=== Group A standings ===
| Rank | Team | Points |
| 1 | (Netherlands) Gunco Panda's Rotterdam | 5 |
| 2 | (France) Français Volants de Paris | 3 |
| 3 | (Poland) TMH Polonia Bytom | 3 |
| 4 | (United Kingdom) Durham Wasps | 1 |

=== Group B ===
(Bern, Canton of Bern, Switzerland)

| Team #1 | Score | Team #2 |
|---|---|---|
| AS Mastini Varese (Italy) | 18:0 | (Spain) CG Puigcerdà |
| SC Bern (Switzerland) | 7:0 | (Austria) GEV Innsbruck |
| GEV Innsbruck (Austria) | 5:5 | (Italy) AS Mastini Varese |
| SC Bern (Switzerland) | 18:2 | (Spain) CG Puigcerdà |
| GEV Innsbruck (Austria) | 18:3 | (Spain) CG Puigcerdà |
| SC Bern (Switzerland) | 5:1 | (Italy) AS Mastini Varese |

=== Group B standings ===
| Rank | Team | Points |
| 1 | (Switzerland) SC Bern | 6 |
| 2 | (Italy) AS Mastini Varese | 3 |
| 3 | (Austria) GEV Innsbruck | 3 |
| 4 | (Spain) CG Puigcerdà | 0 |

=== Group C ===
(Zagreb, SR Croatia, Yugoslavia)

| Team #1 | Score | Team #2 |
|---|---|---|
| SB Rosenheim (West Germany) | 3:3 | (East Germany) SG Dynamo Weißwasser |
| KHL Medveščak Zagreb (Socialist Federal Republic of Yugoslavia) | 12:0 | (Bulgaria) Levski-Spartak Sofia |
| SB Rosenheim (West Germany) | 18:1 | (Bulgaria) Levski-Spartak Sofia |
| KHL Medveščak Zagreb (Socialist Federal Republic of Yugoslavia) | 6:8 | (East Germany) SG Dynamo Weißwasser |
| SG Dynamo Weißwasser (East Germany) | 7:0 | (Bulgaria) Levski-Spartak Sofia |
| KHL Medveščak Zagreb (Socialist Federal Republic of Yugoslavia) | 6:10 | (West Germany) SB Rosenheim |

=== Group C standings ===
| Rank | Team | Points |
| 1 | (West Germany) SB Rosenheim | 5 |
| 2 | (East Germany) SG Dynamo Weißwasser | 5 |
| 3 | (Socialist Federal Republic of Yugoslavia) KHL Medveščak Zagreb | 2 |
| 4 | (Bulgaria) Levski-Spartak Sofia | 0 |

=== Group D ===
(Frederikshavn, Denmark)

| Team #1 | Score | Team #2 |
|---|---|---|
| Sparta Sarpsborg (Norway) | 10:5 | (Hungary) Ferencvárosi TC |
| Frederikshavn IK (Denmark) | 2:4 | (Romania) HC Steaua București |
| Frederikshavn IK (Denmark) | 6:6 | (Hungary) Ferencvárosi TC |
| Sparta Sarpsborg (Norway) | 4:2 | (Romania) HC Steaua București |
| Frederikshavn IK (Denmark) | 7:5 | (Norway) Sparta Sarpsborg |
| HC Steaua București (Romania) | 7:2 | (Hungary) Ferencvárosi TC |

=== Group D standings ===
| Rank | Team | Points |
| 1 | (Norway) Sparta Sarpsborg | 4 |
| 2 | (Romania) HC Steaua București | 4 |
| 3 | (Denmark) Frederikshavn IK | 3 |
| 4 | (Hungary) Ferencvárosi TC | 1 |

(Finland) TPS, (Sweden) Djurgårdens IF, (Czechoslovakia) Tesla Pardubice, (Soviet Union) CSKA Moscow : bye

== Second group round ==
=== Group A ===
(Bern, Canton of Bern, Switzerland)

| Team #1 | Score | Team #2 |
|---|---|---|
| SC Bern (Switzerland) | 3:2 | (Netherlands) Gunco Panda's Rotterdam |
| CSKA Moscow (Soviet Union) | 4:1 | (Finland) TPS |
| SC Bern (Switzerland) | 1:4 | (Finland) TPS |
| CSKA Moscow (Soviet Union) | 14:2 | (Netherlands) Gunco Panda's Rotterdam |
| SC Bern (Switzerland) | 5:13 | (Soviet Union) CSKA Moscow |
| TPS (Finland) | 7:3 | (Netherlands) Gunco Panda's Rotterdam |

=== Group A standings ===
| Rank | Team | Points |
| 1 | (Soviet Union) CSKA Moscow | 6 |
| 2 | (Finland) TPS | 4 |
| 3 | (Switzerland) SC Bern | 2 |
| 4 | (Netherlands) Gunco Panda's Rotterdam | 0 |

=== Group B ===
(Rosenheim, Bavaria, West Germany)

| Team #1 | Score | Team #2 |
|---|---|---|
| Djurgårdens IF (Sweden) | 10:0 | (Norway) Sparta Sarpsborg |
| SB Rosenheim (West Germany) | 5:4 | (Czechoslovakia) Tesla Pardubice |
| Djurgårdens IF (Sweden) | 5:1 | (Czechoslovakia) Tesla Pardubice |
| SB Rosenheim (West Germany) | 8:5 | (Norway) Sparta Sarpsborg |
| SB Rosenheim (West Germany) | 4:4 | (Sweden) Djurgårdens IF |
| Tesla Pardubice (Czechoslovakia) | 6:4 | (Norway) Sparta Sarpsborg |

=== Group B standings ===
| Rank | Team | Points |
| 1 | (Sweden) Djurgårdens IF | 5 |
| 2 | (West Germany) SB Rosenheim | 5 |
| 3 | (Czechoslovakia) Tesla Pardubice | 2 |
| 4 | (Norway) Sparta Sarpsborg | 0 |

== Final Group ==
(Berlin, West Germany)

| Team #1 | Score | Team #2 |
|---|---|---|
| CSKA Moscow (Soviet Union) | 5:1 | (Sweden) Djurgårdens IF |
| SB Rosenheim (West Germany) | 2:4 | (Finland) TPS |
| SB Rosenheim (West Germany) | 2:4 | (Sweden) Djurgårdens IF |
| CSKA Moscow (Soviet Union) | 4:2 | (Finland) TPS |
| SB Rosenheim (West Germany) | 0:6 | (Soviet Union) CSKA Moscow |
| TPS (Finland) | 4:3 | (Sweden) Djurgårdens IF |

=== Final group standings ===
| Rank | Team | Points |
| 1 | (Soviet Union) CSKA Moscow | 6 |
| 2 | (Finland) TPS | 4 |
| 3 | (Sweden) Djurgårdens IF | 2 |
| 4 | (West Germany) SB Rosenheim | 0 |
