= 1990–91 Eredivisie (ice hockey) season =

Dutch ice hockey season

The 1990–91 Eredivisie season was the 31st season of the Eredivisie, the top level of ice hockey in the Netherlands. Six teams participated in the league, and the Utrecht Rheem Racers won the championship.

== Regular season ==
	Club	GP	W	T	L	GF	GA	Pts (Bonus)
1.	Tilburg Trappers	10	7	1	2	50	37	19(4)
2.	Rotterdam Panda’s	10	6	1	3	61	33	19(6)
3.	Utrecht Rheem Racers	10	6	0	4	62	44	17(5)
4.	Eaters Geleen	10	5	1	4	53	45	14(3)
5.	Nijmegen Tigers	10	2	1	7	44	77	7(2)
6.	Amstel Tijgers Amsterdam	10	2	0	8	40	74	5(1)

== Playoffs ==
Semi-finals
Tilburg Trappers	2
Eaters Geleen	0
Rotterdam Panda’s	0
Utrecht Rheem Racers	2

Final
Tilburg Trappers	2
Utrecht Rheem Racers	3
Third place
not held
