= Doug Mason =

Canadian ice hockey player (born 1955)

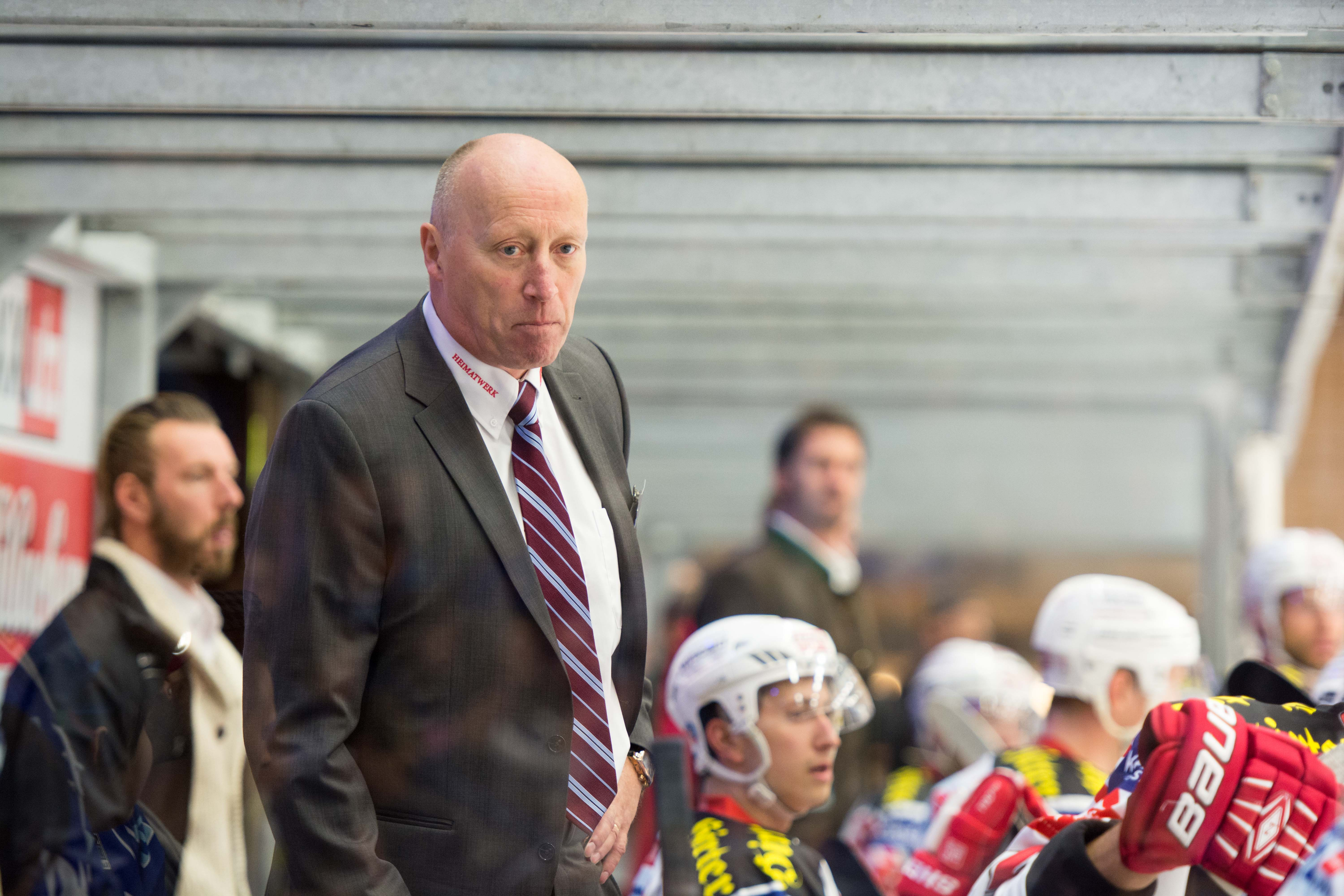
Doug Mason in 2014

Douglas Mason (born August 20, 1955) is a Canadian-Dutch professional ice hockey coach. He has been serving as head coach of the Graz 99ers in Austria since December 2016. His son Steve Mason is a professional ice hockey player.

== Playing career ==
Born in Sudbury, Ontario, Mason played in the SOJHL, OHA and IHL. Mason made his way to the Netherlands in 1979, signing with the Tilburg Trappers. He played for the team for the rest of his career, which ended in 1988.

== Coaching career ==
Mason’s coaching career began in 1989: In his first head coach role, he worked for Dutch team Langhout Utrecht for two years, guiding the club to winning the 1991 Eredivisie championship, and then would spend the 1991-92 season in the OHL, serving as assistant coach of the Sudbury Wolves.

After shorts stints in Switzerland (SC Lyss) and Italy (Asiago Hockey), Mason returned to the Tilburg Trappers in 1993 and spent four years at the helm of the club. Under his tutelage, the Trappers captured three straight Eredivisie championships.

Following a second stop in Switzerland at SC Luzern in 1997-98, saving the NLB side from relegation, he was named head coach of German top-tier club Augsburger Panther. The following season, 1998–99, he was hired by fellow Deutsche Eishockey Liga (DEL) side Krefeld Pinguine and worked as Krefeld head coach until 2001.

Mason took over head coaching duties at EV Zug of the Swiss top-flight NLA prior for the 2001-02 season and parted ways with the club in October 2002.

In 2003, he landed the head coach job with German DEL side Iserlohn Roosters and managed to drag the team away from the relegation zone his first year. He remained in Iserlohn until the end of the 2005-06 season and was named head coach of Kölner Haie in April 2006. Mason guided the Cologne-based team to the 2008 DEL finals, where the Haie squad fell short to Eisbären Berlin. Mason was relieved of his duties in September 2008 after seven consecutive losses.

He signed with Adler Mannheim for the 2009-10 season, but his brief reign was cut short after only half a season following a series of eight losses in nine games.

Mason signed with the Iserlohn Roosters in December 2010, returning for a second stint in charge at the club. In October 2013, he was sacked after a poor run of results.

In October 2014, Mason was appointed head coach of Austrian EBEL side Klagenfurter AC and guided the team to a semifinal appearance in his first year. He put pen to paper on a new two-year deal in April 2015, but parted ways with the club in December 2015.

On December 15, 2016, Mason was named head coach of the Graz 99ers to replace sacked Ivo Jan at the helm of the Austrian club. Starting in April 2018, he additionally took the job as head coach of the Dutch men's national team.

== National team ==
Mason served as head coach of the Dutch National Team from August 1993 to May 2000, coaching the squad at eleven World Championships.

In 2008, he joined the coaching staff of the Canadian National Team for the Deutschland Cup.
