= Ben Tijnagel =

Dutch ice hockey player

- Born: 12 June 1963 Nijmegen, Netherlands
- Died: 5 December 2005 (aged 42) Meerbusch, Germany
- Height: 185 cm (6 ft 1 in)
- Weight: 80 kg (176 lb; 12 st 8 lb)
- Position: Forward
- Played for: Nijmegen Tigers (1979-1986); Rotterdam Panda's (1986-1991); Nijmegen Tigers (1992-1998)
- Coached for: Nijmegen Tigers (2001-2002)
- National team: Netherlands

Ben "Bennie" Tijnagel (12 June 1964 – 5 December 2005) was a Dutch professional ice hockey player. He played a total of 18 seasons in the Eredivisie. He also competed for the Netherlands in the 1987 World Ice Hockey Championships.

== Biography ==
Born in Nijmegen, he joined hometown Nijmegen Tigers and played his first senior level first team hockey at age 16 in 1979. He had his career best offensive season in 1984-5 when he scored 104 points in just 39 games. In 1987, he joined Rotterdam Panda's, with whom he remained until 1992, when he rejoined Nijmegen as team captain. He was named Eredivisie MVP for 1979–80. After retiring after the 1997-98 season, he returned to the Tigers as an interim coach in 2001-2002.

Throughout his career, Tijangel played in 56 matches, scoring 20 goals and collecting 21 assists, for the Dutch national team. He played in 363 games over eleven seasons for the Tigers, scoring 322 goals and collecting 270 assists. In Rotterdam, he scored 260 goals and collected 160 assists.

On 5 December 2005, Tijnagel died in an auto accident on the Bundesautobahn 57 at Meerbusch.
