= Mari Saris =

Dutch ice hockey player

- Born: September 1, 1958 (age 66) 's-Hertogenbosch, Netherlands
- Position: Forward
- Played for: 's-Hertogenbosch Red Eagles; Rotterdam Panda's; Geleen Eaters; Kemphanen Eindhoven; Dordrecht Lions
- National team: Netherlands
- NHL draft: Undrafted
- Playing career: 1974–2011

Mari Saris (born September 1, 1958) in a former Dutch professional ice hockey player. He played 25 seasons for Nederlandse IJshockey Bond clubs and for the Nederlands at the 1981 World Ice Hockey Championships. He was born in 's-Hertogenbosch.

Saris began as 14-year-old with his hometown club 's-Hertogenbosch Red Eagles in 1974 and remained with the club until 1986. A forward, his best seasons offensively were 1983-4 when he scored 69 points in 43 games and 1985-6 went he got an impressive 68 points in just 26 games.

Mari played at the 1981 World Championships for the Netherlands in Pool A, the only time the country has appeared in the top tier in the tournament. He scored 2 goals and an assist in 7 games in the tournament. It was his only time to appear for the full national side.

After leaving 's-Hertogenbosch, Saris joined Rotterdam Pandas in 1986. In 1991, he joined Geleen Smoke Eaters where he remained for 3 seasons. Saris next joined Kemphanen Eindhoven and then in 1996 he rejoined 's-Hertogenbosch who now playing in the Eerste Divisie. He finished his playing career with a season with Dordrecht Lions.
