= Yves Héroux =

Canadian ice hockey player

- Born: April 27, 1965 (age 61) Terrebonne, Quebec, Canada
- Height: 5 ft 11 in (180 cm)
- Weight: 185 lb (84 kg; 13 st 3 lb)
- Position: Right wing
- Shot: Right
- Played for: Quebec Nordiques; HC Sierre; EHC Lustenau; Augsburger Panther; Schwenninger Wild Wings; EC Graz; Olimpija Ljubljana; Ayr Scottish Eagles
- National team: Canada
- NHL draft: 32nd overall, 1983; Quebec Nordiques
- Playing career: 1984–2000

Yves Héroux (born April 27, 1965) is a Canadian former professional ice hockey right winger who played in one game in the National Hockey League with the Quebec Nordiques during the 1986–87 season. The rest of his career, which lasted from 1984 to 2000, was mainly spent in the minor leagues.

== Career statistics ==
=== Regular season and playoffs ===
			Regular season					Playoffs
Season	Team	League	GP	G	A	Pts	PIM	GP	G	A	Pts	PIM
1982–83	Chicoutimi Saguenéens	QMJHL	70	41	40	81	44	5	0	4	4	8
1983–84	Chicoutimi Saguenéens	QMJHL	56	28	25	53	67	—	—	—	—	—
1983–84	Fredericton Express	AHL	4	0	0	0	0	—	—	—	—	—
1984–85	Chicoutimi Saguenéens	QMJHL	66	42	54	96	123	14	5	8	13	36
1985–86	Fredericton Express	AHL	31	12	10	22	42	2	0	1	1	7
1985–86	Muskegon Lumberjacks	IHL	42	14	8	22	41	—	—	—	—	—
1986–87	Quebec Nordiques	NHL	1	0	0	0	0	—	—	—	—	—
1986–87	Fredericton Express	AHL	37	8	6	14	13	—	—	—	—	—
1986–87	Muskegon Lumberjacks	IHL	25	6	8	14	31	2	0	0	0	0
1987–88	Baltimore Skipjacks	AHL	5	0	2	2	2	—	—	—	—	—
1987–88	HC Sierre	NLA	1	0	0	0	2	—	—	—	—	—
1988–89	Flint Spirits	IHL	82	43	42	85	98	—	—	—	—	—
1989–90	Canadian National Team	Intl	65	13	24	37	63	—	—	—	—	—
1989–90	Peoria Rivermen	IHL	14	3	2	5	4	5	2	2	4	0
1990–91	Albany Choppers	IHL	45	22	18	40	46	—	—	—	—	—
1990–91	Peoria Rivermen	IHL	33	16	8	24	26	17	4	4	8	16
1991–92	Peoria Rivermen	IHL	80	41	36	77	72	8	5	1	6	6
1992–93	Kalamazoo Wings	IHL	80	38	30	68	86	—	—	—	—	—
1993–94	Kalamazoo Wings	IHL	3	0	2	2	4	—	—	—	—	—
1993–94	Indianapolis Ice	IHL	74	28	30	58	113	—	—	—	—	—
1994–95	Atlanta Knights	IHL	66	31	24	55	56	5	2	3	5	6
1994–95	Worcester IceCats	AHL	7	3	1	4	2	—	—	—	—	—
1995–96	EHC Lustenau	AUT	33	23	31	54	62	—	—	—	—	—
1996–97	Augsburger Panther	DEL	20	4	9	13	30	—	—	—	—	—
1996–97	Schwenninger Wild Wings	DEL	27	11	17	28	34	—	—	—	—	—
1997–98	Schwenninger Wild Wings	DEL	50	14	12	26	147	—	—	—	—	—
1998–99	Olimpija Ljubljana	SLV	12	7	10	17	56	—	—	—	—	—
1999–00	Ayr Scottish Eagles	BISL	42	18	25	43	92	7	0	0	0	14
IHL totals			543	242	208	450	577	37	13	10	23	28
NHL totals			1	0	0	0	0	—	—	—	—	—

== See also ==
- List of players who played only one game in the NHL
