= Joe Simons =

Dutch ice hockey player

- Born: 15 July 1947 (age 79) Tilburg, Netherlands
- Height: 172 cm (5 ft 8 in)
- Weight: 78 kg (172 lb; 12 st 4 lb)
- Position: Forward
- Played for: TYSC Trappers (1964-75, 1979-80)
- National team: Netherlands

Joe Simons (born 15 July 1947, Tilburg) is a Dutch former ice hockey player. He spent his career with the TYSC Trappers hockey club, where, as of 2011, he was the all-time leader in points. Simons was born in Tilburg, Netherlands and emigrated to Canada in the 1980s with his family.

Simons played with the TYSC Trappers from the 1964 through to the 1974–75 season and again for the 1979/1980 season. During his time there, the team won six consecutive national titles and he served as team captain. He played 441 games and had 743 goals and 405 assists with a total of 1148 points. He also had 763 penalty minutes. His number, 10, was later retired by the club. Simons also played more than 70 games on the Dutch national ice hockey team.

As of 2018, Simons lives in both Tilburg and Vancouver Island.
