= Albany Choppers =

American pro ice hockey team (1990–91)

- City: Albany, New York
- League: IHL
- Division: East Division
- Founded: 1990
- Operated: 1990–91 (folded mid-season, February 1991)
- Home arena: Knickerbocker Arena
- Colors: Blue, red and white
- Owner: David Welker
- General manager: Jim Salfi
- Head coach: Dave Allison
- Captain: Dale Henry
- Affiliates: Independent

Franchise history
- 1990–91: Albany Choppers

Championships
- Regular season titles: None
- Division titles: None
- Conference titles: None
- Turner Cups: None

The Albany Choppers were an independent professional ice hockey team in Albany, New York, which existed for the first 55 games (of 82) in the 1990–91 season of the International Hockey League.

== Creation ==
The Fort Wayne Komets had been mainstays of the IHL for four decades. Before the 1990–91 season, its owner, gravel magnate David Welker, opted to move his franchise to Albany. The city had recently built Knickerbocker Arena, which was built to National Hockey League standards of the time. They represented the IHL's first effort in years to push beyond its traditional heartland in the Great Lakes; they were the easternmost team in the IHL since the Johnstown Jets left the league in 1955. The Schenectady-based Price Chopper supermarket chain bought in as a minority partner—hence the name and colors of red, white and blue, which matched Price Chopper's corporate hues.

Among players for the Choppers were goaltenders Rick Knickle, former St. Louis Blue Bruce Racine and former Boston Bruin John Blue; former New York Islander and team captain Dale Henry, former Minnesota North Star Dave Richter, and Mario Lemieux's brother, center Alain Lemieux, who was the team's leading scorer until he was traded for cash. A large number of players were ex-Springfield Indians, including Henry, Lemieux, forwards Stu Burnie, Bob Bodak and Jim McGeough, and defensemen Vern Smith and Manny Vivieros. Dave Allison served as the team's head coach. Ken Morrow was to serve as the team's general manager, but he changed his mind and turned down the position, which was filled by Jim Salfi.

== Early struggles ==
Pro hockey teams in the Capital District (1990–91)
1 Adirondack Red Wings
2 Capital District Islanders
3 Albany Choppers

The team began play in the 1990–91 season, but ran into several major roadblocks. By this time, the IHL had firmly established itself as a top-level feeder league for the NHL. The entrenched American Hockey League was unnerved by the IHL's expansion into its traditional stronghold in the Northeast, and hastily planted a team just across the Hudson River in neighboring Troy, the Capital District Islanders. Moreover, the three-time Calder Cup champion Adirondack Red Wings were less than fifty miles (80 km) north in Glens Falls. Never in recent history had so many minor-league teams been crammed into such a small market. It did not help matters that the perennial college hockey powerhouse RPI Engineers also played in Troy. All three pro teams suffered at the gate through the subsequent price wars (although RPI benefited from having the Capital District Islanders as a tenant).

However, the Choppers suffered the most. Not only were they essentially an expansion team, but they also had to foot the travel expenses for six IHL teams as a condition of being allowed to move to Albany. They were unable to secure a full NHL affiliation (and its subsidized salaries); they had to settle for a secondary affiliation with the Vancouver Canucks. They only had 11 players with NHL contracts.

The team sank into last place, and attendance plummeted; for numerous games attendance in the cavernous 'Knick' (capacity 15,000) was no more than a few hundred fans. After local media reported attendance figures at odds with the ones management was reporting (by quite literally counting heads), the team ceased to report attendance altogether, while giving season tickets away outright.

== The end ==
As it was, the team hemorrhaged funds, held back by the most expensive travel budget in the IHL and a lack of natural rivalries. Their nearest opponent was the new Komets (Welker's franchise had been replaced by the relocated Flint Spirits team, which took the Komets' name and history), some 670 miles (1,080 km) west. The team eventually struggled to meet payroll, missing it several times, and supplies ran short. One notorious incident came during an overtime game against the Komets, when Jim McGeough was sent out for the final shot in a shootout because he had the only sound hockey stick remaining on the bench.

By December, the Choppers were gasping. Their assets had been frozen when a travel agency sued them for non-payment, and they lost their radio flagship due to three months of unpaid bills. Out of desperation, Allison put all of the players who did not have NHL contracts on waivers. The Milwaukee Admirals claimed Henry, forcing the Choppers to trade Lemieux to the Admirals to get Henry back. However, it was understood that Lemieux would return to Albany if Welker found a buyer for the team.

The end came in February, when Price Chopper announced it was pulling its sponsorship and its investment after the season, citing a poor relationship with Welker and lackluster promotion. By February 14, the Choppers were so short of cash that they were not only about to miss payroll again, but lacked enough money for their next road trip. Even though they had won six of their last nine games and were in contention for a playoff berth, no credible buyers were on the horizon. Welker finally gave up and shuttered the team that night. The Capital District Islanders promptly honored all Choppers season tickets in an attempt to boost their own attendance. Somewhat ironically, Henry, Knickle and Vivieros finished the season back in Springfield, where they helped the Indians to their final Calder Cup championship, while leading goal scorer Yves Héroux would move to the Peoria Rivermen and prove key in their own Turner Cup championship in that same season against the Komets, the team with whom Burnie signed. Lemieux, Burnie and Richter retired after the season. Defenseman Scott Drevitch was the final Chopper active in professional hockey, playing for the Elmira Jackals of the United Hockey League in the 2006–2007 season.

=== Former radio affiliate (1 station) ===
- WPTR/1540: Albany
