= 1986–87 Eredivisie (ice hockey) season =

Dutch ice hockey season

The 1986–87 Eredivisie season was the 27th season of the Eredivisie, the top level of ice hockey in the Netherlands. Six teams participated in the league, and the Rotterdam Panda's won the championship.

== Regular season ==
	Club	GP	W	T	L	GF	GA	Pts (Bonus)
1.	Rotterdam Panda’s	10	9	0	1	69	33	24(6)
2.	Eaters Geleen	10	6	2	2	56	47	19(5)
3.	Amstel Tijgers Amsterdam	10	6	0	4	56	57	12(4)
4.	G.IJ.S. Groningen	10	4	2	4	52	54	12(2)
5.	Nijmegen Tigers	10	3	2	5	48	59	9(1)
6.	Tilburg Trappers	10	0	2	8	35	66	5(3)

== Playoffs ==
Semi-finals
Rotterdam Panda’s	2
G.IJ.S. Groningen	0
Eaters Geleen	2
Amstel Tijgers Amsterdam	1

Final
Rotterdam Panda’s	2
Eaters Geleen	0
Third place
not held
