= Thomas Cijan =

Austrian ice hockey player

Personal information
- Nationality: Austrian
- Born: 29 December 1960 (age 65) Klagenfurt, Austria

Sport
- Sport: Ice hockey

Thomas Cijan (born 29 December 1960) is an Austrian ice hockey player. He competed in the men's tournaments at the 1984 Winter Olympics and the 1988 Winter Olympics.
