= Fred Homburg =

Dutch ice hockey player

- Born: February 4, 1962 (age 63); Nijmegen, NED
- Position: Defence
- Played for: Nijmegen Tigers
- National team: Netherlands
- Playing career: 1978–2000

Fred Homburg (born February 4, 1962) is a former Dutch professional ice hockey defenceman.

Homburg spent his entire pro career with his hometown Nijmegen Tigers. He joined the senior first team of Nijmegen in 1978 as a 16-year-old and remained with the club to 2000.

== International ==
He competed as a member of the Netherlands men's national ice hockey team at the 1981 World Ice Hockey Championships.

== Sources ==
- Biographical information and career statistics from Eliteprospects.com
