= Ice Hockey Federation of Yugoslavia =

Ice hockey governing body

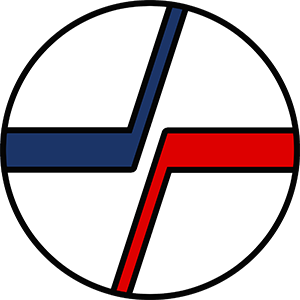
- Founded: 1935/1949
- Headquarters: Ljubljana
- Replaced: Ice Hockey department of Winter Sports Federation

The Ice Hockey Federation of Yugoslavia (Serbo-Croatian: Savez hokeja na ledu Jugoslavije, Slovene: Hokejska Zveza Jugoslavije) was the governing body of ice hockey in Yugoslavia.

== History ==
In 1911, the Kingdom of Serbia joined the IIHF at the fourth LIHG Congress in Berlin. After World War I and the formation of Yugoslavia Winter Sports Federation of Yugoslavia was formed in Ljubljana with its ice hockey department. Yugoslav Skating Federation (Jugoslavenski klizački savez) was then formed in Zagreb in 1935 and joined the LIHG in 1939. After World War II, the Skating and Ice Hockey Federation of Yugoslavia was formed in 1949. It was transformed to Ice and Roller Skating Federation in 1956 and finally split to Skating Federation and Ice Hockey Federation in 1974. It was dissolved with the breakup of Yugoslavia.

Since 1939 and until 1991, it organized the Yugoslav Ice Hockey League.

== Successor federations ==
- Ice Hockey Federation of Slovenia
- Croatian Ice Hockey Federation
- Serbian Ice Hockey Association
- Bosnia and Herzegovina Ice Hockey Federation
- Macedonian Ice Hockey Federation
