= 1991–92 Eredivisie (ice hockey) season =

Dutch ice hockey season

The 1991–92 Eredivisie season was the 32nd season of the Eredivisie, the top level of ice hockey in the Netherlands. Six teams participated in the league, and the Utrecht Rheem Racers won the championship.

== Regular season ==
	Club	GP	W	T	L	GF	GA	Pts
1.	Tilburg Trappers	30	18	4	8	185	124	40
2.	Utrecht Rheem Racers	30	18	1	11	147	115	37
3.	Rotterdam Panda’s	30	16	4	10	155	123	36
4.	Eaters Geleen	30	16	4	10	152	116	36
5.	Heerenveen Flyers	30	7	3	20	141	210	17
6.	Nijmegen Tigers	30	6	2	22	120	212	14

== Playoffs ==
Semi-finals
Utrecht Rheem Racers	3
Rotterdam Panda’s	0
Tilburg Trappers	1
Eaters Geleen	3

Final
Utrecht Rheem Racers	3
Eaters Geleen	1
Third place
not held
