= 1992–93 Eredivisie (ice hockey) season =

Dutch ice hockey season

The 1992–93 Eredivisie season was the 33rd season of the Eredivisie, the top level of ice hockey in the Netherlands. Four teams participated in the league, and the Nijmegen Tigers won the championship.

== Regular season ==
	Club	GP	W	T	L	GF	GA	Pts (Bonus)
1.	Eaters Geleen	6	3	2	1	22	17	12(4)
2.	Nijmegen Tigers	6	3	1	2	27	24	10(3)
3.	Rotterdam Panda’s	6	2	1	3	18	22	7(2)
4.	Tilburg Trappers	6	1	2	3	14	18	5(1)

== Playoffs ==
Semi-finals
Eaters Geleen	4
Tilburg Trappers	1
Nijmegen Tigers	4
Rotterdam Panda’s	1

Final
Eaters Geleen	2
Nijmegen Tigers	4
Third place
not played
