= Rotterdam Pandas =

Ice hockey team

- Founded: 1986
- Dissolved: 1992
- Based in: Rotterdam, Netherlands
- Home ground: Weena-ijshal
- Colors: Green, white, black
- Championships: 1987, 1989, 1990

Rotterdam Pandas was a professional ice hockey team in Rotterdam, Netherlands. They played in the Dutch Eredivisie, the highest-level hockey division in the Netherlands. Home games were played at the Weena-ijshal, a (now-closed) arena near Rotterdam Central train station.

== History ==
Ice hockey had been played in Rotterdam since the 1950s. The Rotterdam Panda's team played six seasons in the Eredivisie, winning its first national championship during its first season. It attracted several players from other teams in the Eredivisie, especially Nijmegen.

The team sported a green and white jersey with the logo of the World Wildlife Fund panda as a crest.

Securing a home arena was a major problem for the Panda's. The Weena-ijshal shut its doors in 1993. Since then, there has been no commitment to build a new ice hockey arena in Rotterdam, despite discussions as lately as 2007.

== Season results ==
Note: GP = Games played, W = Wins, T = Ties, L = Losses, GF = Goals for, GA = Goals against, Pts = Points

Season	GP	W	T	L	GF	GA	Pts	Finish	Playoffs
1991-92	30	16	4	10	155	123	36	3rd, Eredivisie	Lost semi-final to Utrecht (0-3)
1990-91	10	6	1	3	61	33	19	2nd, Eredivisie	Lost semi-final to Utrecht (0-2)
1989-90	10	9	1	0	67	31	25	1st, Eredivisie	Won National Championship (3-0 vs Nijmegen)
1988-89	28	20	1	7	212	93	41	2nd, Eredivisie	Won National Championship (3-2 vs Geleen)
1987-88	10	4	1	5	45	51	13	4th, Eredivisie	Lost semi-final to Nijmegen (0-2)
1986-87	10	9	0	1	69	33	24	1st, Eredivisie	Won National Championship (2-0 vs Geleen)

== Notable players ==
- Ron Berteling
- Henk Hille
- Mari Saris
- Alexander Schaafsma
- Sean Simpson
- Ben Tijnagel
- Harrie van Heumen
- Bill Wensink

== Championships ==
Dutch National Championship

3 times: 1986–87; 1988–89; 1989–90
