= Nijmegen Tigers =

Dutch ice hockey club

- Founded: c. 1967
- Team history: Nijmegen Tigers (1967–2003)
- Based in: Nijmegen
- Location: Netherlands
- Arena: local icerink in Heyendaal (1967–1996); Triavium (1997–2003)
- Colours: Black, yellow, blue, white & red
- Head coach: Alex Andjelic (early 1970s–1985); Danny Cuomo (1987–90, 1992–97); Andy Tenbult (1990–91); Fred Homburg (1991–92); Jaro Mucha (1997–98); Henri Stoer (1998–99); Harrie van Heumen (1999–2001); Paul Strople (2001); Ben Tijnagel (2001–02); Dana Knowlton (2002–03); Jason Clark (2003)
- Championships: 1983–84, 1987–88, 1992–93, 1996–97, 1997–98, 1998–99, 1999–2000

Nijmegen Tigers was a Dutch ice hockey club based in Nijmegen until 2003, when it was forced into bankruptcy. It has been succeeded by the Nijmegen Devils.

The Tigers won the Eredivisie playoffs during the 1987–88 Eredivisie season. They were led offensively by Robert Forbes with 122 points, and Jim Aldred with 88 points, which were the first and ninth best totals in the league respectively. The Tigers placed second in the league cup, placed first in the playoffs round-robin, then defeated the Rotterdam Pandas in five games in the semifinals, and defeated the Heerenveen Flyers in four games to win the playoffs championship.

== Sources ==
- nijmegen-legends.com with a history of ice hockey in Nijmegen
