= Tilburg Trappers =

Dutch ice hockey club

- Division: Oberliga Nord
- Founded: 1938
- Home arena: IJssportcentrum Tilburg (capacity 2,500)
- City: Tilburg, North Brabant
- Team colors: Blue, yellow, white
- Media: I13
- Head coach: Todd Warriner
- Captain: Max Hermens
- Minor league affiliates: Tilburg Trappers Toekomstteam (Eredivision) Championships Oberliga: 3 (2015-16, 2016-17, 2017-18) Dutch: 15 Dutch cups: 15
- Official website: www.trappers.nl

The Tilburg Trappers are a professional ice hockey club based in Tilburg, the Netherlands. They previously played in the highest level ice hockey league in the country, but have been playing in the German Oberliga Nord since the 2015–16 season. Founded on 21 October 1938, they were officially recognised by the National Federation on 18 January 1939. The Trappers were crowned Eredivisie champions for the first time in the 1946–47 season, adding another 14 National Dutch Championships, 15 Dutch National Cups and 3 German Oberliga Championships over the years.

The club has an amateur branch, which is a separate legal entity and plays in the highest Dutch league (Eredivsie). The Trappers play their home games in the Stappegoor IJssportcentrum Tilburg.

== Season results ==
Note: GP = Games played, W = Wins, OTW = Overtime Wins, OTL = Overtime Losses, L = Losses, GF = Goals for, GA = Goals against, Pts = Points

Season	GP	W	OTW	OTL	L	Pts	GF	GA	Finish	Playoffs
2005/06	20	7	1	2	10	70	64	25	6th, Eredivisie	Did not qualify
2006/07	20	12	1	2	5	88	55	40	2nd, Eredivisie	Won National Championship against Vadeko Flyers Heerenveen (3–0)
2007/08	24	20	1	0	3	132	58	62	1st, Eredivisie	Won National Championship against Vadeko Flyers Heerenveen (3–1)
2008/09	24	18	1	0	5	142	78	56	1st, Eredivisie	Lost finals to The Hague (2–3)
2009/10	28	17	1	2	8	135	86	55	3rd, Eredivisie	Lost finals to Nijmegen(0–3)
2010/11	28	19	0	1	8	120	70	58	2nd, North Sea Cup	Lost finals to HYS The Hague(1–4)
2011/12	14	11	0	0	3	80	36	33	3rd, North Sea Cup	Lost semi-finals to Geleen (0–3)
2012/13	36	25	2	3	6	82	198	93	2nd, Eredivisie	Lost Finals to HYS The Hague (0W-3L)
2013/14	36	30	2	4	4	64	216	64	1st, Eredivisie	Won Dutch Championship against HYS The Hague (4–2)
2014/15	24	17	2	0	5	38	126	53	2nd, Eredivisie	Won Dutch Championship against UNIS Flyers Heerenveen (5–2)
2015/16	57	40	3	1	11	130	284	119	2nd, Oberliga Nord	Won Oberliga Championship against EHC Bayreuth (3–0)
2016/17	60	42	1	3	14	131	263	145	4th, Oberliga Nord	Won Oberliga Championship against Tölzer Löwen (3–1)
2017/18	59	43	8	3	5	110	265	129	1st, Oberliga Nord	Won Oberliga Championship against Deggendorfer SC (3–1)
2018/19	65	44	6	5	10	150	323	174	1st, Oberliga Nord	Lost Oberliga Championship Finals against EV Landshut (2–3)
2019/20	44	31	6	6	1	106	210	117	1st, Oberliga Nord	Season ended before the play-offs due to COVID-19
2020/21	41	27	3	1	10	97	200	114	2nd, Oberliga Nord	Lost in Oberliga North playoffs (1–2)
2021/22	48	29	5	5	9	102	209	107	3rd, Oberliga Nord	Lost in quarter finals against ECDC Memmingen (0–3)
2022/23	56	40	1	2	13	124	251	144	3rd, Oberliga Nord	Lost in quarter finals against Starbulls Rosenheim (1–3)
2023/24	44	26	5	1	12	89	174	127	2nd, Oberliga Nord	Lost in semi-finals against Blue Devils Weiden (1–4)
2024/25	42	27	5	3	7	94	219	133	1st, Oberliga Nord	

== Players ==
=== 2024/25 ===
Goalies
Nr.		Name	Birthdate	Birthplace	Height	L/R	Trapper since season	Last team
33	Flag of the Netherlands	Ruud Leeuwesteijn	January 3, 1997	Dordrecht, Netherlands	187 cm	L	2015/16	Eindhoven Kemphanen/NIJA
67	Flag of the Netherlands Flag of Canada	Cederick Andree	June 7, 2000	Ottawa, Canada	179 cm	L	2023/34	South Carolina Stingrays
Defenders
Nr.		Name	Birthdate	Birthplace	Height	L/R	Trapper since season	Last team
5	Flag of the Netherlands	Giovanni Vogelaar	August 6, 1996	Den Haag, Netherlands	189 cm	R	2015/16	Heerenveen Flyers
7	Flag of the Netherlands Flag of Russia	Alexey Loginov	January 8, 1993	Saratov, Russia	178 cm	L	2016/17	Zauralie Kurgan, Kurgan Oblast, Russia
13	Flag of the Netherlands	Jordy Verkiel	December 23, 1996	Dordrecht, Netherlands	183 cm	R	2010/11	
16	Flag of the Netherlands	Kilian van Gorp	December 17, 1995	Udenhout, Netherlands	191 cm	L	2014/15	Eindhoven Kemphanen
20	Flag of the Netherlands	Noah Muller	November 4, 1998	Amsterdam, Netherlands	176 cm	L	2020/21	St. Michael's College
43	Flag of the Netherlands	Björn Borgman	Mai 28, 2002	Purmerend, Netherlands	166 cm	L	2023/24	Hijs Hokij Den Haag
48	Flag of the Netherlands	Chay Schults	January 14, 2003	Tilburg, Netherlands	180 cm	R	2022/23	
89	Flag of the Netherlands	Mike Dalhuisen	January 24, 1989	Nijmegen, Netherlands	188 cm	L	2024/25	Sydney Ice Dogs
Forwards
Nr.		Name	Birthdate	Birthplace	Height	L/R	Trapper since season	Last team
4	Flag of the Netherlands	Tiest van Soest	Mai 13, 2000	Son en Breugel, Netherlands	194 cm	R	2020/21	South Shore Kings
11	Flag of the United States	Kobe Roth	January 11, 1997	Mason City, IA, USA	175 cm	L	2024/25	Coventry Blaze
26	Flag of the Netherlands	Jonne de Bonth	April 23, 1998	Tilburg, Netherlands	185 cm	L	2015/16	
28	Flag of the Netherlands	Delaney Hessels	September 10, 2001	Goirle, Netherlands	170 cm	L	2018/19	
29	Flag of the Netherlands Flag of Canada	D'artagnan Joly	April 7, 1999	Gatineau, Canada	191 cm	R	2023/24	Black Dragons Erfurt
36	Flag of the Netherlands	Marvin Timmer	April 27, 2003	's-Hertogenbosch, Netherlands	179 cm	R	2019/20	
41	Flag of the Netherlands	Jay Huisman	Mai 1, 2002	Zoetermeer, Netherlands	188 cm	L	2023/24	HIJS HOKIJ Den Haag
59	Flag of the Netherlands	Jari Versantvoort	Februari 6, 2007		177 cm	R	2024/25	
68	Flag of the Netherlands	Donny van Belkom	Oktober 21, 2007	Tilburg, Netherlands	178 cm	L	2024/25	
71	Flag of Canada Flag of Italy	Anthony Rinaldi	August 17, 1995	Pierrefonds, QC, Canada	183 cm	R	2024/25	Dundee Stars
77	Flag of the Netherlands	Reno de Hondt	Oktober 6, 1995	Tilburg, Netherlands	168 cm	R	2014/15	Flint Jr. Generals - Flint, Michigan, USA
81	Flag of the Netherlands	Max Hermens	Oktober 31, 1997	Zoetermeer, Netherlands	180 cm	L	2017/18	Nacka HK, Swede
82	Flag of the Netherlands	Justin van der Ven	August 6, 2002	Goirle, Netherlands	179 cm	L	2024/25	Lausitzer Füchse
86	Flag of Canada	Phil Marinaccio	April 14, 1993	Woodbridge, Canada	178 cm	L	2024/25	Västerviks IK
95	Flag of the Netherlands	Danny Stempher	August 5, 1995	Zoetermeer, Netherlands	178 cm	L	2015/16	Eindhoven Kemphanen

== Staff ==
=== 2024/25 ===
Coaching/Team Staff

- Todd Warriner, Head Coach
- Dennis ten Bokkel, Assistant Coach

Medical Staff

- Marcel van Putten, medical doctor
- Marcel Rouwenhorst, medical doctor
- Thom van Uden, Physiotherapeut
- Roland Jansen, Physiotherapeut
- Berrie Aarts, Kit Manager
- Emille van Hulten, Kit Manager
- Ton van Bommel, Kit Manager

Sport Management

- Stef van Dijk, Teammanagement/Kit manager

== Transfers ==
=== 2024/25 ===
In:

- Phil Marinaccio - Västerviks IK
- Mike Dalhuisen - Sydney Ice Dogs
- Justin van der Ven - Lausitzer Füchse
- Kobe Roth - Coventry Blaze
- Anthony Rinaldi - Dundee Stars

Out:

- Doug Mason - Stopped
- Diego Hofland - Stopped
- Mikko Virtanen - Unknown
- Ninho Hessels - Eaters Geleen
- Wouter Sars - Eaters Geleen
- Tijn Jacobs - Eaters Geleen
- Branden Gracel - Forced to stop

== Former coaches ==
- Bohuslav Subr
- Larry Suarez 16.02.1964 USA
- Doug Mason
- Marc Boileau
- Fred Shero
- Paul Gardner
- Lou Vairo

== Championships and Cup Wins ==
- German Oberliga Championship (2016, 2017, 2018)
- Dutch national Championship (1948, 1971, 1972, 1973, 1974, 1975, 1976, 1994, 1995, 1996, 2001, 2007, 2008, 2013, 2014, 2015)
- Cup Nationale Nederlanden (1971, 1972, 1973, 1974, 1975, 1976, 1996, 1998, 1999, 2002, 2003, 2004, 2008, 2010, 2011, 2013, 2014, 2015)
- Dutch Super Cup, Ron Bertelingschaal (2008, 2009, 2012, 2014, 2015)

== Retired numbers ==
Tilburg Trappers retired numbers
No.	Player	Position	Career	Birthdate	Games	Points
2	Huub van Dun	D	1965–1977	January 9, 1949	438	169
8	John MacDonald	F	1964-1981	June 6, 1947	600	1007
9	George Peternousek	D	1968–1981	March 11, 1947	521	1081
10	Joe Simons	F	1964–1980	July 15, 1947	441	1148
15	Klaas van den Broek	F	1969–1985	July 7, 1955	630	787
17	Frank Jacobs	D	1984–1998	June 14, 1967	632	230
18	Rody Jacobs	D	1995–2013	June 29, 1967	894	313
19	Peter van Biezen	F	2000–2017	March 1, 1983	836	836
25	Bjorn WIllemse	D	2001-2017	December 11, 1983	727	448
30	Jerry Göbel	GK	1970–1980	February 19, 1949	428	2
31	Martin Trommelen	GK	1986–2007	September 18, 1969	954	18
39	Ian Meierdres	GK	2007-2022	December 24, 1988	840	17

== Prize winning players ==
- Jack de Heer Trofee: Topscorer (since season 1999–2000)

Raphael Joly (2012–2013), Daryl Bat (2009–2010), Taggert Desmet (2008–2009), Mike Lalonde (2007–2008), Dave Bonk (2006–2007), Jeffrey Maed (1999–2000)

- Wil van Dommelen Trofee: Best defender (since season 1999–2000)

Jordy van Oorschot (2014–2015), Wil Colbert (2013–2014), Stanislav Nazarov (2003–2004), Leo van den Thillart (2002–2003), Don Nichols (2000–2001)

- Frans Henrichs Bokaal: Most Valuable Dutch Player (since 1987)

Diederick Hagemeijer (2011–2012), Peter van Biezen (2010–2011), Doug Stienstra (2007–2008), Doug Stienstra (2006–2007), Rody Jacobs (2000–2001), Theo van Gerwen (1995–1996), Antoine Geesink (1994–1995), Dave Livingston (1993–1994)

- Göbel - de Bruyn Trofee: Best goalie (since season 1999–2000)

Ian Meierdres (2012–2013), Ian Meierdres (2010–2011), Paulo Colaiacovo (2007–2008), Martin Trommelen (2003–2004)

- Bennie Tijnagel-Trofee: Dutch talent in the Eredivisie (since 2005)

Jay Huisman (2022–2023), Wouter Sars (2017–2018), Jordy Verkiel (2014–2015), Ivy van den Heuvel (2010–2011)

== Famous players ==
- Klaas van den Broek
- Huub van Dun
- Leo Van den Thillart
- Paulo Colaiacovo
- Jerry Göbel
- Frank Jacobs
- John MacDonald
- Jiri Petrnousek
- Jack de Heer
- Joe Simons
- Sean Simpson
- Hans Smolders
- Billy Thompson
- Martin Trommelen
- Dale Weise
