= Belgian National League =

- Sport: Ice hockey
- Founded: 1975
- No. of teams: 8
- Country: Belgium
- Most recent champion: IHC Leuven

The Belgian National League was the second level of ice hockey in Belgium. The league was one rank below the Belgian Hockey League, but for the 2012-2013 season it was merged with two teams of the defunct North Sea Cup to become the "Belgian Elite League", which is now Belgium's top level league.

== Participating teams ==
- Antwerp Phantoms
- Bulldogs Liège
- Charleroi Red Roosters
- Gullegem Jets
- Haskey Hasselt
- HYC Herentals
- IHC Leuven
- Olympia Heist op den Berg
- White Caps Turnhout
- Yeti Bears Eeklo
