= 1997–98 Belgian Hockey League season =

The 1997–98 Belgian Hockey League season was the 78th season of the Belgian Hockey League, the top level of ice hockey in Belgium. Eight teams participated in the league, and HYC Herentals won the championship.

== Regular season ==
	Club	GP	W	T	L	GF	GA	Pts
1.	HYC Herentals	28	27	0	1	392	92	54
2.	IHC Leuven	28	19	1	8	236	98	39
3.	Griffoens Geel	28	18	1	9	233	142	37
4.	Olympia Heist op den Berg	28	16	2	10	245	192	32*
5.	Yeti Bears Eeklo	28	12	2	14	209	253	26
6.	Brussels Royal IHSC	28	8	1	19	140	253	17
7.	Phantoms Deurne II	28	5	1	22	106	257	11
8.	White Caps Turnhout	28	3	0	25	66	340	6

- (* Olympia Heist op den Berg had two points deducted)

== Playoffs ==
=== Semifinals ===
- IHC Leuven - Griffoens Geel 3:4/5:4
- Olympia Heist op den Berg - HYC Herentals 5:8/3:10

=== 3rd place ===
- Griffoens Geel - Olympia Heist op den Berg 10:7/4:9

=== Final ===
- IHC Leuven - HYC Herentals 2:13/1:8

== Federation Cup (5th place) ==
=== Semifinals ===
- Phantoms Deurne II - Brussels Royal IHSC 6:0/13:1
- Yeti Bears Eeklo - White Caps Turnhout 10:6/11:5

=== 7th place ===
- White Caps Turnhout - Brussels Royal IHSC 16:5/10:0

=== 5th place ===
- Yeti Bears Eeklo - Phantoms Deurne II 6:4/7:6
