= 1999–2000 Belgian Hockey League season =

The 1999–2000 Belgian Hockey League season was the 80th season of the Belgian Hockey League, the top level of ice hockey in Belgium. Seven teams participated in the league, and Phantoms Deurne won the championship.

== Regular season ==
	Club	GP	W	T	L	GF	GA	Pts
1.	IHC Leuven	12	9	1	2	83	38	28
2.	HYC Herentals	12	9	0	3	89	30	27
3.	Phantoms Deurne	12	8	1	3	72	49	25
4.	Griffoens Geel	12	6	0	6	83	66	18
5.	Olympia Heist op den Berg	12	6	0	6	74	58	18
6.	Yeti Bears Eeklo	12	3	0	9	49	115	9
7.	White Caps Turnhout	12	0	0	12	20	114	0

== Playoffs ==
=== Semifinals ===
- Phantoms Deurne - HYC Herentals 5:4/3:1
- IHC Leuven - Griffoens Geel 7:1/8:5

=== 3rd place ===
- Griffoens Geel - HYC Herentals 3:8/2:9

=== Final ===
- Phantoms Deurne - IHC Leuven 9:7/5:6
