= 2013–14 Belgian Hockey League season =

The 2013–14 Belgian Hockey League season was the 94th season of the Belgian Hockey League, the top level of ice hockey in Belgium. Seven teams participated in the league, and the Bulldogs Liège won the championship.

== Regular season ==
	Club	GP	W	OTW	OTL	L	GF	GA	Pts
1.	White Caps Turnhout	18	15	0	0	3	136	53	45
2.	Bulldogs Liège	18	13	0	0	5	113	61	39
3.	Antwerp Phantoms	18	11	1	0	6	116	53	35
4.	Chiefs Leuven	18	10	0	1	7	84	58	31
5.	Haskey Hasselt	18	6	1	0	11	78	96	20
6.	Olympia Heist op den Berg	18	3	0	2	13	33	114	11
7.	HYC Herentals II	18	2	1	0	15	32	156	8

== Playoffs ==
Semifinals
1	White Caps Turnhout	2
4	Chiefs Leuven	1
3	Bulldogs Liège	2
2	Antwerp Phantoms	1

Final
White Caps Turnhout	0
Bulldogs Liège	3
