= 2012–13 Belgian Hockey League season =

The 2012–13 Belgian Hockey League season was the 93rd season of the Belgian Hockey League, the top level of ice hockey in Belgium. 10 teams participated in the league, and the Chiefs Leuven won the championship.

== Regular season ==
	Club	GP	W	OTW	OTL	L	GF	GA	Pts
1.	Chiefs Leuven	18	17	0	1	0	199	35	52
2.	White Caps Turnhout	18	14	1	0	3	174	52	44
3.	Antwerpen Phantoms	18	14	0	0	4	187	53	42
4.	Bulldogs Liège	18	12	0	1	5	134	85	37
5.	Olympia Heist op den Berg	18	10	0	0	8	126	79	30
6.	Eeklo Yeti Bears	18	8	0	0	10	120	211	24
7.	HYC Herentals II	18	6	0	0	12	61	112	18
8.	Haskey Hasselt	18	4	1	0	13	62	109	14
9.	Charleroi Red Roosters	18	3	0	0	15	66	239	9
10.	Gullegem Jets	18	0	0	0	18	42	196	0

== Playoffs ==
Quarter-finals
Chiefs Leuven	2
Haskey Hasselt	0
Bulldogs Liège	2
Olympia Heist op den Berg	0
White Caps Turnhout	2
HYC Herentals II	0
Antwerpen Phantoms	2
Eeklo Yeti Bears	0

Semi-finals
Chiefs Leuven	2
Bulldogs Liège	0
White Caps Turnhout	2
Antwerpen Phantoms	1

Final
Chiefs Leuven	2
White Caps Turnhout	1
