= 1994–95 Belgian Hockey League season =

The 1994–95 Belgian Hockey League season was the 75th season of the Belgian Hockey League, the top level of ice hockey in Belgium.

The title was not awarded due to disputes about playoff participation. HYC Herentals was accused of using more imported players than allowed, and would have been forced to forfeit all games in which the illegal players took part in, which would have left them with -19 points. Herentals however won an appeal, and would have been allowed to participate in the playoffs. The other three teams that qualified refused to participate, and the season was canceled.

== Regular season ==
	Club	GP	W	T	L	GF	GA	Pts
1.	Olympia Heist op den Berg	20	16	0	4	163	83	32
2.	HYC Herentals	20	14	1	5	188	92	29
3.	Griffoens Geel	20	12	0	8	130	102	24
4.	Phantoms Deurne	20	11	1	8	109	93	23
5.	Yeti Bears Eeklo	20	4	0	16	116	216	8
6.	IHC Leuven	20	2	0	18	90	210	4
