= 1995–96 Belgian Hockey League season =

The 1995–96 Belgian Hockey League season was the 76th season of the Belgian Hockey League, the top level of ice hockey in Belgium. Eight teams participated in the league, and Griffoens Geel won the championship.

== Regular season ==
=== Group A ===
	Club	GP	W	T	L	GF	GA	Pts
1.	Phantoms Deurne	6	6	0	0	58	14	12
2.	IHC Leuven	6	3	0	3	50	39	6
3.	Olympia Heist op den Berg	6	1	1	4	28	47	3
4.	Cercle des Patineurs Liégeois	6	1	1	4	15	51	3

=== Group B ===
	Club	GP	W	T	L	GF	GA	Pts
1.	HYC Herentals	6	6	0	0	59	16	12
2.	Griffoens Geel	6	3	1	2	40	28	7
3.	Phantoms Deurne II	6	2	1	3	36	44	5
4.	White Caps Turnhout	6	0	0	6	11	58	0

== Playoffs ==
=== Semifinals ===
- IHC Leuven - HYC Herentals 5:11/2:13
- Griffoens Geel - Phantoms Deurne 5:6/3:1

=== 3rd place ===
- IHC Leuven - Phantoms Deurne 5:12/5:14

=== Final ===
- HYC Herentals - Griffoens Geel 3:7/4:4
