= 2006–07 Belgian Hockey League season =

The 2006–07 Belgian Hockey League season was the 87th season of the Belgian Hockey League, the top level of ice hockey in Belgium. Seven teams participated in the league, and the White Caps Turnhout won the championship.

== Regular season ==
	Club	GP	W	OTW	OTL	L	GF	GA	Pts
1.	HYC Herentals	12	9	1	0	2	100	38	29
2.	White Caps Turnhout	12	8	2	0	2	98	39	28
3.	Olympia Heist op den Berg	12	8	0	0	4	82	51	24
4.	Chiefs Leuven	12	7	0	2	3	58	40	23
5.	Phantoms Deurne	12	5	0	1	6	82	59	16
6.	Bulldogs de Liège	12	2	0	0	10	34	87	6
7.	Haskey Hasselt	12	0	0	0	12	22	162	0

== Playoffs ==
Semi-finals
HYC Herentals	1
Chiefs Leuven	3
Olympia Heist op den Berg	0
White Caps Turnhout	3

Final
Chiefs Leuven	0
White Caps Turnhout	4
Third place
not played

== Gerard Sak Cup (5th place) ==
=== Semifinal ===
- Bulldogs de Liege - Haskey Hasselt 2-0 (5-2, 4–6)

=== Final ===
- Phantoms Deurne - Bulldogs de Liege 2-1 (2-5, 3–2, 1–0)
