= 2000–01 Belgian Hockey League season =

The 2000–01 Belgian Hockey League season was the 81st season of the Belgian Hockey League, the top level of ice hockey in Belgium. Six teams participated in the league, and Phantoms Deurne won the championship.

== Regular season ==
	Club	GP	W	OTW	OTL	L	GF	GA	Pts
1.	Olympia Heist op den Berg	10	5	3	0	2	89	43	21
2.	Phantoms Deurne	10	6	0	3	1	78	35	21
3.	HYC Herentals	10	5	0	1	4	40	40	16
4.	Griffoens Geel	10	4	1	0	5	41	42	14
5.	Chiefs Leuven	10	3	0	0	7	42	67	9
6.	Yeti Bears Eeklo	10	3	0	0	7	42	67	9

== Final round ==
	Club	GP	W	OTW	OTL	L	GF	GA	Pts
1.	Phantoms Deurne	6	5	0	0	1	45	31	15
2.	HYC Herentals	6	3	0	0	3	32	37	9
3.	Olympia Heist op den Berg	6	1	0	0	5	29	38	3

=== Final ===
- HYC Herentals - Phantoms Deurne 0:2 (4:10, 3:9)

== 4th-6th place ==
	Club	GP	W	OTW	OTL	L	GF	GA	Pts
4.	Chiefs Leuven	4	4	0	0	0	35	14	12
5.	Griffoens Geel	4	2	0	0	2	35	32	6
6.	Yeti Bears Eeklo	4	0	0	0	4	17	41	0
