= 2007–08 Belgian Hockey League season =

The 2007–08 Belgian Hockey League season was the 88th season of the Belgian Hockey League, the top level of ice hockey in Belgium. Six teams participated in the league, and the White Caps Turnhout won the championship.

== Regular season ==
	Club	GP	W	OTW	OTL	L	GF	GA	Pts
1.	HYC Herentals	20	16	0	1	3	138	68	49
2.	Olympia Heist op den Berg	20	13	0	1	6	100	71	40
3.	White Caps Turnhout	20	12	1	1	6	113	66	39
4.	Chiefs Leuven	19	10	1	0	8	81	69	32
5.	Phantoms Deurne	19	4	2	0	13	77	78	16
6.	Bulldogs de Liège	20	0	0	1	19	36	193	1

== Playoffs ==
Semi-finals
Chiefs Leuven	1
HYC Herentals	3
Olympia Heist op den Berg	1
White Caps Turnhout	3

Final
HYC Herentals	2
White Caps Turnhout	4
Third place
not held
