= 2002–03 Belgian Hockey League season =

Belgian ice hockey league season

The 2002–03 Belgian Hockey League season was the 83rd season of the Belgian Hockey League, the top level of ice hockey in Belgium. Five teams participated in the league, and Phantoms Deurne won the championship.

== Regular season ==
	Club	GP	W	OTW	OTL	L	GF	GA	Pts
1.	Olympia Heist op den Berg	16	12	0	1	3	106	58	37
2.	HYC Herentals	16	11	0	0	5	106	65	33
3.	Phantoms Deurne	16	9	1	0	6	96	85	29
4.	Chiefs Leuven	16	5	1	0	10	93	105	17
5.	White Caps Turnhout	16	1	0	1	14	63	151	4

== Playoffs ==
=== Semifinals ===
- Olympia Heist op den Berg - Chiefs Leuven 9:4/7:2
- Phantoms Deurne - HYC Herentals 8:2/4:5 OT

=== 3rd place ===
- HYC Herentals - Chiefs Leuven 9:10

=== Final ===
- Olympia Heist op den Berg - Phantoms Deurne 2:4
