= 1993–94 Belgian Hockey League season =

The 1993–94 Belgian Hockey League season was the 74th season of the Belgian Hockey League, the top level of ice hockey in Belgium. Six teams participated in the league, and Herentals IJC won the championship.

== Regular season ==
	Club	GP	W	T	L	GF	GA	Pts
1.	Olympia Heist op den Berg	20	15	2	3	156	65	32
2.	Griffoens Geel	20	13	1	6	151	107	27
3.	Buffalos Liège	20	11	1	8	135	111	23
4.	Herentals IJC	20	9	1	10	163	128	19
5.	Phantoms Deurne	20	9	1	10	148	107	19
6.	Yeti Bears Eeklo	20	0	0	20	75	310	0

== Playoffs ==
=== Semifinals ===
- Herentals IJC - Heist-op-den-Berg 4-8, 9-5 (1-0 OT)
- Griffoens Geel - Buffalos Liege 7-6, 2-6 (2-0 SO)

=== Final ===
- Herentals IJC - Griffoens Geel 7-6, 6-8 (1-0 OT)

=== 3rd place ===
- Heist-op-den-Berg - Buffalos Liege 14-4, 9-6
