= 1998–99 Belgian Hockey League season =

The 1998–99 Belgian Hockey League season was the 79th season of the Belgian Hockey League, the top level of ice hockey in Belgium. Five teams participated in the league, and Olympia Heist op den Berg won the championship.

== First round ==
| | Club | GP | W | T | L | GF | GA | Pts |
|---|---|---|---|---|---|---|---|---|
| 1. | Olympia Heist op den Berg | 6 | 3 | 1 | 2 | 39 | 33 | 7 |
| 2. | Griffoens Geel | 6 | 3 | 1 | 2 | 45 | 36 | 7 |
| 3. | HYC Herentals | 6 | 3 | 0 | 3 | 37 | 39 | 6 |
| 4. | IHC Leuven | 6 | 2 | 0 | 4 | 33 | 46 | 4 |

=== Qualification for final round ===
- Yeti Bears Eeklo - IHC Leuven 2:15

== Final round ==
| | Club | GP | W | T | L | GF | GA | Pts |
|---|---|---|---|---|---|---|---|---|
| 1. | HYC Herentals | 6 | 4 | 1 | 1 | 41 | 31 | 9 |
| 2. | Olympia Heist op den Berg | 6 | 3 | 1 | 2 | 33 | 34 | 7 |
| 3. | IHC Leuven | 6 | 3 | 0 | 3 | 34 | 33 | 6 |
| 4. | Griffoens Geel | 6 | 1 | 0 | 5 | 31 | 41 | 2 |

== Playoffs ==
=== 3rd place ===
- Griffoens Geel - IHC Leuven 5:5/0:7

=== Final ===
- Olympia Heist op den Berg - HYC Herentals 6:3/5:4
