= 2001–02 Belgian Hockey League season =

The 2001–02 Belgian Hockey League season was the 82nd season of the Belgian Hockey League, the top level of ice hockey in Belgium. Six teams participated in the league, and HYC Herentals won the championship.

== Regular season ==
	Club	GP	W	OTW	OTL	L	GF	GA	Pts
1.	Phantoms Deurne	10	9	0	1	0	78	33	28
2.	Olympia Heist op den Berg	10	7	1	0	2	72	32	23
3.	HYC Herentals	10	5	1	1	3	38	44	18
4.	Griffoens Geel	10	4	0	0	6	46	56	12
5.	White Caps Turnhout	10	2	0	0	8	50	79	6
6.	Chiefs Leuven	10	1	0	0	9	35	67	3

== Playoffs ==
=== 5th place ===
- Chiefs Leuven - White Caps Turnhout 1:9/5:7

=== Semifinals ===
- Griffoens Geel - Phantoms Deurne 2:7/4:10
- Olympia Heist op den Berg - HYC Herentals 2:2/3:4

=== 3rd place ===
- Olympia Heist op den Berg - Griffoens Geel 8:3

=== Final ===
- Phantoms Deurne - HYC Herentals 5:1
