= 2009–10 Belgian Hockey League season =

The 2009–10 Belgian Hockey League season was the 90th season of the Belgian Hockey League, the top level of ice hockey in Belgium. Five teams participated in the league, and the Chiefs Leuven won the championship.

== Regular season ==
	Club	GP	W	OTW	OTL	L	GF	GA	Pts
1.	HYC Herentals	16	11	2	0	3	91	62	37
2.	Chiefs Leuven	16	9	1	1	5	74	60	30
3.	White Caps Turnhout	16	6	1	1	8	75	62	21
4.	Phantoms Deurne	16	6	1	1	8	78	85	21
5.	Olympia Heist op den Berg	16	3	0	2	11	48	96	11

== Playoffs ==
Semi-finals
Phantoms Deurne	0
HYC Herentals	3
Chiefs Leuven	3
White Caps Turnhout	1

Final
HYC Herentals	2
Chiefs Leuven	4
Third place
not held
