= 1996–97 Belgian Hockey League season =

Sports season

The 1996–97 Belgian Hockey League season was the 77th season of the Belgian Hockey League, the top level of ice hockey in Belgium. Six teams participated in the league, and HYC Herentals won the championship.

== Regular season ==
	Club	GP	W	T	L	GF	GA	Pts
1.	HYC Herentals	10	10	0	0	97	37	20
2.	Cercle des Patineurs Liégeois	10	5	2	3	83	63	12
3.	Griffoens Geel	10	5	1	4	72	49	11
4.	IHC Leuven	10	3	3	4	43	54	9
5.	Olympia Heist op den Berg	10	3	2	5	67	71	8
6.	Phantoms Deurne II	10	0	0	10	28	116	0

== Playoffs ==
=== Semifinals ===
- HYC Herentals - IHC Leuven 11:9/5:1
- Cercle des Patineurs Liégeois - Griffoens Geel 6:7/4:10

=== 3rd place ===
- Cercle des Patineurs Liégeois - IHC Leuven 6:6/6:19

=== Final ===
- HYC Herentals - Griffoens Geel 14:3/3:1
