= 1992–93 Belgian Hockey League season =

The 1992–93 Belgian Hockey League season was the 73rd season of the Belgian Hockey League, the top level of ice hockey in Belgium. Six teams participated in the league, and Herentals IJC won the championship.

== Regular season ==
	Club	GP	W	T	L	GF	GA	Pts
1.	Herentals IJC	20	17	1	2	197	96	35
2.	Griffoens Geel	20	13	1	6	136	100	27
3.	Phantoms Deurne	20	10	3	7	140	122	23
4.	Olympia Heist-op-den-Berg	20	9	2	9	131	94	20
5.	Buffalos Liège	20	5	1	14	119	192	11
6.	IHC Leuven	20	2	0	18	85	204	2*

- (* IHC Leuven had two points deducted.)

== Playoffs ==
	Club	GP	W	T	L	GF	GA	Pts (Bonus)
1.	Herentals IJC	6	4	1	1	45	24	13(4)
2.	Olympia Heist-op-den-Berg	6	3	2	1	44	28	9(1)
3.	Phantoms Deurne	6	2	1	3	41	43	7(2)
4.	Griffoens Geel	6	1	0	5	23	58	5(3)
