= 2008–09 Belgian Hockey League season =

The 2008–09 Belgian Hockey League season was the 89th season of the Belgian Hockey League, the top level of ice hockey in Belgium. Six teams participated in the league, and HYC Herentals won the championship.

== Regular season ==
	Club	GP	W	OTW	OTL	L	GF	GA	Pts
1.	HYC Herentals	20	13	1	2	4	126	61	43
2.	Olympia Heist op den Berg	20	12	0	0	8	100	70	36
3.	White Caps Turnhout	20	10	1	2	7	84	68	34
4.	Bulldogs de Liège	20	9	3	0	8	76	79	33
5.	Chiefs Leuven	20	9	2	1	8	78	76	32
6.	Phantoms Deurne	20	0	0	2	18	38	148	2

== Playoffs ==
Semi-finals
HYC Herentals	3
Bulldogs de Liège	1
Olympia Heist op den Berg	1
White Caps Turnhout	3

Final
HYC Herentals	4
White Caps Turnhout	3
Third place
not held
