= 2005–06 Belgian Hockey League season =

The 2005–06 Belgian Hockey League season was the 86th season of the Belgian Hockey League, the top level of ice hockey in Belgium. Five teams participated in the league, and the White Caps Turnhout won the championship.

== Regular season ==
	Club	GP	W	OTW	OTL	L	GF	GA	Pts
1.	White Caps Turnhout	16	11	2	0	3	73	36	37
2.	Phantoms Deurne	16	10	0	1	5	75	47	31
3.	Chiefs Leuven	16	7	1	2	6	47	49	25
4.	Olympia Heist op den Berg	16	3	3	3	7	61	71	18
5.	HYC Herentals	16	2	1	1	12	42	95	9

== Playoffs ==
Semi-finals
Phantoms Deurne	1
White Caps Turnhout	2
Olympia Heist op den Berg	0
Chiefs Leuven	2

Final
White Caps Turnhout	3
Chiefs Leuven	2
Third place
not held
