= 2004–05 Belgian Hockey League season =

The 2004–05 Belgian Hockey League season was the 85th season of the Belgian Hockey League, the top level of ice hockey in Belgium. Four teams participated in the league, and the Chiefs Leuven won the championship.

== Regular season ==
	Club	GP	W	OTW	OTL	L	GF	GA	Pts
1.	Olympia Heist op den Berg	6	3	1	0	2	23	15	11
2.	White Caps Turnhout	6	3	0	1	2	17	21	10
3.	Phantoms Deurne	6	3	0	0	3	22	21	9
4.	Chiefs Leuven	6	2	0	0	4	16	21	6

== Playoffs ==
Semi-finals
Phantoms Deurne	0
White Caps Turnhout	2
Olympia Heist op den Berg	0
Chiefs Leuven	2

Final
White Caps Turnhout	2
Chiefs Leuven	3
Third place
not held
