= 1990–91 Belgian Hockey League season =

The 1990–91 Belgian Hockey League season was the 71st season of the Belgian Hockey League, the top level of ice hockey in Belgium. Six teams participated in the league, and Olympia Heist op den Berg won the championship.

== Overview ==
The second semifinal game between Griffoens Geel and the Brussels Tigers was stopped due to a brawl. Griffoens Geel players Hans Horemans, Serge Lauzon, Kurt Weddingen, and Johan van Springel were suspended indefinitely pending a disciplinary hearing. Horemans, Lauzon, Van Springel and Weddingen all received further suspensions, ranging from 12 games to two years. The club's head coach, Guy Van Gelder received a six-game suspension, and 15 other players were handed six-week suspensions.

Griffoens Geel had only nine players eligible to play in the finals following the suspensions. At the 11:42 mark of the first game, with Olympia Heist op den Berg already leading 8-0, the game was stopped by referee Miuchel Beyens following a misconduct he issued to Griffoens Geel goaltender, Raf Melis.

Griffoens Geel were excluded from the playoffs following the first game. The Brussels Tigers were moved up to the final, and the third place series they were participating in against Herentals IJC was cancelled. It was decided that the games they participated in against Olympia Heist op den Berg were to be friendlies only, and Olympia Heist op den Berg was declared Belgian champions.

== Regular season ==
	Club	GP	W	T	L	GF	GA	Pts
1.	Olympia Heist op den Berg	20	15	2	3	140	75	32
2.	Griffoens Geel	20	14	1	5	160	91	29
3.	Brussels Tigers	20	13	6	1	160	123	27
4.	Herentals IJC	20	9	1	10	110	115	19
5.	Phantoms Deurne	20	2	3	15	86	165	7
6.	Liège Buffaloes	20	2	2	16	97	184	6

== Playoffs ==
=== Semifinals ===
- Olympia Heist op den Berg - Herentals IJC 7-3, 11-3, 12-2
- Griffoens Geel - Brussels Tigers 9-7, 5-10 (Stopped at 51:58), 10-7

=== Final ===
- Olympia Heist op den Berg - Griffoens Geel 8-0 (Stopped at 11:42)
- Olympia Heist op den Berg - Brussels Tigers 15-5, 5-8

=== 3rd place ===
- Herentals IJC - Brussels Tigers 6-11 (Remainder of the series was cancelled.)
