= 2003–04 Belgian Hockey League season =

Sports season

The 2003–04 Belgian Hockey League season was the 84th season of the Belgian Hockey League, the top level of ice hockey in Belgium. Four teams participated in the league, and Olympia Heist op den Berg won the championship.

== Playoffs ==
=== Semifinals ===
- Phantoms Deurne - White Caps Turnhout 1:2 (8:2, 4:5 OT, 4:5 OT)
- Olympia Heist op den Berg - Chiefs Leuven 3:1 (8:1, 4:6, 8:1, 5:4)

=== Final ===
- White Caps Turnhout - Olympia Heist op den Berg 0:2 (4:5, 0:6)
