= 1987–88 Belgian Hockey League season =

The 1987–88 Belgian Hockey League season was the 68th season of the Belgian Hockey League, the top level of ice hockey in Belgium. Six teams participated in the league, and Olympia Heist op den Berg won the championship.

== Regular season ==
	Club	GP	W	T	L	GF	GA	Pts
1.	Herentals IJC	10	9	0	1	98	38	18
2.	Phantoms Deurne	10	9	0	1	96	49	18
3.	Olympia Heist op den Berg	10	5	0	5	63	43	10
4.	Griffoens Geel	10	4	0	6	68	60	8
5.	CP Liège	10	3	0	7	86	82	6
6.	Vorst Brussels	10	0	0	10	26	165	0

== Playoffs ==
	Club	GP	W	T	L	GF	GA	Pts
1.	Olympia Heist op den Berg	6	5	0	1	35	15	10
2.	Phantoms Deurne	6	3	0	3	27	31	6
3.	Griffoens Geel	5	2	0	3	19	24	4
4.	Herentals IJC	5	1	0	4	25	36	2
