= 1991–92 Belgian Hockey League season =

The 1991–92 Belgian Hockey League season was the 72nd season of the Belgian Hockey League. It was considered to be the topmost level of ice hockey in Belgium. Out of the five teams that participated in the league, Olympia Heist op den Berg won the championship.

== Regular season ==
	Club	GP	W	T	L	GF	GA	Pts
1.	Brussels Tigers	24	17	1	6	178	118	35
2.	Olympia Heist op den Berg	24	13	4	7	139	107	30
3.	Herentals IJC	24	14	2	8	168	117	30
4.	Griffoens Geel	24	8	3	13	119	150	19
5.	Phantoms Deurne	24	2	2	20	82	194	6

== Playoffs ==
=== Semifinals ===
- Brussels Tigers - Griffoens Geel 3-3, 4-5
- Olympia Heist op den Berg - Herentals IJC 4-3, 8-1

=== Final ===
- Olympia Heist op den Berg - Griffoens Geel 6-5 (OT), 5-4 (OT)

=== 3rd place ===
- Herentals IJC - Brussels Tigers 9-8 (OT)
