= 2011–12 Belgian Hockey League season =

The 2011–12 Belgian Hockey League season was the 92nd season of the Belgian Hockey League, the top level of ice hockey in Belgium. Three teams participated in the league, and HYC Herentals won the championship.

== Regular season ==
	Club	GP	W	OTW	OTL	L	GF	GA	Pts
1.	HYC Herentals	8	8	0	0	0	61	12	24
2.	Chiefs Leuven	8	3	1	0	4	26	38	11
3.	White Caps Turnhout	8	0	0	1	7	11	48	1

== Final ==
- Chiefs Leuven - HYC Herentals 0:3 (3:5, 2:7, 1:7)
