= Low Countries Cup =

Ice hockey tournament

The Low Countries Cup was an ice hockey tournament consisting of teams from the Netherlands and Belgium. The tournament was played from 1995–1999 and from 2003–2006.

== Champions ==
Year	Winner	Runner-up	3rd place
2006	(Netherlands) Amstel Tijgers	(Netherlands) Tilburg Trappers	(Netherlands) Heerenveen Flyers
2005	(Netherlands) Amsterdam Bulldogs	(Netherlands) Heerenveen Flyers	(Netherlands) Smoke Eaters Geleen
2004	(Netherlands) Heerenveen Flyers	(Netherlands) Amsterdam Bulldogs	(Netherlands) Tilburg Trappers
1999	(Netherlands) Smoke Eaters Geleen	(Belgium) HYC Herentals	none
1998	(Netherlands) Smoke Eaters Geleen	(Netherlands) Den Bosch	(Belgium) IHC Leuven
1997	(Belgium) HYC Herentals	(Netherlands) Den Bosch	(Belgium) Griffoens Geel
1996	(Belgium) Phantoms Deurne	(Belgium) HYC Herentals	(Netherlands) HYS The Hague
