= 1989–90 Belgian Hockey League season =

The 1989–90 Belgian Hockey League season was the 70th season of the Belgian Hockey League, the top level of ice hockey in Belgium. Five teams participated in the league, and Olympia Heist op den Berg won the championship.

== Regular season ==
	Club	GP	W	T	L	GF	GA	Pts
1.	Olympia Heist op den Berg	8	6	1	1	83	29	13
2.	Brussels Tigers	8	6	0	2	78	48	12
3.	Herentals IJC	8	4	0	4	53	55	8
4.	Griffoens Geel	8	3	1	4	53	59	7
5.	Liège Buffaloes	8	0	0	8	42	117	0

== Playoffs ==
	Club	GP	W	T	L	GF	GA	Pts
1.	Olympia Heist op den Berg	6	5	0	1	47	19	10
2.	Brussels Tigers	6	4	0	2	45	41	8
3.	Herentals IJC	6	2	0	4	28	41	4
4.	Griffoens Geel	6	1	0	5	33	52	2
