= 1988–89 Belgian Hockey League season =

The 1988–89 Belgian Hockey League season was the 69th season of the Belgian Hockey League, the top level of ice hockey in Belgium. Four teams participated in the league, and Olympia Heist op den Berg won the championship.

== Regular season ==
	Club	GP	W	T	L	GF	GA	Pts
1.	(Belgium) Olympia Heist op den Berg	12	10	1	1	103	55	21
2.	(Netherlands) Leeuwarden	12	6	0	6	78	83	12
3.	(Belgium) Griffoens Geel	12	5	1	6	81	72	11
4.	(Netherlands) Eindhoven Kemphanen	12	1	0	11	51	103	2
