= 2010–11 Belgian Hockey League season =

The 2010–11 Belgian Hockey League season was the 91st season of the Belgian Hockey League, the top level of ice hockey in Belgium. Two teams, HYC Herentals and the White Caps Turnhout, participated in a seven-game series for the championship. The teams also participated in the multi-national North Sea Cup.

== Final ==
- HYC Herentals - White Caps Turnhout 2:4 (3:4 OT, 5:3, 3:1, 5:6 OT, 2:6, 2:6)
