= 1971–72 Eredivisie (ice hockey) season =

Dutch ice hockey season

The 1971–72 Eredivisie season was the 12th season of the Eredivisie, the top level of ice hockey in the Netherlands. Ten teams participated in the league, and the Tilburg Trappers won the championship. Three Belgian teams took part in the league this season.

== Regular season ==
	Club	GP	W	T	L	GF	GA	Pts
1.	Tilburg Trappers	18	17	0	1	201	61	34
2.	Eaters Geleen	18	13	2	3	139	87	28
3.	Brussels Royal IHSC	18	13	0	5	147	111	26
4.	H.H.IJ.C. Den Haag	18	12	1	5	130	74	25
5.	Nijmegen Tigers	18	9	1	8	82	91	19
6.	Heerenveen Flyers	18	8	1	9	121	110	17
7.	S.IJ. Den Bosch	18	8	0	10	75	95	16
8.	HC Utrecht	18	4	0	14	58	158	8
9.	Olympia Antwerpen	18	3	0	15	50	131	6
10.	Cercle des Patineurs Liégeois	18	0	1	17	37	122	1
