= 1961–62 Belgian Hockey League season =

Sports season

The 1961–62 Belgian Hockey League season was the 42nd season of the Belgian Hockey League, the top level of ice hockey in Belgium. Four teams participated in the league, and Brussels IHSC won the championship.

== Regular season ==
	Club	GP	W	T	L	GF	GA	Pts
1.	Brussels IHSC	6	3	2	1	39	23	8
2.	Olympia Anvers	6	4	0	2	37	27	8
3.	CP Liège	5	3	1	2	35	39	7
4.	Anvers IHC	5	0	1	5	16	39	1
