= 1909 Berlin International Tournament =

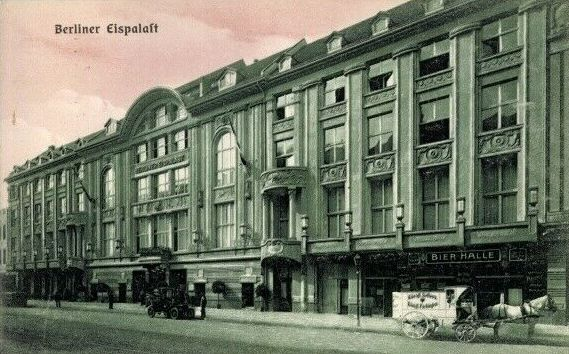
Berliner-Eispalast

The 1909 Berlin International Tournament was the second edition of the Berlin International Tournament, an international ice hockey competition. It was held in Berlin, Germany, from March 3 to March 6, 1909. Akademischer SC 1906 Dresden won the tournament.

== Tournament ==
=== First round ===
3 March 1909	(Germany) Berliner Hockey Club	11:0 (4:0, 7:0)	(Germany) SC Charlottenburg

4 March 1909	(Germany) Berliner Schlittschuhclub	7:2 (4:1, 3:1)	(Bohemia) Prague

=== Semifinals ===
6 March 1909	(Germany) Berliner Hockey Club	1:3 (1:3, 0:0)	(Belgium) Brussels Ice Hockey Club

6 March 1909	(Germany) Berliner Schlittschuhclub	1:3 (-:-, -:-)	(Germany) Akademischer SC 1906 Dresden

=== Final ===
6 March 1909	(Germany) Akademischer SC 1906 Dresden	5:3 OT (2:0, 0:2, 1:1, 2:0)	(Belgium) Brussels Ice Hockey Club
