= 1911 Brussels Ice Hockey Tournament =

The 1911 Brussels Tournament was an international ice hockey tournament held in Brussels, Belgium from December 21–23, 1911. Four teams participated in the tournament, which was won by the Oxford Canadians.

== Results ==
=== Final Table ===
Pl.		GP	W	T	L	Goals	Pts
1.	(Canada) Oxford Canadians	3	3	0	0	18:9	6
2.	(Belgium) Brussels Ice Hockey Club	3	1	1	1	12:12	3
3.	(Germany) Berliner Schlittschuhclub	3	1	0	2	11:12	2
4.	(France) Club des Patineurs de Paris	3	0	1	2	5:13	1

== See also ==
1910 Brussels Ice Hockey Tournament
