= Forest National =

Multi-purpose arena in Brussels, Belgium

Forest National / Vorst Nationaal
- Forest National (French); Vorst Nationaal (Dutch)

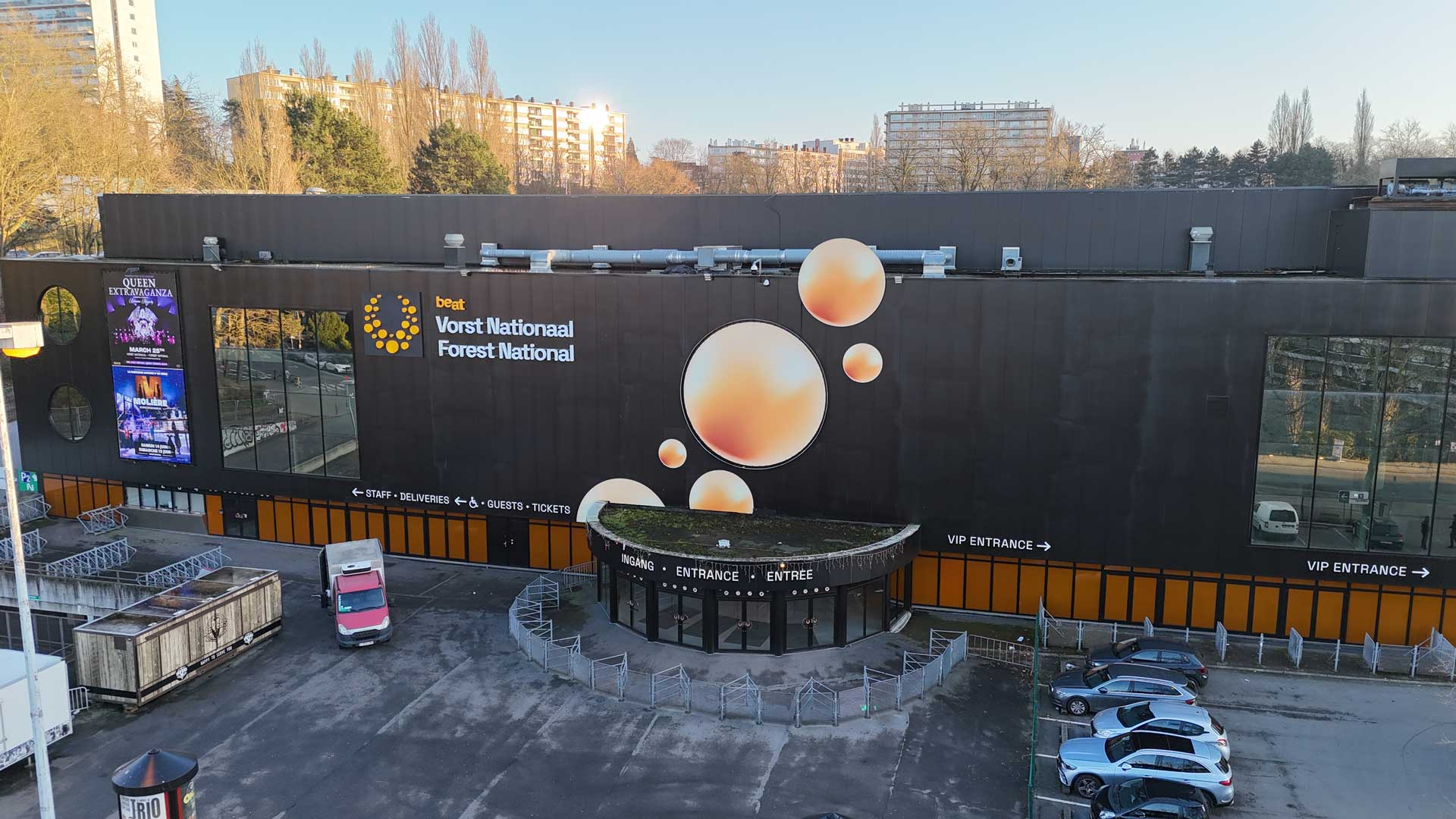
- Exterior view of venue
- Interactive map of Forest National / Vorst Nationaal
- Address: Avenue Victor Rousseau / Victor Rousseaulaan 208
- Location: 1190 Forest, Brussels-Capital Region, Belgium
- Coordinates: 50°48′35″N 4°19′34″E
- Owner: Music Hall Group
- Operator: be•at
- Capacity: 8,400 (7,868 seated)

Construction
- Opened: 8 October 1970
- Renovated: 1994–95, 2014

Tenant
- Brussels Royal IHSC (1983–2008)

Website
- www.forest-national.be/en

Forest National (French) or Vorst Nationaal (Dutch) is a multi-purpose arena located in the municipality of Forest in Brussels, Belgium. The arena holds up to 8,400 spectators (7,868 seated) and can be scaled down to about 3,000 to 4,000 spectators for smaller events. It hosts indoor sporting events as well as concerts by a wide variety of artists.

The arena, which opened in 1970, is a member of European Arenas Association (EAA). Known for its circular interior, it is owned by Music Hall Group and operated by be•at (formerly Sportpaleis Group).

== History ==
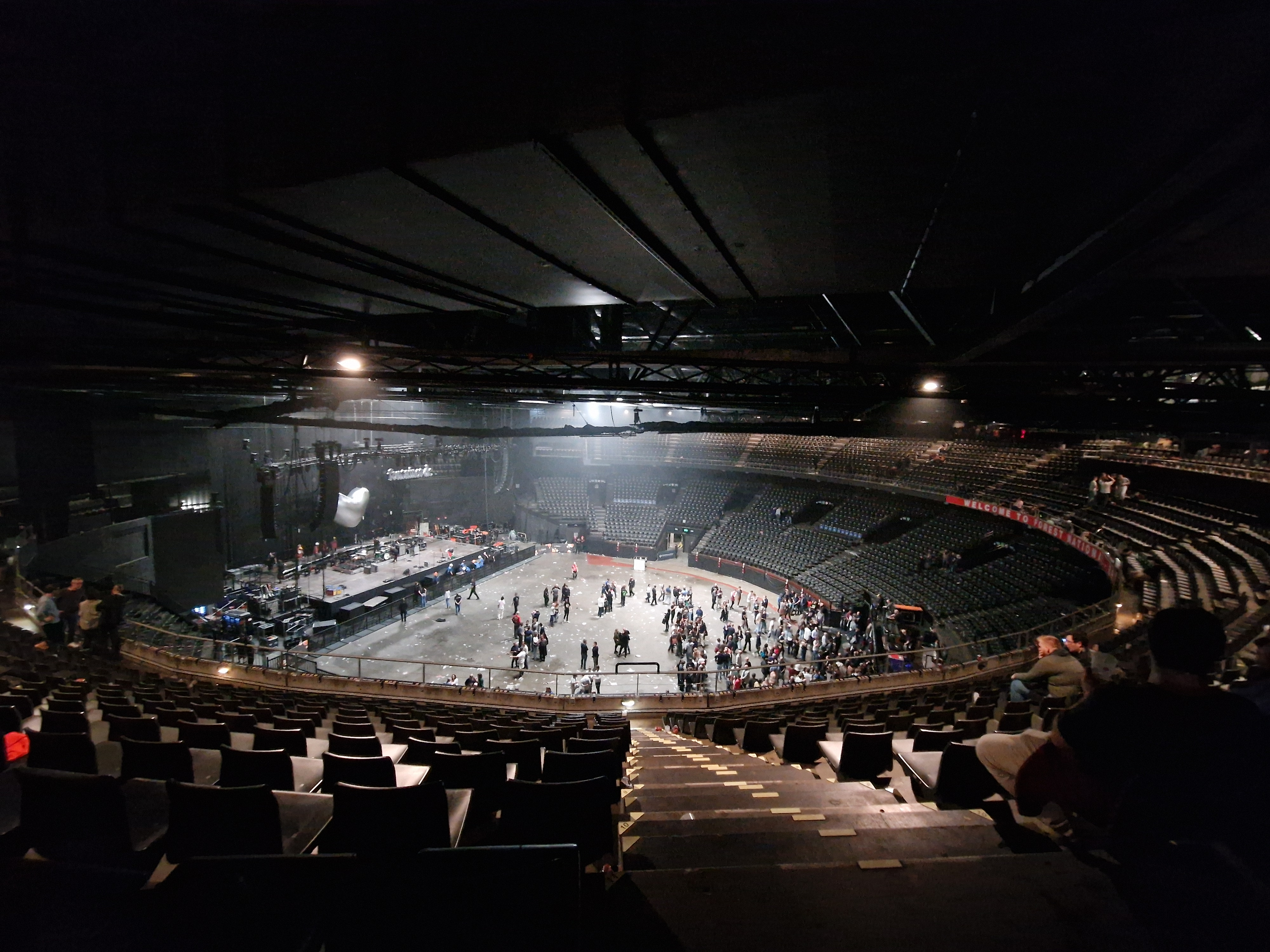
Interior of the arena

Forest National opened on 8 October 1970 with a performance by Maurice Béjart's Ballet of the 20th Century. Originally, it had a capacity of 5,500 seats. A renovation followed in 1995, which increased the capacity to 8,400 seats and improved lighting and sound systems. On that occasion, the façade was renovated, the foyer was expanded, and a new stage adjustable in height and width was also installed.

In 2005, there were plans for a new venue on the border with the Flemish municipalities of Drogenbos and Sint-Pieters-Leeuw. It was to be almost twice as large (12,000 to 15,000 seats) and should have been opened in September 2010. However, on 3 September 2008, it was announced that the owner, Music Hall Group NV, had decided not to build a new concert hall.

In 2013, Sportpaleis Group took over the operation of the hall, while Music Hall Group remained as the owners. The takeover took effect on 1 October 2013 under a framework agreement and a long lease (erfpacht) between the two companies. The following year, renovations followed, with the seats numbered and new foyers provided. One of these foyers is located in an old backstage room where a 'Wall Of Fame' was created because artists wrote personal messages on the wall. This can be visited by the public. The renovation works were carried out in 2014 by Mathieu Gijbels and ABV + Architecten. Sportpaleis Group was acquired by Live Nation in April 2019 and renamed be•at in 2022.

== Events ==
Forest National has hosted sports competitions such as the Donnay Indoor Championships tennis tournament from 1981 to 1992 and the Belgian Basketball Cup since the 2014–15 season. It was the home arena for Brussels Royal IHSC ice hockey team until 2008. Between 18 and 20 September 2015, in front of a total of 17,000 spectators, a new record attendance record for the Davis Cup tennis event in Belgium was set in the semi-final between Belgium and Argentina (3:2). On 17 March 2025, World Wrestling Entertainment (WWE) recorded an episode of WWE Raw live for Netflix from the arena.

== Noted performers ==
International artists that performed in Forest National include:

- A-ha
- ABBA
- AC/DC
- Angèle
- Aurora
- Avril Lavigne
- Axelle Red
- Babymetal
- Backstreet Boys
- Big Time Rush
- Björk
- Bob Dylan
- Bob Marley and the Wailers
- Bon Jovi
- Bryan Adams
- Conan Gray
- David Bowie
- Depeche Mode
- Deus
- Diana Ross
- Dire Straits
- Ed Sheeran
- Elisa
- Elton John
- Eric Clapton
- Europe
- Fall Out Boy
- Flume
- Frank Zappa
- Garou
- George Ezra
- (G)I-DLE
- Gloria Estefan
- Gorillaz
- Gracie Abrams
- Green Day
- Hooverphonic
- Hozier
- Indochine
- Iron Maiden
- Janet Jackson
- Jethro Tull
- Johnny Clegg
- Johnny Hallyday
- Kylie Minogue
- Lara Fabian
- Led Zeppelin
- Loïc Nottet
- Lorde
- Lost Frequencies
- Mariah Carey
- Marilyn Manson
- Metallica
- Michel Polnareff
- Michel Sardou
- Mika
- Mike Oldfield
- Mylène Farmer
- Neil Young
- New Order
- Niall Horan
- Oasis
- Olivia Dean
- Olivia Rodrigo
- Olivia Ruiz
- Ozark Henry
- Pascal Obispo
- Phil Collins
- Pink Floyd
- Queen
- Renaud
- Rosalía
- Roxette
- Simple Minds
- Sinead O'Conner
- Slayer
- System of a Down
- Tame Impala
- Taylor Swift
- Tenacious D
- The Prodigy
- The 1975
- The Rolling Stones
- Tina Turner
- Twenty One Pilots
- Tokio Hotel
- U2
- Véronique Sanson
- Whitney Houston
- Xavier Rudd

== See also ==
- List of indoor arenas in Belgium
- Culture of Belgium
