= 1910 Brussels Ice Hockey Tournament =

The 1910 Brussels Tournament was an international ice hockey tournament held in Brussels, Belgium from December 29–31, 1910. Four teams participated in the tournament, which was won by the Oxford Canadians.

== Results ==
=== Final Table ===
Pl.		GP	W	T	L	Goals	Pts
1.	(Canada) Oxford Canadians	3	3	0	0	43:5	6
2.	(Germany) Berliner Schlittschuhclub	3	2	0	1	21:18	4
3.	(Belgium) Brussels Ice Hockey Club	3	1	0	2	12:21	2
4.	(Germany) SC Charlottenburg	3	0	0	3	8:40	0

== See also ==
1911 Brussels Ice Hockey Tournament
