= 1910 Berlin International Tournament =

The 1910 Berlin International Tournament was the third and last edition of the Berlin International Tournament, an international ice hockey tournament. It was held from February 10-12, 1910, in Berlin, Germany. The tournament was won by Club des Patineurs de Paris from France.

== Tournament ==
=== First round ===
10 February 1910	(Germany) Verband Berliner Athletikvereine	1:10 (1:6, 0:4)	(France) Club des Patineurs de Paris

=== Semifinals ===
11 February 1910	(Germany) Akademischer SC 1906 Dresden	4:5 OT (3:2, 1:2, 0:1)	(France) Club des Patineurs de Paris

11 February 1910	(Germany) Berliner Schlittschuhclub	5:3 OT (2:1, 1:2, 0:0, 0:0, 2:0)	(Belgium) Brussels Ice Hockey Club

=== Final ===
12 February 1910	(Germany) Berliner Schlittschuhclub	1:4 (0:3, 1:1)	(France) Club des Patineurs de Paris
