= Belgian Cup (ice hockey) =

The Belgian Cup is the national ice hockey cup in Belgium. It has been competed for since 1986. It is currently competed for by the teams of the Belgian National League hockey league and by the lone Belgian team of the Dutch Eredivisie, HYC Herentals.

The Belgian Cup is a separate tournament from the Belgian National Championship, which is awarded to the Belgian National League playoff winner.

== Winners ==
- 1986: HYC Herentals
- 1987: not played
- 1988: Phantoms Deurne
- 1989: HYC Herentals
- 1990: Griffoens Geel
- 1991: HYC Herentals
- 1992: Brussels Tigers
- 1993: Phantoms Deurne
- 1994: Olympia Heist op den Berg
- 1995: HYC Herentals
- 1996: Phantoms Deurne
- 1997: Phantoms Deurne
- 1998: Phantoms Deurne
- 1999: HYC Herentals
- 2000: HYC Herentals
- 2001: Phantoms Deurne
- 2002: Phantoms Deurne
- 2003: HYC Herentals
- 2004: White Caps Turnhout
- 2005: Phantoms Deurne
- 2006: IHC Leuven
- 2007: White Caps Turnhout
- 2008: White Caps Turnhout
- 2009: White Caps Turnhout
- 2010: Olympia Heist op den Berg
- 2011: White Caps Turnhout
- 2012: HYC Herentals
- 2013: HYC Herentals
- 2014: Bulldogs Liège
- 2015: Phantoms Deurne
- 2016: HYC Herentals
- 2017: HYC Herentals
- 2018: Bulldogs Liège
- 2019: HYC Herentals
- 2020: HYC Herentals

---

- 2022: Bulldogs Liège
- 2023: Bulldogs Liège

== Ranking cup winners ==
Cups	Club	Year
13	HYC Herentals	1986, 1989, 1991, 1995, 1999, 2000, 2003, 2012, 2013, 2016, 2017, 2019, 2020
9	Antwerp Phantoms	1988, 1993, 1996, 1997, 1998, 2001, 2002, 2005, 2015
5	White Caps Turnhout	2004, 2007, 2008, 2009, 2011
4	Bulldogs Liège	2014, 2018, 2022, 2023
2	Olympia Heist op den Berg	1994, 2010
1	Griffoens Geel	1990
1	Brussels Tigers	1992
1	IHC Leuven	2006
