= Cercle des Patineurs Liégeois =

- City: Liège, Belgium
- League: Belgian Hockey League
- Founded: 1939

Cercle des Patineurs Liégeois is an ice hockey, speed skating and figure skating club in Liège, Belgium.

== Ice hockey history ==
From 1939, Cercle des Patineurs Liégeois (CPL) maintained an ice hockey team in the Belgian Hockey League. The club won the Belgian Hockey League 10 times, third only to Brussels Royal IHSC (with 23 titles) and Olympia Heist op den Berg (with 11 titles).

CPL won their first league title in 1949. They next were league champions in 1955, winning eight more times during the 1960s and 1970s. Their last title came in 1974.

CPL stopped operating an ice hockey team at the top level of Belgian hockey. Since 1997, the Bulldogs Liège are the current Belgian Hockey League team in Liège.

== Ice hockey achievements ==
- Belgian champion (10): 1949, 1955, 1960, 1961, 1963, 1964, 1965, 1972, 1973 and 1974.
