= 1908 Berlin International Tournament =

The 1908 Berlin International Tournament was the first edition of the Berlin International Tournament, an international ice hockey tournament. It was held from 2 to 5 November 1908 in Berlin, Germany. Princes Ice Hockey Club of Great Britain won the tournament.

== Tournament ==
=== First round ===
2 November 1908	(Germany) Berliner Schlittschuhclub	13:0 (7:0, 6:0)	(Germany) SC Charlottenburg

=== Semifinals ===
3 November 1908	(Germany) Berliner Hockey Club	1:3 (0:2, 1:1)	(United Kingdom) Princes Ice Hockey Club

4 November 1908	(Germany) Berliner Schlittschuhclub	2:9 (2:4, 0:5)	(France) Club des Patineurs de Paris

=== Final ===
5 November 1908	(United Kingdom) Princes Ice Hockey Club	3:2 (2:0, 1:2)	(France) Club des Patineurs de Paris
