= Berlin International Tournament =

The Berlin International Tournament was an international ice hockey tournament held yearly in the German capital of Berlin from 1908 to 1910. It was the first multi-national ice hockey tournament ever organized. Princes Ice Hockey Club of Great Britain won the inaugural tournament. The German club, Akademischer SC 1906 Dresden, won the second tournament. Club des Patineurs de Paris of France won the last tournament in 1910.

== Results ==
Year	Winner
1908	(United Kingdom) Princes Ice Hockey Club
1909	(Germany) Akademischer SC 1906 Dresden
1910	(France) Club des Patineurs de Paris
