= Charleroi Red Roosters =

- City: Charleroi, Belgium
- League: Belgian Hockey League
- Website: redroosters.be

The Charleroi Red Roosters were an ice hockey team in Charleroi, Belgium. They played in the Belgian Hockey League, the top level of ice hockey in Belgium.

== Belgian Hockey League results ==
Season	GP	W	OTW	OTL	L	GF	GA	Pts	Finish	Playoffs
2012-13	18	3	0	0	15	66	239	9	10th place	Did not qualify
