= Gullegem Jets =

- City: Gullegem, Belgium
- League: Belgian Hockey League
- Home arena: Finlandia

The Gullegem Jets were an ice hockey team in Gullegem, Belgium. They played in the Belgian Hockey League, the top level of ice hockey in Belgium.

== Belgian Hockey League results ==
| Season | GP | W | OTW | OTL | L | GF | GA | Pts | Finish | Playoffs |
| 2012-13 | 18 | 0 | 0 | 0 | 18 | 42 | 196 | 0 | 10th place | Did not qualify |
