= Haskey Hasselt =

- City: Hasselt, Belgium
- League: Belgian Hockey League
- Founded: 1972
- Colours: Navy, white, red

Franchise history
- Haskey Hasselt

Haskey Hasselt was an ice hockey team in Hasselt, Belgium. They played in the Belgian Hockey League, the top level of ice hockey in Belgium.

== Belgian Hockey League results ==
Season	GP	W	OTW	OTL	L	GF	GA	Pts	Finish	Playoffs
2012-13	18	4	1	0	13	62	109	14	8th place	Lost in quarterfinals
