= Bulldogs Liège =

Belgian ice hockey team

- City: Liège, Belgium
- League: BeNe League
- Founded: 1997
- Home arena: fr:Mediacité de Liège
- Colours: Navy, red, white
- Head coach: Guido Lamberti-Charles
- Website: www.liegebulldogs.be

Franchise history
- 1997–present: Bulldogs Liège

Bulldogs de Liège is a Belgian professional ice hockey team playing in the BeNe League. They play their home games at Patinoire de Liège in Liège.

== Season results ==
Season	GP	W	OTW	OTL	L	GF	GA	Pts	Finish	Playoffs
2012–13	18	12	0	1	5	134	85	37	4th, Belgian Elite League	Lost semi-finals to IHC Leuven (0W-2L)
2013-14	18	13	0	0	5	113	61	39	2nd, Belgian Elite League	Won Final
2014-15	10	6	0	0	4	47	48	18	3nd, Belgian Elite League	Final Group
2015-16	22	10	1	1	10	83	88	33	3nd, BeNeliga	Quarterfinal loss
2016-17	19	11	2	0	5	116	80	40	3nd, BeNeliga	Semifinal loss
2017-18	24	17	1	1	5	155	102	54	3nd, BeNeliga	Semifinal Loss
2018-19	22	15	2	1	4	156	84	50	4th, BeNeliga	Semifinal Loss
2019-20	20	14	2	0	6	103	66	40	4th, BeNeliga	Playoffs interrupted
2021-22	28	17	2	3	6	120	63	58	2nd, BeNeliga	Final Loss
2022-23	28	22	1	1	4	127	48	69	1st, BeNeliga	Champion
2023-24	16	9	2	1	4	54	48	32	2nd, BeNeliga	Champion
