= Eeklo Yeti Bears =

Belgian ice hockey team

- City: Eeklo, Belgium
- League: Belgian Hockey League
- Founded: 1988
- Colours: Green, white, black
- Website: http://www.yetibears.be/

Franchise history
- 1988-2013: Eeklo Yeti Bears

The Eeklo Yeti Bears were an ice hockey team in Eeklo, Belgium. They played in the Belgian Hockey League, the top level of ice hockey in Belgium. The team ceased to exist in 2013 when their home rink closed and no other rink was found to take over the team. The players joined other ice hockey teams or transferred to inline hockey.

== Belgian Hockey League Results ==
| Season | GP | W | OTW | OTL | L | GF | GA | Pts | Finish | Playoffs |
| 2012-13 | 18 | 8 | 0 | 0 | 10 | 120 | 211 | 24 | 6th place | Lost in quarterfinals |
