= Brussels Royal IHSC =

- City: Brussels
- League: Belgian Hockey League
- Founded: 1909

Franchise history
- 1909=1948: Brussels IHSC
- 1948-1954: Entente Saint-Sauveur de Bruxelles
- 1954-1966: Brussels IHSC
- 1966-1970: Brussels IHSC Poseidon
- 1970-2008: Brussels Royal IHSC

Brussels Royal IHSC was an ice hockey team in Brussels, Belgium. The team played in the Belgian Hockey League.

== History ==
The club was founded in 1909 as Brussels IHSC. They won the 1912 and 1913 Belgian championships.

They became Entente Saint-Sauveur de Bruxelles in 1948, and won the league title in 1951, before being renamed Brussels IHSC (their old name) in 1954, and won the title with that name in 1962.

The club was renamed Brussels IHSC Poseidon in 1966. In 1970, the team took on their final name, Brussels Royal IHSC, and won eight more league titles under this name.

== Achievements ==
- Belgian champion (23): 1912, 1913, 1923, 1938, 1940, 1941, 1942, 1943, 1944, 1945, 1947, 1948, 1951, 1962, 1968, 1970, 1971, 1975, 1976, 1977, 1978, 1980, 1982.

== Notable players ==
- Luc Tardif
