= Griffoens Geel =

- City: Geel, Belgium
- Founded: 1981
- Home arena: Den Bruul
- Colours: Black, orange, red

The Griffoens Geel were an ice hockey team in Geel, Belgium. They played in the Belgian Hockey League, the top level of ice hockey in Belgium.

== History ==
The club was founded in 1981. They participated in the Belgian Hockey League, winning the league title in 1996 and finishing as runners-up in 1997, until after the 2001-02 season. They also won the Belgian Cup in 1990.

== Achievements ==
- Belgian Hockey League champion (1): 1996.
- Belgian Hockey League runner-up (1): 1997.
- Belgian Cup champion (1): 1990.
