= White Caps Turnhout =

- City: Turnhout, Belgium
- League: Belgian Hockey League
- Founded: 1981
- Home arena: Kempisch ijsstadion
- Colours: Blue, white
- Website: www.white-caps.be

Franchise history
- White Caps Turnhout

The White Caps Turnhout were an ice hockey team in Turnhout, Belgium. The White Caps played in the Belgian Hockey League and North Sea Cup. They played their home games in Kempisch Ijsstadion.

== History ==
The club was founded in 1981, and won their first Belgian Hockey League title in 2004. They then won their first Belgian Cup in 2006, and repeated their success by winning it in 2007, 2008, and 2009. They also won the Belgian Championship in 2007, 2008, and 2011. They participated in ten games during the 2011-2012 North Sea Cup season before dropping out due to a lack of available players, and their game results were annulled. The team returned to the all-Belgian Elite League for 2012-2013.

== Season results ==
Note: GP = Games played, W = Wins, OTW = Overtime Wins, OTL = Overtime Losses, L = Losses, GF = Goals for, GA = Goals against, Pts = Points

Season	GP	W	OTW	OTL	L	GF	GA	Pts	Finish	Playoffs
2012-2013	18	14	1	0	3	174	52	44	2nd, Belgian Elite League	Lost Belgian Championship to Leuven Chiefs (1W-2L)
2011–12	-	-	-	-	-	-	-	-	Withdrew from North Sea Cup	Lost Belgian Championship to HYC Herentals
2010–11	28	5	0	1	22	76	146	14	7th, North Sea Cup	Won Belgian Championship vs. HYC Herentals (4-2)

== Achievements ==
- Belgian champion (4): 2006, 2007, 2008, 2011
- Belgian Cup champion (4): 2004, 2007, 2008, 2009

== IIHF Continental Cup ==
2012 Round 1 Continental Cup. Hosted in Ankara, Turkey.

Team	Country	W	L	GF	GA
White Caps Turnhout	Belgium	0	0	0	0
Başkent Yıldızları	Turkey	0	0	0	0
Tartu Kalev-Välk	Estonia	0	0	0	0
HC Metulla*	Israel	0	0	0	0

- HC Metulla withdrew from tournament in July, 2011

== Notable players ==
- Ryan Warsofsky
