= IHC Leuven =

IHC Leuven Chiefs
- City: Leuven
- League: BeNe League
- Founded: 1993
- Home arena: IJsbaan Leuven
- Colours: Black, white, red
- Head coach: Gilbert Paelinck
- Website: IHC Leuven

Franchise history
- 1993–present: IHC Leuven

IHC Leuven (French: IHC Louvain) is a professional ice hockey team in Leuven, Belgium. Leuven plays in the BeNe League (Belgian Elite League), where it competes as the Leuven Chiefs. The team are the current Belgian national ice hockey champions, having won the league playoffs in 2013. It also competes annually for the Belgian Cup.

The club also organizes affiliated recreational junior and senior hockey teams.

== History ==
IHC Leuven was founded in 1993, and won their first Belgian Championship in 2005. In 1998 and 1999, they participated in the IIHF Continental Cup. In 1998, they were paired with Frisk Tigers, Esbjerg IK, and Lyon Hockey Club, they lost to Frisk 26–1, and their best results was a 15–1 loss to Lyon. They fared marginally better in 1999, in a group with Sokil Kyiv, Ducs d'Angers, and CHH Txuri Urdin. They were hammered by Angers 26–0, but only lost 4–3 to Txuri Urdin.

In 1999–2000, they won their first and only Belgian Cup. In 2005 and 2010, Leuven won their first and second Belgian Championship. In 2011, it joined the higher level North Sea Cup, a mixed Dutch-Belgian league, although it struggled against the bigger-budget Dutch teams and lost the Belgian championship to HYC Herentals. For 2012–2013, it withdrew from the Dutch league and returned to the Belgian Elite League, winning the Belgian national championship against White Caps Turnhout.

== Roster ==
Updated February 25, 2019.

Goaltenders
Number		Player	Catches	Acquired	Place of Birth
28	(Belgium)	Karl Luypaert	L	2004	Vilvoorde, Belgium
30	(Belgium)	Keanu Evers	L	2011	Leuven, Belgium
33	(United States)	Ryan Malinowski	L	2018	East Amherst, New York, United States

Defencemen
Number		Player	Shoots	Acquired	Place of Birth
3	(Belgium)	Ben Boute	L	2015	Ghent, Belgium
8	(Belgium)	Quinten Franckx	R	2014	Leuven, Belgium
9	(Canada)	Adam Logozzo	L	2018	Woodbridge, Ontario, Canada
18	(Belgium)	Pieter-Jan Wouters	R	2010	Leuven, Belgium
23	(Belgium)	Seppe Vanwelssenaers	L	2014	Leuven, Belgium

Forwards
Number		Player	Shoots	Position	Acquired	Place of Birth
4	(Belgium)	Reyn Vanwelssenaers	R	L	2018	Leuven, Belgium
5	(Belgium)	Rino Dhondt	L	F	2016	Leuven, Belgium
5	(Belgium)	Basim Laeremans	L	F	2017	Leuven, Belgium
7	(United States)	Alec James	L	C	2016	Simi Valley, California, United States
10	(Belgium)	Dean Thurura	L	F	2010	Leuven, Belgium
11	(Belgium)	Jeffie Versin	R	F	2016	Belgium
14	(Belgium)	Dries Blockx	L	F	2015	Leuven, Belgium
15	(Belgium)	Lukas Tambeur	L	F	2017	Leuven, Belgium
15	(Belgium)	Iniaz Steyaert	L	F	2018	Humbeek, Belgium
36	(Germany)	Gregor James	R	C	2014	Viersen, Germany
77	(Belgium)	Mickey Evers	R	C	2011	Leuven, Belgium
88	(Belgium)	Michael van Egdom	L	F	2018	Belgium
89	(Russia)	Boris Kolyasnikov	L	LW	2006	Nizhny Tagil, Russia

== Achievements ==
- Belgian champion (3): 2005, 2010, 2013
- Belgian Cup champion (1): 2006

== Season Results ==
Note: GP = Games played, W = Wins, OTW = Overtime Wins, OTL = Overtime Losses, L = Losses, GF = Goals for, GA = Goals against, Pts = Points

Season	GP	W	OTW	OTL	L	GF	GA	Pts	Finish	Playoffs
2012–13	18	17	0	1	0	199	35	52	1st, Belgian Elite League	Won Belgian championship (2W-1L vs. Turnhout)
2011–12	14	1	1	1	11	26	85	6	7th, North Sea Cup	Lost Belgian championship to Herentals (0W-3L)
