= Antwerp Phantoms =

- City: Deurne, Belgium
- League: BeNe League
- Founded: 1972
- Home arena: Ijsbaan Ruggeveld (capacity: 500)
- Colours
- General manager: Siegfried Van Den Bosch
- Head coach: Gert Peeters
- Website: Antwerp Phantoms

Franchise history
- 1972 - 2013: Phantoms Deurne Antwerp
- 2013 -: Antwerp Phantoms

The Antwerp Phantoms, also known as the Phantoms Deurne, are a professional ice hockey team in Deurne, Belgium. The Phantoms play in the BeNe League.

== History ==
The club was founded in 1972, and won the Belgian Cup in 1988. From 1996 to 1998, they won three consecutive Belgian Cup titles. From 2001 to 2003, the club won three straight Belgian Hockey League titles, their only three to date. In 2005, they won their record eighth Belgian Cup. In the 2003–04 season, they participated in the IIHF Continental Cup. They were paired in a group with CH Jaca, FC Barcelona, and the Amstel Tijgers. They finished with one win, one loss, and one tie, defeating CH Jaca 8–3, tying FC Barcelona 4-4, and losing to the Amstel Tijgers 14–0.

== Roster ==
Updated February 19, 2019.

Goaltenders
Number		Player	Catches	Acquired	Place of Birth
30	(Belgium)	Mike Jansen	L	2017	Antwerp, Belgium
31	(Netherlands)	Charlie Vocke	L	2018	Capelle aan den IJssel, Netherlands
32	(Belgium)	Robin De Groote	L	2016	Antwerp, Belgium
33	(Belgium)	Cisse van der Weyde	L	2018	Belgium

Defencemen
Number		Player	Shoots	Acquired	Place of Birth
3	(Belgium)	Dean De Souter	L	2018	Belgium
5	(Belgium)	Mathias van den Bosch	L	2011	Antwerp, Belgium
9	(Belgium)	Jens Engelen	L	2018	Lier, Belgium
14	(Netherlands)	Justin van Baarsen	L	2018	Amsterdam, Netherlands
15	(Belgium)	Sean McCann-Coppens	L	2011	Belgium
16	(Belgium)	Jaron Blomme	L	2018	Belgium
2	(Belgium)	Wannes Moons	L	2018	De Meern, Belgium
29	(Belgium)	Jens Theunis	L	2010	Belgium
39	(Belgium)	Bram Eggers	L	2013	Belgium

Forwards
Number		Player	Shoots	Position	Acquired	Place of Birth
2	(United States)	Ryan Alves	R	C	2018	Dartmouth, Massachusetts, United States
4	(Netherlands)	Elia Urlings	L	F	2018	Breda, Netherlands
7	(Belgium)	Simon Dozin	L	F	2015	Anderlecht, Belgium
8	(Belgium)	Amine van de Putte	L	F	2014	Belgium
10	(Canada)	Kyle Heffernan	R	RW	2019	Kitchener, Ontario, Canada
12	(Belgium)	Ben van den Bogaert	L	F	2014	Belgium
18	(Belgium)	Bryan Verhaegen	R	F	2010	Belgium
18	(Belgium)	Scott Verhaegen	R	F	2018	Belgium
19	(Belgium)	Boris Adriaenssens	L	F	2018	Belgium
94	(Belgium)	Senne Schrickx	R	F	2017	Belgium
21	(Belgium)	Bram Klijsen	R	F	2017	Turnhout, Belgium
22	(Belgium)	Akke Klijsen	L	F	2018	Turnhout, Belgium
24	(Belgium)	Kevin de Winter	L	F	2016	Antwerp, Belgium
26	(Belgium)	Patrick Junior van Noten	R	RW	2016	Turnhout, Belgium
28	(Belgium)	Kenneth Pittoors	L	F	2011	Belgium
35	(Belgium)	Thomas de Smit	L	F	2017	Belgium
36	(Belgium)	Axel Kila	L	F	2016	Belgium
36	(Belgium)	Janick de Vylder	L	F	2018	Belgium
99	(Belgium)	Niels Oerlemans	L	F	2014	Turnhout, Belgium

== Achievements ==
- Belgian champion (3): 2000, 2001, 2003, 2015
- Belgian Cup champion (8): 1988, 1993, 1996, 1997, 1998, 2001, 2002, 2005
