= Belgian Hockey League =

Ice hockey league in Belgium

Royal Belgian Ice Hockey Federation
- Current season, competition or edition: 2020-2021
- Royal Belgian Ice Hockey Federation
- Sport: Ice Hockey
- No. of teams: 15
- Country: Belgium
- Most recent champion: Era Renomar HYC
- Website: https://www.rbihf.be/

The Belgian Hockey League, also known as the Belgian Elite League, was the highest level of competition organized by the Royal Belgian Ice Hockey Federation. The league winner was crowned the Belgian Champion. The league had been in existence since 1912. The Brussels Royal IHSC were the most decorated team with 23 titles. In 2015, the league merged with the Dutch Eredivisie to form the BeNe League.

== History ==
=== Early history ===
The Belgian Hockey League played first in 1912. The play was interrupted several times in its history. The first game suspension happened 1914-1920 due to World War I. The next break was from 1929 to 1934 due to the world economic crisis. The 3rd and last break was in the 1994/95 season, which was cancelled after the regular season due to issues over playoff participation.

=== Recent history ===
In 2009, there were 5 clubs competing in the Elite league for the Belgian Championship.

During the 2010–2011 season, the two top Belgian teams competed in a joint tournament with the teams of the Dutch Eredivisie called the North Sea Cup. The other three teams dropped out of the Belgian elite league to join the Belgian National League, leaving only Herentals and Turnhout to decide the Belgian Championship. Leuven Chiefs played in the North Sea Cup for the 2011–2012 season, but Turnhout dropped out of the league midway through the season and Leuven dropped out at the end of the season.

In 2012, the North Sea Cup was discontinued and HYC Herentals joined the Dutch Eredivisie. For the 2012–2013 season, the teams of the Belgian National League joined Leuven and Turnhout to form the Belgian Elite League, the winner of which becomes the Belgian national champion.

As of 2012–2013, the teams of the Belgian Elite League, plus HYC Herentals, compete for the Belgian Cup, which is played before and during the Elite League season.

== Former teams ==
Team	City
Antwerp Phantoms	Deurne
Leuven Chiefs	Leuven
Bulldogs Liège	Liège
Olympia Heist op den Berg	Heist-op-den-Berg
Eeklo Yeti Bears	Eeklo
Haskey Hasselt	Hasselt
HYC Herentals 2	Herentals
White Caps Turnhout	Turnhout
Charleroi Red Roosters	Charleroi
Gullegem Jets	Gullegem
HYC Herentals	Herentals
Phantoms Deurne	Deurne
IHC Louvain	Leuven
White Caps Turnhout	Turnhout
Olympia Heist op den Berg	Heist-op-den-Berg
Liège Bulldogs	
Eeklo Yeti Bears	
Charleroi Red Roosters	
Haskey Hasselt	
Atomic Moose	
Olympia I.h.c. Vzw	
Leuven Ihc	
Herentals Hyc	
Eindhoven Vikings	
Turnhout White Caps	
Gullegem Jets	
Antwerp Pahntoms	
Liederkerke Lions	

== Belgian Hockey League champions ==
- 1912: Brussels Royal IHSC
- 1913: Brussels Royal IHSC
- 1914: Cercle des Patineurs Bruxelles
- 1915-1919: Not Played
- 1920: Cercle des Patineurs Bruxelles
- 1921: Cercle des Patineurs Bruxelles
- 1922: Saint Sauveur IHC
- 1923: Brussels Royal IHSC
- 1924: Le Puck d'Anvers Antwerp
- 1925: Le Puck d'Anvers Antwerp
- 1926: Le Puck d'Anvers Antwerp
- 1927: Le Puck d'Anvers Antwerp
- 1928: Le Puck d'Anvers Antwerp
- 1929: Cercle des Patineurs Anversois
- 1930-1933: Not Played
- 1934: Cercle des Patineurs Anversois
- 1935: Cercle des Patineurs Anversois
- 1936: Cercle des Patineurs Anversois
- 1937: Cercle des Sports d'Hiver Bruxelles
- 1938: Brussels Royal IHSC
- 1939: Cercle des Sports d'Hiver Bruxelles
- 1940: Brussels Royal IHSC
- 1941: Brussels Royal IHSC
- 1942: Brussels Royal IHSC
- 1943: Brussels Royal IHSC
- 1944: Brussels Royal IHSC
- 1945: Brussels Royal IHSC
- 1946: Cercle des Patineurs Unis
- 1947: Brussels Royal IHSC
- 1948: Brussels Royal IHSC
- 1949: Cercle des Patineurs Liégeois
- 1950: Brabo IHC
- 1951: Entente Saint-Sauveur Bruxelles
- 1952: Brabo IHC
- 1953: Brabo IHC
- 1954: Brabo IHC
- 1955: Cercle des Patineurs Liégeois
- 1956: Antwerp IHC
- 1957: Antwerp IHC
- 1958: Antwerp IHC
- 1959: Antwerp IHC
- 1960: Cercle des Patineurs Liégeois
- 1961: Cercle des Patineurs Liégeois
- 1962: Brussels Royal IHSC
- 1963: Cercle des Patineurs Liégeois
- 1964: Cercle des Patineurs Liégeois

- 1965: Cercle des Patineurs Liégeois
- 1966: Olympia IHC
- 1967: Olympia IHC
- 1968: Brussels IHSC Poseidon
- 1969: Olympia IHC
- 1970: Brussels Royal IHSC
- 1971: Brussels Royal IHSC
- 1972: Cercle des Patineurs Liégeois
- 1973: Cercle des Patineurs Liégeois
- 1974: Cercle des Patineurs Liégeois
- 1975: Brussels Royal IHSC
- 1976: Brussels Royal IHSC
- 1977: Brussels Royal IHSC
- 1978: Brussels Royal IHSC
- 1979: Olympia Heist op den Berg
- 1980: Brussels Royal IHSC
- 1981: HYC Herentals
- 1982: Brussels Royal IHSC
- 1983: Olympia Heist op den Berg
- 1984: HYC Herentals
- 1985: HYC Herentals
- 1986: Olympia Heist op den Berg
- 1987: Olympia Heist op den Berg
- 1988: Olympia Heist op den Berg
- 1989: Olympia Heist op den Berg
- 1990: Olympia Heist op den Berg
- 1991: Olympia Heist op den Berg
- 1992: Olympia Heist op den Berg
- 1993: HYC Herentals
- 1994: HYC Herentals
- 1995: Not played
- 1996: Griffoens Geel
- 1997: HYC Herentals
- 1998: HYC Herentals
- 1999: Olympia Heist op den Berg
- 2000: Phantoms Deurne
- 2001: Phantoms Deurne
- 2002: HYC Herentals
- 2003: Phantoms Deurne
- 2004: Olympia Heist op den Berg
- 2005: Chiefs Leuven
- 2006: White Caps Turnhout
- 2007: White Caps Turnhout
- 2008: White Caps Turnhout
- 2009: HYC Herentals
- 2010: Chiefs Leuven

- 2011: White Caps Turnhout
- 2012: HYC Herentals
- 2013: Chiefs Leuven
- 2014: Bulldogs Liège
- 2015: Antwerp Phantoms
- 2016: HYC Herentals
- 2017: HYC Herentals
- 2018: HYC Herentals
- 2019: HYC Herentals
- 2020: HYC Herentals

== Total titles won ==
Titles	Team	Year
23	Brussels Royal IHSC; 1911–1948 Brussels IHSC; 1948–1954 Entente Saint-Sauveur; 1954–1966 Brussels IHSC; 1966–1970 Brussels IHSC Poseidon	1912, 1913, 1923, 1938, 1940, 1941, 1942, 1943, 1944, 1945, 1947, 1948, 1951, 1962, 1968, 1970, 1971, 1975, 1976, 1977, 1978, 1980, 1982
15	HYC Herentals	1981, 1984, 1985, 1993, 1994, 1997, 1998, 2002, 2009, 2012, 2016, 2017, 2018, 2019, 2020
11	Olympia Heist op den Berg	1979, 1983, 1986, 1987, 1988, 1989, 1990, 1991, 1992, 1999, 2004
10	Cercle des Patineurs Liégeois	1949, 1955, 1960, 1961, 1963, 1964, 1965, 1972, 1973, 1974
5	Le Puck d'Anvers	1924, 1925, 1926, 1927, 1928
4	Antwerp Phantoms	2000, 2001, 2003, 2015
4	Antwerp Ice Hockey Club	1956, 1957, 1958, 1959
4	Brabo IHC	1950, 1952, 1953, 1954
4	Cercle des Patineurs Anversoises	1929, 1934, 1935, 1936
4	White Caps Turnhout	2006, 2007, 2008, 2011
3	Cercle des Patineurs de Bruxelles	1914, 1920, 1921
3	Olympia IHC	1966, 1967, 1969
3	Chiefs Leuven	2005, 2010, 2013
2	Cercle des Sports d'Hiver de Bruxelles	1937, 1939
1	Saint Sauveur IHC	1922
1	Cercle des Patineurs Unis	1946
1	Griffoens Geel	1996
1	Bulldogs Liège	2014
