= Olympia Heist op den Berg =

- City: Heist-op-den-Berg, Belgium
- League: Belgian Hockey League
- Founded: 1959
- Home arena: Die Swaene
- Colours: Green, blue, white

Franchise history
- 1959–present: Olympia Heist op den Berg

Olympia Heist op den Berg is a Belgian ice hockey team in the city of Heist-op-den-Berg. They play in the newly formed BeNe-league, a joint league starting in the season 2015-2016, consisting of the top teams from the Netherlands and Belgium. The league consists of 16 teams, 10 from the Netherlands and 6 from Belgium.

== History ==
The club was founded in 1959, and have won eleven Belgian Hockey League championships, second to Brussels Royal IHSC, which has won twenty-three titles. On their twentieth anniversary in 1979, Op den Berg won their first Belgian championship. Despite winning eleven national titles, the club has only won the Belgian Cup twice, in 1994 and 2010.

== Season Results ==
Note: GP = Games played, W = Wins, OTW = Overtime Wins, OTL = Overtime Losses, L = Losses, GF = Goals for, GA = Goals against, Pts = Points

| Season | GP | W | OTW | OTL | L | GF | GA | Pts | Finish | Playoffs |
| 2012-2013 | 18 | 17 | 0 | 0 | 10 | 126 | 79 | 30 | 5th, Belgian Elite League | Lost quarter-finals to Liège Bulldogs (1W-2L) |

== Achievements ==
- Belgian Champion (11): 1979, 1983, 1986 1987, 1988, 1989, 1990, 1991, 1992, 1999, 2004
- Belgian Cup winner (2): 1994, 2010
