= Heylen Vastgoed HYC =

- City: Herentals, Belgium
- League: Central European Hockey League; 2015-present Eredivisie; 2012-2015; North Sea Cup; 2010-2012; Belgian Hockey League; 1971-2012; BelgianCup
- Founded: 1971
- Home arena: Bloso Centrum Netepark (capacity: 1600)
- Colours: Red, white
- Head coach: Sami Lipsonen
- Asst. coaches: Vincent Morgan; Nils Vroemans
- Captain: Mitch Morgan
- Website: HYC Herentals

Franchise history
- 1971–2021: HYC Herentals
- 2021–present: Heylen Vastgoed HYC

Heylen Vastgoed HYC is a professional ice hockey team based in Herentals, Belgium. They play in the Central European Hockey League.

== History ==
The club was founded in 1971. They won their first of nine Belgian Hockey League titles in 1981. In 1986, Herentals won the inaugural Belgian Cup. They have won the cup eight more times since. In 2010, it switched from the Belgian Hockey League to the North Sea Cup, a combined Belgian-Dutch elite league. When the North Sea Cup disbanded only two years later in 2012, it joined the Eredivisie.

== North Sea Cup/Eredivisie Results ==
Note: GP = Games played, W = Wins, OTW = Overtime Wins, OTL = Overtime Losses, L = Losses, GF = Goals for, GA = Goals against, Pts = Points

| Season | GP | W | OTW | OTL | L | GF | GA | Pts | Finish | Playoffs |
| 2012-13 | 36 | 12 | 0 | 4 | 20 | 155 | 190 | 40 | 5th, Eredivisie | Did not qualify |
| 2011–12 | 14 | 5 | 2 | 0 | 7 | 58 | 71 | 19 | 4th, North Sea Cup | Won Belgian Championship (3-0) |
| 2010–11 | 28 | 4 | 0 | 2 | 22 | 89 | 188 | 14 | 8th, North Sea Cup | Lost Belgian championship to White Caps Turnhout (2-4) |

== Roster ==
Updated February 26, 2019.

Goaltenders
| Number | | Player | Catches | Acquired | Place of Birth |
|---|---|---|---|---|---|
| 32 | (Belgium) | Kevin van Looveren | L | 2006 | Herentals, Belgium |
| 90 | (Belgium) | Arne Waumans | L | 2017 | Belgium |

Defencemen
| Number | | Player | Shoots | Acquired | Place of Birth |
|---|---|---|---|---|---|
| 20 | (Belgium) | Emiel Goris | L | 2011 | Herentals, Belgium |
| 13 | (Belgium) | Nils Vroemans | L | 2009 | Ekeren, Belgium |
| 23 | (Belgium) | Thijs van Laere | L | 2009 | Herentals, Belgium |
| 9 | (Slovakia) | Peter Bartek | R | 2018 | Slovakia |
| 42 | (Belgium) | Lowie Cuylaerts | L | 2016 | Herentals, Belgium |
| 46 | (Belgium) | Brent Bogaerts | R | 2016 | Herentals, Belgium |
| 65 | (Belgium) | Arne van Espen | L | 2017 | Belgium |
| 2 | (Belgium) | Chad Piccart | L | 2016 | Lille, Belgium |

Forwards
| Number | | Player | Shoots | Position | Acquired | Place of Birth |
|---|---|---|---|---|---|---|
| 67 | (Belgium) | Mitch Morgan (C) | L | LW/RW | 2015 | Herentals, Belgium |
| 7 | (Belgium) | Vincent Morgan | L | F | 2005 | Herentals, Belgium |
| 10 | (Belgium) | Ben Vercammen (A) | L | LW | 2003 | Herentals, Belgium |
| 11 | (Belgium) | Jordy van Dyck | L | F | 2008 | Herentals, Belgium |
| 17 | (Belgium) | Yente Franssen | L | F | 2010 | Lier, Belgium |
| 52 | (Belgium) | Jacques de Ceuster | L | LW | 2016 | Herentals, Belgium |
| 3 | (Belgium) | Ben Coolen | R | F | 2016 | Turnhout, Belgium |
| 12 | (Belgium) | Jul van Mele | L | F | 2012 | Belgium |
| 64 | (Canada) | Preston Shupe (A) | L | C | 2018 | Weyburn, Canada |
| 95 | (Canada) | Kyle Brothers | L | F | 2018 | Watford, Canada |
| 4 | (Belgium) | Jef van den Bosch | L | F | 2017 | Belgium |
| 76 | (Belgium) | Arne Vervoort | L | F | 2017 | Belgium |

== HYC Herentals 2 ==
As with many ice hockey clubs in the Benelux countries, HYC Herentals operates teams at several levels. The HYC Herentals second team played in the Belgian Hockey League.

== Belgian Hockey League results ==
Note: GP = Games played, W = Wins, OTW = Overtime Wins, OTL = Overtime Losses, L = Losses, GF = Goals for, GA = Goals against, Pts = Points

| Season | GP | W | OTW | OTL | L | GF | GA | Pts | Finish | Playoffs |
| 2012-13 | 18 | 6 | 0 | 0 | 12 | 61 | 112 | 18 | 7th, Belgian Elite League | Lost quarter-final to Turnhout White Caps (0W-2L) |

== Achievements ==
- Belgian champion: (15) 1981, 1984, 1985, 1993, 1994, 1997, 1998, 2002, 2009, 2012, 2016, 2017, 2018, 2019, 2020.
- Belgian Division II champion: (1) 2005.
- Belgian Cup (13): 1986, 1989, 1991, 1995, 1999, 2000, 2003, 2012, 2013, 2016, 2017, 2019, 2020.
- BeNe League (2): 2016, 2019.
